= List of justices of the Tennessee Supreme Court =

Following is a list of justices of the Tennessee Supreme Court. This list includes Judges of the Southwest Territory territorial high court, which existed from 1790 to 1796 while Tennessee remained a United States territory, Judges of the Tennessee Superior Court of Law and Equity, which existed from 1796 to 1809, and Judges of the Tennessee Court of Errors and Appeals, which existed from 1810 to 1835. These high courts were created before the 1835 Tennessee constitution, which established the Supreme Court and made the Judiciary an independent branch of government.

== Territorial high court (1790–1796) ==
Picture	Judge (birth–death)	Tenure	Appointer	Succeeded
	David Campbell (1750–1812)	October 23, 1790 – June 1, 1796 (Position abolished)	George Washington (I)	Seat established
	John McNairy (1762–1837)	December 15, 1790 – April 9, 1796 (Resigned)	George Washington (I)	Seat established
	Joseph Anderson (1757–1837)	July 15, 1791 – June 1, 1796 (Position abolished)	George Washington (I)	Seat established

== Tennessee Superior Court of Law and Equity (1796–1809) ==
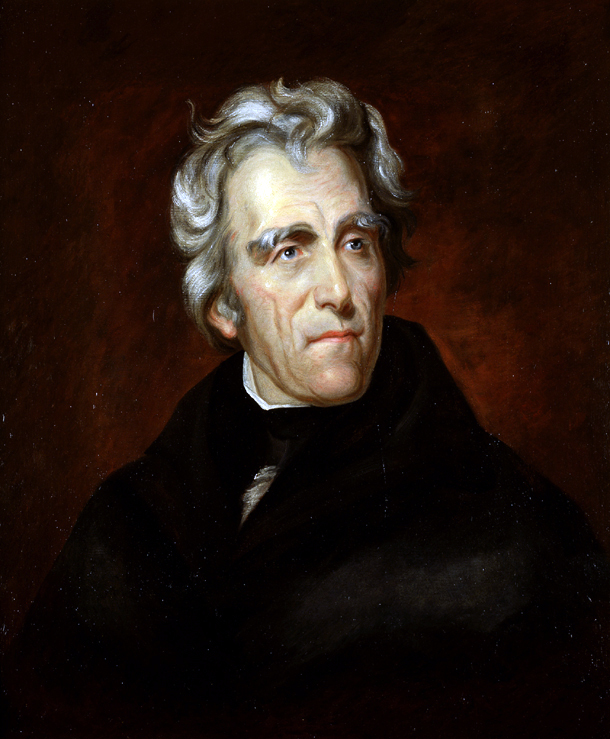
Andrew Jackson's service on the Tennessee Superior Court of Law and Equity preceded his service for his second term in the United States Senate, and as President of the United States.

Picture	Judge (birth–death)	Tenure	Appointer	Succeeded
	Willie Blount (1767 or 1768–1835)	April 1796 – 1796 (Resigned)	Tennessee General Assembly	Seat established
	John McNairy (1762–1837)	April 9, 1796 – May 1797 (Resigned)	Tennessee General Assembly	Seat established
	Archibald Roane (1759-1819)	April 1796 – 1801 (Resigned)	Tennessee General Assembly	Seat established
	William C. C. Claiborne (1775–1817)	September 28, 1796 – 1797 (Resigned)	John Sevier (D-R)	Willie Blount
	David Campbell (1750–1812)	October 11, 1797 – 1807 (Resigned)	Tennessee General Assembly	William C. C. Claiborne
	Howell Tatum (?–1822)	1797 – 1798 (Resigned)	John Sevier (D-R)	John McNairy
	Andrew Jackson (1767–1845)	December 1798 – July 1804 (Resigned)	John Sevier (D-R)	Howell Tatum
	Hugh Lawson White (1773–1840)	1801 – 1807 (Resigned)	Tennessee General Assembly	Archibald Roane
	John Overton (1766–1833)	August 1804 – December 31, 1809 (Position abolished)	Tennessee General Assembly	Andrew Jackson
	Samuel Powell (1776–1841)	1807 – December 31, 1809 (Position abolished)	Tennessee General Assembly	Seat established
	Parry Wayne Humphreys (?–1839)	1807 – December 31, 1809 (Position abolished)	Tennessee General Assembly	David Campbell

== Tennessee Court of Errors and Appeals (1810–1835) ==
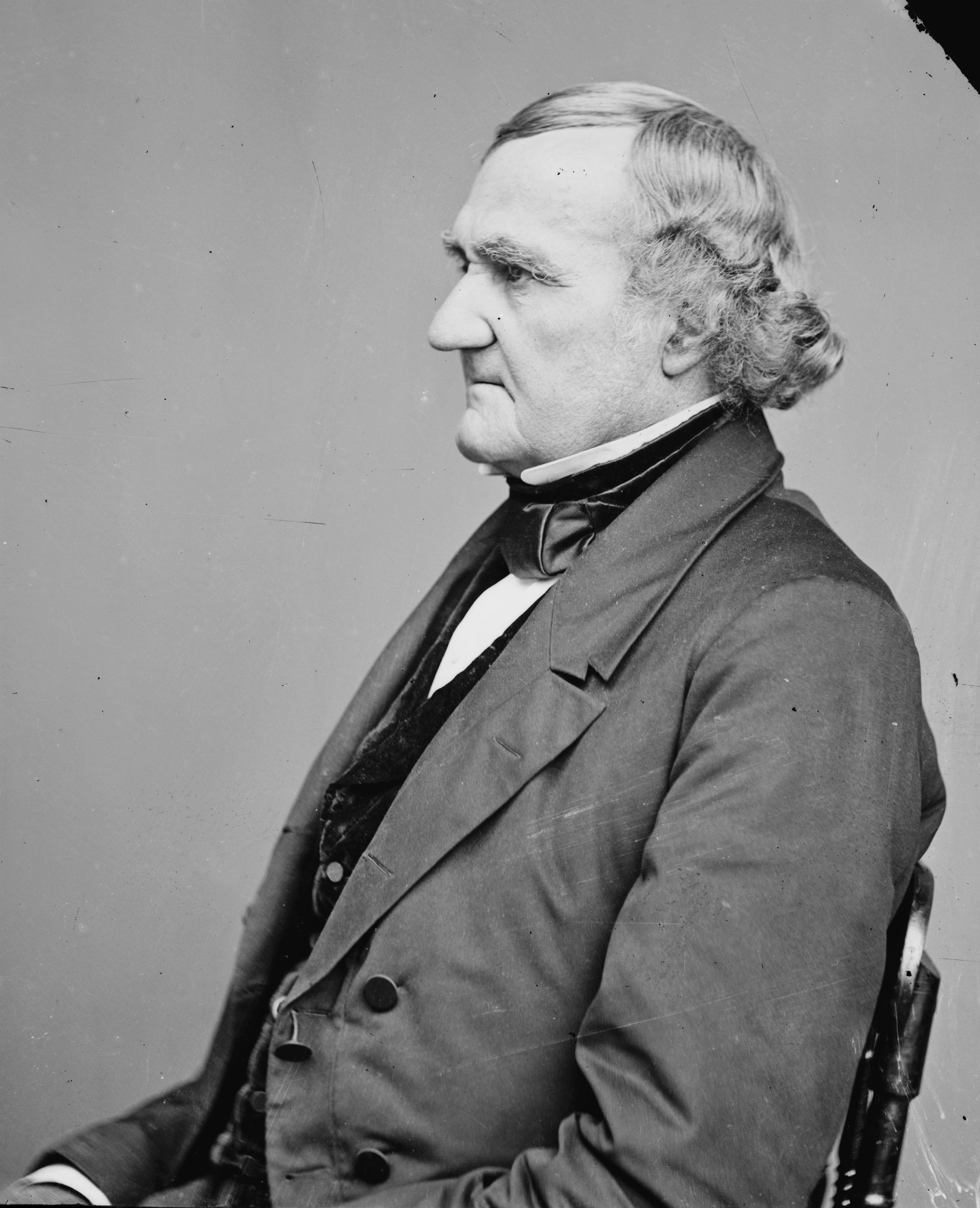
John Catron served on the Tennessee Court of Errors and Appeals before his appointment to the Supreme Court of the United States.

Picture	Judge (birth–death)	Tenure	Appointer	Succeeded
	George Washington Campbell (1769–1848)	January 1, 1810 (Note: Judge Campbell was elected by the General Assembly in 1809 and took his seat upon the creation of the Tennessee Court of Errors and Appeals on January 1, 1810.) – 1811 (Resigned)	Tennessee General Assembly	Seat established
	Hugh Lawson White (1773–1840)	January 1, 1810 (Note: Judge White was elected by the General Assembly in 1809 and took his seat upon the creation of the Tennessee Court of Errors and Appeals on January 1, 1810.) – December 1815 (Resigned)	Tennessee General Assembly	Seat established
	John Overton (1766–1833)	November 1811 – April 11, 1816 (Resigned)	Tennessee General Assembly	George Washington Campbell
	William Wilcox Cooke (?–1816)	December 1815 – July 20, 1816 (Died)	Joseph McMinn (D-R)	Hugh Lawson White
	Archibald Roane (1759-1819)	October 21, 1815 – January 4, 1819 (Died)	Tennessee General Assembly	Seat established
	John Haywood (1762–1826)	September 14, 1816 – December 22, 1826 (Died)	Joseph McMinn (D-R)	William Wilcox Cooke
	Robert Whyte (1767–1844)	October 1817 – December 1, 1835 (Position abolished)	Joseph McMinn (D-R)	John Overton
	Thomas Emmerson (1773–1837)	October 1819 – 1822 (Resigned)	Joseph McMinn (D-R)	Archibald Roane
	Jacob Peck (1779–1869)	August 1822 – December 1, 1835 (Position abolished)	Tennessee General Assembly	Thomas Emmerson
	William Little Brown (1789–1830)	1822 – October 1823 (Resigned)	Tennessee General Assembly	Seat established
	John Catron (1779–1865)	1824 – 1831 (Resigned)	Tennessee General Assembly	William Little Brown
	Thomas Lanier Williams I (1788–1856)	1826 – ?	William Carroll (D-R)	Seat established
	Henry Crabb (1793–1827)	December 1826 – 1827 (Died)	William Carroll (D-R)	John Haywood
	Nathan Green Sr. (1792–1866)	1831 – December 1, 1835 (Position abolished)	Tennessee General Assembly	John Catron
	John Catron (1779–1865); Chief Justice	December 19, 1831 – December 1, 1835 (Position abolished)	Tennessee General Assembly	Seat established

== Tennessee Supreme Court (1835–Present) ==
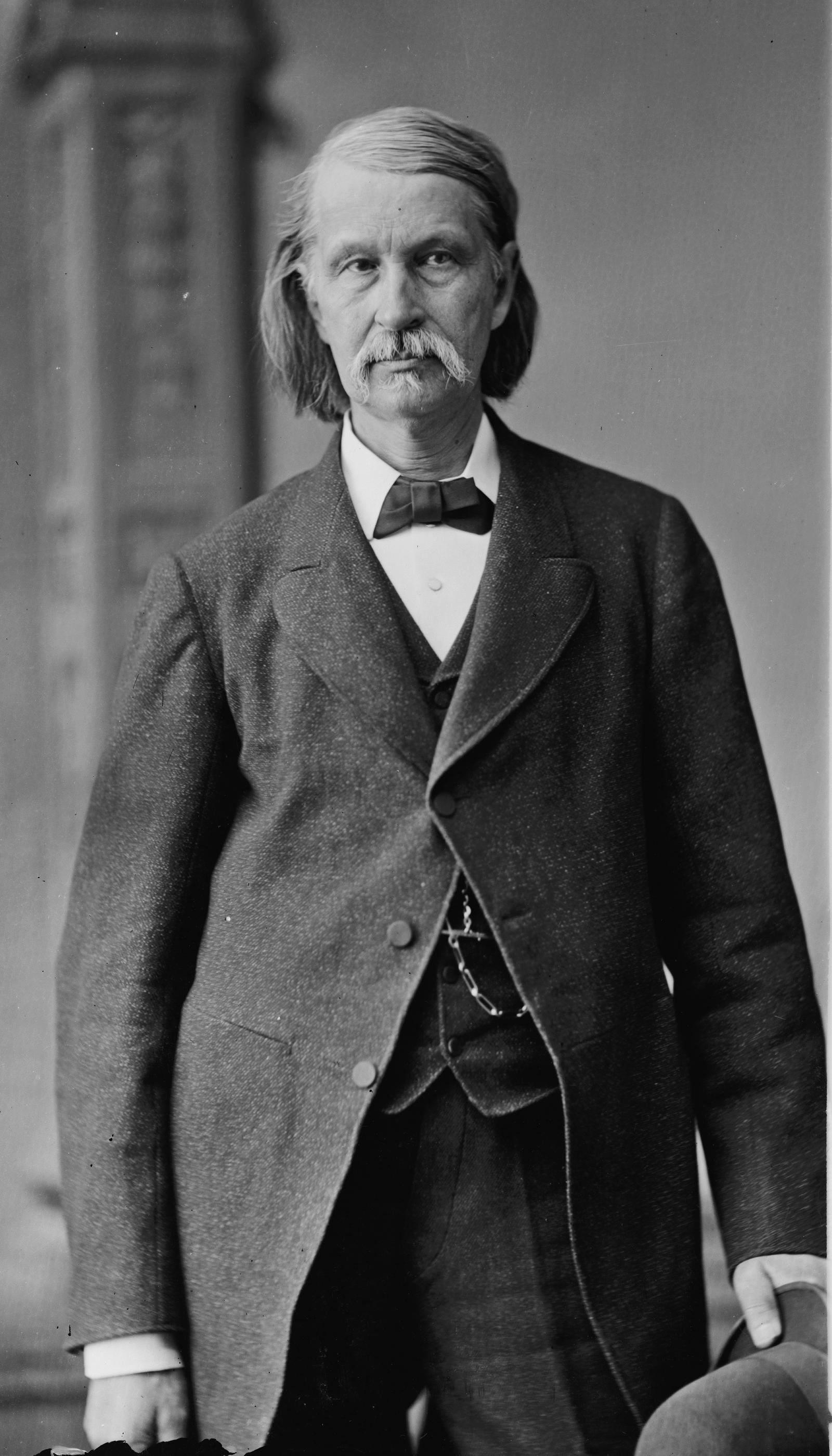
Horace Maynard served on the Tennessee Supreme Court and the United States Congress at the same time, a dual role that was challenged in court.

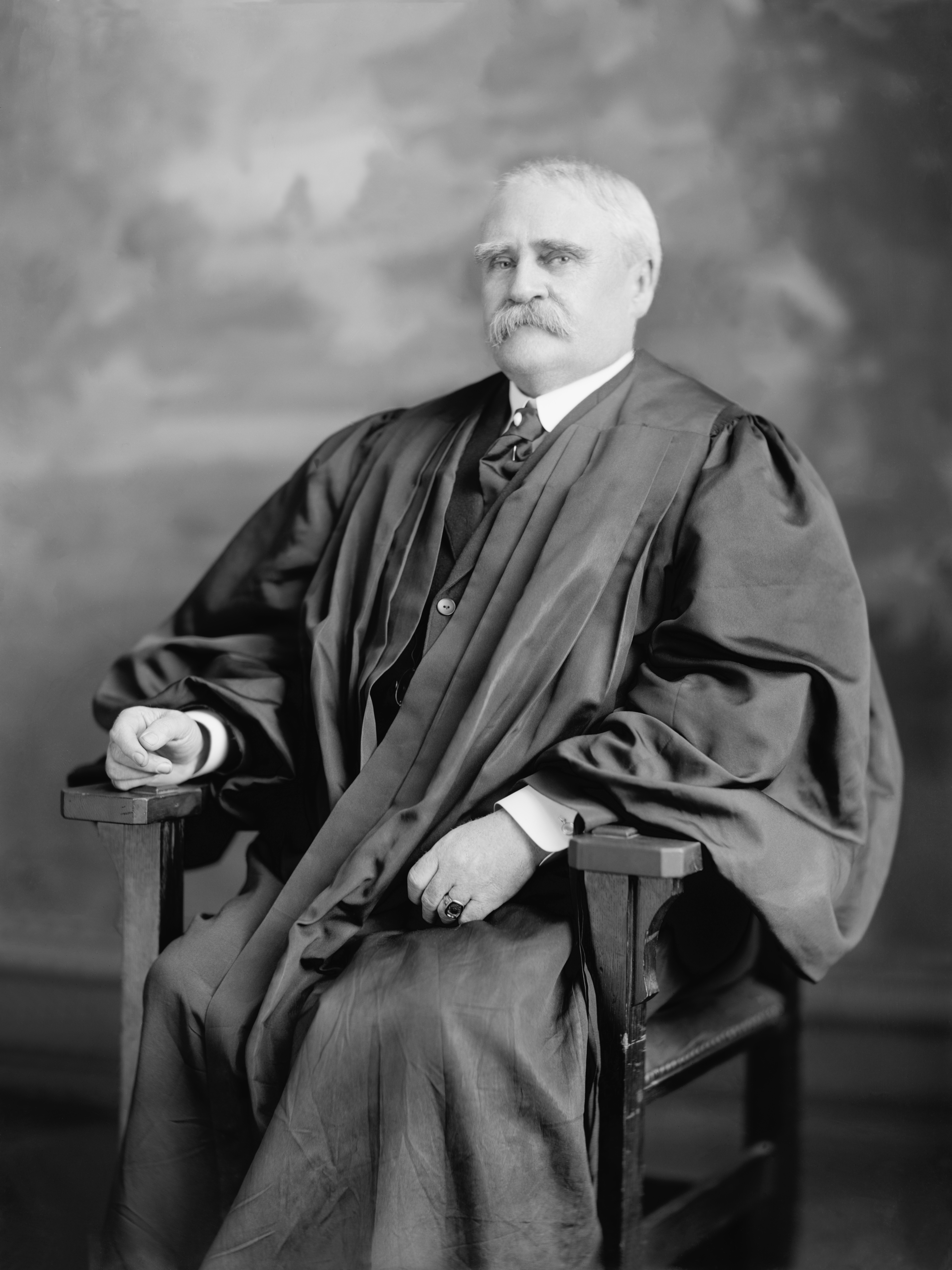
Horace Harmon Lurton also went from the Tennessee Supreme Court to the Supreme Court of the United States.

Picture	Judge (birth–death)	Tenure	Grand Division	Appointer/Method of Appointment (Note: Since 1835, the method by which Justices have been chosen have varied between direct election, election by the Tennessee General Assembly, direct selection by the Governor of Tennessee, and a hybrid system of executive appointment, legislative confirmation, and direct retention elections known as the Tennessee Plan.)	Succeeded
	William B. Turley (1800–1851)	December 4, 1835 – April 1850 (Resigned)	West	Tennessee General Assembly	Seat established
	William B. Reese (1793–1859)	December 4, 1835 – October 1, 1847 (Retired)	East	Tennessee General Assembly	Seat established
	Nathan Green Sr. (1792–1866)	December 4, 1835 – September 27, 1852 (Retired)	Middle	Tennessee General Assembly	Seat established
	Robert J. McKinney (1803–1875)	December 1847 – September 13, 1862 (Court ceased operates due to the American Civil War)	East	Tennessee General Assembly	William B. Reese
	Archibald W. O. Totten (1809–1867)	February 28, 1850 – July 17, 1855 (Resigned)	West	Tennessee General Assembly	William B. Turley
	Robert L. Caruthers (1800–1882)	September 1852 – 1861 (Resigned)	Middle	William B. Campbell (W)	Nathan Green Sr.
	William R. Harris (1803–1858)	1855 – June 19, 1858 (Died)	West	Andrew Johnson (D)	Archibald W. O. Totten
	Archibald Wright (1809–1885)	June 19, 1858 – September 13, 1862 (Court ceased operates due to the American Civil War)	West	Isham G. Harris (D)	William R. Harris
	Edwin H. Ewing (?–?)	September 1861 – September 1861 (Lost re-election)	Middle	Isham G. Harris (D)	Robert L. Caruthers
	William Frierson Cooper (1820–1909)	December 1861 – September 13, 1862 (Court ceased operates due to the American Civil War)	Middle	Direct election	Edwin H. Ewing
	Samuel Milligan (1814–1874)	January 1865 – March 1867 (Resigned)	East	Andrew Johnson (D)	Robert J. McKinney
	Samuel Milligan (1814–1874)	1867 – July 1868 (Resigned)	East	Parson Brownlow (R)	Himself
	James O. Shackleford (?–?)	August 1865 – February 1867 (Resigned)	Middle	Parson Brownlow (R)	William Frierson Cooper
	Horace H. Harrison (1829–1885)	1867 – September 1868 (Resigned)	Middle	Parson Brownlow (R)	James O. Shackleford
	Alvin Hawkins (1821–1905)	1865 – 1868 (Resigned)	West	Parson Brownlow (R)	Archibald Wright
	James O. Shackleford (?–?)	1868 – 1869 (Lost re-election)	Middle	Parson Brownlow (R)	Horace H. Harrison
	Henry G. Smith (1807–1878)	1868 – 1869 (Lost re-election)	West	Parson Brownlow (R)	Alvin Hawkins
	Horace Maynard (1814–1882)	1868 (Appointed but never took his seat)	East	Parson Brownlow (R)	Samuel Milligan
	George Andrews (1826–1889)	1868 – ?	East	Parson Brownlow (R)	Horace Maynard
	Alvin Hawkins (1821–1905)	1869 – ?	West	Direct election	Henry G. Smith
	Andrew McClain (1826–1913)	1869 – ?	Middle	Direct election	James O. Shackleford
	Thomas A. R. Nelson (1812–1873)	1870 – December 1871 (Resigned)	East	Direct election	Court reorganized
	James W. Deaderick (1812–1890)	1870 – 1886 (Retired)	East	Direct election	Court reorganized
	Alfred O. P. Nicholson (1808–1876)	1870 – March 23, 1876 (Died)	Middle	Direct election	Court reorganized
	Peter Turney (1827–1903)	1870 – 1893 (Resigned)	At large	Direct election	Court reorganized
	John L. T. Sneed (1820–1901)	1870 – 1878 (Lost re-nomination)	West	Direct election	Court reorganized
	Thomas J. Freeman (1827–1891)	1870 – 1886 (Lost re-election)	West	Direct election	Court reorganized
	Robert McFarland (1832–1884)	December 1871 – 1882 (Resigned)	East	John C. Brown (D)	Thomas A. R. Nelson
	William Frierson Cooper (1820–1909)	1878 – 1886 (Lost re-election)	Middle	Direct election	John L. T. Sneed
	James Burch Cooke (1819–1899)	1884 – 1886 (Lost re-election)	East	William B. Bate (D)	Robert McFarland
	Waller C. Caldwell (1849–1924)	1886 – 1902 (?)	?	Direct election	?
	David L. Snodgrass (1851–1917)	September 1886 – September 1902 (Retired)	Middle	Direct election	?
	Horace H. Lurton (1844–1914)	1886 – 1893 (Resigned)	Middle	Direct election	?
	William C. Folkes (1845–1890)	1886 – May 15, 1890 (Died)	?	Direct election	?
	William Dwight Beard (1835–1910)	1890 – 1890 (Lost re-election)	West	Robert Love Taylor (D)	William C. Folkes
	Benjamin J. Lea (1833–1894)	1890 – March 15, 1894 (Died)	Middle	Direct election	William Dwight Beard
	John Summerfield Wilkes (1841–1908)	January 16, 1893 – February 2, 1908 (Died)	Middle	?	Peter Turney
	William King McAlister (1850–1923)	April 1, 1893 – 1910 (?)	Middle	Peter Turney (D)	Horace H. Lurton
	A. D. Bright (1838–1898)	March 16, 1894 – September 1, 1894 (?)	?	Peter Turney (D)	Benjamin J. Lea
	William Dwight Beard (1835–1910)	1894 – December 7, 1910 (Died)	West	Direct election	A. D. Bright
	Matthew M. Neil (1849–1925)	1902 – 1918 (?)	At large	Direct election	?
	John Knight Shields (1858–1934)	1902 – February 12, 1913 (Resigned)	East	Direct election	David L. Snodgrass
	Bennett Douglas Bell (1852–1934)	February 7, 1908 – 1910 (Lost re-election)	?	Malcolm R. Patterson (D)	John Summerfield Wilkes
	Grafton Green (1872–1947)	1910 – January 27, 1947 (Died)	At large	Direct election	?
	D. L. Lansden (1869–1924)	1910 – April 11, 1923 (Resigned)	Middle	Direct election	?
	Arthur S. Buchanan (1856–1919)	December 17, 1910 – December 1917 (Resigned)	?	Malcolm R. Patterson (D)	William Dwight Beard
	Samuel Cole Williams (1864–1947)	1913 – 1918 (?)	East	Ben W. Hooper (R)	John Knight Shields
	Francis Fentress (1873–1930)	January 1918 – September 1, 1918 (?)	West	Thomas Clarke Rye (D)	Arthur S. Buchanan
	Frank P. Hall (1870–1926)	1918 – July 10, 1926 (Died)	West	Direct election	?
	Colin P. McKinney (1873–1944)	1918 – September 1, 1942 (Retired)	?	Direct election	?
	Nathan Lynn Bachman (1878–1937)	1918 – September 8, 1923 (Resigned)	East	Direct election	?
	William Loch Cook (1869–1942)	April 12, 1923 – March 5, 1942 (Died)	Middle	Austin Peay (D)	D. L. Lansden
	Alexander W. Chambliss (1864–1947)	September 22, 1923 – October 1, 1947 (Died)	East	Austin Peay (D)	Nathan Lynn Bachman
	William H. Swiggart (1888–1966)	1926 – 1934 (Resigned)	?	Direct election	?
	David W. DeHaven (1872–1943)	January 21, 1935 – June 4, 1943 (Died)	West	Hill McAlister (D)	William H. Swiggart
	A. B. Neil (1873–1966)	March 9, 1942 – February 1, 1960 (Retired)	Middle	Prentice Cooper (D)	William Loch Cook
	Alan M. Prewitt (1893–1963)	1942 – February 17, 1963 (Died)	?	Direct election	Colin P. McKinney
	Frank H. Gailor (1892–1954)	June 7, 1943 – April 8, 1954 (Died)	West	Prentice Cooper (D)	David W. DeHaven
	Pride Tomlinson (1890–1967)	February 1, 1947 – July 31, 1961 (Retired)	Middle	Jim Nance McCord (D)	Grafton Green
	Hamilton S. Burnett (1895–1973)	October 3, 1947 – September 1969 (Resigned)	East	Jim Nance McCord (D)	Alexander W. Chambliss
	John E. Swepston (1894–1961)	April 12, 1954 – September 15, 1961 (Retired)	West	Frank G. Clement (D)	Frank H. Gailor
	Sam L. Felts (1889–1977)	February 1, 1960 – January 1, 1965 (Retired)	Middle	Buford Ellington (D)	A. B. Neil
	Weldon B. White (1907–1967)	August 1, 1961 – April 23, 1967 (Died)	Middle	Buford Ellington (D)	Pride Tomlinson
	Ross W. Dyer (1911–1993)	September 15, 1961 – September 2, 1974 (Lost re-nomination)	East	Buford Ellington (D)	John E. Swepston
	Andrew O. Holmes (1906–1965)	February 1963 – July 24, 1965 (Died)	West	Frank G. Clement (D)	Alan M. Prewitt
	Chester C. Chattin (1907–1979)	January 1, 1965 – September 2, 1974 (Retired)	Middle	Frank G. Clement (D)	Sam L. Felts
	Larry Barkley Creson (1909–1972)	August 1, 1965 – June 19, 1972 (Died)	West	Buford Ellington (D)	Andrew O. Holmes
	Allison B. Humphreys (1906–1993)	April 27, 1967 – September 2, 1974 (Retired)	Middle	Buford Ellington (D)	Weldon B. White
	George F. McCanless (1904–1992)	September 1, 1969 – September 2, 1974 (Retired)	East	Buford Ellington (D)	Hamilton S. Burnett
	William Fones (1917–2010)	May 14, 1973 – August 1990 (Retired)	West	Winfield Dunn (R) (Note: Justice Fones was an independent.)	Larry Barkley Creson
	Robert E. Cooper Sr. (1920–2016)	September 2, 1974 – 1990 (Lost re-nomination)	East	Direct election (Democratic Party nominee)	George F. McCanless
	Joe W. Henry (1916–1980)	September 2, 1974 – June 9, 1980 (Died)	Middle	Direct election (Democratic Party nominee)	Chester C. Chattin / Allison B. Humphreys
	Ray L. Brock Jr. (1922–2002)	September 2, 1974 – June 15, 1987 (Resigned)	East	Direct election (Democratic Party nominee)	Ross W. Dyer
	William J. Harbison (1923–1993)	September 2, 1974 – March 1990 (Resigned)	Middle	Direct election (Democratic Party nominee)	Chester C. Chattin / Allison B. Humphreys
	George H. Brown Jr. (born 1939)	June 23, 1980 – August 7, 1980 (Lost re-election)	West	Lamar Alexander (R)	Joe W. Henry
	Frank F. Drowota III (1938–2018)	September 1980 – September 2, 2005 (Retired)	Middle	Direct election (Democratic Party nominee)	George H. Brown Jr.
	Charles H. O'Brien (1920–2007)	1987 – October 1994 (Resigned)	East	Ned McWherter (D)	Ray L. Brock Jr.
	Martha Craig Daughtrey (born 1942)	April 23, 1990 – November 22, 1993 (Resigned)	Middle	Ned McWherter (D)	William J. Harbison
	Lyle Reid (born 1930)	August 1990 – March 1, 1998 (Resigned)	West	Direct election (Democratic Party nominee)	William Fones
	E. Riley Anderson (1932–2018)	August 1990 – August 31, 2006 (Retired)	East	Direct election (Democratic Party nominee)	Robert E. Cooper Sr.
	A. A. Birch Jr. (1932–2011)	December 1993 – August 31, 2006 (Retired)	Middle	Ned McWherter (D)	Martha Craig Daughtrey
	Penny J. White (born 1956)	December 1994 – November 1996 (Lost re-election)	East	Ned McWherter (D)	Charles H. O'Brien
	Janice M. Holder (born 1949)	December 13, 1996 – August 31, 2014 (Retired)	West	Don Sundquist (R)	Penny J. White
	William M. Barker (1941–2023)	April 1998 – September 1, 2008 (Retired)	East	Don Sundquist (R)	Lyle Reid
	Cornelia Clark (1950–2021)	September 19, 2005 – September 24, 2021 (Died)	Middle	Phil Bredesen (D)	Frank F. Drowota III
	Gary R. Wade (born 1948)	September 1, 2006 – September 8, 2015 (Retired)	East	Phil Bredesen (D)	E. Riley Anderson
	William C. Koch Jr. (born 1947)	June 15, 2007 – July 15, 2014 (Retired)	Middle	Phil Bredesen (D)	A. A. Birch Jr.
	Sharon G. Lee (born 1953)	March 20, 2009 – August 31, 2023 (Retired)	East	Phil Bredesen (D)	William M. Barker
	Jeffrey S. Bivins (born 1960)	July 16, 2014 – Incumbent	Middle	Bill Haslam (R)	William C. Koch Jr.
	Holly M. Kirby (born 1957)	September 1, 2014 – June 30, 2026 (Retired)	West	Bill Haslam (R)	Janice M. Holder
	Roger A. Page (born 1955)	February 22, 2016 – August 31, 2024 (Retired)	West	Bill Haslam (R)	Gary R. Wade
	Sarah K. Campbell (born 1982)	February 10, 2022 – Incumbent	Middle	Bill Lee (R)	Cornelia Clark
	Dwight E. Tarwater (born 1955)	September 1, 2023 – Incumbent	East	Bill Lee (R)	Sharon G. Lee
	Mary L. Wagner (born 1984)	September 1, 2024 – Incumbent	West	Bill Lee (R)	Roger A. Page
	Kyle Hixson (born 1983)	July 1, 2026 – Incumbent	East	Bill Lee (R)	Holly M. Kirby

=== Chief Justices ===
The following is an incomplete list of those who have served as Chief Justice of the Tennessee Supreme Court:

- Alfred O. P. Nicholson, 1870 – March 23, 1876
- James W. Deaderick, 1876–1886
- Peter Turney, 1886–1893
- Horace H. Lurton, January 17, 1893 – 1893
- Benjamin J. Lea, 1893 – March 15, 1894
- David L. Snodgrass, 1894–1902
- William Dwight Beard, 1902–1910
- John Knight Shields, 1910 – February 12, 1913
- Matthew M. Neil, February 17, 1913 – 1918
- D. L. Lansden, 1918 – April 11, 1923
- Grafton Green, August 12, 1923 – January 27, 1947
- Alexander W. Chambliss, February 3, 1947 – October 1, 1947
- A. B. Neil, October 6, 1947 – February 1, 1960
- Alan M. Prewitt, February 1, 1960 – February 17, 1963
- Hamilton S. Burnett, 1963 – September 1, 1969
- Ross W. Dyer, September 1, 1969 – September 1, 1974
- Ray L. Brock Jr. July 1, 1979 – ?
- Joe W. Henry, 1979 – June 9, 1980
- William J. Harbison, 1980–1982
- William J. Harbison, 1987–1989
- Frank F. Drowota III, January 1989 – September 1990
- Lyle Reid, 1990–1994
- E. Riley Anderson, October 1994 – May 1996
- A. A. Birch Jr., May 1996 – July 1997
- E. Riley Anderson, July 8, 1997 – August 1998
- E. Riley Anderson, September 1998 – ?
- Frank F. Drowota III, August 2002 – September 2, 2005
- William M. Barker, October 2005 – September 1, 2008
