= Waller C. Caldwell =

American judge in Tennessee (1849–1924)

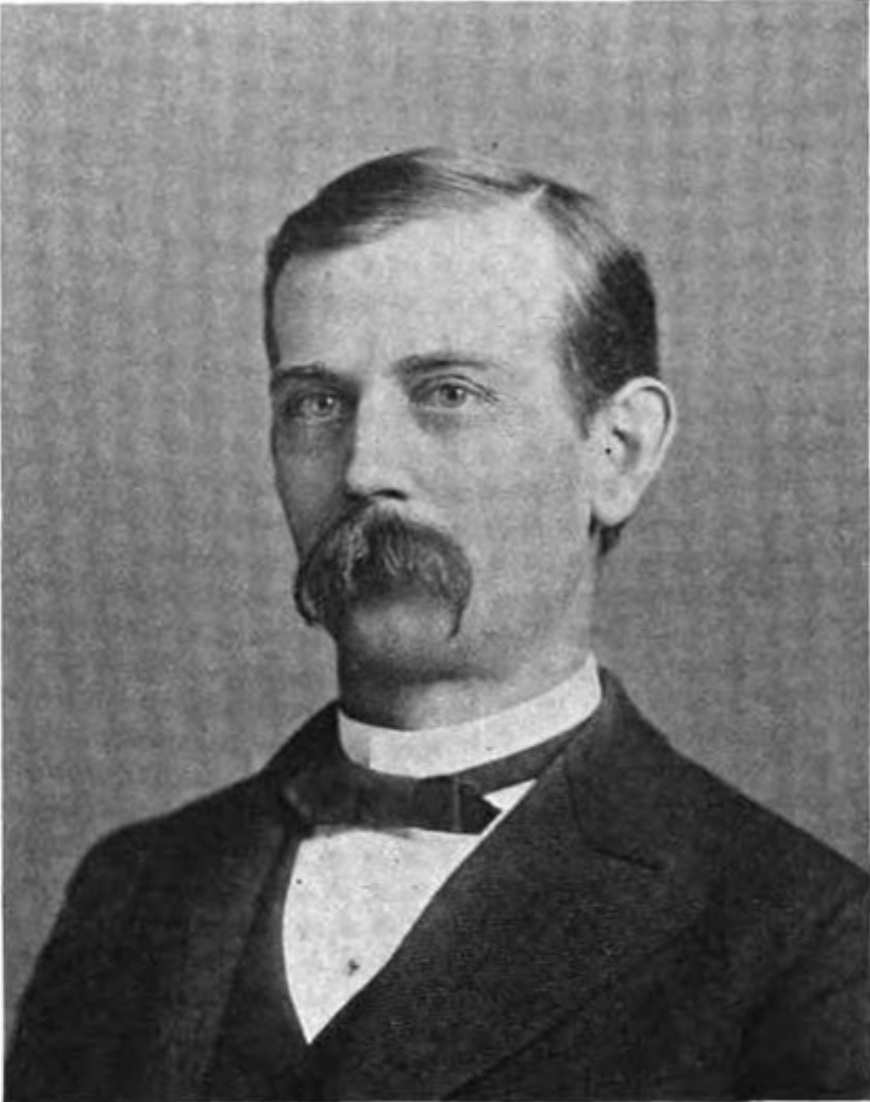
Justice Waller C. Caldwell

Waller C. Caldwell (May 14, 1849 – December 23, 1924) was a Tennessee lawyer and judge who served as a justice of the Tennessee Supreme Court from 1886 to 1902.

== Early life, education, and career ==
Caldwell was born in Obion County, Tennessee. His father died when he was three years old, and Caldwell eventually supported his widowed mother and his own education. After receiving a common-school education, he attended Cumberland University, receiving an undergraduate degree in 1871 and an LL.B. from the law department of the same institution in 1872. He was a member of Beta Theta Pi.

Following his graduation, Caldwell practiced law at Trenton, Tennessee, until 1883, when he was appointed a member of the Commission of Referees for the middle division of the state.

== Judicial service and later life ==
After serving on the Commission of Referees from 1883 to May 1886, Caldwell ran for a seat on the state supreme court. He was one of only two candidates running from West Tennessee in the 1886 election, and was nominated on the first ballot by the convention, receiving on the call of the roll a larger vote than was cast for any other candidate. A contemporaneous biography of Caldwell in The Green Bag stated:

He has an immense capacity for labor, and is the master of details, being gifted with an unusually good memory. He can handle a complicated record better than any man on the bench. His opinions are always carefully prepared, and are never handed down until perfectly finished in every part. Judge Caldwell has the unusual faculty of exact statement. The doctrines meant to be enunciated are accurately given, and the position taken shown; and his opinions do not have to be continually limited and explained.

He was noted for expertise in two areas of law in particular, those being the law of common carriers and of taxation.

Caldwell was reelected 1894, serving as a member of the court until 1902, when he voluntarily retired and resumed the practice of law. He retired from active practice some years before his death.

== Personal life and death ==
On October 22, 1874, Caldwell married Ella Green, daughter of Cumberland Chancellor Nathan Green Jr. and granddaughter of former Tennessee Supreme Court Justice Nathan Green Sr. Caldwell was thereby the brother-in-law of Grafton Green, who later served as chief justice of the same court. With Ella, Caldwell had a son and two daughters.

Caldwell died at his family's winter home at Lakeland, Florida, at the age of 75. His body was transported to Trenton, Tennessee, the following day, where he funeral was held the next day after that.

Political offices
Preceded by Newly reconstituted court	Justice of the Tennessee Supreme Court; 1886–1902	Succeeded by Matthew M. Neil
