= Justice McKinney =

Justice McKinney may refer to:

- Colin P. McKinney (1873–1944), associate justice of the Tennessee Supreme Court
- John T. McKinney (1785–1837), associate justice of the Supreme Court of Indiana
- Robert J. McKinney (1803–1875), associate justice of the Tennessee Supreme Court
