= Luke Edward Wright =

United States politician and diplomat (1846–1922)

Luke Wright
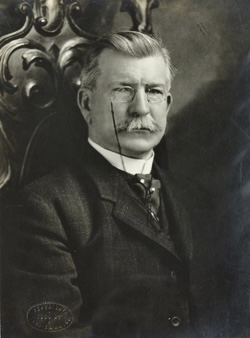

43rd United States Secretary of War
- In office July 1, 1908 – March 11, 1909
- President: Theodore Roosevelt
- Preceded by: William H. Taft
- Succeeded by: Jacob M. Dickinson

United States Ambassador to Japan
- In office May 26, 1906 – August 13, 1907
- President: Theodore Roosevelt
- Preceded by: Lloyd Carpenter Griscom (Minister)
- Succeeded by: Thomas O'Brien

Governor-General of the Philippines
- In office February 1, 1904 – November 3, 1905
- President: Theodore Roosevelt
- Preceded by: William H. Taft
- Succeeded by: Henry C. Ide

Governor of Palawan
- In office 1904–1905
- Preceded by: John Elmick
- Succeeded by: Edward Y. Miller

Vice Governor-General of the Philippines
- In office October 29, 1901 – January 31, 1904
- Preceded by: Position established
- Succeeded by: Henry Clay Ide

Personal details
- Born: Luke Edward Wright; August 29, 1846 Giles County, Tennessee, U.S.
- Died: November 17, 1922 (aged 76) Memphis, Tennessee, U.S.
- Resting place: Forest Hill Cemetery; Memphis, Tennessee, U.S.
- Party: Democratic (Before 1896); Republican (1896–1922)
- Spouse: Katherine Semmes
- Education: University of Mississippi, Oxford

Military service
- Allegiance: Confederate States
- Branch/service: Confederate States Army
- Years of service: 1862–1864
- Rank: Second Lieutenant
- Battles/wars: American Civil War: Battle of Murfreesboro

Luke Edward Wright (August 29, 1846 – November 17, 1922) was an American lawyer and politician who served as the Governor-General of the Philippines from 1904 to 1905, United States ambassador to Japan from 1906 to 1907, and Secretary of War from 1908 to 1909.

== Early life and education ==
Luke Edward Wright was born in Giles County, Tennessee, on August 29, 1846, to Archibald Wright. His family moved to Memphis in 1851, and his father became a member of the Tennessee Supreme Court in 1858.

== Civil War ==
Wright enlisted into the Confederate States Army at age 15 as a private in the Memphis Light Guards. He was promoted to lieutenant at age 16 for bravery and joined an artillery battery led by his older brother Eldridge Wright. Their father followed the army around on a mule despite being "old and crippled".

Wright fought at the battles of Belmont, Shiloh, Corinth, Jackson, Chickamauga, Missionary Ridge, Resaca, Atlanta, Franklin, Nashville, Mobile Bay, and Savannah. He was seriously wounded at the Battle of Jonesborough. Eldridge was killed at the Battle of Stones River and his body was recovered by Wright.

== Career ==
=== Tennessee ===
Wright attended the University of Mississippi for a year and studied law in his father's office. He was admitted to the bar in Tennessee in 1868, and worked in a law firm with his father and William C. Folkes; Archibald died in 1884 and Folkes was elected to the Tennessee Supreme Court in 1886. A firm was formed by Wright and Thomas B. Turley, but Turley was appointed to the United States Senate in 1897.

Wright was elected attorney general of Shelby County at age 24. Wright became Tennessee Attorney General.

A yellow fever epidemic broke out in Memphis in 1878. The city saw 25,000 people flee while 17,000 of the remaining 20,000 people contracted yellow fever. Over 5,000 people died as a result of the epidemic. Wright remained in Memphis and was appoitned chair of the Committee of Public Health and Relief Committee. He met with black leaders and assured them that black and white people would be treated equally.

Alice Mitchell was placed on trial in 1892 for the murder of Freda Ward; Wright was her defense attorney and she was acquitted. During the trial Judge Julius DuBose threaten to have Wright placed in handcuffs, but relented after Wright threatened that one of them would die if he attempted that. In 1893, Wright prosecuted DuBose during an impeachment trial and DuBose was successfully removed from office. Wright defended Chief Justice David Snodgrass, who was placed on trial in 1896 for wounding a lawyer after he criticized a court decision; Snodgrass was acquitted. Duncan Brown Cooper was charged in 1910 with killing U.S. Senator Edward W. Carmack.

Wright was a member of the Democratic Party, became Tennessee Attorney General, but switched parties to join the Republican Party due to his opposition to William Jennings Bryan and his support for the gold standard.

=== Philippines ===
President William McKinley appointed Wright to a commission governing the Insular Government of the Philippine Islands in 1900. Governor-General William Howard Taft decentralized authority and shared decision making while he oversaw the Philippines. He selected Wright to oversee policing, the criminal code, franchises, and public improvements. President Theodore Roosevelt appointed Wright to succeed Taft as governor-general.

On March 27, 1905, Wright announced elections for the newly formed Philippine Legislature.

=== Ambassador and Secretary of War ===
Roosevelt appointed Wright as United States ambassador to Japan on January 25, 1906, and presented his credentials on May 26. His tenure ended on August 13, 1907. Wright was the first full ambassador to Japan from the United States.

Roosevelt appointed Wright to succeed Taft as United States Secretary of War in 1908. The use of airplanes in the American military was pioneered under Wright. Wright spoke at Abraham Lincoln's birthplace on the centennial of his birth and stated about the Confederate States of America that "It was best that it did fail." Taft promised Roosevelt that he would keep Wright as Secretary of War, but he dismissed him.

== Personal life ==
Wright's son and law partner Eldridge Wright was killed in a railroad accident in 1912, and took on Eldridge's caseload. Luke Wright Jr. died of hearth failure in 1912. Wright died on November 17, 1922, after falling. He was buried in the Forest Hill Cemetery.

== Works cited ==
=== Books ===
- Rockwell, Stephen (2023). The Presidency and the American State: Leadership and Decision Making in the Adams, Grant, and Taft Administrations. University of Virginia Press. ISBN 9780813950075.

=== Journals ===
- Mount, Guy (2024). ""Shall I Go?": Black Colonization in the Pacific, 1840–1914". Journal of the Civil War Era. 14 (4). University of North Carolina Press: 512–540. doi:10.2307/27353759. JSTOR 27353759.
- Suzuki, Nobutaka (2013). "Upholding Filipino nationhood: The debate over Mindanao in the Philippine Legislature, 1907-1913". Journal of Southeast Asian Studies. 44 (2). Cambridge University Press: 266–291. doi:10.2307/43863028. JSTOR 43863028.

=== Newspapers ===
- "Wright Funeral Today". The Baltimore Sun. November 19, 1922. p. 10 – via Newspapers.com.

=== Web ===
- "Luke Edward Wright (1846–1922)". United States Department of State. Archived from the original on November 12, 2026.
- Fowler, Russell (November 1, 2022). "Luke Wright: The Lawyer Who Saved Memphis". Tennessee Bar Association. Archived from the original on November 12, 2026.

Government offices
Preceded by William Howard Taft	U.S. Secretary of War; Served under: Theodore Roosevelt; 1908–1909	Succeeded by Jacob M. Dickinson
Preceded by William Howard Taft	Civil Governor of the Philippines; February 1, 1904 – April 1, 1906	Succeeded by Henry Clay Ide
Diplomatic posts
Preceded by Lloyd Carpenter Griscom; Envoy to Japan	United States Ambassador to Japan; 1906–1907	Succeeded by Thomas J. O'Brien
