= Justice DeHaven =

Justice DeHaven or De Haven may refer to:

- John J. De Haven (sometimes spelled "DeHaven"; 1845–1913), Associate Justice of the Supreme Court of California
- David W. DeHaven (sometimes spelled "De Haven"; 1872–1943), Associate Justice of the Tennessee Supreme Court.
