= Ross Dyer (disambiguation) =

Ross Dyer (born 1977) is a British sports and entertainment broadcaster. Ross Dyer may also refer to:

- Ross Dyer (footballer) (born 1988), an English semi-professional footballer
- Ross W. Dyer (1911–1993), Chief Justice of the Tennessee Supreme Court
