= Prewitt =

Prewitt is a surname. Notable people with the surname include:

- Alan M. Prewitt (1893–1963), Chief Justice of the Tennessee Supreme Court
- Archer Prewitt (born 1963), American musician and cartoonist
- Bob Prewitt (1924–2018), American college basketball coach
- Cheryl Prewitt (born 1957), American Christian evangelist, author, musician and former beauty pageant titleholder
- Cody Prewitt (born 1992), American football player
- Clifton Blackburn Prewitt (1826–1902), African American real estate developer, formerly enslaved
- Hal Prewitt (born 1954), American artist, photographer, race car driver, businessman and inventor
- Ken Prewitt (1946–2015), American radio news anchor
- Kenneth Prewitt (born 1936), American government official

== See also ==
- Ditto-Prewitt House
- Prewitt, New Mexico
- Prewitt operator
