= Justice Humphreys =

Justice Humphreys may refer to:

- Allison B. Humphreys (1906–1993), associate justice of the Tennessee Supreme Court
- David Campbell Humphreys (1817–1879), associate justice of the Supreme Court of the District of Columbia
- Parry Wayne Humphreys (1778–1839), associate justice of the Tennessee Supreme Court
- T. H. Humphreys (1865–1951), associate justice of the Arkansas Supreme Court

== See also ==
- Thomas E. Humphrey, an associate justice of the Maine Supreme Judicial Court
- Judge Humphreys (disambiguation)
