= Justice Shackleford =

Justice Shackleford may refer to:

- James O. Shackleford (1809–1883), associate justice of the Tennessee Supreme Court
- Thomas M. Shackleford (1859–1927), associate justice of the Florida Supreme Court
