= Senator Chambliss (disambiguation) =

Saxby Chambliss (born 1943) was a U.S. Senator from Georgia from 2003 to 2015. Senator Chambliss may also refer to:

- Alexander W. Chambliss (1864–1947), Tennessee State Senate
- Clyde Chambliss (born 1969), Alabama State Senate
