= Justice McClain =

Justice McClain may refer to:

- Andrew McClain (1826–1913), associate justice of the Tennessee Supreme Court
- Emlin McClain (1851–1915), associate justice of the Iowa Supreme Court

== See also ==
- David McCain (1931–1986), associate justice of the Florida Supreme Court
- John McLean (1785–1861), associate justice of the Ohio Supreme Court and the U.S. Supreme Court
