= William Wilcox Cooke =

American judge (died 1816)

William Wilcox Cooke (died July 20, 1816) was a justice of the Tennessee Supreme Court from 1815 to 1816.

Cooke was "an eminent practitioner", in the state of Tennessee, "who had shortly before taken up the work of reporting the decisions of the Supreme Court, where it had been left off by [Justice John Overton], on Jan. 1, 1815", compiling volume 3 (1 Cooke) of Tennessee Reports. Cooke was appointed to the Tennessee Supreme Court by Governor Willie Blount on May 27, 1815, to succeed Justice Hugh Lawson White. Cooke then resigned to be reappointed to the court by the state legislature on October 21, 1815. He served for a year and two months, until "his judicial career was cut short by his untimely death".

Political offices
Preceded by Hugh Lawson White	Justice of the Tennessee Supreme Court; 1815–1816	Succeeded by John Haywood
