= George H. Brown Jr. =

American judge (born 1938)

Justice of the Tennessee Supreme Court
- In office June 23, 1980 – September 5, 1980
- Preceded by: Joe W. Henry
- Succeeded by: Frank Drowota

Personal details
- Born: 1939 (age 86–87) Memphis, Tennessee, U.S.
- Education: Florida A&M University (B.S.); Howard University School of Law (J.D.)
- Occupation: Lawyer, Judge
- Known for: First Black justice of the Tennessee Supreme Court

George H. Brown Jr. (born 1939) is a Tennessee lawyer who served as a justice of the Tennessee Supreme Court in 1980, and was the first black person to serve on that court.

Born in Memphis, Tennessee, Brown received a B.S. from Florida A&M University in 1960, and a J.D. from the Howard University School of Law in 1967. Brown was a conciliator for the Equal Employment Opportunity Commission from 1969 to 1971, and executive director for Memphis Area Legal Services from 1971 to 1973. He was elected to the Memphis school board in 1971, and in 1974 became the first black president of the board. He supported the unsuccessful gubernatorial bid of Lamar Alexander in 1974, and chaired Alexander's successful campaign for the same office in 1978.

On June 13, 1980, Alexander announced the appointment of Brown to a seat on the Tennessee Supreme Court vacated by the recent death of Justice Joe W. Henry. The appointment was challenged due to Brown not residing in the same division of Tennessee as the previous occupant of the seat, but Brown was sworn in to the sear on June 23, 1980. Brown also declared his candidacy for election to the seat as a Republican, but was defeated by Democratic nominee Frank Drowota in a special election on August 7, 1980, serving until Drowota was sworn in on September 5, 1980.

Brown then returned to private practive until being appointed as a Circuit Court judge of the Thirtieth Judicial District at Memphis, where he remained until his retirement from the bench in 2005. Following his retirement, he returned to private practice as a mediator and arbitrator.

Political offices
Preceded by Joe W. Henry	Justice of the Tennessee Supreme Court; 1980–1980	Succeeded by Frank Drowota
