= William Little Brown =

American judge (–)

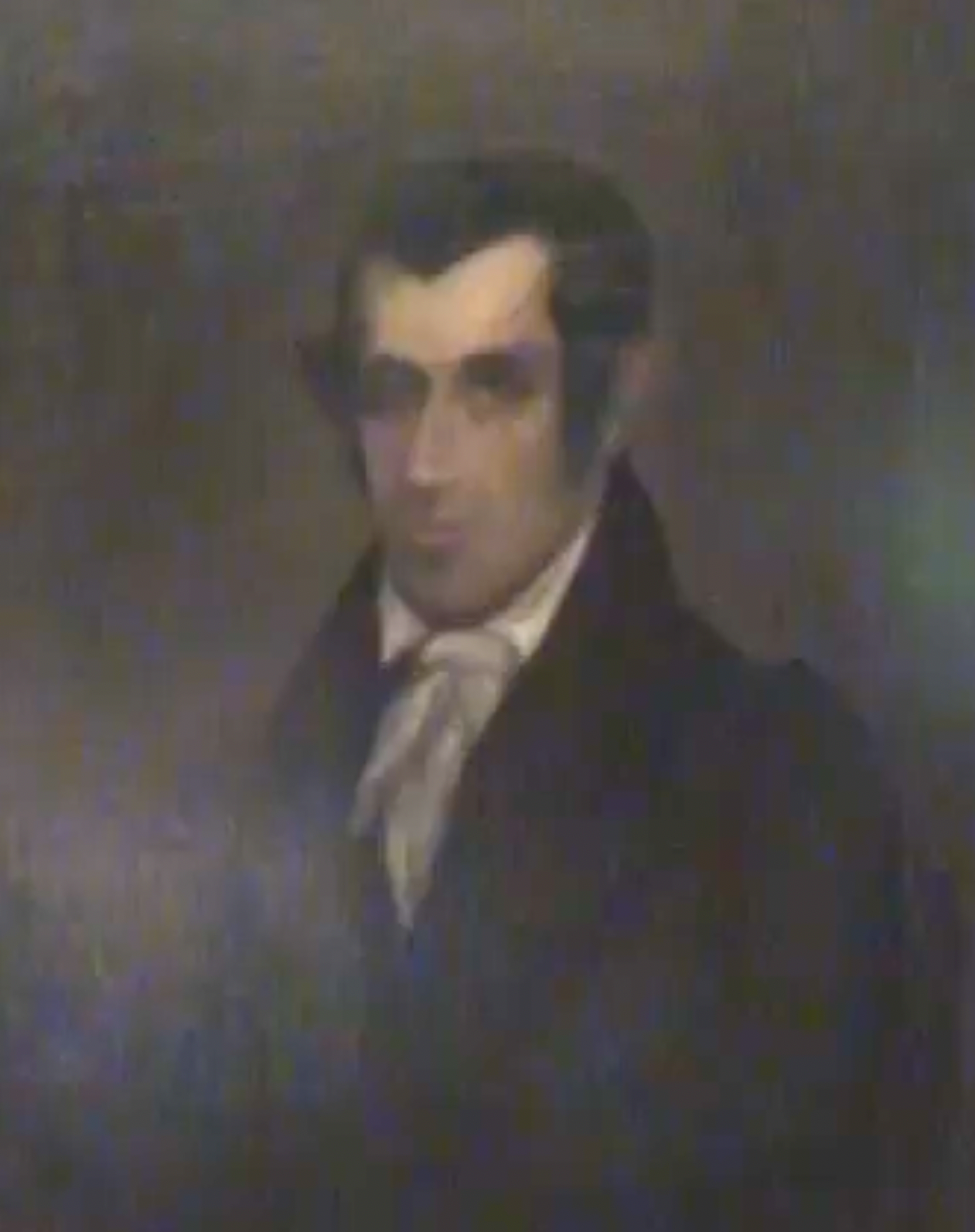
- Born: August 9, 1789; Near Cheraw, South Carolina
- Died: February 28, 1830 (aged 40); Near Nashville, Tennessee

William Little Brown (August 9, 1789 – February 28, 1830) was a justice of the Tennessee Supreme Court from 1822 to 1824.

Brown was born near Cheraw, South Carolina, to Morgan Brown and Elizabeth Little who laid out Palmyra, Tennessee. After attending Transylvania University, he studied law under John Haywood and Joseph H. Hawkins and was admitted to the bar in 1812.

He was appointed solicitor general by Governor Willie Blount in 1814, and elected as a member of the state senate in 1819. During his term in the senate, he negotiated a treaty regarding the Kentucky/Tennessee boundary line. He was elected to a judgeship on the state's Supreme Court in 1822, but resigned in July 1824 and died in his home called "Rose Cliff" near Nashville on February 28, 1830. The state supreme court ordered the publication of a "Tribute of Respect" for Brown a month thereafter, lauding his legal acumen.

Political offices
Preceded by Newly established seat	Justice of the Tennessee Supreme Court; 1822–1824	Succeeded by Thomas L. Williams
