= Alan M. Prewitt =

American judge (1893–1963)

Alan M. Prewitt (February 1, 1893 – February 17, 1963) was a justice of the Tennessee Supreme Court in 1937, and from 1941 to 1963.

Born in Grand Junction, Tennessee, Prewitt graduated from Vanderbilt University Law School, where he was captain of the Vanderbilt Commodores basketball team. He served in combat overseas during World War I, and later practiced law in Bolivar, Tennessee, where he "took all kinds of cases to keep eating".

He was appointed as a special judge of the Tennessee Court of Appeals in 1934, and as a special judge of the Tennessee Supreme Court in 1937, and again from April 1941 to March 1942, to assist in the absence of ailing justice W. L. Cook. Prewitt was elected in his own right in 1942, and re-elected in 1950 and 1958. On February 1, 1960, he was elected chief justice to succeed A. B. Neil, who had retired.

Prewitt served in that capacity until his death due to a heart ailment at the age of 70.

Political offices
| Preceded by Colin P. McKinney | Justice of the Tennessee Supreme Court; 1941–1963 | Succeeded by Andrew O. Holmes |
