= Benjamin J. Lea =

American judge (1833–1894)

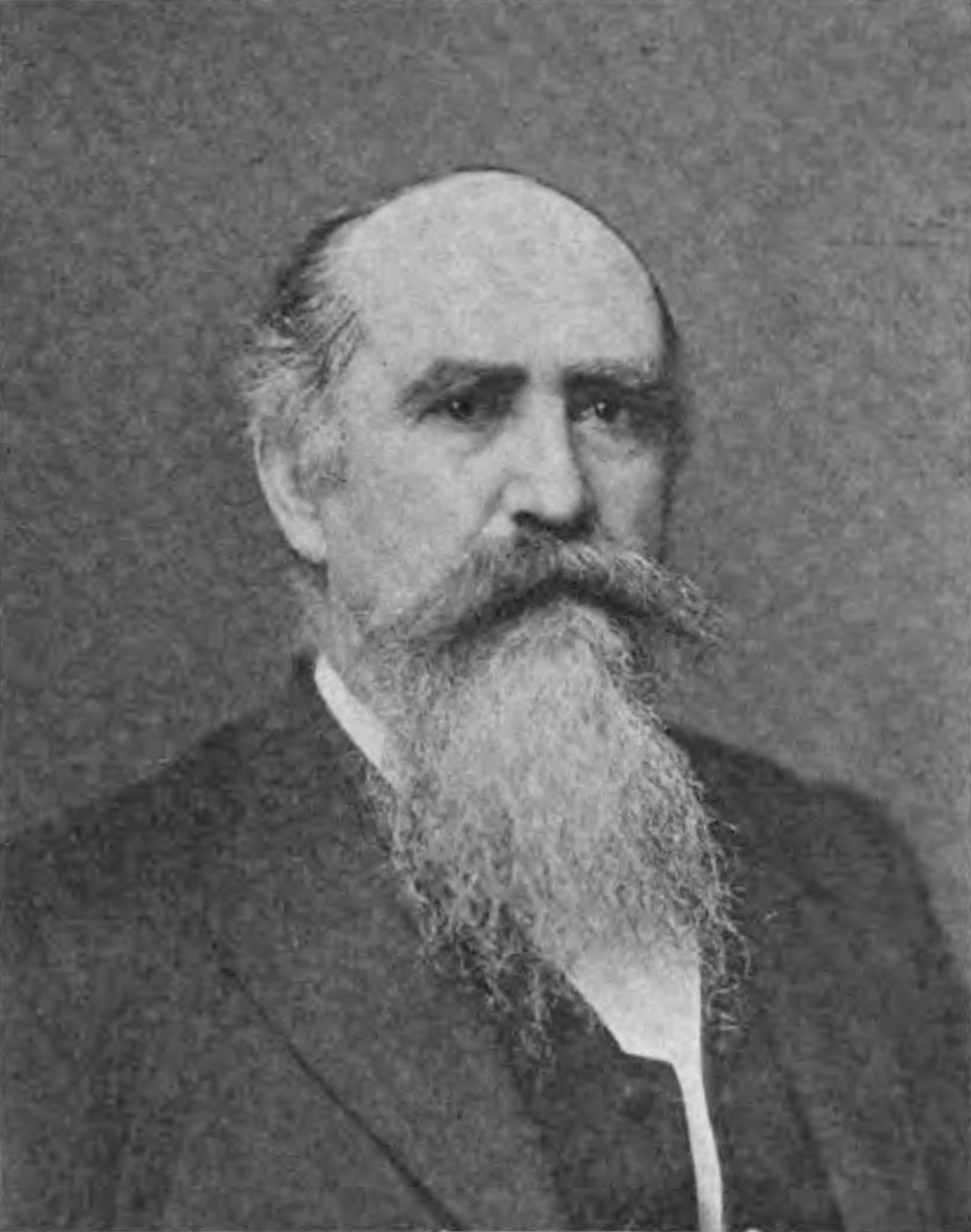
Benjamin J. Lea

Benjamin James Lea (January 1, 1833 – March 15, 1894) was an American lawyer and politician, who served as a justice on the Tennessee Supreme Court from 1876 to 1878, and again from 1890 to 1894.

Born in Caswell County, North Carolina, Lea graduated from Wake Forest College in 1852, and moved to Tennessee, where he taught between 1852 and 1856 as a teacher in Haywood County. He studied law to be admitted to the bar in 1856, and became a lawyer in Brownsville, Tennessee. At the same time he made a political career as a member of the Democratic Party. He was elected to represent Haywood County in the Tennessee legislature in 1859, serving until 1861. He then served in the Confederate Army during the American Civil War, achieving the rank of colonel. In 1865, shortly before the end of the war he was taken prisoner.

In 1876, Lea was appointed to the Tennessee Supreme Court. From 1878 to 1886 he held the office of Attorney General, during which time he compiled volumes 70-84 of Tennessee Reports. In 1889 he became a member and president of the Tennessee State Senate, also serving as a deputy to Governor Robert Love Taylor, and de facto vice-governor. In 1890, he was again elected to the Tennessee Supreme Court, defeating William Dwight Beard for election to the seat to which Beard had been appointed following the death of William C. Folkes. Lea was elected Chief Justice in April 1893, serving until his death the following year, in Brownsville.

Legal offices
Preceded by Joseph B. Heiskell	Attorney General of Tennessee; 1878–1886	Succeeded by George W. Pickle
Political offices
Preceded by Alfred O. P. Nicholson; William Dwight Beard	Justice of the Tennessee Supreme Court; 1876–1878; 1890–1894	Succeeded by William Frierson Cooper; A. D. Bright
