= Hamilton S. Burnett =

American judge (1895–1973)

Hamilton S. Burnett (August 20, 1895 – May 1, 1973) was an associate justice of the Tennessee Supreme Court from 1947 to 1963, and then chief justice of the Court until 1969.

== Biography ==
Born in Jefferson County, Tennessee, Burnett received an undergraduate degree from Carson–Newman University, served a short stint in the United States Army, and received a law degree from the University of Virginia School of Law. After briefly practicing law in the office of an uncle in Richmond, Virginia, Burnett moved to Knoxville County (later Knox County), Tennessee, in 1924. In 1934, Burnett became a circuit judge in Knox County, remaining in that position until 1942, when he became a judge of Court of Appeals of Tennessee.

On October 3, 1947, Governor Jim Nance McCord appointed Burnett to a seat on the state supreme court vacated by the death of Alexander W. Chambliss. Burnett was then re-elected to the seat in 1948, 1950, and 1958. On February 28, 1963, he became chief justice of the court, remaining in this position until his retirement in September 1969.

== Death ==
Burnett died at St. Mary's Hospital in Knoxville following hip surgery there, at the age of 77.

Political offices
| Preceded by Alexander W. Chambliss | Justice of the Tennessee Supreme Court; 1947–1969 | Succeeded by George F. McCanless |
