= Andrew O. Holmes =

American judge (1906–1965)

Andrew O. Holmes (May 4, 1906 – July 24, 1965) was a justice of the Tennessee Supreme Court from 1963 until his death in 1965.

== Early life and education ==
Born in Hernando, Mississippi, Holmes moved with his family to Memphis, Tennessee in 1911, and attended Messick High School and Memphis University School before receiving a B.S. from Vanderbilt University in 1927. While at Vanderbilt, he joined Sigma Alpha Epsilon fraternity and managed the school football team. He was admitted to the practice of law in Tennessee in 1928, and received an LL.B., also from Vanderbilt University, in 1929.

== Career and military service ==
In 1941, he was elected to the Tennessee General Assembly. He served in the United States Navy during World War II, from 1942 to 1945, spending seventeen months as an Air Combat Intelligence Officer assigned to the aircraft carrier USS Kitkun Bay in the Pacific Ocean, and achieving the rank of lieutenant commander before the completion of his service in 1945.

In March 1947 he was appointed to a seat on the Circuit Court in Shelby County, where he remained until February 1963, when Governor Frank G. Clement appointed Holmes to a seat on the state supreme court vacated by the death of Chief Justice Alan Prewitt.

== Personal life and death ==
In 1929, Holmes married Mary Fitzhugh of Memphis, who survived him. He died at Memphis Methodist Hospital at the age of 59, following a heart attack at his home.

Political offices
Preceded by Alan M. Prewitt	Justice of the Tennessee Supreme Court; 1963–1965	Succeeded by Larry Creson
