= Jacob M. Dickinson =

American politician (1851–1928)

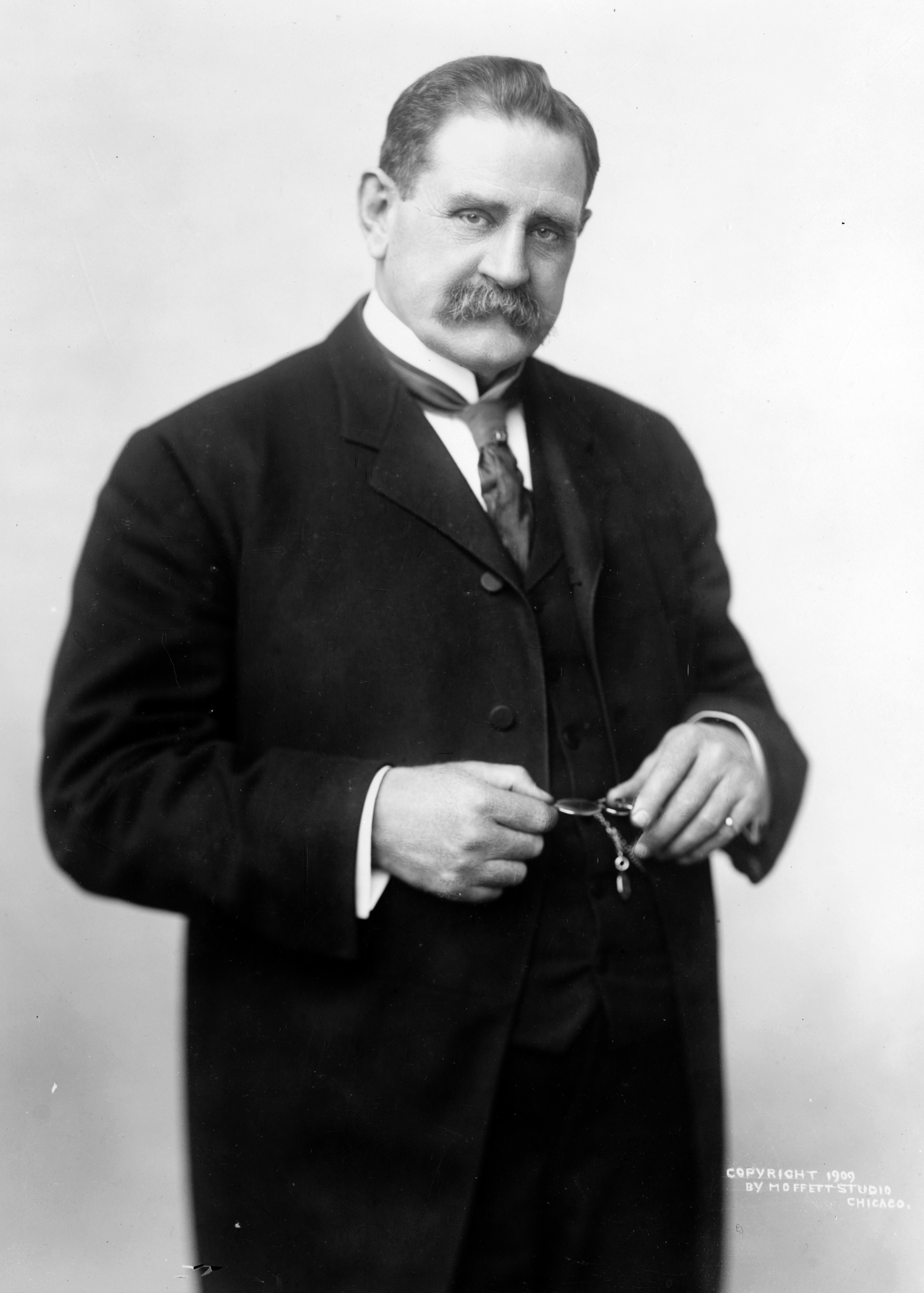
- Dickinson, c. 1909

44th United States Secretary of War
- In office March 12, 1909 – May 21, 1911
- President: William Howard Taft
- Preceded by: Luke Edward Wright
- Succeeded by: Henry L. Stimson

Personal details
- Born: Jacob McGavock Dickinson; January 30, 1851 Columbus, Mississippi, U.S.
- Died: December 13, 1928 (aged 77) Nashville, Tennessee, U.S.
- Party: Democratic
- Spouse: Martha Overton
- Education: University of Nashville (BA, MA); Columbia University

Military service
- Allegiance: United States; Confederate States
- Branch/service: Confederate States Army
- Rank: Private
- Unit: Mississippi State Militia
- Battles/wars: American Civil War

Jacob McGavock Dickinson (January 30, 1851 – December 13, 1928) was United States Secretary of War under President William Howard Taft from 1909 to 1911. He was succeeded by Henry L. Stimson. He was an attorney, politician, and businessman in Nashville, Tennessee, where he also taught at Nashville University. He came to have a national role after moving to Chicago, Illinois, in 1899.

== Early life ==
Jacob McGavock Dickinson was born on January 30, 1851, in Columbus, Mississippi. His father, Henry Dickinson, served as a chancery judge in Mississippi from 1843 to 1854. His mother was Anne McGavock. His maternal great-grandfather was Felix Grundy.

During the American Civil War of 1861–1865, Dickinson enlisted at fourteen as a private in the Confederate States Army. Dickinson moved with his family to Nashville, Tennessee, where he graduated from the University of Nashville in 1871, and received his master's degree in 1872. While in college, he was a member of Sigma Alpha Epsilon. He studied law briefly at Columbia Law School and continued his studies abroad in Leipzig and Paris. He spoke German. He was admitted to the Tennessee bar in 1874.

== Career ==
Dickinson built his law practice. From 1889 to 1893, Dickinson served as president of the Tennessee Bar Association. He served on the Tennessee Supreme Court from 1891 to 1893. He served as Assistant Attorney General of the United States from 1895 to 1897. From 1897 to 1899, he was a Professor of Law at the Vanderbilt University Law School and an attorney for the Louisville & Nashville Railroad.

In 1899 Dickinson moved to Chicago, Illinois. He became general solicitor for the Illinois Central Railroad, a position he held from 1899 to 1901. Dickinson later became general counsel for that railroad, a position he held from 1901 to 1909. He was a counsel for the Alaskan Boundary Tribunal in 1903, and was president of the American Bar Association from 1907 to 1908. Dickinson helped organize the American Society of International Law, served on its executive council from 1907 to 1910, and was its vice president in 1910.

From March 12, 1909, to May 21, 1911, Dickinson served as United States Secretary of War. Despite being a Democrat, he was appointed as Secretary of War by Republican President William Howard Taft because the President wanted the South to be represented in his Cabinet. During Dickinson's tenure, he proposed legislation to permit the admission of foreign students to West Point, and recommended an annuity retirement system for civil service employees. He also suggested that Congress consider stopping the pay of soldiers rendered unfit for duty because of venereal disease or alcoholism as a means of combatting those problems.

After his tenure as Secretary of War, Dickinson served as a special assistant attorney general and helped to prosecute U.S. Steel in 1913. He also acted in several important labor cases in 1922. He later was receiver of the Rock Island Lines from 1915 to 1917 and was president of the Izaak Walton League from 1927 until 1928.

== Personal life ==
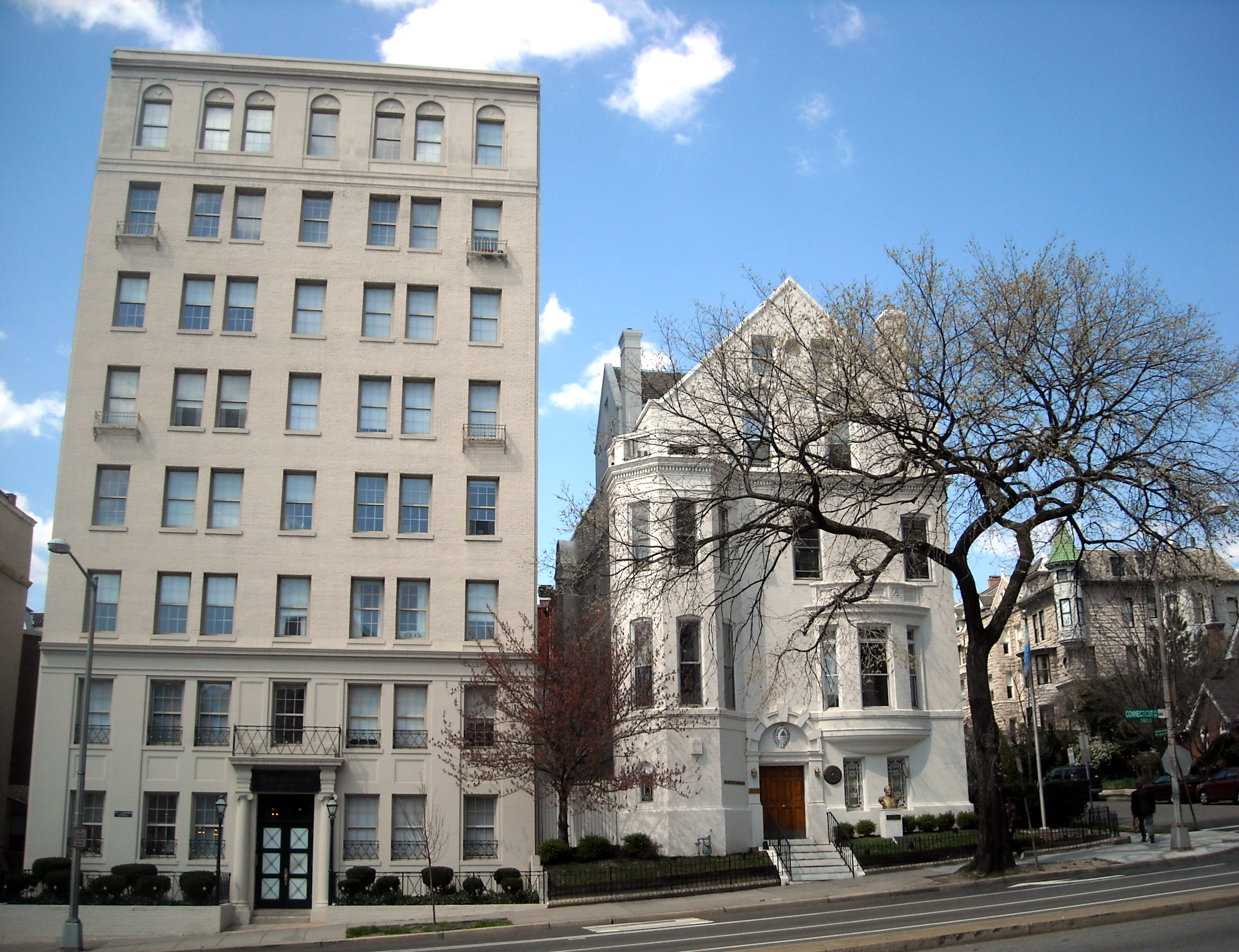
Dickinson's former residence (right) in Washington, D.C.

Dickinson married Martha Overton in 1876. They resided at 1808–1810 Connecticut Avenue in Washington, D.C.

== Death ==
Dickinson died in 1928 in Nashville, Tennessee.

Political offices
Preceded by Luke E. Wright	U.S. Secretary of War; Served under: William Howard Taft; March 12, 1909 – May 21, 1911	Succeeded by Henry L. Stimson
Business positions
Preceded by Henry U. Mudge	President of Chicago, Rock Island and Pacific Railroad; 1915–1917	Succeeded by James E. Gorman
