= Howell Tatum =

American judge (died 1822)

Howell Tatum (died 1822) was a justice of the Tennessee Supreme Court from 1797 to 1798.

Born in North Carolina, Tatum was a soldier in the American Revolutionary War, serving as an ensign in the First North Carolina Regiment, Continental Line, in 1775.

He moved to Tennessee in the late 1780s or early 1790s, settling in the Mero District, which comprised Davidson, Sumner and Tennessee Counties. He served as treasurer of the district from 1794 to 1796, and was then Attorney General for the district from 1796 to 1797. He was appointed to the state supreme court in 1797, resigning the following year. He was a topographical engineer in the War of 1812.

Tatum was interred with full military honors on September 9, 1822.

Political offices
Preceded by William C. C. Claiborne	Justice of the Tennessee Supreme Court; 1797–1798	Succeeded by Andrew Jackson
