= A. D. Bright =

American judge (1838–1898)

Aaron Davidson Bright Jr. (August 10, 1838 – September 11, 1898) was a justice of the Tennessee Supreme Court in 1894.

== Early life ==
Aaron Davidson Bright Jr. was born on August 10, 1838, in Hinds County, Mississippi, to Mary G. (née Williams) and Aaron Davidson Bright. His father was from Currituck County, North Carolina, and his maternal ancestors were from Haywood County, Tennessee. His father died in 1840. Bright moved to Brownsville at the age of three and was raised there by his mother. Bright attended Emory & Henry College in Virginia and then East Tennessee University until 1860.

== Career ==
On May 24, 1861, Bright joined with the Confederate States Army at Corinth, Mississippi, enlisting as a private in the 18th Mississippi Infantry Regiment. After one year, he joined the cavalry with the rank of captain. He was a member of Forrest's Cavalry Corps, serving on the staff of James R. Chalmers as provost marshal.

After the war, Bright worked as a lawyer in Brownsville. In May 1883, he was appointed to the Referee Court in Jackson, where he served two years. In February 1894, he served as special judge on the Tennessee Supreme Court following the illness of Judge Benjamin J. Lea. When Lea died the following month, Governor Peter Turney appointed Bright as associate justice. Bright chose not to run for election to the seat later that year. He served until September 1, 1894, after which he resumed practicing law. He was a Democrat.

Later in life, Bright worked in chancery court and railroad business. He was a contributor to Goodspeed's History of Tennessee.

Bright was a member of the Hiram S. Bradford Bivouac chapter of the United Confederate Veterans. He was also a member of the Ancient Order of United Workmen.

== Personal life ==
Bright married and had two daughters (Mary and Mrs. James Tipton) and two sons (Prentiss, and A. D. Jr.) He was a member of the Methodist Church. He was friends with David A. Nunn.

Bright died on September 11, 1898, at age 60, at his home in Brownsville. He was buried in Oakwood Cemetery.

== Legacy ==
A memorial window was installed at the Brownsville Methodist Church in his memory.

Political offices
| Preceded by Benjamin J. Lea | Justice of the Tennessee Supreme Court; 1894–1894 | Succeeded by William Dwight Beard |
