= Judge Humphrey =

Judge Humphrey may refer to:

- Alexander Pope Humphrey (1848–1928), judge of the chancery court of Louisville, Kentucky
- Augustin Reed Humphrey (1859–1937), judge of the probate court of Broken Bow, Nebraska
- Herman L. Humphrey (1830–1902), judge of the Wisconsin 8th judicial circuit
- J. Otis Humphrey (1850–1918), judge of the United States District Court for the Southern District of Illinois

== See also ==
- Judge Humphreys (disambiguation)
