= Judge Humphreys =

Judge Humphreys may refer to:

- Richard Humphreys (judge) (fl. 1980s–2020s), judge of the High Court of Ireland
- Travers Humphreys (1867–1956), judge of the King's Bench Division of England
- West Hughes Humphreys (1806–1882), judge of the United States District Court for the Eastern District of Tennessee

== See also ==
- Judge Humphrey (disambiguation)
- Justice Humphreys (disambiguation)
