= Thomas J. Freeman =

American judge (1827–1891)

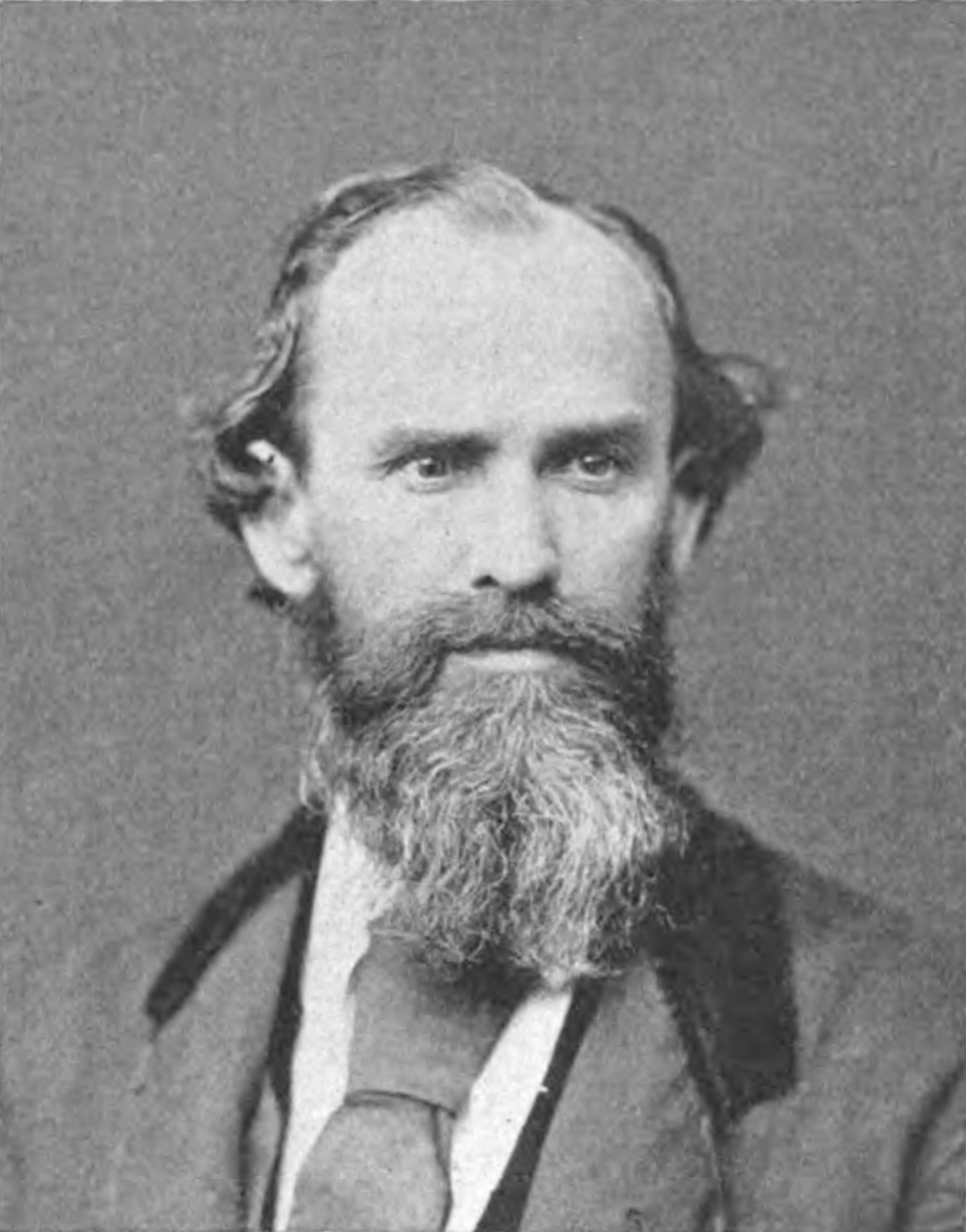
Thomas J. Freeman

Thomas J. Freeman (July 19, 1827 – September 16, 1891) was a Tennessee lawyer and Civil War soldier who served as a justice of the Tennessee Supreme Court from 1870 to 1886, and as the first law school dean for the University of Tennessee.

== Early life and career ==
Thomas J. Freeman was born on July 19, 1827, in Gibson County, Tennessee, where he attended the local schools. He never attended college. Freeman first studied medicine, but later changed his mind and entered the legal profession. At age twenty-one, he was admitted to the bar and established a law practice in Trenton, Tennessee. When the Civil War broke out, Freeman joined the Confederate Army; he became the colonel of the 22nd Tennessee Infantry Regiment. He was wounded at the Battle of Shiloh and became temporarily disabled. After his recovery he returned to the battlefield, serving under General Nathan Bedford Forrest. At the end of the war, Freeman moved to Brownsville, Tennessee, where he resumed practicing law and quickly became one of West Tennessee's most prominent attorneys.

== Tennessee Supreme Court ==
Freeman was first elected to the Tennessee Supreme Court in 1870. A strict constructionist, his influence on the court's majority was significant, although his uncompromising views did not always carry the day. According to attorney John W. Green, he "was noted for the stubbornness with which he maintained his views, and the number of his dissenting opinions". In Naff v. Crawford (1870), Freeman wrote on behalf of the court that contracts involving Confederate notes were not void. Rejecting the Radical Republican argument that such money was illegal because its use furthered treason, he maintained that the mere fact that a contract involved Confederate money (which during the Civil War was the only accessible currency in the South) did not, in and of itself, make it contrary to public policy. Freeman narrowly won renomination in 1878: Howell Edmunds Jackson, who later served on the U.S. Supreme Court, ran against him, winning just over forty-nine percent of the delegates at the Democratic convention. In the 1886 election, a general dissatisfaction with the large case backlog at the Tennessee Supreme Court led voters to oust three of its incumbents, including Freeman.

== Later life and death ==
Freeman served as the inaugural dean of the Law Department of the University of Tennessee following its establishment in 1889. In early 1891, due to failing health, he moved to the home of his son in Dallas, Texas, where he died later that year at the age of 64.

Political offices
Preceded by Newly constituted postwar court	Justice of the Tennessee Supreme Court; 1870–1886	Succeeded by Newly constituted post-Reconstruction court
