= Thomas Lanier Williams I =

American judge (1788–1856)

- Painted by Lloyd Branson
- Born: February 1, 1786; Surry County, North Carolina
- Died: December 2, 1856 (aged 70); Nashville, Tennessee
- Occupations: Lawyer, chancery judge, Tennessee Supreme Court judge, state senator

Thomas Lanier Williams I (February 1, 1786 – December 2, 1856) was an American lawyer who served as a justice of the Tennessee Supreme Court from 1825 to 1826. Williams represented Knox County in the Tennessee State Senate for three terms.

== Early life, education, and military service ==
Williams was born in Surry County, North Carolina. His parents were Rebeckah Lanier and Joseph Williams, who had several sons, four of whom came to Tennessee. Joseph Williams was a pioneer explorer of a Tennessee and a soldier of the revolution (along with his brothers-in-law, Robert Lanier and Joseph Winston), and was commissioned a colonel in the Continental Army.

Thomas L. Williams was a twin, five minutes younger than Lewis Williams, who stayed in North Carolina and was elected to Congress from that state. John Williams was one of their older brothers. Thomas L. Williams went to school at the University of North Carolina, graduating in 1808. He served in the East Tennessee Volunteers, his brother's regiment of Tennessee militia during the War of 1812.

== Judicial service and later life ==
He was appointed and accepted the appointment of judge of the Tennessee Supreme Court in November 1824. He represented Knox County in the Tennessee State Senate from 1819 to 1825. He worked as a lawyer in private practice throughout his career, predominantly in Knox County and adjoining jurisdiction. On May 16, 1825, while serving on the Supreme Court, Williams organized the chancery court for the district covering Carter, Greene, Washington, Cocke, Jefferson, and Sevier counties. The state legislature reduced the number of judges in 1826 and thus Williams' tenure on the bench ended.

Williams served as Chancellor for the Eastern District of Tennessee for nearly a third of his life. According to the Standard History of Knoxville, this entailed presiding "in 19 counties, holding 38 courts each year, and being absent from home 40 weeks of the 52. To all of these courts Judge Williams rode on horseback, there being then no railroads in Tennessee until the fifties, and this riding was over rough roads, in summer and in winter, in all kinds of weather, and he endured hardships which few men now, or even then, could have endured." Under this system, "Chancery Court was held once a year in each county, as the chancellor's division embraced so much territory; so by the agreement of the participants in a lawsuit a great many cases were heard by the Clerk and Master's report of the case to the judge, thus facilitating to a large extent the work of the court."

== Personal life and death ==
He married Polly Lawson McClung, a daughter of Knoxville pioneer Charles McClung, on August 5, 1811. They had seven children, five daughters survived to adulthood. They lived on Locust Street in Knoxville.

Williams died while visiting his sister Frances Lanier Williams and her husband, John Patton Erwin, in Nashville, Tennessee. He is buried in Nashville City Cemetery.

Political offices
Preceded by William Little Brown	Justice of the Tennessee Supreme Court; 1825–1826	Succeeded by Seat eliminated
