= William R. Harris =

American judge (1803–1858)

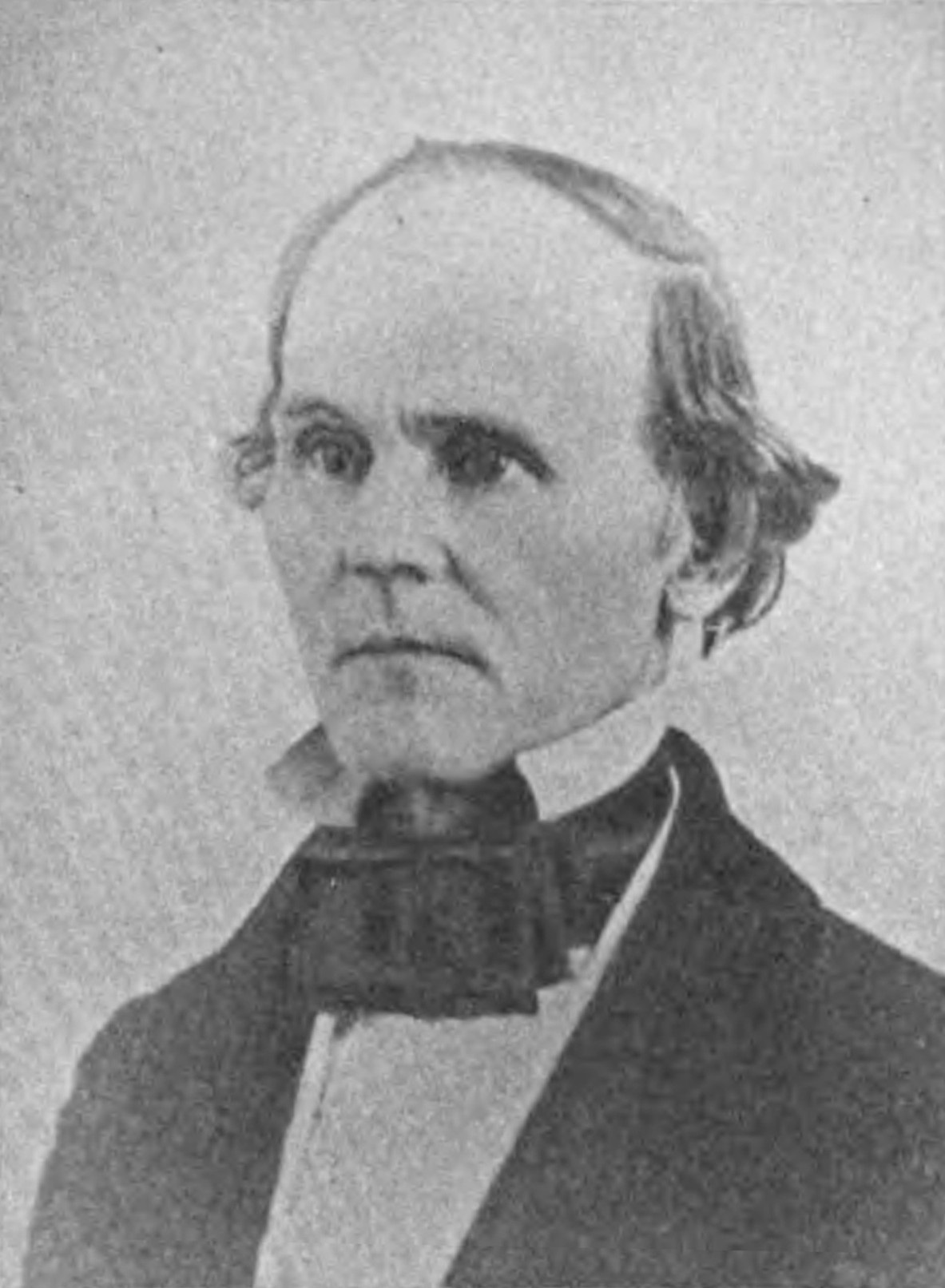
William R. Harris

William Rowland Harris (September 26, 1803 – June 19, 1858) was a justice of the Tennessee Supreme Court from 1855 to 1858.

== Early life, education, and career ==
Born in Montgomery County, North Carolina, Harris was brought with his family to Tennessee when his father moved near the Duck River in Bedford County, Tennessee, thereafter moving to Franklin County. His father was poor, and Harris had to work to help maintain the family. He was educated at the Carrick Academy in Winchester in the intervals between the making of crops. After he came of age and was appointed a deputy-sheriff of Franklin County, he studied at night, and kept up with his class in Carrick Academy. In 1825 he began to read law under Isaac Cook at Lawrenceburg, gaining admission to practice in 1827. He opened an office in Paris, Henry County, Tennessee. Harris was one of the founders of a community there, and where he "rapidly acquired an extensive and lucrative practice".

== Judicial service ==
In December 1836, at the age of 33, Harris was appointed by Governor Newton Cannon to a seat on the Tennessee Ninth Circuit court vacated by the resignation of Judge John W. Cook. Harris was afterward elected to the position by the Legislature, and served until 1845. He then resumed private practice, moving to Memphis in 1851. Following the death of Judge William B. Turley, he was appointed to that seat on the Common Law and Chancery Court, and was afterward elected to that office.serving from 1851 to 1855.

In August 1855, Governor Andrew Johnson appointed Harris to a seat on the state supreme court vacated by the resignation of Archibald W. O. Totten. Harris was elected to the seat on December 1, 1855, for the full constitutional term, but his service was cut short by his death.

== Personal life ==
Harris had four brothers and four sisters. His older brother, George W. D. Harris, became a Methodist minister. His youngest brother, Isham G. Harris, was Governor of Tennessee during the American Civil War, and thereafter represented his State for several terms in the United States Senate.

Harris was killed by the explosion of the boilers of the Mississippi River steamboat Pennsylvania, bound from New Orleans to Memphis. Upon his death, the duty of appointing his successor fell to his brother, Isham G., who was Governor at that time.

Political offices
Preceded by Archibald W. O. Totten	Justice of the Tennessee Supreme Court; 1855–1858	Succeeded by Archibald Wright
