= Pride Tomlinson =

American judge (1890–1967)

Pride Tomlinson (July 16, 1890 – November 27, 1967) was a justice of the Tennessee Supreme Court from 1947 to 1961.

Born in Culleoka, Maury County, Tennessee, Tomlinson received his undergraduate degree from the University of the South at Sewanee, followed by a law degree from the George Washington University. After gaining admission to the bar in 1920, he served as Maury County attorney from 1921 to 1947.

Tomlinson served as chairman of the Tennessee Code Commission from 1945 to February 1947, and was a special judge of the Tennessee Supreme Court from January to March 1946. On February 1, 1947, Governor Jim Nance McCord appointed Tomlinson to a seat on the court vacated by the death of Grafton Green. Tomlinson was subsequently elected for the remainder of that term in 1948, and to full terms in 1950 and 1958. Tomlinson served as president Judicial Conference from 1950 to 1951, and retired from the court on July 31, 1961.

Tomlinson died at Maury County Hospital at the age of 77, following a brief illness.

Political offices
Preceded by Grafton Green	Justice of the Tennessee Supreme Court; 1947–1961	Succeeded by Weldon B. White
