= William C. Folkes =

American judge (1845–1890)

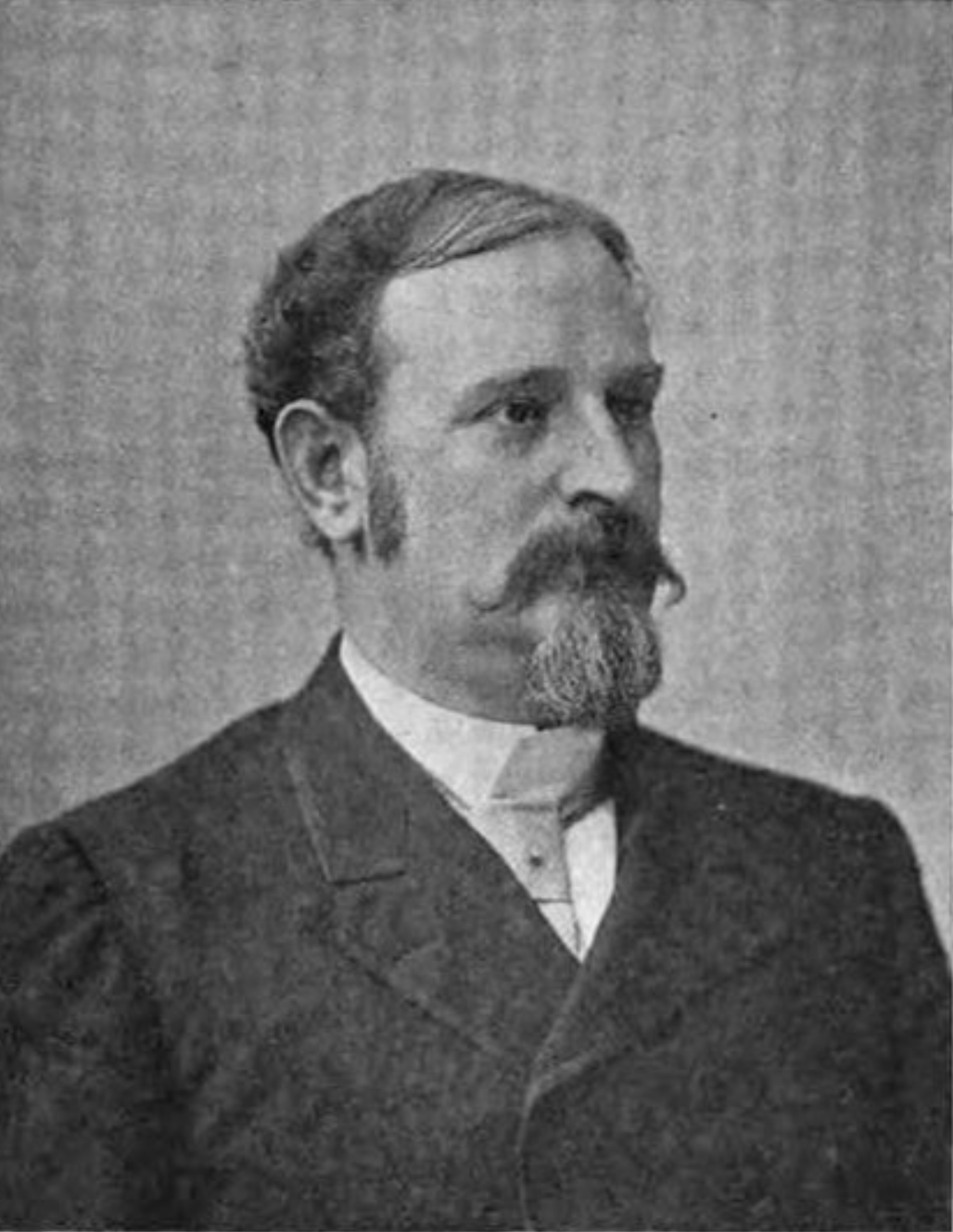
Tennessee Supreme Court Justice William C. Folkes.

William C. Folkes (June 8, 1845 – May 15, 1890) was a justice of the Tennessee Supreme Court from 1886 until his death in 1890.

== Early life, education, and military service ==
Born in Lynchburg, Virginia, to parents of English descent, he was sixteen years old and a school-boy when the American Civil War broke out. He quickly enlisted in the Confederate States Army, joining Moorman's Battery, enrolled at Lynchburg, and took part in the First Battle of Bull Run. He was severely wounded in that engagement. After his recovery, he rejoined the army. He lost a leg in the bloody charge at the Battle of Malvern Hill. Notwithstanding this disability, he continued in active service until the close of the war.

After the war, he again took up his collegiate studies at the University of North Carolina at Chapel Hill, graduating in a short while. He then entered the law department of the University of Virginia, receiving his degree in 1866.

== Legal and judicial career ==
In 1866, Folkes moved to Memphis, Tennessee, to practice law, and "soon commanded a large practice". He partnered with Judge Archibald Wright in the firm of Wright & Folkes, and continued to practice until 1886, when the Memphis Bar presented his name as a candidate for the state supreme court, to which he was then elected.

On the court, he wrote many opinions in the areas of corporate law and of commercial paper. He had a reputation for being dedicated to his work, as the loss of his leg during the war impeded him from engaging in more physical activities.

== Personal life and death ==
Shortly after moving to Memphis, Folkes married Mary Wright, daughter of Judge Archibald Wright.

Folkes died at his apartment in the Gayoso Hotel in Memphis, Tennessee, at the age of 46, following an illness of several weeks.

Political offices
| Preceded by Newly constituted court | Justice of the Tennessee Supreme Court; 1886–1890 | Succeeded by William Dwight Beard |
