= Chester C. Chattin =

American judge (1907–1979)

Chester C. Chattin (November 2, 1907 – July 29, 1979) was a justice of the Tennessee Supreme Court from 1965 to 1974.

Born in Winchester, Tennessee, Chattin received a B.S. from the University of the South in 1929, and an LL.B. from Cumberland University in 1930. He commenced the practice of law in Winchester that year, and served as an assistant district attorney for the General Eighteenth Judicial Circuit in 1935, 1937, and from 1939 to 1947. From 1940 to 1944, he represented Franklin County, Tennessee, in the Tennessee House of Representatives. He then served for a time as district attorney for the General Eighteenth Judicial Circuit.

On February 19, 1962, Governor Buford Ellington appointed Chattin to the Tennessee Court of Appeals. On December 28, 1964, Governor Frank G. Clement appointed to a seat on the Supreme Court of Tennessee vacated by the retirement of Justice Sam L. Felts. Chattin took office on January 1, 1965. Chattin was elected to a full term on the court in 1966. He remained on the court until his retirement in 1974, when several other justices also retired and the court was substantially replaced.

Chattin died at Franklin County Hospital following a stroke, at the age of 71.

Political offices
Preceded by Sam L. Felts	Justice of the Tennessee Supreme Court; 1965–1974	Succeeded by Court substantially renewed
