= Bennett Douglas Bell =

American judge (1852–1934)

Bennett Douglas Bell (July 4, 1852 – August 12, 1934) was a justice of the Tennessee Supreme Court from 1908 to 1910.

Born in Sumner County, Tennessee, Bell "received his B.A. and LL.B. degrees from Emory and Henry College in Virginia and Cumberland University and for many years was a prominent member of the Tennessee Bar serving as Attorney General [of Tennessee] and on the bench of the Supreme Court". Bell was a circuit judge on the Tennessee Tenth Circuit court from 1902 to 1908. On February 7, 1908, Bell was appointed to a seat on the Tennessee Supreme Court vacated by the death of Justice John S. Wilkes. Bell was elected in August 1908 for the remainder of the term, but was defeated for reelection in a 1910 election that broadly reconstituted the court.

Bell died at his home in Gallatin, Tennessee, at the age of 82.

Political offices
Preceded by John Summerfield Wilkes	Justice of the Tennessee Supreme Court; 1908–1910	Succeeded by Court reconstituted
