= Weldon B. White =

American judge (1907–1967)

Weldon B. White (July 22, 1907 – April 23, 1967) was a justice of the Tennessee Supreme Court from 1961 to 1967.

Born in Waxahachie, Texas, White graduated from Hume-Fogg High School in Nashville, Tennessee, and represented Davidson County, Tennessee, in the Tennessee Senate from 1942 to 1947. He also served as a major in the United States Army during World War II, and received his LL.B. at Cumberland University in 1944. He was a professor of law at Cumberland from 1946 to 1950.

On August 1, 1961, Governor Buford Ellington appointed White to a seat on the state supreme court vacated by the retirement of Pride Tomlinson. White was reelected to the remainder of his appointed term in 1962, and elected to a full eight-year term in 1966, but died the following year, at Vanderbilt University Hospital at the age of 59. He was interred at Nashville's Mount Olivet Cemetery. White was survived by his wife, Ellen Wallace White, and two children.

Political offices
Preceded by Pride Tomlinson	Justice of the Tennessee Supreme Court; 1961–1967	Succeeded by Allison B. Humphreys
