= Archibald W. O. Totten =

American judge (1809–1867)

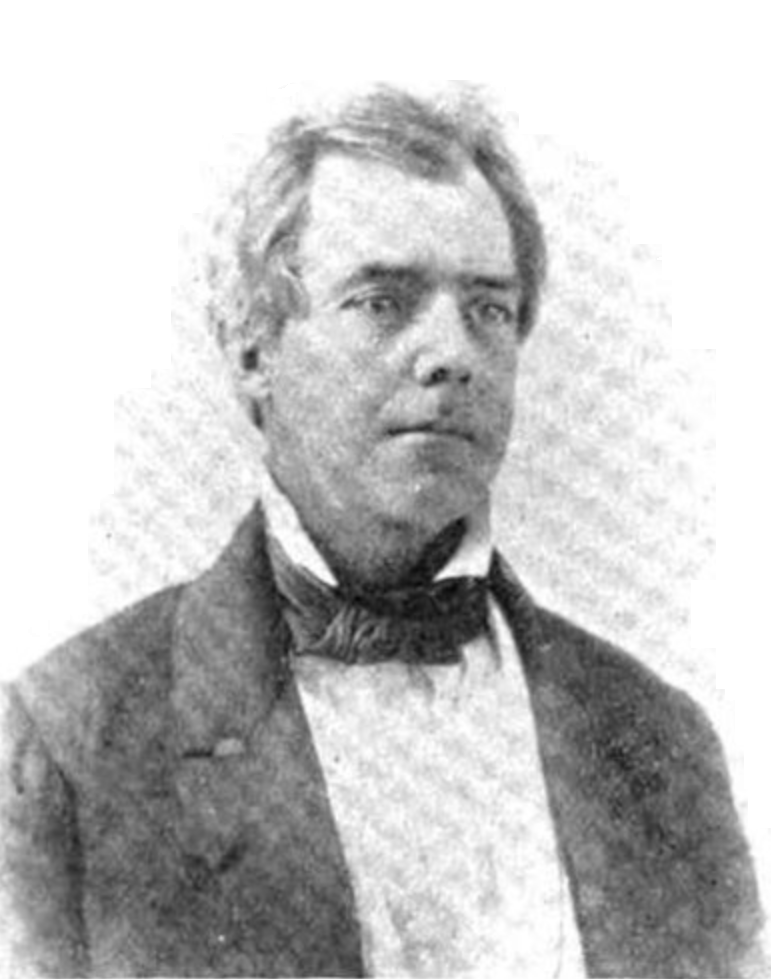
Archibald W. O. Totten

Archibald W. O. Totten (November 25, 1809 – 1867) was a justice of the Tennessee Supreme Court from 1850 to 1855.

Born in Overton County, Tennessee, his family moved to Gibson County in the west of the state when Totten was young. Totten studied law to gain admission to the bar, and commenced the practice of law at the county-seat, Trenton, Tennessee. After building a successful practice in Trenton, he moved to Jackson, Tennessee, as that was where the Federal Courts for the Western Division of the State met. When William B. Turley resigned from the Tennessee Supreme Court in 1850, Totten was appointed to the seat, and on February 28, 1850, was elected to continue serving. On May 25, 1854, Totten became a member of first group of Tennessee Supreme Court justices to be elected by popular vote. As a justice, Totten was "not a man of preeminent ability, but he filled the measure of judicial duty", being described as "deliberate in the formation of his opinions, diligent in research, attached to established precedent, and could not be swayed from his conscientious convictions". He remained on the bench until his resignation on July 17, 1855.

Totten was a member of the Peace Conference of 1861, held in Washington, D.C.

Totten died in 1867.

Political offices
Preceded by William B. Turley	Justice of the Tennessee Supreme Court; 1850–1855	Succeeded by William R. Harris
