= Henry G. Smith =

American judge (1807–1878)

Henry Grattan Smith (June 23, 1807 – December 31, 1878) was a justice of the Tennessee Supreme Court from 1867 to 1870.

Born in Hartford, Connecticut, on June 23, 1807, Smith was the son of Moses Smith Jr. and his wife Phoebe L. Adams. He attended Trinity College in Hartford, graduating in 1828. Smith then worked as a private tutor in Maryland before serving as a tutor at the University of North Carolina from 1830 to 1832. He studied law and began to practice in Somerville, Tennessee, before moving to Memphis, Tennessee in about 1842. He became a professor of commercial law at the new University of Memphis in 1846. The university closed after its building was destroyed by fire in 1849, and Smith resumed his private practice.

Smith was one of the judges serving on the highly partisan "apocryphal" court, which was in place in Tennessee between the end of the American Civil War and the enactment of the Constitution of 1870. The justices who served on this court "without exception, were bitter partisans" who "had all been Union men, and... took the partisan view of all questions growing out of the war". Of this group, Smith is described as one of several "of mediocre ability, who could not by possibility have reached a position of such importance in ordinary times", though he was also later eulogized as one of the "most talented citizens" of the state. Smith served as a Republican member of the Tennessee Senate for Shelby County from 1877 until his death the following year.

Smith died at his home in Memphis on New Year's Eve, having just returned home from a citizen's mass meeting. He was reported as having "returned to his home apparently in good health, but on entering his room fell dead on the floor, without speaking". Smith left an estate of about $50,000, a small fortune at the time, which his will primarily divided between Smith's widow, his brother George, and his sister Caroline.

Political offices
Preceded by Newly constituted court	Justice of the Tennessee Supreme Court; 1867–1870	Succeeded by Court reconstituted
