= David W. DeHaven =

American judge (1872–1943)

David William DeHaven
- DeHaven in 1936

Justice of the Tennessee Supreme Court
- In office January 21, 1935 – June 4, 1943
- Appointed by: Governor Hill McAlister
- Preceded by: William H. Swiggart
- Succeeded by: Frank H. Gailor

Personal details
- Born: October 26, 1872 Oxford, Mississippi, U.S.
- Died: June 4, 1943 (aged 70) Memphis, Tennessee, U.S.
- Spouse: Anna H. Hays (m. 1905)
- Education: Kemper Military School & College
- Profession: Lawyer, judge

David William DeHaven (sometimes spelled De Haven or Dehaven, October 26, 1872 – June 4, 1943) was an American lawyer and judge who served as a justice of the Tennessee Supreme Court from 1935 to until his death in 1943.

== Early life, education, and career ==
Born in Oxford, Mississippi, DeHaven's family moved to Memphis, Tennessee, when he was about 7 years old. He received his early education in public schools and then attended Kemper College, graduating in 1891, at the age of twenty. He turned down an offer from a congressman uncle to attend West Point after DeHaven was persuaded by his mother that "the peacetime life of an army officer isn't very exciting". He later attended the University of Missouri for two years before turning to the study of law.

DeHaven read law in the office of his uncle, Judge Bedford M. Estes of Memphis, gaining admission to the bar in the early 1890s, also having studied under Congressman John Cosgrove in Missouri. DeHaven thereafter entered the practice of law in Memphis, and was active in Democratic Party politics, serving as a delegate to the convention that nominated Robert Love Taylor for governor.

== Chancellorship and judicial service ==
In January 1923, DeHaven was selected to serve for a brief period as a "special chancellor" to substitute for an ailing judge, and then in May 1925, DeHaven was appointed to a fulltime position as chancellor in Memphis, a position he held for nearly a decade thereafter. Of approximately 300 opinions appealed from his court during his chancellorship, only five were reversed.

On January 21, 1935, Governor Hill McAlister appointed DeHaven to a seat on the Tennessee Supreme Court vacated by the resignation of Justice William H. Swiggart, who had left to become general counsel of the Nashville, Chattanooga and St. Louis Railway. DeHaven was sworn in by the governor immediately upon his appointment, and began hearing cases with the court that same day.

In May 1936, the State Democratic Committee nominated DeHaven "by acclamation to succeed himself in that office", and then ran unopposed in the general election to fill the remainder of Swiggart's term. DeHaven was re-elected to an eight-year term in 1942, but died a year into that term.

== Personal life ==
In 1900, DeHaven married Anna H. Hays of Bunceton, Missouri, who survived him. They had no children.

He was a member of St. Luke's Episcopal Church in Memphis, where he also taught a Bible class for young people.

DeHaven died in Memphis at the age of 70, one month after undergoing abdominal surgery. He was interred at Elmwood Cemetery in Memphis.

Political offices
Preceded by William H. Swiggart	Justice of the Tennessee Supreme Court; 1935–1943	Succeeded by Frank H. Gailor
