= A. B. Neil =

American judge (1873–1966)

A. B. Neil, by Cornelius Hankins ca. 1940

Albert Bramlett Neil (February 28, 1873 – June 26, 1966) was an associate justice of the Tennessee Supreme Court from 1942 to 1947, and then chief justice of the Court until 1960.

== Life ==
Neil was born in Lewisburg, Tennessee on February 28, 1873, the son of Dr. James Benton Neil and his wife Talitha Jane McCord. He attended Winchester Normal College, Terrell College in Decherd, Tennessee and then Cumberland University. He graduated from the Cumberland School of Law with an LL.B. degree in 1896.

In 1898, Neil was elected to the 51st Tennessee General Assembly representing Marshall County in the House from 1899 to 1901 as a Democrat. In 1902, he moved to Nashville, Tennessee. On September 11, 1911, Neil married Josephine Pendleton in Nashville.

Neil was a criminal court judge for Davidson County from 1910 to 1918 and a circuit court judge for Davidson County from 1918 to 1942. He also served as a professor at the Cumberland University Law School from 1930 to 1940 and as dean of the law school from 1935 to 1940. Neil was conferred an honorary LL.D. degree by Cumberland University in 1935.

Neil was appointed to the Tennessee Supreme Court on March 9, 1942, to a seat vacated by the death of Associate Justice William L. Cook. He was elected chief justice on October 6, 1947 after the death of Alexander W. Chambliss.

Neil retired from the Court on February 1, 1960. He died in Nashville on June 26, 1966, at the age of 93. Neil was interred at Woodlawn Memorial Park in Nashville.

Political offices
Preceded by William Loch Cook	Justice of the Tennessee Supreme Court; 1942–1960	Succeeded by Sam L. Felts
