= Larry Creson =

American athlete and judge (1906–1972)

- Born: January 17, 1906; Memphis, Tennessee
- Died: June 19, 1972 (aged 66)
- Other name: Kitty
- Occupation: Judge
- Football career

No. 20
- Position: End

Personal information
- Listed height: 6 ft 0 in (1.83 m)
- Listed weight: 173 lb (78 kg)

Career information
- College: Vanderbilt (1927)

Awards and highlights
- All-Southern (1927)

Lawrence Barkley "Kitty" Creson (January 17, 1906 – June 19, 1972) was a college football and baseball player who later served as an associate justice of the Supreme Court of Tennessee.

== Vanderbilt University ==
He graduated with a LL B. from Vanderbilt University in 1928. At Vanderbilt, Creson was a member of the Sigma Alpha Epsilon fraternity.

=== Football ===
Creson was a prominent end for Dan McGugin's Vanderbilt Commodores of Vanderbilt University, a teammate and target of College Football Hall of Fame quarterback Bill Spears. Wallace Wade called Creson one of the best tackle blockers he ever saw. Creson often played next to inexperienced tackles, and was called upon to block the other team's tackle.

==== 1927 ====
He was selected All-Southern in 1927. Creson was noted as an exemplary product of former end and assistant coach Hek Wakefield.

=== Baseball ===
He also was a pitcher on the baseball team.

== Judge ==
Creson was appointed Associate Justice of the Supreme Court of Tennessee by Governor Frank G. Clement on August 1, 1965, following the death of Justice Andrew O. Holmes. He served in that capacity until his death, in 1972.
