= Alexander W. Chambliss =

American judge (1864–1947)

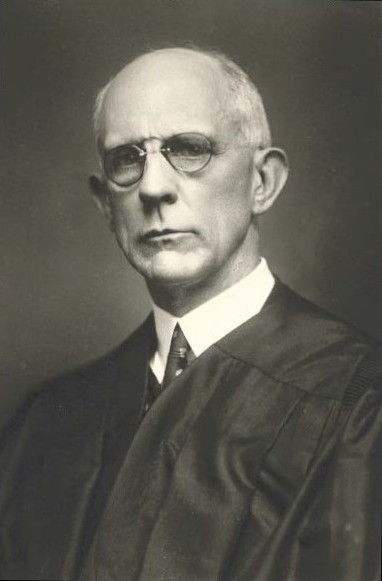

Chief Justice of the Tennessee Supreme Court
- In office February 3, 1947 – September 30, 1947
- Preceded by: Grafton Green
- Succeeded by: A. B. Neil

Associate Justice of the Tennessee Supreme Court
- In office October 18, 1923 – February 2, 1947
- Preceded by: Nathan L. Bachman
- Succeeded by: Hamilton S. Burnett

Mayor of Chattanooga
- In office October 14, 1901 – October 16, 1905
- Preceded by: Joseph Wassman
- Succeeded by: William L. Frierson
- In office July 14, 1919 – October 17, 1923
- Preceded by: Jesse M. Littleton
- Succeeded by: Richard Hardy

Tennessee State Senator for Hamilton County
- In office 1899–1900
- Preceded by: Halbert B. Case
- Succeeded by: J. Walter Peak

Personal details
- Born: September 10, 1864 Greenville, South Carolina, U.S.
- Died: September 30, 1947 (aged 83) Jacksonville, Florida, U.S.
- Resting place: Forest Hills Cemetery; Chattanooga, Tennessee, U.S.
- Party: Democratic Party
- Spouse(s): Lillian Carter Nelson (m. 1886, died) Agnes Shalliday (m. 1933)
- Children: 2
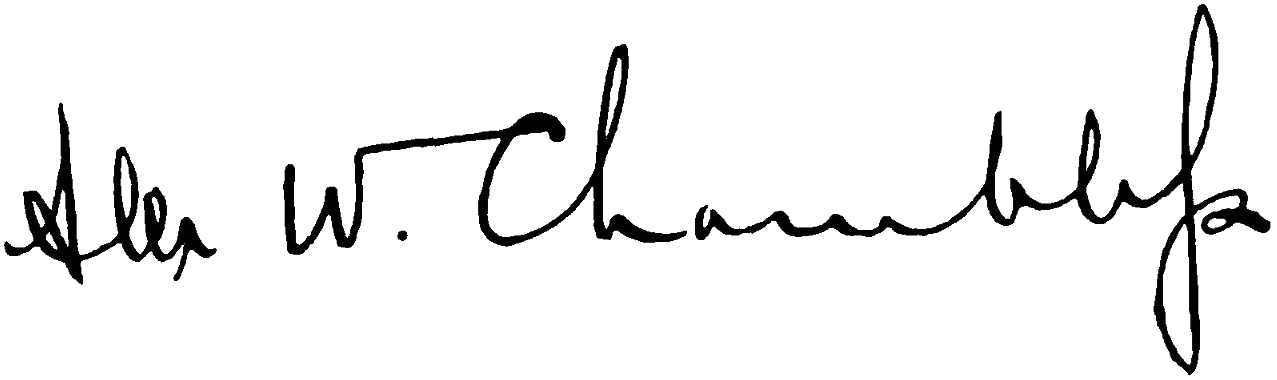
- Signature
- Nickname: Alex

Alexander Wilds Chambliss (September 10, 1864 – September 30, 1947) was the mayor of Chattanooga, Tennessee, from 1901 to 1905 and again from 1919 to 1923, when he became an associate justice of the Tennessee Supreme Court. In 1947, Chambliss served eight months as chief justice of that Court.

== Early life and education ==
Chambliss was born in Greenville, South Carolina, on September 10, 1864, the son of John Alexander Chambliss and his wife Mary Mauldin. His father was a Baptist minister who served as a chaplain in Robert E. Lee's Confederate Army of Northern Virginia. Alexander Chambliss received his early education in Charleston, South Carolina, and then attended Kenmore University High School near Amherst, Virginia. He began to study law under Augustine T. Smythe in Charleston and completed his legal training under William H. F. Payne in Warrenton, Virginia.

== Career ==
Chambliss briefly practiced law in Warrenton before moving to Brownsville, Tennessee. He practiced law there until 1886 and also edited the Brownsville Democrat. Chambliss then set up a law practice in Chattanooga.

In 1898, Chambliss was elected as a Democrat to the 51st Tennessee General Assembly succeeding Republican Halbert B. Case as the state senator representing Hamilton County. In 1900, Democrat J. Walter Peak was elected to succeed him.

In 1901, Chambliss became mayor of Chattanooga. In 1903, he was re-elected for a second two-year term. In 1904, Chambliss contributed a section about Chattanooga to an article on the economic progress of cities in the southeastern United States.

Chambliss continued his independent law practice until 1911, when he joined a Chattanooga law firm. From 1917 to 1918, he served as a special judge on the Tennessee Court of Civil Appeals.

In 1919, Chambliss again became mayor of Chattanooga. In 1923, he was re-elected for a second four-year term. He only served until October of that year, having been appointed as an associate justice of the Tennessee Supreme Court on September 22 to replace Nathan L. Bachman. Chambliss wrote the sole dissenting opinion when the Court upheld the state law on which the 1925 Scopes trial was based.

In 1946, he gave $30,000 to build the Alexander W. Chambliss Home in Chattanooga. Judge Chambliss was also a Freemason.

On February 3, 1947, Chambliss was elected chief justice of the Tennessee Supreme Court after the death of Grafton Green. Later that same year, he was injured in an automobile accident near Chattanooga on August 1. Chambliss went to Florida to recuperate and died in Jacksonville on September 30. In October, Hamilton S. Burnett was appointed to succeed him on the Court and Associate Justice A. B. Neil was elected to succeed him as chief justice.

== Personal ==
Chambliss married Lillian Carter Nelson in Brownsville on April 26, 1886. They had a son and a daughter. Their daughter married Samuel E. Whitaker.

After his first wife's death, Chambliss married Agnes Shalliday in Nantucket, Massachusetts, on July 29, 1933.
