= Nathan Green Sr. =

American judge (1792–1866)

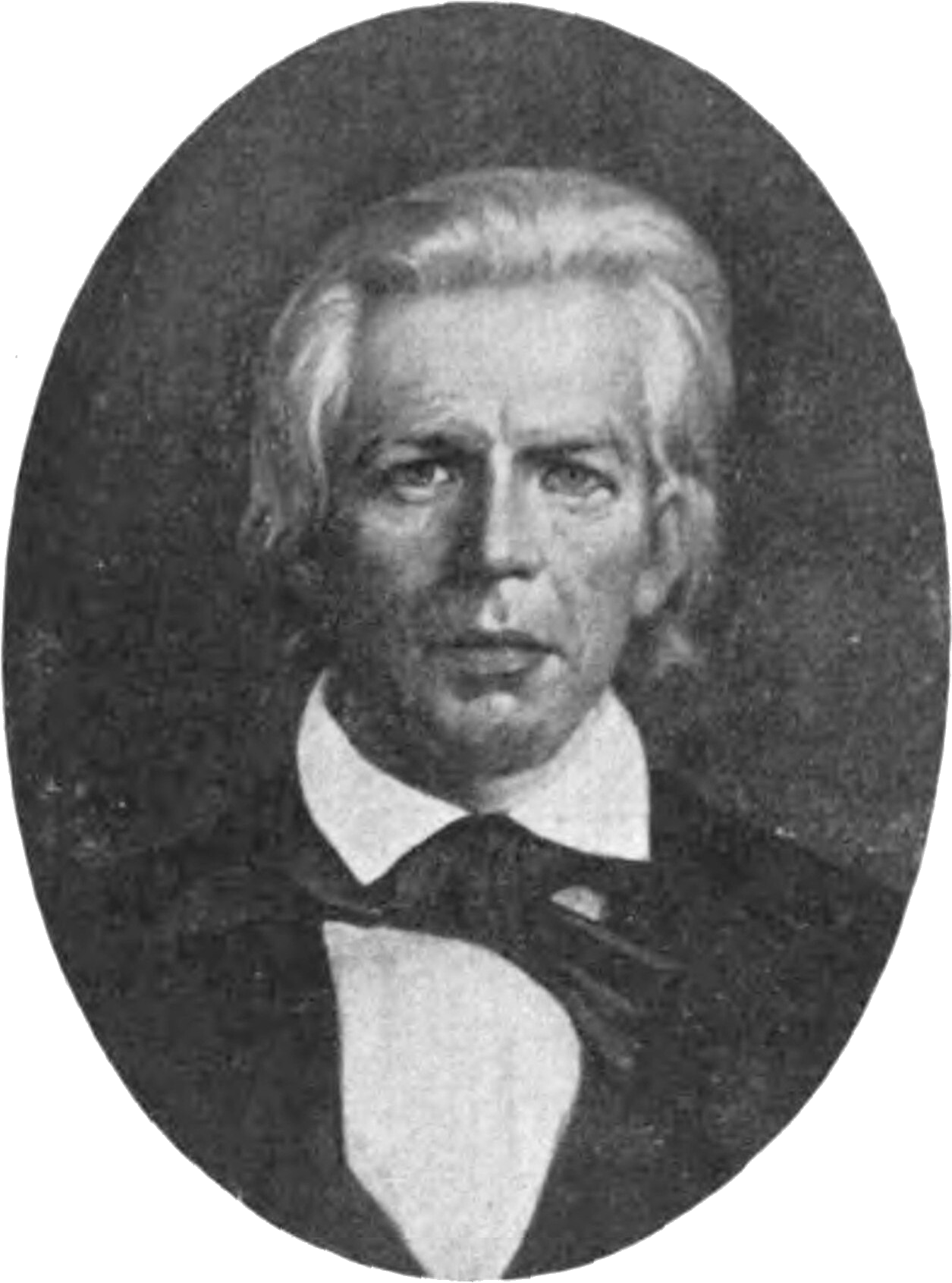

Associate Justice of the Tennessee Supreme Court
- In office 1831 – September 27, 1852
- Preceded by: John Catron
- Succeeded by: Robert L. Caruthers

Member of the Tennessee Senate
- In office 1827

Personal details
- Born: May 16, 1792 Amelia County, Virginia, U.S.
- Died: March 30, 1866 (aged 73) Lebanon, Tennessee, U.S.
- Children: Thomas Green; Nathan Green Jr.
- Relatives: Grafton Green (grandson)
- Occupation: Judge, politician

Military service
- Allegiance: United States
- Battles/wars: War of 1812

Nathan Green Sr. (May 16, 1792 – March 30, 1866) was a justice of the Tennessee Supreme Court from 1831 to 1852.

Born in Amelia County, Virginia, Green served as a soldier in the War of 1812, and as a member of the Tennessee Senate in 1827, also serving as chancellor of East Tennessee from 1827 to 1831.

On December 19, 1831, following the elevation of John Catron to the office of chief justice of the state supreme court, Green was elected by the state legislature to the vacant seat; one of five candidates for the spot, Green was elected on the fifth ballot. On December 4, 1835, Green defeated Catron in a bid for a seat on the newly constituted court under the Constitution of 1834. Green retired on September 27, 1852.

Green later served as the principal instructor in the law department of Cumberland University.

He died at his home in Lebanon, Tennessee, at the age of 73. His eldest son, Thomas Green, became a soldier. Another son, Nathan Green Jr., also became a prominent attorney and legal educator, and his grandson, Grafton Green, also served on the Tennessee Supreme Court.

Political offices
Preceded by John Catron	Justice of the Tennessee Supreme Court; 1831–1852	Succeeded by Robert L. Caruthers
