= Tennessee Court of Errors and Appeals =

- Established: 1809
- Dissolved: 1833
- Jurisdiction: Tennessee, United States
- Location: Carthage, Clarksville, Jonesborough, Knoxville, Nashville, and Rogersville
- Authorized by: Tennessee General Assembly, Acts of 1809 Chapter 48 Section 23
- Number of positions: Initially two and a Circuit Judge, then from 1811 three judges.

The Tennessee Court of Errors and Appeals was established by the Tennessee legislature in 1809 as the Supreme Court of Errors and Appeals. Though Tennessee's original constitution did not call for a Supreme Court, at the Constitutional Convention of 1834 the Tennessee Supreme Court was created as its own entity, replacing the Court of Errors and Appeals.

Section 23 of the Acts of 1809, Chapter 48 called for the court to have two judges, elected by both houses of the General Assembly, and one Circuit judge. The Supreme Court of Errors and Appeals heard writs of error from the Circuit Courts. Section 25 required that a circuit judge from designated districts would sit on cases from other circuits.

The Acts of 1811 Chapter 72 Section 4 gave exclusive jurisdiction for equity cases to the Supreme Court of Errors and Appeals and divested equity jurisdiction from the Circuit Courts. Section 16 of the act removed a circuit judge as a member of the court and created a third judge for the court. The Supreme Court of Errors and Appeals first divided its equity docket as a result of Chapters XII and XIV of the Acts of 1822.

== See also ==
- Tennessee Supreme Court
