= Ross W. Dyer =

American judge (1911–1993)

Ross W. Dyer (March 10, 1911 – April 30, 1993) was a justice of the Tennessee Supreme Court from 1961 to 1974, serving as chief justice from 1969 to 1974.

Born in Lauderdale County, Tennessee, Dyer attended tḸhe University of Tennessee and Cumberland University, receiving his Juris Doctor from the Nashville YMCA Night Law School in 1937. Dyer served for three years in the U.S. Army Medical Corps in the European theater during World War II. Upon his return, he entered the private practice of law in Halls, Tennessee, and was an executive assistant to governor of Tennessee Buford Ellington from 1951 to 1961. Dyer was also a member of the state's Limited Constitutional Convention in 1953, and served in the Tennessee State Senate from 1957 to 1958.

On September 15, 1961, Governor Ellington appointed Dyer to a seat on the Tennessee Supreme Court vacated by the retirement of John E. Swepston. In one noted 1966 opinion, Dyer wrote reprimanding a trial judge who had refused to grant a beer license because beer was harmful. The reprimand noted that the trial judge had exceeded the power of the courts and invaded the purview of the legislature. Dyer served as chief justice from September 1, 1969, to September 1, 1974. The Democratic Party did not renominate Dyer for a third term on the court.

He thereafter returned to the private practice of law in Halls. Dyer died in Lauderdale County, following a lengthy illness, and was interred in Halls Cemetery. Dyer was survived by his wife, Agnes Moss Dyer, and his son, Tom Dyer, a Memphis attorney. His grandson, also named Ross W. Dyer, also became a Tennessee state court judge.

Political offices
Preceded by John E. Swepston	Justice of the Tennessee Supreme Court; 1961–1974	Succeeded by Court substantially renewed
