= Nathan Green Jr. =

American lawyer

Nathan Green Jr. (February 1827 – February 1919) was one of the founders and the first dean of Cumberland School of Law, then located in Lebanon, Tennessee.

== Early life ==
Nathan Green Jr. was born in February 1827. He was the son of judge Nathan Green Sr., who was elected to the Tennessee Supreme Court in 1831 and served for 20 years, until 1852. His brothers were doctors and lawyers; his eldest brother was the Confederate general Tom Green, for whom Tom Green County, Texas was named.

== Career ==
Green taught the Law for 63 years. He was instrumental in keeping the Cumberland School of Law alive through the American Civil War and during the Reconstruction period, although his adherence to legal formalism and the devastation wrought by the Civil war are, perhaps, reasons why Cumberland did not follow the institutions of that time like Harvard or Yale. It is also noted that while Cumberland remained impoverished after the Civil War, Green did not. (p. 98-99)

== Death and legacy ==
Green died in February 1919, the day before his 92nd birthday, having continued teaching up until his death. His son, Grafton Green, became a judge. He was a justice of the Tennessee Supreme Court from 1910 to 1947, including more than 23 years as chief justice.
