= Andrew McClain =

American judge (1826–1913)

Andrew McClain (April 16, 1826 – January 21, 1913) was a justice of the Tennessee Supreme Court from 1869 to 1870.

Born in Smith County, Tennessee, McClain was appointed to the Tennessee Sixth Circuit Court on July 16, 1864, serving until his appointment to the state supreme court in 1869. McClain was one of the judges serving on the highly partisan "apocryphal" court, which was in place in Tennessee between the end of the American Civil War and the enactment of the Constitution of 1870. The justices who served on this court "without exception, were bitter partisans" who "had all been Union men, and... took the partisan view of all questions growing out of the war". Of this group, McClain is described as one of several "of mediocre ability, who could not by possibility have reached a position of such importance in ordinary times". McClain served for a year and a half. He was later appointed United States Attorney for the Middle District of Tennessee by President Chester A. Arthur.

After his service as U.S. Attorney, McClain moved to California, where he was a pioneer of San Diego. He died in Los Angeles at the age of 86.

Political offices
Preceded by Newly re-established court	Justice of the Tennessee Supreme Court; 1869–1870	Succeeded by Court reconstituted
