= James O. Shackleford =

American judge (1809–1883)

James O. Shackleford (1809 – March 13, 1883) was an American lawyer who served as a justice of the Tennessee Supreme Court from 1865 to 1868.

== Early life and career ==
Born in Kentucky, Shackleford moved with his parents to Missouri at an early age. In his early adulthood, he engaged in trapping in New Mexico and other parts of the Southwest. After returning, he attended Transylvania University in Lexington, Kentucky, and studied law and began practicing in Dover, Tennessee, in 1832. In 1838, he moved to Clarksville, Tennessee, and formed law partnerships, first with James Rivers, and later with Gustav A. Henry. Shackleford became a prominent attorney in that city remaining in practice there until the beginning of the American Civil War, during which Shackleford "espoused the Union cause, yet he always sympathized with the misfortunes of his neighbors on the other side, and through his influence prevented much suffering".

== Judicial service ==
On August 24, 1865, Reconstruction-era Governor Parson Brownlow appointed Shackleford and two other justices, Hawkins and Milligan, to a newly reconstituted state supreme court. Shackelford was the last of these three justices to be appointed. This version of the court came to be known as the 'apocryphal' court, of which it was noted that "many of its decisions have been overruled, and its opinions are infrequently referred to as authority".

The court was unstable during this time, with many short-serving justices. Shackelford himself resigned in February 1868, to become Chancellor of the Nashville division, in which position he served from February 28, 1868, to December 16, 1868. All of the judges having resigned, there were none remaining to hold a session in September 1868, so Brownlow reappointed Shackelford for an additional short period, along with Horace Maynard, a lawyer and a Radical member of Congress.

In 1869, Shackleford resumed the practice of law in Nashville, continuing until about 1875, when he moved to Colorado. He settled in Leadville, Colorado, where he spent the rest of his life.

== Death ==
Shackleford died in Leadville, Colorado from paralysis, with which he was stricken in 1880, and never recovered.

Political offices
Preceded by Newly reconstituted court	Justice of the Tennessee Supreme Court; 1865–1868	Succeeded by Horace Harrison
