= Allison B. Humphreys =

American judge (1906–1993)

Allison Battle Humphreys, Jr. (June 28, 1906 – September 1, 1993) was a justice of the Tennessee Supreme Court from 1967 to 1974.

Born in Lebanon, Wilson County, Tennessee, he was the third of six children of Allison Battle Humphreys (1876-1963) and Maude Dixon Sperry (1882-1954). Humphreys attended Castle Heights Military Academy, and received an LL.B. from Cumberland University in 1929, entering the practice of law that same year. He was an assistant district attorney general for the Fifth Judicial Circuit from 1937 to 1940, a circuit judge for that circuit from 1941 to 1942, and an assistant to the attorney general and court reporter from 1943 to 1952. Humphreys also served as acting dean and professor of law at the Cumberland School of Law from 1942 to 1945.

Humphreys was solicitor general of Tennessee from 1952 to 1960. In that capacity, Humphreys asserted in one high-profile case that it was illegal for an executive branch agency of the state to employ a state legislator. On January 22, 1960, Humphreys was appointed by Governor Buford Ellington to a seat on the Tennessee Court of Appeals. On April 27, 1967, Ellington elevated Humphreys to a seat on the Tennessee Supreme Court vacated by the death of Justice W. G. White. Humphreys was elected to a full term in 1968, defeating his challenger, Domestic Relations Judge Benton Trimble, by a vote of 200,852 to 111,387. Humphreys served until his retirement from the court in 1974.

In 1984, Humphreys sat as a special justice to hear cases challenging state taxes on flea markets and computer software. Humphreys wrote the opinion on the software tax, which was upheld.

Humphreys died at University Medical Center in Lebanon, Tennessee.

Political offices
Preceded by Weldon B. White	Justice of the Tennessee Supreme Court; 1967–1974	Succeeded by Court substantially renewed
