= John Haywood (judge) =

American judge

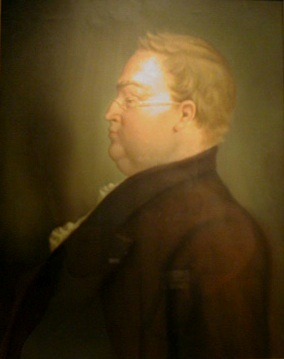
Portrait of Haywood by Lloyd Branson

John Haywood (1762–1826) was an American jurist and historian known as "the Father of Tennessee History."

== Biography ==
Haywood was born in Halifax County, North Carolina on March 16, 1762, the son of Egbert Haywood, a Patriot officer during the American Revolutionary War. Despite limited educational opportunities on the colonial frontier, Haywood taught himself law and in later life became widely read. Admitted to the bar in 1786, he quickly gained a reputation as one of the best legal minds in the state.

Haywood was appointed as the North Carolina Attorney General from 1791 to 1794. In 1794, Haywood was appointed to the bench of the Superior Court of North Carolina, but resigned in 1800 to defend a longtime friend, North Carolina Secretary of State James Glasgow, who, along with several other prominent citizens, had been charged with land warrant fraud. This scandal proved so unpopular that Haywood's own reputation was injured in defending Glasgow.

Following the trial in which Glasgow was convicted, Haywood moved to Raleigh and returned to private law practice. At this time he began his career as an important legal scholar.

His North Carolina Reports (1806) and A Manual of the Laws of North Carolina (1808) were the first important compilations of the state's statutes. He produced equally important legal texts for Tennessee, including A Revisal of All the Public Acts of the State of North Carolina and of the State of Tennessee (1809), Duty and Authority of Justices of the Peace (1810), and The Statute Laws of the State of Tennessee (1831), the latter completed after his death by Robert L. Cobbs.

Haywood owned land in Middle Tennessee. At the encouragement of his friend John Overton, he moved his family to Davidson County. He built a home called Tusculum some eight miles south of Nashville and soon added two log offices. There he trained young men for the law in what may have been the first "law school" in the Old Southwest. As in his native state, Haywood quickly established an enviable legal reputation. In 1816 he was appointed to the Tennessee Supreme Court of Errors and Appeals, a position he held until his death in 1826.

Though he weighed over 350 pounds in his later life, Haywood was an active and energetic man. He researched and wrote on religion and history in addition to his legal work. His The Christian Advocate (1819), a slender eccentric religious study, was his first non-legal work. He is best known for his histories of Tennessee, including The Natural and Aboriginal History of Tennessee (1823), an attempt to prove that the native tribes of Tennessee were descendants of ancient Hebrews (a popular idea among European Americans in the early 19th century); and The Civil and Political History of the State of Tennessee (1823), a comprehensive history from prehistoric times to statehood in 1796. The Civil and Political History became an influential source for future Tennessee historians, especially J. G. M. Ramsey.

Haywood's histories established him as the pioneer in Tennessee historiography. In researching his histories, Haywood examined early colonial and state records and interviewed many of the pioneers or their descendants. Though later criticized for inaccuracies, the books were groundbreaking works in preserving and interpreting the state's history. An outgrowth of Haywood's research was the formation of the state's first historical society, the Tennessee Antiquarian Society, in 1820; Haywood served as president but it ceased operating after two years. Haywood was also elected a member of the American Antiquarian Society in 1820.

Haywood and his wife, the former Martha Edwards, had ten children together. Haywood died on December 22, 1826, and was buried on Christmas Eve at his home. Tennessee's Haywood County, created in 1823, is named for him.

== See also ==
- List of defunct law schools in the United States
- Samuel Cole Williams

== Notes ==
Legal offices
Preceded by Alfred Moore	Attorney General of North Carolina; 1792–1795	Succeeded by Blake Baker

Political offices
Preceded by Alvin Hawkins	Justice of the Tennessee Supreme Court; 1816–1826	Succeeded by Henry Crabb
