= Archibald Wright (judge) =

American judge (1809–1884)

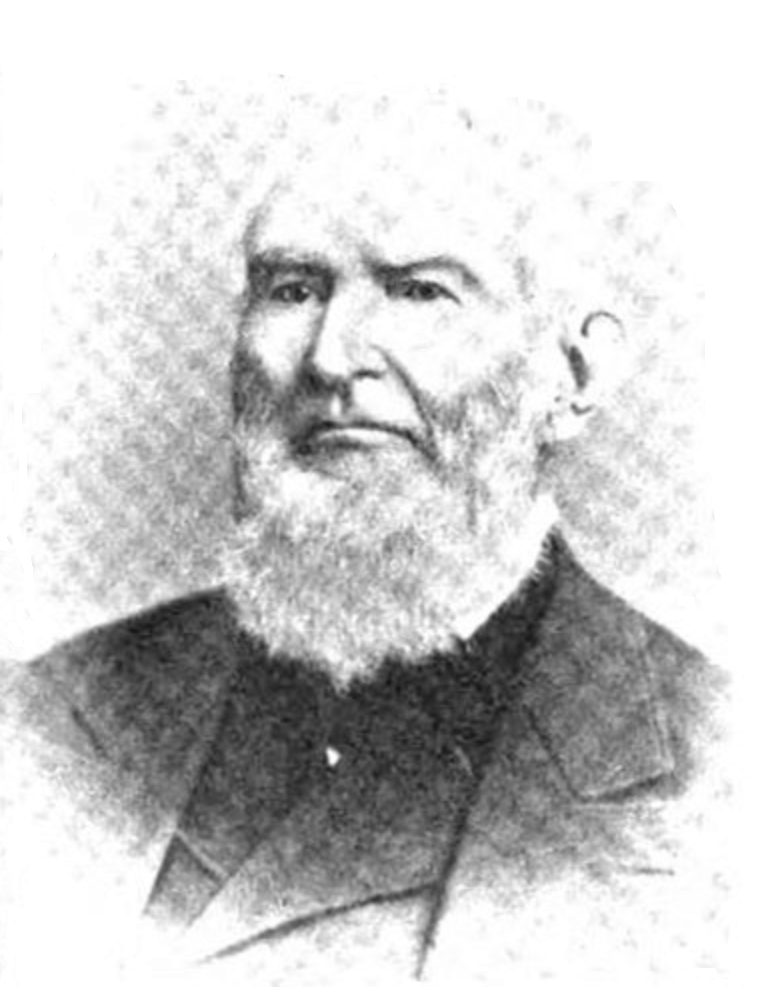
Archibald Wright

Archibald Wright (November 29, 1809 – September 13, 1884) was a Tennessee lawyer who served as a justice of the Tennessee Supreme Court from 1858 to 1862.

== Early life, education, military service, and career ==
Born in Maury County, Tennessee, to very poor parents of Scottish ancestry, shortly after his birth his family moved to the adjoining Giles County. He attended Mount Pleasant Academy and Giles College, where he studied diligently, and then sought out Judge Bramblette in Pulaski to study law. Bramblette was initially skeptical, but accepted Wright as a student, and Wright gained admission to the bar in 1832, opening a law office in Pulaski, Tennessee.

Wright enlisted to fight in the Second Seminole War, and served for the duration of the war, thereafter returning to practice law in Pulaski. He was elected to represent Giles County in the Tennessee State Legislature in 1847, remaining in Pulaski until 1851, when his growing success in legal practice prompted him to move to Memphis, Tennessee. There, he formed a partnership with Thomas J. Turley.

== Judicial service and later life ==
Although Wright reportedly "did not solicit the position", on June 19, 1858, Governor Isham G. Harris appointed Wright to a seat on the state supreme court vacated by the death of Justice William R. Harris. In August, 1858, he was elected to a full term. One account contrasted his practice as a judge, and as lawyer afterward:

His opinions as a judge were utterly without ostentation. He indulged in no elaborate discussion to display his learning or his reasoning power. He stated the controlling principle clearly and concisely, amplifying it only enough to show that in it was to be found the essence of justice. No man was more thoroughly familiar with the cases than he. He could almost recite the Tennessee Reports; but he disdained to make use of citations to authorities to any great extent. He sought for reasons, not precedents. His opinions had the unusual quality of ordinarily convincing the losing lawyer of his error. He had another quality in keeping with his nature. The opening sentence generally announced the decision of the case. He never indulged in the artifices used by judges to keep a lawyer in suspense as to the disposition of the case until he reaches the concluding sentence of the opinion.

As Judge Greer said to him, he used a rifle as a judge, but the shot-gun was his weapon as an advocate. In a very important case which had been on trial for several weeks before an able Federal judge, he filed brief after brief on the questions arising in the progress of the cause, until the number reached nine. One morning the judge, seeing a new brief prepared for filing, asked Judge Wright how it was that a judge whose opinions were models of terseness, should as a practitioner use such voluminous and numerous briefs. "Sir," he replied, "when I was a judge I had the power to say what the law was, and I said it as succinctly as possible; but in the trial of my causes I find it essential to be prepared on all points, because I don't know what a fool judge may decide".

Wright did not serve out his elected supreme court term due to the American Civil War. Wright "ardently espoused the cause of the Confederacy". His only two sons enlisted in the Confederate Army, and Wright, too old for active service himself, followed the army so as to remain close to his sons. One of them died in the Battle of Murfreesboro, but the other survived the war.

At the end of the war he found himself largely in debt because of obligations incurred in extensive purchases of plantations and slaves in Louisiana before the war. His property was dissipated by the war, but the debts remained. He declined to take advantage of a Louisiana law excusing payment of obligations incurred in the purchase of slaves, or of bankruptcy law. After briefly serving on a commission established to enforce a state lien on railways, he "labored incessantly at his profession until within a few weeks of his death", at the age of seventy-four. It was said that "he loosened the hold on life, as a giant oak in green old age rushes to its fall".

Late in life, Wright continued to live in Memphis. He died in Ravenden Springs, Arkansas, on September 13, 1884. Wright was interred at Elmwood Cemetery in Memphis two days later.

Political offices
Preceded by William R. Harris	Justice of the Tennessee Supreme Court; 1858–1862	Succeeded by Court reconstituted after American Civil War
