= Frank Drowota =

American judge (1938–2018)

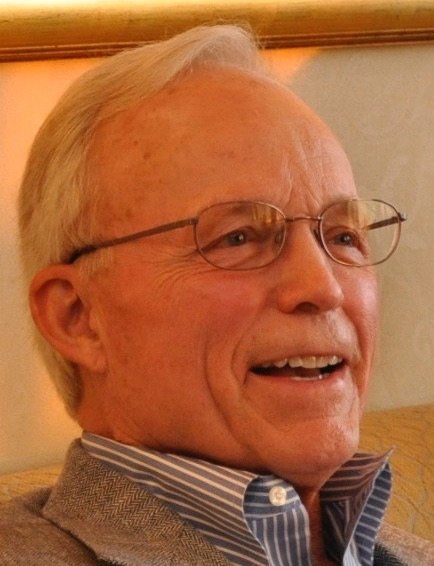
- Drowota in 2010

Justice of the Tennessee Supreme Court
- In office 1980–2005
- Preceded by: Joe W. Henry

Personal details
- Born: Frank F. Drowota III; July 7, 1938 Williamsburg, Kentucky, U.S.
- Died: April 15, 2018 (aged 79) Nashville, Tennessee, U.S.
- Education: Montgomery Bell Academy; Vanderbilt University (BA); Vanderbilt University Law School (JD)
- Occupation: Judge

Military service
- Allegiance: United States
- Branch/service: United States Navy
- Years of service: 1960–1962

Frank F. Drowota III (July 7, 1938 – April 15, 2018) was a former chief justice of the Tennessee Supreme Court.

Drowota was born in Williamsburg, Kentucky, but moved with his family to Nashville, Tennessee, as a small boy. He attended Montgomery Bell Academy, graduating in 1956. He matriculated at Vanderbilt University that year, graduating in 1960 with a Bachelor of Arts in history and political science. Drowota served on active duty in the United States Navy from 1960 to 1962. He then attended the Vanderbilt University Law School, and was awarded the Juris Doctor degree in 1965. He served in the United States Naval Reserve as a Judge Advocate General's Corps officer.

Drowota practiced law with Goodpasture, Carpenter, Woods & Sasser in Nashville until 1970, when he was elected chancellor of the Davidson County Chancery Court. From this position he was elevated to the Tennessee Court of Appeals in 1974. In 1980, Drowota was elected to an unexpired term on the Tennessee Supreme Court to the seat of former justice Joe Henry, who had died of a heart attack.

Drowota defeated George Brown, the court's first African-American member, who had been appointed to the position by the then-Governor of Tennessee Lamar Alexander, but Brown's appointment had not been confirmed by the voters. Drowota won the election and was subsequently re-elected to full eight-year terms in 1982, 1990, and 1998, the last time under provisions of the Tennessee Plan. During his tenure on the Supreme Court, he was elected by his peers to two terms as chief justice.

In 2006, the Tennessee Bar Association honored Drowota by establishing "The Justice Frank F. Drowota III Outstanding Judicial Service Award". The award is presented annually by the organization to a Tennessee judge who has demonstrated outstanding and dedicated service to the bench and bar, with Justice Drowota as its first recipient. The same year Drowota retired, he chaired the Tennessee Bar Association's committee working to ensure fair and ethical campaigns. He developed a code of conduct to govern judicial campaigns and personally contacted each judge and judicial candidate in Tennessee to encourage them to abide by the code.

He served as a trustee of the Frist Foundation, Montgomery Bell Academy and the Nashville School of Law, and in 2007 he became chair-elect of the YMCA of Middle Tennessee. Drowota died in Nashville on April 15, 2018, at the age of 79.

== Sources ==
- Tennessee Blue Book, 1991–94 and 2005-06 editions
