= Grafton Green =

American judge

Grafton Green

Grafton Green (August 25, 1872 – January 27, 1947) was an American jurist who served on the Tennessee Supreme Court from 1910 to 1947, including over 23 years as chief justice.

Green was born in Lebanon, Tennessee, on August 25, 1872, the son of Nathan Green Jr., who taught law for 63 years at Cumberland School of Law of Cumberland University and served as the law school's chancellor. His paternal grandfather, Nathan Green Sr., had been a judge on the Tennessee Supreme Court for 20 years.

After completing an A.B. degree at Cumberland University in 1891, Green earned an LL.B from Cumberland School of Law in 1893, being called to the bar that same year. He operated a law practice in Nashville until 1910, when he was elected as a Tennessee Supreme Court associate justice. He was subsequently re-elected in 1918, 1926, 1934, and 1942. Green became the chief justice of Tennessee in 1923, serving until his death in Nashville on January 27, 1947. As of 2011, he is the person who served the longest on Tennessee's highest court.

In 1927, Green presided over the appeal of John T. Scopes, who had been convicted of teaching evolution. The court found the law against the teaching of evolution constitutional, but overturned Scopes' conviction on a technicality. Five years later, Green also presided over Evans v. McCabe, 52 S.W. 2d 159 (1932), which held that the state constitution prohibits personal income taxes on wages, but not on interest-bearing investments.

A bust of Green is displayed in the Tennessee Supreme Court Building in Nashville.

Political offices
Preceded by Newly constituted court	Justice of the Tennessee Supreme Court; 1910–1947	Succeeded by Pride Tomlinson
