= Colin P. McKinney =

American judge (1873–1944)

Colin P. McKinney

Colin Pierson McKinney (May 23, 1873 – April 29, 1944) was a justice of the Tennessee Supreme Court from 1918 to 1942.

Born in Ripley, Tennessee to Dr. Colin Shepherd McKinney and Adelaide Frances Pierson, McKinney attended the public schools and Brennan Military Academy. Intending to become a court reporter, he read law with his uncle, Judge Blair Pierson, and admitted to the Tennessee bar in 1896. He became a chancellor of the Ninth Division of Tennessee in 1910, and after eight years in that office was elected to the newly reconstituted state supreme court.

McKinney retired from the bench in 1942, due to ill health, and died in Nashville two years later, at the age of 70.
