= National Register of Historic Places listings in Haywood County, Tennessee =

Location of Haywood County in Tennessee

This is a list of the National Register of Historic Places listings in Haywood County, Tennessee.

This is intended to be a complete list of the properties and districts on the National Register of Historic Places in Haywood County, Tennessee, United States. Latitude and longitude coordinates are provided for many National Register properties and districts; these locations may be seen together in a map.

There are 17 properties and districts listed on the National Register in the county. One property was once listed, but has since been removed.

Contents: Counties in Tennessee
Anderson – Bedford – Benton – Bledsoe – Blount – Bradley – Campbell – Cannon – Carroll – Carter – Cheatham – Chester – Claiborne – Clay – Cocke – Coffee – Crockett – Cumberland – Davidson – Decatur – DeKalb – Dickson – Dyer – Fayette – Fentress – Franklin – Gibson – Giles – Grainger – Greene – Grundy – Hamblen – Hamilton – Hancock – Hardeman – Hardin – Hawkins – Haywood – Henderson – Henry – Hickman – Houston – Humphreys – Jackson – Jefferson – Johnson – Knox – Lake – Lauderdale – Lawrence – Lewis – Lincoln – Loudon – Macon – Madison – Marion – Marshall – Maury – McMinn – McNairy – Meigs – Monroe – Montgomery – Moore – Morgan – Obion – Overton – Perry – Pickett – Polk – Putnam – Rhea – Roane – Robertson – Rutherford – Scott – Sequatchie – Sevier – Shelby – Smith – Stewart – Sullivan – Sumner – Tipton – Trousdale – Unicoi – Union – Van Buren – Warren – Washington – Wayne – Weakley – White – Williamson – Wilson

This National Park Service list is complete through NPS recent listings posted August 21, 2026.

== Current listings ==
	Name on the Register	Image	Date listed	Location	City or town	Description
1	Brownsville Carnegie Library	Brownsville Carnegie Library	July 26, 2018 (#100002752)	121 W Main St. 35°35′38″N 89°15′49″W	Brownsville	
2	College Hill Historic District		September 11, 1980 (#80003834)	U.S. Routes 70/79 and State Route 19; also roughly bounded by Haralson, Margin & Cherry Sts., N. Wilson Ave. 35°35′36″N 89°16′12″W	Brownsville	Second set of addresses represents a boundary increase January 27, 2015
3	Dancyville United Methodist Church and Cemetery	Dancyville United Methodist Church and Cemetery	March 13, 1991 (#91000224)	85 Dancyville Methodist Church St. 35°24′19″N 89°17′43″W	Dancyville	
4	Dunbar-Carver Historic District		January 27, 2015 (#14001224)	Along E. Jefferson St. & roughly bounded by Anderson Ave., E. Main St. & RR tracks 35°35′31″N 89°15′09″W	Brownsville	
5	Esso Filling Station		March 14, 2024 (#100010103)	41 N. Washington Avenue; 35°35′41″N 89°15′44″W	Brownsville	
6	Haywood County Farm and Cemetery		May 28, 2025 (#100011910)	4110 U.S. Hwy 70 East; 35°35′29″N 89°11′18″W	Brownsville vicinity	
7	Joshua K. Hutchison House	Joshua K. Hutchison House	July 7, 1988 (#88001022)	124 N. Church Ave. 35°35′44″N 89°15′31″W	Brownsville	
8	Jefferson Street Historic District		March 28, 2016 (#14001225)	Roughly bounded by Margin & E. Main Sts., S. Jackson & Washington Aves. 35°35′34″N 89°15′42″W	Brownsville	
9	North Washington Historic District		January 27, 2015 (#14000448)	Roughly bounded by N. Wilson & N. Park Aves., Thomas & E. Main Sts. 35°35′44″N 89°15′37″W	Brownsville	
10	Republican Primitive Baptist Church		July 5, 2000 (#00000769)	350 Raymond Taylor Rd. 35°38′01″N 89°25′55″W	Brownsville	
11	Stanton Masonic Lodge and School	Stanton Masonic Lodge and School	October 22, 1987 (#87001878)	109 W. Main St. 35°27′56″N 89°24′17″W	Stanton	
12	Stanton School	Stanton School	March 27, 2020 (#100005144)	5 Lafayette St. 35°27′46″N 89°24′17″W	Stanton	
13	Temple Adas Israel	Temple Adas Israel	January 19, 1979 (#79002445)	Washington and College Sts. 35°35′44″N 89°15′45″W	Brownsville	
14	Woodland Baptist Church	Woodland Baptist Church	March 26, 2003 (#03000150)	885 Woodland Church Rd. 35°33′51″N 89°06′02″W	Woodland	
15	Woodlawn Baptist Church	Woodlawn Baptist Church	March 15, 2024 (#100010115)	Tibbs Rd. at TN-19; 35°41′53″N 89°24′36″W	Nutbush	
16	Woodlawn Baptist Church and Cemetery	Woodlawn Baptist Church and Cemetery	December 2, 1996 (#96001358)	Woodlawn Rd., east of State Route 19; 35°39′16″N 89°19′16″W	Nutbush	
17	Zion Church	Zion Church	November 21, 1978 (#78002601)	College and Washington Sts. 35°35′44″N 89°15′42″W	Brownsville	

== Former listings ==
	Name on the Register	Image	Date listed	Date removed	Location	City or town	Description
1	Cedar Grove		April 29, 1980 (#80003833)	July 25, 2018	West of Brownsville; 35°40′19″N 89°23′38″W	Brownsville	

== See also ==
- List of National Historic Landmarks in Tennessee
- National Register of Historic Places listings in Tennessee
