= William Tripp =

William Tripp may refer to:

- William Tripp (politician) (1817–1878), Maine and South Dakota politician, lawyer and surveyor
- William H. Tripp Jr (1920–1971), designer of the sailboat Invicta
- Jack Tripp (William John Charles Spencer Tripp, 1922–2005), British comedian and pantomime artist
- Billy Tripp (William Blevins Tripp, born 1955), Tennessee artist
