= William W. Bond =

American politician (1884–1975)

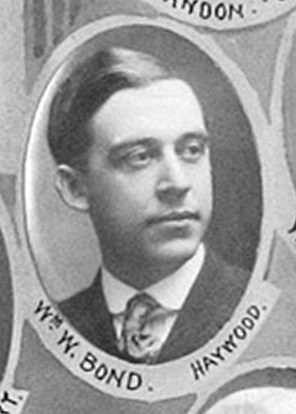
- Bond pictured in the 60th General Assembly composite photo

Member of the Tennessee House of Representatives from the Haywood district
- In office 1917–1921

Member of the Tennessee Senate from the 21st district
- In office 1921–1923

Speaker of the Tennessee Senate
- In office 1921–1923

Personal details
- Born: William West Bond; March 8, 1884 Brownsville, Tennessee
- Died: May 9, 1975 (aged 91) Brownsville, Tennessee
- Party: Democratic
- Spouse: Rosa Montedonico (1916–1975; his death)
- Occupation: Lawyer

William West Bond (March 8, 1884 – May 9, 1975) was an American lawyer and politician in the state of Tennessee. He served as the Speaker of the Tennessee Senate from 1921 to 1923.

== Biography ==
Bond was born in 1884 in Brownsville, Tennessee, to Judge John Rascoe and Jennie (née Taylor) Bond. He attended schools in Brownsville before attending Bethel College and Vanderbilt University, graduating from the latter in 1907 with a Bachelor of Arts degree. He taught school and studied law at the Cumberland School of Law before opening up a law practice in Haywood County in 1910. Bond was elected as a Democrat to the Tennessee House of Representatives in 1917 to represent Haywood County. He served in that capacity until 1921, when he was elected to the Tennessee Senate, this time representing Haywood and Fayette County (21st District). During his term in the senate, from 1921 to 1923, Bond was also selected to serve as speaker which he served until the completion of his term in 1923.

Bond married Rosa Montedonico of Italy on February 28, 1916. He had four children with her, Rosa, in 1918, William West, Jr. in 1919, Emanuel "Monte", in 1923 and Aurelia, in 1927. He was a member of the Phi Gamma Delta fraternity and was active in the freemasons organization. Bond died in May 1975 in Brownsville and he is interred in Oakwood Cemetery in that same city. His wife, Rosa died in 1982.
