= Alex Watkins =

American gridiron football player (born 1989)

No. 91
- Position: Defensive lineman

Personal information
- Born: July 17, 1989 (age 37); Temple, Texas, U.S.
- Listed height: 6 ft 4 in (1.93 m)
- Listed weight: 237 lb (108 kg)

Career information
- High school: Brownsville (TN) Haywood
- College: Alabama
- NFL draft: 2012: undrafted

Career history
- Tennessee Titans (2012)*; Calgary Stampeders (2013)*
- * Offseason or practice squad member only

Awards and highlights
- 2× BCS national champion (2010, 2012)

Alex Watkins (born July 17, 1989) is an American former football defensive lineman. He was a member of the Calgary Stampeders, Tennessee Titans and played college football at Alabama.

== Early life ==
Watkins played high school football at Haywood High School in Brownsville, Tennessee. He committed to play for Alabama as part of Nick Saban's first recruiting class as head coach of the Crimson Tide in January 2007.

College recruiting
Name	Hometown	School	Height	Weight	40^{‡}	Commit date
Alex Watkins; DE	Brownsville, Tennessee	Haywood High School	6 ft 5 in (1.96 m)	225 lb (102 kg)	4.7	Jun 18, 2006
Alex Watkins; DE	Recruit ratings: Scout: Rivals: (77)					
Overall recruit ranking: Scout: 63 (WDE)
‡ Refers to 40-yard dash; Note: In many cases, Scout, Rivals, 247Sports, On3, and ESPN may conflict in their listings of height, weight and 40 time.; In these cases, the average was taken. ESPN grades are on a 100-point scale.; Sources: "2007 Team Ranking". Rivals.com.

== College career ==
At Alabama, Watkins redshirted the 2007 season and did not see any playing time for the 2008 season during his redshirt freshman year. During the 2009 season, Watkins appeared in three games as part of the squad that won the 2009 Bowl Championship Series championship. Over his final two seasons with the Crimson Tide, Watkins played primarily as a reserve and on special teams in both the 2010 and 2011 seasons. During the 2011 campaign, Watkins broke his arm in their game against Tennessee. He returned to the field in their next game after their bye week and played against LSU with 23 staples and a plate in his left forearm.

=== College statistics ===
Year	GP–GS	Tackles				Sacks	Pass Defense				Fumbles		Blocked
Year	GP–GS	Solo	Ast	Total	Loss–Yards	No–Yards	Int–Yards	BU	PD	QBH	No–Yards	FF	Kick
2009	4–0	0	1	1	0–0	0–0	0–0	0	0	0	0–0	0	0
2010	12–0	9	7	16	2.5–22	2.5–22	0–0	0	0	2	0–0	0	0
2011	13–1	9	8	17	2–13	1–12	0–0	0	0	2	0–0	1	0
Total		18	16	34	4.5–35	3.5–34	0–0	0	0	4	0–0	1	0

== Professional career ==
In the days that followed the 2012 NFL draft, Watkins signed with the Tennessee Titans as an undrafted free agent in April 2012. Watkins remained with the Titans through much of training camp before he was waived on August 10, 2012, after he sustained an ankle injury during practice. On March 11, 2013, Watkins was signed by the CFL's Calgary Stampeders. Watkins as later released by the Stampeders.
