= Clay Evans =

Clay Evans may refer to:

- H. Clay Evans (1843–1921), American politician and businessman
- Clay Evans (One Tree Hill), a fictional character from the television series One Tree Hill
- Clay Evans (swimmer) (born 1953), Canadian Olympic swimmer
- Clay Evans (pastor) (1925–2019), influential 20th-century African-American pastor in Chicago and gospel recording artist
