= Stanton School =

- U.S. National Register of Historic Places
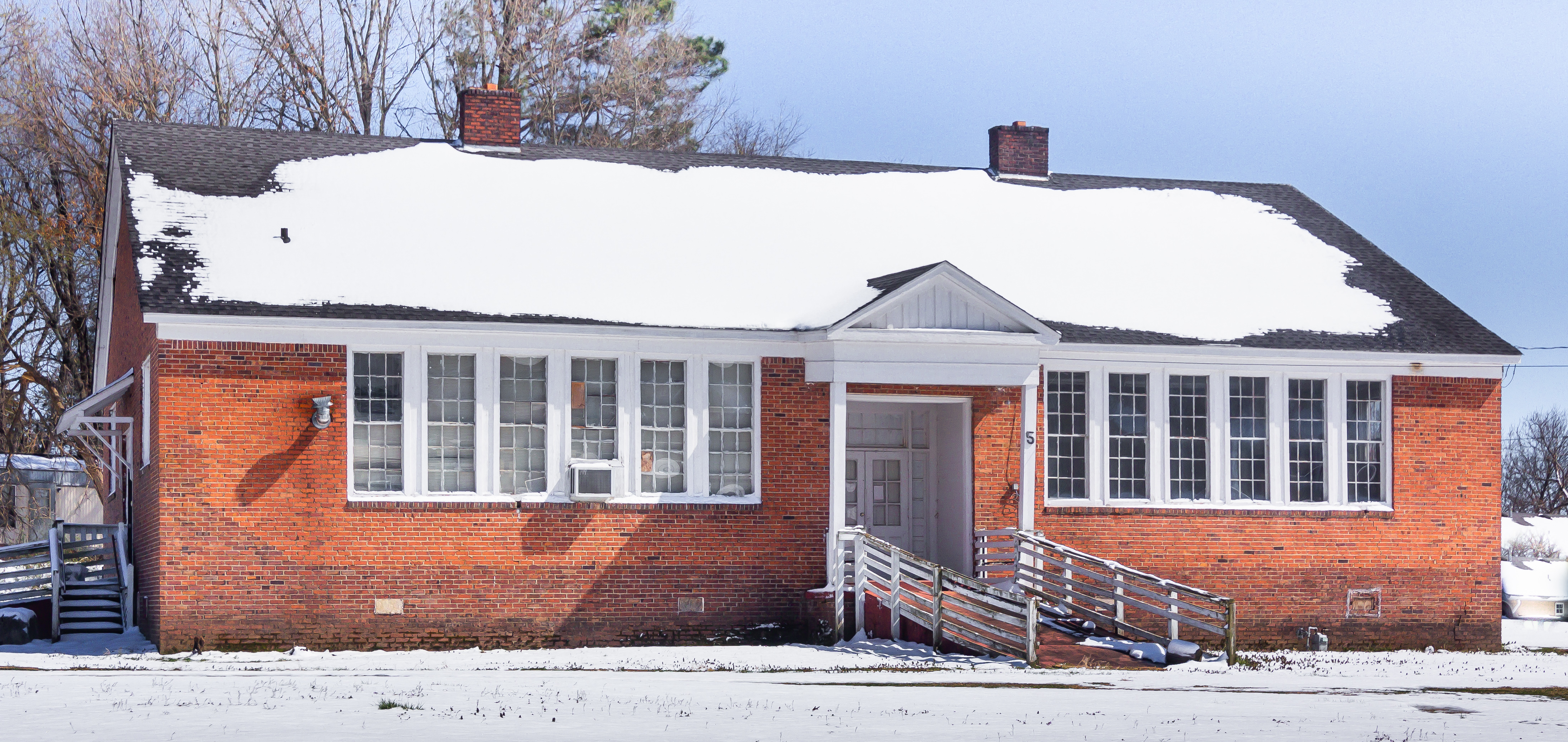

- Location within Tennessee
- Location: 5 Lafayette St., Stanton, Tennessee
- Coordinates: 35°27′46″N 89°24′17″W
- Built: 1948
- NRHP reference No.: 100005144
- Added to NRHP: March 27, 2020

The Stanton School, at 5 Lafayette St. in Stanton, Tennessee, was listed on the National Register of Historic Places in 2020.

It was built in 1948 and operated until 1969 as a school for African-American students.

== See also ==
- Stanton Masonic Lodge and School, on Main St., also National Register-listed
