= Belle Eagle, Tennessee =

Unincorporated community in Tennessee, US

Coordinates: 35°41′07″N 89°13′47″W

Belle Eagle is an unincorporated rural community in Northern Haywood County, Tennessee, United States. Belle Eagle is located seven miles north of Brownsville on Tennessee State Route 54. The Green, Herd, Lee, Lewis, Macon, Mullen, Parks, Taylor, Thornton, Walker, and Williams families were among the early settlers. Some of the land was developed as early as 1820. Much of the area remains in large family farms. The community's name has been attributed to a local gentry who decided upon Belle Eagle after seeing an eagle around its neck in a tree. It is possible this etymology is related to the belled buzzard of American folklore. Numerous supposed sightings of the creature had been made in Tennessee throughout the century, including a notable one in nearby Brownsville.

Businesses through the years included:

- Gristmill owned by Edgar Parks
- Blacksmith Shop operated by Joel Harrell, later by Tom Pruitt
- Barber Shop operated by Z. T. Norman
- Sawmill and Cotton Gin, co-owned by Mrs. Bessie Bradford Sorrelle and A. A. Mann
- General Store operated by Mr. Dedmon, later by Earl Mullen, then Mr. Boggs.
- New Store, built by Earl Mullen also had a laundromat and okra buying center

Nothing remains of the former business center aside from a beauty parlor and a small restaurant, both of which are out of operation. The Mullen store survived until June 1988 when it burned down.

Members of the original families still living in Belle Eagle in 2008 were Bishop, Jameson, Lee, Lewis, Mann, Macon, Roberts, Sorrelle, Sikes, Wiggington and White.

A volunteer fire department is housed in the old one-room Bradford school building which was closed when all schools were consolidated in Brownsville.
