= Haywood High School =

Location
- 1175 E College Street; Brownsville, Tennessee 38012; United States; 35.60063°N 89.24734°W

Information
- School type: Public
- Motto: The mission of Haywood High School is to assist all students in acquiring the knowledge, skills, and character necessary to be successful, reliable, productive citizens.
- School district: Haywood County Schools
- Principal: Michelle Tillman
- Teaching staff: 58.00 (FTE)
- Grades: 9-12
- Enrollment: 776 (2023-2024)
- Student to teacher ratio: 13.38
- Color
- Athletics: Basketball, Football, Soccer, Baseball, Softball, Tennis
- Mascot: Tomcat
- Information: 731-772-1845
- Website: https://haywoodschools.com/haywood-high-school/

Haywood High School is a public high school located in Brownsville, Tennessee, originally built for the purpose of educating white students only. It is now the sole public high school in Haywood County.

== History ==
Haywood County public schools were established as a dual system, having separate schools for black and white students. In response to the federal court case Brown v. Board of Education, a "freedom of choice" plan was adopted for the 1966 school year, but this did very little to integrate the schools (in fact, no white students attended any of the schools previously designated for blacks). In 1970, there were approximately 4,000 negro and 2,000 white students in the two systems. Another lawsuit, United States v. Haywood County Board of Education, filed in 1967, ruled the plan invalid. In defense of the choice plan, the Board of Education stated there had only been two Ku Klux Klan meetings in the county in recent years, and that no instance of bombing, arson, or cross-burning had been shown to be attributable to school desegregation. In particular, they commented that the same night a negro civil rights leader's house was bombed, a white persons was also bombed, and that the threatening anonymous letters and phone calls were "few and far between." They further argued that negative instances were brought on by two civil rights leaders, a white man and woman, were living, unmarried, in homes with Negroes, and that was the source of the violent reaction of Haywood County citizens. The court rejected these arguments and set forth a blueprint for integration of the schools by 1970.

In 1970, a new school was built for the purpose of integrating black students from Carver High School. Integration was overseen by then superintendent E.D. Thompson.

In the early 1990s, it was noted in news reports that the school had a racially motivated selection system for homecoming queen, requiring alternating winners who were white, then black. Haywood County is one of only 2 counties in Tennessee with a Black majority (Shelby).

In March 2012, principal Dorothy Bond faced scrutiny for reportedly telling homosexual students that they would go to hell, threatening them with 60-day suspensions for public displays of affection, and other verbal attacks on gay and pregnant students. As a result of the attention that this remark engendered, Bond resigned on March 1, 2012.

On December 4, 2017, students walked out of class to do a peaceful protest for alleged racial remarks on social media about "stringing up" black people made by members of the school's baseball team. In January 2018, the school got assigned to a new principal and assistant principal, Latonya Jackson and former football coach of Haywood High School, Steve Hookfin.

== Haywood High School 2023-2024 Statistics ==
Haywood High School is ranked between 13,261-17,680 in National Rankings. High schools are ranked on performance on state-mandated tests, graduation, and other criteria. Within Tennessee High Schools, Haywood is ranked #244-351. The diversity of Haywood High School as of the 2023-2024 school year is: 68.1% Black, 23.2% White, 7.2% Hispanic, 1.0% Two or More Races, 0.4% other.

== Athletics ==
Boys' Basketball - Championship Record: 12-15

Girls' Basketball - Championship Record: 2-4

Football - Championship Record: 42-33

Boys' Soccer - Championship Record: 0-1

Girls' Soccer

Baseball - Championship Record: 0-2

Softball - Championship Record: 0-2

Boys' Tennis - Championship Record: 0-3

Girls' Tennis - Championship Record: 0-2

Boys' Track and Field - Championship Record: 2

Girls' Track and Field - Championship Record: 3

== Notable alumni ==
- Tony Delk, NBA basketball player
- Tristan Jarrett, professional basketball player
- Corey Moore, NFL linebacker
- Carlos Singleton, former professional football player
- Nettie Barcroft Taylor, state librarian of Maryland
- Jarvis Varnado, NBA basketball player, NCAA all-time leader in blocks as a member of the Mississippi State Bulldogs men's basketball team
- Alex Watkins, former professional football player
