= Haywood County Courthouse =

Haywood County Courthouse may refer to:

- Haywood County Courthouse (North Carolina), Waynesville, North Carolina
- Haywood County Courthouse (Tennessee), Brownsville, Tennessee, original home of Zion Church (Brownsville, Tennessee)
