= Dunbar-Carver Historic District =

- U.S. National Register of Historic Places
- Location within Tennessee Location within the United States
- Location: Along E. Jefferson St. & roughly bounded by Anderson Ave., E. Main St. & RR tracks, Brownsville, Tennessee
- Coordinates: 35°35′31″N 89°15′09″W
- Area: 32.7 acres (13.2 ha)
- MPS: Historic Resources of Brownsville, Tennessee
- NRHP reference No.: 14001224
- Added to NRHP: January 27, 2015

The Dunbar-Carver Historic District in Brownsville, Tennessee is a 32.7 acres (13.2 ha) historic district which was listed on the National Register of Historic Places in 2015.

The district is a historic center for Brownsville's African American middle-class citizens. It includes 23 contributing buildings and three non-contributing ones, mostly along East Jefferson Street in Brownsville. The district is centered around George Washington Carver High School.

It was listed on the National Register consistent with guidelines established in a 2014 study of historic resources in Brownsville.
