= Zion Church (Brownsville, Tennessee) =

Historic church in Tennessee, United States

- U.S. National Register of Historic Places
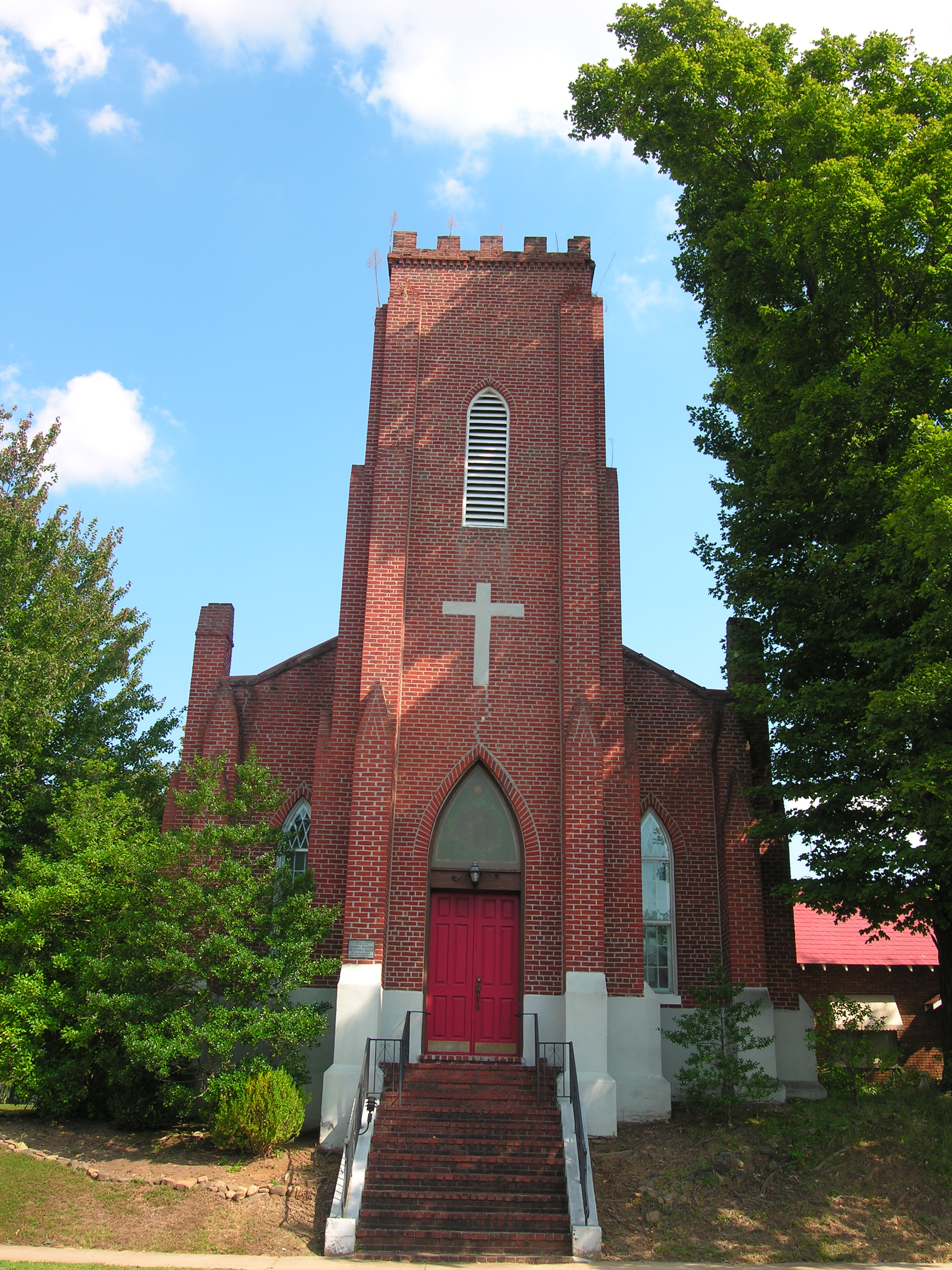

- Location within Tennessee Location within the United States
- Location: College and Washington Sts., Brownsville, Tennessee
- Coordinates: 35°35′44″N 89°15′42″W
- Area: 0.3 acres (0.12 ha)
- Built: 1854-c.1869
- Architect: Rev. James W. Rogers
- Architectural style: Gothic Revival
- NRHP reference No.: 78002601
- Added to NRHP: November 21, 1978

The Zion Church in Brownsville, Tennessee, United States, also known as Christ Episcopal Church, is a historic church at College and Washington Streets which was built during 1854 to c.1869. It was added to the National Register of Historic Places in 1978.

It is a brick Gothic Revival-style church designed by the Reverend James W. Rogers, who led a fund-raising drive that raised $3,200 for construction.

The Zion Church was organized in Brownsville on August 25, 1832 by Reverend John Chilton, who was the first Episcopal priest ordained in Tennessee, and by Reverend Thomas Wright. The congregation worshiped in the Haywood County Courthouse until construction of this church began in 1854. The church was largely completed in 1857 or 1858; its tower was built, and its altar and lectern were installed in 1868 or 1869. The church was consecrated as Zion Church on March 15, 1874. Its name was changed to Christ Church in 1895 to distinguish itself from two other Zion churches in Haywood County. The church was renovated in 1969 to install air conditioning and a parish house.
