= George Washington Carver High School (Brownsville, Tennessee) =

Location
- Brownsville, Tennessee; U.S.
- Coordinates: 35°35′32″N 89°15′20″W

Information
- Former name: Brownsville Colored Normal School; Dunbar School; Haywood Training School
- Type: Public
- Mascot: Wildcats
- Website: www.d-hct-chs-aa.com

George Washington Carver High School was a public secondary school in Brownsville, Tennessee. It served as the high school for black students until the public schools were integrated.

== History ==
Freedman's School For Blacks, later known as Dunbar School was built in Brownsville in the 1860s with money raised from local black residents as the first public school for African-Americans. The principal was John Gloster, and the assistant principal was George Currie. It served children in grades 1 through 8 before the building was destroyed in a fire in 1919. Education continued for several years, housed in three local churches, Farmer Chapel C.M.E., First Baptist, and Holiness (Brick Sanctified). In 1922, the school was rebuilt, with financial assistance from the Rosenwald fund, and was renamed the Haywood County Training School. In addition to accommodating children, the school also helped returning war veterans complete their education. From 1916 to 1936, Professor Jeffries served as principal. Reflecting the agricultural focus of the school, he was known as "the agriculture man", and in 1936 became Haywood County's first Negro Agricultural Extension Agent.

In 1950, a new high school was built, and named George Washington Carver High School, with principal Roy Bond, who served as principal until the last class graduated in 1970. When the schools were integrated, the high school students moved to Haywood High School, while the younger children were transferred to the newly built Eastside Elementary School. Carver's peak enrollment was over 1,600 students, accompanied by a staff of over 50. The buildings were located within the Dunbar-Carver Historic District and the former high school is now the site of the Dunbar Carver Museum of African-American history.

== Notable people ==
- Alline Bullock, songwriter
- Anna Mae Bullock, later known as Tina Turner, attended school, played basketball and cheered at Carver.
- Clay Evans, founding national board chairman of Operation PUSH
- Dwight Waller, professional basketball player for the Atlanta Hawks and the Denver Rockets
