= Woodland Baptist Church =

Historic church in Tennessee, United States

- U.S. National Register of Historic Places
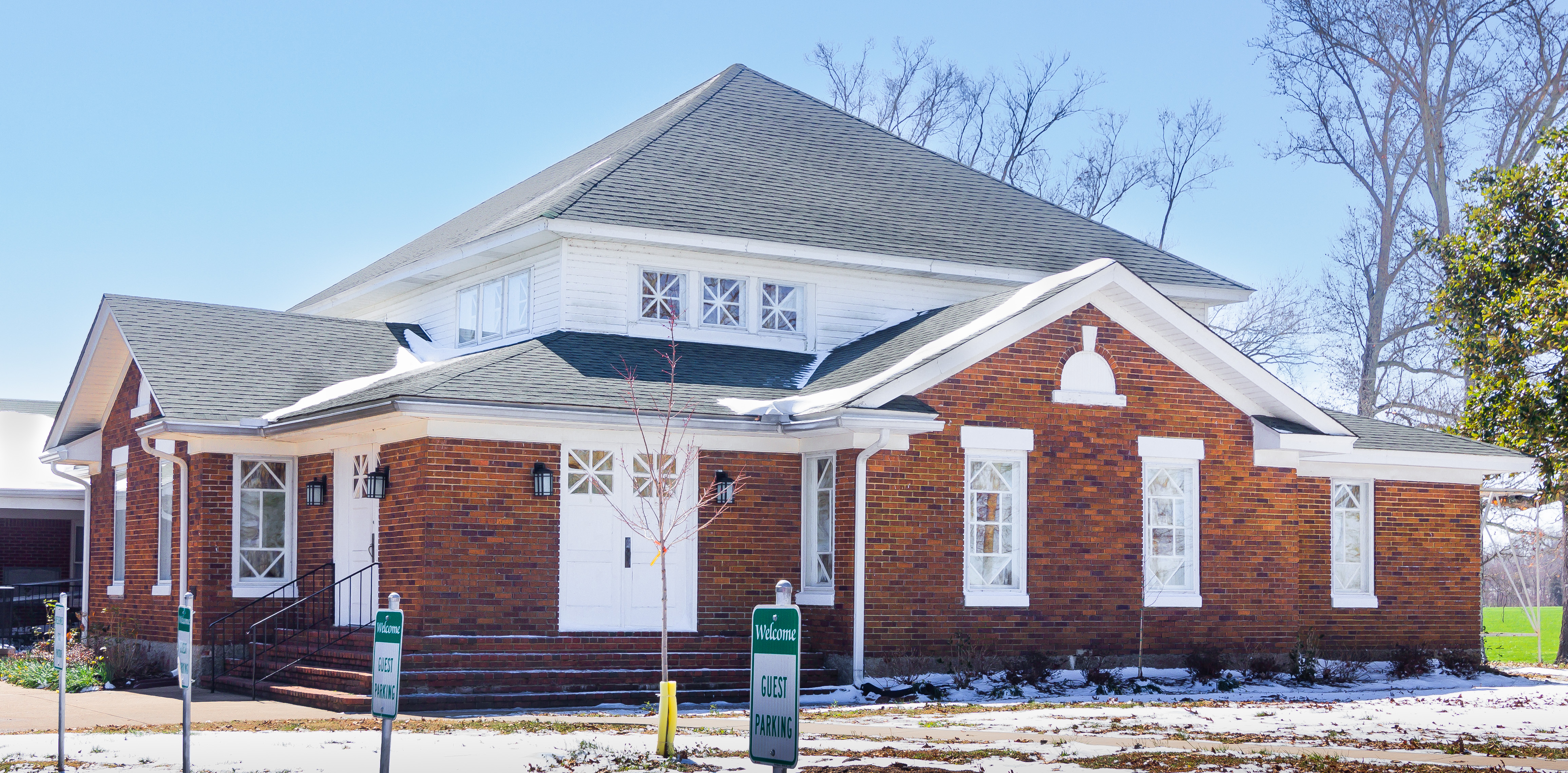

- Location within Tennessee Location within the United States
- Location: 885 Woodland Church Rd., Woodland, Tennessee
- Coordinates: 35°33′51″N 89°6′2″W
- Area: 6 acres (2.4 ha)
- Built: c.1920
- Architectural style: Bungalow/craftsman
- NRHP reference No.: 03000150
- Added to NRHP: March 26, 2003

Woodland Baptist Church is a historic church at 885 Woodland Church Road at Woodland in rural Haywood County, Tennessee. It was built in c. 1920 and added to the National Register in 2003.

Woodland Baptist Church has its origins in an earlier Haywood County congregation, namely Brown's Creek Baptist Church. This congregation was composed of some of Haywood and Madison County's earliest settlers. Little is known about this earlier church due to its later destruction following a fire.

In 1835, the Brown's Creek congregation split over disagreements regarding missionary effort, seeing the Brown's Creek Missionary Baptist Church being formed in response with Obadiah Dodson selected as its first pastor. This group's chosen site was just south of the current Woodland Church location. The church was relocated to its present site in 1869 following changes brought about by the Civil War. The present sanctuary was erected prior to 1920 and the church was renamed to Woodland Missionary Baptist Church. The educational annex was built in 1953.

It is unusual as an Akron plan church in rural Tennessee.
