= T. I. Webb Jr. =

American attorney and golfer (1880–1975)

- Born: May 3, 1880; Brownsville, Tennessee
- Died: August 14, 1975 (aged 95); Nashville, Tennessee
- Education: University School of Nashville; Vanderbilt University
- Occupation: Lawyer

Thomas Isham Webb Jr., (1880–1975) was a Tennessee attorney who excelled at golf and won the 1913 Tennessee state amateur. He was one of Tennessee's earliest golfers at the cusp of the sport's popularity in the United States near the beginning of the twentieth century. While a student at Vanderbilt University in 1896, Webb constructed a rudimentary nine-hole golf course next to University campus and the group attracted like-minded golf enthusiasts. Prominent citizens became interested and eventually formed a golf club which still exists over a century later. In 1901, Webb was a charter member of the Nashville Golf and Country Club where Grantland Rice, Webb's Vanderbilt classmate, first became interested in golf. The club was later renamed "Belle Meade Country Club" and Webb was the club golf champion in 1913 and 1917. At the time of his death at age 95, Webb was celebrated as club's oldest living member. He endowed an annual trophy for the Belle Meade Junior Golf championship; a room named for him was dedicated by in 1976 by sportswriter Fred Russell.

== Interest in golf ==
While a student at Vanderbilt in 1896, Webb and three other friends built a nine-hole golf course in a field adjacent to the Vanderbilt campus where University School now stands. Cattle grazed there and kept the grass low so the course didn't need mowing. Webb said there was no golf equipment available for purchase in Nashville at the time. The boys had gutta-percha balls and clubs with hickory shafts obtained by mail order; buried tomato cans were the holes. Prominent Nashvillians, some of whom had built similar links on their own property, became interested in golf and decided to form formed a golf-based club. They eventually purchased the Whitworth Estate near the intersection of Richland Pike (now Harding Road) and Golf Club Lane (now Bowling Avenue), and formed the "Nashville Golf and Country Club" on April 9, 1901. They built a clubhouse there with plans for an 18 hole golf course surrounding it. The Nashville streetcar came west out of downtown on what is now West End Avenue and ended at 29th Street; from there a mule-drawn wagon carried club members through a toll gate at Murphy Road to get to the clubhouse. The streetcar line was extended in 1911 to reach the club. They hired a Scottish golf pro named Robert MacAndrew (who later competed in the 1904 U.S. Open) to design a golf course rivaling the quality of those in Scotland.

In 1909 Webb's golf handicap was six. That year, he broke the Nashville Golf and Country Club course record on the back nine holes (35) but his record was broken three days later. In 1909, his former classmate Grantland Rice covered the Southern Amateur Golf Tournament at Webb's club, which, according to historian Robin Hardin, sparked the beginning of Rice's interest in golf. Webb was club champion in 1913 and 1917. He won the first Tennessee amateur golf tournament on October 25, 1913. The club later moved its clubhouse about 4 miles (6.4 km) west to Belle Meade to a new clubhouse and changed the name to Belle Meade Country Club. The design of Webb's state championship trophy was later used to create the Belle Meade letterhead and was used on blue blazers sold in the golf shop. Webb built a home at 4425 Warner Place within walking distance of the clubhouse in 1915, designed by Edward Dougherty an architect who also designed the Belle Meade Country Club and Nashville's War Memorial Auditorium.

At age 90, Webb was honored in 1970 with a birthday luncheon at Belle Meade attended by prominent citizens including sportswriter Waxo Green. In 1972, Webb endowed the "T.I. Webb Trophy" to the annual Junior Golf Champion. He also deeded his home on Warner Place to the club three years before he died, in exchange for the club letting him live there until his death. Historian Ridley Wills II called Webb's donation a "financial milestone" for Belle Meade Club. Webb died on August 14, 1975, at St. Thomas Hospital in Nashville with no immediate survivors. At the 1976 annual meeting, sportswriter Fred Russell gave a testimonial speech honoring Webb as part of dedication of a room for Webb and his portrait at the clubhouse.

== Biography ==
T.I. Webb Jr. was born May 3, 1880, in Brownsville, Tennessee, and his family moved to Nashville in 1883. He attended University School of Nashville and Vanderbilt University. He played fullback on the Vanderbilt football team. His mother died when he was seventeen years old. He received his law degree in 1902. He married Alice R. Smith in New York City on October 8, 1914.

His father, T.I. Webb (1838–1911), was born in Wilson County near Lebanon, Tennessee. He was a physician who served in the Confederate Army as assistant surgeon. After the war he moved to Brownsville, Tennessee, and practiced medicine and owned a retail pharmacy there. He moved to Nashville in 1883 and established a wholesale drug business as one of the founders of Spurlock & Page Company. The junior Webb's mother was Elizabeth Williams from Haywood County, Tennessee. She attended Marshall Institute in Mississippi before moving to Brownsville. She died in 1896 leaving four children. They were: Martha Walton Webb (Mrs. John E. Ritchey); Mary E. Webb, unmarried; Thomas I. Webb Jr, and David Webb.
