= Elbert Williams =

American, head of the local NAACP, who was murdered for registering to vote

- Elbert Williams, c. 1940
- Born: Elbert Williams; October 15, 1908; Haywood County, Tennessee, U.S.
- Died: June 20, 1940 (aged 31); Brownsville, Tennessee, U.S.
- Cause of death: Lynching
- Occupation: Civil rights activist
- Spouse: Annie Mitchell
- Parent(s): Mary Green and Albert Williams

Elbert Williams (October 15, 1908 – June 20, 1940) was an African-American civil rights leader from Brownsville, Tennessee who was killed by unknown persons. He was one of the five charter members of the NAACP branch in Brownsville. Killed in 1940, Williams is the first known NAACP member to be lynched for his civil rights activities.

No prosecution was undertaken at the time by state or federal authorities because of lack of evidence, although law enforcement officials were reportedly complicit in Williams's arrest and release to persons unknown. Under a 2018 civil rights cold case law, Williams's case was reopened in August 2018 for renewed investigation by the state.

== Biography ==
Williams was born in 1908 in rural Haywood County, Tennessee to a sharecropper family. His parents were Mary Green and Albert Williams. His grandfather had been a slave Williams attended classes through eighth grade at public schools, although there were no buildings for black elementary students.

In 1929 Williams married his high-school sweetheart Annie Mitchell. The Great Depression prevented Williams and his wife from farming, so they moved to Brownsville in the early 1930s. They found work at the Sunshine Laundry, where Elbert worked as a fireman and Annie worked as a presser.

On June 12, 1939, Williams and four others from Brownsville established a local chapter of the NAACP. The branch was the fifth one in Tennessee. Elbert and Annie were both charter members. Although African Americans were legally allowed to vote, they were prohibited from voting in Brownsville and in other areas of the state, largely through voter registration obstacles. The goal of the chapter was to register and exercise their right to vote.

On the night of June 20, 1940, Sheriff Samuel "Tip" Hunter and police officer Charles Reed took Williams from his home and jailed him to interrogate him about the NAACP. Hunter claimed to have released Williams. Williams was never seen alive after this night.

Three days later, on the morning of June 23, 1940, Williams's body was found in the Hatchie River. He had been killed; he was identified by his wife. In August 1940, a Grand Jury was convened and ruled William's death as a "homicide by parties unknown." His was the last recorded lynching in Tennessee.

Since the late 20th century, civil rights crimes have received renewed attention from activists and law enforcement. On June 20, 2015, a state historical marker to honor Williams was unveiled in Haywood County. Under Tennessee's new Civil Rights Crime Cold Case Law of 2018, Williams' case has been reopened. District Attorney Garry G. Brown for the 28th Judicial District of Tennessee reopened the case in August 2018.

== Brownsville NAACP and Voting Rights ==
At the time, Haywood County was one of three counties in Tennessee in which African Americans were not permitted to vote. On May 6, 1940, Reverend Buster Walker, president, Taylor Newburn, and Elisha Davis, each executive members of the NAACP, plus members John Lester and John Gaines, visited the county registrar's office in order to register to vote. The five members were directed to Judge J.T. Pearson, who directed them to the Electoral Commission to register. The men were told that registration would not begin until August.

After these five tried to vote, some of the white community began to threaten the NAACP members. Reverend Walker and Davis received threats from the police chief, the mayor, and former mayor that there would be trouble if any African American registered or were encouraged to register to vote. No African Americans registered to vote for the 1940 election.

== Lynching ==
Williams was negotiating to purchase Elisha Davis's gas station and become a business owner. He had already joined the NAACP as a founding member. At 1:00 am on June 16, 1940, Davis was taken from his house by a white mob of about 50 to 60 people, which was led by Hunter and Reed. The mob drove to the house of Reverend Buster Walker, who could not be found. The mob took Davis to the banks of the Hatchie River, questioning him about NAACP activities. Alber Mann, a local businessman, threatened Davis's life and told him that he would be released if he gave the mob information about the NAACP chapter and its members. Davis told them information of members that were already public knowledge. After the mob released Davis, he promised to leave town, and fled to Jacksonville.

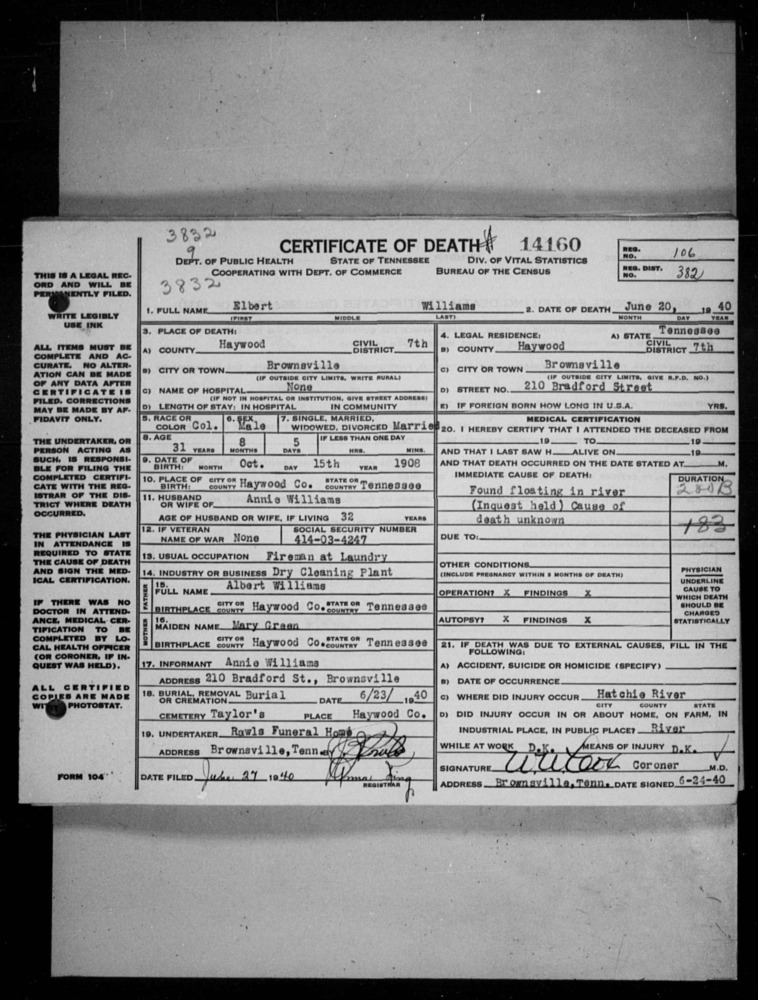
Elbert Williams Death Certificate

A few days later on June 20, 1940, Hunter, Reed, and Ed Lee, a Coca-Cola plant manager, showed up to Williams's home late at night. Although already dressed for bed and barefoot, Williams was forced to go outside to speak with Hunter and Reed. They asked him some questions before forcing him into a car, which drove away. Annie Williams never saw her husband of eleven years alive again.

Hunter drove Williams and Thomas Davis, Elisha Davis's younger brother, to the police station, where they were jailed. After questioning Davis and Williams about their NAACP activity, the police released Davis into a crowd of 40 to 50 white men at about 1:30 am. Annie Williams walked to City Hall where Williams was supposed to be been held and could not find him. She spoke to Reed, who did not report having seen Williams.

On the morning of June 23, 1940, a fisherman found Williams's body in the Hatchie River. The undertaker Al Rawls asked to meet Annie at the river so she could identify the body. Annie saw that Williams had holes in his chest, and visible bruises indicating he had been beaten. Williams' head looked twice its size because it had been beaten so badly. His hands and feet were bound. His neck was wrapped with a rope that was attached to a log to ensure he stayed underwater. The coroner instructed that the body be immediately buried. On the same day that his body was found, Williams was buried at the Taylor Cemetery in Brownsville. The Hatchie River was recorded as the place of death for Williams, and the cause of death was listed as unknown.

== Federal and state investigation ==
The Tennessee State authorities convened a grand jury under Judge W.W. Bond. According to the foreman of the grand jury, after a three-day investigation, no evidence was presented to identify any person as the perpetrator of the violence.

Williams's death was investigated by the Federal Bureau of Investigation (FBI) and the Justice Department. William McCalahan was the United States Attorney for the Western District of Tennessee and led the investigation. The secretary of the NAACP, Walter White, aided McCalahan with the NAACP's report of the events in Brownsville.

The local FBI prepared a report on the case that indicated doubts that any laws had been violated and questioned the need for further investigation. On July 12, 1940, Assistant Attorney General John Rogge told the NAACP of Brownsville that he had requested the FBI to actively investigate the case. On November 28, 1940, the United States Attorney's office in Memphis told the FBI that no more contacts in the case needed to be investigated. On March 31, 1941, Assistant Attorney General Wendell Berge sent a letter to McCalahan stating that the federal law was violated and the FBI should continue its investigation.

McCalahan presented an FBI report to Berge In September 1941 and on October 2, Berge wrote that the department has decided to take the case to a grand jury. On December 23, Victor Rotem, Chief of the Civil Rights Section at the Department of Justice, released a memorandum that Williams's case did not provide enough evidence to present to a trial jury. In January 1942, a year and a half after the assault and murder of Williams, the Justice Department determined that there was not sufficient evidence to warrant prosecution.
