= Lucerne (Brownsville, Tennessee) =

- U.S. National Register of Historic Places
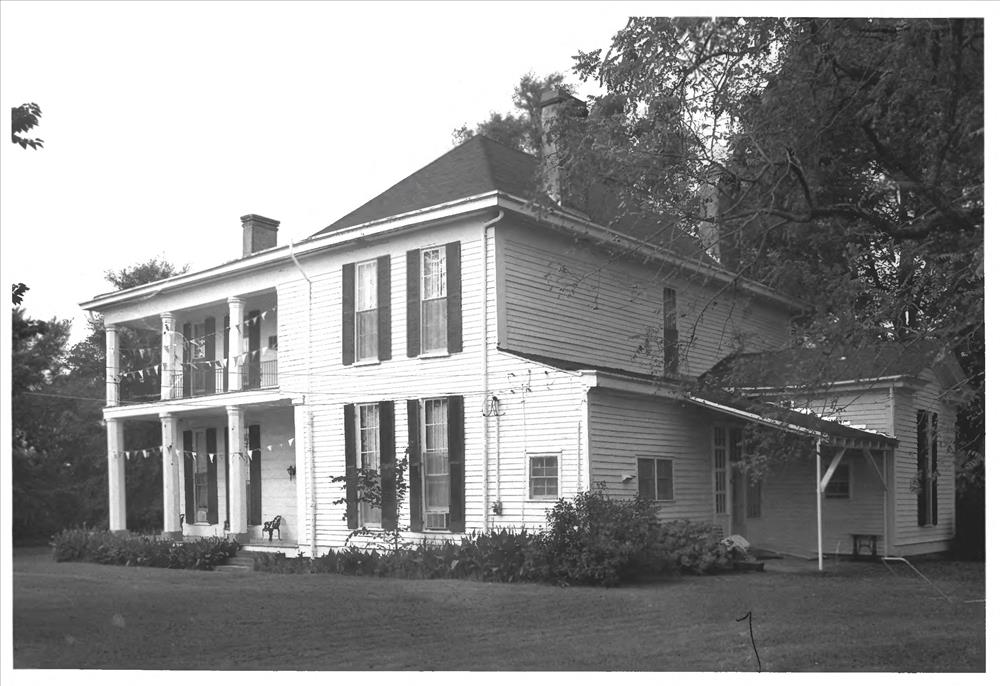
- Exterior of Lucerne, Brownsville, Tennessee

- Location within Tennessee Location within the United States
- Nearest city: Brownsville, Tennessee
- Coordinates: 35°20′48″N 89°20′30″W
- Area: 3.7 acres (1.5 ha)
- Built: 1855
- Architectural style: Greek Revival
- NRHP reference No.: 77001269
- Added to NRHP: December 23, 1977

Lucerne, also known as Catron Place, is a historic house on a former plantation in Brownsville, Tennessee, U.S.. It was built in 1855 by slaves for Peter Mosby. It became known as Catron Place in 1904, when it was acquired by the Catron family.

The house was designed in the Greek Revival architectural style. It has been listed on the National Register of Historic Places since December 23, 1977.
