= Jimmy Oldham =

American baseball player

- Pitcher
- Born: April 15, 1893; Brownsville, Tennessee, U.S.
- Died: April 21, 1930 (aged 37); St. Louis, Missouri, U.S.
- Batted: Right Threw: Right

Negro league baseball debut
- 1920, for the St. Louis Giants

Last appearance
- 1923, for the St. Louis Stars

Teams
- St. Louis Giants (1920–1921); St. Louis Stars (1922–1923)

James Oldham (April 15, 1893 – April 21, 1930) was an American Negro league pitcher in the 1920s.

A native of Brownsville, Tennessee, Oldham made his Negro leagues debut in 1920 for the St. Louis Giants. He played for the club (renamed the "Stars" in 1922) for four seasons through 1923. Oldham died in St. Louis, Missouri in 1930 at age 37.
