= North Washington Historic District =

- U.S. National Register of Historic Places
- Location within Tennessee Location within the United States
- Location: Roughly bounded by N. Wilson & N. Park Aves., Thomas & E. Main Sts., Brownsville, Tennessee
- Coordinates: 35°35′44″N 89°15′37″W
- Area: 78.7 acres (31.8 ha)
- MPS: Historic Resources of Brownsville, Tennessee
- NRHP reference No.: 14000448
- Added to NRHP: January 27, 2015

The North Washington Historic District in Brownsville, Tennessee is a 78.7 acres (31.8 ha) historic district which was listed on the National Register of Historic Places in 2015.

It includes 126 contributing buildings and 25 non-contributing ones, as well a contributing structure and three non-contributing sites.

It was listed on the National Register consistent with guidelines established in a 2014 study of historic resources in Brownsville.
