= Nettie Barcroft Taylor =

State librarian of Maryland

- Born: 1914; Brownsville, Tennessee
- Died: October 21, 2016 (aged 102); Gwynn Oak, Maryland
- Occupation: Librarian

Nettie Barcroft Taylor (1914–2016) was the Maryland State Librarian for several decades (1960–1988).

Taylor was born in Brownsville, Tennessee, where she was the 1932 valedictorian of Haywood High School. She graduated from Florida State College for Women and began her career as a librarian at the County high school in Taylor County, Florida.

In 1942, Taylor earned a master's degree in library science from the University of North Carolina, and she joined the Women's Army Corps, becoming the Command Librarian for the U.S. Army in Heidelberg, Germany.

In 1948, Taylor was hired by the Maryland State Department of Education as supervisor for county and institutional libraries. In 1960, she was promoted to Assistant State Superintendent for Libraries and Chief, Division of Library Development and Services for the Maryland State Department of Education, a.k.a. the Maryland State Librarian. She served in that role until her retirement in 1988.

Taylor was active in the American Library Association and lobbied for the passage of the Library Services Act in 1956. She served as president of the Maryland Library Association, she was a founding member of the Chief Officers Of State Library Agencies, and she served as president of the Association for Specialized and Cooperative Library Agencies.

Taylor received the Maryland Library Association's Distinguished Service Award in 1979, the American Library Association's Joseph W. Lippincott Award in 1984, and the Metropolitan Washington Council of Governments Library Council Outstanding Service Award in 1986. She was inducted into the Maryland Women's Hall of Fame in 1995. In 2005, she was awarded American Library Association Honorary Membership.

In October 2016, Taylor died of respiratory failure at her home in Gwynn Oak, Maryland.

In November 2016 the Maryland Library Association renamed its Leadership Institute the Nettie B. Taylor Maryland Library Leadership Institute.
