= Joshua K. Hutchison House =

- U.S. National Register of Historic Places
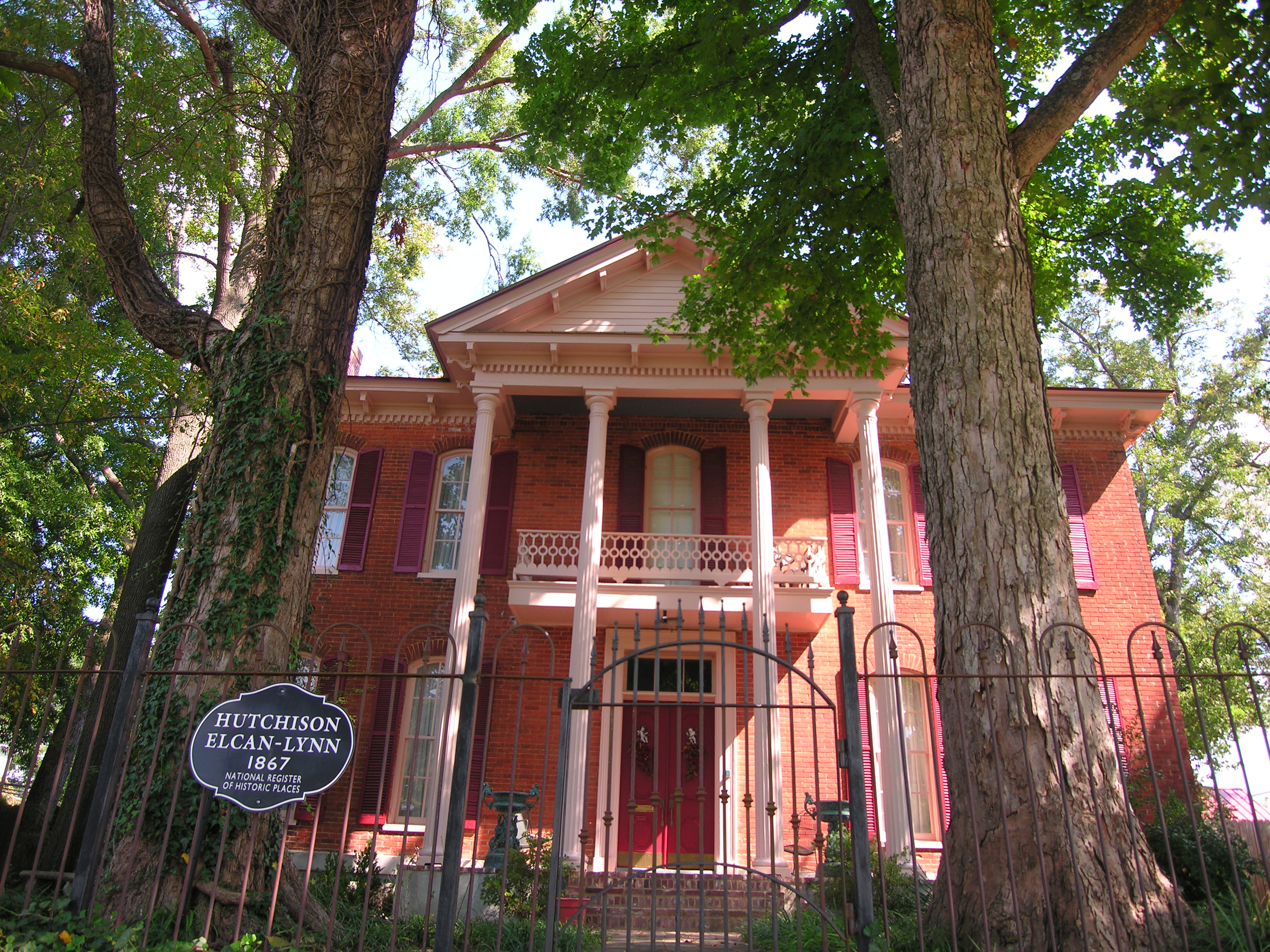

- Location within Tennessee Location within the United States
- Location: 124 N. Church Ave., Brownsville, Tennessee
- Coordinates: 35.595556°N 89.258611°W
- Area: less than one acre
- Built: 1868
- Architectural style: Greek Revival, Italianate
- NRHP reference No.: 88001022
- Added to NRHP: July 7, 1988

The Joshua K. Hutchison House, also known as the Elcan House, in Brownsville, Tennessee, was built in 1868. It was listed on the National Register of Historic Places on July 7, 1988.

It is a two-story brick masonry building with a rear ell in a commanding position over the intersection of North Church Street and East College Street. It was built for Joshua Kelly Hutchison (1839-1903), a cotton businessman and local politician, and his wife, Isabella Seymour Hutchison (1841-1909). It has a "finely proportioned portico" and has "fine ornamental plaster work" in its interior. Its design combines elements of Greek Revival and Italianate architecture.

The interior features a grand spiral staircase in the entrance hall and high ceilings in the entry and parlor feature grape, egg, and dart dado.
