= Temple Adas Israel (Brownsville, Tennessee) =

Historic Reform synagogue in Tennessee, US

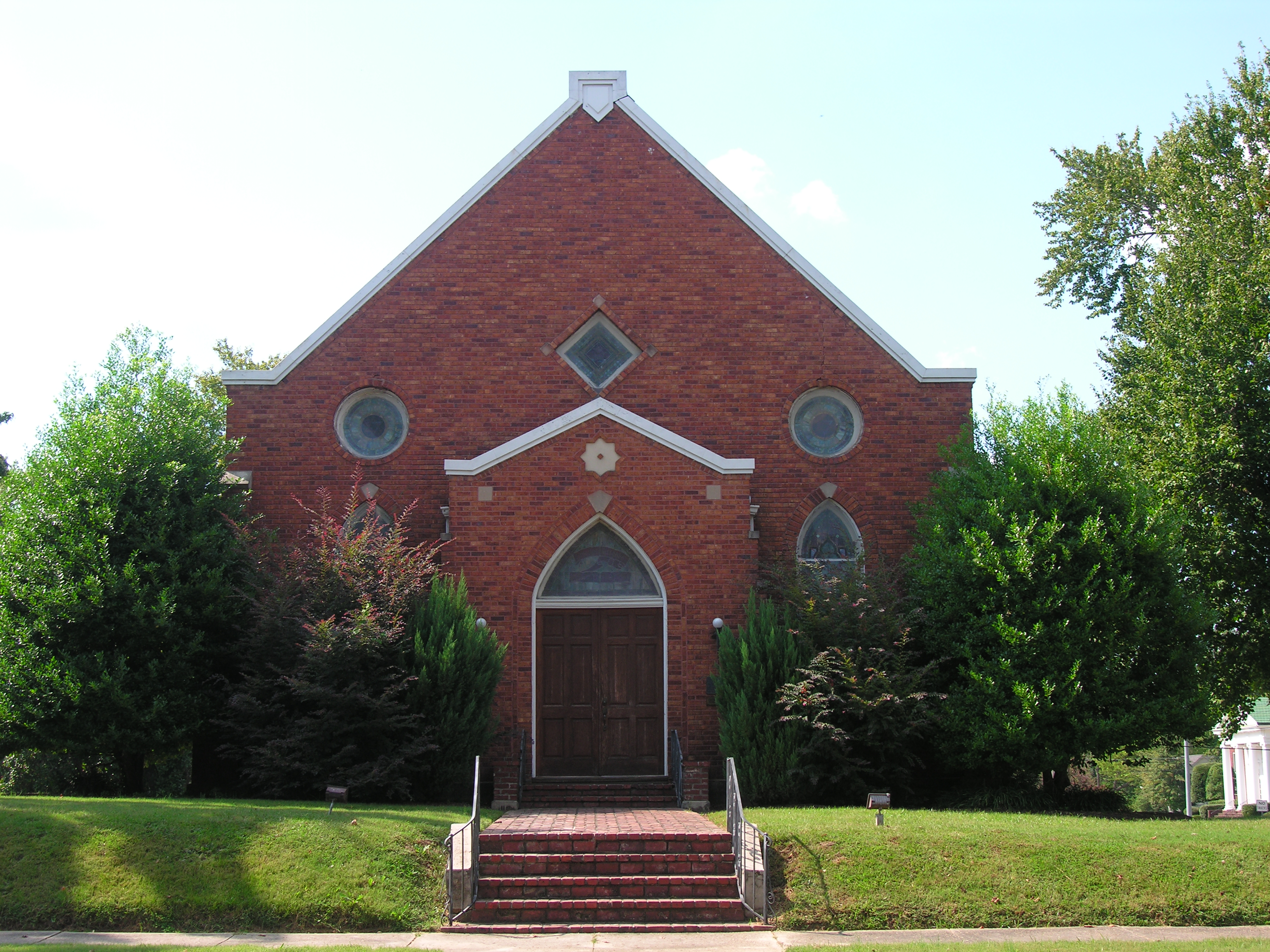

- Location in Tennessee

Religion
- Affiliation: Reform Judaism
- Ecclesiastical or organisational status: Synagogue
- Leadership: Lay led
- Status: Active

Location
- Location: Washington and College Streets, Brownsville, Tennessee
- Country: United States
- Coordinates: 35°35′44″N 89°15′45″W

Architecture
- Type: Synagogue
- Style: Gothic Revival
- Established: 1867 (as a congregation)
- Completed: 1882

Website
- brownsvilletemple.org
- Temple Adas Israel
- U.S. National Register of Historic Places
- NRHP reference No.: 79002445
- Added to NRHP: January 19, 1979

Temple Adas Israel is an historic Reform Jewish synagogue located at the intersection of Washington and College streets in Brownsville, West Tennessee. Built in 1882 by German Jewish immigrants and descendants, it is the oldest synagogue building in Tennessee and one of fewer than one hundred surviving 19th-century synagogues in the country. On January 19, 1979, Temple Adas Israel was added to the National Register of Historic Places.

== History ==
Brownsville's Jewish community began when two German Ashkenazim immigrants, brothers Joseph and Solomon Sternberger, founded the Adas Israel Congregation in 1867. As immigrants to the United States, the Sternbergers had brought a Torah written on sheepskin. Led by lay-rabbi Isaac Levi, the Orthodox community first met for prayers in the home of Jacob and Karoline Felsenthal. Over the next fifteen years, members of Adas Israel moved toward Reform Judaism and membership grew to 25 families.

In 1878, the congregation founded Adas Israel Cemetery, a Jewish burial ground still in use today. In 1879, the congregation adopted the reform mode of worship. The congregation became too large to continue meeting in local homes. They built a 200-seat wooden synagogue in 1882. A large ceremony took place on March 2, 1882, for the synagogue's dedication. Attendees included many of the city's non-Jews as well as members of the congregation. Emil Tamm became the first lay leader of the congregation in its new temple until his death in 1907.

The Adas Israel congregation has never had a full-time rabbi. Lay leaders have included Joseph Sternberger's grandson Abe Sternberger from 1909 to 1931, Morton Felsenthal from 1936 to 1983, Emil Tamm's great-grandson Fred Silverstein Sr., and Fred Silverstein Jr. from 1988 to present. In the late 1970s, Carolyn Celia Key Raney, great-great-granddaughter of Isaac Levi, served as a lay reader, standing in for Morton Felsenthal during his one-year leave of absence. She re-established the Temple's Sunday school. In 1922, the congregation officially joined the Union of American Hebrew Congregations. In the late 1970s, the congregation established a small religious school to accommodate five students. When these students graduated, the school closed.

At one time, there were thirty Jewish families in regular attendance. The local Jewish populated peaked in the late 1890s when an estimated 200 Jews lived in town. The economic depression of the 1890s contributed to the decline of Jewish families living in the area, with around 100 left by the turn of the century. During the late 20th century, the congregation's membership began to decline as families moved to larger cities. In the early 21st century, about 12 families attend Sabbath services on Friday night at Temple Adas Israel. Today, an estimated six Jews remain in Brownsville.

== Architecture ==
Temple Adas Israel is a modest example of Gothic Revival architecture and was modeled after the United Hebrew Congregation Temple in Louisville, Kentucky. It originally featured a small steeple, an extremely rare feature for a synagogue.

A particularly beautiful suite of thirteen stained glass windows, arched in Gothic style, were installed in 1910. The window above the Torah ark is unusual in a synagogue as it depicts a large, realistic human eye, similar to the Eye of Providence found on the one-dollar bill and in Masonic iconography.

The building underwent a major renovation in the 1920s under the leadership of Abe Sternberger. The wooden siding was replaced with brick, the steeple was removed, the rostrum was enlarged, and new pews and an organ were installed.
