= Billy Tripp =

Tennessee artist, writer, and creator of The Mindfield sculpture in Brownsville

Coordinates: 35.59298°N 89.266582°W

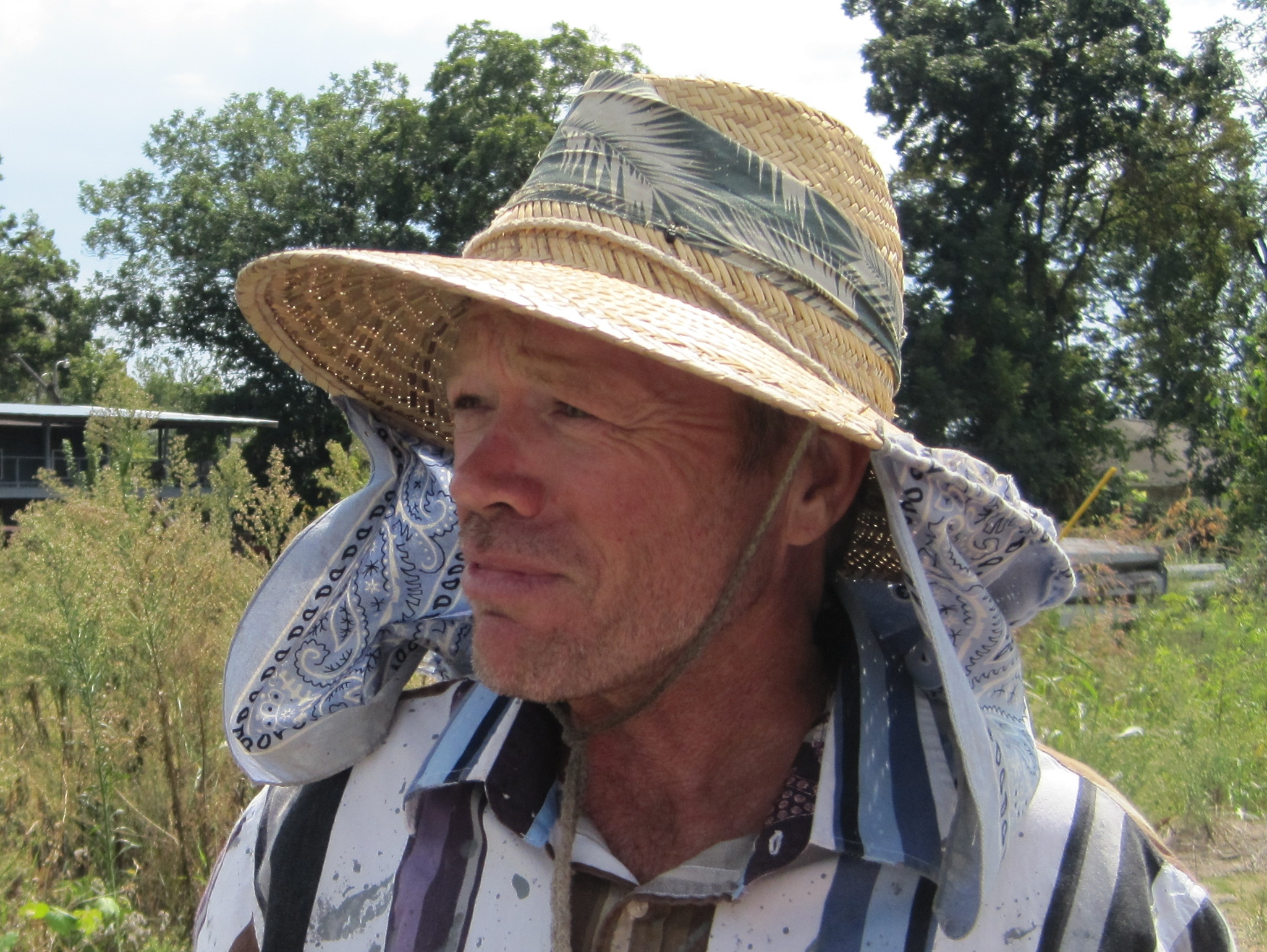
Billy Tripp (2011)

William Blevins Tripp (born 1955 in Jackson, Tennessee), is an American outsider artist, poet, writer, painter, welder, and sculptor, known primarily for his metal sculpture The Mindfield and his stream-of-consciousness autobiography novel, The Mindfield Years Vol. 1: The Sycamore Trees (1996).

Born to Rev. Charles Tripp, a Methodist Minister and business owner of the nationally recognized Tripp Country Hams store, Billy Tripp attended trade school for welding as well as a number of college art courses. He began building his life's work, The Mindfield, in 1989 while simultaneously writing his novel The Sycamore Trees and keeping a journal that would later become The Mindfield Years Vol. 3: The Mindfield Notes. Filled with symbols reflecting on his past and contemplations on life and death, The Mindfield has steadily grown over the last three decades, and Tripp will continue to expand it until he is no longer physically able. It is currently the largest sculpture in Tennessee. He has permission from the city of Brownsville to be buried in his sculpture and has arranged for his work to be preserved by the Kohler Foundation. His life and work is documented in the film The Steel Garden.

== Biography ==
Billy was born in 1955 to Charles and Mabel Blevins Tripp in Jackson, TN. They moved to Brownsville in 1963 when Billy was in the third grade. As a teenager, Billy worked for his father at Tripp Country Hams. After graduating high school, Billy moved to Knoxville to find work, and then returned to Brownsville shortly after. He attended welding trade school for six weeks, just long enough to complete the mandatory safety training, before making the decision to teach himself. He also attended Jackson State Community College and The University of Memphis where he attended art classes from each before leaving to pursue artistic endeavors such as writing, painting, sculpting, and poetry.

Billy Tripp (2007)

In 1989 he began the construction of his lifelong project, The Mindfield. As he started, it attracted the attention of the city and the local news media. He was ordered to stop building and summoned to city hall where he was asked to explain the purpose of his construction. He was interviewed by local papers such as The States Graphic and The Jackson Sun, and covered by Nashville channel 4 news.

Tripp had a close relationship with his father, and when he died in 2002 Tripp began dealing with his grief by single-handedly constructing “Deena”, the water tower in The Mindfield. Years later, he met and married his wife, Dr. Beth Shaw Tripp, and constructed a silhouette of her in The Mindfield with the title “MF Interpreter.”

Tripp aspired to meet one of his favorite authors and left a note for William Least Heat-Moon at a pub the author frequented. Billy later received a reply letter and the two met. Heat-Moon gave Billy his steel canoe which he used to travel the waterways in his book River Horse. The Canoe is now prominently displayed in The Mindfield.

Billy continues to work on and expand The Mindfield every year, except in the winter, when he takes a break to write. Upon his death, he has permission from the city of Brownsville to be interred in his sculpture. Billy's life and work is documented in the feature-length film The Steel Garden, which had a premiere in Brownsville, Tennessee in February 2024 and was released online via YouTube the following month.

== The Mindfield ==
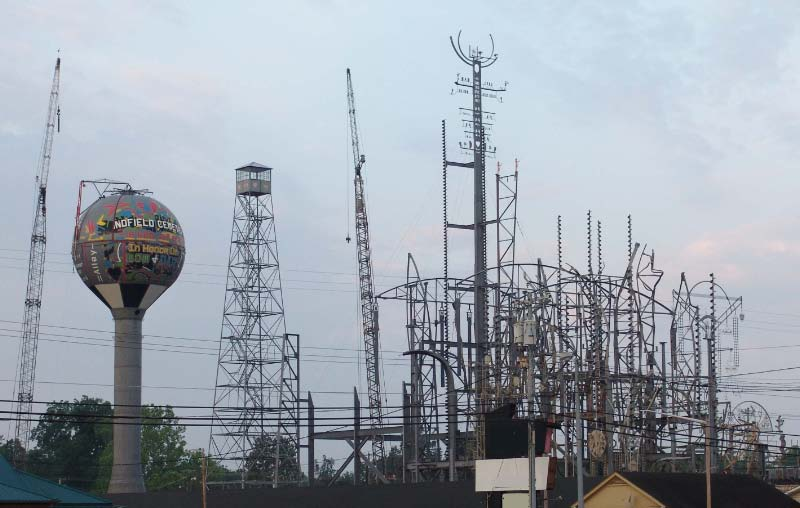
The Mindfield, circa 2008

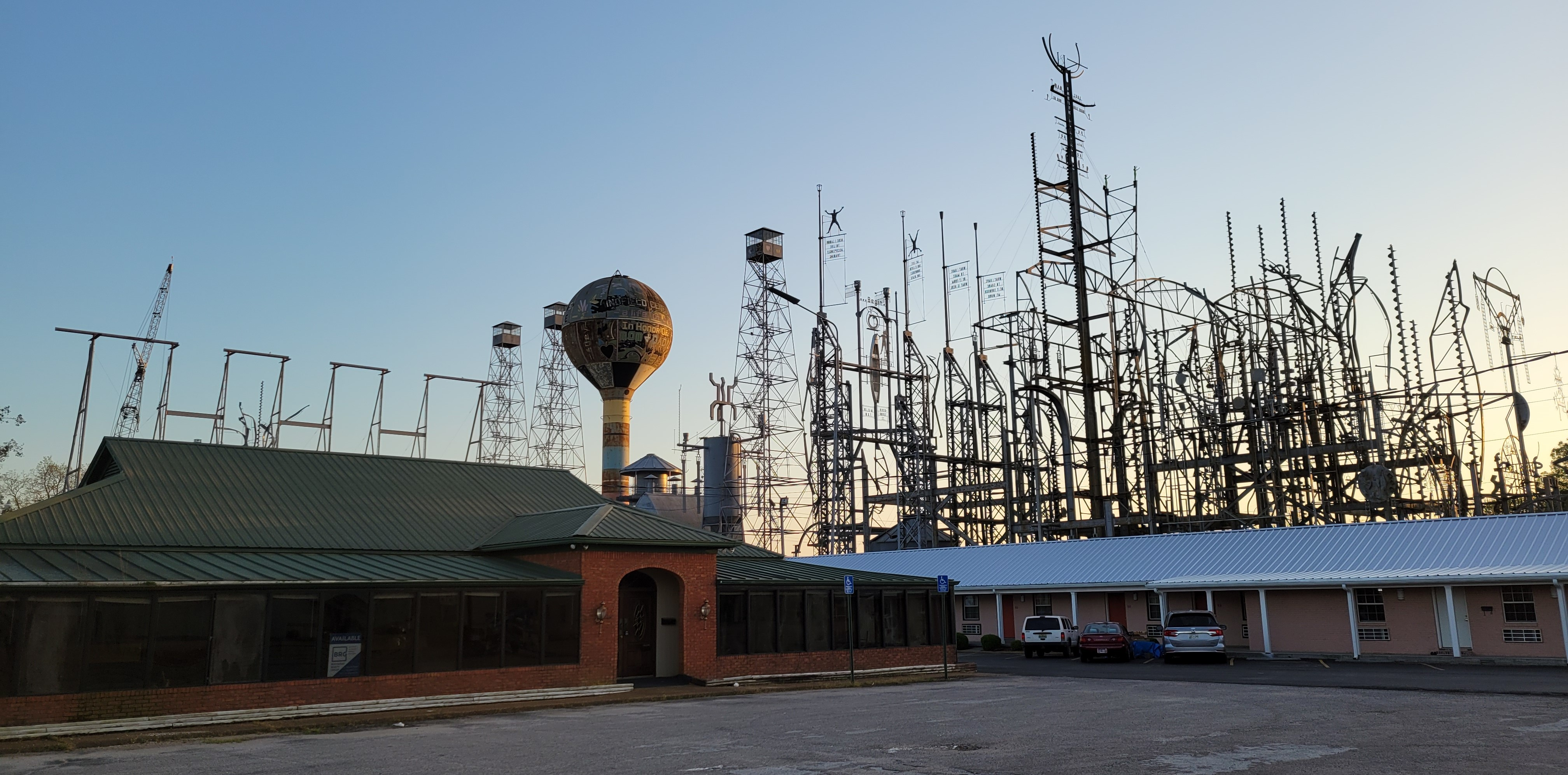
The Mindfield, 2022

The Mindfield (also known as The Mindfield Cemetery) is the sculpture and lifelong project by Billy Tripp. Begun in 1989, the sculpture is the largest in Tennessee at 127 feet high and the length of a football field. Billy assembles every piece of The Mindfield alone using cranes and by climbing the structure itself.

The Mindfield contains symbols that reflect on the nature of life and death, as well as memorializing events in Tripp's own life. His “Deena” water tower was deconstructed, transported from a defunct factory in Kentucky, and reconstructed in The Mindfield single-handedly by Tripp, apart from hiring a contractor to pour a concrete base for the tower. Both the water tower and the tallest point in The Mindfield (which he refers to as his father's grave marker) are dedicated to his parents. He also has pieces in The Mindfield dedicated to his wife, his favorite authors, and reflecting on his past beliefs. Structurally, The Mindfield is intended to resemble a cathedral or a ship.

The Mindfield also contains symbols and references to characters and events from Tripp's book The Sycamore Trees. Tripp's self-published series of books, The Mindfield Years, is an essential companion piece to the sculpture, important to understanding its meaning. Vol. 1 is a stream of consciousness novel, serving as a fictionalized autobiography. Vol. 3 is transcribed journals written during the early years of The Mindfield's construction and documents his daily work on the sculpture. Vol. 4 is transcribed journals from the period when Tripp was mourning the loss of his father and erecting the “Deena” water tower. Requiem For a Young Man is a short journal that Tripp kept in the 70's when he was attending college art classes.

The Mindfield has been documented by various news outlets and institutions, including The Smithsonian Institution, The National Ornamental Metal Museum, The Tennessee Museum, and Spaces Archives. His work will be preserved by the Kohler Foundation upon his death.

== Bibliography ==
- The Mindfield Years Vol. 1: The Sycamore Trees
- The Mindfield Years Vol. 3: The Midfield Notes - Notebooks One and Two
- The Mindfield Years Vol. 3: The Midfield Notes - Notebook Three
- The Mindfield Years Vol. 3: The Midfield Notes - Notebooks Four and Five
- The Mindfield Years Vol. 4: My Year Of Deena, Goodbye to Dad [And to Mom] Books 1 & 2
- The Mindfield Years, FIRST DIARIES (Pre-Volume I)- Requiem for a Young Man
