= Clay Evans (pastor) =

American pastor and gospel musician (1925–2019)

- Born: June 23, 1925; Brownsville, Tennessee, U.S.
- Died: November 27, 2019 (aged 94) Chicago, Illinois, U S.
- Genres: gospel, black gospel, urban contemporary gospel
- Occupations: Minister, Pastor singer, songwriter
- Instruments: vocals, singer-songwriter
- Years active: 1950–2019
- Labels: Savoy, Jewel, Paula, Meek, Blackberry, Pro-Arte

Clay Evans (June 23, 1925 – November 27, 2019) was an African American Baptist pastor and founder of the influential Fellowship Missionary Baptist Church in Chicago, Illinois, famous for its gospel music infused Sunday service and choir. Evans released his first musical project in 1975, Live Vibrations from the Ship. All-in-all, he has had eleven albums that have charted on the Billboard Gospel Albums chart over the course of his career. He received a nomination for the Best Gospel Album at the 1997 Soul Train Music Awards.

== Professional life ==
Evans was born on June 23, 1925, in Brownsville, Tennessee, to Henry Clay and Estanauly Evans. He was a graduate of Carver High School, then he moved onto Chicago Baptist Institute for seminary education. He attended Northern Seminary, along with The University of Chicago Divinity School. He was ordained as a Baptist minister in 1950, and he founded Fellowship Missionary Baptist Church in Chicago, Illinois, on September 10, 1950, with five founding members. His sermons were broadcast on radio and television.

In 1965, Evans joined the Reverend Jesse Jackson Sr., to promote the civil rights movement in Chicago. In 1971 they founded the Operation PUSH coalition to encourage black self-help. Evans served as chairman of the organization from 1971 and 1976 and became its chairman emeritus. He led his church until December 8, 2000, when Charles Jenkins succeeded him as senior pastor.

== Personal life ==
Evans married Lutha Mae Hollingshed on October 15, 1946; they resided in Chicago, Illinois. They have five children, seven grandchildren, three great grandchildren and one great great granddaughter. Evans's death was announced on November 27, 2019. Evans's funeral was held on December 7, 2019.

== Music career ==
Evans' music career started in 1951, and he has released 24 musical projects, up until his latest release in 2006. He has released albums and musical works with various labels; Savoy Records, Jewel Records, Paula Records, Meek Records, Blackberry Records, and Pro-Arte Records. His album have charted on the Billboard charts at various times during his career. He has had eleven albums chart on the Billboard Gospel Albums chart, during that time span. He received a nomination at the 1997 Soul Train Music Awards for Best Gospel Album.

== Discography ==
- Live Vibrations from the Ship (1975)
- God Will Supply (1976)
- Every Kind in the Net (1978)
- Everything Will Be Alright (1979)
- You Ought to Take Time out to Praise the Lord (1979)
- Clark Road Baptist Church (1980)
- Shine on Me (1981)
- He Knows How Much We Can Bear (1982)
- Be Still and Know That I Am God (1983)
- What He's Done For Me (1984)
- Sweet Hour Of Prayer/What A Fellowship Hour (1985)
- Things Are Going To Work Out Somehow (1985)
- From The Ship (1987)
- He'll Be There (1988)
- Reach Beyond the Break (1990)
- I'm Going Through (1992)
- I See A Miracle (1994)
- I've Got a Testimony (1995)
- The Wine Is Running Out (1996)
- Coming Home (1996)
- The Collection (1998)
- Constantly (2001)
- Still in the Mix (2003)
- It's Me Again (2006)
