= Stanton Masonic Lodge and School =

- U.S. National Register of Historic Places
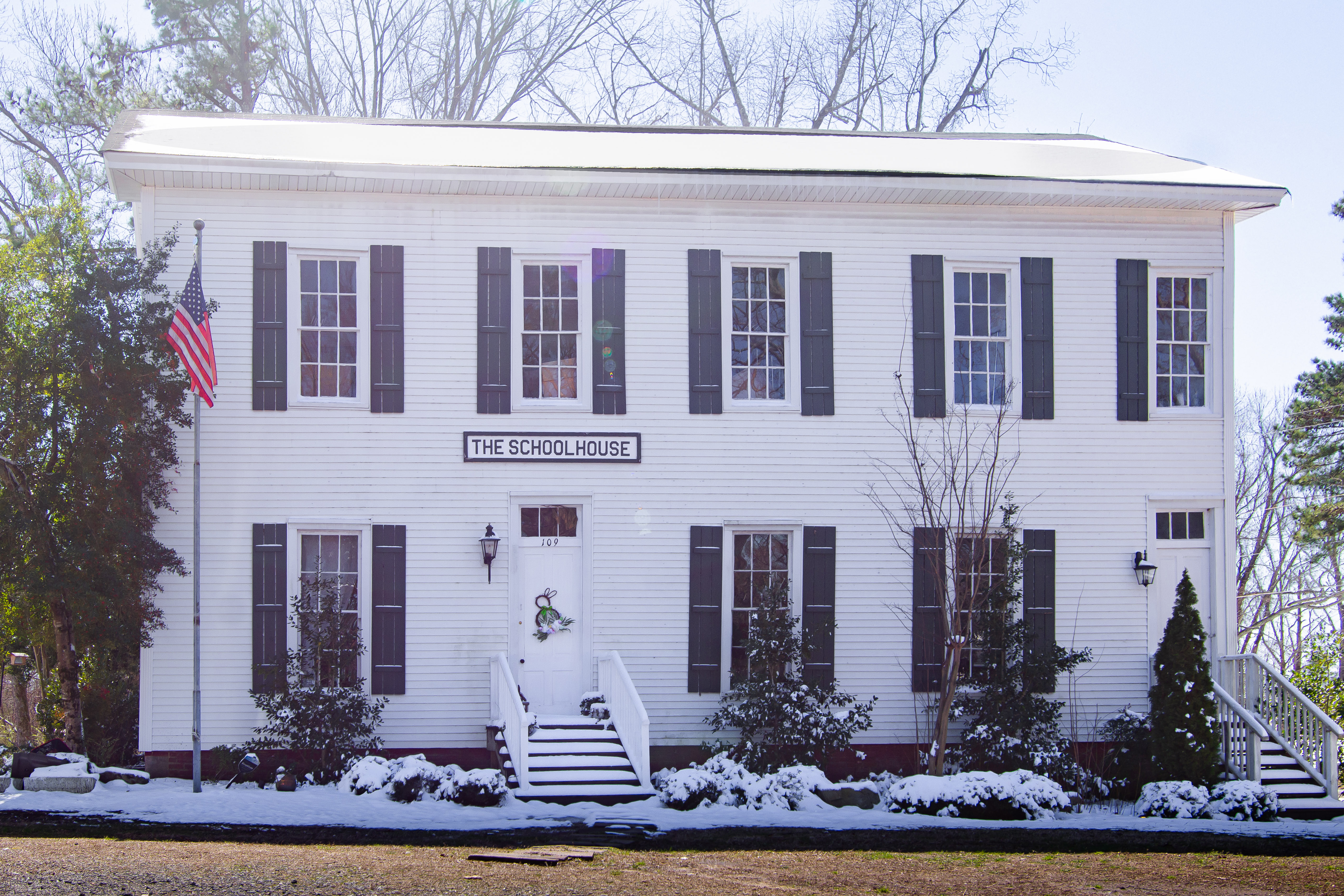

- Location within Tennessee Location within the United States
- Location: 109 W. Main St., Stanton, Tennessee
- Coordinates: 35°27′56″N 89°24′17″W
- Area: less than one acre
- Built: 1871
- Architectural style: Greek Revival
- NRHP reference No.: 87001878
- Added to NRHP: October 22, 1987

The Stanton Masonic Lodge and School (also known as the Old Masonic Lodge and Stanton School House or the Old School House) is a historic building located in Stanton, Tennessee. It was constructed in 1871 by the Stanton Masonic Lodge, which had been chartered a few years earlier (the lodge no longer exists) The Masons provided the first floor of the building for use as a school and used the second floor for their meetings. After a public school was established by Haywood County in 1920 the building was used for a variety of other community purposes.

Some restoration of the building was undertaken beginning in 1985. The Greek Revival style building listed in the National Register of Historic Places in 1987.
