= Brownsville Carnegie Library =

- U.S. National Register of Historic Places
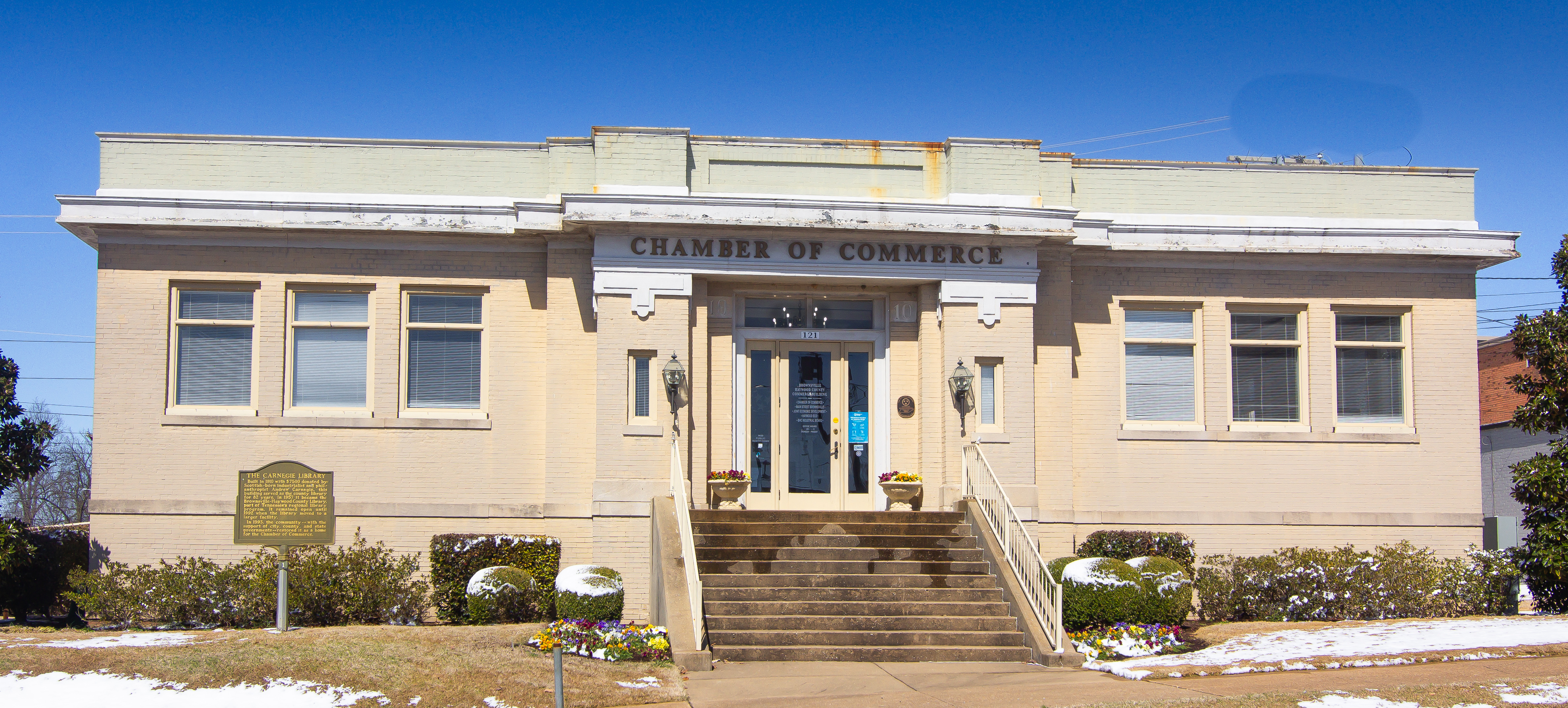

- Location within Tennessee
- Location: 121 W Main St., Brownsville, Tennessee
- Coordinates: 35°35′38″N 89°15′49″W
- MPS: McKissack and McKissack Buildings TR
- NRHP reference No.: 100002752
- Added to NRHP: July 26, 2018

The Brownsville Carnegie Library, located at 121 W Main St. in Brownsville, Tennessee, United States, was listed on the National Register of Historic Places in 2018.

It is a Carnegie library, funded by a $7,500 grant December 2, 1909. It was built between 1910-1912 and was operated as a library from 1912 to 2002. It was renovated in 1993. It is now used as a Chamber of Commerce building. It was possibly designed by Neander M. Woods, Jr. of Memphis.
