= Stanton, Tennessee =

- Town
- Location of Stanton in Haywood County, Tennessee.
- Coordinates: 35°27′45″N 89°24′5″W
- Country: United States
- State: Tennessee
- County: Haywood

Government
  - Type: Mayor-aldermanic
  - Mayor: Norman Bauer, Jr.

Area
  - Total: 0.52 sq mi (1.34 km^{2})
  - Land: 0.52 sq mi (1.34 km^{2})
  - Water: 0 sq mi (0.00 km^{2})
- Elevation: 315 ft (96 m)

Population (2020)
  - Total: 417
  - Density: 807.9/sq mi (311.93/km^{2})
- Time zone: UTC-6 (Central (CST))
  - Summer (DST): UTC-5 (CDT)
- ZIP code: 38069
- Area code: 731
- FIPS code: 47-70820
- GNIS feature ID: 1303800
- Website: stantontn.gov

Stanton is a town in Haywood County, Tennessee. As of 2024, Stanton had a population of 704 according to the United States Census Bureau.

== Geography ==
Stanton is located at 35°27′45″N 89°24′5″W (35.462463, -89.401253).

According to the United States Census Bureau, the town has a total area of 0.5 square miles (1.3 km^{2}), all land.

== History ==
Joseph Blackwell Stanton purchased the land that is now the town of Stanton in the early 1830s for roughly $3.50 per acre. Stanton used his influence in the area to ensure the railroad line ran through his land, and thereafter numerous families moved to the community from the nearby Wesley community some four miles to the west. Initial businesses in the area were a depot operated by Corydon Spencer and a store operated by F.W. Chaney, who also served as the small town's first postmaster. Stanton passed soon after this influx of population, and his property passed to his daughter, the wife of Colonel Nathan Adams of the 254th Transportation Battalion. The couple began selling lots in town and saw many of the remaining businesses and homes of Wesley move to Stanton. Mrs. Adams was a staunch prohibitionist and ensured the establishment of a clause barring the sale of whiskey in the town. A now defunct hotel was housed in the downtown area soon after, along with the establishment of the Baptist church being built on land granted by Chaney. This church housed the town's first school. The Methodist church was later built on land given by a Mr. Somervell, consisting of the congregation from Wesley's Methodist church. The Presbyterian church was built in 1872 and the Church of Christ was established in 1952. The Masonic Lodge was constructed in 1871, with the top floor being used by the Masons while the bottom floor operated as a school.

Stanton provided many soldiers to the Confederate Army during the Civil War. During the war, Union general W. H. L. Wallace and his troops camped near the property of Corydon Spencer, before being fired upon by secessionist troops. In retaliation, Wallace is said to have given the order to raze the town, but was talked down by Spencer. Despite this aversion, the town faced two disastrous fires in the coming years. In 1874 a fire destroyed the lower part of the business section, much of which was rebuilt in brick. The other section, however, was not updated alongside these renovations and was itself destroyed in large part during a fire in 1922. The town also suffered during the Lower Mississippi Valley yellow fever epidemic of 1878. While facing minimal fatalities due to the epidemic, mass hysteria ensued and many families fled the area. One notable fatality was John J. Ashe, a former Stanton resident who had since moved to Memphis, who had come back to the town to nurse the sick. Ashe had previously been arrested, and later cleared, on charges relating to complicity in the assassination of Abraham Lincoln. Shortly before the assassination, Ashe had sent a postcard stating that Lincoln "... ought to be killed" which he sent through the mail.

Following these hardships, the town recovered and continued to grow, seeing many new homes and businesses built. In 1927 the town was formally incorporated into Haywood County. The town had previously petitioned for incorporation in the 1880s but this charter would ultimately be abolished.

== Demographics ==
Historical population
Census	Pop.	Note	%±
1880	254		—
1890	250		−1.6%
1930	503		—
1940	500		−0.6%
1950	503		0.6%
1960	458		−8.9%
1970	372		−18.8%
1980	540		45.2%
1990	487		−9.8%
2000	615		26.3%
2010	452		−26.5%
2020	417		−7.7%

=== 2020 census ===
Stanton town, Tennessee – Racial and ethnic composition Note: the US Census treats Hispanic/Latino as an ethnic category. This table excludes Latinos from the racial categories and assigns them to a separate category. Hispanics/Latinos may be of any race.
Race / Ethnicity (NH = Non-Hispanic)	Pop 2000	Pop 2010	Pop 2020	% 2000	% 2010	% 2020
White alone (NH)	196	133	121	31.87%	29.42%	29.02%
Black or African American alone (NH)	414	314	286	67.32%	69.47%	68.59%
Native American or Alaska Native alone (NH)	1	1	3	0.16%	0.22%	0.72%
Asian alone (NH)	0	0	1	0.00%	0.00%	0.24%
Pacific Islander alone (NH)	1	0	0	0.16%	0.00%	0.00%
Some Other Race alone (NH)	0	0	0	0.00%	0.00%	0.00%
Mixed race or Multiracial (NH)	0	2	4	0.00%	0.44%	0.96%
Hispanic or Latino (any race)	3	2	2	0.49%	0.44%	0.48%
Total	615	452	417	100.00%	100.00%	100.00%

=== 2000 Census ===
As of the census of 2000, there were 615 people, 254 households, and 167 families residing in the town. The population density was 1,191.3 inhabitants per square mile (460.0/km^{2}). There were 283 housing units at an average density of 548.2 per square mile (211.7/km^{2}). The racial makeup of the town was 67.80% African American, 31.00% whites 0.16% Native American and 0.16% Pacific Islander. Hispanic or Latino of any race were 0.49% of the population.

There were 254 households, out of which 39.4% had children under the age of 18 living with them, 26.8% were married couples living together, 35.8% had a female householder with no husband present, and 33.9% were non-families. 30.3% of all households were made up of individuals, and 10.6% had someone living alone who was 65 years of age or older. The average household size was 2.42 and the average family size was 2.98.

In the town, the population was spread out, with 32.5% under the age of 18, 9.8% from 18 to 24, 27.5% from 25 to 44, 18.2% from 45 to 64, and 12.0% who were 65 years of age or older. The median age was 30 years. For every 100 females, there were 80.4 males. For every 100 females age 18 and over, there were 60.9 males.

The median income for a household in the town was $17,422, and the median income for a family was $18,229. Males had a median income of $30,000 versus $19,583 for females. The per capita income for the town was $13,888. About 36.5% of families and 40.9% of the population were below the poverty line, including 51.4% of those under age 18 and 36.8% of those age 65 or over.

Joseph Boyd Rives (1888-1955) lived here before moving to Rossville, Tennessee. There he started Rossville Savings Bank. This was purchased by Somerville Bank and Trust. Later Somerville Bank and Trust was purchased by Trustmark National Bank.

== Economy ==
A 3,836-acre (1,552 ha) tract in southwestern Haywood County near Stanton has been designated for a state-supported industrial "megasite," intended for a large-scale industrial or business development such as an automobile assembly plant. In September 2009, Tennessee's State Building Commission authorized spending of $40 million for purchase of the land.

On September 27, 2021, it was announced that Ford and SK Innovation would construct a complex at the megasite called "Blue Oval City" to manufacture electric vehicles and batteries. The facility, which is expected to be operational in 2025, will cost approximately $5.6 billion, making it the most expensive single investment in state history, and employ approximately 5,700.
