= Haywood County, Tennessee =

County in Tennessee, United States

- County
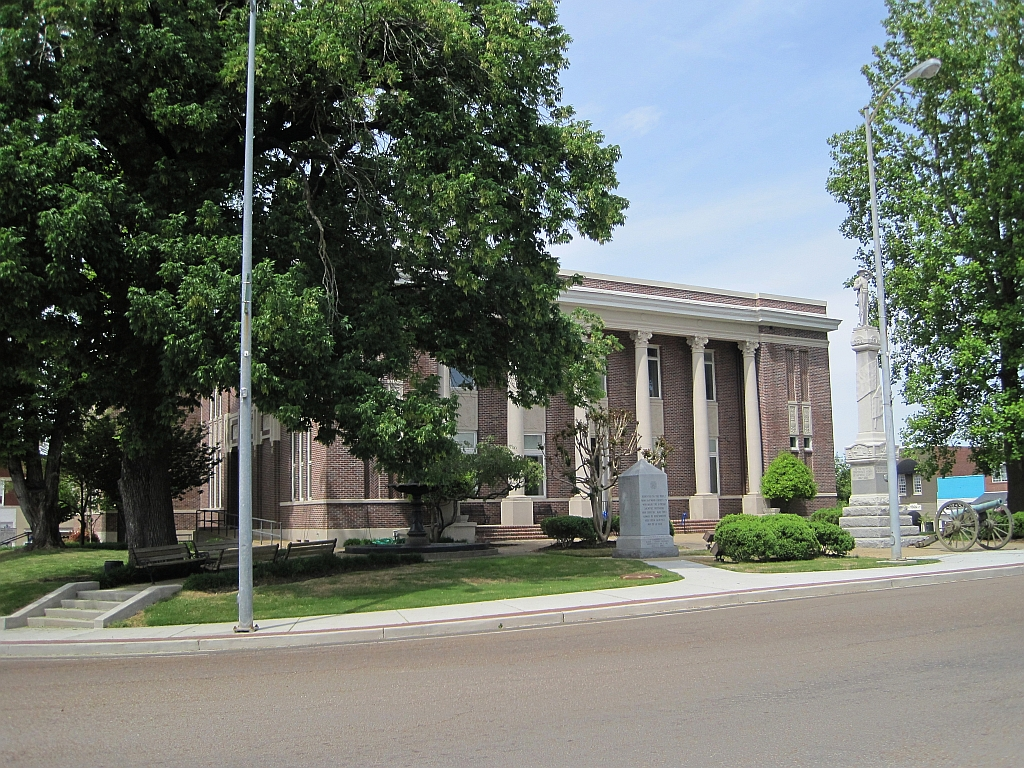
- Haywood County Courthouse

- Location within the U.S. state of Tennessee
- Coordinates: 35°35′N 89°17′W
- Country: United States
- State: Tennessee
- Founded: 1823
- Named for: John Haywood
- Seat: Brownsville
- Largest city: Brownsville

Government
  - Mayor: David Livingston

Area
  - Total: 534 sq mi (1,380 km^{2})
  - Land: 533 sq mi (1,380 km^{2})
  - Water: 0.9 sq mi (2.3 km^{2}) 0.2%

Population (2020)
  - Total: 17,864
  - Estimate (2025): 17,042 ▼
  - Density: 33.5/sq mi (12.9/km^{2})
- Time zone: UTC−6 (Central)
  - Summer (DST): UTC−5 (CDT)
- Congressional district: 8th
- Website: https://haywoodtn.gov/

Haywood County is a county located in the U.S. state of Tennessee, in the region known as West Tennessee. As of the 2020 census, the population was 17,864. Its county seat and largest city is Brownsville. It is one of only two remaining counties in Tennessee, along with Shelby County, with a majority African-American population.

== History ==
Haywood County was created from part of Madison County in 1823–24, and was named for Tennessee judge and historian John Haywood. The state legislature designated Brownsville as the county seat. Haywood County was later reduced in size, both in 1835 when a western portion was ceded to help form Lauderdale County, and in 1870 when all Haywood County territory north of the Forked Deer River, save one small district, was given to the newly formed Crockett County.

For much of the county's history, agriculture, primarily cotton production, was the basis of the local economy, as it was throughout western Tennessee. Before the Civil War, this was accomplished by a plantation system based on the use of enslaved African-American workers.

After Emancipation in 1865, many planters hired freedmen as tenant farmers and sharecroppers to produce the still-important cotton crops. The largely rural county continues to have a majority-Black population.

Whites lynched three African-Americans in the county, most at the county seat of Brownsville, in the period following Reconstruction and into the early 20th century.

On June 20, 1940, Elbert Williams, an African American, was murdered in Brownsville for "attempting to qualify to vote" and "an interest in Negro affairs." His body was thrown into the Hatchie River, and was later recovered. He had organized a local chapter of the NAACP (National Association for the Advancement of Colored People). He was the last recorded lynching victim in the state. Like other southern states, Tennessee had raised voter registration barriers at the turn of the century to disenfranchise Blacks.

== Geography ==
According to the U.S. Census Bureau, the county has a total area of 534 square miles (1,380 km^{2}), of which 533 square miles (1,380 km^{2}) is land and 0.9 square miles (2.3 km^{2}) (0.2%) is water.

Haywood County is situated on the southeastern edge of the New Madrid Seismic Zone, an area with a high earthquake risk.

=== Adjacent counties ===
- Crockett County (north)
- Madison County (east)
- Hardeman County (southeast)
- Fayette County (south)
- Tipton County (west)
- Lauderdale County (northwest)

=== National protected area ===
- Hatchie National Wildlife Refuge

== Demographics ==
Since 1940, the county population has generally declined. Many Black Americans left after confrontations and the murder of Elbert Williams in 1940 related to Black attempts to register to vote. In addition, mechanization of agriculture reduced the need for farm workers, and other African-Americans left as part of the second wave of the Great Migration.

Historical population
Census	Pop.	Note	%±
1830	5,334		—
1840	13,870		160.0%
1850	17,259		24.4%
1860	19,232		11.4%
1870	25,094		30.5%
1880	26,053		3.8%
1890	23,558		−9.6%
1900	25,189		6.9%
1910	25,910		2.9%
1920	25,386		−2.0%
1930	26,063		2.7%
1940	27,699		6.3%
1950	26,212		−5.4%
1960	23,393		−10.8%
1970	19,596		−16.2%
1980	20,318		3.7%
1990	19,437		−4.3%
2000	19,797		1.9%
2010	18,787		−5.1%
2020	17,864		−4.9%
2025 (est.)	17,042	▼	−4.6%
U.S. Decennial Census; 1790–1960 1900–1990; 1990–2000 2010–2014

=== Racial and ethnic composition ===
Haywood County, Tennessee – Racial and ethnic composition Note: the US Census treats Hispanic/Latino as an ethnic category. This table excludes Latinos from the racial categories and assigns them to a separate category. Hispanics/Latinos may be of any race.
Race / ethnicity (NH = Non-Hispanic)	Pop 1980	Pop 1990	Pop 2000	Pop 2010	Pop 2020	% 1980	% 1990	% 2000	% 2010	% 2020
White alone (NH)	9,825	9,621	9,088	8,419	7,554	48.36%	49.50%	45.91%	44.81%	42.29%
Black or African American alone (NH)	10,213	9,620	10,066	9,431	8,993	50.27%	49.49%	50.85%	50.20%	50.34%
Native American or Alaska Native alone (NH)	3	24	18	25	33	0.01%	0.12%	0.09%	0.13%	0.18%
Asian alone (NH)	7	13	18	21	26	0.03%	0.07%	0.09%	0.11%	0.15%
Native Hawaiian or Pacific Islander alone (NH)	x	x	3	0	6	x	x	0.02%	0.00%	0.03%
Other race alone (NH)	2	3	3	21	56	0.01%	0.02%	0.02%	0.11%	0.31%
Mixed race or Multiracial (NH)	x	x	77	147	358	x	x	0.39%	0.78%	2.00%
Hispanic or Latino (any race)	268	156	524	723	838	1.32%	0.80%	2.65%	3.85%	4.69%
Total	20,318	19,437	19,797	18,787	17,864	100.00%	100.00%	100.00%	100.00%	100.00%

=== 2020 census ===
As of the 2020 census, there were 17,864 people and 7,424 households in the county, of which 4,727 were families. The median age was 42.8 years.

22.5% of residents were under the age of 18 and 19.5% of residents were 65 years of age or older. For every 100 females there were 87.7 males, and for every 100 females age 18 and over there were 84.9 males.

The racial makeup of the county was 43.1% White, 50.6% Black or African American, 0.3% American Indian and Alaska Native, 0.1% Asian, 0.1% Native Hawaiian and Pacific Islander, 2.9% from some other race, and 2.9% from two or more races. Hispanic or Latino residents of any race comprised 4.7% of the population.

53.9% of residents lived in urban areas, while 46.1% lived in rural areas.

There were 7,424 households in the county, of which 29.5% had children under the age of 18 living in them. Of all households, 38.0% were married-couple households, 19.3% were households with a male householder and no spouse or partner present, and 37.6% were households with a female householder and no spouse or partner present. About 30.4% of all households were made up of individuals and 13.6% had someone living alone who was 65 years of age or older.

There were 8,240 housing units, of which 9.9% were vacant. Among occupied housing units, 61.0% were owner-occupied and 39.0% were renter-occupied. The homeowner vacancy rate was 1.6% and the rental vacancy rate was 8.4%.

=== 2010 census ===
As of the 2010 United States census, 18,787 people were living in the county. 50.4% were Black or African American, 45.9% White, 0.2% Native American, 0.1% Asian, 2.5% of some other race, and 0.9% of two or more races. 3.8% were Hispanic or Latino of any race.

=== 2000 census ===
As of the census of 2000, there were 19,797 people, 7,558 households, and 5,419 families living in the county. The population density was 37 people per square mile (14 people/km^{2}). There were 8,086 housing units at an average density of 15 units per square mile (5.8/km^{2}). The racial makeup of the county was 51.05% Black or African American, 46.73% White, 0.12% Native American, 0.09% Asian, 0.05% Pacific Islander, 1.38% from other races, and 0.58% from two or more races. 2.65% of the population were Hispanic or Latino of any race. Haywood and Shelby Counties are the only counties in Tennessee with a Black majority.

There were 7,558 households, out of which 33.40% had children under the age of 18 living with them, 45.80% were married couples living together, 22.00% had a female householder with no husband present, and 28.30% were non-families. 25.40% of all households were made up of individuals, and 11.10% had someone living alone who was 65 years of age or older. The average household size was 2.59 and the average family size was 3.09.

In the county, the population was spread out, with 27.20% under the age of 18, 9.80% from 18 to 24, 27.30% from 25 to 44, 21.90% from 45 to 64, and 13.80% who were 65 years of age or older. The median age was 35 years. For every 100 females, there were 87.80 males. For every 100 females age 18 and over, there were 82.40 males.

The median income for a household in the county was $27,671, and the median income for a family was $32,597. Males had a median income of $27,333 versus $21,361 for females. The per capita income for the county was $14,669. About 16.30% of families and 19.50% of the population were below the poverty line, including 24.00% of those under age 18 and 25.70% of those age 65 or over.

== Economy ==
The largest industry in Haywood County is agriculture. Haywood County grows more cotton than any other county in Tennessee and produced 189,000 bales in 2003 on 103,000 acres (420 km^{2}). Soybeans were the county's secondary crop, followed by corn. Agriculture and other related businesses contributed more than $130 million to the Haywood County economy in 2004. By 2017, grains, oilseeds, drybeans, drypeas and tobacco drew the most income, but Haywood County still grew the most cotton in the state.

In 2009, under the leadership of Tennessee Governor Phil Bredesen and Haywood County Mayor Franklin Smith, a 3,836-acre (1,552 ha) tract in southwestern Haywood County near Stanton was designated for a state-supported industrial megasite, intended for a large-scale industrial or business development such as an automobile assembly plant. In September 2009, Tennessee's State Building Commission authorized spending of $40 million for purchase of the land. On September 27, 2021, it was announced that Ford and SK Innovation would construct a complex at the megasite called "Blue Oval City" to manufacture electric vehicles and batteries. The facility, which is expected to be operational in 2025, will cost approximately $5.6 billion, making it the most expensive single investment in state history, and employ approximately 5,700.

== Communities ==
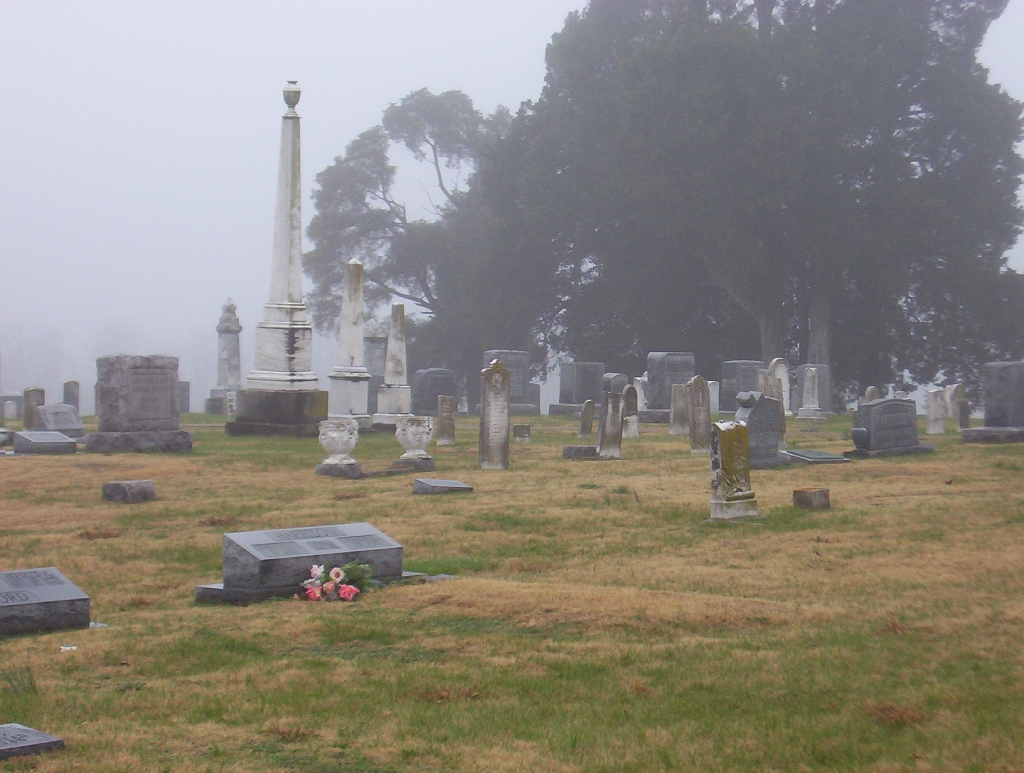
Trinity Cemetery in Nutbush provides a final resting place for more than 50 Civil War soldiers.

=== City ===
- Brownsville (county seat)

=== Town ===
- Stanton

=== Census-designated place ===
- Dancyville

=== Unincorporated communities ===
- Allen Station
- Asbury
- Belle Eagle
- Christmasville
- Cliff Creek
- Eurekaton
- Hillville
- Jones Station
- Keeling
- Nutbush
- Rudolph
- Tabernacle
- Tibbs
- Woodland

== Notable residents ==
One of Haywood County's most notable residents was Sleepy John Estes, a blues guitarist songwriter and vocalist. Born in 1899 or 1900 in Ripley, Tennessee, he lived most of his life in Brownsville. He died on June 5, 1977, in Brownsville. Sleepy John is buried at Elam Baptist Church Cemetery in Durhamville, Lauderdale County.

Other notable county residents include:

- Tony Delk, a first round NBA draft pick spent his adolescent years in Brownsville.
- Hambone Willie Newbern, blues musician from the Brownsville area
- Singer Tina Turner spent her childhood in Nutbush, Haywood County. Her song "Nutbush City Limits" was based on the town.
- Elbert Williams, voting rights activist

== Politics ==
Haywood County has recently been recognized as competitive county politically. The county has been depopulating, similar to some other rural Black Belt counties. In most presidential elections, Haywood has supported Democratic candidates. In 2024, however, Democrat Kamala Harris defeated Donald Trump by just 25 votes. This was the smallest margin of victory by a Democrat in the county since the 1972 landslide reelection of Richard Nixon, the last time a Republican carried Haywood County.

Republicans have gained more momentum in the county in recent years, with them electing county mayor David Livingston in 2018 and re-electing him in 2022. He had a high-profile endorsement from Republican U.S. Senator Marsha Blackburn. Republican Governor Bill Lee won the county in his 2022 re-election bid and Marsha Blackburn won the county in her 2024 re-election bid as well.

=== Haywood County mayoral elections ===
2018 Haywood County mayoral election results
Party	Candidate	Votes	%
Nonpartisan	David Livingston	1,801	39.34%
Nonpartisan	Clinton Neal	1,211	26.45%
Nonpartisan	Sheronda Green	1,079	23.57%
Nonpartisan	Angella Palmer-Banks	415	9.07%
Nonpartisan	Chris Chapman	72	1.57%
Total votes		4,578	100.00%

2022 Haywood County mayoral election results
Party	Candidate	Votes	%
Nonpartisan	David Livingston (Incumbent)	1,483	44.02%
Nonpartisan	Joe Stephens	1,324	39.30%
Nonpartisan	Cheryl Cole	562	16.68%
Total votes		3,369	100.00%

United States presidential election results for Haywood County, Tennessee
Year	Republican		Democratic		Third party(ies)	
Year	No.	%	No.	%	No.	%
1912	34	2.79%	1,069	87.69%	116	9.52%
1916	61	3.49%	1,677	95.88%	11	0.63%
1920	101	4.64%	2,068	95.04%	7	0.32%
1924	60	3.08%	1,872	96.15%	15	0.77%
1928	178	8.08%	2,024	91.92%	0	0.00%
1932	77	4.09%	1,788	95.01%	17	0.90%
1936	29	1.65%	1,725	98.23%	2	0.11%
1940	128	3.56%	3,466	96.33%	4	0.11%
1944	208	7.61%	2,525	92.36%	1	0.04%
1948	148	6.95%	1,050	49.32%	931	43.73%
1952	940	27.80%	2,432	71.93%	9	0.27%
1956	516	17.04%	2,217	73.22%	295	9.74%
1960	1,188	35.63%	1,867	56.00%	279	8.37%
1964	2,407	51.25%	2,290	48.75%	0	0.00%
1968	1,152	20.51%	1,709	30.42%	2,757	49.07%
1972	3,123	59.45%	1,966	37.43%	164	3.12%
1976	1,952	34.48%	3,681	65.02%	28	0.49%
1980	2,435	40.97%	3,445	57.97%	63	1.06%
1984	2,839	46.04%	3,308	53.65%	19	0.31%
1988	2,687	47.64%	2,923	51.83%	30	0.53%
1992	2,518	39.49%	3,511	55.07%	347	5.44%
1996	2,293	38.03%	3,565	59.12%	172	2.85%
2000	2,554	39.43%	3,887	60.00%	37	0.57%
2004	3,140	41.60%	4,359	57.75%	49	0.65%
2008	3,165	38.97%	4,893	60.25%	63	0.78%
2012	2,960	39.11%	4,569	60.36%	40	0.53%
2016	3,013	44.09%	3,711	54.30%	110	1.61%
2020	3,343	44.94%	4,012	53.93%	84	1.13%
2024	3,286	49.40%	3,311	49.77%	55	0.83%

== See also ==
- National Register of Historic Places listings in Haywood County, Tennessee
