= Brownsville, Tennessee =

- City
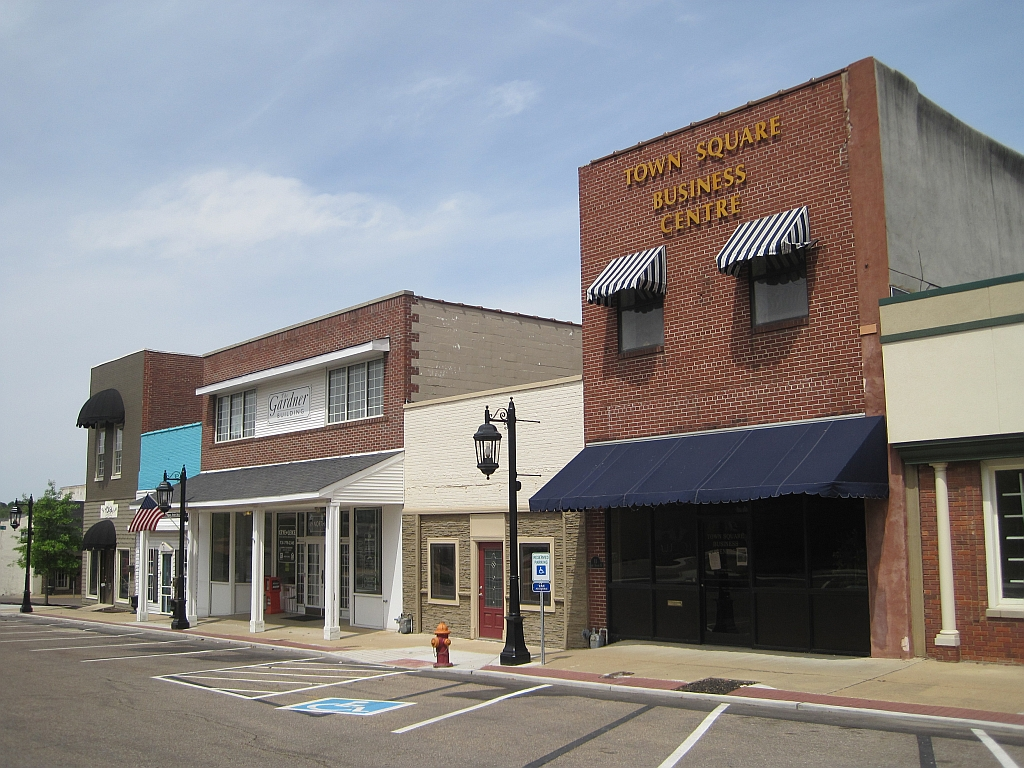
- Brownsville business district

- Flag Seal
- Motto: Heart of the Tennessee Delta
- Location in Haywood County, Tennessee
- Coordinates: 35°35′26″N 89°15′39″W
- Country: United States
- State: Tennessee
- County: Haywood

Government
  - Mayor: William D.Rawls, Jr.
  - Vice Mayor: Carolyn Flagg

Area
  - Total: 9.86 sq mi (25.54 km^{2})
  - Land: 9.86 sq mi (25.54 km^{2})
  - Water: 0 sq mi (0.00 km^{2})
- Elevation: 390 ft (119 m)

Population (2020)
  - Total: 9,788
  - Density: 993/sq mi (383.3/km^{2})
- Time zone: UTC-6 (Central (CST))
  - Summer (DST): UTC-5 (CDT)
- ZIP code: 38012
- Area code: 731
- FIPS code: 47-08920
- GNIS feature ID: 1278634
- Website: brownsvilletn.gov

Brownsville is a city in and the county seat of Haywood County, Tennessee, United States. Its population as of the 2020 census was 9,788. The city is named after General Jacob Jennings Brown, an American officer of the War of 1812.

== History ==
Brownsville was a trading center that developed in association with cotton plantations and commodity agriculture in the lowlying Delta of the Mississippi River around Memphis, Tennessee and West Tennessee. It is located north of the Hatchie River, a tributary of the Mississippi, which originally served as the main transportation routes to markets for cotton. The land was developed by planters for cotton plantations and worked by large numbers of enslaved persons of African ancestry, who made up a majority of the town and county population.

=== Early history and settlers ===
Brownsville was designated the county seat of Haywood County by the legislature on October, 16, 1824, and the town was legally incorporated in 1826. The town was named for General Jacob Jennings Brown due to a local legend that he has established a trading post just southeast of what is now the town square prior to the treaty with the Chickasaw people allowing settlement in Western Tennessee. Fifty acres of land were deeded for Brownsville on December, 14 1825 for a sum of one dollar and the choice of lots. By 1832, Brownsville had grown to a population of 400. The town continued to flourish until the major financial depression of 1837. Only two of the town's ten stores survived this period. During this time, the area was also struck with repeated flooding and a number of earthquakes.

Bradford's Landing was founded in 1824 by brothers Hiram and Miles Bradford. Hiram would later establish the first cotton gin and store in Brownsville in 1825. This storefront was later purchased by early Jewish settler Emil Tamm, and operated as Emil Tamm & Sons Department Store for 96 years.

The Tabernacle Campground was founded in 1826 by Reverend Howell Lewis Taylor and his five sons. This settlement contained Haywood County's first schoolhouse. It now serves as the site of an annual camp meeting for over 700 descendants of Taylor.

James Bond arrived in Brownsville in 1836 and acted as a benefactor for many of the city's institutions. Bond owned in excess of 17,000 acres in Haywood County alone and owned as many as 600 slaves. He provided the land for the establishment of both Brownsville Baptist Female College in 1850 and Brownsville Baptist Church in 1870. He also invested heavily in various mercantile ventures in Brownsville and the Memphis and Ohio Railroad, which would connect Haywood County to Memphis upon its completion. During the Union occupation of Haywood County in June 1862, Bond swore loyalty to the Union.

One of Brownsville's earliest Jewish settlers was Jacob Felsenthal, who arrived in the United States in 1840 from Bavaria. He arrived in Brownsville in 1847 and opened a retail store by the name of Felsenthal Bros. and Sons. This store would later be renamed Felsenthal's Department Store and served the community until it was destroyed by a fire in 1980.

In the mid to late 19th century, German Jewish immigrants also settled in Brownsville. They founded a congregation in the 1860s, and built Temple Adas Israel in 1882. It is listed on the National Register of Historic Places. The building is believed to be the oldest synagogue in Tennessee, and is a rare example of a synagogue built in the Gothic Revival style.

The town is notable for its many well-preserved homes owned by wealthy planters before the Civil War, and multi-generational family-owned farms. Notable among these include James Bond's home, which was moved to nearby Dyersburg in 1975, the Eader House, constructed in 1865, which is now used as an event venue, Lucerne, a former plantation, constructed in 1855, which is now on the National Register of Historic Places, and the Joshua K. Hutchison House, also on the National Register of Historic Places.

=== Civil War ===
The Haywood Blues were organized in Brownsville in spring 1861, consisting of approximately 100 men and captained by G.C. Porter. This company was mustered into service in May 1861 and was assigned as Company A of the 6th Tennessee Infantry. This regiment, and likewise Company A, fought in the battles of Shiloh, Perryville, Stones River, Chickamauga, Franklin, Nashville, and took part in the Atlanta campaign. They were surrendered to United States forces in North Carolina.

The Haywood Rifles were also organized in Brownsville in spring 1861. The company consisted of around 100 men with Robert S. Russell served as captain. In May 1861 they were assigned their position as Company B of the 9th Tennessee Infantry.

Company L of the 7th Tennessee Cavalry of the Confederate Army was organized in Brownsville in April 1862. Upon organization, James Allen Taylor served as captain, Alex Duckworth served as first lieutenant, and Frank Pugh served as third lieutenant.The unit consisted of roughly another 65 non-commissioned officers and privates. The company remained in Brownsville until May 12, 1862, when they were ordered to report to Fort Pillow, staying there until the fort's fall, and then were ordered to report to Colonel William Hicks Jackson. In the fall of 1862, Taylor resigned as captain citing ill health and thus Duckworth was made captain in spring 1863. They continued under this regiment until the end of the war, when it was surrendered by Nathan Bedford Forrest in May 1865. Brownsville and Haywood County produced many other companies to the secessionist army, including two to the 7th Cavalry, two to the 14th Cavalry, three to the 15th Cavalry, and four to the 9th Infantry.

Following President Abraham Lincoln's Emancipation Proclamation, a known 112 African Americans of Brownsville and Haywood County joined the Union Army across 20 different regiments, primarily the 3rd Regiment Heavy Artillery USCT and the 4th Regiment Heavy Artillery USCT. In addition, the area also produced one dedicated unit for the Union Army, a company for the 13th Cavalry. Another company of about 60 men was raised for the Union in Haywood County by Captain J.L. Poston. The majority of these men were killed during the Fort Pillow massacre. Despite the formation of these units and numerous prominent Unionists in the area at the time, a monument dedicated solely to the Confederate dead was erected in 1909. There have since been calls to see the monuments removal, but no action has been taken by the county.

Numerous notable Brownsville residents fought in the conflict

- Alsey Hugh Bradford, member of the school board and son of the above mentioned Hiram Bradford, was a colonel in the 31st Tennessee Infantry for the Confederacy
- Hiram Bradford, was a lieutenant colonel in the Confederate Army
- William Lafayette Duckworth, physician and Methodist minister, was a colonel in his brother's 7th Tennessee Cavalry
- Charles Eader, brother of Jonathan Eader, was killed in the Battle of Gettysburg while fighting for the Union
- Jonathan Eader, owner of the Eader House and one of the founders of the Wesleyan Female College, was a member of the above mentioned Duckworth's Cavalry
- Isaac Felsenthal, brother of Jacob Felsenthal, was killed at the Battle of Shiloh while serving in Nathan Bedford Forrest's cavalry
- Moses Felsenthal, brother of Jacob Felsenthal and the above Isaac Felsenthal, was a taken prisoner as a member of Nathan Bedford Forrest's cavalry
- Joseph Felsenthal, brother of Jacob, Isaac, and Moses Felsenthal, was a member of Nathan Bedford Forrest's cavalry
- Benjamin J. Lea, later Attorney General of Tennessee, was a colonel in the Confederacy's 52nd Tennessee Infantry
- George C. Porter, state senator, was a colonel in the Confederacy's 6th Tennessee Infantry
- Robert V. Richardson, Brownsville attorney, was a brigadier general in the Confederate Army

=== Reconstruction ===
Through the late 19th century, whites worked to re-establish supremacy after Reconstruction and impose Jim Crow and second-class status on African Americans. Tennessee effectively disenfranchised most blacks in the state after the turn of the 20th century, excluding them from the political system and destroying what had been a competitive system. The state's congressional delegation and elected officials became predominantly white Democrats with the exception of East Tennessee, where white Republicans formed the majority. The region of yeomen farmers had been mostly Unionist-leaning during the Civil War.

Brownsville was struck by the yellow fever epidemic of 1878. The city saw 844 reported cases of the disease and suffered more than 200 deaths. Members of the Howard Association supplied much needed assistance to Brownsville during this time. Many victims of the epidemic were buried in Brownsville's Oakwood Cemetery. Due to the limited workforce available to bury each victim individually, several of them were buried in an unmarked mass grave.

=== Lynchings ===
From the late 19th into the early 20th century, whites lynched three African-American men in Brownsville, two in the 20th century.

In 1939, with Haywood County's black majority disenfranchised, a number of blacks in Brownsville founded a local NAACP chapter. They worked to assert their right to register and vote in the presidential election of 1940. In June 1940 threats were made against the group, and Elisha Davis was kidnapped by a large white mob. They demanded the names of NAACP members and their plans. He fled town, followed by his family, losing his successful service station and all their property.

On June 20, 1940, Elbert Williams, secretary of the NAACP chapter, and Elisha's brother Thomas Davis were questioned by police. Thomas Davis was released, but Williams was never seen alive again. His body was found in the Hatchie River a few days later, with bullet holes in his chest. He is considered to be the first NAACP member to have been lynched for civil rights activities; he is the last recorded lynching victim in the state. Several other NAACP members were run out of town by police, fearing for their lives.

Thurgood Marshall of the NAACP conducted an investigation of Williams' murder and appealed to the Department of Justice to prosecute the case, providing affidavits of witnesses. FBI agents were sent to the town in September to protect blacks wanting to register to vote, but the local people were fearful because there had been no prosecution of Williams' killers. In October 1940, The Crisis, the magazine of the NAACP, reported that no blacks registered to vote. Thomas Davis and his family moved North and resettled in Niles, Michigan. The DOJ closed the Williams case in 1942.

In 2015, a historical marker honoring Elbert Williams was dedicated in Brownsville.

== Geography ==
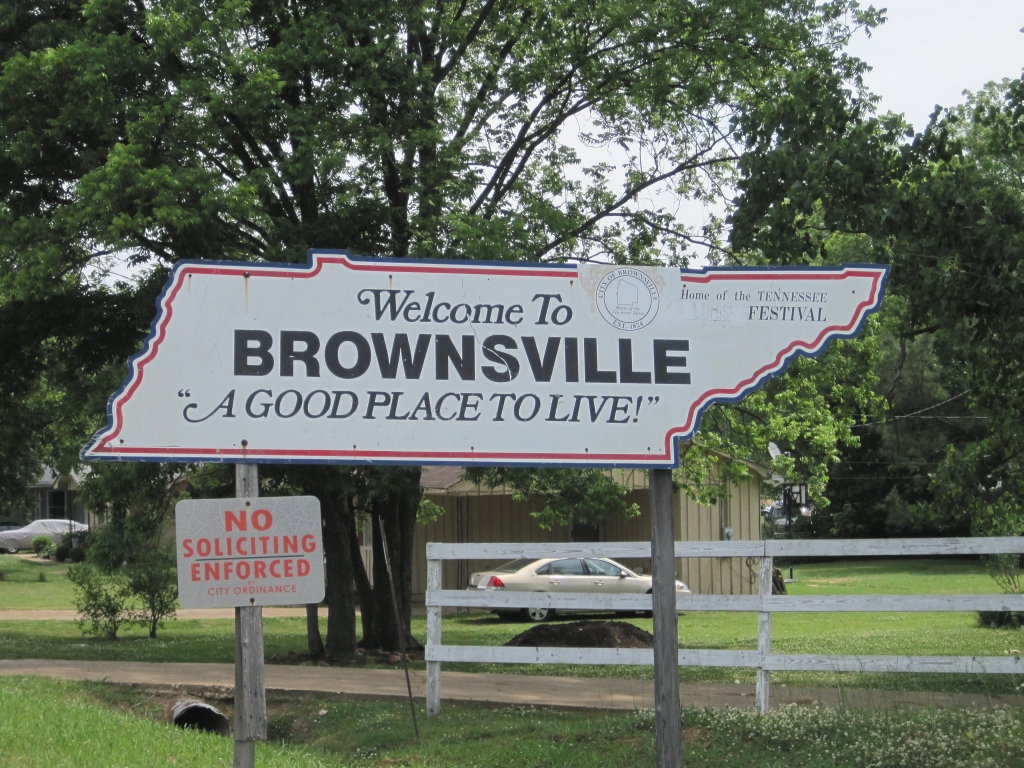
Brownsville welcome sign

Brownsville is located in central Haywood County. According to the United States Census Bureau, the city has a total area of 10.2 square miles (26.4 km^{2}), all land. U.S. Routes 70 and 79 form a bypass around the southern and eastern sides of the city. US 79 leads northeast 25 miles (40 km) to Humboldt, while US 70 leads east 26 miles (42 km) to Jackson. The two highways together lead southwest 57 miles (92 km) to Memphis. Interstate 40 passes south of Brownsville, coming closest at exits 56 and 60, where it is four miles (6 km) south of downtown.

Brownsville is situated on the southeastern edge of the New Madrid Seismic Zone, an area with a high earthquake risk.

The Hatchie River passes south of Brownsville. It is the longest free-flowing tributary of the lower Mississippi, and contains the largest forested floodplain in Tennessee. The river is home to hundreds of species of fish, including 11 species of catfish, and the alligator snapping turtle. The Hatchie River was named by the Nature Conservancy as one of the "great places" to save. The Hatchie is designated as a "scenic river" under the Tennessee Wild and Scenic Rivers Act.

=== Climate ===
The climate in this area is characterized by hot, humid summers and generally mild to cool winters. According to the Köppen Climate Classification system, Brownsville has a humid subtropical climate, abbreviated "Cfa" on climate maps.

Climate data for Brownsville, Tennessee (1991–2020 normals, extremes 1895–present)
Month	Jan	Feb	Mar	Apr	May	Jun	Jul	Aug	Sep	Oct	Nov	Dec	Year
Record high °F (°C)	79 (26)	83 (28)	92 (33)	92 (33)	98 (37)	108 (42)	109 (43)	108 (42)	108 (42)	97 (36)	88 (31)	80 (27)	109 (43)
Mean maximum °F (°C)	68.9 (20.5)	72.6 (22.6)	79.8 (26.6)	85.4 (29.7)	89.8 (32.1)	94.9 (34.9)	97.2 (36.2)	97.3 (36.3)	93.7 (34.3)	87.0 (30.6)	78.2 (25.7)	70.2 (21.2)	98.9 (37.2)
Mean daily maximum °F (°C)	48.1 (8.9)	52.9 (11.6)	61.8 (16.6)	72.0 (22.2)	80.3 (26.8)	87.6 (30.9)	90.7 (32.6)	90.1 (32.3)	84.6 (29.2)	73.8 (23.2)	61.2 (16.2)	51.4 (10.8)	71.2 (21.8)
Daily mean °F (°C)	39.0 (3.9)	43.1 (6.2)	51.4 (10.8)	61.0 (16.1)	70.2 (21.2)	77.8 (25.4)	81.0 (27.2)	79.9 (26.6)	73.4 (23.0)	61.9 (16.6)	50.5 (10.3)	42.3 (5.7)	61.0 (16.1)
Mean daily minimum °F (°C)	29.9 (−1.2)	33.3 (0.7)	41.0 (5.0)	50.0 (10.0)	60.1 (15.6)	68.1 (20.1)	71.3 (21.8)	69.6 (20.9)	62.2 (16.8)	50.0 (10.0)	39.7 (4.3)	33.1 (0.6)	50.7 (10.4)
Mean minimum °F (°C)	12.9 (−10.6)	17.5 (−8.1)	23.5 (−4.7)	33.5 (0.8)	45.1 (7.3)	57.2 (14.0)	63.2 (17.3)	60.1 (15.6)	47.0 (8.3)	34.5 (1.4)	24.4 (−4.2)	18.5 (−7.5)	11.0 (−11.7)
Record low °F (°C)	−13 (−25)	−9 (−23)	5 (−15)	25 (−4)	31 (−1)	45 (7)	49 (9)	46 (8)	33 (1)	26 (−3)	4 (−16)	−8 (−22)	−13 (−25)
Average precipitation inches (mm)	4.19 (106)	4.95 (126)	5.56 (141)	5.15 (131)	6.00 (152)	4.68 (119)	4.13 (105)	3.32 (84)	3.85 (98)	3.80 (97)	4.71 (120)	5.78 (147)	56.12 (1,425)
Average snowfall inches (cm)	0.8 (2.0)	0.8 (2.0)	0.4 (1.0)	0.1 (0.25)	0.0 (0.0)	0.0 (0.0)	0.0 (0.0)	0.0 (0.0)	0.0 (0.0)	0.0 (0.0)	0.0 (0.0)	0.1 (0.25)	2.2 (5.6)
Average precipitation days (≥ 0.01 in)	10.4	9.7	10.7	9.7	10.3	8.7	8.0	6.5	6.6	7.3	9.0	10.7	107.6
Average snowy days (≥ 0.1 in)	0.9	0.7	0.1	0.0	0.0	0.0	0.0	0.0	0.0	0.0	0.0	0.2	1.9
Source: NOAA

== Demographics ==
Historical population
Census	Pop.	Note	%±
1850	971		—
1860	1,137		17.1%
1870	2,457		116.1%
1890	2,516		—
1900	2,645		5.1%
1910	2,882		9.0%
1920	3,062		6.2%
1930	3,204		4.6%
1940	4,012		25.2%
1950	4,711		17.4%
1960	5,424		15.1%
1970	7,011		29.3%
1980	9,307		32.7%
1990	10,019		7.7%
2000	10,748		7.3%
2010	10,292		−4.2%
2020	9,788		−4.9%

=== Racial and ethnic composition ===
Brownsville city, Tennessee – Racial and ethnic composition Note: the US Census treats Hispanic/Latino as an ethnic category. This table excludes Latinos from the racial categories and assigns them to a separate category. Hispanics/Latinos may be of any race.
Race / Ethnicity (NH = Non-Hispanic)	Pop 2000	Pop 2010	Pop 2020	% 2000	% 2010	% 2020
White alone (NH)	3,799	3,056	2,427	35.35%	29.69%	24.80%
Black or African American alone (NH)	6,496	6,631	6,507	60.44%	64.43%	66.48%
Native American or Alaska Native alone (NH)	9	17	18	0.08%	0.17%	0.18%
Asian alone (NH)	11	11	16	0.10%	0.11%	0.16%
Native Hawaiian or Pacific Islander alone (NH)	1	0	4	0.01%	0.00%	0.04%
Other race alone (NH)	1	14	34	0.01%	0.14%	0.35%
Mixed race or Multiracial (NH)	43	82	201	0.40%	0.80%	2.05%
Hispanic or Latino (any race)	388	481	581	3.61%	4.67%	5.94%
Total	10,748	10,292	9,788	100.00%	100.00%	100.00%

=== 2020 census ===
As of the 2020 census, Brownsville had a population of 9,788, 4,134 households, and 2,428 families residing in the city. 98.3% of residents lived in urban areas, while 1.7% lived in rural areas.

The median age was 38.9 years. 25.4% of residents were under the age of 18 and 17.3% of residents were 65 years of age or older. For every 100 females there were 80.3 males, and for every 100 females age 18 and over there were 74.5 males age 18 and over.

Of the 4,134 households, 31.7% had children under the age of 18 living in them. Of all households, 28.9% were married-couple households, 18.7% were households with a male householder and no spouse or partner present, and 46.8% were households with a female householder and no spouse or partner present. About 33.6% of all households were made up of individuals and 14.3% had someone living alone who was 65 years of age or older.

There were 4,526 housing units, of which 8.7% were vacant. The homeowner vacancy rate was 2.3% and the rental vacancy rate was 8.1%.

Racial composition as of the 2020 census
Race	Number	Percent
White	2,509	25.6%
Black or African American	6,530	66.7%
American Indian and Alaska Native	40	0.4%
Asian	16	0.2%
Native Hawaiian and Other Pacific Islander	7	0.1%
Some other race	382	3.9%
Two or more races	304	3.1%

=== 2000 census ===
As of the census of 2000, there was a population of 10,748, with 4,105 households and 2,865 families residing in the city. The population density was 1,178.1 inhabitants per square mile (454.9/km^{2}). There were 4,372 housing units at an average density of 479.2 per square mile (185.0/km^{2}). The racial makeup of the city was 60.72% African American, 36.52% White, 0.14% Native American, 0.10% Asian, 0.07% Pacific Islander, 1.83% from other races, and 0.61% from two or more races. Hispanic or Latino of any race were 3.61% of the population.

There were 4,105 households, out of which 35.4% had children under the age of 18 living with them, 38.8% were married couples living together, 27.3% had a female householder with no husband present, and 30.2% were non-families. 27.0% of all households were made up of individuals, and 11.8% had someone living alone who was 65 years of age or older. The average household size was 2.58 and the average family size was 3.11.

In the city, the population was spread out, with 29.5% under the age of 18, 10.4% from 18 to 24, 27.1% from 25 to 44, 19.4% from 45 to 64, and 13.6% who were 65 years of age or older. The median age was 33 years. For every 100 females, there were 80.2 males. For every 100 females age 18 and over, there were 73.3 males.

The median income for a household in the city was $27,276, and the median income for a family was $33,782. Males had a median income of $30,313 versus $22,030 for females. The per capita income for the city was $15,217. About 18.0% of families and 21.3% of the population were below the poverty line, including 26.3% of those under age 18 and 27.0% of those age 65 or over.

== Education ==
Brownsville is currently served by the six schools within the Haywood County School system. They are: Anderson Early Childhood Center, comprising pre-kindergarten and kindergarten, Haywood Elementary School, comprising grades 1 and 2, East Side Elementary School, comprising grades 3 and 4, Sunny Hill Intermediate School, comprising grades 5 and 6, Haywood Middle School, comprising grades 7 and 8, and Haywood High School, comprising grades 9 through 12. The school system also operates the Haywood County Virtual Academy for students between kindergarten and eight grade, as well as the Students Options Academy, an alternative learning center. The Tennessee College of Applied Technology-Jackson operates an extension branch in the city. Additionally, the University of Tennessee system operates an Institute of Agriculture extension in Brownsville in collaboration with an extension from Tennessee State University's College of Agriculture.

In the past, Brownsville was home to institutes of higher education. The Brownsville Female Seminary was founded in 1842 by Presbyterian settlers. The Brownsville Baptist Female College was established in 1850 by the Tennessee Baptist Convention and opened in 1851. This was the only one of 18 colleges within a 60 mile radius of Brownsville to survive the Civil War. There were a limited number of male graduates of this female college, but among them was future governor of Missouri Joseph Folk. Former president of Wake Forest College John Brown White served as president of the Brownsville Baptist Female College briefly until 1855. This college survived until 1897 and the campus remained empty until 1911, when it was purchased by the county to house Haywood High School, which remained there until the opening of the current location in 1970. Organized in 1869, the Wesleyan Female College was formed, offering courses in languages, music, and other academic disciplines. Wesleyan survived until the 1890s, when it was closed by its trustees, and thereafter became the home of the Ogilvie Training School for Boys.

Brownsville also operated Dunbar School, established in the 1890s to serve the African American population. Dunbar School burned in the 1919 and was replaced by Haywood County Training School, later renamed George Washington Carver High School. Also in the late 19th century, Brownsville Public School was opened, operating as a grammar school and offering high school courses until the establishment of Haywood High School. This school building was destroyed by a fire in the late 1920s. Haywood County Memorial Hospital was built in its place and served the community between 1931 and 1974, before being replaced by Haywood Park General Hospital. Additionally, a private school, Tennessee Academy was formed in 1969 to house grades K-12. In 1985 Tennessee Academy was purchased by the county and became Haywood Junior High School, now Haywood Middle School.

Brownsville was considered by the Tennessee General Assembly in 1963 to receive one of the state's first three community colleges. However, the college was ultimately given to nearby Jackson and became Jackson State Community College, the first of its kind in West Tennessee.

Brownsville is served by the Elma Ross Public Library. The library finished construction in 1992 after funding was raised jointly by the county, city, and local philanthropist David William Ross. Brownsville was previously served by a Carnegie Library, established after Brownsville mayor John O. Bomer received a $7,500 grant in 1909. This library finished construction in 1912 and was renamed the Brownsville-Haywood County Library in 1957. This library began to become overcrowded in the late 1980s, prompting the construction of the current library. The Carnegie Library building is now used by the Brownsville-Haywood County Chamber of Commerce.

Brownsville's only local newspaper is the Brownsville States-Graphic. The States-Graphic was formed by a merger between The States Democrat and The Graphic in 1900. The States Democrat itself was formed from a merger of The States and The Democrat in 1886. The first newspaper to be printed in Brownsville was The Phoenix in 1837. This paper was used primarily to print partisan papers during political campaigns.

== Arts and culture ==
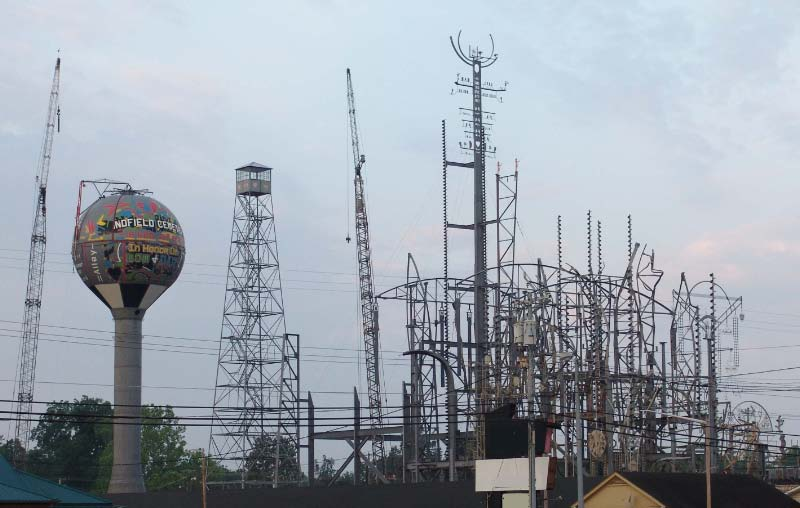
The Mindfield, by Brownsville artist Billy Tripp

The Tina Turner Museum—dedicated to singer Tina Turner, born in Brownsville in 1939—is located in a renovated schoolhouse Turner attended. Located alongside the Tina Turner Museum is the relocated childhood home of local blues musician Sleepy John Estes.

The Ann L. Marks Performing Arts Center is located in the College Hill Historic District. The theater is named for local writer Ann Liberman Marks, who made substantial contributions to the arts during her lifetime. The theater houses 420 attendees and was built in 1920. The theater was damaged by a storm in 2020, but reopened after renovations on January 11, 2024.

Brownsville is home to The Mindfield, the largest sculpture in Tennessee. It has been single-handedly constructed by local author and artist Billy Tripp every year since 1989. The sculpture is 127 feet at its tallest and approximately 300 feet in length.

In 2017, construction was completed on an amphitheater in downtown Brownsville. The venue plays host to numerous events, including concerts, fundraisers, and public celebrations. Free weekly concerts are held regularly in the summer to showcase local talent.

Brownsville was previously home to a spacious three-story opera house. This venue saw many traveling companies throughout the years, and also hosted various local programs, talent shows, and dances. Notable performances at the opera house were done by W. C. Handy and John Philip Sousa. The opera house was destroyed by a fire that had started in a restaurant nearby in December of 1931.

== Notable people ==
- Henry Whitelaw Bond (1848–1919), justice of the Missouri Supreme Court
- William W. Bond (1884–1975), lawyer and Speaker of the Tennessee House of Representatives
- Son Bonds (1909–1947), country blues musician
- Vic Bradford (1915–1994), Major League Baseball outfielder
- Patsy Bruce (1940–2021), country-western songwriter
- Paul Burlison (1929–2003), rockabilly pioneer, guitarist, member of The Rock and Roll Trio
- Tony Delk (born 1974), basketball player and coach, graduated from Haywood High School
- Pat Estes (1872–1947), attorney and college football player
- Clay Evans (1925–2019), gospel singer, pastor and founder of Fellowship Missionary Baptist Church in Chicago, Illinois
- Rockey Felker (born 1953), football player and coach
- Joseph Folk (1869–1923), Circuit Attorney of the city of St. Louis, later 31st governor of Missouri
- Alfred A. Freeman (1838–1926), politician and judge, candidate for governor in 1872
- Richard Halliburton (1900–1939), adventurer and author
- Thomas J. Henderson (1824–1911), United States Representative from Illinois and Union officer
- Eugene Holmes (1932–2007), opera singer
- Trell Hooper (born 1961), former professional football defensive back
- Miles Vandahurst Lynk (1871–1956), founder, editor and publisher of Medical and Surgical Observer, the first medical journal issued by an African American
- Edith Mitchell (1947–2024), oncologist and brigadier general of the United States Air Force
- Corey Moore (born 1974), professional football player
- Hambone Willie Newbern (1901–1965), country blues musician
- Hammie Nixon (1908–1984), blues musician, son-in-law of Sleepy John Estes
- David A. Nunn (1833–1918), member of the United States House of Representatives
- Jimmy Oldham (1893–1930), Negro League pitcher
- Yank Rachell (1910–1997), country blues musician
- Brett Scallions (born 1971), frontman of the band Fuel
- Geneva Smitherman, Professor Emerita of English and co-founder of the African American and African Studies doctoral program at Michigan State University
- Harold M. Shaw (1877–1926), silent film director, screenwriter, and actor
- Nettie Barcroft Taylor (1914–2016), state librarian of Maryland
- Polk Taylor (1833–1934), Methodist minister
- Quintard Taylor (born 1948), historian and founder of BlackPast.org
- Zachary Taylor (1849–1921), member of the United States House of Representatives
- Jim Thaxton (born 1949), football player
- Billy Tripp (born 1955), author and artist
- Tina Turner (1939–2023), singer and actress, who lived in nearby Nutbush as a child
- Leroy Tyus (1916–1998) politician, real estate developer
- Jarvis Varnado (born 1988), professional basketball player, NCAA all-time career blocks leader as a member of the Mississippi State Bulldogs
- Dwight Waller (1945–2021), professional basketball player for the Atlanta Hawks and the Denver Rockets
- T. I. Webb Jr. (1880–1975), golfer
- Elbert Williams (1908–1940), African-American civil rights activist, lived in Brownsville and was lynched there in 1940
- William Ridley Wills (1871–1949), Founder of National Life and Accident Insurance Company
- William Ridley Wills (1897–1957), American poet, novelist, newspaperman, nephew of the above

== In popular culture ==
- Brownsville is mentioned in the song "Delta Dawn". The song's writer, Alex Harvey, was from Haywood County.
- Some scenes of the 1970 film The Liberation of L.B. Jones were shot in Brownsville, most notably at the now defunct train station.
- Multiple scenes in the 1992 television film Taking Back My Life: The Nancy Ziegenmeyer Story were shot in Brownsville. The scenes were filmed in the pool hall and on College Street.
