= 2022 Tennessee elections =

Tennessee state elections in 2022 were held on Tuesday, November 8, 2022. Primary elections for the United States House of Representatives, governorship, Tennessee Senate, and Tennessee House of Representatives, as well as various judicial retention elections, including elections for all five Tennessee Supreme Court justices as well as general local elections, were held on August 4, 2022. There were also four constitutional amendments to the Constitution of Tennessee on the November 8 ballot.

== United States Congress ==
=== House of Representatives ===
District results: Republican: 50–60%; 60–70%; 70–80%; Democratic: 70–80%

Tennessee elected nine U.S. Representatives, each representing one of Tennessee's nine congressional districts.

=== Results ===
District	Republican		Democratic		Others		Total		Result
District	Votes	%	Votes	%	Votes	%	Votes	%	Result
District 1	147,241	78.32%	37,049	19.71%	3,713	1.97%	188,003	100.0%	Republican hold
District 2	141,089	67.91%	66,673	32.09%	0	0.00%	207,762	100.0%	Republican hold
District 3	136,639	68.38%	60,334	30.19%	2,857	1.43%	199,830	100.0%	Republican hold
District 4	122,401	70.57%	44,648	25.74%	6,388	3.68%	173,437	100.0%	Republican hold
District 5	123,558	55.84%	93,648	42.32%	4,069	1.84%	221,275	100.0%	Republican gain
District 6	129,388	66.33%	65,675	33.67%	0	0.00%	195,063	100.0%	Republican hold
District 7	108,421	59.96%	68,973	38.14%	3,428	1.90%	180,822	100.0%	Republican hold
District 8	155,602	73.99%	51,102	24.30%	3,611	1.72%	210,315	100.0%	Republican hold
District 9	35,123	26.23%	93,800	70.04%	4,995	3.73%	133,918	100.0%	Democratic hold
Total	1,099,462	64.28%	581,902	34.02%	29,061	1.70%	1,710,425	100.0%	

Popular vote
Republican	64.28%
Democratic	34.02%
Other	1.70%

House seats
Republican	88.89%
Democratic	11.11%

== Gubernatorial ==
Final results by county: Lee: 50–60%; 60–70%; 70–80%; 80–90%; Martin: 50–60%; 60–70%

Incumbent Republican governor Bill Lee was re-elected to a second term with almost 65% of the vote, improving on his performance from 2018.

The Tennessee primaries took place on August 4, 2022, with Lee and Democrat Jason Martin winning their respective parties' nominations.

Lee was sworn in on January 21, 2023.

=== Results ===
2022 Tennessee gubernatorial election
Party	Candidate	Votes	%	±%
Republican	Bill Lee (incumbent)	1,129,390	64.91%	+5.55
Democratic	Jason Martin	572,818	32.92%	−5.63
Independent	John Gentry	15,395	0.89%	N/A
Independent	Constance Every	10,277	0.59%	N/A
Independent	Deborah Rouse	3,772	0.22%	N/A
Independent	Rick Tyler	2,380	0.14%	N/A
Independent	Charles Van Morgan	1,862	0.11%	N/A
Independent	Basil Marceaux	1,568	0.09%	N/A
Independent	Alfred O'Neil	1,216	0.07%	N/A
Independent	Michael Scantland	815	0.05%	N/A
Write-In	Lemichael D. Wilson	386	0.02%	N/A
Write-In	Charles Carney	2	0.00%	N/A
Write-In	Stephen C. Maxwell	1	0.00%	N/A
Write-In	Kameron Parker Scott	0	0.00%	N/A
Total votes		1,739,882	100.00%	
Turnout		1,739,882	38.57%	−15.89%
Registered electors		4,550,026		
Republican hold				

August 4, 2022, primary results

Results by county: Martin: 30–40%; 40–50%; 50–60%; 60–70%; Smiley: 30–40%; 40–50%; 50–60%; 60–70%; Atwater: 30–40%

Democratic primary results
Party	Candidate	Votes	%
Democratic	Jason Martin	101,552	39.39
Democratic	J.B. Smiley Jr.	100,062	38.81
Democratic	Carnita Atwater	56,227	21.81
Total votes		257,841	100.00

Republican primary results
Party	Candidate	Votes	%
Republican	Bill Lee (incumbent)	494,362	100.00
Total votes		494,362	100.00

== State legislature ==
=== State Senate ===

Results by senate districts

Winners:

Republican hold
Democratic hold
No election

Elections for 17 of the 33 seats in Tennessee's State Senate were held on November 8, 2022. There were three open seats and 14 incumbents who ran for re-election.

Following the 2022 elections, no seats flipped.

Summary of the November 8, 2022 Tennessee Senate election results
Party	Candidates	Votes		Seats				
Party	Candidates	No.	%	Before	Up	Won	After	+/–
Republican	15	546,264	70.64	27	13	13	27	Steady
Democratic	10	207,273	26.81	6	4	4	6	Steady
Independent	3	19,716	2.55	0	0	0	0	Steady
Total		773,253	100.00	33	17	17	33	Steady

Popular vote
Republican	70.64%
Democratic	26.81%
Independents	2.55%

Senate seats
Republican	81.82%
Democratic	18.18%

=== State House of Representatives ===

Results by state house districts

Winners:

Republican hold
Republican gain
Democratic hold

The election of all 99 seats in the Tennessee House of Representatives occurred on November 8, 2022.

Republicans gained two seats, expanding their supermajority in the state house even more. John Windle lost his re-election bid after registering as an independent.

Summary of the November 8, 2022 Tennessee House election results
Party	Candidates	Votes		Seats	
Party	Candidates	No.	%	No.	+/–
Republican	81	1,077,324	70.48	75	▲2
Democratic	54	410,589	26.86	24	▼1
Independent	12	39,777	2.60	0	▼1
Write-in		804	0.05	0	Steady
Total		1,528,494	100.00	99	Steady

Popular vote
Republican	70.48%
Democratic	26.86%
Independent	2.60%
Write-ins	0.05%

House seats
Republican	75.76%
Democratic	24.24%

=== Close races ===
Four races were decided by a margin of 10% or less:

District	Winner	Margin
District 67	Democratic	1.34%
District 59	Democratic	4.76%
District 41	Republican (flip)	5.1%
District 18	Republican	8.22%

== Ballot measures ==
=== Amendment 1 ===
Amendment 1
- Shall Article XI of the Constitution of Tennessee be amended by adding the following language as a new section? "It is unlawful for any person, corporation, association, or this state or its political subdivisions to deny or attempt to deny employment to any person by reason of the person's membership in, affiliation with, resignation from, or refusal to join or affiliate with any labor union or employee organization."

Results
Choice	Votes	%
Yes	1,141,941	69.79%
No	494,239	30.21%
Valid votes	1,636,180	100.00%
Invalid or blank votes	0	0.00%
Total votes	1,636,180	100.00%
- Results by county Yes 70–80% 60–70% 50–60%

This is an approved legislatively referred constitutional amendment to the Constitution of Tennessee. The amendment adds language to the constitution to prohibit workplaces from requiring mandatory labor union membership for employees as a condition for employment. The U.S. state of Tennessee has been a right-to-work state by statute since 1947. However, this referendum will make the law a right and amendment written into the state's constitution.

=== Amendment 2 ===
Amendment 2
- Question: Shall Article III, Section 12 of the Constitution of Tennessee be amended by adding the following language immediately following the current language in the Section? "Whenever the Governor transmits to the Secretary of State, the Speaker of the Senate, and the Speaker of the House of Representatives, a written, signed declaration that the Governor is unable to discharge the powers and duties of the office, the powers and duties of the office of Governor shall be temporarily discharged by the Speaker of the Senate as Acting Governor, or if that office is unoccupied, then by the Speaker of the House of Representatives as Acting Governor, until the Governor transmits to the same officials a written, signed declaration that the Governor is able to discharge the powers and duties of the office. Whenever a majority of the commissioners of administrative departments of the Executive Department transmits to the Secretary of State, the Speaker of the Senate, and the Speaker of the House of Representatives their written, signed declaration that the Governor is unable to discharge the powers and duties of the office, the Speaker of the Senate shall immediately assume the powers and duties of the office as Acting Governor, or if that office is unoccupied, then the Speaker of the House of Representatives shall immediately assume the powers and duties of the office as Acting Governor, until the Governor transmits to the same officials a written, signed declaration that the Governor is able to discharge the powers and duties of the office. Whenever a Speaker is temporarily discharging the powers and duties of the office of Governor as Acting Governor, such Speaker shall not be required to resign the Speaker’s position as the Speaker or to resign as a member of the general assembly and shall retain the Speaker’s salary and not receive the Governor’s salary, but such Speaker shall not preside as Speaker or vote as a member of the general assembly during the time the Speaker is Acting Governor. and Shall Article III, Section 13 of the Constitution of Tennessee be amended by adding the following language immediately before the period at the end of the Section? except as provided in Article III, Section 12 with regard to the Speaker of the Senate or the Speaker of the House of Representatives temporarily discharging the powers and duties of the office of Governor as Acting Governor and Shall Article II, Section 26 of the Constitution of Tennessee be amended by adding the following language at the end of the Section? This section shall not apply with regard to the Speaker of the Senate or the Speaker of the House of Representatives temporarily discharging the powers and duties of the office of Governor as Acting Governor under Article III, Section 12."

Results
Choice	Votes	%
Yes	1,176,297	74.62%
No	400,109	25.38%
Valid votes	1,576,406	100.00%
Invalid or blank votes	0	0.00%
Total votes	1,576,406	100.00%
- Results by county Yes 80–90% 70–80% 60–70%

This amendment would add to article III, section 12 of the Tennessee Constitution a process for the temporary exercise of the powers and duties of the governor by the Speaker of the Senate—or the Speaker of the House if there is no Speaker of the Senate in office—when the governor is unable to discharge the powers and duties of the office of governor. While a Speaker is temporarily discharging the powers and duties of the governor, the Speaker would not be required to resign as Speaker or to resign as a member of the legislature; but the Speaker would not be able to preside as Speaker or vote as a member of the legislature. A Speaker who is temporarily discharging the powers and duties of the governor would not get the governor's salary but would get the Speaker's salary. The amendment would also exempt a Speaker who is temporarily discharging the powers and duties of the governor from provisions in the Constitution that would otherwise prohibit the Speaker from exercising the powers of the governor and from simultaneously holding more than one state office.

=== Amendment 3 ===
Amendment 3
- Shall Article I, Section 33 of the Constitution of Tennessee be amended by deleting the section and substituting instead the following? "Section 33. Slavery and involuntary servitude are forever prohibited. Nothing in this section shall prohibit an inmate from working when the inmate has been duly convicted of a crime."

Results
Choice	Votes	%
Yes	1,294,296	79.53%
No	333,071	20.47%
Valid votes	1,627,367	100.00%
Invalid or blank votes	0	0.00%
Total votes	1,627,367	100.00%
- Results by county Yes 80–90% 70–80% 60–70%

This amendment would change the current language in article I, section 33 of the Tennessee Constitution, which says that slavery and involuntary servitude, except as punishment for a person who has been duly convicted of crime, are forever prohibited in this State. The amendment would delete this current language and replace it with the following language: “Slavery and involuntary servitude are forever prohibited. Nothing in this section shall prohibit an inmate from working when the inmate has been duly convicted of a crime."

=== Amendment 4 ===
Amendment 4
- Shall Article IX, Section 1 of the Constitution of Tennessee be amended by deleting the section?

Results
Choice	Votes	%
Yes	1,020,981	63.24%
No	593,461	36.76%
Valid votes	1,614,442	100.00%
Invalid or blank votes	0	0.00%
Total votes	1,614,442	100.00%
- Results by county Yes 70–80% 60–70% 50–60%

This amendment would delete article IX, section 1 of the Tennessee Constitution, which prohibits ministers of the gospel and priests of any denomination from holding a seat in either House of the legislature.

== Judicial ==
=== Supreme Court retention elections ===
Retention races results by congressional districts Yes: 60–70%; 70–80%

All incumbent Tennessee Supreme Court Justices won their retention elections.

Tennessee Supreme Court Chief Justice, Roger A. Page retention election
Choice	Votes	%
For	450,681	72.11
Against	174,269	27.89
Total	624,950	100.00

Tennessee Supreme Court Associate Justice, Sharon G. Lee retention election
Choice	Votes	%
For	463,799	73.00
Against	171,522	27.00
Total	635,321	100.00

Tennessee Supreme Court Associate Justice, Jeffrey S. Bivins retention election
Choice	Votes	%
For	462,036	71.53
Against	183,853	28.47
Total	645,889	100.00

Tennessee Supreme Court Associate Justice, Holly M. Kirby retention election
Choice	Votes	%
For	468,351	73.81
Against	166,200	26.19
Total	634,551	100.00

Tennessee Supreme Court Associate Justice, Sarah K. Campbell retention election
Choice	Votes	%
For	466,860	72.93
Against	173,306	27.07
Total	640,166	100.00

=== District Attorneys ===
2022 Tennessee District Attorney elections
- August 4, 2022

All 32 districts of the Tennessee courts
	Majority party	Minority party	Third party
Party	Republican	Independent	Democratic
Last election	16	10	5
Seats before	18 (Note: Because some seats changed parties between 2014 and 2022 due to special elections or attorneys switching party affiliation, Republicans ultimately gained 2 extra seats then what they had in the previous cycle. The incumbents in Districts 23 and 25, both previously elected as independents, changed their party affiliation to Republican and ran for re-election.)	10 (Note: The incumbents in Districts 7, 12, and 31 all previously elected as Democrats, changed their party affiliation to Independent and ran for re-election. The incumbents in Districts 23 and 25, both previously elected as independents, changed their party affiliation to Republican and ran for re-election. In District 28, since Jason C. Scott's political affiliation is not publicly known and his predecessor was an independent, we will exclude this district from the count of seats held prior.)	2 (Note: The incumbents in Districts 7, 12, and 31 all previously elected as Democrats, changed their party affiliation to Independent and ran for re-election.)
Seats won	24	6	2
Seat change	▲6 (Note: In 2014, District 28 was won by Independent Garry Brown. After his retirement in 2020, he was succeeded by Jason C. Scott. Since Scott's political affiliation is not publicly known, the district is considered a Republican gain following the 2022 election, when a Republican succeeded Scott. In a 2018 special election, District 1 flipped from Republican to Independent when an independent candidate won the seat. In 2022, a Republican candidate reclaimed the district, so it is recorded as a Republican gain. This election marked the first for the newly established 32nd district, which was won by a Republican.)	▼4	Steady
Popular vote	460,703	86,179	165,874
Percentage	64.64%	12.09%	23.27%
- Results: Republican gain Independent gain Democratic gain Republican hold Independent hold Democratic hold Vote share: 50–60% 60–70% >90% 50–60% 60–70% >90% 50–60% >90%

Map of Tennessee's judicial districts

Tennessee District Attorneys, who serve as the prosecutors for felonies in the state, are elected to eight-year terms. One attorney is elected for each of the 32 judicial districts in Tennessee. This election marked the first for the newly established 32nd district. Following the 2014 elections, 16 attorneys were affiliated with the Republican Party, 5 with the Democratic Party, and 10 were Independents.

==== Results ====
Summary of elections
District		Incumbent			elected
#	Counties	Attorney	Party	Status	elected
1	Carter, Johnson, Unicoi, and Washington	Ken C. Baldwin	Independent	Incumbent retired. Republican gain.	▌Steve Finney (Republican)
2	Sullivan	Barry P. Staubus	Republican	Incumbent re-elected.	▌Barry P. Staubus (Republican)
3	Greene, Hamblen, Hancock, and Hawkins	Dan E. Armstrong	Republican	Incumbent re-elected.	▌Dan E. Armstrong (Republican)
4	Cocke, Grainger, Jefferson, and Sevier	Jimmy B. Dunn	Republican	Incumbent re-elected.	▌Jimmy B. Dunn (Republican)
5	Blount	Mike L. Flynn	Republican	Incumbent retired. Republican hold.	▌Ryan Desmond (Republican)
6	Knox	Charme Allen	Republican	Incumbent re-elected.	▌Charme Allen (Republican) 57.43%; ▌Jackson M. Fenner (Democratic) 42.57%
7	Anderson	Dave S. Clark	Independent	Incumbent re-elected.	▌Dave S. Clark (Independent)
8	Campbell, Claiborne, Fentress, Scott, and Union	Jared R. Effler	Independent	Incumbent re-elected.	▌Jared R. Effler (Independent)
9	Loudon, Meigs, Morgan, and Roane	Russell Johnson	Independent	Incumbent re-elected.	▌Russell Johnson (Independent)
10	Bradley, McMinn, Monroe, and Polk	Stephen D. Crump	Republican	Incumbent re-elected.	▌Stephen D. Crump (Republican)
11	Hamilton	Neal Pinkston	Republican	Incumbent lost re-nomination. Republican hold.	▌Coty Wamp (Republican) 59.00%; ▌John Allen Brooks (Democratic) 41.00%
12	Bledsoe, Franklin, Grundy, Marion, Rhea, and Sequatchie	Mike Taylor	Independent	Incumbent lost re-election. Republican gain.	▌Courtney Lynch (Republican) 68.94%; ▌Mike Taylor* (Independent) 31.06%
13	Clay, Cumberland, DeKalb, Overton, Pickett, Putnam, and White	Bryant C. Dunaway	Republican	Incumbent re-elected.	▌Bryant C. Dunaway (Republican)
14	Coffee	Craig Northcott	Republican	Incumbent re-elected.	▌Craig Northcott (Republican)
15	Jackson, Macon, Smith, Trousdale, and Wilson	Tom P. Thompson Jr.	Independent	Incumbent retired. Republican gain.	▌Jason Lawson (Republican)
16	Cannon and Rutherford	Jennings H. Jones	Republican	Incumbent re-elected.	▌Jennings H. Jones (Republican)
17	Bedford, Lincoln, Marshall, and Moore	Robert J. Carter	Independent	Incumbent re-elected.	▌Robert J. Carter (Independent)
18	Sumner	Ray Whitley	Republican	Incumbent re-elected.	▌Ray Whitley (Republican)
19	Montgomery and Robertson	John W. Carney Jr.	Independent	Incumbent retired. Republican gain.	▌Robert Nash (Republican)
20	Davidson	Glenn Funk	Democratic	Incumbent re-elected.	▌Glenn Funk (Democratic)
21	Hickman, Lewis, and Perry	Kim R. Helper (R)	Republican	Incumbent re-elected.	▌Kim R. Helper (R) (Republican)
22	Giles, Lawrence, Maury, and Wayne	Brent A. Cooper	Republican	Incumbent re-elected.	▌Brent A. Cooper (Republican)
23	Cheatham, Dickson, Houston, Humphreys, and Stewart	Ray Crouch Jr.	Republican	Incumbent re-elected.	▌Ray Crouch Jr (Republican)
24	Benton, Carroll, Decatur, Hardin, and Henry	Matthew F. Stowe	Republican	Incumbent lost re-nomination. Republican hold.	▌Neil Thomson (Republican)
25	Fayette, Hardeman, Lauderdale, McNairy, and Tipton	Mark E. Davidson	Republican	Incumbent re-elected.	▌Mark E. Davidson (Republican)
26	Chester, Henderson, and Madison	Jody Pickens	Republican	Incumbent re-elected.	▌Jody Pickens (Republican)
27	Obion and Weakley	Tommy A. Thomas	Democratic	Incumbent retired. Incumbent gain.	▌Colin Johnson (Independent) 50.32%; ▌Adam P. Nelson (Republican) 49.68%
28	Crockett, Gibson, and Haywood	Jason C. Scott	Unknown party	Incumbent retired. Republican gain.	▌ Frederick Agee (Republican)
29	Dyer and Lake	Danny Goodman, Jr.	Independent	Incumbent re-elected.	▌Danny Goodman Jr.* (Independent) 66.73%; ▌Richard J. Schoepke (Independent) 33.27%
30	Shelby	Amy P. Weirich	Republican	Incumbent lost re-election. Democratic gain.	▌Steven J. Mulroy (Democratic) 56.25%; ▌Amy P. Weirich* (Republican) 43.75%
31	Van Buren and Warren	Lisa Zavogiannis	Independent	Incumbent lost re-election. Republican gain.	▌Christopher R. Stanford (Republican) 58.22%; ▌Lisa Zavogiannis* (Independent) 41.78%
32	Williamson	N/A	N/A	New district. Republican gain.	▌Hans L. Schwendimann (Republican)

=== District Attorney General District 11 (Countywide) ===
Final results by precinct: Wamp: 50–60%; 60–70%; 70–80%; 80–90%; Allen Brooks: 50–60%; 60–70%; 70–80%; 80–90%; >90%

Republican nominee Coty Wamp, daughter of former U.S. representative Zach Wamp, and sister of Weston Wamp, won with 59.0% of the vote, defeating Democratic nominee John Allen Brooks.

==== Results ====
August 4, 2022 general election results
Party	Candidate	Votes	%
Republican	Coty Wamp	28,836	59.00%
Democratic	John Allen Brooks	20,040	41.00%
Total votes		48,876	100.00%

May 3, 2022, primary results

Democratic primary results
Party	Candidate	Votes	%
Democratic	John Allen Brooks	5,873	100.00%
Total votes		5,873	100.00%

Republican primary results
Party	Candidate	Votes	%
Republican	Coty Wamp	27,929	71.03%
Republican	Neal Pinkston (incumbent)	11,391	28.97%
Total votes		39,320	100.00%

== Local elections ==
=== Hamilton County ===
==== County Mayor ====
Final results by precinct: Wamp: 50–60%; 60–70%; 70–80%; 80–90%; Adams: 50–60%; 60–70%; 70–80%; 80–90%; Tie

Republican nominee Weston Wamp, son of former U.S. representative Zach Wamp, won with 57.9% of the vote, defeating Democratic nominee Matt Adams. Incumbent Republican mayor Jim Coppinger, who was appointed county mayor in 2011, chose not to run for a fourth term.

==== Results ====
August 4, 2022 general election results
Party	Candidate	Votes	%
Republican	Weston Wamp	28,199	57.89%
Democratic	Matt Adams	20,512	42.11%
Total votes		48,711	100.00%

May 3, 2022, primary results

Democratic primary results
Party	Candidate	Votes	%
Democratic	Matt Adams	5,876	100.00%
Total votes		5,876	100.00%

Republican primary results
Party	Candidate	Votes	%
Republican	Weston Wamp	14,428	35.44%
Republican	Sabrena D. Smedley	14,110	34.66%
Republican	Matt Hullander	12,171	29.90%
Total votes		40,709	100.00%

=== Knox County ===
Final results by precinct: Jacobs: 50–60%; 60–70%; 70–80%; 80–90%; Helsley: 50–60%; 60–70%; 70–80%; 80–90%; >90%; No data

Incumbent Republican mayor Glenn Jacobs won re-election with 55.3% of the vote, defeating Democratic nominee Debbie Helsley.

==== Results ====
General election results
Party	Candidate	Votes	%
Republican	Glenn Jacobs	30,306	55.28%
Democratic	Debbie Helsley	24,520	44.72%
Write-in	Tracy A. Clough (write-in)	1	0.00%
Total votes		54,287	100.00%

May 3, 2022, primary results

Democratic primary results
Party	Candidate	Votes	%
Democratic	Debbie Helsley	5,921	74.20%
Democratic	Tyler Givens	1,397	17.51%
Democratic	Bob Fischer	662	8.30%
Total votes		7,980	100.00%

Republican primary results
Party	Candidate	Votes	%
Republican	Glenn Jacobs (incumbent)	24,687	100.00%
Total votes		24,687	100.00%

=== Shelby County ===
Final results by precinct: Harris: 50–60%; 60–70%; 70–80%; 80–90%; >90%; Morgan: 50–60%; 60–70%; 70–80%; 80–90%; Tie

Incumbent Democratic Mayor Lee Harris won re-election with 58.0% of the vote, defeating Republican nominee Worth Morgan.

==== Results ====
August 4, 2022 general election results
Party	Candidate	Votes	%
Democratic	Lee Harris (Incumbent)	78,606	57.98%
Republican	Worth Morgan	56,809	41.90%
Write-in	Write-in	256	0.12%
Total votes		135,571	100.00%

May 3, 2022, primary results

Democratic primary results
Party	Candidate	Votes	%
Democratic	Lee Harris (Incumbent)	33,759	70.06%
Democratic	Kenneth Moody	14,372	29.83%
Write-in	Write-in	56	0.12%
Total votes		48,187	100.00%

Republican primary results
Party	Candidate	Votes	%
Republican	Worth Morgan	14,259	99.19%
Write-in	Write-in	117	0.81%
Total votes		14,376	100.00%

=== Clarksville ===
Incumbent Democratic mayor Joe Pitts ran for re-election and won a second term in office in a three-way race.

November 8, 2022 Clarksville mayoral election
Candidate	Votes	%
Joe Pitts (I)	14,095	54.54%
David Allen	8,715	33.72%
A.C. "Big Sarge" Lopez	2,846	11.01%
Write-ins	189	0.73%
Total	25,845	100.00%

=== Memphis ===
Memphis law states that mayors can only serve two terms. However, the Memphis City Council voted to put an ordinance on the ballot that, if passed, would extend the limit to three terms. Incumbent mayor Jim Strickland expressed interest in running for a third term if Memphis voters approved the ordinance. The ordinance was decided on August 4, 2022. Voters overwhelmingly rejected it, keeping the two-term limit in place and barring Strickland from seeking re-election.

Memphis Ordinance 5823
Choice	Votes	%
Against	52,582	66.27%
For	26,759	33.73%
Total votes	79,341	100.00%

Precinct results Against: 70–80%; 60–70%; 50–60%; No data

=== Murfreesboro ===
Incumbent Republican mayor Shane McFarland ran for re-election and won a third term in office in a three-way race.

August 4, 2022 Murfreesboro mayoral election
Candidate	Votes	%
Shane McFarland (I)	8,446	66.45%
Tony Lehew	2,103	16.55%
Nathan Bennett	2,100	16.52%
Write-ins	61	0.48%
Total	12,710	100.00%

== See also ==
- Elections in Tennessee
- Political party strength in Tennessee
- Tennessee Democratic Party
- Tennessee Republican Party
- Government of Tennessee
- Tennessee Supreme Court
- 2022 United States elections
