= Government of Tennessee =

Government of the U.S. state of Tennessee

- Logo of the Tennessean government Seal of Tennessee
- Part of: United States of America
- Constitution: Constitution of Tennessee

Legislative branch
- Name: General Assembly
- Type: Bicameral
- Meeting place: Tennessee State Capitol
- Upper house
- Name: Senate
- Presiding officer: Randy McNally, Honorable
- Lower house
- Name: House of Representatives
- Presiding officer: Cameron Sexton, Speaker

Executive branch
- Head of state and government
- Title: Governor
- Currently: Bill Lee
- Appointer: Election
- Cabinet
- Name: Cabinet of the State of Tennessee
- Leader: Governor
- Headquarters: Tennessee State Capitol

Judicial branch
- Name: Judiciary of Tennessee
- Courts: Courts of Tennessee
- Tennessee Supreme Court
- Chief judge: Jeffrey S. Bivins
- Seat: Nashville, Knoxville, and Jackson

The Government of Tennessee is organized under the provisions of the 1870 Constitution of Tennessee, first adopted in 1796. As set forth by the state constitution, administrative influence in Tennessee is divided among three branches of government: executive, legislative, and judicial.

The seat of the government in Tennessee is located in its capital city of Nashville.

The Flag of Tennessee

== Executive branch ==
=== Governor ===
The Governor of Tennessee is the Supreme Executive Power set by the state Constitution. The Governor (currently Governor Bill Lee) is responsible for enforcing state laws and the state constitution and is also the keeper of the Great Seal of the State of Tennessee.

=== Lieutenant governor ===
The Tennessee Lieutenant Governor is the presiding officer of the Tennessee Senate and first in line in the succession to the office of governor of Tennessee. If the governor is incapacitated or dies in office, then the lieutenant governor becomes the governor. The lieutenant governor is a state senator elected by the entire Senate to be the Speaker of the Senate.

=== Cabinet Members ===
The Tennessee Governor's Cabinet is an advisory body that oversees the executive branch of the Tennessee state government. Members, titled "commissioners," are appointed by the governor—not subject to the approval of the Tennessee General Assembly—and oversee the various government departments and agencies. Additionally, several members of the governor's staff serve in the cabinet. Governor-elects can, and often do, rearrange the departments, and thus the number of commissioners.

Under the incumbent Governor Bill Lee, there are 29 members of the Cabinet: 22 commissioners, 1 director, and 6 members of the Governor's staff.

Tennessee's Governor and Lieutenant Governor
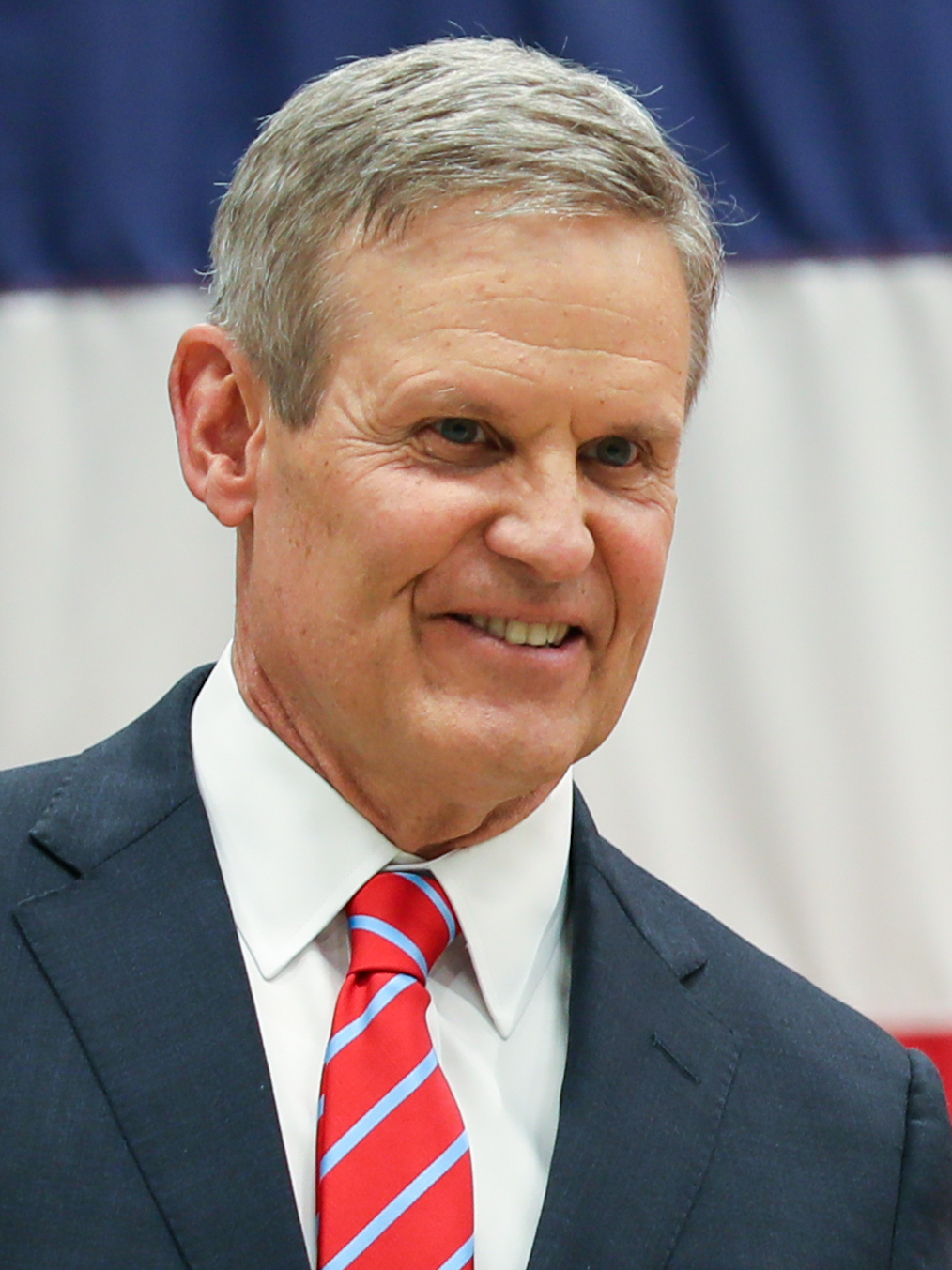
Bill Lee (R)
Governor

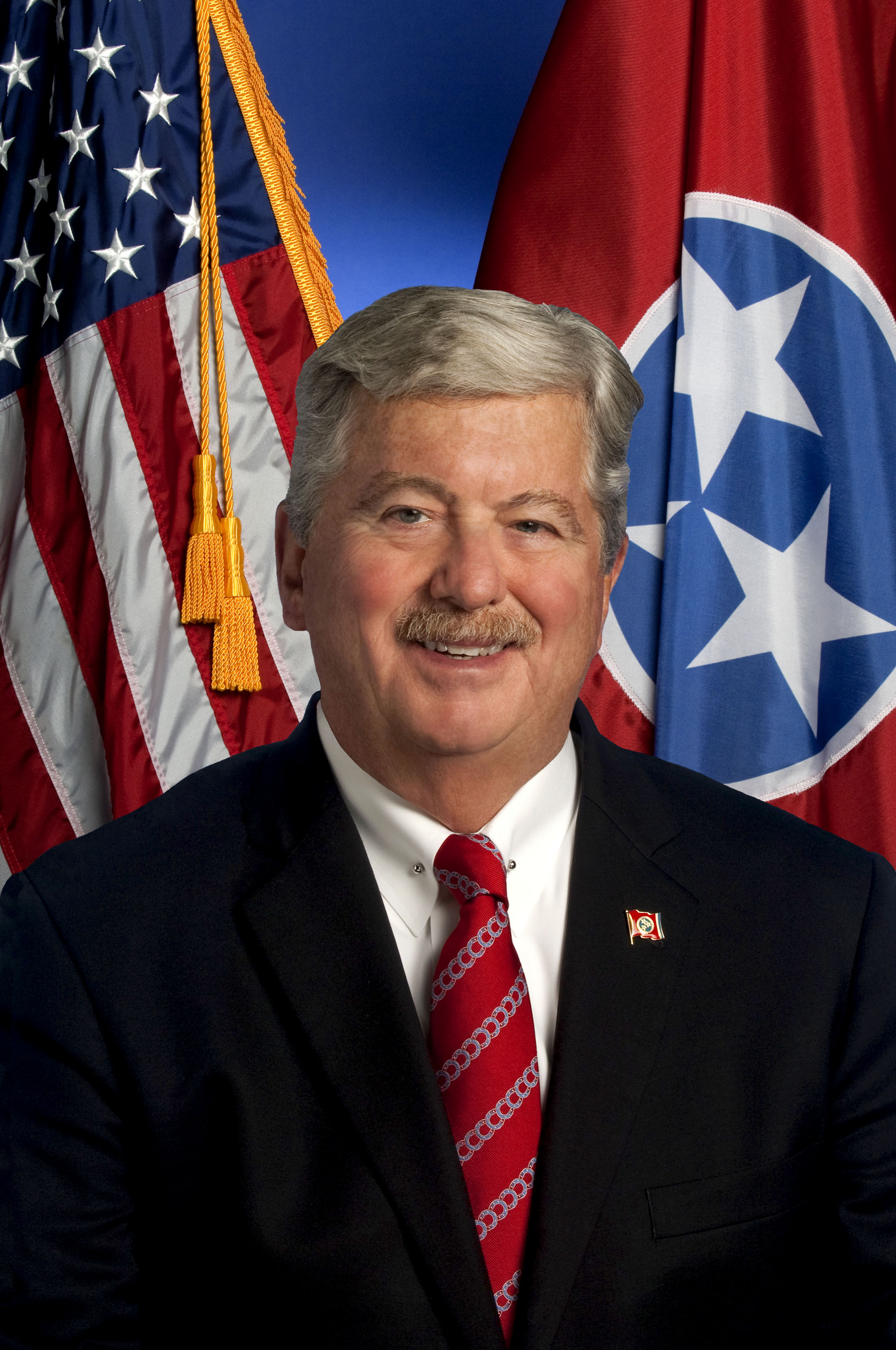
Randy McNally (R)
Lieutenant Governor

== Legislative branch ==
=== Tennessee General Assembly ===
Flag of the General Assembly of Tennessee

The state legislature is known as the Tennessee General Assembly. It consists of a 33 member Senate, and a 99 member House of Representatives. Senators serve four-year terms, and house members serve two-year terms. Each chamber elects its own speaker from among its members. The General Assembly is a part-time legislature, typically meeting from January through April or May each year.

The current Lieutenant Governor and Speaker of the Senate is Randy McNally (R-Oak Ridge). He was elected on January 10, 2017, and is the second consecutive Republican to hold the office.

The current Speaker of the House is Cameron Sexton (R-Crossville)

=== Constitutional Officers ===
Tennessee's three constitutional officers are elected by a joint session of the legislature. The Comptroller of the Treasury and State Treasurer are elected for two-year terms, and the Secretary of State is elected for a four-year term.

Tennessee Constitutional Officers
Constitutional Office	Incumbent	In office since	Website
Comptroller of the Treasury	Jason E. Mumpower	2021	
Secretary of State	Tre Hargett	2009	
State Treasurer	David Lillard	2009	

== Judicial branch ==
=== Supreme Court ===
The Supreme Court of Tennessee is the state's highest court in the state. The Supreme Court is composed of five members: a chief justice, and four justices. As of September 1, 2025, the incumbent Chief Justice is Jeffrey S. Bivins. No more than two justices can be from the same Grand Division.

=== Current composition ===
As of July 1, 2026, the justices of the Tennessee Supreme Court are:

Name	Born	Start date	Chief term	Term ends (Note: Term ends Aug. 31 of the year listed.)	Grand Division	Appointer	Law school	Succeeded
Jeffrey S. Bivins, Chief Justice	August 31, 1960 (age 66)	July 16, 2014	2016–2021; 2025–present	2030	Middle	Bill Haslam (R)	Vanderbilt	William C. Koch Jr.
Sarah K. Campbell	1982 (age 43–44)	February 10, 2022	–	2030	Middle	Bill Lee (R)	Duke	Cornelia Clark
Dwight E. Tarwater	April 28, 1955 (age 71)	September 1, 2023	–	2030	East	Bill Lee (R)	Tennessee	Sharon G. Lee
Mary L. Wagner	1984 (age 41–42)	September 1, 2024	–	2026	West	Bill Lee (R)	Memphis	Roger A. Page
Kyle Hixson	1983 (age 42–43)	July 1, 2026	–	2026 (special)	East	Bill Lee (R)	Tennessee	Holly M. Kirby

In a unique method known as the Tennessee Plan, Supreme Court justices, like all other appellate court judges, the Governor fills any vacancies that occur, with the advice and consent of the Tennessee General Assembly, from a list of three judges compiled by a commission. At the next election in which a governor is elected, voters are asked whether they want to retain or remove the newly-confirmed justice. Retention votes are held every eight years after. If voters decide to remove a justice, the process begins again.

As required by the Tennessee Constitution, the Supreme Court regularly meets in Jackson, Knoxville, and Nashville. In addition to the regular meetings of the Supreme Court, the Court takes their oral arguments on the road as part of the SCALES program (Supreme Court Advancing Legal Education for Students) a few times each year.

=== Attorney General ===
The Tennessee Attorney General is the state's chief legal officer and works to represent all of the state government. The Attorney General employs around 340 people across five offices around the state.

The Tennessee Supreme Court appoints the Attorney General, a method not found in any of the other 49 states. As of 2023, the incumbent Attorney General is Jonathan Skrmetti.

=== Intermediate Appellate Courts ===
The intermediate appellate courts of Tennessee include the court of appeals and the court of criminal appeals. The court of appeals hears cases appealed from probate, chancery, and circuit courts, whereas the court of criminal appeals hears cases appealed from circuit and criminal courts.

Both the Court of Appeals and the Court of Criminal Appeals have 12 judges.

=== Trial Courts ===
Trial courts in the state of Tennessee include probate courts, chancery courts, circuit courts, and criminal courts. The circuit courts, chancery and probate courts, and criminal courts each have 31 judicial districts.

=== Courts of Limited Jurisdiction ===
The courts of limited jurisdiction include juvenile courts, general sessions courts, and municipal courts.

=== District Attorneys ===
Map of Tennessee's judicial districts

Partisanship among Tennessee DAs as of 2026 Republican Democrat Independent

Tennessee elects district attorneys by judicial district. They are called "The Tennessee District Attorneys General Conference."

Judicial District	Counties	District Attorney
1st	Carter, Johnson, Unicoi, and Washington	Steven R. Finney (R)
2nd	Sullivan	Barry P. Staubus (R)
3rd	Greene, Hamblen, Hancock, and Hawkins	Dan E. Armstrong (R)
4th	Cocke, Grainger, Jefferson, and Sevier	Jimmy B. Dunn (R)
5th	Blount	Ryan Desmond (R)
6th	Knox	Charme Allen (R)
7th	Anderson	Dave S. Clark (Ind.)
8th	Campbell, Claiborne, Fentress, Scott, and Union	Jared R. Effler (Ind.)
9th	Loudon, Meigs, Morgan, and Roane	Russell Johnson (Ind.)
10th	Bradley, McMinn, Monroe, and Polk	Stephen Hatchett (R)
11th	Hamilton	Coty Wamp (R)
12th	Bledsoe, Franklin, Grundy, Marion, Rhea, and Sequatchie	Courtney Lynch (R)
13th	Clay, Cumberland, DeKalb, Overton, Pickett, Putnam, and White	Bryant C. Dunaway (R)
14th	Coffee	Craig Northcott (R)
15th	Jackson, Macon, Smith, Trousdale, and Wilson	Jason Lawson (R)
16th	Cannon and Rutherford	Jennings H. Jones (R)
17th	Bedford, Lincoln, Marshall, and Moore	Robert J. Carter (Ind.)
18th	Sumner	Tohmas Dean (R)
19th	Montgomery and Robertson	Robert Nash (R)
20th	Davidson	Glenn Funk (D)
21st	Hickman, Lewis, and Perry	Hans Schwendimann (R)
22nd	Giles, Lawrence, Maury, and Wayne	Brent A. Cooper (R)
23rd	Cheatham, Dickson, Houston, Humphreys, and Stewart	Ray Crouch, Jr. (R)
24th	Benton, Carroll, Decatur, Hardin, and Henry	Neil Thomson (R)
25th	Fayette, Hardeman, Lauderdale, McNairy, and Tipton	Mark E. Davidson (R)
26th	Chester, Henderson, and Madison	Jody Pickens (R)
27th	Obion and Weakley	Colin Johnson (Ind.)
28th	Crockett, Gibson, and Haywood	Frederick Agee (R)
29th	Dyer and Lake	Danny Goodman, Jr. (Ind.)
30th	Shelby	Steven J. Mulroy (D)
31st	Van Buren and Warren	Matt Colvard (Ind.)
32nd	Williamson	Stacey Edmondson (R)

== Local government ==
Tennessee is divided into political jurisdictions designated as counties, which derive all of their power from the state. Incorporated cities and towns are those that have been granted home rule, possessing a local government in the form of a city or town council.

=== County Mayors ===
Tennessee's current county mayors by partisanship

All 95 counties of Tennessee
Party	Republican	Independent	Democratic
By party (Note: This count includes mayors elected in partisan elections, while categorizing those elected in nonpartisan elections and those who ran as Independents as Independents.)	72	20 (Note: In some counties, mayors may be affiliated with a political party but were elected in nonpartisan races or ran as Independents. For the purposes of the map, these officials are classified as Independents.)	3
- Mayors by party as of 2026; Republican Independent Democratic

In Tennessee, the county mayor — sometimes referred to as the county executive in certain areas — serves as the chief executive officer of the county government. The county mayor is responsible for overseeing the administration of county departments, managing the county budget, and representing the county in official matters. County mayors are elected to four-year terms, with elections typically held during the August general elections. The structure of these elections varies by county; some counties conduct nonpartisan elections, in which candidates do not run with formal party affiliations, while others hold partisan elections, allowing candidates to be nominated and run under political parties.

== National government ==
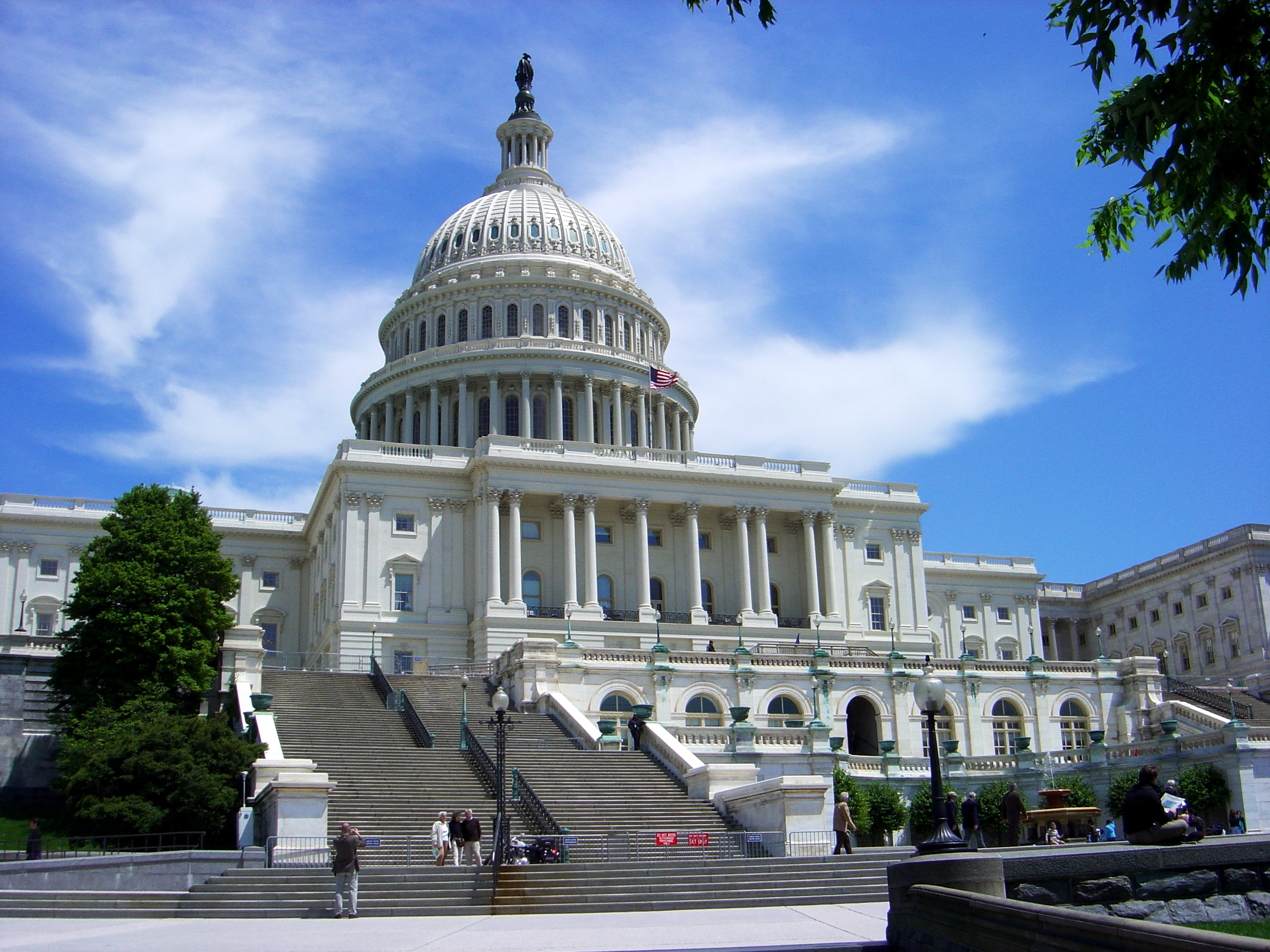
The United States Capitol in Washington, D.C.

Tennessee was the sixteenth state to ratify the United States Constitution, on June 21, 1796. Tennessee elects two United States Senators and nine members of the United States House of Representatives.

== See also ==
- Tennessee State Capitol in Nashville
- History of Tennessee
- Constitution of Tennessee
- State governments of the United States
- Political party strength in Tennessee
- Elections in Tennessee
