= 2016 Tennessee elections =

Tennessee state elections in 2016 were held on Tuesday, November 8, 2016. Primary elections for the United States House of Representatives, Tennessee Senate, and Tennessee House of Representatives, as well as various judicial retention elections, including elections for three Tennessee Supreme Court justices, were held on August 4, 2016.

== Presidential election ==
=== President of the United States ===
Final results by county: Trump: 50–60%; 60–70%; 70–80%; 80–90%; Clinton: 50–60%; 60–70%

In 2016, Tennessee was a stronghold for the Republican Party, and was considered a reliable "red state." Tennessee had 11 electoral votes in the Electoral College at the time. In the general election, Incumbent United States Republican businessman, Donald Trump won Tennessee with 60.72% of the vote.

The presidential primaries were held on March 1, 2016. Donald Trump won the Republican primary victory, with second place being Senator Ted Cruz of Texas. Former United States first lady, Hillary Clinton garnered the Democratic nomination, easily beating out Senator Bernie Sanders of Vermont.

=== Results ===
2016 United States presidential election in Tennessee
Party	Candidate	Votes	%
Republican	Donald Trump/Mike Pence	1,522,925	60.72%
Democratic	Hillary Clinton/Tim Kaine	870,695	34.72%
Independent	Gary Johnson	70,397	2.81%
Independent	Jill Stein	15,993	0.64%
Independent	Evan McMullin (write-in)	11,991	0.48%
Independent	Mike Smith	7,276	0.29%
Independent	Rocky De La Fuente	4,075	0.16%
Independent	Alyson Kennedy	2,877	0.12%
Write-in		1,798	0.07%
Total votes		2,508,027	100.00%

March 1, 2016, Primary Results

2016 Tennessee Democratic presidential primary
- March 1, 2016

67 Democratic National Convention delegates

Candidate	Hillary Clinton	Bernie Sanders
Home state	New York	Vermont
Delegate count	44	23
Popular vote	245,930	120,800
Percentage	66.07%	32.45%
- Results by county Clinton: 40–50% 50–60% 60–70% 70–80% 80–90% Sanders: 50–60%

Tennessee Democratic primary, March 1, 2016
Candidate	Popular vote		Estimated delegates		
Candidate	Count	Percentage	Pledged	Unpledged	Total
Hillary Clinton	245,930	66.07%	44	7	51
Bernie Sanders	120,800	32.45%	23	0	23
Martin O'Malley (withdrawn)	2,025	0.54%			
Uncommitted	3,467	0.93%	0	1	1
Total	372,222	100%	67	8	75

2016 Tennessee Republican presidential primary
- March 1, 2016

58 Republican National Convention delegates

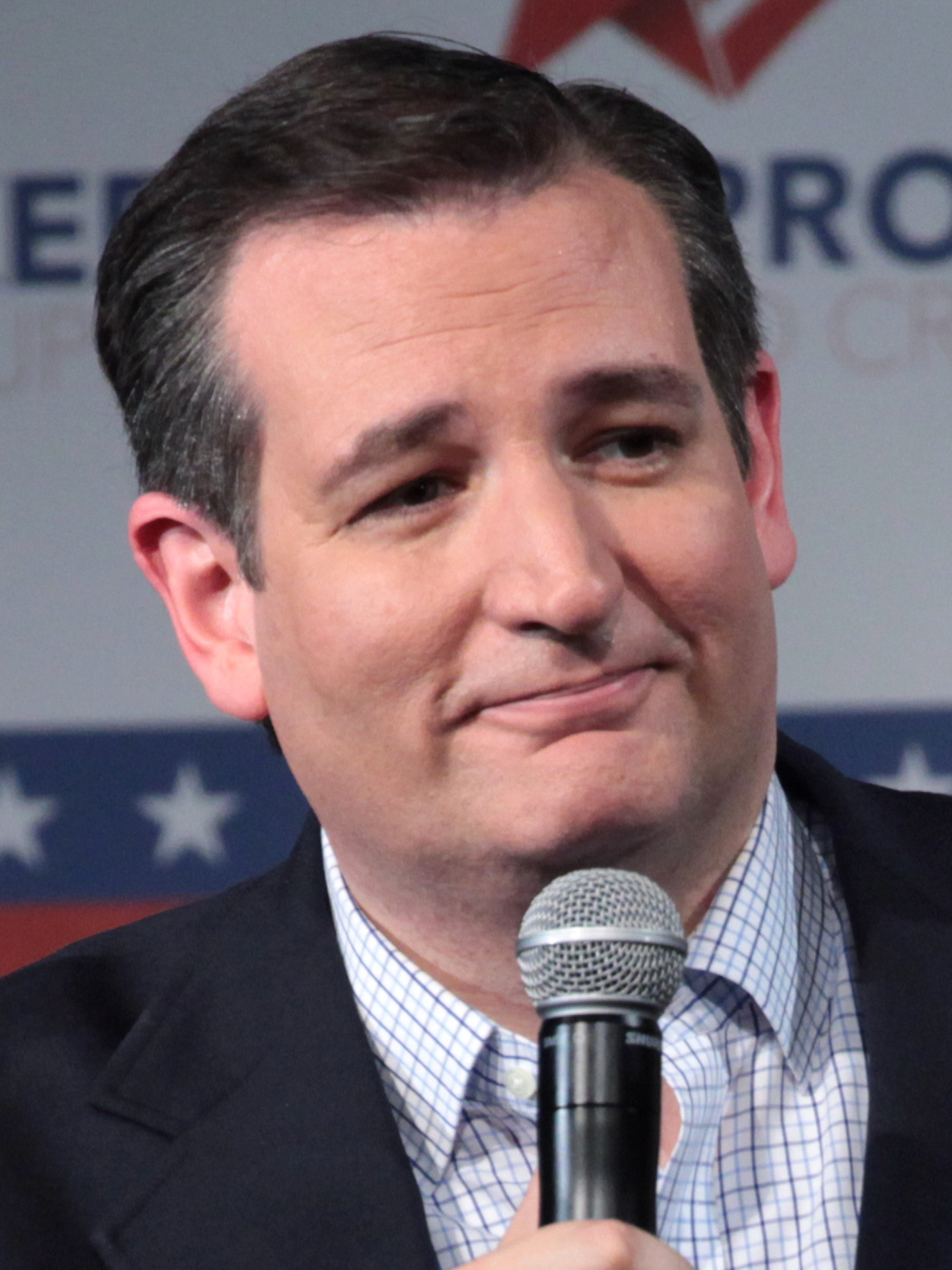

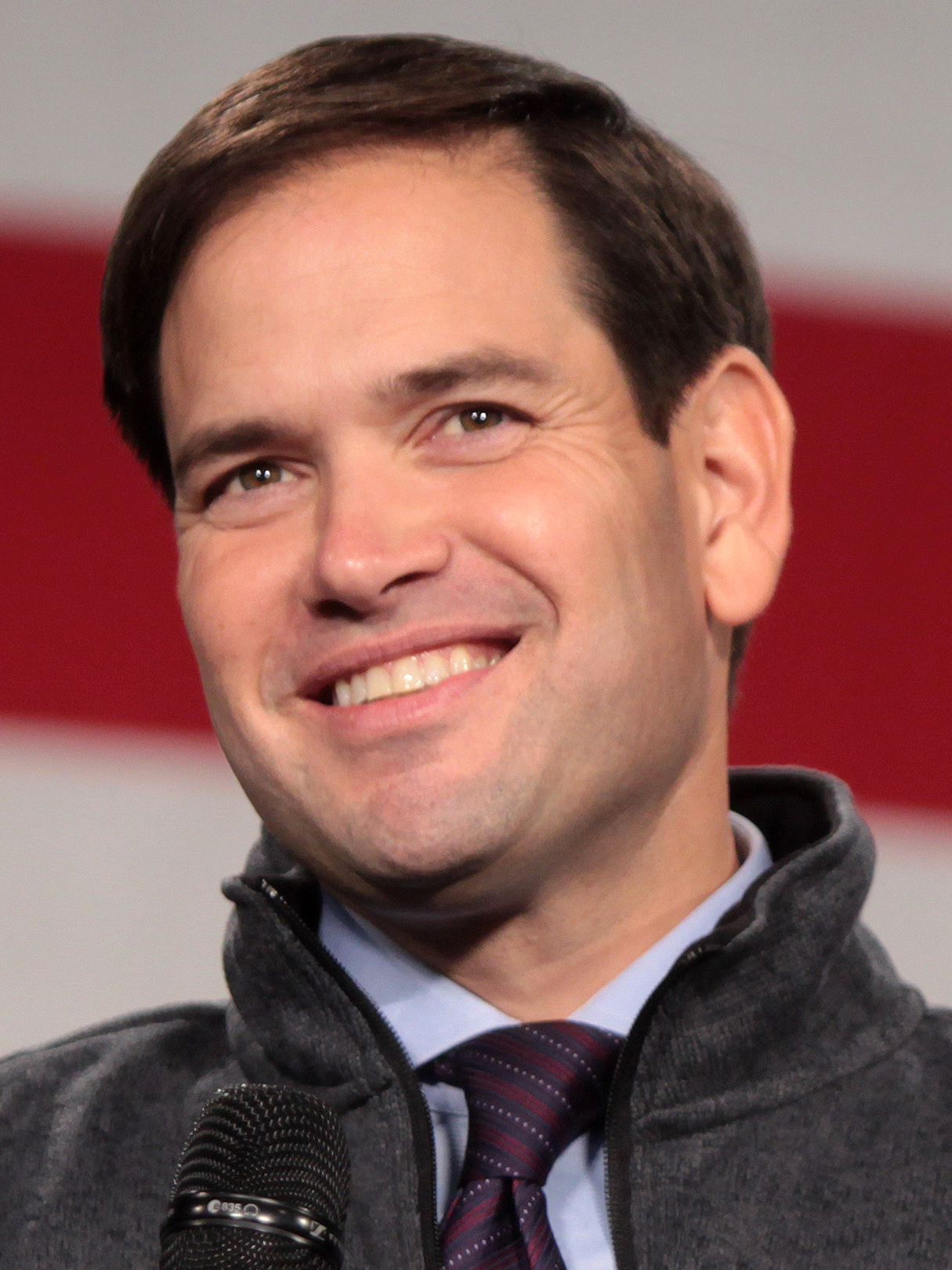

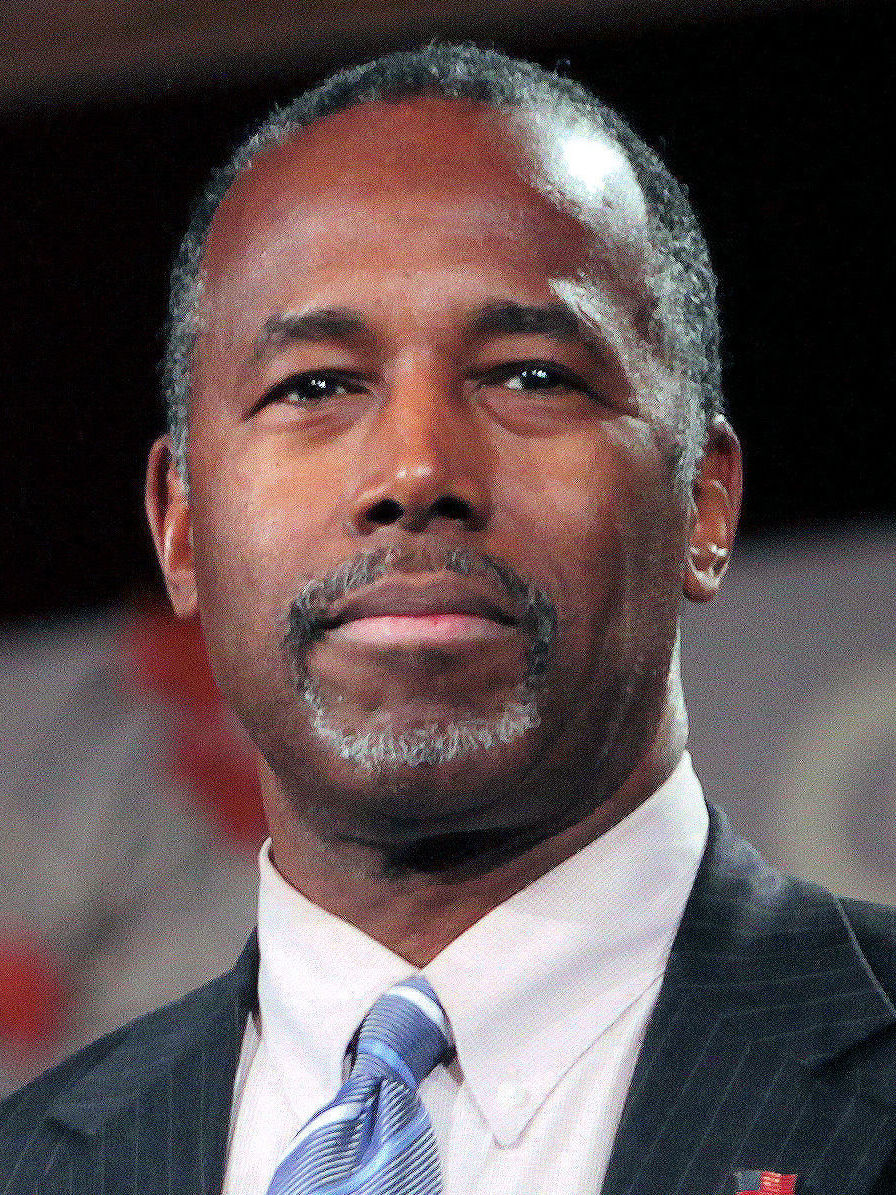

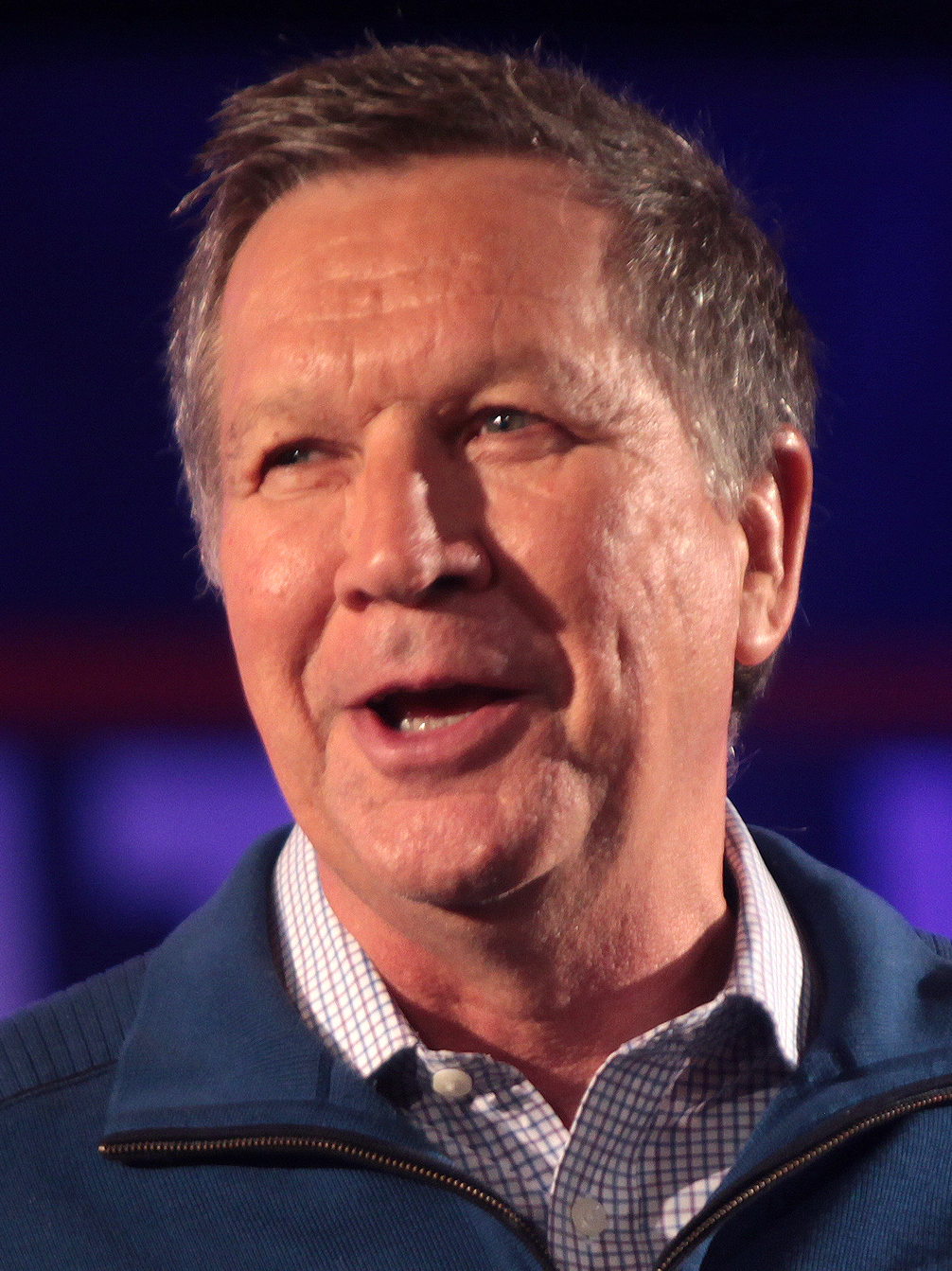
Candidate	Donald Trump	Ted Cruz	Marco Rubio
Home state	New York	Texas	Florida
Delegate count	33	16	9
Popular vote	333,180	211,471	181,274
Percentage	38.94%	24.71%	21.18%
Candidate	Ben Carson	John Kasich
Home state	Maryland	Ohio
Delegate count	0	0
Popular vote	64,951	45,301
Percentage	7.59%	5.29%
Results by county
Donald Trump 20–30% 30–40% 40–50% 50–60%	Marco Rubio 30–40%

Tennessee Republican primary, March 1, 2016
Candidate	Votes	Percentage	Actual delegate count		
Candidate	Votes	Percentage	Bound	Unbound	Total
Donald Trump	333,180	38.94%	33	0	33
Ted Cruz	211,471	24.71%	16	0	16
Marco Rubio	181,274	21.18%	9	0	9
Ben Carson	64,951	7.59%	0	0	0
John Kasich	45,301	5.29%	0	0	0
Jeb Bush (withdrawn)	9,551	1.12%	0	0	0
Mike Huckabee (withdrawn)	2,415	0.28%	0	0	0
Rand Paul (withdrawn)	2,350	0.27%	0	0	0
Uncommitted	1,849	0.22%	0	0	0
Chris Christie (withdrawn)	1,256	0.15%	0	0	0
Carly Fiorina (withdrawn)	715	0.08%	0	0	0
Rick Santorum (withdrawn)	710	0.08%	0	0	0
Jim Gilmore (withdrawn)	267	0.03%	0	0	0
Lindsey Graham (withdrawn)	253	0.03%	0	0	0
George Pataki (withdrawn)	186	0.02%	0	0	0
Unprojected delegates:			0	0	0
Total:	855,729	100.00%	58	0	58
Source: The Green Papers

== United States Congress ==
=== House of Representatives ===
District results: Republican: 60–70%; 70–80%; Democratic: 60–70%; 70–80%

Tennessee elected nine U.S. representatives, each representing one of Tennessee's nine congressional districts.

=== Results ===
District	Republican		Democratic		Others		Total		Result
District	Votes	%	Votes	%	Votes	%	Votes	%	Result
District 1	198,293	78.37%	39,024	15.42%	15,708	6.21%	253,025	100.0%	Republican hold
District 2	212,455	75.65%	68,401	24.35%	0	0.00%	280,856	100.0%	Republican hold
District 3	176,613	66.39%	76,727	28.84%	12,666	4.76%	266,006	100.0%	Republican hold
District 4	165,796	65.03%	89,141	34.97%	0	0.00%	254,937	100.0%	Republican hold
District 5	102,433	37.45%	171,111	62.55%	0	0.00%	273,544	100.0%	Democratic hold
District 6	202,234	71.09%	61,995	21.79%	20,261	7.12%	284,490	100.0%	Republican hold
District 7	200,407	72.22%	65,226	23.50%	11,880	4.28%	277,513	100.0%	Republican hold
District 8	194,386	68.75%	70,925	25.09%	17,422	6.16%	282,733	100.0%	Republican hold
District 9	41,123	18.87%	171,631	78.75%	5,203	2.39%	217,957	100.0%	Democratic hold
Total	1,493,740	62.47%	814,181	34.05%	83,140	3.48%	2,391,061	100.0%	

Popular vote
Republican	62.47%
Democratic	34.05%
Other	3.48%

House seats
Republican	77.78%
Democratic	22.22%

== State legislature ==
=== State Senate ===
Results by senate districts

Winners:

Republican hold
Democratic hold
No election

Elections for 16 of the 33 seats in Tennessee's State Senate were held on November 8, 2016.

After this election, Republicans had 28 seats while Democrats had 5 seats.

Party	Candidates	Votes		Seats				
Party	Candidates	No.	%	Before	Up	Won	After	+/–
Republican	15	802,362	80.82	28	15	15	28	Steady
Democratic	6	172,753	17.40	5	1	1	5	Steady
Independent	1	17,640	1.78	0	0	0	0	Steady
Write-in	1	1	0.00	0	0	0	0	Steady
Total		992,756	100	33	18	18	33	Steady

Popular vote
Republican	80.82%
Democratic	17.40%
Other	1.77%

Senate seats up for election
Republican	93.75%
Democratic	6.25%

=== State House of Representatives ===
Results by State House districts

Winners:

Republican hold
Democratic hold
Republican gain
Democratic gain

The election of all 99 seats in the Tennessee House of Representatives occurred on November 8, 2016.

Republicans won 74 seats, while Democrats won 25 seats. Republicans gained a seat during this election.

== Supreme Court ==
=== Retention elections (August 4, 2016) ===
All incumbent Tennessee Supreme Court Justices won their retention elections, getting eight more years.

Tennessee Supreme Court Associate Justice, Roger A. Page retention election
Choice	Votes	%
For	302,145	70.88
Against	124,118	29.12
Total	426,263	100.00

Tennessee Supreme Court Associate Justice, Holly M. Kirby retention election
Choice	Votes	%
For	303,275	71.00
Against	123,846	29.00
Total	427,121	100.00

Tennessee Supreme Court Associate Justice, Jeffrey S. Bivins retention election
Choice	Votes	%
For	303,972	70.79
Against	125,441	29.21
Total	429,413	100.00

== See also ==
- Elections in Tennessee
- Political party strength in Tennessee
- Tennessee Democratic Party
- Tennessee Republican Party
- Government of Tennessee
- Tennessee Supreme Court
- 2016 United States elections
