= 2022 Tennessee gubernatorial election =

- November 8, 2022
- Turnout: 38.61% ▼15.85 pp
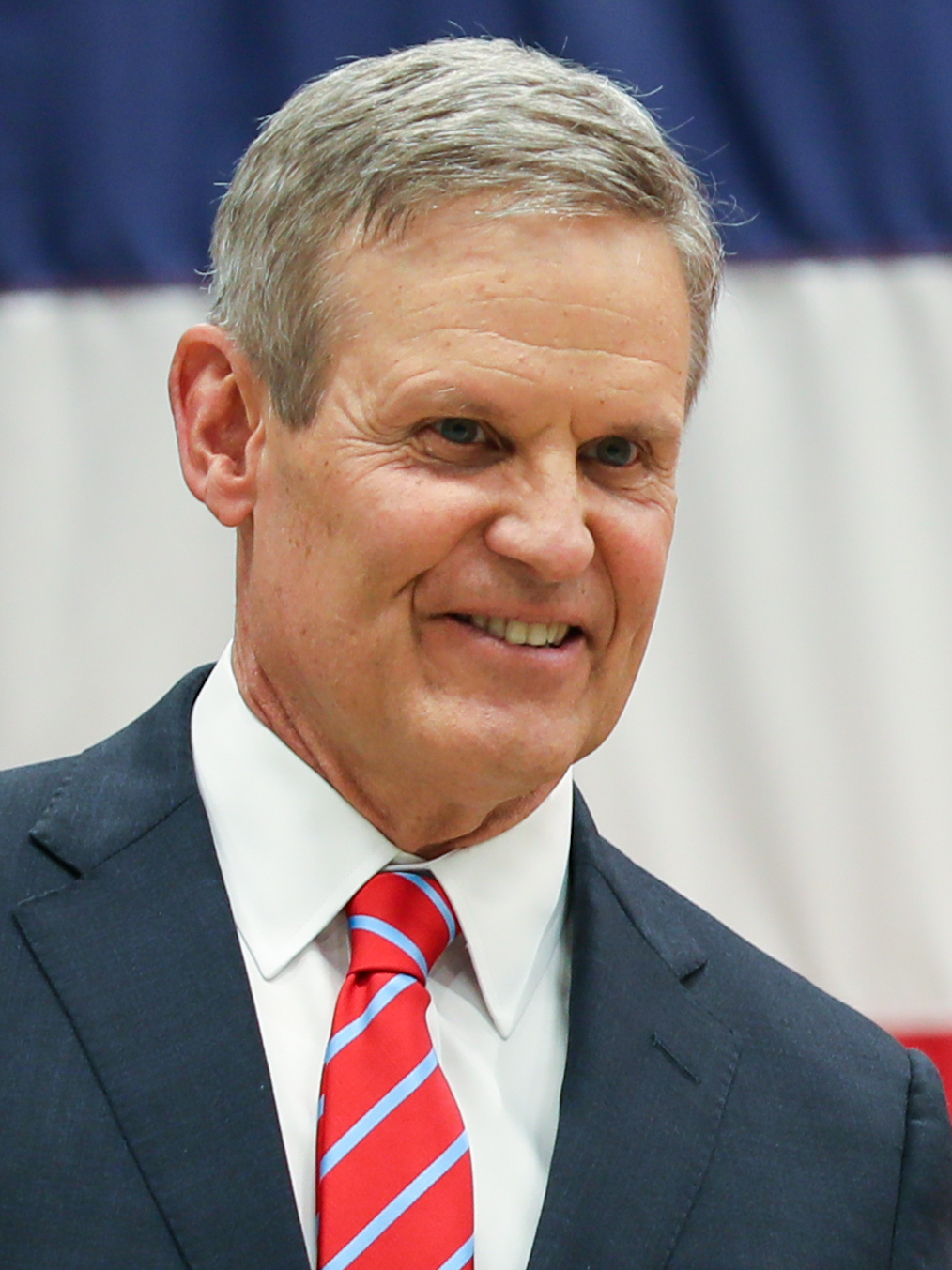

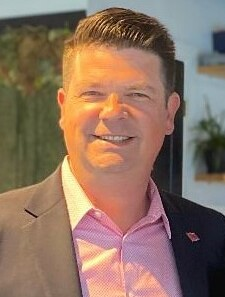
| Nominee | Bill Lee | Jason Martin |
| Party | Republican | Democratic |
| Popular vote | 1,129,390 | 572,818 |
| Percentage | 64.91% | 32.92% |
- Lee: 40–50% 50–60% 60–70% 70–80% 80–90% >90% Martin: 40–50% 50–60% 60–70% 70–80% 80–90% No data
Governor before election
Bill Lee
Republican
Elected Governor
Bill Lee
Republican

The 2022 Tennessee gubernatorial election took place on November 8, 2022, to elect the governor of Tennessee, alongside other state and local elections. Incumbent Republican Governor Bill Lee was elected to a second term with 64.9% of the vote, defeating his Democratic challenger Jason Martin. Lee improved on his performance from 2018.

The primary elections took place on August 4, 2022, with Lee and Martin winning their respective parties' nominations.

During the general election, Lee flipped reliably Democratic Haywood County, home to Brownsville. It is one of only two remaining counties in Tennessee, along with Shelby County, with a majority African-American population. Haywood County had not voted Republican on a presidential level since 1972. Martin won only Shelby and Davidson counties. This was the first time in state history that Davidson County did not vote for the winner in a gubernatorial re-election since Tennessee began allowing governors to serve for two consecutive terms.

Voter turnout for the 2022 midterm elections in Tennessee was the lowest it had been in nearly a decade, with only 38.6% of Tennessee's registered voters turning out. This was far below the 2020 presidential election in Tennessee, which saw a turnout of 69.3%. The last time turnout was this low in Tennessee was in the 2014 midterm elections. Tennessee's neighboring state Alabama saw a significant drop in voter turnout as well.

Bill Lee was sworn in for his second term on January 21, 2023, at War Memorial Plaza in downtown Nashville. In his inaugural address, he outlined priorities including transportation and energy planning related to the state’s growth, environmental issues, and reforms within the Department of Children’s Services, such as staffing and foster care and adoption systems. He also referenced workforce development through vocational and technical education and called for civility in political discourse.

== Republican primary ==
=== Candidates ===
==== Nominee ====
- Bill Lee, incumbent governor

==== Disqualified ====
- Curtis Carney, business owner
- Tyler Hagerman
- Patricia Morrison

==== Declined ====
- Andy Ogles, mayor of Maury County (successfully ran for U.S. House)

=== Endorsements ===
Bill Lee

U.S. executive branch officials

- Nikki Haley, former U.S. Ambassador to the United Nations (2017–2018)
- Donald Trump, 45th president of the United States (2017–2021)

=== Results ===
Republican primary results
| Party | Candidate | Votes | % |
|---|---|---|---|
| Republican | Bill Lee (incumbent) | 494,362 | 100.00% |
| Total votes | | 494,362 | 100.00% |

== Democratic primary ==
=== Candidates ===
==== Nominee ====
- Jason Martin, pulmonologist and critical care specialist at Sumner Regional Medical Center and former Meharry Medical College professor

==== Eliminated in primary ====
- Carnita Atwater, leader of New Chicago Community Development Corporation in Northern Memphis
- J. B. Smiley Jr., Memphis city councilor

==== Withdrew ====
- Casey Nicholson, minister

==== Declined ====
- Gloria Johnson, state representative (endorsed Jason Martin)

=== Endorsements ===
J. B. Smiley Jr.

U.S. representatives

- Steve Cohen, U.S. representative for Tennessee's 9th congressional district (2007–present)

Local officials

- Lee Harris, mayor of Shelby County (2018–present) and former Minority Leader of the Tennessee Senate from the 29th district (2015–2018)
- W. W. Herenton, former mayor of Memphis (1992–2009)

=== Results ===
Results by county: Martin: 30–40%; 40–50%; 50–60%; 60–70%; Smiley: 30–40%; 40–50%; 50–60%; 60–70%; Atwater: 30–40%

Democratic primary results
| Party | Candidate | Votes | % |
|---|---|---|---|
| Democratic | Jason Martin | 101,552 | 39.39% |
| Democratic | J.B. Smiley Jr. | 100,062 | 38.81% |
| Democratic | Carnita Atwater | 56,227 | 21.81% |
| Total votes | | 257,841 | 100.00% |

== Independents ==
=== Candidates ===
==== Declared ====
- Constance Every, nonprofit founder
- John Gentry, accountant
- Basil Marceaux, businessman and perennial candidate
- Alfred O'Neil
- Deborah Rouse, candidate for president of the United States in 2020
- Michael Scantland, sales manager
- Rick Tyler, perennial candidate (also ran for U.S. House)
- Charles Van Morgan, small business owner

==== Disqualified ====
- Lemichael DaShaun-Wilson
- Hosie Holomon III
- Wendell Jackson
- Jake Johns

== General election ==
=== Predictions ===
| Source | Ranking | As of |
|---|---|---|
| The Cook Political Report | Solid R | March 4, 2022 |
| Inside Elections | Solid R | July 22, 2022 |
| Sabato's Crystal Ball | Safe R | June 29, 2022 |
| Politico | Solid R | April 1, 2022 |
| RCP | Safe R | January 10, 2022 |
| Fox News | Solid R | May 12, 2022 |
| 538 | Solid R | August 4, 2022 |
| Elections Daily | Safe R | November 7, 2022 |

=== Fundraising ===
Campaign finance reports as of July 5, 2022
| Candidate | Raised | Spent | Cash on hand |
|---|---|---|---|
| Bill Lee (R) | $3,516,828 | $3,316,034 | $375,465 |
| Jason Martin (D) | $187,424 | $495,649 | $160,736 |
Source: Tennessee Registry of Election Finance

=== Post-primary endorsements ===
Bill Lee (R)

Organizations

- National Federation of Independent Business
- National Right to Life
- NRA Political Victory Fund
Jason Martin (D)

Labor unions

- AFL–CIO
- United Mine Workers

=== Polling ===
| Poll source | Date(s) administered | Sample size (Note: Key: A – all adults RV – registered voters LV – likely voters V – unclear) | Margin of error | Bill Lee (R) | Jason Martin (D) | Other | Undecided |
|---|---|---|---|---|---|---|---|
| RABA Research | July 21–31, 2022 | 549 (LV) | ± 4.2% | 52% | 28% | 6% | 14% |

Hypothetical polling

Bill Lee vs. generic opponent

| Poll source | Date(s) administered | Sample size | Margin of error | Bill Lee (R) | Generic Opponent | Undecided |
|---|---|---|---|---|---|---|
| Vanderbilt University | April 26 – May 14, 2022 | 1,000 (RV) | ± 3.8% | 48% | 39% | 12% |

=== Results ===
State Senate district results

State House district results

2022 Tennessee gubernatorial election
| Party | Candidate | Votes | % | ±% |
|---|---|---|---|---|
| Republican | Bill Lee (incumbent) | 1,129,390 | 64.91% | +5.55 |
| Democratic | Jason Martin | 572,818 | 32.92% | −5.63 |
| Independent | John Gentry | 15,395 | 0.89% | N/A |
| Independent | Constance Every | 10,277 | 0.59% | N/A |
| Independent | Deborah Rouse | 3,772 | 0.22% | N/A |
| Independent | Rick Tyler | 2,380 | 0.14% | N/A |
| Independent | Charles Van Morgan | 1,862 | 0.11% | N/A |
| Independent | Basil Marceaux | 1,568 | 0.09% | N/A |
| Independent | Alfred O'Neil | 1,216 | 0.07% | N/A |
| Independent | Michael Scantland | 815 | 0.05% | N/A |
| Write-In | Lemichael D. Wilson | 386 | 0.02% | N/A |
| Write-In | Charles Carney | 2 | 0.00% | N/A |
| Write-In | Stephen C. Maxwell | 1 | 0.00% | N/A |
| Write-In | Kameron Parker Scott | 0 | 0.00% | N/A |
| Total votes | | 1,739,882 | 100.00% | |
| Turnout | | 1,756,397 | 38.61% | −15.85% |
| Registered electors | | 4,549,183 | | |
| Republican hold | | | | |

==== By county ====
| County | Bill Lee Republican | | Jason Martin Democratic | | Other votes | | Total votes |
| County | % | # | % | # | % | # | Total votes |
|---|---|---|---|---|---|---|---|
| Anderson | 65.80% | 14,003 | 32.11% | 6,832 | 2.09% | 445 | 21,280 |
| Bedford | 79.30% | 8,401 | 18.27% | 1,936 | 2.43% | 257 | 10,594 |
| Benton | 79.14% | 3,247 | 18.43% | 756 | 2.43% | 100 | 4,103 |
| Bledsoe | 86.06% | 2,933 | 12.27% | 418 | 1.67% | 57 | 3,408 |
| Blount | 74.41% | 29,470 | 23.52% | 9,316 | 2.07% | 820 | 39,606 |
| Bradley | 81.97% | 20,655 | 16.26% | 4,096 | 1.77% | 447 | 25,198 |
| Campbell | 81.96% | 6,118 | 15.85% | 1,197 | 2.19% | 165 | 7,550 |
| Cannon | 80.74% | 3,082 | 17.50% | 668 | 1.76% | 67 | 3,817 |
| Carroll | 80.23% | 5,733 | 17.74% | 1,268 | 2.03% | 145 | 7,146 |
| Carter | 80.10% | 11,602 | 17.78% | 2,575 | 2.12% | 307 | 14,484 |
| Cheatham | 71.27% | 8,309 | 26.92% | 3,138 | 1.81% | 211 | 11,658 |
| Chester | 83.54% | 3,756 | 13.83% | 622 | 2.62% | 118 | 4,496 |
| Claiborne | 83.99% | 5,652 | 14.18% | 954 | 1.83% | 123 | 6,729 |
| Clay | 80.03% | 1,451 | 16.93% | 307 | 3.04% | 55 | 1,813 |
| Cocke | 81.17% | 6,618 | 15.95% | 1,300 | 2.88% | 235 | 8,153 |
| Coffee | 77.13% | 10,529 | 20.59% | 2,811 | 2.28% | 311 | 13,651 |
| Crockett | 82.30% | 2,734 | 16.23% | 539 | 1.48% | 49 | 3,322 |
| Cumberland | 82.38% | 17,864 | 16.16% | 3,505 | 1.46% | 315 | 21,684 |
| Davidson | 34.24% | 60,900 | 63.38% | 112,708 | 2.38% | 4,229 | 177,837 |
| Decatur | 80.65% | 2,713 | 17.72% | 596 | 1.63% | 55 | 3,364 |
| DeKalb | 80.07% | 4,118 | 17.71% | 911 | 2.22% | 114 | 5,143 |
| Dickson | 73.73% | 9,970 | 24.07% | 3,255 | 2.20% | 297 | 13,522 |
| Dyer | 80.61% | 6,791 | 16.81% | 1,416 | 2.58% | 217 | 8,424 |
| Fayette | 75.93% | 10,868 | 22.44% | 3,212 | 1.63% | 234 | 14,314 |
| Fentress | 86.69% | 4,559 | 11.12% | 585 | 2.19% | 115 | 5,259 |
| Franklin | 75.05% | 8,643 | 22.93% | 2,641 | 2.02% | 232 | 11,516 |
| Gibson | 76.61% | 9,640 | 21.21% | 2,669 | 2.18% | 274 | 12,583 |
| Giles | 76.23% | 5,832 | 20.68% | 1,582 | 3.09% | 237 | 7,651 |
| Grainger | 85.28% | 4,588 | 13.12% | 706 | 1.60% | 86 | 5,380 |
| Greene | 79.26% | 13,574 | 17.83% | 3,054 | 2.91% | 498 | 16,951 |
| Grundy | 80.82% | 2,735 | 15.90% | 538 | 3.28% | 111 | 3,384 |
| Hamblen | 78.86% | 10,335 | 19.01% | 2,492 | 2.13% | 279 | 13,126 |
| Hamilton | 60.02% | 60,647 | 38.46% | 38,862 | 1.52% | 1,542 | 101,051 |
| Hancock | 84.60% | 1,110 | 12.58% | 165 | 2.82% | 37 | 1,312 |
| Hardeman | 62.41% | 3,486 | 35.50% | 1,983 | 2.09% | 117 | 5,586 |
| Hardin | 85.93% | 5,606 | 12.45% | 812 | 1.62% | 106 | 6,524 |
| Hawkins | 82.42% | 11,669 | 15.56% | 2,203 | 2.02% | 286 | 14,158 |
| Haywood | 51.14% | 2,011 | 47.30% | 1,860 | 1.56% | 61 | 3,932 |
| Henderson | 85.61% | 5,551 | 12.68% | 822 | 1.71% | 111 | 6,484 |
| Henry | 78.52% | 6,674 | 18.87% | 1,604 | 2.61% | 222 | 8,500 |
| Hickman | 78.76% | 4,577 | 19.41% | 1,128 | 1.83% | 106 | 5,811 |
| Houston | 74.25% | 1,837 | 23.00% | 569 | 2.75% | 68 | 2,474 |
| Humphreys | 74.63% | 3,344 | 22.85% | 1,024 | 2.52% | 113 | 4,481 |
| Jackson | 75.80% | 2,415 | 19.99% | 637 | 4.21% | 134 | 3,186 |
| Jefferson | 81.52% | 10,806 | 15.90% | 2,107 | 2.58% | 342 | 13,255 |
| Johnson | 85.05% | 4,415 | 13.25% | 688 | 1.70% | 88 | 5,191 |
| Knox | 59.95% | 76,880 | 38.32% | 49,140 | 1.73% | 2,222 | 128,242 |
| Lake | 78.69% | 912 | 17.69% | 205 | 3.62% | 42 | 1,159 |
| Lauderdale | 69.81% | 3,346 | 27.56% | 1,321 | 2.63% | 126 | 4,793 |
| Lawrence | 81.96% | 8,276 | 15.34% | 1,549 | 2.70% | 272 | 10,097 |
| Lewis | 80.09% | 2,723 | 18.03% | 613 | 1.88% | 64 | 3,400 |
| Lincoln | 81.89% | 7,452 | 15.45% | 1,406 | 2.66% | 242 | 9,100 |
| Loudon | 78.15% | 15,285 | 19.43% | 3,801 | 2.42% | 473 | 19,559 |
| Macon | 85.13% | 4,140 | 12.03% | 585 | 2.84% | 138 | 4,863 |
| Madison | 63.77% | 15,357 | 34.24% | 8,246 | 1.99% | 479 | 24,082 |
| Marion | 77.23% | 5,947 | 20.91% | 1,610 | 1.86% | 143 | 7,700 |
| Marshall | 75.99% | 6,734 | 21.00% | 1,861 | 3.01% | 267 | 8,862 |
| Maury | 72.26% | 22,198 | 25.75% | 7,910 | 1.99% | 610 | 30,718 |
| McMinn | 80.35% | 10,371 | 14.39% | 1,858 | 5.26% | 679 | 12,908 |
| McNairy | 83.06% | 5,864 | 14.67% | 1,036 | 2.27% | 160 | 7,060 |
| Meigs | 82.21% | 2,703 | 14.93% | 491 | 2.86% | 94 | 3,288 |
| Monroe | 82.93% | 9,830 | 14.75% | 1,748 | 2.23% | 275 | 11,853 |
| Montgomery | 60.22% | 24,813 | 36.38% | 14,988 | 3.40% | 1,400 | 41,201 |
| Moore | 83.33% | 1,725 | 14.59% | 302 | 2.08% | 43 | 2,070 |
| Morgan | 83.97% | 3,844 | 13.63% | 624 | 2.40% | 110 | 4,578 |
| Obion | 82.63% | 6,418 | 15.10% | 1,173 | 2.27% | 176 | 7,767 |
| Overton | 78.45% | 4,805 | 18.73% | 1,147 | 2.82% | 173 | 6,125 |
| Perry | 80.22% | 1,549 | 17.56% | 339 | 2.22% | 43 | 1,931 |
| Pickett | 80.06% | 1,542 | 16.15% | 311 | 3.79% | 73 | 1,929 |
| Polk | 83.32% | 4,000 | 14.83% | 712 | 1.85% | 89 | 4,801 |
| Putnam | 72.43% | 14,217 | 24.84% | 4,875 | 2.73% | 536 | 19,628 |
| Rhea | 85.11% | 6,551 | 13.42% | 1,033 | 1.47% | 113 | 7,697 |
| Roane | 75.23% | 11,871 | 21.15% | 3,337 | 3.62% | 572 | 15,780 |
| Robertson | 75.97% | 14,066 | 21.86% | 4,048 | 2.17% | 400 | 18,514 |
| Rutherford | 62.00% | 46,575 | 35.87% | 26,948 | 2.13% | 1,604 | 75,127 |
| Scott | 87.56% | 3,394 | 10.19% | 395 | 2.25% | 87 | 3,876 |
| Sequatchie | 83.92% | 3,643 | 13.87% | 602 | 2.21% | 96 | 4,341 |
| Sevier | 80.35% | 18,314 | 16.75% | 3,818 | 2.90% | 660 | 22,792 |
| Shelby | 43.20% | 86,384 | 54.51% | 108,995 | 2.29% | 4,583 | 199,962 |
| Smith | 79.52% | 4,205 | 17.53% | 927 | 2.95% | 156 | 5,288 |
| Stewart | 79.55% | 3,167 | 17.76% | 707 | 2.69% | 107 | 3,981 |
| Sullivan | 77.90% | 32,897 | 20.78% | 8,777 | 1.32% | 556 | 42,230 |
| Sumner | 71.57% | 37,466 | 26.12% | 13,672 | 2.31% | 1,209 | 52,347 |
| Tipton | 76.69% | 11,487 | 20.58% | 3,083 | 2.73% | 409 | 14,979 |
| Trousdale | 77.39% | 1,660 | 20.93% | 449 | 1.68% | 36 | 2,145 |
| Unicoi | 80.66% | 4,238 | 17.32% | 910 | 2.02% | 106 | 5,254 |
| Union | 82.90% | 3,456 | 14.99% | 625 | 2.11% | 88 | 4,169 |
| Van Buren | 82.35% | 1,563 | 14.70% | 279 | 2.95% | 56 | 1,898 |
| Warren | 75.29% | 6,668 | 22.16% | 1,963 | 2.55% | 226 | 8,857 |
| Washington | 69.42% | 24,330 | 28.66% | 10,046 | 1.92% | 671 | 35,047 |
| Wayne | 86.59% | 3,094 | 11.14% | 398 | 2.27% | 81 | 3,573 |
| Weakley | 78.94% | 6,417 | 18.32% | 1,489 | 2.74% | 223 | 8,129 |
| White | 82.41% | 5,744 | 15.42% | 1,075 | 2.17% | 151 | 6,970 |
| Williamson | 68.06% | 58,132 | 30.57% | 26,116 | 1.37% | 1,169 | 85,417 |
| Wilson | 70.69% | 31,496 | 27.40% | 12,208 | 1.91% | 848 | 44,552 |

Counties that flipped from Democratic to Republican

- Haywood (largest city: Brownsville)

==== By congressional district ====
Lee won eight of nine congressional districts.

| District | Lee | Martin | Representative |
|---|---|---|---|
| 1st | 78.03% | 19.86% | Diana Harshbarger |
| 2nd | 66.78% | 31.33% | Tim Burchett |
| 3rd | 68.80% | 29.09% | Chuck Fleischmann |
| 4th | 72.06% | 25.68% | Scott DesJarlais |
| 5th | 58.63% | 39.55% | Jim Cooper (117th Congress) |
| 5th | 58.63% | 39.55% | Andy Ogles (118th Congress) |
| 6th | 65.75% | 31.90% | John W. Rose |
| 7th | 59.59% | 37.86% | Mark E. Green |
| 8th | 73.12% | 24.99% | David Kustoff |
| 9th | 32.63% | 64.58% | Steve Cohen |

== See also ==
- Elections in Tennessee
- Political party strength in Tennessee
- Tennessee Democratic Party
- Tennessee Republican Party
- Government of Tennessee
- 2022 Tennessee elections
- 2022 United States elections
