= 2014 Tennessee elections =

Tennessee state elections in 2014 were held on Tuesday, November 4, 2014. Primary elections for the United States Senate, United States House of Representatives, governorship, Tennessee Senate, and Tennessee House of Representatives, as well as various judicial retention elections, including elections for three Tennessee Supreme Court justices, were held on August 7, 2014. There were also four constitutional amendments to the Constitution of Tennessee on the November 4 ballot.

== United States Congress ==
=== Senate ===
Final results by county: Alexander: 40–50%; 50–60%; 60–70%; 70–80%; Ball: 50–60%

Incumbent Republican U.S. senator Lamar Alexander defeated Democrat Gordon Ball and was re-elected to a third term in office with 61.9% of the vote against 31.9%.

=== Results ===
2014 United States Senate election in Tennessee
Party	Candidate	Votes	%	±%
Republican	Lamar Alexander (incumbent)	850,087	61.87%	−3.27%
Democratic	Gordon Ball	437,848	31.87%	+0.23%
Constitution	Joe Wilmoth	36,088	2.63%	N/A
Green	Martin Pleasant	12,570	0.91%	N/A
Independent	Tom Emerson Jr.	11,157	0.81%	N/A
Independent	Danny Page	7,713	0.56%	N/A
Independent	Rick Tyler	5,759	0.42%	N/A
Independent	Joshua James	5,678	0.41%	N/A
Independent	Bartholomew J. Phillips	2,386	0.17%	N/A
Independent	Edmund L. Gauthier	2,314	0.17%	N/A
Independent	Eric Schechter	1,673	0.12%	N/A
Independent	Choudhury Salekin	787	0.06%	N/A
Write-in		5	0.00%	N/A
Total votes		1,374,065	100.00%	N/A
Republican hold				

August 7, 2014, Primary Results

Democratic primary results
Party	Candidate	Votes	%
Democratic	Gordon Ball	87,829	36.45%
Democratic	Terry Adams	85,794	35.61%
Democratic	Gary Gene Davis	42,549	17.66%
Democratic	Larry Crim	24,777	10.28%
Total votes		240,949	100.00%

Republican primary election
Party	Candidate	Votes	%
Republican	Lamar Alexander (incumbent)	331,705	49.65%
Republican	Joe Carr	271,324	40.61%
Republican	George Shea Flinn	34,668	5.19%
Republican	Christian Agnew	11,320	1.69%
Republican	Brenda S. Lenard	7,908	1.18%
Republican	John D. King	7,748	1.16%
Republican	Erin Kent Magee	3,366	0.52%
Total votes		668,039	100.00%

=== House of Representatives ===
District results: Republican: 50–60%; 60–70%; 70–80%; 80–90%; Democratic: 60–70%; 70–80%

Tennessee elected nine U.S. Representatives, each representing one of Tennessee's nine Congressional Districts.

=== Results ===
District	Republican		Democratic		Others		Total		Result
District	Votes	%	Votes	%	Votes	%	Votes	%	Result
District 1	115,533	82.84%	0	0.00%	23,937	17.16%	139,470	100.0%	Republican hold
District 2	120,883	72.49%	37,612	22.56%	8,256	1.00%	166,751	100.0%	Republican hold
District 3	97,344	62.36%	53,983	34.58%	4,770	3.06%	156,097	100.0%	Republican hold
District 4	84,815	58.32%	51,357	35.32%	9,246	6.36%	145,418	100.0%	Republican hold
District 5	55,078	35.70%	96,148	62.32%	3,050	1.98%	154,276	100.0%	Democratic hold
District 6	115,231	71.09%	37,232	22.97%	9,634	5.94%	162,097	100.0%	Republican hold
District 7	110,534	70.00%	42,280	26.77%	5,093	3.23%	157,907	100.0%	Republican hold
District 8	122,255	70.83%	42,433	24.59%	7,907	4.58%	172,595	100.0%	Republican hold
District 9	27,173	23.31%	87,376	74.97%	2,001	1.72%	116,550	100.0%	Democratic hold
Total	848,846	61.91%	448,421	32.70%	73,894	5.39%	1,371,161	100.0%	

Popular vote
Republican	61.91%
Democratic	32.70%
Other	5.39%

House seats
Republican	77.78%
Democratic	22.22%

== Gubernatorial ==
Final results by county: Haslam: 50–60%; 60–70%; 70–80%; 80–90%

Incumbent Republican governor Bill Haslam was re-elected to a second term with 70.3% of the vote, defeating his Democratic challenger Charles Brown. Improving on his performance from 2010, Haslam also carried every county in the state

=== Results ===
2014 Tennessee gubernatorial election
Party	Candidate	Votes	%	±%
Republican	Bill Haslam (incumbent)	951,796	70.31%	+5.28%
Democratic	Charles Brown	309,237	22.84%	−10.24%
Independent	John Jay Hooker	30,579	2.26%	N/A
Constitution	Shaun Crowell	26,580	1.96%	N/A
Green	Isa Infante	18,570	1.37%	N/A
Independent	Steve Coburn	8,612	0.64%	N/A
Independent	Daniel Lewis	8,321	0.62%	N/A
n/a	Write-ins	33	0.00%	0.00%
Total votes		1,353,728	100.0%	N/A
Republican hold				

August 7, 2014, primary results

County results

Democratic primary results
Party	Candidate	Votes	%
Democratic	Charles V. "Charlie" Brown	95,114	41.71
Democratic	Wm. H. "John" McKamey	59,200	25.96
Democratic	Kennedy Spellman Johnson	55,718	24.44
Democratic	Ron Noonan	17,993	7.89
Total votes		228,025	100

Republican primary results
Party	Candidate	Votes	%
Republican	Bill Haslam (incumbent)	570,997	87.68
Republican	Mark "Coonrippy" Brown	44,165	6.78
Republican	Donald Ray McFolin	22,968	3.53
Republican	Basil Marceaux, Sr.	13,117	2.01
Total votes		651,247	100

== State legislature ==
=== State Senate ===
Results by senate districts

Winners:

Republican hold
Democratic hold
Republican gain
No election

Elections for 18 of the 33 seats in Tennessee's State Senate were held on November 4, 2014.

After this election, Republicans had 28 seats while Democrats had 5 seats, with Republicans gaining two seats.

=== State House of Representatives ===
Results by State House districts

Winners:

Republican hold
Democratic hold
Republican gain
Democratic gain

The election of all 99 seats in the Tennessee House of Representatives occurred on November 4, 2014.

Republicans won 73 seats, while Democrats won 26 seats. Republicans gained two seats during this election.

== Ballot measures ==
=== Amendment 1 ===
Amendment 1
- Shall Article I, of the Constitution of Tennessee be amended by adding the following language as a new, appropriately designated section: Nothing in this Constitution secures or protects a right to abortion or requires the funding of an abortion. The people retain the right through their elected state representatives and state senators to enact, amend, or repeal statutes regarding abortion, including, but not limited to, circumstances of pregnancy resulting from rape or incest or when necessary to save the life of the mother.

Results
Choice	Votes	%
Yes	729,163	52.60%
No	657,192	47.40%
Valid votes	1,386,355	100.00%
Invalid or blank votes	0	0.00%
Total votes	1,386,355	100.00%
- Results by county Yes 70–80% 60–70% 50–60% No 60–70% 50–60%

This is an approved legislatively referred constitutional amendment to the Constitution of Tennessee that appeared on the ballot on November 4, 2014. The amendment would ensure that Constitution of Tennessee, would not support, fund, or protect the right to an abortion.

=== Amendment 2 ===
Amendment 2
- Shall Article Vl, Section 3 of the Constitution of Tennessee be amended by deleting the first and second sentences and by substituting instead the following: Judges of the Supreme Court or any intermediate appellate court shall be appointed for a full term or to fill a vacancy by and at the discretion of the governor; shall be confirmed by the Legislature; and thereafter, shall be elected in a retention election by the qualified voters of the state. Confirmation by default occurs if the Legislature fails to reject an appointee within sixty calendar days of either the date of appointment, if made during the annual legislative session, or the convening date of the next annual legislative session, if made out of session. The Legislature is authorized to prescribe such provisions as may be necessary to carry out Sections two and three of this article.

Results
Choice	Votes	%
Yes	832,188	60.91%
No	533,973	39.09%
Valid votes	1,366,161	100.00%
Invalid or blank votes	0	0.00%
Total votes	1,366,161	100.00%
- Results by county Yes 70–80% 60–70% 50–60% No 50–60%

=== Amendment 3 ===
This amendment would prohibit a state income tax. It passed with 66.21% of the vote.

Amendment 3
- Shall Article ll, Section 28 of the Constitution of Tennessee be amended by adding the following sentence at the end of the final substantive paragraph within the section: Notwithstanding the authority to tax privileges or any other authority set forth in this Constitution, the Legislature shall not levy, authorize or otherwise permit any state or local tax upon payroll or earned personal income or any state state or local tax measured by payroller earned personal income; however, nothing contained herein shall be construed as prohibiting any tax in effect on January 1, 2011, or adjustment of the rate of such tax.

Results
Choice	Votes	%
Yes	882,926	66.21%
No	450,522	33.79%
Valid votes	1,333,448	100.00%
Invalid or blank votes	0	0.00%
Total votes	1,333,448	100.00%
- Results by county Yes 70–80% 60–70% 50–60%

=== Amendment 4 ===
Amendment 4
- Shall Article XI, Section 5 of the Constitution of Tennessee be amended by deleting the following language: All other forms of lottery not authorized herein are expressly prohibited unless authorized by a two-thirds vote of all members elected to each house of the general assembly for an annual event operated for the benefit of a 501(c)(3) organization located in this state, as defined by the 2000 United States Tax Code or as may be amended from time to time. and by substituting instead the following language: All other forms of lottery not authorized herein are expressly prohibited unless authorized by a two-thirds vote of all members elected to each house of the general assembly for an annual event operated for the benefit of a 501(c)(3) or a 501(c)(19) organization, as defined by the 2000 United States Tax Code, located in this state.

Results
Choice	Votes	%
Yes	903,353	69.59%
No	394,727	30.41%
Valid votes	1,298,080	100.00%
Invalid or blank votes	0	0.00%
Total votes	1,298,080	100.00%
- Results by county Yes 70–80% 60–70% 50–60%

== Supreme Court ==
=== Retention elections (August 7, 2014) ===
All incumbent Tennessee Supreme Court Justices won their retention elections, getting eight more years. While the justices were able to overcome a vigorous opposition campaign by Ron Ramsey and other Republicans, who accused them of being "liberal," "soft on crime" and of helping Obamacare, their retention victories were by some of the smallest margins in recent history.

All retained justices were appointed by former Democratic governor Phil Bredesen.

Tennessee Supreme Court Chief Justice, Gary R. Wade retention election
Choice	Votes	%
For	499,218	57.30
Against	371,993	42.70
Total	871,211	100.00

Tennessee Supreme Court Associate Justice, Sharon G. Lee retention election
Choice	Votes	%
For	495,855	56.83
Against	376,696	43.17
Total	872,551	100.00

Tennessee Supreme Court Associate Justice, Cornelia A. Clark retention election
- Shall Cornelia A. (Connie) Clark be retained or replaced in office as Judge of the Supreme Court, at Large?

Results
Choice	Votes	%
Yes	492,972	56.04%
No	386,743	43.96%
Valid votes	879,715	100.00%
Invalid or blank votes	0	0.00%
Total votes	879,715	100.00%
- Results by county Retain 70–80% 60–70% 50–60% Replace 60–70% 50–60%

== Local elections ==
=== Knox County ===
Incumbent Republican mayor Tim Burchett ran for re-election and was opposed by no one in both the primary and the general election since no other candidate filed to run against him.

=== Results ===
August 7, 2014 General election results
Party	Candidate	Votes	%
Republican	Tim Burchett (incumbent)	48,062	100.00%
Total votes		48,062	100.00%

May 6, 2014, primary results

Republican primary results
Party	Candidate	Votes	%
Republican	Tim Burchett (incumbent)	20,539	100.00%
Total votes		20,539	100.00%

=== Shelby County ===
Final results by precinct: Luttrell: 50–60%; 60–70%; 70–80%; 80–90%; >90%; Malone: 40–50% 50–60%; 60–70%; 70–80%; 80–90%

Incumbent Republican Mayor Mark Luttrell won re-election with 62.3% of the vote, defeating Democratic nominee Deidre Malone.

=== Results ===
August 7, 2014 General election results
Party	Candidate	Votes	%
Republican	Mark Luttrell	90,541	62.34%
Democratic	Deidre Malone	52,438	36.11%
Independent	Charles Nelson	1,635	1.13%
Independent	Leo Awgowhat	552	0.38%
Write-in	Write-in	62	0.04%
Total votes		145,228	100.00%

May 6, 2014, primary results

Democratic primary results
Party	Candidate	Votes	%
Democratic	Deidre Malone	13,792	35.77%
Democratic	Kenneth Whalum Jr.	12,607	32.70%
Democratic	Steven J. Mulroy	12,046	31.24%
Total votes		38,559	100.00%

Democratic primary results
Party	Candidate	Votes	%
Republican	Mark Luttrell (Incumbent)	16,824	96.45%
Republican	Ernest Lunati	595	3.41%
Write-in	Write-in	25	0.14%
Total votes		17,444	100.00%

=== Clarksville ===
Incumbent Democratic mayor Kim McMillan ran for re-election and won a second term in office in a 3-way race.

November 4, 2014 Clarksville Mayor Election
Candidate	Votes	%
Kim McMillan (I)	9,577	46.88%
Bill Summers	5,544	27.14%
Jeff Burkhart	5,267	25.78%
Write-ins	42	0.21%
Total	20,430	100%

=== Murfreesboro ===
Incumbent Democratic mayor Tommy Bragg decided not to run for re-election to a third term.

Republican candidate Shane McFarland defeated Vice Mayor Ron Washington, becoming the youngest person elected as mayor in Murfreesboro history.

August 15, 2014 Murfreesboro Mayor Election
Candidate	Votes	%
Shane McFarland	5,315	68.09%
Ron Washington	2,474	31.69%
Write-ins	17	0.22%
Total	7,806	100%

== See also ==
- Elections in Tennessee
- Political party strength in Tennessee
- Tennessee Democratic Party
- Tennessee Republican Party
- Government of Tennessee
- Tennessee Supreme Court
- 2014 United States elections
