= Tennessee Chancery and Probate Courts =

Courts of equity in Tennessee, US

Tennessee has 32 judicial districts with a Chancery Court in each district. Some of these 32 districts have legislatively created Probate Courts. If a particular county did not create a special Probate court, the jurisdiction over the probate stays with the Chancery court.

== Tennessee chancery courts ==
Tennessee's Chancery Courts are courts of equity. Tennessee's Chancery Court was created in the first half of the 19th Century, and remains one of the few distinctly separate courts of equity in the United States. While the Chancery Court and Tennessee's Circuit Court, the court of general civil and criminal jurisdiction, may share a set of procedural rules in each county, there are some distinct rules applying to the separate courts. Parties in the Chancery Court are entitled to have a jury try issues of material fact.

In 2015, Tennessee's Supreme Court created a pilot business court. The Davidson County (Nashville) Chancery Court Part III was designated to serve as the Business Court. Chancellor Ellen Hobbs Lyle was the first Business Court judge and sat on the Business Court into 2019. In 2017, Davidson County Circuit Court Judge Joe Binkley was appointed a Business Court judge. In 2019, Davidson County Chancellor Anne C. Martin was appointed the Business Court judge and remains in that position (as of May 2026). She was appointed as a Business Court Representative to the American Bar Association's Business Law Section in 2023. Tennessee's Administrative Office of the Courts received a grant from the State Justice Institute to work with the National Center for State Courts to develop a curriculum for expanding business courts in Tennessee and elsewhere.

== Tennessee probate courts ==
The Probate Courts are legislatively created courts with jurisdiction over probating wills, estate administration, conservatorships and guardianships. Only two counties, Shelby and Davidson, have Probate Courts. There are only three probate judges in the state. Unless properly designated to another court, probate and estate matters will reside in a Tennessee county’s Chancery Court.

== See also ==
- Courts of Tennessee
