= Mary L. Wagner =

American judge (born 1984)

Mary Wagner

Justice of the Tennessee Supreme Court
- Incumbent
- Assumed office September 1, 2024
- Appointed by: Bill Lee
- Preceded by: Roger A. Page

Personal details
- Born: 1984 (age 41–42)
- Party: Republican
- Spouse: Tom Owen
- Education: University of Colorado, Boulder (BA); University of Memphis (JD)

Mary Louise Wagner (born 1984) is an American lawyer who has served as a justice of the Tennessee Supreme Court since 2024.

== Education ==
Wagner received a Bachelor of Arts in political science from the University of Colorado Boulder in 2006. She received a Juris Doctor from the Cecil C. Humphreys School of Law of the University of Memphis, graduating magna cum laude, in 2009.

== Legal career ==
From 2009 to 2010, she served as a law clerk to Judge Steven Stafford of the Tennessee Court of Appeals. From 2010 to 2011, she was an associate with Leitner, Williams, Dooley and Napolitan PLLC. From 2012 to 2014, she was an adjunct professor at the University of Memphis School of Law. From 2011 to 2016, she was an associate with Rice, Amundsen & Aperton PLLC.

== Judicial career ==
=== State court service ===
Wagner was one of three candidates suggested to Governor Bill Haslam to fill a vacant seat on the Shelby County Circuit Court bench. The vacancy occurred due to the retirement of Judge Donna Fields.

On October 24, 2016, Governor Haslam announced the appointment of Wagner to serve as a circuit court judge for the 30th Judicial District, which serves Shelby County. She was elected on August 2, 2018 and re-elected on August 4, 2022.

=== Tennessee Supreme Court ===
In December 2023, Wagner was one of six candidates who applied for an upcoming vacancy. In January 2024, Wagner was named as one of three finalists for an upcoming vacancy.

On February 1, 2024, Governor Bill Lee nominated Wagner to a seat on the Tennessee Supreme Court. She would fill the vacancy left by Justice Roger A. Page, who retired on August 31, 2024.

On March 11, 2024, she was confirmed to the court. The Tennessee House of Representatives voted 94–3 and the Tennessee Senate voted 32–0. She was sworn into office on August 21, 2024 by Chief Justice Holly Kirby. She assumed office on September 1, 2024.

== Memberships ==
Wagner is a member of the Federalist Society.

== Personal life ==
Wagner is married to Tom Owen.

== Notes ==
Legal offices
| Preceded by Roger A. Page | Justice of the Tennessee Supreme Court; 2024–present | Incumbent |
