= Cornelia Clark =

American judge (1950–2021)

Chief Justice of the Tennessee Supreme Court
- In office September 1, 2010 – September 1, 2012
- Preceded by: Janice M. Holder
- Succeeded by: Gary R. Wade

Associate Justice of the Tennessee Supreme Court
- In office September 2005 – September 24, 2021
- Appointed by: Phil Bredesen
- Succeeded by: Sarah K. Campbell

Personal details
- Born: September 15, 1950 Franklin, Tennessee, U.S.
- Died: September 24, 2021 (aged 71)
- Education: Vanderbilt University (BA, JD); Harvard University (MAT)

Cornelia Anne Clark (September 15, 1950 – September 24, 2021) was an American attorney and jurist who served as a justice of the Tennessee Supreme Court from 2005 until her death in 2021.

== Early life and education ==
Clark was born in Franklin, Tennessee, the daughter of William Howard Clark Sr., and Cornelia Anne Ewin Clark. Her family moved to Atlanta when she was 12 years old. After high school in Atlanta, she attended Vanderbilt University in Nashville, where she received the Bachelor of Arts degree, in 1971, with a major in sociology. She subsequently earned the Master of Arts in Teaching at Harvard University, in 1972, and worked as a teacher in Atlanta for several years. In 1976, she returned to Nashville to study at the Vanderbilt University Law School, where she was awarded her Juris Doctor in 1979.

== Career ==
After law school, she engaged in the private practice of law with the former firm of Farris, Warfield & Kanaday, where she was the first woman to be a partner, and worked as city attorney in her home town of Franklin. In 1989, Governor Ned McWherter appointed her circuit judge for the 21st Judicial District of Tennessee, covering Williamson, Hickman, Perry, and Lewis counties. She held this position from 1989 to 1999 and was the first woman to serve as a trial judge in rural Tennessee counties. While engaged in the practice of law, she also taught the subject as an adjunct professor at the Vanderbilt Law School.

In May 1999 the Tennessee Supreme Court appointed Clark to the position of director of the Tennessee Administrative Office of the Courts. In 2005, while working in this position, she became one of three nominees chosen by the judicial selection commission created under the Tennessee Plan for potential appointment to a vacancy on the Tennessee Supreme Court, and was selected for the office by Governor Phil Bredesen. Her Supreme Court service began in September 2005. In June 2006, the judicial retention commission recommended her for a full eight-year term on the Supreme Court. Her retention in office was approved by Tennessee voters in August 2006.

Clark served as chief justice from September 1, 2010, until September 1, 2012.

=== Professional affiliations and activities ===
Clark was a member of the Tennessee Lawyers' Association for Women and served as Second Vice President of the Nashville Bar Association. She was a Fellow of the Nashville, Tennessee, and American Bar Foundations, and member of the Williamson County Bar Association. She served as chair of the board of directors of the Nashville YWCA and was on the Board of the League of Women Voters of Williamson County. She was a member of American Judicature Society and served as a faculty member of the American Academy of Judicial Education. She served as chair of the Tennessee Judicial Council and inaugural chair of the Judicial Evaluation Commission. She previously served as a member of the board of directors of the Conference of State Court Administrators. She was an Access to Justice Commission Liaison for the Supreme Court. In 2004, she was named as one of 21 members to the American Bar Association (ABA) Commission on the American Jury.

=== Teaching ===
Clark taught fellow judges at the National Judicial College, American Academy of Judicial Education, and the American Institute for Justice. She was an adjunct professor at the Vanderbilt University School of Law, for 10 years, and served on the faculty of the Nashville School of Law. Clark was also vice president of the Tennessee Judicial Conference and dean of the Tennessee Judicial Academy, when she was a trial judge. She was also a member of the Supreme Court Commissions on the Rules of Civil Procedure and Technology.

=== Community involvement ===
Clark was a past board member of the Heritage Foundation of Franklin and Williamson County. She was co-chair and served on the Board of Directors of Franklin Tomorrow, Inc. She was chair of the City of Franklin Land Use Plan Steering Committee and citizen chair of the City of Franklin Charter Revision Committee. Clark was a former member of the Williamson County-Franklin Chamber of Commerce Board of Directors. She served as the first regional Allocations Panel chair of the United Way Worldwide while serving as a member of the Williamson County United Way board of directors.

== Awards ==
Clark was a recipient of the Janice M. Holder Access to Justice Award, from the Tennessee Alliance for Legal Services; the Tennessee Bar Association's Justice Frank F. Drowota III Outstanding Judicial Service Award; the Vanderbilt University School of Law Distinguished Service Award; the Grayfred Gray Award, from the Tennessee Association of Professional Mediators; the Judge Martha Craig Daughtrey Award, from the Lawyers’ Association for Women - Marion Griffin Chapter; the Liberty Bell Award, given by the Williamson County Bar Association; and the Pioneer Award, from Vision 2020. The Southeastern Chapter of the American Board of Trial Advocates named Clark Appellate Judge of the Year. She was inducted into the Nashville YWCA Academy for Women of Achievement.

== See also ==
- List of female state supreme court justices
