= Kyle Hixson =

American judge (born 1983/84)

Justice of the Tennessee Supreme Court
- Incumbent
- Assumed office July 1, 2026
- Appointed by: Bill Lee
- Preceded by: Holly M. Kirby

Personal details
- Born: 1983 or 1984 (age 42–43)
- Education: University of Tennessee (BA, JD)

Kyle A. Hixson (born 1983/1984) is an American judge. He has served as a justice of the Tennessee Supreme Court since 2026. He previously served as a judge of the Tennessee Court of Criminal Appeals from 2022 to 2026.

== Life and career ==
Hixson attended the University of Tennessee, earning his bachelor's degree in 2005. He also attended the University of Tennessee Law School, earning his Juris Doctor degree in 2008. After earning his degrees, he worked as a criminal prosecutor in Knox County, Tennessee, and was an adjunct professor at the University of Tennessee Law School.

Hixson served as judge of the Tennessee Court of Criminal Appeals from 2022 to 2026. After his service as judge, he has served as a justice of the Tennessee Supreme Court since 2026.

Legal offices
Preceded by Holly M. Kirby	Justice of the Tennessee Supreme Court; 2026–present	Incumbent
