= William C. Koch Jr. =

American judge

- Born: September 12, 1947 (age 78)
- Education: Trinity College
- Occupation: Dean Nashville School of Law
- Known for: Tennessee Supreme Court

William C. Koch Jr. (born September 12, 1947) is a former justice of the Tennessee Supreme Court. Prior to his appointment to the court in 2007, he served 23 years on the Tennessee Court of Appeals. He retired from the court on July 15, 2014, and accepted the position of dean at Nashville School of Law.

== Career ==
Koch studied at Trinity College in Connecticut. He obtained his law degree at Vanderbilt University and his LL.M from the University of Virginia School of Law. He was appointed to the Tennessee Supreme Court in 2007. He teaches at the Nashville School of Law.

== Awards ==
- Tennessee Appellate Judge of the Year (2002)
- 500 Leading Judges in America (2006)
