= Jeffrey S. Bivins =

American judge (born 1960)

Jeff Bivins

Chief Justice of the Tennessee Supreme Court
- Incumbent
- Assumed office September 1, 2025
- Preceded by: Holly M. Kirby
- In office September 1, 2016 – August 31, 2021
- Preceded by: Sharon G. Lee
- Succeeded by: Roger A. Page

Justice of the Tennessee Supreme Court
- Incumbent
- Assumed office July 16, 2014
- Appointed by: Bill Haslam
- Preceded by: William C. Koch Jr.

Personal details
- Born: Jeffrey Scott Bivins; August 31, 1960 (age 65) Kingsport, Tennessee, U.S.
- Party: Republican
- Education: East Tennessee State University (BA); Vanderbilt University (JD)

Jeffrey Scot Bivins (born August 31, 1960) is a justice of the Tennessee Supreme Court. He was appointed as a justice of the court by Governor Bill Haslam. Since 2025, he has served as Chief Justice.

== Education ==
Bivins received a Bachelor of Arts degree, magna cum laude, in 1982 from East Tennessee State University, with a major in political science and a minor in criminal justice. He graduated with a Juris Doctor from Vanderbilt University Law School in 1986.

== Career ==
From 1986 to 1995, Bivins served in private practice at the law firm of Boult, Cummings, Conners & Berry. He later served as Assistant Commissioner and General Counsel at the Tennessee Department of Personnel from 1996 to 1999 and again from 2000 to 2001. He returned to private practice in 2001 and served in that capacity until his appointment to the bench in 2005.

=== Judicial service ===
Bivins served as a judge on the Tennessee Court of Criminal Appeals from August 2011 until July 2014, after being appointed by Gov. Bill Haslam. Previously, Bivins was appointed to Circuit Court, 21st Judicial District in 2005 by Gov. Phil Bredesen and elected to an 8-year term in 2006. He also previously served in a trial judge position from July 1999 through August 2000.

Bivins was sworn in as a member of the Tennessee Supreme Court in July 2014. He was elected as chief justice in 2016 and served until 2021.

== Community memberships ==
Bivins serves on the Board of Judicial Conduct. He also serves on the Executive Committee of the Tennessee Judicial Conference and is the President-Elect of the Conference. He also has served on the Tennessee Judicial Evaluation Commission. He is a member of the John Marshall American Inns of Court, having served as President from 2003 to 2008, and is a member of the Tennessee Bar Association and the Williamson County Bar Association. He also is a Fellow of the Tennessee Bar Foundation and the Nashville Bar Foundation. He is former member of the Williamson County Commission.

Legal offices
Preceded by William C. Koch Jr.	Justice of the Tennessee Supreme Court; 2014–present	Incumbent
Preceded by Sharon G. Lee	Chief Justice of the Tennessee Supreme Court; 2016–2021	Succeeded by Roger A. Page
Preceded by Holly M. Kirby	Chief Justice of the Tennessee Supreme Court; 2025–present	Incumbent
