= Sarah K. Campbell =

American judge (born 1982)

Sarah Campbell

Justice of the Tennessee Supreme Court
- Incumbent
- Assumed office February 10, 2022
- Appointed by: Bill Lee
- Preceded by: Cornelia Clark

Personal details
- Born: Sarah Keeton Campbell; 1982 (age 43–44) LaFollette, Tennessee, U.S.
- Party: Republican
- Education: University of Tennessee (BA); Duke University (JD, MPP)

Sarah Keeton Campbell (born 1982) is an American lawyer who has served as an associate justice of the Tennessee Supreme Court since 2022.

== Background and career ==
Campbell was raised in Rogersville, Tennessee, where her family moved when she was eleven years old. She earned her high school diploma from Cherokee High School in 2000. In 2004, after winning election as President of the Student Government, Campbell earned a Bachelor of Arts, summa cum laude, from the University of Tennessee. She graduated from Duke University School of Law in 2009, magna cum laude, and earned a Master of Public Policy from the Sanford School of Public Policy the same year.

Following law school, Campbell served as a law clerk to Judge William H. Pryor Jr. of the United States Court of Appeals for the Eleventh Circuit and Associate Justice Samuel Alito of the Supreme Court of the United States.

Campbell then worked as an associate at Williams & Connolly until 2015.

Campbell joined the Tennessee Attorney General's office in 2015, where she served as associate solicitor general and special assistant to the attorney general.

=== Judicial service ===
Tennessee Governor Bill Lee nominated Campbell to the Tennessee Supreme Court on January 12, 2022. She was confirmed by the General Assembly and sworn in on February 10, 2022.

== See also ==
- List of law clerks for the eighth seat of the Supreme Court of the United States

Legal offices
Preceded by Cornelia Clark	Justice of the Tennessee Supreme Court; 2022–present	Incumbent
