= Roger A. Page =

American judge (born 1955)

Roger Page

Chief Justice of the Tennessee Supreme Court
- In office September 1, 2021 – August 31, 2023
- Preceded by: Jeffrey S. Bivins
- Succeeded by: Holly M. Kirby

Justice of the Tennessee Supreme Court
- In office February 22, 2016 – August 31, 2024
- Appointed by: Bill Haslam
- Preceded by: Gary R. Wade
- Succeeded by: Mary L. Wagner

Personal details
- Born: October 7, 1955 (age 69); Mifflin, Tennessee, U.S.
- Political party: Republican
- Education: University of Tennessee, Martin; University of Tennessee, Memphis (BS); University of Memphis (JD)

Roger A. Page (born October 7, 1955) is an American lawyer who served as a justice of the Tennessee Supreme Court from 2016 to 2024. He was appointed to the court by Governor Bill Haslam.

== Education ==
Page received his Juris Doctor in 1984 from the University of Memphis School of Law, where he ranked 4th in his class. He received a bachelor's degree in 1978 from the University of Tennessee College of Pharmacy in Memphis. He attended the University of Tennessee at Martin from 1973 to 1975 after graduating from Chester County High School in Henderson, Tennessee.

== Career ==
Page is a former licensed pharmacist. He filled his last prescription the day before he took the Tennessee Bar examination in 1984, and kept his pharmacist's license active until 1998 when he was elected circuit court judge. After obtaining his law license, Page was a law clerk from 1984 to 1985 for Judge Julia Smith Gibbons of the United States District Court for the Western District of Tennessee. In 1985 he was hired in the private sector as an associate attorney with Peterson, Young, Self and Asselin. In 1987, he was hired as an associate and partner with Holmes, Rich, Sigler and Page, a Jackson, Tennessee law firm. While in the private sector, his practice was general in nature, including personal injury, criminal, and workers' compensation cases. In 1991, he was hired by the State of Tennessee Attorney General's Office where he served seven years as an Assistant Attorney General where he handled mostly civil matters.

== Judicial service ==
=== Tennessee Court of Criminal Appeals ===
Prior to assuming a seat on the Supreme Court, Page served as an appellate judge on the Tennessee Court of Criminal Appeals from December 2011 to February 2016 where he wrote more than 330 appellate opinions. In 1998, he was elected to the position of circuit court judge where he presided over both civil and criminal trials in the 26th Judicial District, which includes Chester, Henderson and Madison counties. He served in that position from August 1998 to December 2011.

=== Tennessee Supreme Court ===
Page was sworn in as a member of the Tennessee Supreme Court in February 2016. He was appointed to this position by Governor Bill Haslam. He was the first justice to be confirmed by the state legislature under the state's appellate court selection process ratified by state voters in 2014. This amendment to the Constitution of Tennessee requires an appointment by the governor and confirmation by the General Assembly. The legislature met on February 22, 2016, in a joint session where the Senate voted 30–0 and the House voted 97–0 to confirm the appointment. The confirmation also created a Republican majority for the first time in modern history on the five-member court. On August 24, 2021, Page was elected to be the next Chief Justice of the Tennessee Supreme Court, succeeding Jeffrey S. Bivins for a term commencing September 1, 2021. He served until 2023. Page retired from the court on August 31, 2024.

== Personal ==
Page is married to Tennessee Trial Court Judge Carol McCoy. They have two sons and three grandchildren. Page is a member of the Jackson Lions Club, Edmund Howell Jackson American Inns of Court, the Tennessee Bar Association and the Jackson/Madison County Bar Association. He and his family attend First Baptist Church in Jackson, Tennessee. Page has also been a Dixie Youth baseball coach, and was part of a Jackson (TN) city champions team for Senior Olympics Softball (age 50–55 division).

Legal offices
Preceded by Gary R. Wade	Justice of the Tennessee Supreme Court; 2016–2024	Succeeded by Mary L. Wagner
Preceded by Jeffrey S. Bivins	Chief Justice of the Tennessee Supreme Court; 2021–2023	Succeeded by Holly M. Kirby
