= Courts of Tennessee =

Courts of Tennessee include:

State courts of Tennessee

- Tennessee Supreme Court
  - Tennessee Court of Appeals (3 grand divisions)
  - Tennessee Court of Criminal Appeals (3 grand divisions)
    - Tennessee Circuit Courts (32 judicial districts)
    - Tennessee Chancery and Probate Courts (32 judicial districts)
    - Tennessee Criminal Courts (32 judicial districts)
    - Tennessee Municipal and City Courts
    - Tennessee Juvenile and Family Courts
    - Tennessee General Session Courts

Federal courts located in Tennessee

- United States District Court for the Eastern District of Tennessee
- United States District Court for the Middle District of Tennessee
- United States District Court for the Western District of Tennessee

Former federal courts of Tennessee

- United States District Court for the District of Tennessee (subdivided, as three districts, in 1862)
