= Steven J. Mulroy =

American district attorney (born 1964)

Steve Mulroy
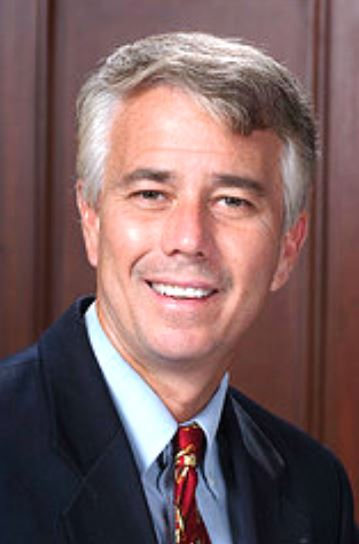

District Attorney of Shelby County, Tennessee
- Incumbent
- Assumed office September 1, 2022
- Preceded by: Amy Weirich

Personal details
- Born: April 9, 1964 (age 62) New York City, New York, U.S.
- Party: Democratic
- Spouse: Amy Birkimer (m. 1991)
- Education: Cornell University (BA); College of William and Mary (JD)

Steven J. Mulroy (born April 9, 1964) is the District Attorney of Shelby County, Tennessee. Previously, he was a University of Memphis law professor who served on the County Commission for Shelby County, Tennessee from District 5 from 2006 to 2014. Born and raised in Brooklyn, New York, he spent his high school years living in Gulf Breeze, Florida and studied at Cornell University, followed by William & Mary Law School. A member of the Democratic Party, his 2006 election to the Memphis-area County Commission seat shifted the balance of power from Republican to Democratic for the first time in the county's history. He is also the first Shelby County DA elected as a Democrat.

== Early life and education ==
Mulroy was born and raised in Brooklyn, New York. He is the son of a telephone company employee who died in 1998 and a widowed housewife who died in 2025 in Gulf Breeze, Florida. He attended a Roman Catholic parochial elementary school, Mary, Queen of Heaven, in Brooklyn, and then Gulf Breeze High School following his 1978 childhood move from Brooklyn to Florida. He attended Cornell University on a merit scholarship, spent one semester studying in Washington, D.C. through the Cornell-in-Washington program, and graduated in 1986. Mulroy graduated from William & Mary Law School in 1989 with the "Order of the Coif" honor.

== Career ==
Mulroy began his legal career in 1989 as a judicial clerk for the Hon. Roger Vinson, a federal district court judge in Pensacola, Florida. In 1991, through the U.S. Justice Department's Honors Program, he joined the Department's Civil Rights Division as a trial attorney. He spent 1991-95 in the Voting Section and 1995 through 1999 in the Housing and Civil Enforcement Section. From 1999-2000, he served as a Special Assistant United States Attorney (a federal prosecutor) in the U.S. Attorney's Office in Alexandria, Virginia. In 2000, he began teaching at the University of Memphis, School of Law, attaining tenure in 2006.

In 2006, he was promoted to Associate Professor, and in 2010, from full Professor of Law. He taught and published in the fields of election law, criminal law and procedure, and constitutional law and served for two years as Associate Dean.

In 2006, Mulroy successfully ran for the Shelby County, Tennessee Commission, representing the 5th District. He served two four-year terms, leaving the Commission due to term limits in late 2014. He ran for County Mayor in 2014, losing the Democratic primary.

While on the County Commission, Mulroy drafted Shelby County's first ethics ordinance, animal welfare ordinance, and "cash for tires" ordinance, and the first ever legislation at any level in Tennessee which provided discrimination protection for the LGBT community." He successfully pushed for substantial increases in county funding for homelessness and pre-K education.

During the body's 2011 redistricting, he led the successful effort to switch from 3-Commissioner multimember districts to single-member districts, arguing, among other things, that the latter led to more competitive elections.

In 2013, Mulroy was one of three names sent to the White House for consideration to fill a federal district court judge vacancy in the Western District of Tennessee in Memphis. He did not ultimately receive the appointment.

In 2022, Mulroy prevailed against two candidates in a competitive Democratic primary for District Attorney. He went on to defeat incumbent District Attorney, Republican Amy Weirich, 56.12% (74,752 votes) to 43.79% (58,328 votes).

Mulroy is the author of Rethinking US election law: Unskewing the System, which "offers comprehensive considerations of arguments in favor of and against proposed reforms of US election law." As an expert in comparative election law, he contributed to the Routledge Handbook of Election Law.

On January 24, 2023, as District Attorney, Mulroy charged five Memphis police officers, who were members of the now disbanded scorpion unit, in the killing of Tyre Nichols. The five officers were charged with second degree murder, aggravated assault, aggravated kidnapping, aggravated kidnapping with a deadly weapon, official misconduct, harming another, official misconduct, refraining from performing a duty imposed by law, official oppression. On January 26, 2023, a Shelby County grand jury returned an indictment against the five officers.

== Other ==
Mulroy led several historic preservation efforts before, during, and after his County Commission tenure. From 2005 through 2010, he led a grass-roots effort to save the historic "Zippin Pippin" rollercoaster and the Grand Carousel, two anchor rides at Memphis' Libertyland Amusement Park which were mothballed when the amusement park closed in 2005. In 2006, the grass-roots group succeeded in preventing the Grand Carousel from being sold at auction, and it was instead held in storage.

In 2010, with the coaster facing demolition, Mulroy arranged for it to be sold and Zippin Pippin moved to Green Bay, Wisconsin, where it continues to operate at Bay Beach Amusement Park. The Grand Carousel was restored and is a feature at the Children's Museum of Memphis. The efforts to save the amusement park and rides were depicted in the documentary film "Destroy Memphis." https://www.imdb.com/title/tt6490138/

In 2013, Mulroy served as one of two pro bono plaintiff attorneys in an effort to prevent the demolition of the historic 19th Century Club Building, also known as the Roland Darnell House. A lawsuit prevented the demolition of the building for about a year, while the preservationist plaintiffs appealed their loss in trial court. In 2014 the preservationists withdrew their appeal, but the building owners later decided to preserve the building and convert it to a high-end restaurant and meeting space.

In 2013, Mulroy made an "altruistic" kidney donation to a stranger. https://www.actionnews5.com/story/22147018/commissioners-kidney-donation-partially-inspired-by-the-simpsons/ The donation allowed doctors at Methodist University Hospital in Memphis, Tennessee to arrange a nationwide "donor chain" of persons who would donate kidneys in exchange for reciprocal donations to designated loved ones. The chain resulted in 28 kidneys being swapped; at the time, it was the second-longest such chain in history, as well as the swiftest exchange of its type and the one involving the greatest number of high-risk cases.

As County Commissioner, he got April 9 recognized as "Shelby County Star Trek Day," the only such official holiday in the U.S. Since 2015, he and his wife have commemorated the holiday by organizing a local Star Trek convention. https://www.commercialappeal.com/story/entertainment/2025/04/11/star-trek-day-2025-in-shelby-county-event/82992063007/
