= Holly M. Kirby =

American judge (born 1957)

Holly Kirby

Chief Justice of the Tennessee Supreme Court
- In office September 1, 2023 – September 1, 2025
- Preceded by: Roger A. Page
- Succeeded by: Jeffrey S. Bivins

Justice of the Tennessee Supreme Court
- In office September 1, 2014 – June 30, 2026
- Appointed by: Bill Haslam
- Preceded by: Janice M. Holder
- Succeeded by: Kyle Hixson

Personal details
- Born: July 9, 1957 (age 68) Memphis, Tennessee, U.S.
- Party: Republican
- Education: University of Memphis (BS, JD)

Holly M. Kirby (born July 9, 1957) is an American lawyer who served on the Tennessee Supreme Court from 2014 to 2026, serving as chief justice from 2023 to 2025. She was appointed to the Supreme Court by Governor Bill Haslam in 2013. She served as a judge of the Tennessee Court of Appeals from 1995 to 2013.

== Education ==
Kirby graduated from Columbia Central High School in Columbia, Tennessee. She attended Memphis State University, where she received a Bachelor of Science in mechanical engineering in 1979. She received a Juris Doctor from the Cecil C. Humphreys School of Law in 1982.

== Career ==
After law school, Kirby served as a judicial law clerk to Judge Harry W. Wellford of the United States Court of Appeals for the Sixth Circuit.

In 1983, Kirby joined the Memphis law firm of Burch, Porter and Johnson, where she specialized in defending businesses in employment-related litigation. In 1990, she became a partner in the firm.

In 1995, she was appointed to the Tennessee Court of Appeals, becoming the first woman on the court.

In December 2013, Governor Bill Haslam appointed Kirby to the Tennessee Supreme Court to fill the upcoming vacancy left by the retirement of Justice Janice M. Holder. She was sworn in as a justice in September 2014. In September 2023, she was elected to serve as chief justice. She retired from the court in June 2026.

== Personal life ==
Kirby is married and has two grown children.

Legal offices
Preceded by Janice M. Holder	Justice of the Tennessee Supreme Court; 2014–2026	Succeeded by Kyle Hixson
Preceded by Roger A. Page	Chief Justice of the Tennessee Supreme Court; 2023–2025	Succeeded by Jeffrey S. Bivins
