= Tennessee Supreme Court =

Highest court in the U.S. state of Tennessee

- Seal of the Tennessee Judiciary

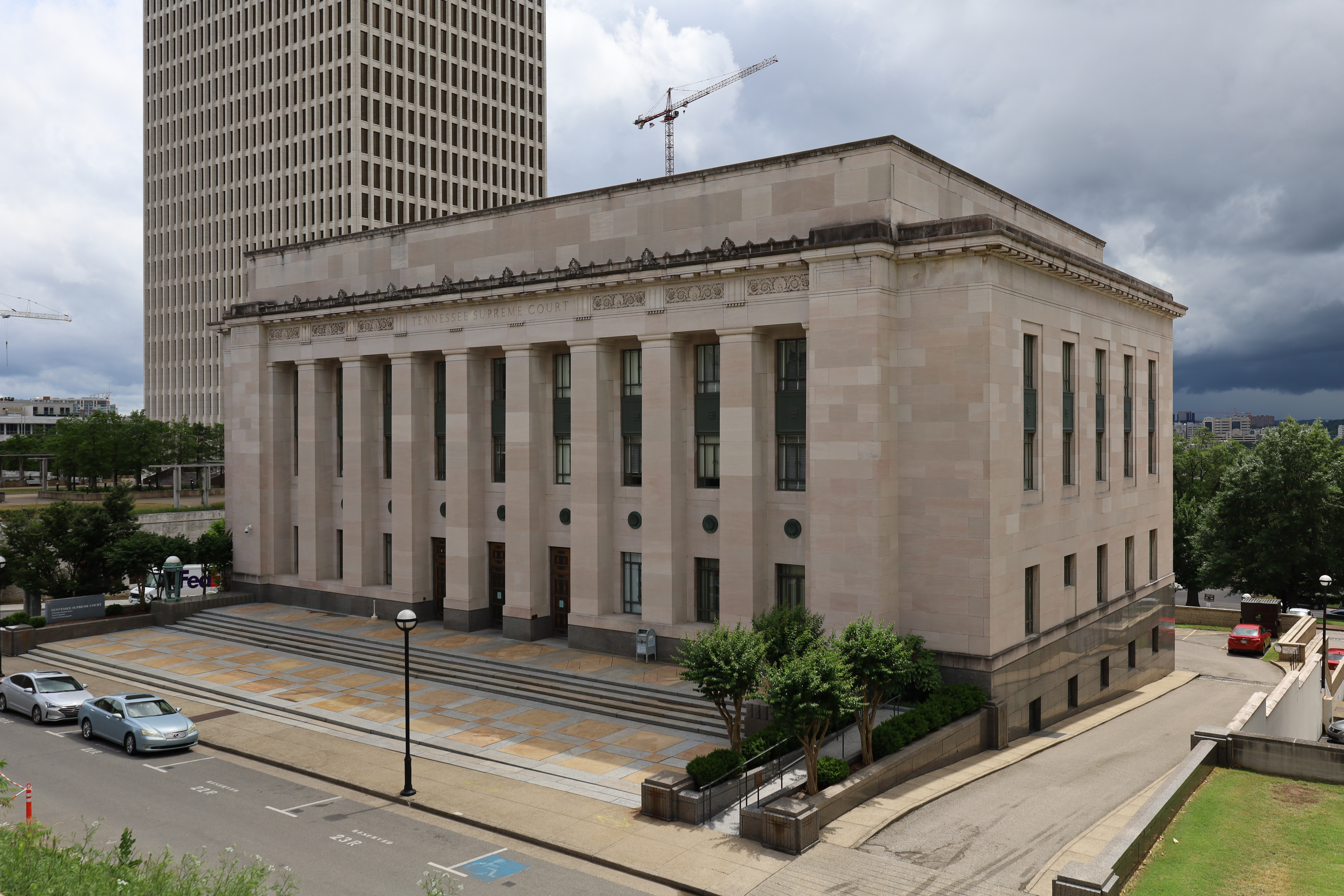
- Tennessee Supreme Court Building in Nashville, 2022
- Established: March 26, 1870
- Jurisdiction: Tennessee, United States
- Location: Knoxville, Nashville, and Jackson
- Composition method: Executive selection plus non-partisan retention (Tennessee Plan)
- Authorized by: Constitution of Tennessee
- Appeals to: Supreme Court of the United States
- Judge term length: 8 years; renewable
- Number of positions: 5
- Website: Official website

Chief Justice
- Currently: Jeffrey S. Bivins
- Since: September 1, 2025

The Tennessee Supreme Court is the highest court in the U.S. state of Tennessee. The Supreme Court's three buildings are seated in Nashville, Knoxville, and Jackson. The court is composed of five members: a chief justice, and four justices. As of September 1, 2025, the chief justice is Jeffrey S. Bivins. The Constitution of Tennessee requires the supreme court to rotate meetings between each of the state's three Grand Divisions, and stipulates that no more than two justices can come from the same Grand Division.

Unlike other states, in which the state attorney general is directly elected or appointed by the governor or state legislature, the Tennessee Supreme Court appoints the Tennessee Attorney General.

== History ==
When Tennessee was admitted as a state on June 1, 1796, it did not have a provision for a judicial branch of government in its constitution. The Tennessee legislature created a Superior Court with three judges who were elected by the general assembly and functioned as both a trial court and an appellate court. In 1809, the Superior Court was abolished by the Tennessee legislature and a new Supreme Court of Error and Appeals, which only heard appellate cases, was established. In 1835, Tennessee adopted a new state constitution that established the judiciary an independent branch of government, which included the Supreme Court as well as a system of lower courts. This court had three justices.

== Structure ==
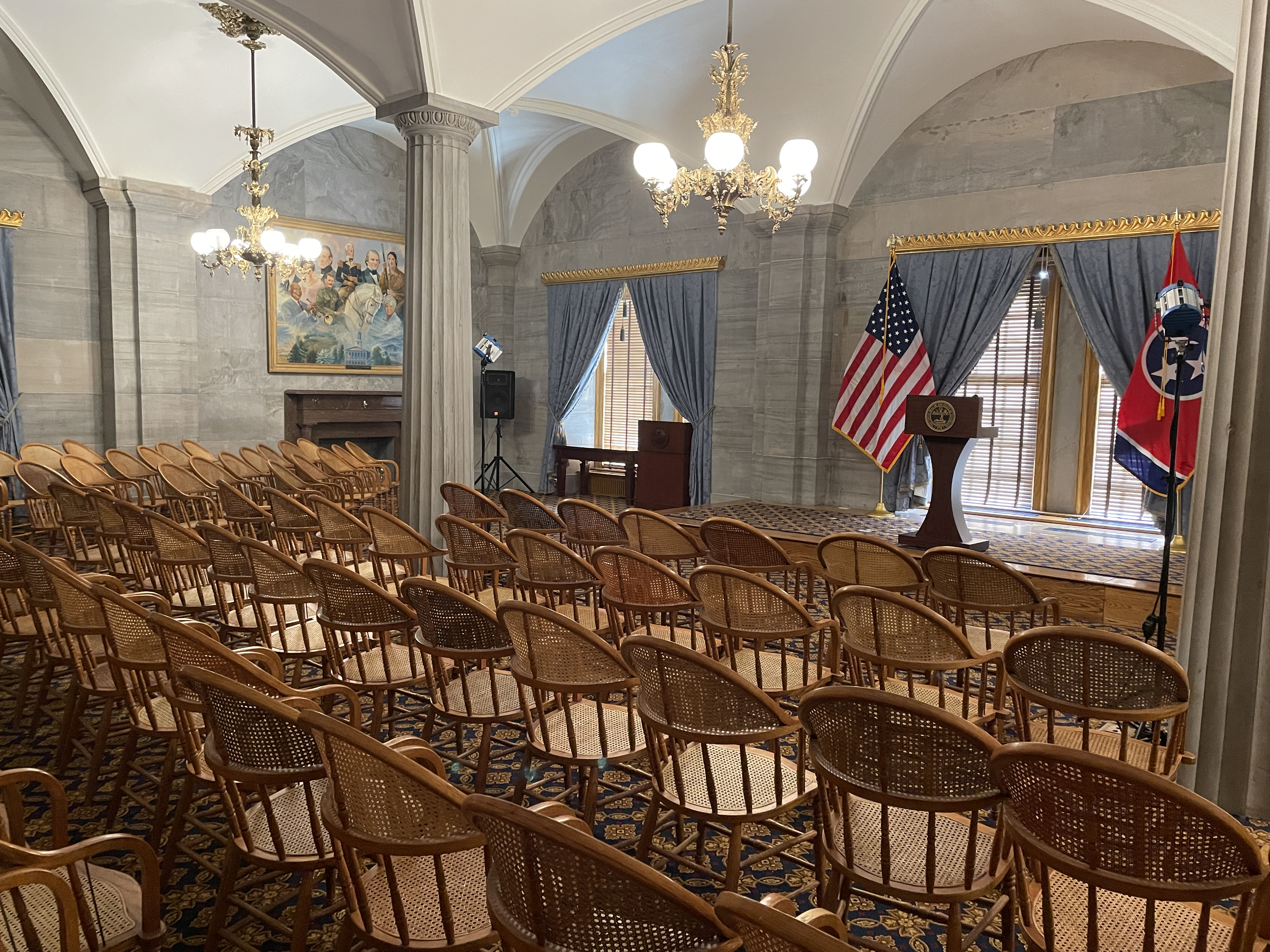
The Tennessee Supreme Court originally met in this chamber in the Tennessee State Capitol

The third Tennessee State Constitution, adopted in 1870, called for five justices, no more than two of whom may come from any one of the state's three Grand Divisions (East Tennessee, Middle Tennessee, and West Tennessee) in order to prevent regional bias. For the same purpose, the court is required to convene alternately in Nashville, Knoxville, and Jackson. In recent years, its provision has been regarded as permissive rather than restrictive. Therefore, the court has met in other cities, such as Chattanooga, Kingsport, and Memphis, throughout the state as part of a legal education project for high school students called Supreme Court Advancing Legal Education for Students (SCALES). SCALES has been instrumental in allowing over 36,000 high school students from over 540 high schools in Tennessee to see the court in action since 1995.

The justices serve eight-year terms and can succeed themselves. The office of chief justice rotates among the justices. Justices are required to recuse themselves in cases in which they may have a personal interest; the whole court once had to step aside and a case be heard by a special court appointed by the governor, this occurring when the court itself became the subject of litigation, as described below.

The Tennessee Supreme Court has no original jurisdiction. Other than in cases of worker's compensation, which have traditionally been appealed directly to it from the trial court, it hears only appeals of civil cases which have been heard by the Court of Appeals, and of criminal cases that have been heard by the Court of Criminal Appeals. The Tennessee Supreme Court was created through the Constitutional Convention of 1834 and replaced the Tennessee Court of Errors and Appeals.

== Judicial selection ==
The method by which Tennessee's supreme court justices are selected has changed significantly over the years.

Originally, each justice was elected by the Tennessee General Assembly for life.

An 1853 amendment to the state constitution set judicial terms of office to eight years (even with changes in the election process, the tenure has remained the same ever since) and provided that all judges (including supreme court justices) would be elected by the people. Under this arrangement, a justice could enter office either through gubernatorial appointment (to fill a vacancy) or by winning a partisan election. Either way, the justice would have to stand for re-election during the next general state election.

In 1971, a statute modified this process at the appellate level. Under a modified version of the Missouri Plan, appellate judges (including supreme court justices) would be subjected only to a "Yes/No" retention vote rather than to any challenge from an electoral opponent. Thus, it became impossible to become an appellate judge without being appointed by the governor.

The revised statute was subject to litigation. In the case of Higgins v. Dunn (1973), the court held that the retention elections were constitutional, as the constitution specified only that judges must be elected, without precisely defining what kinds of elections the General Assembly must enact for that purpose. Justice Allison B. Humphries, in his dissent, opined that the supreme court justices approving the constitutionality of the Modified Missouri Plan had, "like Esau, sold [their] precious birthright, equality and freedom for a mess of potage" and had made the judicial branch subordinate to the legislative branch.

Partially as a result of that decision, the statute was revised in 1974 to remove Tennessee Supreme Court justices from the plan, yet a 1994 revision to what was now called the "Tennessee Plan" extended it once again to supreme court justices.

The case of DeLaney v. Thompson challenged the statute once more in 1998. The plaintiffs argued that the process was not an "election" in the sense envisioned by the authors of the state constitution and that the court in Higgins v. Dunn had been incompetent to render a decision because of its interest in the outcome of the case. DeLaney v. Thompson was appealed to the Tennessee Supreme Court, which, if it had not recused itself in the case of Higgins v. Dunn recused itself altogether and entirely now. The governor appointed five temporary replacements to hear this case. That body declined to rule on the constitutionality of the Tennessee Plan but rather remanded the case on a technicality.

In 2014, Tennessee voters approved an amendment to the Tennessee Constitution, which codified the Tennessee Plan while adding to it a provision that gubernatorial appointments must be confirmed by the General Assembly.

Only one member of the Tennessee Supreme Court has ever been removed under the Tennessee Plan. Former Justice Penny White was removed in 1996 in a campaign reminiscent of that used a few years earlier in California to remove former Chief Justice Rose Bird, and for largely the same reason: a demonstrated unwillingness to uphold death sentences.

== Justices ==
=== Current composition ===
As of July 1, 2026, the justices of the Tennessee Supreme Court are:

Name	Born	Start date	Chief term	Term ends (Note: Term ends Aug. 31 of the year listed.)	Grand Division	Appointer	Law school	Succeeded
Jeffrey S. Bivins, Chief Justice	August 31, 1960 (age 66)	July 16, 2014	2016–2021; 2025–present	2030	Middle	Bill Haslam (R)	Vanderbilt	William C. Koch Jr.
Sarah K. Campbell	1982 (age 43–44)	February 10, 2022	–	2030	Middle	Bill Lee (R)	Duke	Cornelia Clark
Dwight E. Tarwater	April 28, 1955 (age 71)	September 1, 2023	–	2030	East	Bill Lee (R)	Tennessee	Sharon G. Lee
Mary L. Wagner	1984 (age 41–42)	September 1, 2024	–	2034	West	Bill Lee (R)	Memphis	Roger A. Page
Kyle Hixson	1983 (age 42–43)	July 1, 2026	–	2030	East	Bill Lee (R)	Tennessee	Holly M. Kirby

== See also ==
- Government of Tennessee
- Courts of Tennessee
- Tennessee Plan
- Governor of Tennessee
- Tennessee Attorney General
