= Janice M. Holder =

American judge (born 1949)

Chief Justice of Tennessee on the Tennessee Supreme Court
- In office 2008–2010

Justice of the Tennessee Supreme Court
- In office 1996–2008
- Appointed by: Don Sundquist

Personal details
- Born: August 29, 1949 (age 77) McDonald, Pennsylvania, USA
- Education: University of Pittsburgh; Duquesne University School of Law

Janice Marie Holder (born August 29, 1949) is an American judge who served as a circuit court judge for Tennessee's Division II Circuit Court in the 30th district, served as the third woman justice on the Tennessee Supreme Court from 1996 until 2014, and was the first female Chief Justice of Tennessee on the Tennessee Supreme Court from 2008 until 2010.

== Education ==
Janice M. Holder grew up in Robinson Township outside of McDonald, PA. She attended McDonald Elementary. She walked to school every day. As a child, she played tennis, roller skated, played basketball, and played piano. She was an only child. Holder's mother, a singer, and father, a drummer, met in a big band. Her childhood home was a house that her parents bought from her great-grandmother. Her father worked as a rigger in a steel mill. Holder attended Fort Cherry High School in McDonald, PA.

Holder, a native of McDonald, Pennsylvania, attended Allegheny College in Meadville, Pennsylvania from 1967 to 1968. She played basketball and tennis at Allegheny. In 1968, Holder transferred to University of Pittsburgh in Pennsylvania. She pledged Kappa Kappa Gamma, an international women's sorority. Over the spring and summer in 1970, Holder studied abroad for a term at the University of Pittsburgh semester program in Rouen, France, and at the University of Paris, where she received highest honors. Holder's interest in French stemmed from her grandmother who was born in France and moved to Pennsylvania at age eight. Holder graduated in 1971 summa cum laude with a Bachelor of Science from the University of Pittsburgh and was named a University Scholar.

Her original career plan was to research psychology, but she was rejected by the graduate schools she applied to for a master's in psychology because her test scores had not been provided to the schools to which she applied. After this rejection, Holder spent a year searching for a new career path applying to be a flight attendant at Pan Am Airways, a law school, a paralegal school, and a French graduate school. She was accepted to each of these opportunities, and Holder chose to pursue law school. Holder began at Duquesne University School of Law in autumn of 1972. In law school, Holder enjoyed tort law, contract law, and estates and trust law. Holder received her Juris Doctor in 1975. Over the summer at law school, Holder served as an intern to a federal magistrate working on pro se petitions. From 1973 to 1975, Holder was on the Duquesne Law Review, and served as the Recent Decisions Editor from 1974 until 1975. Holder was a first generation lawyer in her family.

== Early career ==
After law school at Duquesne University, Holder started her legal career in a clerkship for Chief Judge Herbert P. Sorg on the United States District Court of the Western District of Pennsylvania. Chief Judge Herbert P. Sorg inspired Holder to become a judge eventually after being a lawyer. In her clerkship, Holder was able to absorb everything about being in the courtroom as a judge regarding the procedure and the decorum. In 1977, she finished her job as a judicial clerk and made her way in the private practice of law in Pittsburgh.

After her two year law clerkship, Holder accepted a position at a two-person law firm, Catalano & Catalano, in Pittsburgh as an associate attorney. Her first case was a jury trial in federal court. It was a labor management relation case section 301 about fair representation, and the firm represented the plaintiff.

Holder was getting frostbite on a regular basis in Pittsburgh, and this prompted her to move south to Memphis, TN in1979. Until 1990, Holder worked as a private practice lawyer in Memphis. Initially, Holder had a difficult time getting an interview for a job. Holder felt that because the "first wave of women" were already hired, no other law firms were actively hiring women. She found employment in Memphis at the law firm Holt, Bachelor, Spicer, and Ryan as an attorney for working first on aviation cases. The firm hired Holder to represent a plaintiff in the Memphis Mid-Air Collision, a personal injury case concerning an airplane collision. After one year, defense law became Holder's main practice. She tried cases in the trial courts in Memphis and argued cases on appeal in the Court of Appeals. She argued and wrote the brief for a case before the Tennessee Supreme Court.

After working at the Holt Bachelor firm, Holder opened a private practice of law as a solo practitioner. She went back and forth between law firms and private practice before running as a judge for the Circuit Court. As a solo practitioner, Holder specialized in domestic relation cases. Having a knowledge of domestic relations cases helped Holder as a judge in the Division II Circuit Court. As an aspiring lawyer in Memphis, Holder joined the Memphis Bar Association. She served on the Board of Directors and as Editor of the Memphis Bar Forum. Bar Forum. Holder was also a chair on the Lawyers Helping Lawyers Committee.

== Circuit Court ==
In 1990, Janice M. Holder was elected to Division II of the Circuit Court for the 30th Judicial District at Memphis. She ran for the open seat In Division II though she did not have any political connections in Memphis. She won the election in 1990 and was took the oath of office in September 1990.

As a judge on the circuit court, Holder established an alternative dispute resolution pilor project. This leading project in Shelby County was intended to identify the usefulness of mediation, early neutral evaluation, and arbitration. While serving in the Division II of Circuit Court, Judge Holder received several distinctions for her outstanding work. In 1990, she was selected for the Memphis Bar Association Sam A Myar Award due to her advocacy and service to the legal profession and broader community. In 1992, Judge Holder received the Chancellor Charles A. Rond Award as an Outstanding Jurist on behalf of the Memphis Bar Association. The Tennessee Supreme Court appointed Judge Holder as the coordinating judge for breast implant cases in West Tennessee in 1993. Judge Holder was a member of the National Conference of Chief Justices Mass Tort Litigation Committee in 1996. Judge Holder also was a member of the CCJ Silicone Gel Breast Implant Subcommittee in 1996 and was selected as the subcommittee chair, .

She served as a Special Justice during the November 1994 session on the Tennessee Supreme Court. She applied to become a justice on the Tennessee Supreme Court in 1996.

== Judicial career ==
In 1990, Holder was elected to the position of Circuit Court Judge, Division II, Thirtieth Judicial District. This district consists of Shelby County, Tennessee, and Division II deals primarily with civil cases. In 1996 she was one of three nominees for a vacancy on the Tennessee Supreme Court submitted to then-Governor of Tennessee Don Sundquist under the Tennessee Plan; she was the person subsequently selected by him, and her service on the Supreme Court began in December 1996. In August 1998, having been recommended for retention under the process outlined in the Tennessee Plan, she was approved by the voters of the state for a full eight-year term. In August 2006, having again been recommended for another eight-year term, she was again approved by the voters with a majority exceeding 75% and receiving a majority of affirmative votes in each of the state's 95 counties. On June 26, 2013 Holder announced that she would not seek retention in August 2014 and would retire when her term ended.

== Tennessee Supreme Court ==
In 1996, Janice M. Holder was appointed as a Justice by Governor Sundquist to the Tennessee Supreme Court. Justice Holder served from 1996 until 2014 on the Tennessee Supreme Court. From 2008 until 2010, Holder was the Chief Justice on the Tennessee Supreme Court. Chief Justice Holder was the first woman in Tennessee to be a Chief Justice. In accordance with the Tennessee Plan, Justice Holder went up for retention election in 1998 and 2006. In both elections Holder was retained by state voters. Justice Holder authored over 335 court opinions for the Tennessee Supreme Court. Justice Holder was instrumental in creating the Tennessee Supreme Court's Access for Justice Commission.

=== Appointment ===
==== Political climate ====
Janice M. Holder applied for the Tennessee Supreme Court in 1994 when Justice Charles O'Brien announced his retirement, but she did not get the spot on the bench. The Tennessee Plan came into effect when the search for a new justice commenced. There was also litigation over the constitutionality and procedures of the Tennessee Plan during the search for a new justice. These legal challenges reviewed the evaluation process for judges. A Special Supreme Court was appointed to rule on the Tennessee Plan, making rulings leading up to the election. Unaware that Tennessee Plan had already been implemented by the Special Supreme Court, Governor McWherter announced his appointment of Penny J. White to the bench. Other potential justices, including Holder, still applied for the position as a Supreme Court justices so that the process of the new Tennessee Plan could be followed. Holder knew White would get the appointment, but she wanted to apply because to go through the application process under the Tennessee Plan to help her if she were to apply for a subsequent vacancy.

Janice M. Holder was appointed by Governor Don Sundquist in 1996 to the Tennessee Supreme Court. When Holder was appointed under the Tennessee Plan, judicial selection was executed through merit selection in which the governor picked from three nominees chosen by the nominating commission. Holder was preceded by Justice Penny J. White. Penny J. White was removed from the bench in her retention election due to a conservative campaign against her.

In light of the capital punishment campaign against White, Republican Governor Don Sundquist publicly promised before the retention election that he would not appoint someone to the judiciary unless he was sure that the nominee supported the death penalty. When Governor Sundquist appointed Justice Holder, the extremely politicized retention election of Justice White had left the political climate of the judiciary marked by one's stance on capital punishment. Justice Holder is regarded as a judge with a slight conservative ideological leaning. In her oral history, Holder states that White's loss was felt by many women across the state, and that Holder now had the pressure of being the only woman on the Tennessee Supreme Court.

==== Legal battle ====
When former Justice Penny J. White lost her retention election, the Tennessee Attorney General had announced the vacant seat on the Tennessee Supreme Court would be filled by a nominee from the Eastern or Western Grand Division for more geographical representation on the bench. Following the Special Supreme Court's October 2, 1996, opinion, however, the Tennessee Judicial Selection Commission decided to only review applicants from the Eastern Grand Division. Because Holder was an applicant from the Western Grand Division, she filed a lawsuit so the vacancy on the Tennessee Supreme Court could be fulfilled by either Eastern or Western Grand Division applicants. Holder filed the case in Davidson County in chancery court. An appeal was filed with a reach down motion which gave the Tennessee Supreme Court the authority to rule on the case. The Tennessee Supreme Court ruled that applicants from both the Eastern Grand Division and Western Grand Division must be considered. The Court also concluded that the State Constitution and the Tennessee Plan were in accordance. Since Holder already submitted her application for the court, this lawsuit ensured that her application would be considered.

After this struggle to be considered, Holder was eventually appointed to the Tennessee Supreme Court in 1996 by Governor Don Sundquist. Following this struggle about geographical representation, the Tennessee Bar Association reacted by creating judicial selection task force to study merit selection, and the Tennessee Bar Association continued to support merit selection. In accordance with the Tennessee Plan, Justice Holder went up for retention election in 1998 and 2006. In both elections Holder was retained by state voters.

=== Transition ===
Transitioning from the Circuit Court to the Tennessee Supreme Court was difficult for Holder. The Tennessee Supreme Court is an appellate court. Holder's colleagues on the Court were Justice Drowota, Justice Anderson, Justice Lyle Reid, and Justice Birch. Her colleagues were from older generations than Holder. Holder had not practiced as a judge on an appellate court before, but Justice Frank Drowota helped Holder make her transition in supporting her. Holder hired an administrative assistant and law clerks to adjust. Her administrative assistant was Kathy Collier, and her first law clerk was Doug Hanson. Holder stated that the transition was difficult. Many of the cases Holder was deciding were criminal cases which she had not primarily handled before. It took time for Holder to learn all of the procedures of the Court. Holder had to grow into her position, but she felt that she was always meant to be a judge.

=== Advocacy ===
While serving on the court, Justice Holder has prioritized advocating for justice. She was a key player in creating the Access to Justice Commission for the Tennessee Supreme Court. Her advocacy promoted unique ways to administer legal services to individuals needing civil legal counsel who had trouble accessing justice. The Tennessee Supreme Court made access to justice its first priority. This commission resolved issues concerning access to justice in Tennessee. Holder acted as the Court's liaison for the commission. Justice Holder stated that providing legal services to the those who qualified for free legal services was the most satisfying work in her career.

Justice Holder also helped introduce the Tennessee Lawyers Assistance Program with the goal of helping people in the legal profession with personal problems or health issues. While working as a partner in a law firm, one of Holder's partners committed suicide. After this, Holder was instrumental in creating a program called Lawyers Helping Lawyers in Shelby County, TN a committee of the Memphis Bar Association. When working on the Tennessee Supreme Court, Holder wanted to start a statewide program modeled after Lawyers Helping Lawyers. However, the other justices were not particularly supportive of Holder's idea. While on a retreat with the justices on the Supreme Court, Holder hosted an out-of-state speaker at the retreat to explain how the Lawyers Assistance Program in Texas functions and why it is so necessary. After the retreat, the other justices hastened to create a commission to assist lawyers with personal mental health issues, substance abuse issues, and other personal life issues. Other states used Tennessee's model as a gold standard when creating other state lawyer assistance programs.

=== Chief Justice ===
In 2008, Janice M. Holder became the first woman on the Tennessee Supreme Court to serve as the Chief Justice. As Chief Justice, Holder assigned opinions to the justices, led the administrative conferences, led the opinion conferences, and guided the justices in areas where the Court and other areas of government meet. Justice Holder served as the Chief Justice from September 2008 until August 2010. As a judge, Holder's philosophy was not to search for a result, but to find a better approach to a case. Chief Justice Gary R. Wade stated that Justice Holder mastered, "the art of judicial restraint, writing concise, authoritative opinions, and never reaching beyond issues presented to the court." When Justice Holder announced her retirement, Justice Wade commented that Justice Holder was a fearless champion of women's rights in the judiciary.

=== Distinctions ===
As the first woman appointed as Chief Justice to the Tennessee Supreme Court, the Tennessee General Assembly passed Joint Resolution 1401 honoring her achievement. During her term on the bench, Justice Holder served on the Board of Directors of the Conference of Chief Justices in 2011 as well as the fulfilling the role of the Second Vice President for this conference. Additionally, Justice Holder received a plethora of awards and recognition on the bench including being recognized by the Southern Regional Conference of the National Association of Women Judges as the leader of state courts, receiving Jurist of the Year by the Southeastern Region of the American Board of Trial Advocates, and awarded the Marion Griffin-Frances Loring Award by the Association for Women Attorneys.

=== Legal and social impact ===
Holder describes many instances of gender discrimination working in the legal profession in her oral history with the Tennessee Bar foundation. However, once Justice Sharon G. Lee was appointed in 2008, the Tennessee Supreme Court had the a majority of women justices for the first time while Justice Holder served on the five member court along with Justice Cornelia A. Clark and Justice Sharon G. Lee. Justice Holder retired from the Supreme Court in 2014 totaling twenty-four years of service. Her position on the bench was succeeded by Justice Holly Kirby. Her legacy on the Tennessee Supreme Court, according to Justice Wade, will be remembered by her valiant promotion of women's rights, her leadership in the Access to Justice Initiative, and her servant leadership to all Tennesseans.

== Authored court opinions ==
Janice M. Holder has authored over 335 Tennessee Supreme Court opinions. Five of her more recent notable cases in which she authored the opinion include:

- Jose Rodriguez a.k.a. Alex Lopez v. State of Tennessee, 437 S.W.3d 450 (Tenn. 2014)
- State of Tennessee v. Glover P. Smith, 436 S.W.d3 751 (Tenn. 2014).
- State of Tennessee v. John T. Freeland, Jr., 451 S.W.3d 791 (Tenn. 2014).
- William Caldwell Hancock v. Board of Professional Responsibility of the Supreme Court of Tennessee, 447 S.W.3d 844 (Tenn. 2014).
- Wilma Griffin v. Campbell Clinic, P.A., 439 S.W.3d 899 (Tenn. 2014).

In Rodriguez v. State, a Mexican citizen plead guilty to a misdemeanor charge. He was granted judicial diversion, completed the diversion, and his record was subsequently expunged. The petitioner then petitioned more than three years after the plea for post-conviction relief. This petition stated that the trial counsel did not adequately advise the petitioner about possible immigration consequences resulting from the guilty plea. The trial court barred this petition, and the Tennessee Court of Criminal Appeals upheld that a petitioner with an expunged record is not able to access conviction relief. The Tennessee Supreme Court granted the petitioner the right to appeal, and the Tennessee Supreme Court ruled that expunged guilty pleas after having completed judicial diversion is not a conviction that is subject to collateral review under the Post-Conviction Procedure Act. The Supreme Court affirmed the judgement given by the Court of Criminal Appeals.

In State v. Smith, the defendant was convicted on two counts of fabricating evidence and six counts of making a false report about the disappearance of his wife. The trial court imposed a one year sentence in county jail with six years of probation afterwards. The defendant motioned for a new trial, and the trial court affirmed convictions of false report but dismissed the fabricating evidence convictions. The state and defendant appealed. The Court of Criminal Appeals reinstated the defendant's fabricating evidence convictions, dismissed the false report convictions, and reaffirmed remaining convictions and sentences. The Supreme Court of Tennessee ruled that the two false report convictions should be dismissed due to insufficient evidence and that three of the false report convictions were multiplicities. The Supreme Court affirmed the Court of Criminal Appeals in every other aspect.

Justice Janice M. Holder also wrote the court opinion in State v. Freeland. The defendant was convicted on counts of first degree premeditated murder, first degree felony murder, especially aggravated kidnapping, and tampering with evidence. The trial court imposed a death sentence. The Court of Criminal Appeals affirmed the lower court's conviction and sentence. In an appeal to the Tennessee Supreme Court, the Tennessee Court of Criminal Appeals was affirmed in their judgement. But the Tennessee Supreme Court moved the case back to the trial court on behalf of an entry of corrected judgment in which the trial court merged the convictions for first degree murder into a singular conviction.

Hancock v. Board of Professional Responsibility of the Supreme Court of Tennessee was a federal bankruptcy court in which the Board of Professional Responsibility instituted a disciplinary action against an attorney who was denied in his application for bankruptcy. The attorney wrote an email to the judge who blocking the fee application demanding an apology. When the Board decided that the attorney violated several Rules of Professional Conduct, the attorney was suspended from practicing law for thirty days. The chancery court added violations for other misconduct, and the attorney appealed to the Tennessee Supreme Court. The Tennessee Supreme Court affirmed the panel's conclusion in finding the attorney in violation of rules and that he was sanctionable for his conduct.

In Griffin v. Campbell, civil action was filed by the plaintiff in the general sessions court. This civil action claimed health care liability against the defendant. The trial court ruled favor of the defendant. The plaintiff filed a notice of appeal following the ruling, and appealed to the circuit court but was dismissed. The Court of Appeals reversed the trial court's judgement. The Tennessee Supreme Court affirmed the judgement of the Court of Appeals sending the case back to the trial court.

== Personal life ==
Janice M. Holder is active in her community contributing to various organizations to expand access to justice in Tennessee. She is a member of the Metal Museum Board of Trustees and a former member of the Board of Commissioners of Memphis Area Transit Authority. Holder enjoys practicing martial arts. In American Combative Arts System, Holder has a sixth degree Black Belt, and she teaches children's karate classes. Holder was on the Board of directors from 2012 to 2015 for the Memphis Council for International Visitors. Introducing international visitors to the United States and its culture is a civic activity that Holder enjoys. She also served as the chair of the Memphis chapter for the International Women's Forum from 2006 to 2013. Since 2010, she has been the honorary chair for Tennessee for iCivics. Holder is also an equestrian. After completing law school she purchased a horse and kept several until 1989. Holder previously served on the Board of Directors of the Memphis in May Barbeque Festival. Having studied French during her education, Holder enjoys visiting France when possible.

== Gender discrimination ==
When Janice M. Holder graduated from law school, she has recounted that she missed the first wave of law firms hiring women. Hirers in the legal and judicial professions in the late 20th century hired or appointed women as tokens to symbolize gender equality. Therefore, women were tokens representing all women not necessarily a minority. In her class at Duquesne University college of law, there were only 13 women. Holder recalled in an article with the Memphis Downtowner that the first woman was already hired when she was job searching out of college, and that legal jobs were not willing to hire a second woman. Applying for clerkships, Holder knew only two of the eight that judges would hire women in Pittsburgh. Holder applied for a job with Chief Judge Herbert Sorg because she knew that he hired women, and her clerkship with Judge Sorg inspired her to become a judge. As a young woman lawyer in Memphis, Holder felt restricted from making appearances in general sessions court because she says people did not like being represented by a woman lawyer.

== See also ==
- Tennessee Women's Hall of Fame
- Tennessee Supreme Court
- National Association of Women Judges
- List of first women lawyers and judges in Tennessee
- List of justices of the Tennessee Supreme Court
