= Penny J. White =

American attorney and judge

Associate Justice Tennessee Supreme Court
- In office 1994–1996
- Appointed by: Ned McWherter
- Preceded by: Justice Charles O'Brien
- Succeeded by: Justice Janice M. Holder

Personal details
- Born: Penny Jo White; May 3, 1956 (age 70) Kingsport, TN
- Party: Democrat
- Spouse: Mike Okun
- Education: East Tennessee State University, University of Tennessee College of Law, Georgetown University Law Center

Penny J. White (born May 3, 1956) is an American attorney and former judge who served as a judge on Tennessee's First Judicial Circuit, a judge for the Tennessee Court of Criminal Appeals, and a justice on the Tennessee Supreme Court. she was the second woman to serve on the Tennessee Supreme Court. White was removed from office in a judicial retention election in 1996 as the only justice to lose a retention election in Tennessee under the Tennessee Plan. After her time in the judiciary, White served as a professor at the University of Tennessee College of Law until retiring in 2022.

== Early life and education ==
Penny J. White was born in Kingsport, TN on May 3, 1956. White's father, Carmen White born in 1919, was an employee of Eastman Base Mountain Construction Company as an electrician. Her mother, Jean Bush White, graduated high school at age thirteen, and she was fully employed at the age of fourteen by Clinchfield Railroad. When White was growing up, her mother worked as an architectural secretary. White's maternal grandparents, Charles H. Bush and Ethel Bush, were farmers in Scott County located in southwest Virginia. Her paternal grandfather, Herman Sevier White, owned and operated a county store in Greene County, TN. White's paternal grandmother, Edda White, was a homemaker.

White attended Sullivan County Southern Central School in Blountville, TN for high school. During high school, White held an office in student government. White graduated from Central in 1974. After graduating high school, she attended East Tennessee State University located in Johnson City, TN for her undergraduate education. She was involved with student government becoming the first woman to become the president of the student body. At East Tennessee State University, White graduated summa cum laude in 1978 with a Bachelor of Science degree double majoring in political science and criminal justice and minoring in speech.

In 1981, White graduated from the University of Tennessee College of Law to receive her Doctor of Jurisprudence degree. While at University of Tennessee College of Law, White was the editor of the Tennessee Law Review. After law school, she worked in private practice for two years. White had the opportunity to be an E. Barrett Prettyman Fellow at Georgetown University Law Center. She wrote her thesis on the right to counsel. In 1987, White received her Master of Laws (L.L.M.) degree from Georgetown University Law Center upon completing the fellowship program.

== Early career ==
White engaged in the private practice of law in Johnson City, Tennessee, from 1981 to 1983 and from 1985 to 1990. From 1983 to 1985 she served as supervising attorney and clinical instructor in the Georgetown University Law Center Criminal Justice Clinic.

=== Attorney ===
Penny J. White was an attorney after graduating from the University of Tennessee College of Law at Richard Pectol & Associates, a private practice in Johnson City, TN, from 1981 to 1983. When attending Georgetown University Law Center, White worked as an E. Barrett Prettyman Fellow for the Georgetown University Criminal Justice Clinic from 1983 until 1985. After finishing her Master of Laws degree, White returned to Johnson City, TN and applied for several teaching jobs. Instead of teaching, White decided to start her own private practice of law from 1985 until 1990. During this time, White argued Houston v. Lack in front of the United States Supreme Court which solidified her reputation in the legal community.

==== Private practice ====
After obtaining her Doctor of Jurisprudence degree at the University of Tennessee, Penny J. White worked as a private practice attorney between 1981 and 1983 in Johnson City, TN at Richard Pectol & Associates. At Richard Pectol & Associates, White worked with criminal law and was introduced to family law. White took a break from private practice in Johnson City to further her education and expand her career choices. Returning to Johnson City in 1985, White continued in the private practice of law as a solo-practitioner. White specialized in civil rights, criminal defense, and family law as a solo-practitioner. As an attorney, White gained status after arguing Houston v. Lack before the United States Supreme Court and left an impression on the Supreme Court justices. White served as a judge on every level of Tennessee's court system after leaving the private practice of law. White decided to enter the judicial system to improve the administration of justice, but also because she was treated differently for not being a male lawyer.

==== Houston v. Lack ====
While in the private practice of law, White briefed and argued before the United States Supreme Court in Houston v. Lack in April 1988.

=== First Judicial District ===
Penny J. White was the first female judge to serve on Tennessee's First Judicial District. Tennessee's First Judicial Circuit Court selects judges through partisan or non-partisan elections depending on the county's statutes. White ran to be on the First Judicial District when Judge Jack Music announced his retirement. She won the election for the judgeship in East Tennessee. Judge White served on the First Judicial District from 1990 until 1992. After 1992, White was appointed to the Tennessee Court of Criminal Appeals by Governor Ned McWherter. The First Judicial District has jurisdiction in Carter county, Johnson county, Unicoi county, and Washington county. On the circuit court, Judge White had jurisdiction over criminal and civil matters. In the Tennessee Judicial Conference, Judge White had a mentor Judge George Garret from Sullivan County, TN.

== Tennessee Court of Criminal Appeals ==
In 1992, Penny J. White was appointed to the Tennessee Court of Criminal Appeals by Governor Ned McWherter. Justice John Byers retired from the Tennessee Court of Criminal Appeals when Penny J. White filled his seat. White was selected to serve on the Court of Criminal Appeals in Tennessee through assisted appointment. The process of assisted appointment consists of a governor-selected nominee out of three finalists being confirmed by the Tennessee General Assembly. There had only been one other woman as an appellate judge in Tennessee before White, Judge Martha Daughtrey. On the Court of Criminal Appeals, Judge White confirmed a majority of the criminal convictions she reviewed. The workload of the Tennessee Court of Criminal Appeals was significantly different from the First Judicial District. With only one judicial clerk, White was expected to write two to three court opinions weekly including the time to review all volumes of appeals and edit rewrites of draft opinions. Judge White sat alongside Judge Tipton and Judge Gary Wade. On this court, Judge Tipton pushed White to be better as a new judge to edit and rewrite many of her court opinions. She served on that court until 1994 when McWherter selected her to fill a vacancy on the Tennessee Supreme Court.

== Tennessee Supreme Court ==
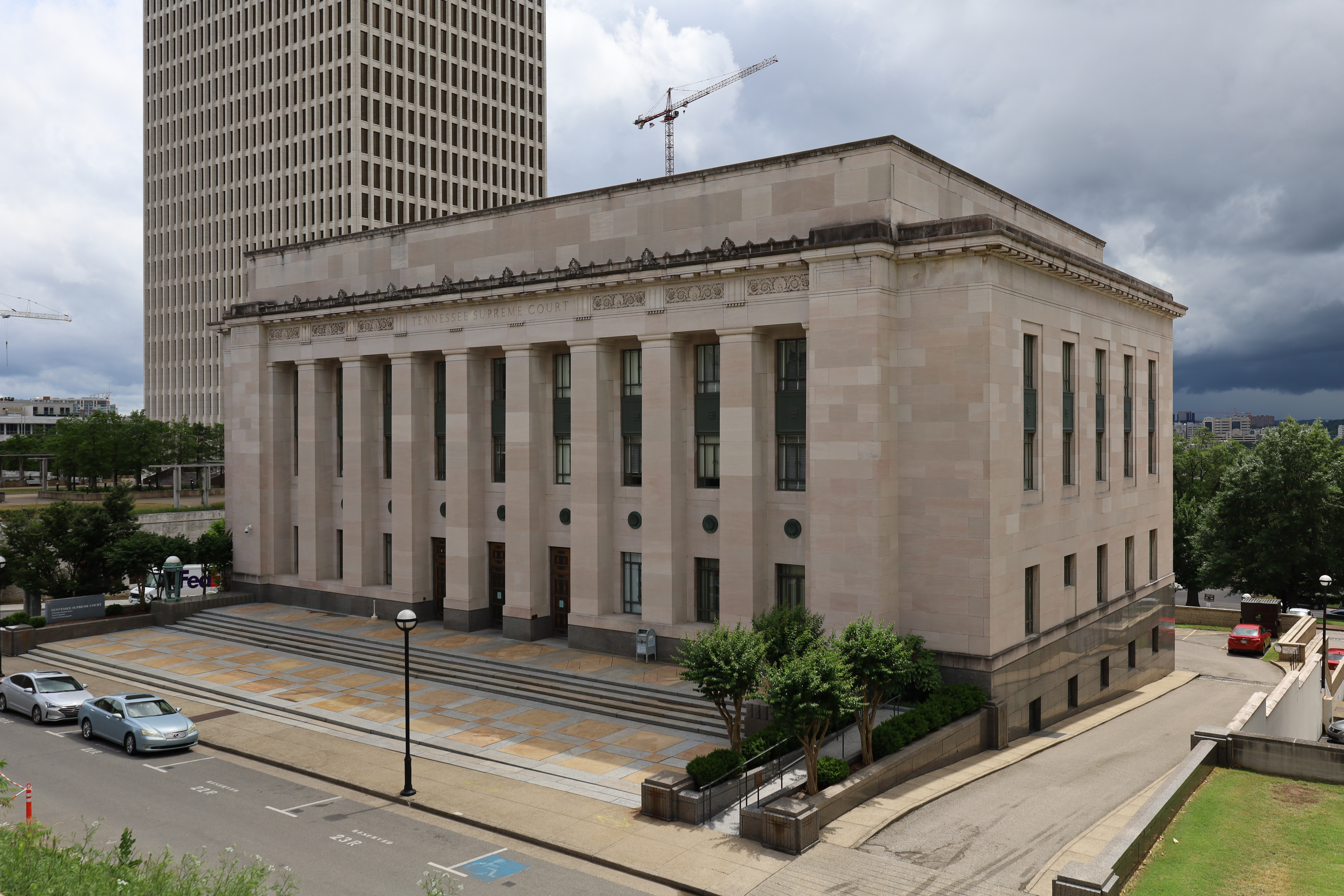
Tennessee Supreme Court

=== Judicial selection ===
Penny J. White was appointed by Governor Ned McWherter in 1994 to the Tennessee Supreme Court. She was the second woman ever to serve on the state's highest court. Her appointment filled the seat of retired Justice Charles O'Brien. The Tennessee Supreme Court has five justices who are selected through assisted appointment. Penny J. White was confirmed by the Tennessee General Assembly to serve on the Tennessee Supreme Court as the second woman justice after Justice Daughtrey who encouraged White to fill Justice O'Brien's seat. Besides White, the other candidates to fill the spot on the bench were Justice Holder and Chancellor Richard Ladd. Justice White served on the bench alongside Chief Justice Riley Anderson, Chief Justice Adolpho Birch, Justice Frank Drowota, and Justice Lyle Reid.

=== Published court opinions ===
Penny J. White wrote about 200 reported and unreported court opinions as a judge between 1992 and 1996. The following list are some of the Tennessee Supreme Court opinions authored by Justice White.

- McClellan v. Board of Regents, 921 S.W.2d 684 (Tenn. 1996).
- McClung v. Delta Square Ltd. Parnership, 937 S.W.2d 891 (Tenn. 1997).
- Meighan v. U.S. Sprint Co., 942 S.W.2d 476 (Tenn. 1997).
- Phipps v. State, 883 S.W.2d 138 (Tenn. 1994).
- Ramsey v. Beavers, 931 S.W.2d 527 (Tenn. 1996).
- Ray, by Hoilman v. BIC Corp., 931 S.W.2d 527 (Tenn. 1996).
- Wimley v. Rudolph, 931 S.W.2d 513 (Tenn. 1996).

McClellan v. Board challenged the procedural and substantive processes under the Uniform Administration Procedures Act. McClellan was found guilty of sexual harassment during his teaching in the Department of Health, Physical Education, and Recreation at Middle Tennessee State University. The Court of Appeals and the Tennessee Supreme Court upheld this ruling. The Supreme Court found that substantial and material evidence supports finding a violation of sexual harassment policy of the Tennessee State Board of Regents and of Middle Tennessee State University. Another issue addressed in McClellan is whether the administrative hearing had appropriate procedures. The Supreme Court reversed the lower court's decision that vacated one of the hearing findings and the sanction order. The Supreme Court remanded the case so the sanctions were reviewed in the administrative trial.

McClung v. Delta Square Ltd. Partnership changed the precedent for liability cases for acts of violence committed by third parties against victims. A victim of abduction from a Wal-Mart parking lot, Dorothy McClung was raped and murdered by Joseph Harper. McClung's husband, the plaintiff, sought relief from the defendants, owners, operators, and tenants for negligence of not providing parking lot security. This case decided that "the question of duty and of whether defendants have breached that duty by taking or not taking certain actions is one for the jury to determine based upon proof presented at trial." This decision reversed a precedent that limited the care for security that business owners should owe to customers. In White's oral history with the Tennessee Supreme Court Historical Society, this was the only case she mentioned by name.

Meighan v. U.S. Sprint Co. reviewed the Tennessee Rules of Civil Procedure, specifically Rule 23. The Court reviewed Rule 23 in its application to actions that cause injury to property in deciding the potential reasons for action and the adequate amount of damages caused by the action. The Court denied a rehearing.

In Phipps v. State, the state of Tennessee tried defendant David Willard Phipps Jr. for first degree murder. Tennessee did not charge the death penalty. The trial jury found Phipps guilty sentencing him to life imprisonment. The Court of Criminal Appeals reversed the defendant's conviction which remanded a new trial. The Tennessee Supreme Court reviewed the State's decision as the plaintiff in pursuing the death penalty after it was not previously pursued. The Court found that the state was not exhibiting prosecutorial vindictiveness against Phipps, and the State was allowed to pursue the death penalty in the trial.

In Ramsey v. Beavers, the Court reviewed the issue of the viability of the zone danger test which limited the liability of a defendant when a plaintiff has not been physically injured yet but injury is possible. The plaintiff, Ramsey, and his mother were parked when his mother exited the vehicle to check the mailbox. Defendant Beavers hit Ramsey's mother. Ramsey recounted that tire screeching could be heard from Beaver's car as he witnessed the vehicular accident. The defendant's motion explained that because the plaintiff was not in the immediate threat of physical harm, or the zone of danger, he could not claim relief for the injuries claimed. The Court ruled that in cases where the injury and resulting death is sensorily observed recovery should be allowed for the emotional injuries.

Ray v. Hoilman was a case about the defendant's counsel not receiving all of the information from the discovery and requesting to continue with the trial and all associated deadlines. The Court concluded that without a continuance motion, there would not be reasonable time to prepare for trial for the defense counsel even with due diligence.

Wimley v. Rudolph addressed the issue of whether a plaintiff could add a petition for judicial review with an original action under 42 U.S.C. § 1983 under the Uniform Administration Procedures Act if the sole relief requested in the Section 1983 claim is an award of attorney fees. The plaintiff was a benefits recipient of Aid for Dependent Children. After the plaintiff received for uncle's estate inheritance, the Department of Human services told her that the benefits would not be affected. Wimley v. Rudolph affirmed the Court of Appeals' decision which allowed the plaintiff an attorney fees award.

== Retention election ==
The Tennessean voters removed Justice Penny J. White from the Tennessee Supreme Court in a retention election in 1996 as the first justice to be removed from the bench in Tennessee. If she had won in the election, White was expected to become the Chief Justice with the support of her fellow justices. In Tennessee's judicial selection of assisted appointment, judges go up for retention elections at the end of every term. White became a subject of controversy in 1996 when she voted with the court majority in the 3-2 decision in the case of State v. Odom. The court upheld the lower court's conviction on June 3, 1996, for the rape and murder of an elderly woman, but overturned a death sentence for a resentencing trial due to an insufficient case presented by the prosecution. It was the only death penalty decision that White ever participated in as a member of the state supreme court.

=== The Tennessee Plan ===
In 1994, the same year that Justice White was appointed, the General Assembly of Tennessee changed the judicial selection process in Tennessee for the Supreme Court to a merit selection process called the Tennessee Plan. The judicial nomination process was reconstructed to remove the Appellate Court Nominating Commission. Under the Tennessee Plan, the Tennessee Judicial Selection Commission was established as the new judicial nomination committee. Merit-selection operates through assisted appointment which is a governor selecting a nominee with the aid of a selection committee or board. The fifteen members of the Judicial Selection Commission, appointed by the speaker of the Tennessee House and Senate, are nominated by several lawyer groups in Tennessee. Judicial performance evaluation programs were another large institutional reform of the Tennessee Plan. In these evaluation programs, the performance of Tennessee judges could be evaluated by their peers, including lawyers, other judges, and court staff. This evaluation was intended to assist retention elections by providing insider information. White has been outspoken in her professorship and in the media about the Tennessee Plan's affect on the judiciary.

=== Controversy under the Tennessee Plan ===
The reforms to the Tennessee Plan positioned Justice White's judicial selection amongst controversy. Even though her retention election was over a year after the creation of the Tennessee Judicial Evaluation Commission, her judgeship did not undergo review by the commission before being placed on the retention election ballot. The statute that established the commission had language implying only full judicial terms that starting after its implementation could qualify for review. Controversy arose when a different interpretation concluded that only judges who have been evaluated by the commission could go on the retention ballot meaning White would not qualify. Under the latter interpretation, Attorneys John J. Hooker and Lewis Laska both decided to announce their candidacy for the statewide retention election in 1996 in which Justice White would be facing retention. The State Coordinator of Elections, however, refused to grant either attorney an official nominating position. Furthermore, the State Coordinator of Elections communicated that only Justice White could be on the retention election ballot further discrediting the two attorneys.

The attorneys Hooker and Laska sued the State Coordinator of Elections, and their case was permitted to be heard by a Special Supreme Court since the current sitting Justices recused themselves to avoid conflict of interest. This Special Supreme Court ruled that because Justice White had been appointed, neither Hooker nor Laska could appear on the ballot under state law. The Special Supreme Court also noted that Justice White should be required to be evaluated by the commission before going up for election. This court also found that the Tennessee Plan did not violate the constitutions of Tennessee or the United States.

=== The ballot ===
While the attorneys fought their case in the Special Supreme Court, Justice White and several appellate judges filed under two federal courts about the judicial elections occurring in August 1996. Justice White filed that she had a property right to the retention election assured by the Tennessee Plan and Tennessee officials publicly announcing her official candidacy. The federal district court concluded that Justice White was entitled to be on the retention election ballot, and the election was ordered to continue. The federal district court did not comment on the Special Supreme Court's ruling that the General Assembly is entitled to control the proceedings of judicial elections in Tennessee.

=== Political climate of the retention election ===
As a recent appointee, White was the only member of the court who was subject to a retention vote in that year's election. White was the first merit-selected justice to stand in a retention election. Justice White was the only woman on the court with a 26-year age gap between her youngest colleague which made her easily identifiable for the election. Politics played a role in her retention election which White publicly acknowledged following the election. Republicans in Tennessee promoted White's removal from the bench for joining the Court's majority opinion in State v. Odom, a death penalty case involving a criminal rape and murder case. White was targeted for defeat by victims' rights advocates, the Tennessee Conservative Union, and death penalty proponents who opposed the decision.

The capital punishment case State v. Odom led to the campaign to remove Justice White from office. The Tennessee Conservative Union, a Republican anti-tax group, led the smear campaign against White. Their goal in removing White was for Republican Governor Sundquist to make a Republican-favored appointment to the Tennessee Supreme Court. Republican Governor Don Sundquist, who was elected in 1995, opposed White in the 1996 retention election along with several state senators including Senator Bill Frist and Senator Fred Thompson. Sundquist promised Tennesseans to only appoint judges who support the death penalty if given the opportunity. White recounted in her oral history with the Tennessee Supreme Court Historical Society that the battle led by the Tennessee Conservative Union was purely political for the Sundquist administration. Following White's retention election, Governor Sundquist said, "Should a judge look over his shoulder [when making decisions] about whether they're going to be thrown out of office? I hope so."

==== Capital punishment ====
Throughout Tennessee's judicial history, the Tennessee Supreme Court has upheld the death penalty statute. Former Justice White confirms capital punishment as the established precedent in her law review article "A Survey of the Tennessee Supreme Court Death Penalty Cases in the 1990s" written for the Tennessee Law Review. White also acknowledges that the death penalty precedent will be challenged as state and federal law evolves over time. Justice White voted, along with the majority, for a re-sentencing hearing in State v. Odom for the death penalty, but she reaffirmed the lower courts' decision that Odom was guilty. Republicans in Tennessee attacked White, and Governor Sundquist was able to appoint a judge for his party.

Capital punishment in Tennessee is a contentious issue for judges in a politicized climate of retention elections. The Democratic governor who appointed Justice White, Ned McWherter, served two terms without any executions. His son, Mike McWherter, has recounted that his father did not like the concept of capital punishment, but that he was committed to upholding the law and the state constitution. Republican governor Don Sundquist held office when Justice White was up for a retention election. He announced that his faith did not prohibit him from upholding the law, and that once someone is found guilty it was not difficult for him to accept the death penalty. Governor Sundquist oversaw one execution in 2000.

=== The campaign against White and State v. Odom ===
While Justice White was entrenched in litigation due to the Tennessee Plan controversy, The Tennessee Conservative Union aggressively campaigned to remove Penny White from the bench. The group felt Justice White refused to uphold the death penalty which violated the established precedent. White was restrained from campaigning on her own behalf by the judicial code of ethics, but her opponents "flooded the state" with materials urging her defeat. The judicial ethics at the time explicitly forbid jurists from publicly speaking about an ongoing case and publicly announcing their views on political and legal issues. White lost with 55% of voters electing to remove her. The voter turnout of her retention election was 19%. Justice White was the first and only appellate judge to lose a retention election and subsequently be removed from the bench in Tennessee.

The Tennessee Conservative Union's campaign against Justice White utilized a narrative that White was soft on crime. The attack on Justice White began on June 13, 1996, when the Nashville Banner wrote an article about State v. Odom claiming that the Tennessee Supreme Court did not consider the crime heinous enough for the death penalty. The Republican Party in Tennessee sent out brochures in the mail asking voters to oppose Penny J. White in the retention on August 1, 1996. These brochures were titled "Just say NO!", saying "Vote for Capital Punishment by Voting NO on August 1 for Supreme Court Justice Penny White." The Tennessee Republican Party in their brochures for the retention election misrepresented the judicial decisions in State v. Odom by printing that "Penny White felt the crime wasn't heinous enough for the death penalty-- so she struck it down." Wanting to stay in line with judicial ethics, White did not lead a campaign for her retention election by speaking out about what happened in the case of State v. Odom which was ongoing during the 1996 election.

The mailed brochures did not report that the Supreme Court ruled that Odom's case required a new sentencing hearing due to a legal error. In Odom, White voted in accordance with a majority of the justices in a 3–2 vote. Justice Birch authored the majority opinion of the court citing that the evidentiary ruling was in error and the evidence presented was not sufficient to prove the crime as heinous, atrocious, and cruel. Justice White did not author any part of either the majority or concurring opinion for the Tennessee Supreme Court in State v. Odom. In the majority and concurring opinion, no justice expressed that the crime committed in Odom was not heinous enough for the death penalty. White clarified that the majority opinion in defining the evidence as not sufficient to rule the crime as heinous, atrocious, and cruel enough for the death penalty was intended to signal to the prosecutors to collect better evidence for the re-sentencing trial. The justices agreed there were procedural errors that warranted a new sentencing hearing. This case was the only death penalty case that White ruled on during her time on the Tennessee Supreme Court. White's opponents led voters to believe she was responsible for the lack of any executions for the last 36 years in Tennessee, even though her time on the Supreme Court bench consisted of 19 months. White has also maintained that the majority opinion in Odom was not trying to overturn the death penalty as unconstitutional. As a result of the campaign against her, the "no" vote prevailed in the August 1, 1996, retention election, causing her to be removed from the court. Only 19 percent of the state's voters voted in White's retention election. Governor Sundquist subsequently appointed Justice Janice Holder to fill the vacated seat.

==== Results ====
Results by county: Remove: 50–60% 60–70% 70–80%; Retain: 50–60% 60–70%

Tennessee Supreme Court Associate Justice, Penny J. White retention election
| Choice | Votes | % |
|---|---|---|
| For | 239,614 | 44.84 |
| Against | 294,781 | 55.16 |
| Total | 534,395 | 100.00 |

=== Impact on the judiciary ===
In the retention election, Justice White's retention election "Just say NO!" campaign from the conservatives is perceived as an attack on judicial independence comparable to the retention election of California Supreme Court Justice Rose Bird. Both judges have been linked by scholars as having faced undue opposition due to their stances on the death penalty. Both of their losses in retention elections represent a broader picture in the judiciary of news media sensationalism, heightened judicial campaigns, and misreporting of judicial decisions. This perception of the judiciary following Justice White's retention election has led to increased efforts for visibility through judicial outreach due to the challenges that come with partisan and non-partisan elections.

The defeat of White's judicial retention election was decried by people concerned that election of judges politicizes the judiciary, as well as by opponents of the death penalty. In a speech before the American Bar Association two days after White's defeat, U.S. Supreme Court Justice John Paul Stevens stated that he considered the popular election of judges to be "profoundly unwise." He stated: "A campaign promise to be 'tough on crime' or 'enforce the death penalty' is evidence of bias that should disqualify the candidate from sitting in criminal cases." In discussing politicized Justice Stevens stated that the judiciary did not adequately anticipate that judges, who are responsible for protecting individual rights, must consider which judicial opinion will yield the most votes in an election.

When Adolpho A. Birch, who was chief justice of the court at the time of the State v. Odom decision, came up for a judicial retention vote in 1998, death penalty supporters campaigned for his removal. However, he was the beneficiary of a public awareness campaign on the importance of judicial retention elections. The campaign was mounted by the Tennessee Bar Association, Farm Bureau, and League of Women Voters in Tennessee, and he retained his seat with 54 percent of the vote.

== Law school faculty career ==
Penny J. White was an adjunct professor at East Tennessee State University for the Department of Political Science and Criminal Justice from 1982 until 1990. Former Justice White was employed as faculty at the National Judicial College at the University of Nevada from 1993 until 2018. While serving on the Tennessee Supreme Court, former Justice White was also an adjunct professor at the University of Tennessee College of Law from 1990 until 1996. After losing her retention election in 1996, Penny J. White did not want to return to the courts or represent clients again.

The Dean at the University of Tennessee Law School, Dick Wirtz, consulted with White about her options in pursuing teaching. Dean Wirtz suggested that former Justice White write and publish scholarly articles in addition to teaching at a highly ranked law school. After leaving the state supreme court in 1996, White held one-year law school visiting professorships at Washington and Lee University (1997–1998), West Virginia University (1998–1999), and the University of Denver (1999–2000). From 1997 until 2018, Former Justice White served as faculty at Harvard Law School for the Winter Trial Advocacy Workshop during the month of January. Washington & Lee offered former Justice White a one-year job as a professor as an introduction to an academic career. From 1997 to 1998, White was a visiting professor of law at Washington and Lee School of Law. After completing her one year at Washington & Lee, White moved to West Virginia University and created more professional relationships within academic circles. She worked as a visiting professor of law from 1998 to 1999. White was offered a new teaching position at the University of Denver Law School in 1998. At the University of Denver, White was encouraged in her professional relationships to apply for a job as a professor at the University of Tennessee. White was presented an offer from the University of Tennessee to start teaching as a professor in August 2000.

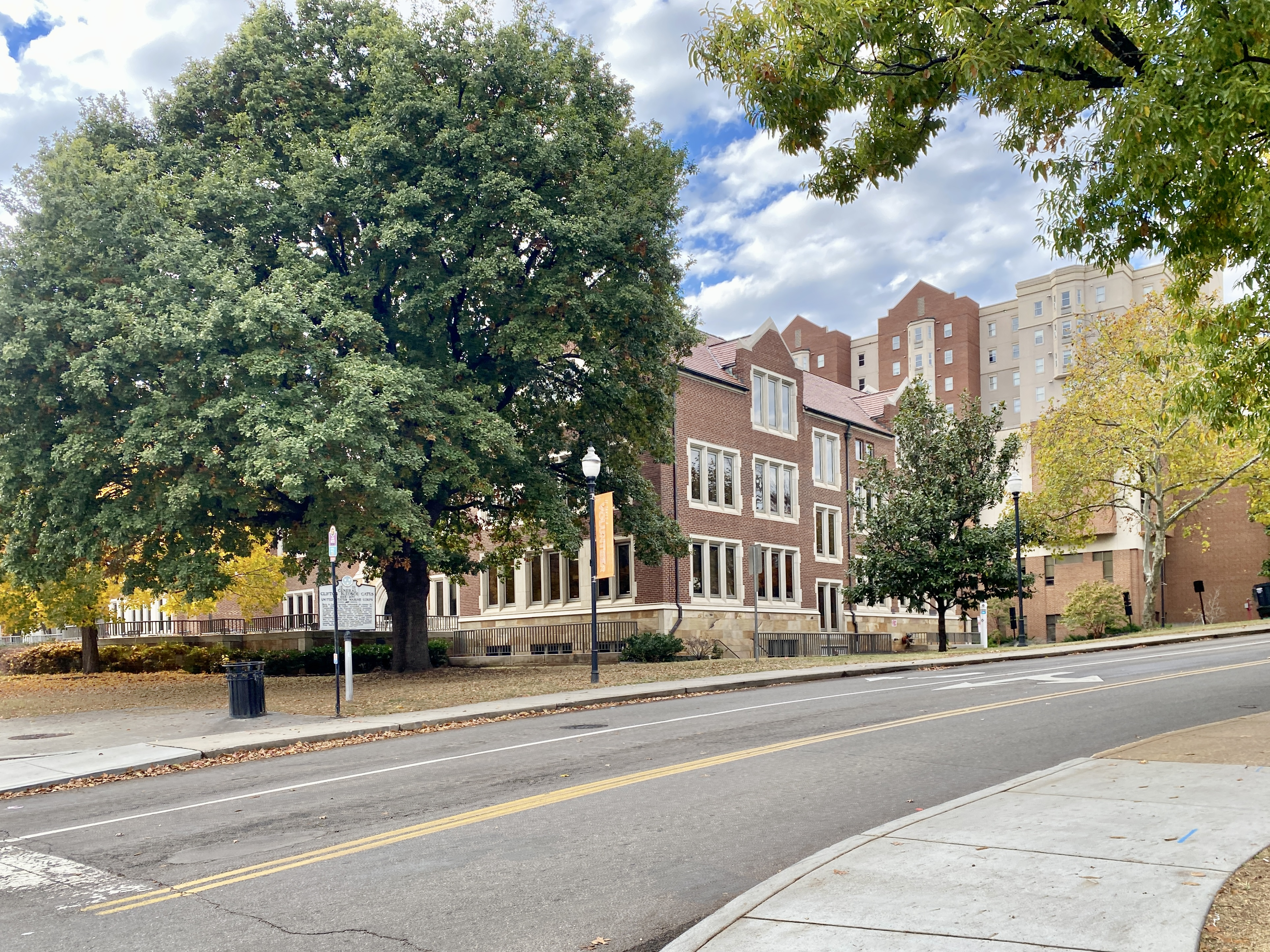
University of Tennessee College of Law

=== University of Tennessee College of Law ===
In 2000, White began teaching as an associate professor of law at the University of Tennessee College of Law until 2007. Her areas of expertise span across advocacy, criminal law, judicial ethics, legal ethics, capital punishment, state courts, procedure, and judicial selection. White taught classes in evidence, negotiations, interviewing and counseling, pretrial litigation, trial practice, professional responsibility, criminal pretrial litigation, and a seminar on the media's impact on justice. Professor White was the Elvin E. Overton Distinguished Professor of Law at the University of Tennessee College of Law until her retirement. She was also the director of the Center of Advocacy and Dispute Resolution. White emphasizes to her students that the law is about connecting with people. White started and directed the judicial externship program at the University of Tennessee College of Law that attempts to place students in Tennessee state courts and appellate courts in a judge's chambers. White retired in 2022 from teaching at the University of Tennessee.

== Political impact ==
After Penny White's defeat in the retention election she was described as a symbol for proponents of judicial independence, opponents of judicial elections, and advocates against the death penalty. Her removal from the judicial system politicized judicial elections. Just days after her removal, United States Supreme Court Justice John Paul Stevens stated that merit-based judicial selection systems, like the Tennessee Plan, will force judges to run on political platforms claiming to be tough on crime or in outright opposition to capital punishment. Stevens argued that political stances from judges establish evidence of judicial bias in promising to rule a certain way before a case. Merit-based judicial selection systems threaten judicial independence if there is excessive political influence and intervention. The executive director of the Death Penalty Information Center, Richard Dieter, references Penny J. White's case in saying when judges find mistakes in criminal trials and death penalty cases, the judge is not supposed to make a ruling based on popular opinion but whether due process and the law was followed. After losing the retention election, other judges have confided in White that they avoid ruling in certain ways before retention elections to avoid a "Penny White episode". Penny J. White is frequently referenced in the media and academic circles for her expertise in judicial ethics, judicial selection, legal ethics, state courts, judicial independence, advocacy, and capital punishment. In The Tennessean, White said that, "a judge is a judge 24/7" regarding a judicial ethics case of suspending a judge over sexual assault allegations and opioid use. In 2007, Penny J. White gave the keynote address at the National Conference for the National Association of Women Judges. She was invited by the National Association of Women Judges at give the address while a professor at the University of Tennessee School of Law and while she was serving as the Interim Director at the university's Center for Advocacy. Her address, titled "We the People", discussed the hardship of her retention election and the historical exclusion of women and people of color from the legal landscape in the United States. White has written opinion pieces in The Tennessean about the fairness of chancery court systems. She has also been outspoken in her academic work and the media about the impact of retention elections on judicial independence.

== Recognition ==
- University of Tennessee, SEC Faculty Achievement Award (2019–2020)
- Harold C. Warner Outstanding Teaching Award, University of Tennessee College of Law (2018)
- Governors' Award, Knoxville Bar Association (2017) which is the highest award given by the Knoxville Bar Association Board of Governors
- Bass, Berry & Sims Faculty Award, University of Tennessee College of Law (2016)
- Advancement of Justice Award, National Judicial College (2014)
- University of Tennessee Jefferson Prize (2012)
- University of Tennessee National Alumni Association Outstanding Teacher Award (2012)
- 2012 Dicta Award for best published article, Knoxville Bar Association
- Harold C. Warner Outstanding Teaching Award, University of Tennessee College of Law (2010)
- V. Robert Payant Award for Teaching Excellence, National Judicial College (2010)
- Marilyn V. Yarborough Award for Writing Excellence, University of Tennessee College of Law (2009)
- Carden Award for Outstanding Achievement in Scholarship, University of Tennessee College of Law (2008)
- Carden Award for Outstanding Service to the Institution, University of Tennessee College of Law (2007)
- Bass, Berry & Sims Award for Outstanding Service to the Bench and Bar, University of Tennessee College of Law (2006)
- Forrest W. Lacey Award for Outstanding Contribution to the University of Tennessee College of Law Moot Court Program, 2013–2014; 2005–2006; 2002–2003; 2001-2002
- Bernstein-Richie Award for Extraordinary Service to University of Tennessee Legal Clinic, 2002
- American Civil Liberties Union, Bill of Rights Award, 1997
- Association of Women Attorneys, Marion Griffin Award, 1996
- YWCA, Tribute to Women Award, 1996

== Published works ==
=== Law Review articles ===
- The New Due Process: Fairness in a Fee-Driven State, 88 Tenn. L. Rev. 1025 (2022)
- And Then There Were Yellow Roses, UTK Law Faculty Publications (Spring 2019)
- The Other Costs of Judicial Elections, 67 DePaul L. Rev. 369 (Winter 2018)
- If It "Aint" Broke, Break It: How the Tennessee General Assembly Dismantled and Destroyed Tennessee's Unique Judicial System, 10 Tenn. J. Law & Policy 329 (2015)
- A New Perspective on Judicial Disqualification: An Antidote to the Effects of the Decisions in White and Citizens United, 46 Ind. L. Rev. 103 (2013)
- Relinquished Responsibilities, 123 Harvard L. Rev. 120 (2009)
- Treated Differently in Life but not in Death: The Execution of the Mentally Retarded After Atkins v. Virginia, 76 Tenn. L. Rev. 685 (2009)
- Using Judicial Performance Evaluations to Supplement Inappropriate Voter Cues and Enhance Judicial Legitimacy, 74 U. Mo. L. Rev. 635 (2009)
- The Appeal to the Masses, 86 U. Denver L. Rev. 251 (2008)
- A Response to Professor Fitzpatrick: The Rest of the Story, 75 Tenn. L. Rev. 501 (Spring 2008)
- The Aftermath of Republican Party of Minnesota v. White, Pound Foundation (Summer 2007)
- "He Said, She Said," and Matters of Life and Death, 19 Regents U. L. Rev. 387(Fall 2006)
- A Matter of Perspective, 3 University of North Carolina First Amendment L. Rev. 5 (Winter 2004)
- Some Appeasement for Professor Tushnet, 71 Tenn. L. Rev. 275 (Winter 2004)
- "The Good, The Bad, and The (very, very) Ugly" (and its postscript, "A Fistful of Dollars"): Musings on White, 38 U. Richmond L. Rev. 626 (March 2004)
- Symposium: Preserving the Legacy: A Tribute to Chief Justice Harry L. Carrico, One Who Exalted Judicial Independence, 38 U. Rich. L. Rev. 615 (March 2004)
- Legal, Political, and Ethical Dilemmas to Applying International Human Rights Laws in State Courts, 71 U. Cinn. L. Rev. 937 (Spring 2003)
- Mourning and Celebrating on Gideon's Fortieth, 72 U. Missouri-Kansas City L. Rev. 515 (Winter 2003) Rescuing Confrontation, 54 S.C. L. Rev. 537 (Spring 2003)
- Judging Judges: Securing Judicial Independence By Use of Judicial Performance Evaluations, 24 Fordham Urban Law Journal 1053 (February 2002)
- Errors and Ethics: Dilemmas in Death, 29 Hofstra L. Rev. 1265 (Summer 2001)
- A Response and Retort, 33 Conn. L. Rev. 899 (Spring 2001)
- Newly Available, Not Newly Discovered, 2 J. of App. Prac. and Proc. 7 (Winter 2000)
- Can Lightning Strike Twice? Obligations of State Courts After Pulley v. Harris, 70 Col. L. Rev. 813 (Summer 1999)
- Master, Justice, Chancellor Kent: His Legacy For Today's Judges, 74 Chi-Kent L. Rev (1999)
- If Justice Is For All, Who Are Its Constituents?, 64 Tenn. L. Rev. 259 (1997)
- "It's a Wonderful Life," or Is It? America Without Judicial Independence, 27 U. Mem. L. Rev. 1 (1996), partial reprint in 80 Judicature 174 (Jan. - Feb. 1997)
- Yesterday's Vision, Tomorrow's Challenge: Alternative Dispute Resolution in Tennessee, 26 U. Mem. L. Rev. 957 (1996)
- A Survey of Tennessee Supreme Court Death Penalty Cases in the 1990s, 61 Tenn. L. Rev. 733 (1994)
- A Noble Idea Whose Time Has Come, 18 Mem. State L. Rev. 223 (1988) (master's thesis)

=== Books ===
- Tennessee Capital Case Handbook (Tennessee Association of Criminal Defense Lawyers) (rev'd. edition 2014)
- Tennessee Capital Case Handbook (Tennessee Association of Criminal Defense Lawyers) (2010)

==== Chapters in books ====
- Introduction to Gideon v. Wainwright, in Readings in Persuasion: Briefs that Changed the World (2012)
- Tennessee's New Abolitionists, Chapter 6, Judicial Independence and the Death Penalty (University of Tennessee Press) (2010)
- Presiding Over a Capital Case: A Benchbook for Judges, Chapter 1, Capital Cases and Federal Constitutional Issues; Chapter 10, Federal Habeas Corpus (William J. Brunson, et al., eds., National Judicial College) (2009)
- Introduction to Capital Litigation: Overview and History of Capital Jurisprudence in the United States Supreme Court, Chapter 1, Capital Litigation Improvement Initiative Benchbook for State Trial Judges (2009)
- Review of State Death Sentenced by Federal Courts: The Impact of Federal Habeas Corpus on State Death
- Penalty Cases, Chapter 10, Capital Litigation Improvement Initiative Benchbook for State Trial Judges (2009)
- Judicial Independence and Capital Punishment in Tennessee, Chapter 6, Tennessee's New Abolitionists: The Fight Against the Death Penalty in the Volunteer State (2009)
- Several Chapters in Encyclopedia of American Civil Liberties and Rights (Otis H. Stephens & John Scheb, eds.)(2006)
- The Improvement of the Administration of Justice, Chapter 33, The Continuing Evolution of the Federal Rules of Evidence (7th ed. 2001)
- Employee Rights From the Government Perspective: An Overview From the Practicing Attorney's Viewpoint, in Communicating Employee Responsibilities and Rights (Osigweh ed., 1987)

=== Publications for state court judges ===
- Tennessee's Municipal Court Judges Benchbook (2004–2006)
- Tennessee General Sessions Court Judges Benchbook (2002- 2005)
- Post-Conviction Manual for Trial Judges (National Judicial College, university ofNevada 2001) Tennessee Trial Judges Benchbook (2000)
- Sentencing Manual for State Court Judges, National Judicial College (1998–99)

== Personal life ==
Penny J. White met her husband, Mike Okun, while teaching at the University of North Carolina. Mike Okun has a focus on labor and employment law in his teaching at the university level. They travel together. White was very involved with taking care of her elderly parents until their deaths. White spends time outdoors in the mountains and on the lake, and with her nieces and nephews.
