= List of first women lawyers and judges in Tennessee =

This is a list of the first women lawyer(s) and judge(s) in Tennessee. It includes the year in which the women were admitted to practice law (in parentheses). Also included are women who achieved other distinctions such becoming the first in their state to graduate from law school or become a political figure.

== Firsts in Tennessee's history ==
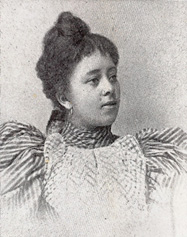
Lutie Lytle: First (African American) female lawyer in Tennessee (1897)

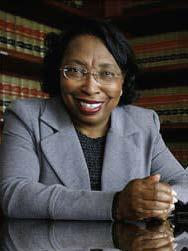
Bernice B. Donald: First African American female judge in Tennessee (1982)

=== Law School ===
- First (African American) female law graduate: Lutie Lytle in 1897

=== Lawyers ===
- First (African American) female: Lutie Lytle (1897)
- First female (actively practice): Marion Scudder Griffin (1907)
- First female to argue before the Tennessee Court of Civil Appeals: Frances Wolf (1907)

=== State judges ===
- First female: Camille Kelley in 1920
- First female (county judge): Kate M. Drake in 1931
- First female (probate court): Karen Webster
- First female (court of record): Martha Craig "Cissy" Daughtrey (1968) in 1975
- First female (Tennessee Court of Criminal Appeals): Martha Craig "Cissy" Daughtrey (1968) in 1975
- First female (state trial court): Julia Smith Gibbons in 1981
- First African American female: Bernice B. Donald (1979) in 1982
- First female (Chancery Court): Sharon Bell in 1986
- First female (Criminal Court of the First Judicial District): Lisa Niddifer Rice (1987)
- First female (Tennessee Supreme Court): Martha Craig "Cissy" Daughtrey (1968) in 1990
- First female (First Judicial Circuit): Penny J. White in 1990
- First African American female (city court): Earnestine Hunt Dorse in 1990
- First African American female (criminal court): Carolyn Wade Brackett in 1994
- First female (Tennessee Court of Appeals): Holly M. Kirby in 1995
- First African American female (circuit court): Rita L. Stotts in 2000
- First female (Chief Justice; Tennessee Supreme Court): Janice M. Holder in 2008
- First African American female (Tennessee Court of Criminal Appeals): Camille R. McMullen in 2008
- First openly bi-sexual female: Rachel Bell around 2017
- First Latino American female: Ana L. Escobar in 2018
- First African American (female) (Presiding Judge; Tennessee Court of Criminal Appeals): Camille R. McMullen in 2023

=== Federal judges ===
- First African American female (Court of Appeals for the Sixth Circuit; bankruptcy): Bernice B. Donald (1979) in 1988
- First female (United States District Court for the Western District of Tennessee): Diane Vescovo in 1995
- First female (United States District Court for the Middle District of Tennessee): Aleta Arthur Trauger in 1998
- First African American female (U.S. Court of Appeals for the Sixth Circuit): Bernice B. Donald (1979) in 2011
- First female (Presiding Judge; U.S. District Court for the Eastern District of Tennessee): Pamela L. Reeves (1979) in 2014

=== Deputy Attorney General ===
- First female: Patricia J. Cottrell (1976)

=== Assistant Attorney General ===
- First (African American) female: Etrula T. Trotter in 1974

=== United States Attorney ===
- First African American (female) (Western District of Tennessee): Veronica F. Coleman in 1993-2001
- First female (Eastern District of Tennessee): Nancy Harr

=== Assistant United States Attorney ===
- Martha Craig "Cissy" Daughtrey (1968): First female to serve as the Assistant U.S. Attorney for the Middle District of Tennessee (1968)
- Devon L. Gosnell: First female to serve as the Assistant U.S. Attorney for the Western District of Tennessee (1975)

=== Solicitor General ===
- Andrée Blumstein (1981): First female Solicitor General of Tennessee (2014)

=== Tennessee Bar Association ===
- First female (director/secretary): Billie Bethel
- First female president: Pamela L. Reeves (1979) from 1997-1998
- First African American (female) executive director: Joycelyn Stevenson

== Firsts in local history ==
- Susan Marttala: First female to serve as District Attorney in the State of Tennessee as well as for the Thirty-First Judicial District in Tennessee (1986) [Van Buren and Warren Counties, Tennessee]
- Tammy Harrington (1994): First female judge in Blount County, Tennessee
- Elizabeth Barger Ford: First female to practice law in Cocke County, Tennessee
- Hazel Horton Goldstein (1947): First female lawyer in Cocke County, Tennessee
- C. Vernette Grimes: First African American female to graduate from the Kent School of Law in Nashville (1939) [Davidson County, Tennessee]
- Martha Craig "Cissy" Daughtrey (1968): First female lawyer in Nashville's U.S. Attorney's Office. She is also the first tenure-track female professor at Vanderbilt Law School. [Davidson County, Tennessee]
- Andrei Ellen Lee: First African American female to serve as a Judge of the Davidson General Sessions Court (2004)
- Martesha Johnson: First African American (female) to serve as a Public Defender in Davidson County, Tennessee
- Stephanie Williams: First African American (female) to preside over a Davidson County Circuit Court (Family Division; 2024)
- Rachel Bell: First openly LGBT female judge in Nashville, Tennessee [Davidson County, Tennessee]
- Ana L. Escobar: First Latino American female elected as a Judge of the General Sessions Court (Davidson County) (2018)
- Angie Blackshear Dalton: First African American female judge elected in Nashville, Tennessee
- Kate M. Drake: First female judge in DeKalb County, Tennessee (1931)
- Joyce Ward: First female judge in Hamblen County, Tennessee (1978)
- Ardena Garth-Hicks: First African American female to serve as the Public Defender for Hamilton County, Tennessee
- Marguerite Lanham (1936): First female in Chattanooga, Tennessee admitted to the U.S. District Court (1939) [Hamilton County, Tennessee]
- Sherry Paty: First female to serve as a City Court Judge for Chattanooga, Tennessee (2004) [Hamilton County, Tennessee]
- Ophelia Dukes: First female magistrate in Hardeman County, Tennessee
- Lalla Block Arnstein: First female magistrate in Knox County, Tennessee (1924)
- Charme P. Allen: First female to serve as the District Attorney for Knox County, Tennessee (2014)
- Sue Shelton White: First female lawyer in Jackson, Madison County, Tennessee
- Dabney Anderson: First female magistrate of the Maury County Quarterly Court (1974)
- Nancy Smith Sellers (1950): First female lawyer in Murfreesboro, Rutherford County, Tennessee
- Donna Scott Davenport: First female judge in Rutherford County, Tennessee (2000)
- Camille Kelley: First female to serve as a Judge of the Juvenile Court of Memphis, Shelby County, Tennessee (1920)
- Alma Hogshead Law: First female magistrate in Shelby County, Tennessee (1929)
- Nell Sanders Aspero (1933): First female lawyer in Memphis, Shelby County, Tennessee
- Ann Pugh (1976): First female judge in Shelby County, Tennessee
- Camille McMullen: First female from Shelby County to serve as an intermediate appellate court judge
- Nancy B. Sorak: First female elected as a judge in Memphis, Shelby County, Tennessee. She was also the first female Public Defender for the City Court.
- Earnestine Hunt Dorse: First African American female to serve as a judge in Memphis, Tennessee (1990) [Shelby County, Tennessee]
- Carolyn Wade Blackett: First African American female to serve as a Judge of the Criminal Court in Shelby County, Tennessee (1994)
- Karen D. Webster: First African American (female) elected as a Judge of the Shelby County Probate Court (2006)
- Amy Weirich: First female to serve as the District Attorney for Shelby County, Tennessee (2011)
- Phyllis Aluko: First female (and African American female) Chief Public Defender of Shelby County, Tennessee (2019)
- Lee Ann Pafford Dobson: First female judge in Collierville, Tennessee (2019) [Shelby County, Tennessee]
- Kee Bryant-McCormick: First African American (female) judge in Sumner County, Tennessee (2022)
- Jane Franks: First female judge in Wilco, Williamson County, Tennessee

== See also ==
- List of first women lawyers and judges in the United States
- Timeline of women lawyers in the United States
- Women in law

== Other topics of interest ==
- List of first minority male lawyers and judges in the United States
- List of first minority male lawyers and judges in Tennessee
