= Dwight E. Tarwater =

American judge (born 1955)

Dwight Tarwater

Justice of the Tennessee Supreme Court
- Incumbent
- Assumed office September 1, 2023
- Appointed by: Bill Lee
- Preceded by: Sharon G. Lee

Personal details
- Born: Dwight Edward Tarwater; April 28, 1955 (age 70); Knoxville, Tennessee, U.S.
- Education: University of Tennessee (BA, JD)

Dwight Edward Tarwater (born April 28, 1955) is an American lawyer from Tennessee who has served as a justice of the Tennessee Supreme Court since September 2023.

== Early life and education ==
Tarwater was born on April 28, 1955, in Knoxville, Tennessee. He received a Bachelor of Arts from the University of Tennessee in 1977 and a Juris Doctor from the University of Tennessee College of Law in 1980.

== Career ==
Tarwater served as a law clerk to Judge Houston M. Goddard of the Tennessee Court of Appeals. From 1980 to 1984, he was an associate with Egerton, McFee, Armistead and Davis, he later became partner in 1984 and remained partner until 1987. He was a founding member of the firm Paine, Tarwater and Bickers in 1987. In 2014, Tarwater was asked to serve as general counsel to Governor Bill Haslam in his final term. Tarwater returned to his firm in 2019, and served until 2023 when he was appointed to the Tennessee Supreme Court.

=== Tennessee Supreme Court ===
In January 2023, Tarwater was one of three candidates suggested to the governor. On February 2, 2023, Governor Bill Lee nominated Tarwater to serve as a justice of the Tennessee Supreme Court to fill the vacancy left by the upcoming retirement of Justice Sharon G. Lee on August 31, 2023. On March 9, 2023, his nomination was confirmed by the Tennessee General Assembly. His term began on September 1, 2023.

Legal offices
Preceded by Sharon G. Lee	Justice of the Tennessee Supreme Court; 2023–present	Incumbent
