= Sharon G. Lee =

American judge (born 1953)

Chief Justice of the Tennessee Supreme Court
- In office September 1, 2014 – August 31, 2016
- Preceded by: Gary R. Wade
- Succeeded by: Jeffrey S. Bivins

Justice of the Tennessee Supreme Court
- In office October 2008 – August 31, 2023
- Appointed by: Phil Bredesen
- Preceded by: William M. Barker
- Succeeded by: Dwight E. Tarwater

Personal details
- Born: December 8, 1953 (age 72) Knoxville, Tennessee, U.S.
- Education: University of Tennessee (BS, JD)

Sharon Gail Lee (born December 8, 1953) is an American lawyer and jurist who served as a justice of the Tennessee Supreme Court from 2008 to 2023. She was appointed to the court by Governor Phil Bredesen. She was elected by state-wide vote in 2010, 2014, and 2022.

== Early life and education ==
Lee was born in Knoxville, Tennessee and raised in Madisonville. She graduated from Webb School of Knoxville in 1971. After attending Vanderbilt University, she earned a Bachelor of Science degree in business administration from the University of Tennessee in 1975. She continued her education at the University of Tennessee College of Law, graduating in 1978.

== Career ==
From 1978 to 2004, Lee worked in private practice as an attorney in Madisonville. During her time in private practice, she served as county attorney for Monroe County, Madisonville city judge, and city attorney for Vonore and Madisonville. She is a former Rule 31-listed family mediator.

Before becoming a Tennessee Supreme Court justice, she served on the Tennessee Court of Appeals for the Eastern Section. She was the first woman to serve on the Eastern Section of the Court of Appeals. She was appointed to that position on June 4, 2004. She was subsequently elected to the Court of Appeals in August 2004, then reelected for an eight-year term in August 2006.

She served as chief justice of the Tennessee Supreme Court from September 1, 2014, to August 31, 2016.

Lee retired from the court on August 31, 2023.

== Personal life ==
She has two children.

== See also ==
- List of female state supreme court justices
