= William M. Barker =

American judge (1941–2023)

William Muecke Barker

Chief Justice of the Tennessee Supreme Court
- In office 1995–2009
- Succeeded by: Janice M. Holder

Personal details
- Born: September 13, 1941 Chattanooga, Tennessee, U.S.
- Died: April 3, 2023 (aged 81)

William Muecke Barker (September 13, 1941 – April 3, 2023) was an American jurist. He was the chief justice of the Tennessee Supreme Court from 1995 to 2009.

== Early life and education ==
Barker was born on September 13, 1941, in Chattanooga, Tennessee. He graduated from the University of Chattanooga, now known as the University of Tennessee at Chattanooga, in 1964, with a degree in secondary education. While a student at Chattanooga, he became a member of the Delta Theta chapter of the Sigma Chi fraternity. In 1967, Barker earned his Juris Doctor from the University of Cincinnati College of Law.

== Career ==
After a brief enlistment with the United States Army Medical Corps, he entered private practice until 1983. That year Governor Lamar Alexander appointed him to the bench, and Barker eventually served on the Tennessee Supreme Court. He was elected chief justice by his peers on October 4, 2005. Barker, along with his fellow justices, was subject to a retention election in August 2006 under the provisions of the "Tennessee Plan" and was overwhelmingly reelected to an eight-year term. Barker retired in 2009 and was succeeded by Associate Justice Janice M. Holder. As of 2009, he served as of counsel for the firm of Chambliss, Bahner & Stophel in his hometown of Chattanooga.

== Personal life and death ==
Barker was married and had three children, and was a member of the First Presbyterian Church of Chattanooga. He was honored with "Distinguished Alumnus" awards from both his undergraduate alma mater and his law school, as well as being honored by his fraternity as a "Significant Sig" in 2006.

Barker died on April 3, 2023, at the age of 81.
