= Marion Griffin =

Marion Griffin may refer to:

- Marion Mahony Griffin, American architect and artist
- Marion Griffin (lawyer), American lawyer, the first woman to practice law in Tennessee
