= E. Riley Anderson =

American judge

Eric R. Komitee

Chief Justice of the Tennessee Supreme Court
- In office 1990–2006

Personal details
- Born: August 10, 1932 Chattanooga, Tennessee, U.S.
- Died: July 4, 2018 (aged 85)
- Education: University of Tennessee (LLB, JD)

Edward Riley Anderson (August 10, 1932 – July 4, 2018) was an American attorney, politician, and jurist who served as Chief Justice of the Tennessee Supreme Court from 1990 to 2006.

== Early life and education ==
Born in Chattanooga, Tennessee, Anderson a Bachelor of Laws and Juris Doctor from the University of Tennessee. He graduated from the Appellate Judges Program in 1988 and from the Advanced Appellate Judges Program in 1999 at New York University.

== Career ==
He practiced private law in Oak Ridge, Tennessee from 1958 to 1987. He was elected the charter commissioner of the city of Oak Ridge and served from 1962 to 1964. He was appointed to the Court of Appeals on March 2, 1987 and elected in August 1988.

In August 1990, Anderson became one of the last Tennessee Supreme Court members to enter office through an election, rather than being appointed by the governor and subject to a subsequent vote on retention. He was re-elected to the Supreme Court in August 1998. He served as chief justice of the Supreme Court from October 1994 to May 1996, from July 1997 to August 1998, and from September 1998 to August 2001.

During Anderson's time as Chief Justice, the Supreme Court passed a rule allowing the media to bring cameras into courtrooms. He worked on and wrote more than 3,000 appellate court decisions during his judicial career. On January 25, 2006, E. Riley Anderson announced that he would retire from the Supreme Court on August 31 of that year. However, when it became apparent that Governor of Tennessee Phil Bredesen and the judicial selection commission created under the Tennessee Plan were not going to be able to agree upon two nominees to replace Anderson and fellow retiring justice A. A. Birch Jr., Anderson agreed to continue his service on an interim basis until a successor could be named and qualified.

Anderson was also president of the Anderson County Bar Association, of the Tennessee Defense Lawyers Association, of the Tennessee Chapter of the American Board of Trial Advocates, and of the Hamilton Burnett American Inn of Court. He was also a member of the Board of Delegates of the Tennessee Bar Association. Between 1990 and 1995, he served as the chair of the Tennessee Judicial Council.

Anderson served as chair of the Select Senate/House Committee on Court Automation between 1990 and 1994. In 1998 and 1999 he was vice-chair of the Courts, Children and the Family Committee of the Conference of Chief Justices, an organization whose membership is composed of the highest judicial officers of U.S. states, the District of Columbia, and certain territories. In 1999 and 2000, he was on the Board of Directors of the Conference of Chief Justices.
