= Elinor Coonrod =

American lawyer

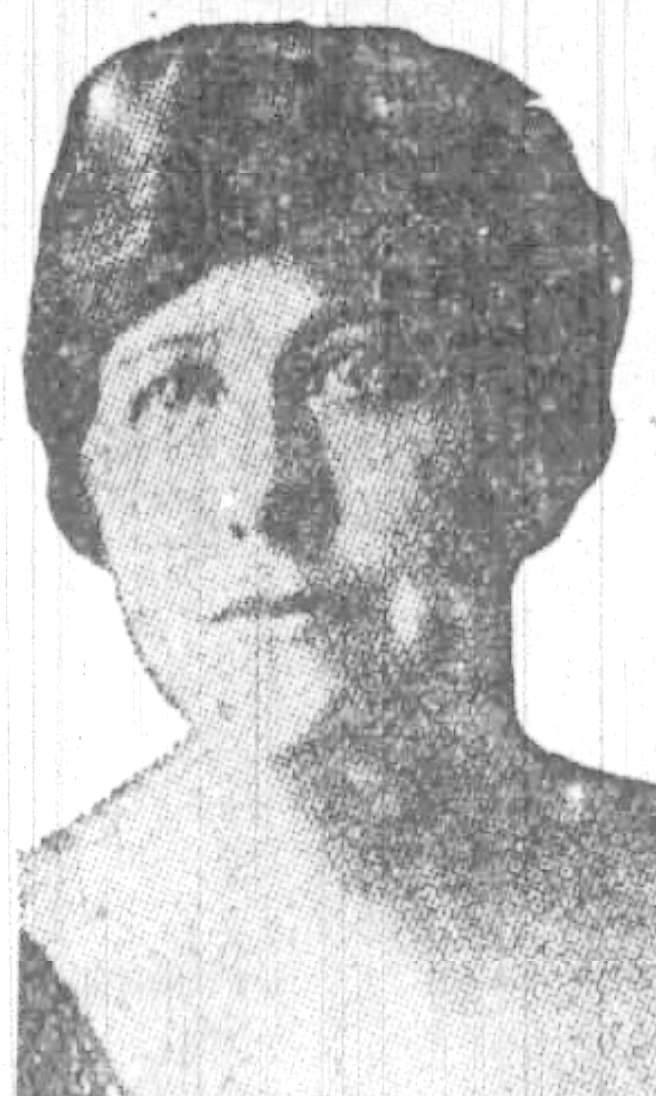
- Coonrod, from a 1922 newspaper
- Born: 1880s
- Died: February 12, 1929; New York, New York, U.S.
- Other name: Eleanor Coonrod
- Occupations: Lawyer, suffragist, clubwoman

Elinor Coonrod (1880s – February 12, 1929) was an American lawyer, clubwoman, and suffragist. She was secretary of the Chattanooga Equal Suffrage League, executive secretary of the National Federation of Business and Professional Women (BPW), and the first woman admitted to the Tennessee Bar Association.

== Early life and education ==
Coonrod was from Chattanooga, Tennessee, the daughter of S. A. Coonrod and Elizabeth Conway Coonrod. Her mother was a teacher, born in Ohio. She graduated from U.S. Grant University in 1907, and was the first woman admitted to the Tennessee bar, in 1909. She was later ejected from the Tennessee Bar Association when she failed to remit collected dues.

== Career ==
Coonrod was secretary of the Chatanooga Equal Suffrage League, first president of the Chattanooga Business Women's Club, and head of the legislation department of the Tennessee Federation of Women's Clubs. During World War I she was clerk of the Dade County, Georgia, draft exemption board. After the war, she held managerial and sales roles with companies in Chattanooga and Cleveland.

She moved to New York City in 1922, when she succeeded fellow lawyer Lena Madesin Phillips as executive secretary of the National Federation of Business and Professional Women. As BPW executive, she made a national lecture tour in 1924. She lectured on taxation to the Chattanooga BPW in 1926.

Coonrod died in 1929, in New York City.
