= Martha Craig Daughtrey =

American judge (born 1942)

Cissy Daughtrey
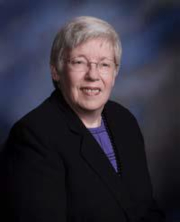

Senior Judge of the United States Court of Appeals for the Sixth Circuit
- Incumbent
- Assumed office January 1, 2009

Judge of the United States Court of Appeals for the Sixth Circuit
- In office November 22, 1993 – January 1, 2009
- Appointed by: Bill Clinton
- Preceded by: Seat established
- Succeeded by: Jane Branstetter Stranch

Associate Justice of the Tennessee Supreme Court
- In office April 1990 – November 22, 1993
- Appointed by: Ned McWherter
- Preceded by: William Fones

Personal details
- Born: Martha Craig Kerkow; June 22, 1942 (age 84) Covington, Kentucky, U.S.
- Education: Vanderbilt University (BA, JD)

Martha Craig "Cissy" Daughtrey (/ˈdɔːtri/; née Kerkow; born July 21, 1942) is a Senior United States circuit judge of the United States Court of Appeals for the Sixth Circuit.

== Early life and education ==
Daughtrey was born in Covington, Kentucky. Her father, Spencer Emil Kerkow, a Kentucky state amateur golf champion, died from an infection following wisdom teeth extraction when she was barely a year old. Her mother took her to live in Franklin, Kentucky. Her mother remarried in 1947 when Martha was about five years old. Daughtrey received a Bachelor of Arts degree from Vanderbilt University in 1964, and a Juris Doctor from Vanderbilt University Law School in 1968.

== Career ==
She was briefly in private practice in Nashville, Tennessee, in 1968, then became an Assistant United States Attorney for the Middle District of Tennessee, stationed in Nashville, from 1968 to 1969. She was an assistant district attorney for the Tenth Judicial Circuit of Tennessee, also in Nashville, from 1969 to 1972. She was a member of the faculty of the Vanderbilt University Law School, as an assistant professor of law from 1972 to 1975 and as a lecturer in law from 1975 to 1982, returning as an adjunct professor from 1988 to 1990. She was an Associate Judge of the Tennessee Court of Criminal Appeals, Middle Division from 1975 to 1990, becoming an associate justice of the Tennessee Supreme Court. She was the first woman to serve on this court, from 1990 until her appointment to the federal bench in 1993.

== Federal judicial service ==
On August 6, 1993, Daughtrey was nominated by President Bill Clinton to a new seat on the United States Court of Appeals for the Sixth Circuit, created by 104 Stat. 5089. She was confirmed by the United States Senate on November 20, 1993, and received her commission on November 22, 1993. She assumed senior status on January 1, 2009.

== Notable case ==
On November 6, 2014, the Sixth Circuit Court of Appeals ruled in DeBoer v. Snyder, upholding same-sex marriage bans in four states in which Daughtrey dissented. This ran counter to rulings by the United States Courts of Appeals for the 4th, 7th, 9th and 10th circuits.

Daughtrey wrote:

Because the correct result is so obvious, one is tempted to speculate that the majority has purposefully taken the contrary position to create the circuit split regarding the legality of same-sex marriage that could prompt a grant of certiorari by the Supreme Court and an end to the uncertainty of status and the interstate chaos that the current discrepancy in state laws threatens.

The United States Supreme Court later granted writ of certiorari to the case to review same-sex marriage bans when it previously declined to do so.

== Personal life ==
She is married to Larry Daughtrey, a journalist, and is a lifelong Democrat. Her daughter, S. Carran Daughtrey (b. 1964), her only child, is an Assistant United States Attorney, appearing in the United States District Court for the Middle District of Tennessee (one of the subordinate courts to the Sixth Circuit) and currently teaches at Vanderbilt University Law School.

== See also ==
- List of female state supreme court justices
- List of first women lawyers and judges in Tennessee

== Notes ==
Legal offices
New seat	Judge of the United States Court of Appeals for the Sixth Circuit; 1993–2009	Succeeded by Jane Branstetter Stranch
