= Camille McMullen =

American judge

Judge of the Tennessee Court of Criminal Appeals
- Incumbent
- Assumed office June 9, 2008
- Appointed by: Phil Bredesen

Personal details
- Born: Camille Reese; 1970 or 1971 (age 55–56)
- Education: Austin Peay State University (BS); University of Tennessee (JD)

Camille McMullen (born 1970 or 1971) is an American state court judge who serves as a judge of the Tennessee Court of Criminal Appeals.

== Education ==
McMullen earned her Bachelor of Science in political science at Austin Peay State University in 1993 and her Juris Doctor from the University of Tennessee College of Law in 1996.

== Career ==
In 1994, McMullen worked for the Tennessee Valley Authority. She was a legislative assistant for the Parliament of South Africa in Cape Town in 1995. McMullen was a law clerk for Judge Joe G. Riley of the Tennessee Court of Criminal Appeals from 1996 to 1997. From 1997 to 2001, she was an assistant district attorney general for the Shelby County District Attorney General's Office and from 2001 to 2008, she was an assistant United States attorney with the United States Attorney's Office for the Western District of Tennessee.

McMullen was appointed by Tennessee Governor Phil Bredesen to be a judge on the Court of Criminal Appeals on June 9, 2008, becoming the first African American woman to serve on an intermediate court in Tennessee.

McMullen was recommended by Senators Marsha Blackburn and Bill Hagerty for a position on the United States Court of Appeals for the Sixth Circuit, to fill the vacancy left by Judge Bernice B. Donald who would assume senior status upon confirmation of a successor. President Joe Biden chose Andre Mathis to fill the vacancy.

On June 27, 2023, McMullen was chosen to be the Presiding Judge of the Tennessee Court Of Criminal Appeals.

== Personal life ==
McMullen is married to Bruce McMullen and they have two children. In 2002, McMullen received recognition for her work in Project Neighborhood.

== See also ==
- List of African-American jurists
- Joe Biden judicial appointment controversies
