= Lutie Lytle =

American lawyer

Lutie A. Lytle
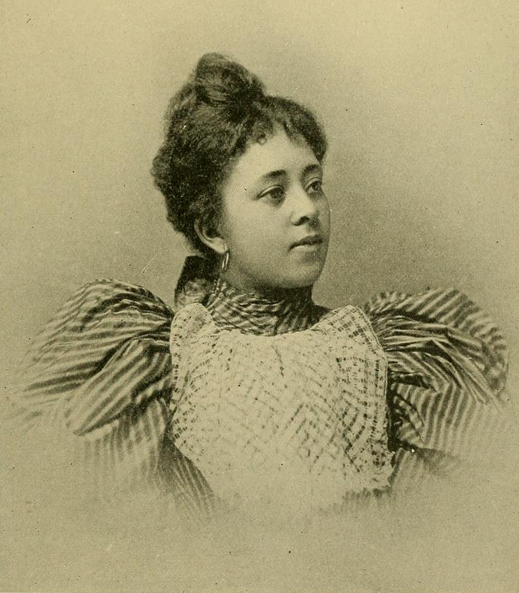
- Born: November 19, 1875; Murfreesboro, Tennessee
- Died: November 12, 1955 (aged 79)
- Occupation: Lawyer
- Known for: One of the first African-American female lawyers

Lutie A. Lytle (November 19, 1875 - November 12, 1955) was an African-American lawyer who was one of the first African-American women in the legal profession. Having been admitted to the state bar of Tennessee in 1897, she also practiced law in Topeka, Kansas, and Brooklyn, New York. In 1898, she joined the faculty of the law school of her alma mater, Central Tennessee College of Law becoming the first woman to teach law in a chartered law school.

== Early life ==
Lutie A. Lytle was born in Murfreesboro, Tennessee, one of six surviving children of John R. and Mary Ann "Mollie" (Chesebro) Lytle, both former slaves. In 1882, the Lytle family moved to Topeka, Kansas, most likely as a result of the mass migration of African-Americans from the South to the American West due to the Exoduster movement.

John Lytle worked in a number of jobs, but mostly as a barber, operating his own shop with the help of his son Charles Clayton Lytle. Both John and Charles Lytle also became active in local politics as members of the Populist Party; John Lytle at one time ran for the position of Topeka city jailor. Charles Lytle would become a Topeka policeman, rising to the rank of Chief of Detectives. He later served as a field deputy in the Kansas State Fire Marshal's Office and as a Deputy Sheriff of Shawnee County, Kansas, as well as owning a drug store in Topeka.

== Education and admission to the Bar ==
Lutie Lytle attended local Topeka schools and graduated from Topeka High School, where she was described as an "apt pupil." A contemporary account states that John Lytle, "an ardent worker in politics," while not asking for any favors for himself, "began to direct his influence toward obtaining something good for her." When the Populist Party swept into power in Kansas in 1891, sixteen-year-old Lutie Lytle was appointed assistant enrolling clerk for the Kansas Populist-controlled legislature, a "position she filled with eminent satisfaction to all concerned."

While working in the legislature, as well as contributing articles to the local African-American newspaper and working as a compositor in the newspaper's printing plant, Lutie Lytle began to dream of higher goals. As she said later, "I read the newspaper exchanges a great deal and became impressed with the knowledge of the fact that my own people especially were the victims of legal ignorance. I resolved to fathom its depths and penetrate its mysteries and intricacies in hopes of being a benefit to my people."

Saving a portion of her earnings, Lutie went to Chattanooga, Tennessee, where she taught school. She subsequently enrolled at the "law course" of Central Tennessee College in Nashville, Tennessee, where, in 1897, she graduated as valedictorian. "Besides the certificate of graduation the young woman was furnished with a diploma licensing her to practice before any of the courts in Tennessee." Lutie Lytle was able to secure a required certification of "good moral character" and her name was "enrolled on the minutes of... the Criminal Court [of Nashville].". Upon her admission, Lytle became the first female admitted to the Tennessee State Bar.

In September 1897, Lutie returned to Topeka where she became the first African American woman admitted to practice law in the state of Kansas. Although contemporary reports describe Lutie Lytle as being the first black woman lawyer in the United States, it appears that she was probably the third, being preceded by Charlotte E. Ray and Mary Ann Shadd Cary. However, at the time of Lytle's admission to the Tennessee and Kansas state bars, Ray had left the practice of law and Shadd Cary had died. However, it is probably accurate that, as her local paper reported, that she was "the first colored woman appointed to the bar in the West."

== Teaching law ==
After returning home to Topeka, it had been Lutie Lytle's intention to "commence practicing right away, but I found that a rest was what I needed." In 1898, she returned to Central Tennessee College as a member of the law school faculty and a librarian. The press claimed she was the first woman law professor in the United States, but others have noted Lytle began teaching at the same time as the female founders of the Washington College of Law. She stayed for one session through the spring of 1899. Since Lytle entered the educational field rather than practice law while in Tennessee, Marion Griffin was credited as the state's first female lawyer in 1907.

== First marriage and move to New York City ==
After leaving Nashville, Lutie Lytle returned to Kansas, where she travelled about "delivering lectures on "Marriage and Divorce." In 1900, Lutie Lytle was teaching school in Pittsburgh, Pennsylvania. The next year, on January 2, 1901, in Pittsburgh, she married Alfred C. Cowan, an African-American lawyer with offices at 220 Broadway in New York City. Cowan, a graduate of Boston University and New York Law School had been admitted to the New York state bar in 1892 and had an extensive general practice in the five boroughs of New York City.

Lutie Lytle-Cowan was admitted to the New York state bar and joined her husband's practice. Although his office was in Manhattan, the couple lived in a two story brownstone at 16 Downing Street in Brooklyn, New York. There were no children. Alfred Cowan was active in political, social and cultural circles, and his wife, who was described in the local press as "the only colored lady lawyer in New York," was just as active. She gave talks before women's groups and church congregations, as well as participating in programs designed to help the plight of black women in America, including the National Association of Colored Women. She also entertained many distinguished members of the African American professional, religious and intellectual communities, and their attendance was duly recorded in the black press.

As an example, in 1911, the editor of a "small colored [news]paper" ill-advisedly editorialized that "the colored women of New York City were mainly responsible for the immoral conditions of the city." Lutie Lytle-Cowan, the president of the Women's Civic Alliance "led the protest against the uncalled attack on the womanhood of the city." After the editor attempted to defend himself and his writings, "... Mrs. Cowan expressed a desire that he remain until he had heard a few words on the subject by some of the women present. Mrs. Cowan declared that while it was true that some women conducted buffet flats [another name for houses of ill repute] it was also true that such places were opened and maintained at the behest and patronage of men; that when women stood on street corners and talked with members of the male sex it was done at the instance of men, and that men were usually responsible for the moral status of women. It was suggested that the men of the city set a higher standard for the men to go by and not work to drag them down, thereby improving conditions."

While in New York she also worked for suffrage activists.

She and her husband often attended the annual convention of what is now the National Bar Association, the professional organization for African American attorneys. Lytle was the first black woman to become a member of the Association and she and her husband were the first married couple to participate as attorneys in the organization. After his sudden death in September 1913, she took over his practice and continued as a sole practitioner for some time.

== Second marriage and later career ==
On July 10, 1916, Lutie Lytle-Cowan married the Reverend Stephen Alexander McNeill, a minister in the African Methodist Episcopal Zion Church. She appears to have given up practicing law upon her second marriage. Reverend McNeill, a native of Robeson County, North Carolina, and a graduate of Ohio Wesleyan University and the divinity school of Boston University, served churches in Port Chester, New York, Harrisburg, Pennsylvania (Wesley Union AME Zion Church) and New Paltz, New York, and was named presiding elder of the Hudson River district of the AMEZ church in 1927. He died March 26, 1934, in Peekskill, New York, almost immediately after delivering a sermon.

After the death of Reverend McNeill, his widow returned to Brooklyn, New York, and again referred to herself as Lutie Lytle-Cowan. She was involved in local politics, being affiliated with the Democratic Party and an active member of the Regular Colored Democratic Association of Kings County, a political faction within the local Democratic machine. She continued her involvement in local cultural activities; in 1940, she was appointed to the Brooklyn Women's Advisory Committee of the New York World's Fair where she assisted in the planning of "Brooklyn Day" at the fair, held on May 21, 1940. During the summer, Lutie Cowan served on the "panel of hostesses" designated to represent the committee at the fair.

== Commemoration ==
A painting by Phyllis Garibay-Coon depicting her and other Kansas suffragists was unveiled at the Kansas Statehouse in January 2025. It is titled "Rebel Women" and is the first art installation by any woman artist to be in the Kansas Statehouse.

== See also ==
- List of first women lawyers and judges in Tennessee
