= Marion Griffin (lawyer) =

Lawyer in Tennessee

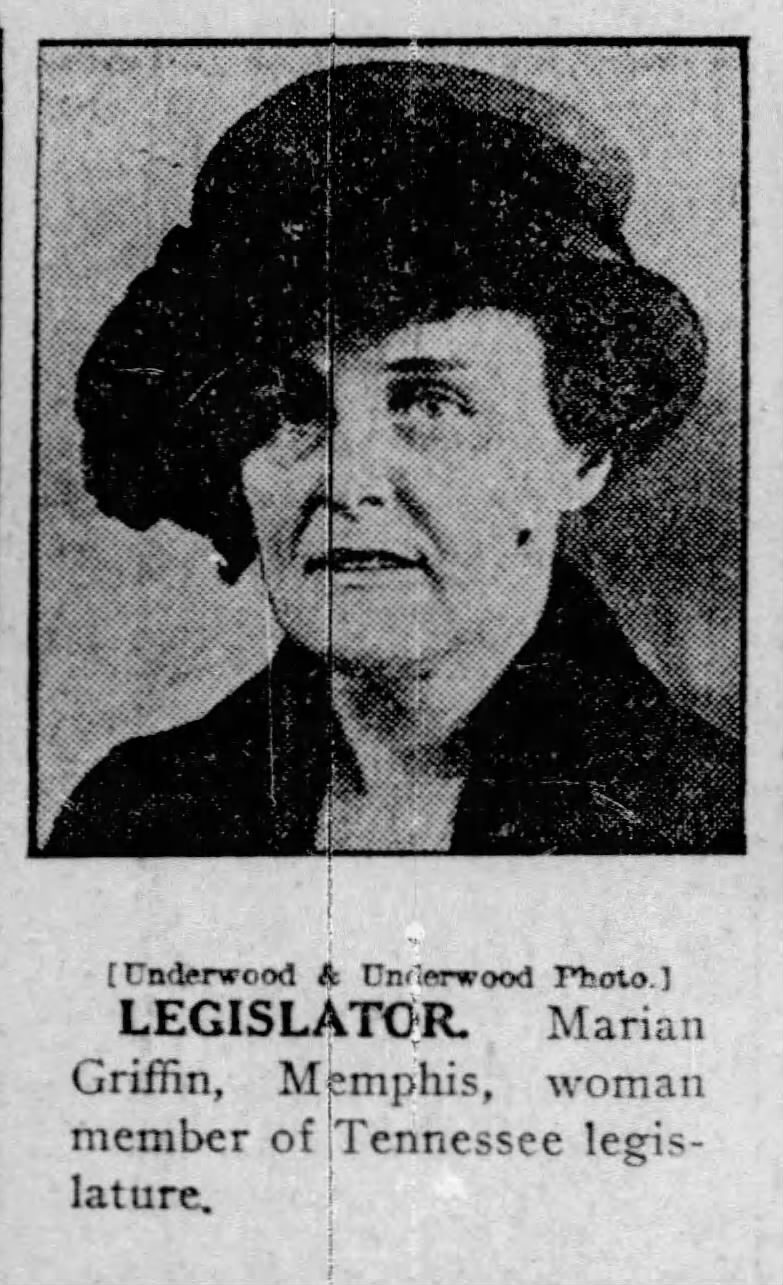
Marion Griffin, woman member of Tennessee legislature, 1923

Marion Scudder Griffin (1879 – January 30, 1957) was an American lawyer, and the first woman to practice law in Tennessee.

She was born in 1879 in Greensboro, Georgia. Griffin first worked as a stenographer in her hometown. Upon relocating to Memphis, Tennessee, Griffin began studying law while working as a stenographer for Judge Thomas M. Scruggs’ office.

Renowned African American female lawyer Lutie Lytle was the first female admitted to the Tennessee State Bar in 1897. Instead of actively practicing law, however, Lytle taught at Tennessee College's law department and served as a librarian before relocating to New York whereupon she developed a legal practice. In 1900, although Griffin was certified by Chancellor Dehaven and Circuit Court Judge Estes for admission to the Tennessee State Bar, she was denied entrance by Supreme Court of Tennessee on account of her sex.

Hence, Griffin decided to pursue a higher education, and completed her law degree by 1906 at the University of Michigan’s law school. The following year, Griffin was able to convince the Tennessee State Assembly to allow women to practice law. In July 1907, she became the first female lawyer in the state to actively practice law upon being licensed by the Tennessee Supreme Court and her local bar association. She set up a legal practice soon after at the Goodwyn Institute Building, and stayed active until her retirement in 1949. In 1923, she achieved another historical accomplishment by becoming the first female to hold a seat in the Tennessee House of Representatives.

Griffin died on January 30, 1957. Shelby County erected a historical marker in her honor.

== See also ==
- List of first women lawyers and judges in Tennessee
