= Gary R. Wade =

American judge

Gary R. Wade (born May 31, 1948) is a former Chief Justice of the Tennessee Supreme Court. Following retirement he was named vice president and Dean of Lincoln Memorial University's Duncan School of Law on July 28, 2015, taking the position on September 9, 2015.

== Education ==
Wade received his Bachelor of Science degree cum laude from the University of Tennessee in 1970 and his Juris Doctor from the University of Tennessee College of Law in 1973.

== Career ==
Wade was in private practice from 1973 to 1987. He served as the mayor of Sevierville from 1977 to 1987. Wade was appointed to the Tennessee Court of Criminal Appeals in 1987, and was elected 1988. He was re-elected in 1990, 1998 and 2006. Wade served as presiding judge of the court from 1998 to 2006.

Wade was appointed to the Tennessee supreme court on May 30, 2006, by Governor Phil Bredesen and took office on September 1, 2006. He was one of four justices on the five-justice court appointed by Bredesen. Wade served as chief justice on September 1, 2012, from to August 31, 2014.

Wade was retained by Tennessee's voters to a full eight-year term on the court in August 2008 and retained again in August 2014 to another eight-year term. Wade retired on September 8, 2015.

The state's Judicial Performance Evaluation Commission recommended Justice Wade be retained for another term in the August 7, 2014 retention election.

== Awards and recognition ==
- 2011: Scouts of America Great Smoky Mountain Council Good Scout Award
- 2010: Recipient of the Legacy Award from Friends of the Smokies
- 2009: Lincoln Memorial University Commencement, Keynote Speaker
- 2007–2008: Power100, Business TN
- 2007: Raymond L. Gardner Alumnus of the Year, Phi Delta Theta Fraternity
- 2007: United States Department of Interior Citizens Award for Exceptional Service
- 2006: East Tennessee Regional Leadership Award
- 2006: University of Tennessee College of Law Commencement, Keynote Speaker
- 2005, 2008: American Legion Boys State, Keynote Speaker
- 2005: Garden Club of America Conservation Award
- 2004: Appellate Judge of the Year, American Board of Trial Advocates
- 2004: Judicial Excellence Award, Knoxville Bar Association
- 2004: Citizen of the Year, Sevierville Chamber of Commerce
- 2004: Sevier County High School Wall of Fame
- 2001: Thornton Athletic Student Life Center Award, University of Tennessee
- 2000: Walters State Community College Commencement, Keynote Speaker
- 1999: Lions Club International Melvin Jones Fellow
- 1997–Present: United Way Leadership Society
- 1996: Pellissippi State Technical Community College Commencement, Keynote Speaker
- 1996: Superintendent's MVP – Great Smoky Mountains National Park
- 1987: Sevierville Chamber of Commerce Award
- 1987: Gary R. Wade Boulevard
- 1987: Key to City Award by City of Sevierville
- 1987: American Heart Association Presidential Award
- 1983, 84, 85, 97: Sevier County Mover and Shaker of the Year by The Mountain Press
- 1980: Outstanding Young Men of America, Who's Who in American Law

=== Associations ===
- Member, American Bar Association

- 1995-1996: Delegate

- Member, Tennessee Bar Association

- 1980-1988: House of Delegates
- 1995-1996: Board of Governors
- 2008-Present: Fellow, Young Lawyers Division

- Member, Knoxville Bar Association

- 2004 Board of Governors

- Member, Sevier County Bar Association
- 1988–Present: Member, American Inns of Court
- 2009–Present: Fellow, American Bar Foundation
- 2008–Present: Fellow, Knoxville Bar Foundation
- 2006–Present: Phi Delta Theta Educational Foundation
- 1998–Present: Tennessee Bar Association Fellow, Young Lawyers Division
- Walters State Community College Foundation

- 2005–2006: President
- 1998–Present: Board of Trustees

- 1996–Present: Founder and secretary, Tennessee Judicial Conference Foundation
- 1996–Present: Member, Tennessee Supreme Court Historical Society
- 1994–Present: Fellow, Tennessee Bar Foundation
- 1994–Present: Dean's Circle, University of Tennessee
- 1993–Present: Board of Visitors, University of Tennessee
- 1993–Present: Friends of the Great Smoky Mountains National Park, co-founder, past president, and president emeritus
- 1987–Present: Tennessee Judicial Conference; President, 1995–1996
- 1998–2006: Member, Council of Chief Judges
- 2004–2005: Member, Governor's Task Force on Sentencing
- 2003–2005: Maryville College Board of Trustees; Finance Committee, 2004–2005
- 1998–2005: UT Development Council
- 1997–2002: Pellissippi State Technical Community College, President's Associates
- 1990–1997: Eta South Province President, Phi Delta Theta Fraternity
- 1996: Member, Special Joint Committee (Senate Joint Resolution 477) on Special and Pro Tempore Judges
- 1995–1996: Tennessee Bar Association Board of Governors
- 1995–1996: Leadership Knoxville Class
- 1993–1996: Member, Commission on Future of the Tennessee Judicial System
- 1990–1994: Member, Tennessee Sentencing Commission
- 1980–1988: Tennessee Bar Association House of Delegates
- 1985–1987: Member, Tennessee Municipal Bond Fund, Board of Directors and Treasurer
- 1983–1987: Member, Tennessee Municipal Attorneys Association
- 1983–1987: Member, National Association of Municipal Law Officers
- 1973–1987: Member, Tennessee Trial Lawyers Association
- 1973–1984: Member, Tennessee Association of Criminal Defense Lawyers; Board of Directors, 1978–1984

=== Community Involvement ===
- 1972: Sevierville Lions Club, Past President
- 1972–1987: Sevier County Volunteer Legal Assistance Program
- 1977–1979: Sevierville Community Center Capital Campaign, Chair
- 1984, 1985, 1986: Sevier County Heart Association, Chairman
- 1984–1986, 2004–2006: Sevier County United Way, Board of Directors
- 1986–1987: East Tennessee Chapter of American Heart Association, Vice President
- 1989–1994: First United Methodist Church of Sevierville, Finance Chair
- 1996–2000: First United Methodist Church Conference, Finance Chair, Maryville District
- Friends of the Great Smoky Mountains National Park

- 1993–2005: Co-Founder and President
- 2005–2006: Board Chair
- 2007–Present: Chairman Emeritus

- 1996–2002: East Tennessee Foundation Board of Directors
- 1996: Honorary Chair, Boys & Girls Club of the Smoky Mountains Capital Campaign
- 1997–1998: Board of Directors, YMCA Metropolitan Knoxville
- 1997–2004: Board of Directors, AAA East Tennessee
- 1997: Board of Directors, United Way of Greater Knoxville Campaign Cabinet
- 1997–2008: Board of Directors, Tennessee's Resource Valley
- 1998–2000, 2006–Present: East Tennessee Historical Society Board of Directors
- 1998–Present: Sevier County High School Foundation Board of Directors
- Knoxville Zoological Gardens

- 2000–2006: Board of Directors
- 2002–2004: Vice Chair
- 2005–2006: Chair
- 2006–Present: Honorary Director

- 2000–2003: Board of Directors, Fort Sanders Foundation
- 2000–2002: Nine Counties, One Vision, chair, Transportation Committee
- 2001–2006: ALCOA Community Advisory Board
- 2002–2004: Knoxville Symphony Orchestra Board
- 2003–2005: Board of Directors, Friends of Headrick Chapel
- 2004–Present: Sevier County Library Foundation
- 2004–2006: Board of Directors, Museum of Appalachia, Vice Chair
- Leadership Sevier

- 1996: Co-Founder
- 1996–present: Board of Directors
- 2001: President
