= Sole practitioner =

Professional who practices independently

A sole practitioner or solo practitioner is a professional, such as a lawyer or an architect, who practices independently. For instance a sole practitioner's law firm may include non-lawyer support personnel but does not include any other lawyers.

== Law ==
=== United Kingdom ===
In UK, a sole practitioner usually refers to either;

- A solicitor or registered European lawyer who is regulated (in England and Wales) by the Solicitors Regulation Authority (SRA) to provide paid-for legal services to the public alone and unattached to a law firm or organisation, or
- a non SRA regulated lawyer who provides legal services alone outside of an organisation and is regulated by an authorised and legally recognised regulatory board or organisation.

SRA regulated sole practitioners do not include the following lawyers, who may also work alone or as a sole lawyer with an organisation:

- A regulated lawyer who works for a non-legal company or organisation, save for specific purposes under the SRA's regulations.
- Professional qualified and recognised barristers who are regulated by the Bar Standards Board.
- Lawyers who have achieved their professional qualification through the Chartered Institute of Legal Executives (CILEx).
- Lawyers who are may be qualified and permitted to practice a specific area of law by through a separate regulator, such as the Office of the Immigration Services Commissioner (for non-solicitor/barrister immigration lawyers) or insolvency practitioners, who are regulated by The Insolvency Service.

The above lawyers may also practice law and provide legal services alone subject to their specific regulators requirements, rules and any authorisation processes. For example, CILEx publish guidance and rules that apply to qualified Legal Executives who provide legal services alone.

A sole practitioner would most likely be a sole trader under UK law, meaning that the lawyer is self-employed and would run the business as an individual, paying income tax on profits.

As of 25 May 2016, solicitor sole practitioners are regulated under rule 10 of the SRA's handbook, which provides that subject to specific exceptions, regulated lawyers cannot set up their own law practice and provide legal services as a sole practitioner unless they have applied for and gained authorisation to do so from the SRA.

Authorised sole practitioner law practices, known as "recognised sole practices" are recognised and authorised separately by the SRA from regulated Partnership and Company legal service structures.

Sole practitioners in the U.K. are required to provide information on their website and on their engagement letters which clearly identifies who authorises and regulates their service, and their authorisation or professional identification number which can be checked with their regulator.

== Architecture ==
American Institute of Architects survey found that sole practitioners make up approximately 30% of their membership. The 2020 EntreArchitect Community survey showed 41% of respondents were sole practitioners.

Unlike architecturally educated employees in larger architectural firms, sole practitioner architects usually must hold current registration to practice architecture within their jurisdiction (indeed often to use the term architect itself).

Sole practitioner architects face many unique challenges in their professional environment, such as additional practice management, limited ability to work on larger projects, limited time to deliver projects, lower salary than large firm senior staff and limited opportunity for collaborative work. As result, many sole practitioner architects are members of variety of networking groups that enable professional networking, exchange of information, sharing of expertise and direct cooperation between members. Internationally sole practitioner architects are represented by the International Small Practice Architects Association.
