= Tennessee Court of Appeals =

Appellate court in Tennessee, US

- Established: 1925; 101 years ago
- Jurisdiction: Tennessee, United States
- Location: Knoxville, Nashville, and Jackson
- Composition method: Executive selection plus Non-partisan retention (Tennessee Plan)
- Authorized by: Tennessee General Assembly
- Appeals to: Tennessee Supreme Court
- Judge term length: 8 years; renewable
- Number of positions: 12
- Website: Official website

Chief Judge
- Currently: Frank G. Clement, Jr.

The Tennessee Court of Appeals (in case citation, Tenn. Ct. App.) was created in 1925 by the Tennessee General Assembly as an intermediate appellate court to hear appeals in civil cases from the Tennessee state trial courts. Appeals of judgments made by the Court of Appeals may be made to the Tennessee Supreme Court.

== Judges ==
The Court has twelve judges who sit on three-judge panels. The Court is further divided into three sections, each with four judges, based around Tennessee's Grand Divisions: the Eastern Section based in Knoxville, the Middle Section based in Nashville, and the Western Section based in Jackson.

Judges are chosen via the Tennessee Plan: they are first nominated by the Governor and then must be confirmed or disapproved by the General Assembly. If the General Assembly is in session at the time of the nomination, it must then vote within 60 days of the nomination; if it is not in session, it must vote within 60 days of the convening of the next session. If no vote is taken within 60 days, the nominee is considered to have been confirmed by default. After the judge is confirmed, they face a retention election after each eight-year term.

If a vacancy occurs between election cycles (for example, if a judge dies or retires), the 11-member Tennessee Governor's Council for Judicial Appointments interviews applicants and recommends three candidates to the Governor. The Governor then appoints a new judge to serve in the interim period until the next August general election.

The twelve judges sitting on the Court as of March 2026 are:

Section	Name	Start	Appointer	Law School	Succeeded
Eastern	Kristi Davis	August 3, 2020	Bill Lee (R)	Tennessee	Charles Susano
Eastern	Skip Frierson	February 14, 2013	Bill Haslam (R)	Tennessee	Herschel Franks
Eastern	John McClarty	January 27, 2009	Phil Bredesen (D)	Southern	Sharon Lee
Eastern	William Phillips	March 5, 2026	Bill Lee (R)	Memphis	Michael Swiney
Middle	Andy Bennett	September 28, 2007	Phil Bredesen (D)	Vanderbilt	William Koch
Middle	Frank Clement	October 1, 2003	Phil Bredesen (D)	Nashville	Ben Cantrell
Middle	Neal McBrayer	May 29, 2014	Bill Haslam (R)	William and Mary	Patricia Cottrell
Middle	Jeffrey Usman	September 1, 2022	Bill Lee (R)	Vanderbilt	Richard Dinkins
Western	Steven Maroney	March 5, 2026	Bill Lee (R)	Memphis	Kenny Armstrong
Western	Carma Dennis McGee	July 19, 2019	Bill Lee (R)	Memphis	Brandon Gibson
Western	Valerie Smith	March 24, 2025	Bill Lee (R)	Memphis	Arnold Goldin
Western	Steven Stafford	June 12, 2008	Phil Bredesen (D)	Samford	Frank Crawford

== See also ==
- Courts of Tennessee
- Tennessee Court of Criminal Appeals
- Tennessee Supreme Court
