= Nashville School of Law =

American law school

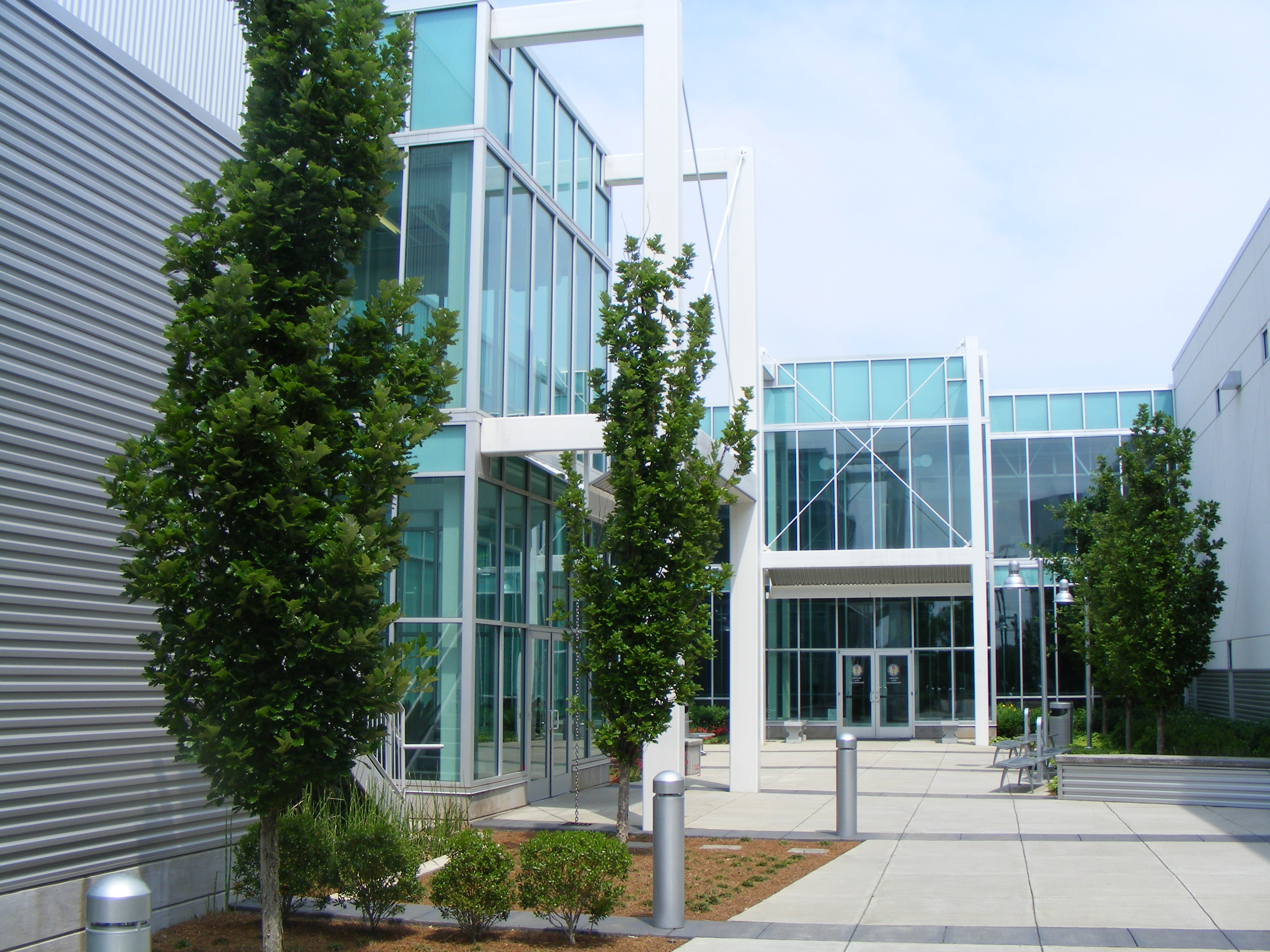
- Motto: Professionalism, Excellence, Civility
- Established: 1911
- School type: Private
- Location: Nashville, Tennessee, United States; 36.1035°N 86.7603°W
- Faculty: 55 Instructors consisting of local judges and attorneys
- Bar pass rate: 68.5% (July 2019 first time takers)
- Website: nsl.law

Nashville School of Law (formerly known as the Nashville YMCA Night Law School), is a private law school founded in 1911. The school's students attend classes at night on a part-time basis.

== History ==
In the fall of 1911, Morton B. Adams, William P. Cooper, Lee Douglas, and Robert Selph Henry, then recent graduates of Vanderbilt University Law School, opened night law classes at YMCA for the benefit of those unable to attend law classes during the day. The law school has been in continual operation since that time. It was incorporated under the laws of the State of Tennessee on January 19, 1927. Since that date, the law school has conferred the Juris Doctor or Doctor of Jurisprudence degree on over 2,970 graduates. Until November, 1986, the school operated as the Nashville YMCA Night Law School, leasing its classroom space from the Downtown YMCA. On November 24, 1986, the school officially changed its name to Nashville School of Law.

James Gilbert Lackey, Jr. (1915–1987) served as dean of the Law School and taught Contracts from 1946 to 1986. Upon his retirement, the faculty elected Judge Joe C. Loser, Jr., dean of the school. Judge Loser then retired from the Third Circuit Court of Davidson County, Tennessee after 20 years on the bench to become the fourth dean in the school's history on August 23, 1986. Following Loser's retirement, former Tennessee Supreme Court Justice and NSL faculty member, Justice William C. Koch, Jr. became the fifth dean of NSL in July 2014.

== Accreditation ==
Nashville School of Law is approved by the Tennessee Board of Law Examiners and graduates may take the bar examination and practice law in the State of Tennessee. The school is not, however, accredited by the American Bar Association. This limits the ability of graduates to practice law in states other than Tennessee. Graduates of NSL are not eligible to take the bar or practice law in 19 states, and may only take the bar or practice in a further 23 states if they have passed another state's bar exam.

== Academics ==
The 57 credit hours required for the J.D. degree require four years to complete, and several of the courses are designed to focus on practice in Tennessee. Classes are held each evening Monday to Thursday. Classes begin in August each fall and continue through early May. Classes are on Monday and Thursday nights first and second year, typically beginning at 6:30 p.m. and running until 10 p.m. Third- and fourth-year students add some classes on Wednesday nights.

All students must complete 57 credit hours with a GPA of at least 2.25 to graduate. The top ten percent of each graduating class is inducted into Cooper's Inn, the school honor society, and recognized at graduation. The student who graduates at the top of the class is awarded the Founder's Award and receives a set of the Tennessee Code Annotated.

=== Faculty ===
The school's faculty includes practicing lawyers and judges from across the state of Tennessee; formerly including the late former Tennessee Chief Justice Adolpho Birch, and now including former Justice William C. Koch, Jr. of the Tennessee Supreme Court, who became dean of the school in July 2014.

== Campus and library ==
In the Fall of 2005, the school moved into its current facility at 4013 Armory Oaks Drive. It had been nearby at 2934 Sidco Drive, since 1990.

The Nashville School of Law Library consists of 15,727 hard copy volumes. All students have access to LexisNexis and Westlaw research services in the library at the computer lab, from any location in the facility through a wireless-enabled laptop, and from any other location with Internet access.

== Admissions ==
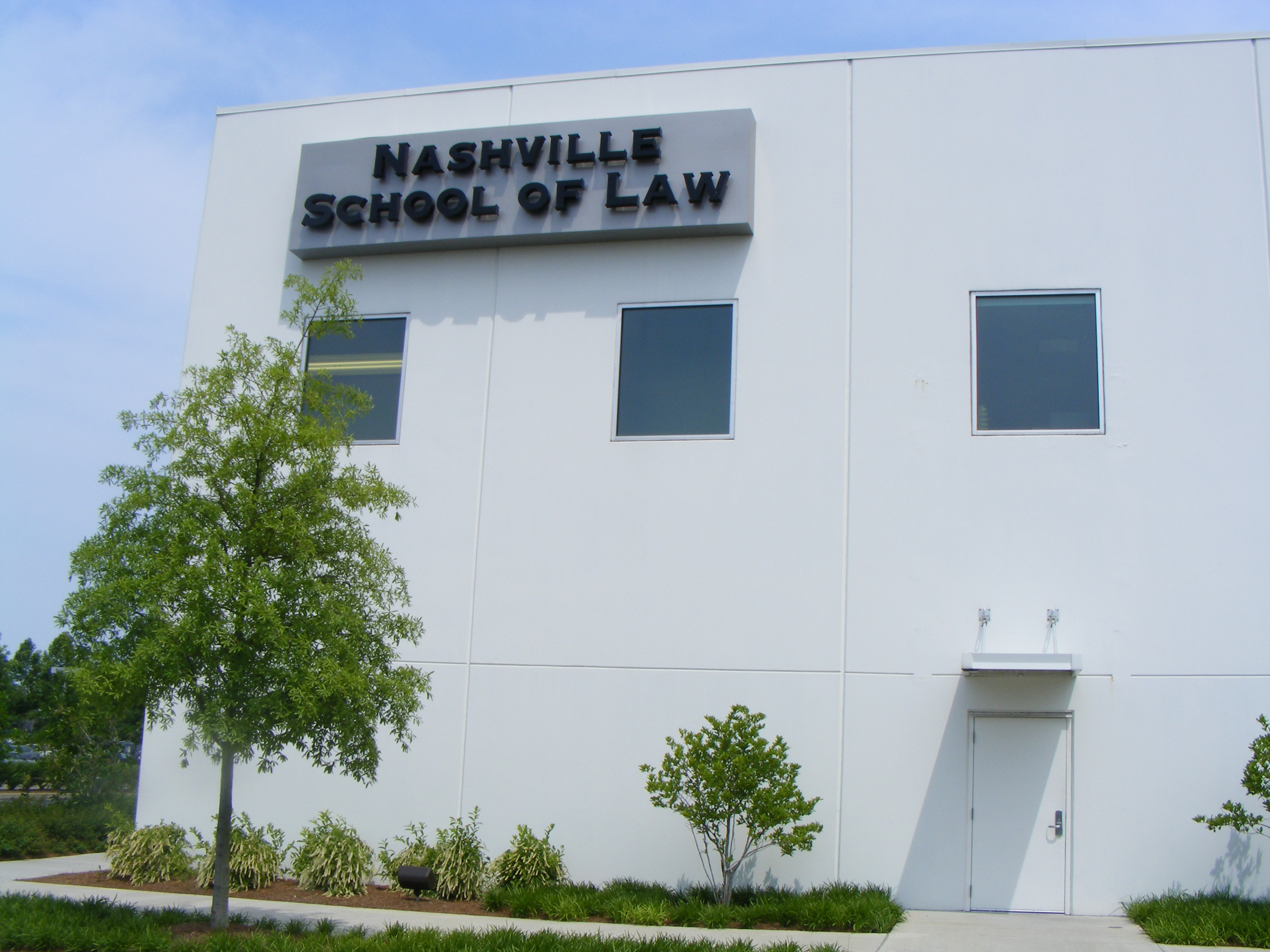
The Nashville School of Law

Nashville School of Law enters two terms each year, in February and August, and operates on a "rolling admissions" basis. Applications are processed at the time they are received. Applicants must have received, or will receive prior to matriculation, a bachelor's degree from a college or university on the approved list of the Southern Association of Schools and Colleges, or the equivalent regional accrediting association. The applicant must also submit three letters of recommendation, one of which must be from someone in the legal field, and should describe any extracurricular activities during their undergraduate career or business accomplishments since college graduation. Applicants must also include an explanation of any prior arrests and/or any disciplinary action received from an educational institution. Nashville School of Law maintains a strict anti-discrimination and anti-harassment policy, and provides assistance for disabled students.

The median LSAT score for students admitted in the 2018–2019 admissions cycle was 148 and the median GPA was 3.19.

== Costs and financial aid ==
For the 2019–20 school year, tuition is $7,420 (excluding books) for a typical first-year load of twelve credit hours. The total cost of the 57 credit hours needed to graduate is $35,890 (excluding books).

As a private institution, NSL does not participate in federal loan programs; students are not eligible for federal loans and must apply independently for loans through banks. The school offers a limited number of partial and full scholarships for students, based on need and merit.

== Bar passage rate and post-graduation employment ==
Nashville School of Law does not publish employment data for its recent graduates.

Nashville School of Law graduates who took the Tennessee bar exam for the first time in July 2023 had a pass rate of 78.36%, vs. a 67.18% pass rate for the state as a whole.

== Notable alumni ==
- Ross W. Dyer, Chief Justice of the Tennessee Supreme Court
- Johnny Garrett, attorney and member of the Tennessee House of Representatives
- Albert Gore Sr., former U.S. Senator and father of former U.S. Vice President Al Gore
- Jack Kershaw, attorney and sculptor who represented Martin Luther King Jr.'s assassin James Earl Ray and founded the League of the South
