= Tennessee Bar Association =

- Type: Legal Society
- Headquarters: Nashville, TN
- Location: United States
- Website: www.tba.org

The Tennessee Bar Association (TBA) is a voluntary bar association for the state of Tennessee.

== History ==
On December 14, 1881, 69 Tennessee lawyers signed the Charter of Incorporation establishing the Tennessee Bar Association. The first woman admitted to the Tennessee Bar Association was Elinor Coonrod, in 1909.
