= Tennessee Court of Criminal Appeals =

Appellate court in Tennessee, US

- Established: 1967
- Jurisdiction: Tennessee, United States
- Location: Knoxville, Nashville, and Jackson
- Composition method: Executive selection plus non-partisan retention (see Tennessee Plan)
- Authorized by: Tennessee General Assembly
- Appeals to: Tennessee Supreme Court
- Number of positions: 12 - panels of 3 justices
- Website: tncourts.gov/courts/court-criminal-appeals

The Court of Criminal Appeals is one of Tennessee's two intermediate appellate courts. It hears trial court appeals in felony and misdemeanor cases, as well as post-conviction petitions. Appeals in civil cases are heard by the Tennessee Court of Appeals.

The Court of Criminal Appeals was established by the Tennessee General Assembly in 1967. At that time, the court had nine members. Its membership was increased from nine to twelve on September 1, 1996, as a result of action by the General Assembly.

== Proceedings ==
The court's judges sit monthly in panels of three in Jackson, Knoxville and Nashville. The court may meet in other locations as necessary. As an appellate court, there are no juries and the court does not hear testimony from witnesses. Rather, attorneys present oral and written arguments for the court's consideration.

Decisions of the Court of Criminal Appeals decisions may be appealed to the Tennessee Supreme Court by permission. All decisions in capital cases are, however, appealed automatically.

== Judges ==
The judges are elected to eight-year terms. If a vacancy occurs during a judge's term, the governor appoints a new judge to serve until the next August of an even-numbered year, when a state general election is held. The names of incumbent judges up for reelection, including judges appointed to fill vacancies, are listed on the ballot without opposition. They are retained or rejected based on a "yes-no" vote. (See Tennessee Plan.)

The twelve judges sitting on the Court as of March 2025 are:

Section	Name	Start	Appointer	Law School
Middle	Jill Bartee Ayers	2021	Bill Lee (R)	Tennessee
Western	John Campbell	2022	Bill Lee (R)	Memphis
Western	Ross Dyer	2016	Bill Haslam (R)	Samford
Middle	Timothy Easter	2014	Bill Haslam (R)	Nashville
Eastern	Tom Greenholtz	2022	Bill Lee (R)	Tennessee
Eastern	Kyle Hixson	2022	Bill Lee (R)	Tennessee
Middle	Robert Holloway	2014	Bill Haslam (R)	Tennessee
Western	Camille McMullen	2008	Phil Bredesen (D)	Tennessee
Eastern	Robert Montgomery	2014	Bill Haslam (R)	Tennessee
Eastern	Steven Sword	2025	Bill Lee (R)	Tennessee
Middle	Robert Wedemeyer	2000	Don Sundquist (R)	Memphis
Western	Matthew Wilson	2023	Bill Lee (R)	Florida State
