= Tennessee Plan =

System used to appoint / elect court judges in Tennessee, US

The Tennessee Plan is a system used to appoint and elect appellate court judges in Tennessee. It is largely patterned after the Missouri Plan, and an earlier version in Tennessee was called the Modified Missouri Plan. At the end of every judge's eight-year term following a judicial appointment to the highest courts, retention elections are held, which have the option of whether each judge shall be retained through a yes-no option. This system applies to the Tennessee Supreme Court, the Tennessee Court of Appeals, and the Tennessee Court of Criminal Appeals.

In November 2014, a referendum on formally adopting the Tennessee Plan as an amendment to the Tennessee Constitution, clarifying its status, was held, and the plan's provisions were formally added to the Constitution. That constitutional amendment modified the previous statutory system in that the governor can now select his own nominees to the courts without the input from a commission, and that nominees must be confirmed or disapproved by the General Assembly, which must vote whether to do so within 60 days of the nominee's selection if it is in session, and within 60 days of the convening of the next session if it is not in session at the time of the appointment, and if no vote is taken within this deadline, the nominees are considered to have been confirmed by default.

== Process ==
Until the ratification of the constitutional amendment in 2014, when a vacancy occurred, the Judicial Nominating Commission accepted applications from any qualified Tennessee lawyer. Typical qualifications include age, residency, and proper professional standing. The commission then chose three nominees from the applications received. The commission submitted these three nominees—altogether called a panel—to the governor of Tennessee. Residency qualifications included not only state citizenship but also citizenship within a particular Grand Division.

If the governor rejected the entire panel, the commission had to submit another panel. When this occurred, the governor was compelled to choose a nominee from the second panel. No one who was on a rejected panel of nominees can be on the second panel. This process effectively guaranteed that one of six of the nominees chosen by the 17 members of the Nominating Commission must become a judge.

The Judicial Nominating Commission was composed of 17 unelected members, with explicit requirements that the majority be lawyers.

Once chosen by the governor, the judge took his/her seat. At the first statewide general election following his or her appointment, the person's name is placed before the public on the ballot on a simple yes-no basis, e.g., "Shall Jon R. Smith be elected and retained as Judge, Court of Criminal Appeals, for Middle Tennessee?" If a majority of voters decides this question in the negative, the process outlined above starts over.

Every eight years (1998, 2006, 2014, 2022, et seq.), all members of all of the state appellate courts are subjected to this process as well. All judges are elected statewide, not just in the Grand Division from which they are appointed.

In 2006, all judges submitted for approval received an affirmative vote of at least 70 percent.

Until its dissolution in 2014, the 12-member Judicial Performance Evaluation Commission reviewed the record of incumbent judges and published its findings approximately six weeks before the retention elections. This report gave the panel's rationale for its recommendations based on the public record of each of the judges and a public interview process in which potential areas for improvement were noted. The report summarized these findings and noted the vote by which judge was recommended (or, theoretically, not recommended) for retention, although not how each individual commissioner voted.

This report was published in the state's major metropolitan newspapers; the 2006 report appeared in Sunday papers as a special section. The 2006 report endorsed all of the incumbent judges seeking reelection, most unanimously and none by a margin of less than 8-3; one member appointed to the review panel at this time was unable to serve.

== History ==
The General Assembly adopted the Modified Missouri Plan in 1971 to apply to judges of the Supreme Court, Court of Appeals, and Court of Criminal Appeals.

Two years later, the Democratic majority in the Legislature was alarmed that Republican Governor Winfield Dunn was going to be able to appoint all five Supreme Court justices when their eight-year terms expired in 1974, meaning that they would subsequently face the voters as incumbents. The Legislature passed a bill to exempt the Supreme Court from the Modified Missouri Plan and return it to popular election, but it was vetoed by Governor Dunn.

At the same time, Republicans in upper East Tennessee were pressing hard to create a new medical school at East Tennessee State University (ETSU). Dunn, who was from Memphis, opposed the creation of a second state medical school that would compete for resources with the University of Tennessee Health Science Center (UT Health and Sciences Center), which was in Dunn's hometown. Dunn vetoed the bill, creating the medical school.

House Speaker Ned McWherter, D-Dresden, and Rep. Palma Robinson, R-Jonesborough, agreed to swap votes with McWherter providing some Democratic votes to override the medical school veto and Robinson providing some Republican votes to override the Supreme Court bill veto. The deal went down just as planned, creating what is now known as the James Quillen School of Medicine at ETSU, and removed the Supreme Court from the Modified Missouri Plan.

In 1978, a judiciary amendment proposed by a limited constitutional convention whthatad met the previous fall was defeated in a statewide special election at which only a series of proposed constitutional amendments were considered. It would have, among other provisions, largely formalized the adoption of the Modified Missouri Plan. The other amendments under consideration at the time were primarily of a technical nature, serving mostly to remove obsolete language, such as clauses forbidding interracial marriage and requiring public school segregation, which had long been rendered totally invalid by prior federal judicial decisions, and all were approved by large majorities. Only the judiciary amendment would have made a major, substantive change, and it was rejected by a large majority, which failed to provide any closure on the issue.

From 1974 until 1994, justices of the Supreme Court stood for partisan election, but they were nominated by the executive committees of their respective parties rather than in primary elections as was the case for other state officials standing for election. Reflecting the partisan balance of the state at the time, Democrats won every election for the Supreme Court in this time frame, often without Republican opposition.

The Modified Missouri Plan continued to apply to the two intermediate appellate courts. During the 20 years of the Modified Missouri Plan, no judges were removed from office by the voters.

In 1994, the Legislature overhauled the process to include the Supreme Court again, provide more evaluation of incumbent justices, and provide more information to voters in advance of retention elections. The Judicial Performance Evaluation Commission was created to review and rate the performance of individual judges and publish that information. This became known as the Tennessee Plan.

Under the Tennessee Plan, one judge (State Supreme Court Justice Penny White) was removed in 1996. She was highly rated by the Evaluation Commission, but her opinion in a death penalty case became controversial, and this was played up by those opposing her reconfirmation.

=== Opposing views ===
Criticism of the plan centers on the creation of a self-perpetuating system of selection in which the public at large is in effect shut out of meaningful decision-making. Some opponents asserted that the process violated the Tennessee State Constitution in that the yes-no balloting it calls for does not truly constitute an "election" in the sense intended by the document's framers. This question was adjudicated by a special Supreme Court in a case filed by political gadfly John Jay Hooker. The regular members of the Supreme Court recused themselves from the case as interested parties since they had been selected under the provisions in question. The special court found the process to be fully compliant with applicable provisions of the state constitution.)

However, the General Assembly chose to terminate the selection commission under provisions of the Tennessee Sunset Law, which causes the existence of most state agencies to end automatically after a specific period of years unless their continued existence is reauthorized. The Judicial Selection Commission was sunseted as of June 30, 2013; however, a new 17-member body consisting of many of the members of the former commission, but several new appointees, assists Governor Bill Haslam in appointing persons to judicial vacancies until an amendment to the state Constitution specifically authorizing the Tennessee Plan was voted on in the November 2014 general election.

== Further litigation ==
As of January 2015, opponents of the Tennessee Plan were still fighting it in the courts. Their complaint centers around the wording of the ballot question in the 2014 referendum, and the fact that the other constitutional amendments on the ballot which involved changing constitutional language were worded in a way which showed both the language proposed for replacement and the proposed replacement language while the judicial amendment showed only the proposed new language without showing the language calling for the election of the judges of the Supreme Court and intermediate appeallate courts which was being proposed for deletion.

== See also ==
- Judicial nominating commission
- Missouri Plan

== Bibliography ==
- James W. Ely and Theodore Brown (2002), A history of the Tennessee Supreme Court, University of Tennessee Press, ISBN 1-57233-178-X, ISBN 978-1-57233-178-5
