= Winston College of Law =

Law school in Knoxville, Tennessee, US

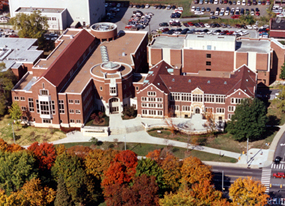
- Parent school: University of Tennessee
- Established: 1890
- School type: Public law school
- Parent endowment: $1.072 billion (2014)
- Dean: Paula Schaefer
- Location: Knoxville, Tennessee, United States; 35.9582°N 83.9294°W
- Enrollment: 460
- Faculty: 43
- USNWR ranking: 52nd (tie) (2024)
- Website: www.winston.utk.edu
- ABA profile: UT ABA profile

The Winston College of Law is the law school of the University of Tennessee located in Knoxville, Tennessee. Founded in 1890, the College of Law is fully accredited by the American Bar Association and is a charter member of the Association of American Law Schools.

== History ==
The College of Law began its existence as the Department of Law, under the deanship of former Tennessee Supreme Court justice Thomas J. Freeman.

== Curriculum and facilities ==
The University of Tennessee College of Law curriculum includes the Juris Doctor (J.D.) which offers academic concentrations in two areas, Advocacy and Dispute Resolution and Business Transactions.

The College of Law also offers dual degree programs in law and business, law and philosophy, law and public health, and law and public administration.

The Haslam College of Business and the College of Law offer a credit-sharing program leading to the conferral of both the Doctor of Jurisprudence and the Master of Business Administration degrees.

The Department of Philosophy in the College of Arts and Sciences and the College of Law offer a credit-sharing program leading to the conferral of both the Master of Arts in Philosophy and the Doctor of Jurisprudence degrees.

The Department of Public Health in the College of Education, Health & Human Sciences and the College of Law offer a credit-sharing program leading to the conferral of both the Master of Public Health and the Doctor of Jurisprudence degrees.

The Department of Political Science in the College of Arts and Sciences and the College of Law offer a credit-sharing program leading to the conferral of both the Master of Public Administration and the Doctor of Jurisprudence degrees.

=== Library ===
The 110,000-square-foot George C. Taylor Law Center completed in 1997 is located on Cumberland Avenue, four blocks from downtown Knoxville.

== Clinical programs ==
The College of Law's Advocacy Clinic is the longest continuously operating for-credit clinic in the country. In 2017, U.S. News & World Report ranked Tennessee's clinical programs 10th nationally among public institutions' clinical programs.

== Statistics ==
=== Admissions ===
For the 2019 entering class, the College of Law had 1,042 applications, 358 were admitted out of which 126 matriculated. The median LSAT score was 159, and the median GPA was 3.65. The 75% to 25% ranges for LSAT and GPA were 161 to 156 and 3.85 to 3.32.

=== Post-graduation employment ===
According to the College of Law's official 2019 ABA-required disclosures, 99 of 106 graduates of the class of 2018 obtained full-time, long-term, bar passage-required employment nine months after graduation.

== Costs ==
The total cost of attendance (indicating the cost of tuition, fees, and living expenses) at the College of Law for the 2019-2020 academic year is $40,660 for Tennessee residents and $59,334 for non-residents.

The Law School Transparency estimated debt-financed cost of attendance for three years is $146,655.

== Notable alumni ==
- Victor Henderson Ashe II (born January 1, 1945) is the former United States Ambassador to Poland. From 1987 to 2003, he was mayor of Knoxville, Tennessee. Ambassador Ashe concluded his service as Ambassador to Poland on September 26, 2009.
- Howard Henry Baker Jr. (November 15, 1925 – June 26, 2014) was an American politician and diplomat who served as a Republican U.S. Senator from Tennessee and Senate Majority Leader. Baker later served as White House Chief of Staff for President Ronald Reagan, and a United States Ambassador to Japan. Known in Washington, D.C., as the "Great Conciliator", Baker was often regarded as one of the most successful senators in terms of brokering compromises, enacting legislation and maintaining civility. Baker was a moderate conservative who was also respected enormously by most of his Democratic colleagues. Baker is famous for having asked aloud, "What did the President know and when did he know it?" during the Watergate scandal.
- Clifton B. Cates (August 31, 1893 – June 4, 1970) was an American general who served as the 19th Commandant of the Marine Corps (1948–1951). He was honored for his heroism during World War I at Belleau Wood and in World War II for inspired combat leadership at Iwo Jima. He is considered one of the most distinguished young officers of the first world War. He was one of the few officers from any branch of service to have commanded a platoon, a company, a battalion, a regiment, and a division each in combat.
- Ray Jenkins served as special counsel to the Senate Subcommittee on Investigations during the 1954 Army–McCarthy Hearings and was featured on the cover of Time magazine during the height of the hearings.
- Joel A. Katz is Billboard magazine's number-one ranked entertainment attorney. His lengthy client list includes artists like Kenny Chesney, James Taylor, Jimmy Buffett and Willie Nelson.
- Harold C. Malchow practiced law in Mississippi and Wisconsin; member of the Wisconsin State Assembly; for a time edited the only Republican newspaper in Mississippi.
- Glenn Harlan Reynolds (born August 27, 1960) is the Beauchamp Brogan Distinguished Professor of Law at the University of Tennessee College of Law, and is best known for his weblog, Instapundit, a widely read American political weblog.
- Robert Rochelle (JD 1969), Tennessee State Senator from 1970 to 2002.
- Ronald L. Schlicher (born September 16, 1956) is an American diplomat and career foreign service officer with the rank of Minister-Counselor in the Department of State. He served as the Deputy Chief of Mission in Lebanon (chargé d'affaires) 1994–96 and US Consul-General in Jerusalem in 2000-2002. He also served ambassador to Cyprus in 2006–08. On September 2, 2008, he assumed the position of Principal Deputy Assistant Coordinator for Counterterrorism.
- John Ward is the former radio play-by-play broadcaster for the University of Tennessee, primarily from 1965 until 1999, and was known as "The Voice of the Volunteers". One of his most well known calls was his introduction to each game, "It's football time in Tennessee!"
- Penny J. White is the Elvin E. Overton Distinguished Professor of Law at the University of Tennessee College of Law, and previously served as a justice on the Tennessee Supreme Court.

== Notable faculty ==
- Melanie D. Wilson, dean and Lindsay Young distinguished professor of law
