= List of federal judges appointed by Ronald Reagan =

Following is a list of all Article III United States federal judges appointed by President Ronald Reagan during his presidency. In total Reagan appointed: four justices to the Supreme Court of the United States, including the appointment of a sitting associate justice as chief justice, 83 judges to the United States courts of appeals, 290 judges to the United States district courts and 6 judges to the United States Court of International Trade. Reagan's total of 383 Article III judicial appointments is the most by any president.

In addition to these appointments, Reagan signed the Federal Courts Improvement Act in 1982, which transferred five judges from the United States Court of Customs and Patent Appeals, and seven judges from the appellate division of the United States Court of Claims, into the newly created United States Court of Appeals for the Federal Circuit. Although each of those twelve judges had been appointed to their original tribunals by previous presidents, Reagan's signing of the act effectively placed all of them on the new Court of Appeals.

10 of Reagan's appointees remain in active service, five appellate judges and five district judges. Two additional judges named by Reagan to district courts remain in active service as appellate judges by appointment of later presidents.

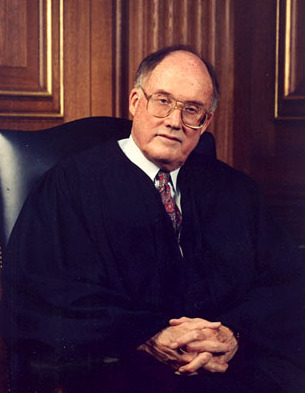
Reagan elevated William Rehnquist to the office of Chief Justice.

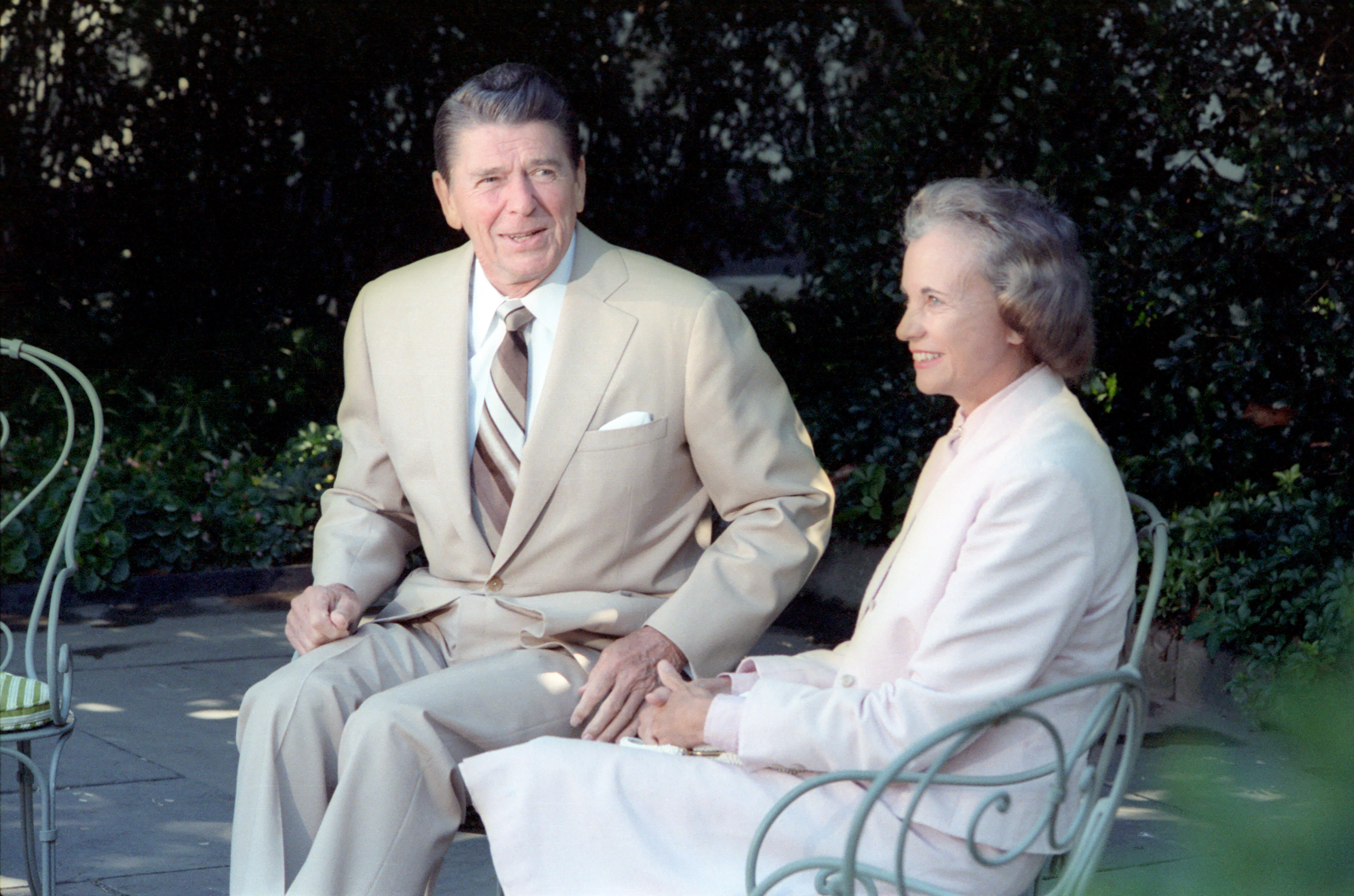
Sandra Day O'Connor was appointed by Reagan as the first woman to serve on the Supreme Court.

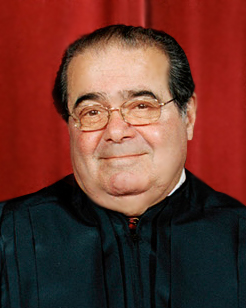
Reagan named Antonin Scalia to the United States Court of Appeals for the District of Columbia Circuit before elevating him to the Supreme Court.

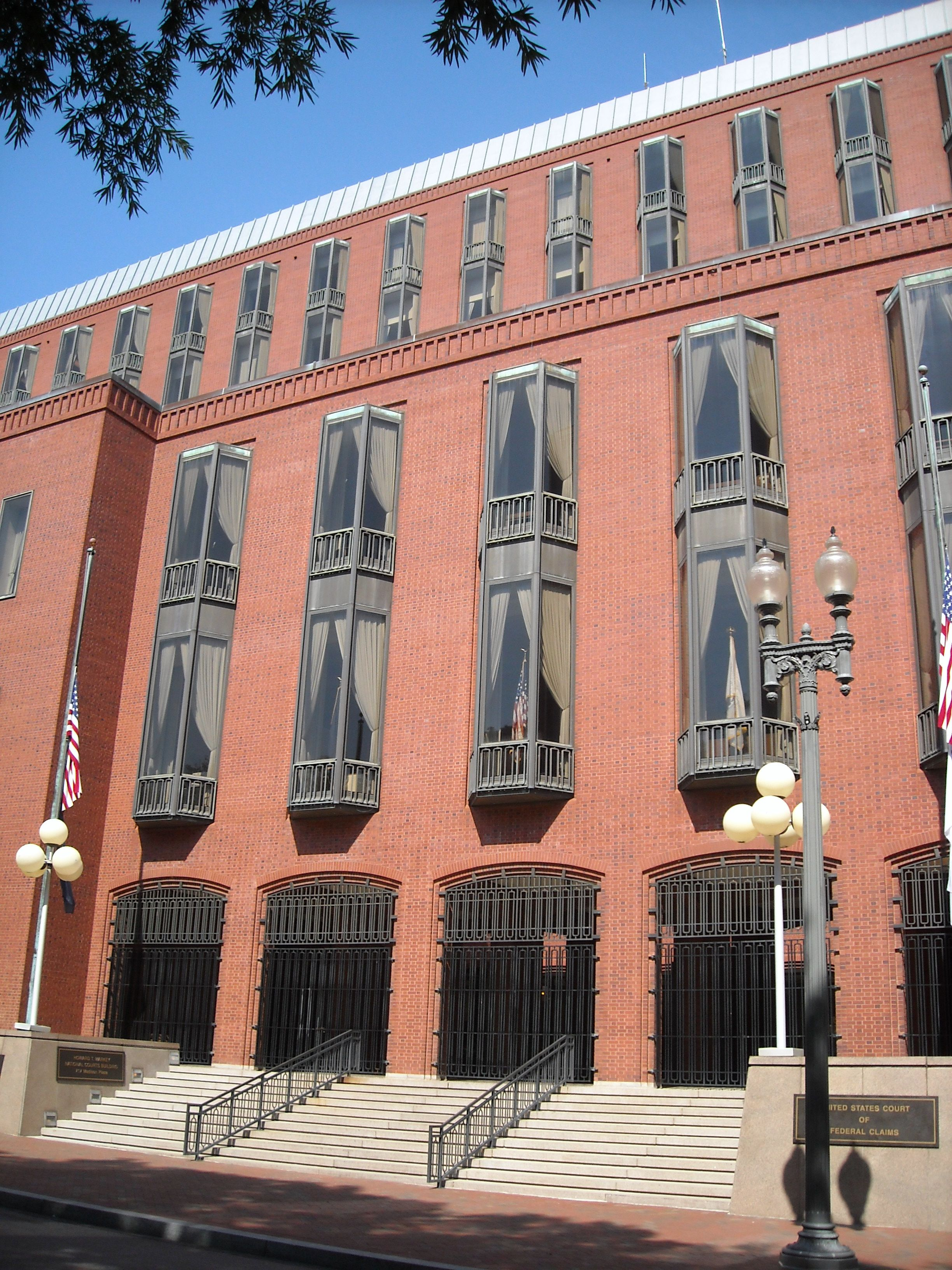
Reagan signed into law the bill that created the United States Court of Appeals for the Federal Circuit and reassigned judges from predecessor courts to the new Circuit Court.

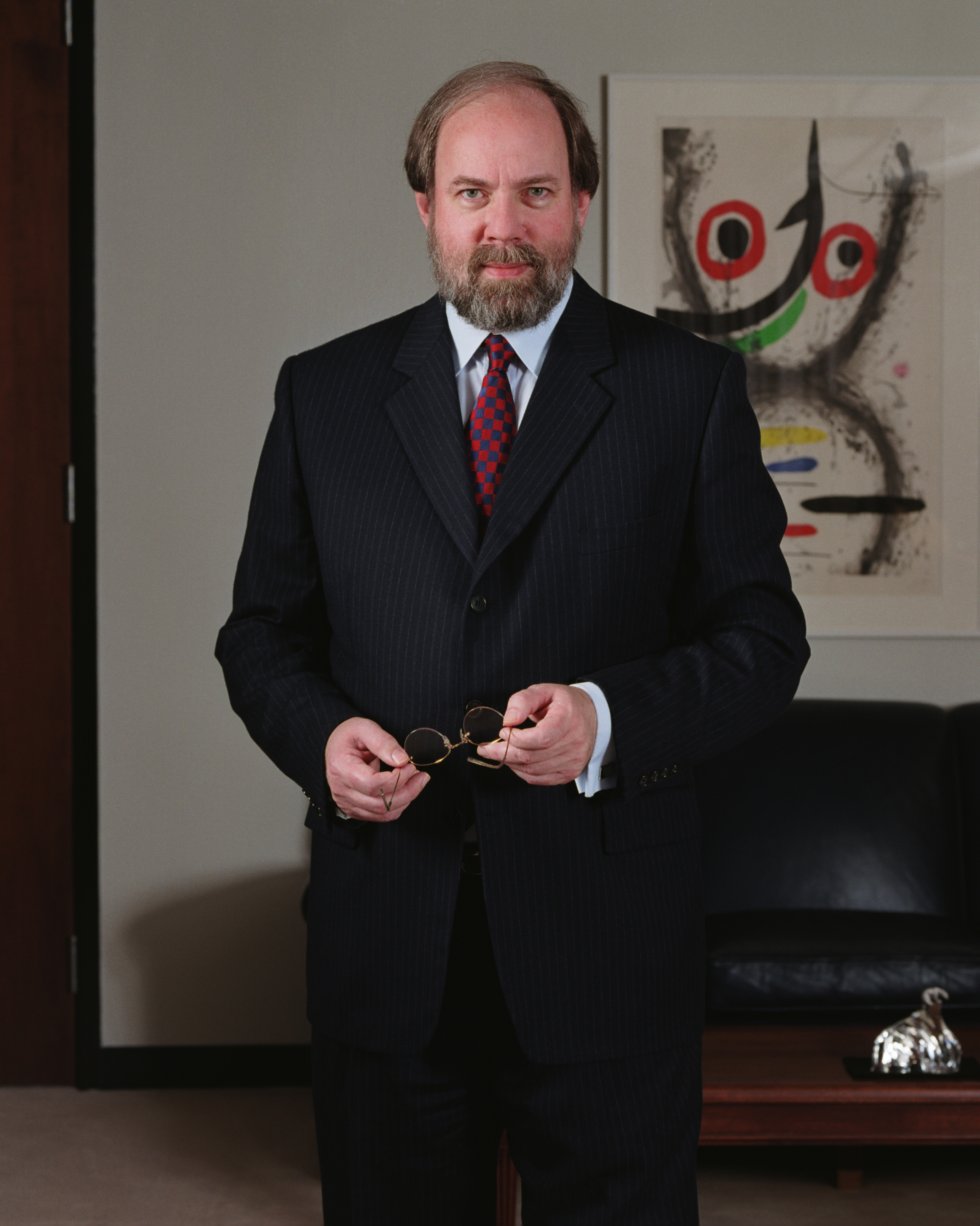
Frank Easterbrook, appointed by Reagan to the United States Court of Appeals for the Seventh Circuit.

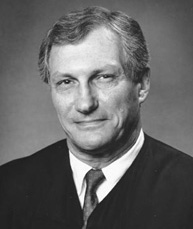
Robert C. Broomfield, appointed to the United States District Court for the District of Arizona, later served on the Foreign Intelligence Surveillance Court.

== United States Supreme Court justices ==
#	Justice	Seat	State	Former justice	Nomination date	Confirmation date	Confirmation vote	Began active service	Ended active service	Ended retired service
1	Sandra Day O'Connor	8	Arizona	Potter Stewart	July 1, 1981	September 21, 1981	99–0	September 25, 1981	January 31, 2006	December 1, 2023
2	William Rehnquist	Chief	Virginia (Note: Rehnquist was born and raised in Wisconsin, and lived and worked for various periods of years in Ohio, California, and Washington D.C., before settling in Arizona. During his years as Associate Justice, he moved to Virginia.)	Warren E. Burger	June 20, 1986	September 17, 1986	65–33	September 26, 1986	September 3, 2005	–
3	Antonin Scalia	9	Virginia	William Rehnquist	June 24, 1986	September 17, 1986	98–0	September 26, 1986	February 13, 2016	–
4	Anthony Kennedy	1	California	Lewis F. Powell Jr.	November 30, 1987	February 3, 1988	97–0	February 18, 1988	July 31, 2018	Incumbent

== Courts of appeals ==
#	Judge	Circuit	Nomination date	Confirmation date	Confirmation vote	Began active service	Ended active service	Ended senior status
1	Robert F. Chapman	Fourth	July 16, 1981	September 16, 1981	Unanimous consent	September 19, 1981	May 31, 1991	April 18, 2018
2	William Lockhart Garwood	Fifth	September 17, 1981	October 21, 1981	Unanimous consent	October 26, 1981	January 23, 1997	July 14, 2011
3	Richard J. Cardamone	Second	October 1, 1981	October 29, 1981	Unanimous consent	October 29, 1981	November 13, 1993	October 16, 2015
4	Lawrence W. Pierce	Second	September 8, 1981	November 18, 1981	Unanimous consent	November 18, 1981	January 1, 1990	March 31, 1995
5	Jesse E. Eschbach	Seventh	October 20, 1981	November 24, 1981	Unanimous consent	December 1, 1981	November 4, 1985	October 25, 2005
6	Richard Posner	Seventh	October 27, 1981	November 24, 1981	Unanimous consent	December 1, 1981	September 2, 2017	–
7	Edward R. Becker	Third	November 16, 1981	December 3, 1981	Unanimous consent	December 3, 1981	May 4, 2003	May 19, 2006
8	Ralph K. Winter Jr.	Second	November 18, 1981	December 9, 1981	Unanimous consent	December 10, 1981	September 30, 2000	December 8, 2020
9	Robert Bork	D.C.	December 7, 1981	February 8, 1982	Unanimous consent	February 9, 1982	February 5, 1988	–
10	Leroy John Contie Jr.	Sixth	January 26, 1982	March 4, 1982	Unanimous consent	March 9, 1982	June 30, 1986	May 11, 2001
11	John R. Gibson	Eighth	February 2, 1982	March 4, 1982	Unanimous consent	March 9, 1982	January 1, 1994	April 19, 2014
12	Robert B. Krupansky	Sixth	January 28, 1982	March 4, 1982	Unanimous consent	March 10, 1982	July 1, 1991	November 8, 2004
13	John Louis Coffey	Seventh	February 19, 1982	March 18, 1982	Unanimous consent	March 19, 1982	July 2, 2004	November 10, 2012
14	George C. Pratt	Second	April 26, 1982	June 18, 1982	Unanimous consent	June 21, 1982	May 22, 1993	January 31, 1995
15	Patrick Higginbotham	Fifth	July 1, 1982	July 27, 1982	Unanimous consent	July 30, 1982	August 28, 2006	Incumbent
16	E. Grady Jolly	Fifth	July 1, 1982	July 27, 1982	Unanimous consent	July 30, 1982	October 3, 2017	March 16, 2026
17	Antonin Scalia	D.C.	July 15, 1982	August 5, 1982	Unanimous consent	August 17, 1982	September 26, 1986	Elevated
18	Harry W. Wellford	Sixth	July 27, 1982 (Note: Previously nominated by President Ford on August 4, 1976 to a different seat on the same court. That nomination expired at the end of the term. Renominated on July 27, 1982 to a different seat on the same court by President Reagan.)	August 20, 1982	Unanimous consent	August 20, 1982	January 15, 1991	April 17, 2021
19	George Gardner Fagg	Eighth	September 22, 1982	October 1, 1982	Unanimous consent	October 1, 1982	May 1, 1999	July 14, 2015
20	Joel Flaum	Seventh	April 14, 1983	May 4, 1983	Unanimous consent	May 5, 1983	November 30, 2020	December 4, 2024
21	Pasco Bowman II	Eighth	May 24, 1983	July 18, 1983	Voice vote	July 19, 1983	August 1, 2003	Incumbent
22	Ken Starr	D.C.	July 13, 1983 (Note: Renominated on September 13, 1983.)	September 20, 1983	Voice vote	September 20, 1983	May 26, 1989	–
23	W. Eugene Davis	Fifth	November 1, 1983	November 15, 1983	Voice vote	November 16, 1983	December 31, 2016	Incumbent
24	Pauline Newman	Federal	January 30, 1984	February 27, 1984	Voice vote	February 28, 1984	Incumbent	–
25	Robert Beezer	Ninth	March 2, 1984	March 27, 1984	Voice vote	March 28, 1984	July 31, 1996	March 30, 2012
26	Jean Galloway Bissell	Federal	May 24, 1984	June 8, 1984	Unanimous consent	June 11, 1984	February 4, 1990	–
27	Robert Madden Hill	Fifth	June 4, 1984	June 15, 1984	Voice vote	June 15, 1984	October 19, 1987	–
28	J. Harvie Wilkinson III	Fourth	November 10, 1983 (Note: Renominated on January 30, 1984.)	August 9, 1984	58–39	August 13, 1984	Incumbent	–
29	Cynthia Holcomb Hall	Ninth	August 1, 1984	October 3, 1984	Voice vote	October 4, 1984	August 31, 1997	February 26, 2011
30	Herbert Theodore Milburn	Sixth	September 6, 1984	October 3, 1984	Voice vote	October 4, 1984	July 1, 1996	April 1, 2016
31	Emory M. Sneeden	Fourth	August 1, 1984	October 4, 1984	Voice vote	October 4, 1984	March 1, 1986	–
32	Juan R. Torruella	First	August 1, 1984	October 3, 1984	Voice vote	October 4, 1984	October 26, 2020	–
33	Charles E. Wiggins	Ninth	August 1, 1984	October 3, 1984	Voice vote	October 11, 1984	December 31, 1996	March 2, 2000
34	Melvin T. Brunetti	Ninth	October 5, 1984 (Note: Renominated on February 26, 1985.)	April 3, 1985	Voice vote	April 4, 1985	November 11, 1999	October 30, 2009
35	Frank Easterbrook	Seventh	October 5, 1984 (Note: Renominated on February 27, 1985.)	April 3, 1985	Voice vote	April 4, 1985	Incumbent	–
36	Edith Jones	Fifth	September 17, 1984	April 3, 1985	Voice vote	April 4, 1985	Incumbent	–
37	Carol Los Mansmann	Third	March 7, 1985	April 3, 1985	Voice vote	April 4, 1985	March 9, 2002	–
38	Walter King Stapleton	Third	March 27, 1985	April 3, 1985	Voice vote	April 4, 1985	June 2, 1999	November 23, 2024
39	John Carbone Porfilio	Tenth	April 5, 1985	May 3, 1985	Voice vote	May 10, 1985	October 15, 1999	Incumbent
40	Kenneth Francis Ripple	Seventh	April 1, 1985	May 3, 1985	Voice vote	May 10, 1985	September 1, 2008	Incumbent
41	Roger Miner	Second	June 25, 1985	July 19, 1985	Voice vote	July 22, 1985	January 1, 1997	February 18, 2012
42	Roger Leland Wollman	Eighth	June 25, 1985	July 19, 1985	Voice vote	July 22, 1985	December 14, 2018	Incumbent
43	Stephen H. Anderson	Tenth	July 23, 1985	October 16, 1985	Voice vote	October 16, 1985	January 1, 2000	Incumbent
44	Ralph B. Guy Jr.	Sixth	July 23, 1985	October 16, 1985	Voice vote	October 17, 1985	September 1, 1994	April 20, 2026
45	David Aldrich Nelson	Sixth	September 9, 1985	October 16, 1985	Voice vote	October 17, 1985	October 1, 1999	October 1, 2010
46	James L. Ryan	Sixth	September 9, 1985	October 16, 1985	Voice vote	October 17, 1985	January 1, 2000	Incumbent
47	Laurence Silberman	D.C.	September 11, 1985	October 25, 1985	Voice vote	October 28, 1985	November 1, 2000	October 2, 2022
48	Alex Kozinski	Ninth	June 5, 1985	November 7, 1985	54–43	November 7, 1985	December 18, 2017	–
49	Deanell Reece Tacha	Tenth	October 31, 1985	December 16, 1985	Voice vote	December 16, 1985	January 27, 2011	June 1, 2011
50	Frank Altimari	Second	October 23, 1985	December 16, 1985	Voice vote	December 17, 1985	January 1, 1996	July 19, 1998
51	Glenn L. Archer Jr.	Federal	October 16, 1985	December 16, 1985	Voice vote	December 17, 1985	December 24, 1997	July 27, 2011
52	Bobby Baldock	Tenth	October 7, 1985	December 16, 1985	Voice vote	December 17, 1985	January 26, 2001	Incumbent
53	James L. Buckley	D.C.	October 16, 1985	December 17, 1985	84–11	December 17, 1985	August 31, 1996	August 18, 2023
54	John T. Noonan Jr.	Ninth	October 16, 1985	December 16, 1985	Voice vote	December 17, 1985	December 27, 1996	April 17, 2017
55	David R. Thompson	Ninth	October 7, 1985	December 16, 1985	Voice vote	December 17, 1985	December 31, 1998	February 19, 2011
56	Frank J. Magill	Eighth	January 21, 1986	March 3, 1986	Voice vote	March 4, 1986	April 1, 1997	June 2, 2013
57	Danny Julian Boggs	Sixth	December 9, 1985 (Note: Renominated on January 29, 1986.)	March 3, 1986	Voice vote	March 25, 1986	February 28, 2017	Incumbent
58	J. Daniel Mahoney	Second	February 7, 1986	March 27, 1986	Voice vote	April 7, 1986	October 23, 1996	–
59	James Larry Edmondson	Eleventh	March 26, 1986	April 29, 1986	Voice vote	May 7, 1986	July 15, 2012	Incumbent
60	William Walter Wilkins	Fourth	June 3, 1986	June 13, 1986	Voice vote	June 16, 1986	July 1, 2007	October 5, 2008
61	Stephen F. Williams	D.C.	February 19, 1986	June 13, 1986	Voice vote	June 16, 1986	September 30, 2001	August 7, 2020
62	Alan Eugene Norris	Sixth	April 22, 1986	June 6, 1986	Voice vote	July 1, 1986	July 1, 2001	Incumbent
63	Daniel Anthony Manion	Seventh	February 21, 1986	June 26, 1986	48–46	July 24, 1986	December 18, 2007	August 31, 2024
64	Diarmuid O'Scannlain	Ninth	August 11, 1986	September 25, 1986	Voice vote	September 26, 1986	December 31, 2016	Incumbent
65	Douglas H. Ginsburg	D.C.	September 23, 1986	October 8, 1986	Voice vote	October 14, 1986	October 14, 2011	Incumbent
66	Bruce M. Selya	First	September 26, 1986	October 8, 1986	Voice vote	October 14, 1986	December 31, 2006	February 22, 2025
67	Morton Ira Greenberg	Third	February 11, 1987	March 20, 1987	Voice vote	March 23, 1987	June 30, 2000	January 28, 2021
68	Edward Leavy	Ninth	February 2, 1987	March 20, 1987	Voice vote	March 23, 1987	May 19, 1997	March 12, 2023
69	Michael Stephen Kanne	Seventh	February 2, 1987	May 19, 1987	Voice vote	May 20, 1987	June 16, 2022	–
70	Haldane Robert Mayer	Federal	February 3, 1987	June 11, 1987	Voice vote	June 15, 1987	June 30, 2010	Incumbent
71	William D. Hutchinson	Third	June 26, 1987	August 5, 1987	Voice vote	August 6, 1987	October 8, 1995	–
72	Anthony Joseph Scirica	Third	June 26, 1987	August 5, 1987	Voice vote	August 6, 1987	July 1, 2013	Incumbent
73	David B. Sentelle	D.C.	February 2, 1987	September 9, 1987	87–0	September 11, 1987	February 12, 2013	Incumbent
74	C. Arlen Beam	Eighth	July 1, 1987	November 6, 1987	Unanimous consent	November 9, 1987	February 1, 2001	October 31, 2025
75	Robert Cowen	Third	August 7, 1987	November 6, 1987	Unanimous consent	November 9, 1987	September 4, 1998	Incumbent
76	Jerry Edwin Smith	Fifth	June 2, 1987	December 19, 1987	Unanimous consent	December 21, 1987	Incumbent	–
77	Wade Brorby	Tenth	August 7, 1987	February 16, 1988	Voice vote	February 17, 1988	May 25, 2001	Incumbent
78	Paul Redmond Michel	Federal	December 19, 1987	February 29, 1988	Voice vote	March 4, 1988	May 31, 2010	–
79	Stephen S. Trott	Ninth	August 7, 1987	March 24, 1988	Voice vote	March 25, 1988	December 31, 2004	Incumbent
80	Emmett Ripley Cox	Eleventh	December 19, 1987	April 15, 1988	Unanimous consent	April 18, 1988	December 18, 2000	March 3, 2021
81	David M. Ebel	Tenth	December 18, 1987	April 19, 1988	Unanimous consent	April 20, 1988	January 16, 2006	Incumbent
82	John M. Duhé Jr.	Fifth	June 27, 1988	October 14, 1988	Unanimous consent	October 17, 1988	April 7, 1999	May 16, 2025
83	Richard Lowell Nygaard	Third	May 25, 1988	October 14, 1988	Unanimous consent	October 17, 1988	July 9, 2005	Incumbent

== District courts ==
#	Judge	Court (Note: See List of United States district and territorial courts)	Nomination date	Confirmation date	Began active service	Ended active service	Ended senior status
1	William Walter Wilkins	D.S.C.	July 9, 1981	July 20, 1981	July 22, 1981	July 10, 1986	Elevated
2	William Charles Lee	N.D. Ind.	July 1, 1981	July 27, 1981	July 28, 1981	February 3, 2003	January 20, 2024
3	Joseph Edward Stevens Jr.	E.D. Mo. W.D. Mo.	July 9, 1981	September 16, 1981	September 18, 1981	July 1, 1995	December 18, 1998
4	D. Brook Bartlett	W.D. Mo.	July 9, 1981	September 16, 1981	September 19, 1981	January 21, 2000	–
5	John R. Gibson	W.D. Mo.	July 9, 1981	September 16, 1981	September 19, 1981	March 30, 1982	Elevated
6	John C. Coughenour	W.D. Wash.	August 11, 1981	September 25, 1981	September 28, 1981	July 27, 2006	Incumbent
7	Conrad K. Cyr	D. Me.	August 11, 1981	September 25, 1981	September 28, 1981	November 20, 1989	Elevated
8	Joseph M. McLaughlin	E.D.N.Y.	July 29, 1981	September 25, 1981	September 28, 1981	October 18, 1990	Elevated
9	Roger Miner	N.D.N.Y.	July 28, 1981	September 25, 1981	September 28, 1981	August 2, 1985	Elevated
10	John E. Sprizzo	S.D.N.Y.	July 29, 1981 (Note: Previously nominated by President Carter on June 2, 1980. That nomination expired at the end of the term. Renominated on July 29, 1981 by President Reagan.)	September 25, 1981	September 28, 1981	January 1, 2000	December 16, 2008
11	Henry Rupert Wilhoit Jr.	E.D. Ky.	August 11, 1981	September 25, 1981	September 28, 1981	December 31, 2000	September 12, 2022
12	Hayden Wilson Head Jr.	S.D. Tex.	September 17, 1981	October 21, 1981	October 26, 1981	November 13, 2009	Incumbent
13	James Robertson Nowlin	W.D. Tex.	September 17, 1981	October 21, 1981	October 26, 1981	May 31, 2003	Incumbent
14	Hugh Franklin Waters	W.D. Ark.	August 28, 1981	October 21, 1981	October 26, 1981	August 1, 1997	April 16, 2002
15	Paul A. Magnuson	D. Minn.	September 28, 1981	October 29, 1981	October 29, 1981	February 9, 2002	Incumbent
16	Robert Daniel Potter	W.D.N.C.	October 1, 1981	October 29, 1981	October 29, 1981	May 1, 1994	July 2, 2009
17	C. Arlen Beam	D. Neb.	October 14, 1981	November 18, 1981	November 18, 1981	November 9, 1987	Elevated
18	Emmett Ripley Cox	S.D. Ala.	October 14, 1981	November 18, 1981	November 18, 1981	April 25, 1988	Elevated
19	Cynthia Holcomb Hall	C.D. Cal.	October 14, 1981	November 18, 1981	November 18, 1981	October 4, 1984	Elevated
20	John Bailey Jones	D.S.D.	October 20, 1981	November 18, 1981	November 18, 1981	January 1, 1995	January 30, 2023
21	James Cacheris	E.D. Va.	October 20, 1981	November 24, 1981	December 1, 1981	March 30, 1998	January 26, 2018
22	Clyde H. Hamilton	D.S.C.	November 13, 1981	November 24, 1981	December 1, 1981	July 31, 1991	Elevated
23	John H. Moore II	M.D. Fla.	November 4, 1981 (Note: Previously nominated by President Ford on August 4, 1976 to the Southern District of Florida. That nomination expired at the end of the term. Renominated on January 26, 1982 to the Middle District of Florida by President Reagan.)	November 24, 1981	December 1, 1981	December 31, 1995	July 19, 2013
24	Robert G. Doumar	E.D. Va.	November 5, 1981	December 3, 1981	December 3, 1981	April 30, 1996	November 4, 2023
25	Jackson L. Kiser	W.D. Va.	November 4, 1981	December 3, 1981	December 3, 1981	April 30, 1997	October 21, 2020
26	Sam A. Crow	D. Kan.	November 24, 1981	December 9, 1981	December 10, 1981	November 15, 1996	December 2, 2022
27	J. Owen Forrester	N.D. Ga.	November 24, 1981	December 9, 1981	December 10, 1981	April 27, 2004	July 1, 2014
28	I. Leo Glasser	E.D.N.Y.	November 23, 1981 (Note: Previously nominated by President Carter to a different seat on the same court on September 17, 1980. That nomination expired at the end of the term. Renominated on November 23, 1981 to a different seat on the same court by President Reagan.)	December 9, 1981	December 10, 1981	July 1, 1993	Incumbent
29	Alvin Krenzler	N.D. Ohio	November 17, 1981	December 9, 1981	December 10, 1981	January 1, 1992	July 6, 1992
30	John C. Shabaz	W.D. Wis.	November 4, 1981	December 9, 1981	December 10, 1981	January 20, 2009	August 31, 2012
31	David Lynn Russell	E.D. Okla. N.D. Okla. W.D. Okla.	December 4, 1981	December 16, 1981	December 17, 1981	December 1, 1990; December 1, 1990; July 7, 2013	– – Incumbent
32	Harold L. Ryan	D. Idaho	December 7, 1981	December 16, 1981	December 17, 1981	December 30, 1992	April 10, 1995
33	Michael Stephen Kanne	N.D. Ind.	December 4, 1981	February 8, 1982	February 9, 1982	May 21, 1987	Elevated
34	James Tyne Moody	N.D. Ind.	December 4, 1981	February 8, 1982	February 9, 1982	June 17, 2003	Incumbent
35	Elizabeth A. Kovachevich	M.D. Fla.	January 26, 1982 (Note: Previously nominated by President Ford on June 11, 1976 to a different seat on the same court. That nomination expired at the end of the term. Renominated on January 26, 1982 to a different seat on the same court by President Reagan.)	March 4, 1982	March 9, 1982	December 14, 2018	Incumbent
36	Eugene F. Lynch	N.D. Cal.	January 25, 1982	March 4, 1982	March 9, 1982	March 14, 1997	July 12, 1997
37	William W. Caldwell	M.D. Pa.	February 19, 1982	March 18, 1982	March 19, 1982	May 31, 1994	May 19, 2019
38	Carol Los Mansmann	W.D. Pa.	February 23, 1982	March 18, 1982	March 19, 1982	April 22, 1985	Elevated
39	Glenn E. Mencer	W.D. Pa.	February 19, 1982	March 18, 1982	March 19, 1982	April 18, 1994	April 17, 2007
40	Robert Everett Coyle	E.D. Cal.	March 11, 1982	March 31, 1982	April 1, 1982	May 13, 1996	May 7, 2012
41	Walter Evan Black Jr.	D. Md.	March 11, 1982	April 20, 1982	April 21, 1982	October 21, 1994	September 29, 2014
42	William Thomas Hart	N.D. Ill.	March 11, 1982	April 20, 1982	April 21, 1982	June 1, 1996	January 17, 2023
43	John Albert Nordberg	N.D. Ill.	March 11, 1982	April 20, 1982	April 21, 1982	June 18, 1994	March 12, 2021
44	Michael Anthony Telesca	W.D.N.Y.	March 11, 1982	April 20, 1982	April 21, 1982	May 3, 1996	March 5, 2020
45	Harold Fong	D. Haw.	February 11, 1982	June 18, 1982	June 21, 1982	April 20, 1995	–
46	A. J. McNamara	E.D. La.	May 5, 1982	June 18, 1982	June 21, 1982	June 9, 2001	December 2, 2014
47	Maurice M. Paul	N.D. Fla.	April 26, 1982	June 18, 1982	June 21, 1982	July 31, 1997	December 29, 2016
48	John William Potter	N.D. Ohio	May 5, 1982	June 18, 1982	June 21, 1982	August 1, 1992	October 3, 2013
49	Thomas Penfield Jackson	D.D.C.	May 24, 1982	June 24, 1982	June 25, 1982	January 31, 2002	August 31, 2004
50	Henry Mentz	E.D. La.	June 2, 1982	June 24, 1982	June 25, 1982	July 1, 1992	December 31, 2001
51	John Carbone Porfilio	D. Colo.	May 18, 1982	June 24, 1982	June 25, 1982	May 13, 1985	Elevated
52	Jaime Pieras Jr.	D.P.R.	June 2, 1982	July 13, 1982	July 15, 1982	August 1, 1993	June 11, 2011
53	Richard Arthur Gadbois Jr.	C.D. Cal.	June 28, 1982	July 27, 1982	July 28, 1982	January 24, 1996	October 2, 1996
54	J. Lawrence Irving	S.D. Cal.	July 15, 1982	July 28, 1982	July 28, 1982	December 31, 1990	–
55	Michael M. Mihm	C.D. Ill.	July 27, 1982	August 5, 1982	August 6, 1982	October 1, 2009	Incumbent
56	William Acker	N.D. Ala.	July 22, 1982	August 18, 1982	August 18, 1982	May 31, 1996	June 21, 2018
57	Bruce M. Selya	D.R.I.	July 27, 1982	August 18, 1982	August 18, 1982	November 24, 1986	Elevated
58	Thomas F. Hogan	D.D.C.	August 10, 1982	August 20, 1982	August 20, 1982	May 1, 2008	Incumbent
59	Ross Thompson Roberts	W.D. Mo.	August 6, 1982	August 20, 1982	August 20, 1982	April 24, 1987	–
60	David Dudley Dowd Jr.	N.D. Ohio	August 24, 1982	September 22, 1982	September 23, 1982	June 30, 1996	August 4, 2016
61	Edward Rafeedie	C.D. Cal.	August 24, 1982	September 22, 1982	September 24, 1982	January 6, 1996	March 25, 2008
62	Raymond L. Acosta	D.P.R.	September 9, 1982	September 29, 1982	September 30, 1982	June 1, 1994	December 23, 2014
63	James Carroll Fox	E.D.N.C.	September 14, 1982	September 29, 1982	September 30, 1982	January 31, 2001	March 23, 2019
64	Frank Altimari	E.D.N.Y.	November 23, 1982	December 10, 1982	December 10, 1982	December 23, 1985	Elevated
65	John Winslow Bissell	D.N.J.	November 23, 1982	December 10, 1982	December 10, 1982	September 1, 2005	–
66	Frank William Bullock Jr.	M.D.N.C.	November 23, 1982	December 10, 1982	December 10, 1982	December 31, 2005	August 1, 2006
67	Paul Edward Plunkett	N.D. Ill.	November 23, 1982	December 10, 1982	December 10, 1982	July 10, 1998	March 21, 2018
68	Sam H. Bell	N.D. Ohio	November 23, 1982	December 21, 1982	December 22, 1982	October 30, 1996	December 23, 2010
69	A. Joe Fish	N.D. Tex.	January 31, 1983	February 23, 1983	February 24, 1983	November 12, 2007	Incumbent
70	Pamela Ann Rymer	C.D. Cal.	January 31, 1983	February 23, 1983	February 24, 1983	May 23, 1989	Elevated
71	Shirley Wohl Kram	S.D.N.Y.	January 31, 1983	March 2, 1983	March 2, 1983	May 23, 1993	August 21, 2009
72	William H. Barbour Jr.	S.D. Miss.	March 15, 1983	April 21, 1983	April 25, 1983	February 4, 2006	January 8, 2021
73	Ricardo Hinojosa	S.D. Tex.	April 12, 1983	May 4, 1983	May 5, 1983	May 21, 2025	Incumbent
74	Bobby Baldock	D.N.M.	May 2, 1983	June 6, 1983	June 7, 1983	January 24, 1986	Elevated
75	Julia Smith Gibbons	W.D. Tenn.	April 12, 1983	June 6, 1983	June 7, 1983	August 2, 2002	Elevated
76	Herbert Theodore Milburn	E.D. Tenn.	April 14, 1983	June 6, 1983	June 7, 1983	October 9, 1984	Elevated
77	Leonard D. Wexler	E.D.N.Y.	May 11, 1983	June 22, 1983	June 22, 1983	June 30, 1994	March 31, 2018
78	Gene Carter	D. Me.	May 26, 1983	June 22, 1983	June 23, 1983	January 2, 2003	November 17, 2021
79	Peter Collins Dorsey	D. Conn.	June 7, 1983	July 18, 1983	July 19, 1983	January 2, 1998	January 21, 2012
80	Stephen N. Limbaugh Sr.	E.D. Mo. W.D. Mo.	June 7, 1983	July 18, 1983	July 19, 1983	May 1, 1996	July 31, 2008
81	Hector Manuel Laffitte	D.P.R.	May 26, 1983	July 26, 1983	July 27, 1983	November 15, 2005	February 16, 2007
82	Thomas Newman O'Neill Jr.	E.D. Pa.	June 21, 1983	August 4, 1983	August 5, 1983	July 6, 1996	January 16, 2018
83	Marvin Katz	E.D. Pa.	June 21, 1983	August 4, 1983	August 6, 1983	August 26, 1997	October 12, 2010
84	James McGirr Kelly	E.D. Pa.	June 21, 1983	August 4, 1983	August 6, 1983	March 31, 1996	March 5, 2005
85	John F. Keenan	S.D.N.Y.	July 21, 1983	September 20, 1983	September 20, 1983	December 31, 1996	October 27, 2024
86	John P. Vukasin Jr.	N.D. Cal.	December 17, 1982 (Note: Renominated on January 31, 1983 and September 13, 1983.)	September 20, 1983	September 20, 1983	September 20, 1993	–
87	Martin Leach-Cross Feldman	E.D. La.	September 9, 1983	October 4, 1983	October 5, 1983	January 27, 2022	–
88	Roger Vinson	N.D. Fla.	September 9, 1983	October 4, 1983	October 5, 1983	March 31, 2005	April 1, 2023
89	Maryanne Trump Barry	D.N.J.	September 14, 1983	October 6, 1983	October 7, 1983	October 25, 1999	Elevated
90	Thomas John Curran	E.D. Wis.	September 20, 1983	November 4, 1983	November 7, 1983	January 1, 1997	July 17, 2012
91	Elizabeth Virginia Hallanan	S.D. W. Va.	November 8, 1983	November 11, 1983	November 14, 1983	December 1, 1996	June 8, 2004
92	Stanley S. Harris	D.D.C.	November 1, 1983	November 11, 1983	November 14, 1983	February 1, 1996	June 2, 2001
93	Thomas Gray Hull	E.D. Tenn.	October 24, 1983	November 9, 1983	November 14, 1983	October 1, 2002	July 29, 2008
94	Lenore Carrero Nesbitt	S.D. Fla.	October 31, 1983	November 15, 1983	November 16, 1983	July 19, 1998	October 6, 2001
95	G. Kendall Sharp	M.D. Fla.	November 1, 1983	November 15, 1983	November 16, 1983	January 1, 2000	March 24, 2022
96	George E. Woods	E.D. Mich.	November 1, 1983	November 15, 1983	November 16, 1983	November 16, 1993	August 13, 2004
97	John R. Hargrove Sr.	D. Md.	November 10, 1983	February 9, 1984	February 10, 1984	February 21, 1994	April 1, 1997
98	Sarah Evans Barker	S.D. Ind.	February 14, 1984	March 13, 1984	March 14, 1984	June 30, 2014	Incumbent
99	Edward J. Garcia	E.D. Cal.	February 16, 1984	March 13, 1984	March 14, 1984	November 24, 1996	April 29, 2023
100	Harry Lindley Hupp	C.D. Cal.	February 14, 1984	March 20, 1984	March 21, 1984	April 1, 1997	January 27, 2004
101	Neal Brooks Biggers Jr.	N.D. Miss.	March 1, 1984	March 27, 1984	March 28, 1984	October 1, 2000	October 15, 2023
102	Edward C. Prado	W.D. Tex.	March 6, 1984	March 30, 1984	March 30, 1984	May 13, 2003	Elevated
103	Terrence Boyle	E.D.N.C.	April 4, 1984	April 24, 1984	May 3, 1984	Incumbent	–
104	William Docker Browning	D. Ariz.	April 4, 1984	April 24, 1984	May 3, 1984	May 14, 1998	February 26, 2008
105	Lloyd D. George	D. Nev.	April 18, 1984	April 30, 1984	May 3, 1984	December 1, 1997	October 7, 2020
106	Edward Leavy	D. Ore.	March 26, 1984	April 24, 1984	May 3, 1984	April 8, 1987	Elevated
107	Joseph J. Longobardi	D. Del.	April 4, 1984	April 24, 1984	May 3, 1984	June 15, 1997	Incumbent
108	Alicemarie Huber Stotler	C.D. Cal.	April 4, 1984	May 1, 1984	May 3, 1984	January 5, 2009	June 9, 2014
109	John M. Duhé Jr.	W.D. La.	May 15, 1984	June 8, 1984	June 11, 1984	November 9, 1988	Elevated
110	Tom Stewart Lee	S.D. Miss.	May 15, 1984	June 11, 1984	June 11, 1984	April 8, 2006	Incumbent
111	Paul Gerhardt Rosenblatt	D. Ariz.	May 15, 1984	June 8, 1984	June 11, 1984	October 30, 2003	October 6, 2019
112	Franklin S. Billings Jr.	D. Vt.	May 25, 1984	June 15, 1984	June 15, 1984	September 9, 1994	March 9, 2014
113	Rudi M. Brewster	S.D. Cal.	May 24, 1984	June 15, 1984	June 15, 1984	July 1, 1998	September 7, 2012
114	James M. Ideman	C.D. Cal.	May 24, 1984	June 15, 1984	June 15, 1984	April 2, 1998	September 11, 1998
115	Peter K. Leisure	S.D.N.Y.	May 25, 1984	June 15, 1984	June 15, 1984	March 21, 1997	September 17, 2013
116	William J. Rea	C.D. Cal.	May 24, 1984	June 15, 1984	June 15, 1984	March 31, 1998	August 3, 2005
117	H. Russel Holland	D. Alaska	March 6, 1984	March 26, 1984	July 16, 1984	September 18, 2001	Incumbent
118	Ilana Rovner	N.D. Ill.	June 19, 1984	September 12, 1984	September 12, 1984	August 17, 1992	Elevated
119	Charles A. Legge	N.D. Cal.	June 19, 1984	September 17, 1984	September 18, 1984	June 30, 2001	–
120	Marcel Livaudais Jr.	E.D. La.	June 19, 1984	September 17, 1984	September 18, 1984	December 31, 1996	December 31, 2008
121	Anthony Joseph Scirica	E.D. Pa.	June 19, 1984	September 17, 1984	September 18, 1984	September 11, 1987	Elevated
122	Thomas Aquinas Higgins	M.D. Tenn.	September 6, 1984	October 3, 1984	October 4, 1984	February 28, 1999	September 11, 2018
123	William Duffy Keller	C.D. Cal.	September 11, 1984	October 3, 1984	October 4, 1984	October 29, 1999	November 2, 2025
124	Howard D. McKibben	D. Nev.	September 28, 1984	October 4, 1984	October 4, 1984	April 1, 2005	Incumbent
125	Charles Ronald Norgle Sr.	N.D. Ill.	September 10, 1984	October 3, 1984	October 4, 1984	October 4, 2022	Incumbent
126	Walter Scott Smith Jr.	W.D. Tex.	September 11, 1984	October 3, 1984	October 4, 1984	September 14, 2016	–
127	Richard Fred Suhrheinrich	E.D. Mich.	September 6, 1984	October 3, 1984	October 4, 1984	July 13, 1990	Elevated
128	James Howard Jarvis II	E.D. Tenn.	September 6, 1984	October 11, 1984	October 12, 1984	February 28, 2002	June 6, 2007
129	F. A. Little Jr.	W.D. La.	September 11, 1984	October 11, 1984	October 12, 1984	May 30, 2002	May 15, 2006
130	Alice M. Batchelder	N.D. Ohio	October 5, 1984 (Note: Renominated on February 28, 1985.)	April 3, 1985	April 4, 1985	January 4, 1992	Elevated
131	Howell Cobb	E.D. Tex.	September 10, 1984	April 3, 1985	April 4, 1985	March 1, 2001	September 16, 2005
132	Carolyn R. Dimmick	W.D. Wash.	March 7, 1985	April 3, 1985	April 4, 1985	November 1, 1997	December 24, 2025
133	John Thomas Greene Jr.	D. Utah	March 7, 1985	April 3, 1985	April 4, 1985	November 28, 1997	February 11, 2011
134	James F. Holderman	N.D. Ill.	September 6, 1984 (Note: Renominated on February 25, 1985.)	April 3, 1985	April 4, 1985	December 31, 2013	June 1, 2015
135	George La Plata	E.D. Mich.	September 11, 1984	April 3, 1985	April 4, 1985	August 3, 1996	–
136	Charles C. Lovell	D. Mont.	March 27, 1985	April 3, 1985	April 4, 1985	June 14, 2000	June 14, 2023
137	Ronald Edward Meredith	W.D. Ky.	September 11, 1984	April 3, 1985	April 4, 1985	December 1, 1994	–
138	Herman Jacob Weber	S.D. Ohio	September 17, 1984	April 3, 1985	April 4, 1985	January 1, 2002	Incumbent
139	Ann Claire Williams	N.D. Ill.	October 5, 1984 (Note: Renominated on March 13, 1985.)	April 3, 1985	April 4, 1985	November 17, 1999	Elevated
140	Mark L. Wolf	D. Mass.	October 5, 1984 (Note: Renominated on March 8, 1985.)	April 3, 1985	April 4, 1985	January 1, 2013	November 7, 2025
141	William G. Young	D. Mass	September 11, 1984	April 3, 1985	April 4, 1985	July 1, 2021	Incumbent
142	Robert Allan Edgar	E.D. Tenn.	September 11, 1984	April 15, 1985	April 16, 1985	October 7, 2005	Incumbent
143	George F. Gunn Jr.	E.D. Mo.	April 17, 1985	May 3, 1985	May 10, 1985	December 1, 1996	May 20, 1998
144	Sam B. Hall Jr.	E.D. Tex.	April 17, 1985	May 3, 1985	May 10, 1985	April 10, 1994	–
145	Joseph H. Rodriguez	D.N.J.	September 17, 1984	May 3, 1985	May 10, 1985	May 22, 1998	Incumbent
146	Wayne Alley	W.D. Okla.	May 29, 1985	July 10, 1985	July 11, 1985	May 16, 1999	Incumbent
147	Robert C. Broomfield	D. Ariz.	May 15, 1985	July 10, 1985	July 11, 1985	August 12, 1999	July 10, 2014
148	Claude M. Hilton	E.D. Va.	May 15, 1985	July 10, 1985	July 11, 1985	December 31, 2005	Incumbent
149	James Dale Todd	W.D. Tenn.	June 5, 1985	July 10, 1985	July 11, 1985	May 20, 2008	Incumbent
150	Donald Ellsworth Walter	W.D. La.	October 5, 1984 (Note: Previously nominated by President Ford on August 5, 1976 to a different seat on the same court. That nomination expired at the end of the term. Renominated on October 5, 1984 to a different seat on the same court by President Reagan. That nomination expired at the end of the term. Renominated on May 15, 1985.)	July 10, 1985	July 11, 1985	November 30, 2001	Incumbent
151	J. Frederick Motz	D. Md.	April 23, 1985	July 11, 1985	July 12, 1985	December 17, 2010	October 23, 2023
152	Joseph James Farnan Jr.	D. Del.	June 21, 1985	July 16, 1985	July 18, 1985	July 31, 2010	–
153	Stanley Marcus	S.D. Fla.	June 20, 1985	July 16, 1985	July 18, 1985	November 23, 1997	Elevated
154	James M. Rosenbaum	D. Minn.	June 14, 1985	July 16, 1985	July 18, 1985	October 26, 2009	August 25, 2010
155	Thomas Scott	S.D. Fla.	June 20, 1985	July 16, 1985	July 18, 1985	October 31, 1990	–
156	Louis L. Stanton	S.D.N.Y.	June 12, 1985	July 16, 1985	July 18, 1985	October 1, 1996	Incumbent
157	Richard Henry Mills	C.D. Ill.	June 25, 1985	July 19, 1985	July 22, 1985	October 7, 1997	July 16, 2023
158	Roger Gordon Strand	D. Ariz.	June 25, 1985	July 19, 1985	July 22, 1985	April 28, 2000	September 7, 2017
159	John M. Walker Jr.	S.D.N.Y.	June 25, 1985	July 19, 1985	July 22, 1985	December 19, 1989	Elevated
160	David Sam	D. Utah	September 9, 1985	October 16, 1985	October 16, 1985	November 1, 1999	Incumbent
161	Paul Neeley Brown	E.D. Tex.	September 11, 1985	October 16, 1985	October 17, 1985	April 1, 2001	November 26, 2012
162	Glen H. Davidson	N.D. Miss.	July 23, 1985	October 17, 1985	October 17, 1985	June 1, 2007	Incumbent
163	Brian Barnett Duff	N.D. Ill.	August 1, 1985	October 16, 1985	October 17, 1985	October 30, 1996	February 25, 2016
164	Ferdinand Fernandez	C.D. Cal.	July 19, 1985	October 16, 1985	October 17, 1985	May 24, 1989	Elevated
165	Edmund V. Ludwig	E.D. Pa.	June 21, 1985	October 16, 1985	October 17, 1985	May 20, 1997	May 17, 2016
166	Robert B. Maloney	N.D. Tex.	July 23, 1985	October 16, 1985	October 17, 1985	August 31, 2000	Incumbent
167	Alan Angus McDonald	E.D. Wash.	September 11, 1985	October 16, 1985	October 17, 1985	December 13, 1996	July 26, 2007
168	Alan Harris Nevas	D. Conn.	September 9, 1985	October 16, 1985	October 17, 1985	March 27, 1997	February 2, 2009
169	David B. Sentelle	W.D.N.C.	July 25, 1985	October 16, 1985	October 17, 1985	October 19, 1987	Elevated
170	Stephen Victor Wilson	C.D. Cal.	September 9, 1985	October 16, 1985	October 17, 1985	Incumbent	–
171	Henry Travillion Wingate	S.D. Miss.	September 11, 1985	October 16, 1985	October 17, 1985	Incumbent	–
172	Richard Battey	D.S.D.	September 27, 1985	October 25, 1985	October 28, 1985	January 1, 1999	May 6, 2017
173	José A. Fusté	D.P.R.	September 27, 1985	October 25, 1985	October 28, 1985	June 1, 2016	–
174	John Skylstead Rhoades Sr.	S.D. Cal.	September 27, 1985	October 25, 1985	October 28, 1985	November 4, 1995	September 3, 2007
175	Lyle Elmer Strom	D. Neb.	September 27, 1985	October 25, 1985	October 28, 1985	November 2, 1995	December 1, 2023
176	Robert Cowen	D.N.J.	October 7, 1985	November 1, 1985	November 4, 1985	November 16, 1987	Elevated
177	Edward R. Korman	E.D.N.Y.	October 2, 1985	November 1, 1985	November 4, 1985	October 25, 2007	Incumbent
178	Jane Richards Roth	D. Del.	October 16, 1985	November 1, 1985	November 4, 1985	July 22, 1991	Elevated
179	William J. Zloch	S.D. Fla.	October 9, 1985	November 1, 1985	November 4, 1985	January 31, 2017	Incumbent
180	Morris S. Arnold	W.D. Ark.	October 23, 1985	December 16, 1985	December 17, 1985	June 1, 1992	Elevated
181	Garrett Brown Jr.	D.N.J.	October 23, 1985	December 16, 1985	December 17, 1985	January 2, 2012	January 26, 2012
182	Patrick Anthony Conmy	D.N.D.	October 16, 1985	December 16, 1985	December 17, 1985	January 5, 2000	October 7, 2026
183	Duross Fitzpatrick	M.D. Ga.	November 14, 1985	December 16, 1985	December 17, 1985	February 1, 2001	January 6, 2008
184	Lynn Hughes	S.D. Tex.	October 16, 1985	December 16, 1985	December 17, 1985	February 12, 2023	Incumbent
185	Alan Bond Johnson	D. Wyo.	October 22, 1985	December 16, 1985	December 17, 1985	Incumbent	–
186	Harry Leinenweber	N.D. Ill.	November 7, 1985	December 16, 1985	December 17, 1985	June 3, 2002	June 11, 2024
187	John Spencer Letts	C.D. Cal.	November 7, 1985	December 16, 1985	December 17, 1985	December 19, 2000	November 10, 2014
188	Robert Lowell Miller Jr.	N.D. Ind.	October 23, 1985	December 16, 1985	December 17, 1985	January 11, 2016	Incumbent
189	George Hughes Revercomb	D.D.C.	November 7, 1985	December 16, 1985	December 17, 1985	August 1, 1993	–
190	Stanley Sporkin	D.D.C.	June 28, 1984 (Note: Renominated on April 5, 1985.)	December 16, 1985	December 17, 1985	February 12, 1999	January 15, 2000
191	Dickran Tevrizian	C.D. Cal.	November 7, 1985	December 16, 1985	December 17, 1985	August 5, 2005	April 19, 2007
192	Walter J. Gex III	S.D. Miss.	December 4, 1985	February 25, 1986	February 26, 1986	March 24, 2004	November 12, 2020
193	Miriam Goldman Cedarbaum	S.D.N.Y.	December 4, 1985 (Note: Renominated on February 3, 1986.)	March 3, 1986	March 4, 1986	March 31, 1998	February 5, 2016
194	David R. Hansen	N.D. Iowa	December 4, 1985	March 3, 1986	March 4, 1986	November 18, 1991	Elevated
195	Ronald Rene Lagueux	D.R.I.	January 21, 1986	March 3, 1986	March 4, 1986	November 30, 2001	May 3, 2023
196	Thomas James McAvoy	N.D.N.Y.	October 29, 1985	March 3, 1986	March 4, 1986	September 17, 2003	Incumbent
197	Lawrence Paul Zatkoff	E.D. Mich.	January 21, 1986	March 3, 1986	March 4, 1986	June 16, 2004	January 22, 2015
198	Constantine George Cholakis	N.D.N.Y.	February 7, 1986	March 14, 1986	March 17, 1986	June 30, 1996	December 1, 1996
199	Raymond Dearie	E.D.N.Y.	February 3, 1986	March 14, 1986	March 19, 1986	April 3, 2011	Incumbent
200	Sidney A. Fitzwater	N.D. Tex.	October 29, 1985	March 18, 1986	March 19, 1986	September 22, 2018	Incumbent
201	Barbara Kloka Hackett	E.D. Mich.	February 11, 1986	March 27, 1986	April 7, 1986	April 8, 1997	March 1, 2000
202	Kenneth Ryskamp	S.D. Fla.	March 13, 1986	April 23, 1986	April 24, 1986	January 1, 2000	November 16, 2017
203	Robert Jensen Bryan	W.D. Wash.	December 4, 1985	April 24, 1986	May 7, 1986	November 1, 2000	Incumbent
204	Andrew Kleinfeld	D. Alaska	March 26, 1986	May 14, 1986	May 15, 1986	October 7, 1991	Elevated
205	John Davies	C.D. Cal.	April 22, 1986	June 6, 1986	June 9, 1986	July 18, 1998	–
206	Patricia C. Fawsett	M.D. Fla.	April 9, 1986	June 6, 1986	June 9, 1986	August 25, 2008	Incumbent
207	David Hittner	S.D. Tex.	April 22, 1986	June 6, 1986	June 9, 1986	November 11, 2004	Incumbent
208	Alfred James Lechner Jr.	D.N.J.	April 8, 1986	June 6, 1986	June 9, 1986	October 1, 2001	–
209	John Edwards Conway	D.N.M.	May 14, 1986	June 13, 1986	June 16, 1986	September 1, 2000	June 1, 2014
210	Karen L. Henderson	D.S.C.	June 3, 1986	June 13, 1986	June 16, 1986	July 11, 1990	Elevated
211	Edwin Michael Kosik	M.D. Pa.	May 14, 1986	June 13, 1986	June 16, 1986	July 15, 1996	June 13, 2019
212	William Donald Stiehl	S.D. Ill.	May 14, 1986	June 13, 1986	June 16, 1986	November 30, 1996	February 8, 2016
213	Douglas P. Woodlock	D. Mass.	April 22, 1986	June 13, 1986	June 16, 1986	June 1, 2015	Incumbent
214	D. Lowell Jensen	N.D. Cal.	June 2, 1986	June 24, 1986	June 25, 1986	June 27, 1997	October 31, 2014
215	Charles Ralph Simpson III	W.D. Ky.	June 6, 1986	August 1, 1986	August 4, 1986	February 1, 2013	Incumbent
216	Joel Fredrick Dubina	M.D. Ala.	July 30, 1986	September 12, 1986	September 15, 1986	October 5, 1990	Elevated
217	Alan Cooke Kay	D. Haw.	July 3, 1986	September 12, 1986	September 15, 1986	January 2, 2000	July 30, 2024
218	Richard B. McQuade Jr.	N.D. Ohio	July 28, 1986	September 12, 1986	September 15, 1986	September 30, 1989	–
219	James L. Graham	S.D. Ohio	August 15, 1986	September 25, 1986	September 26, 1986	August 31, 2004	Incumbent
220	Frederic N. Smalkin	D. Md.	August 15, 1986	September 25, 1986	September 26, 1986	January 8, 2003	September 1, 2011
221	Joseph F. Anderson	D.S.C.	September 26, 1986	October 8, 1986	October 14, 1986	November 16, 2014	Incumbent
222	Patrick J. Duggan	E.D. Mich.	September 11, 1986	October 8, 1986	October 14, 1986	September 29, 2000	March 18, 2020
223	Alex T. Howard Jr.	S.D. Ala.	September 23, 1986	October 8, 1986	October 14, 1986	October 21, 1996	February 10, 2011
224	James R. Spencer	E.D. Va.	September 9, 1986	October 8, 1986	October 14, 1986	March 25, 2014	June 2, 2017
225	Malcolm F. Marsh	D. Ore.	February 2, 1987	March 20, 1987	March 24, 1987	April 16, 1998	March 15, 2025
226	James Zagel	N.D. Ill.	February 2, 1987	April 21, 1987	April 22, 1987	October 21, 2016	July 15, 2023
227	Richard J. Daronco	S.D.N.Y.	February 2, 1987	May 7, 1987	May 7, 1987	May 21, 1988	–
228	Ronald S. W. Lew	C.D. Cal.	February 2, 1987	May 7, 1987	May 7, 1987	September 19, 2006	May 19, 2023
229	Reena Raggi	E.D.N.Y.	October 3, 1986 (Note: Renominated on January 20, 1987.)	May 7, 1987	May 7, 1987	October 7, 2002	Elevated
230	David S. Doty	D. Minn.	February 5, 1987	May 7, 1987	May 8, 1987	June 30, 1998	June 26, 2026
231	James Alesia	N.D. Ill.	February 2, 1987	May 19, 1987	May 20, 1987	February 1, 1998	July 24, 2003
232	Joseph Peter Stadtmueller	E.D. Wis.	March 3, 1987	May 19, 1987	June 1, 1987	Incumbent	–
233	Layn R. Phillips	W.D. Okla.	February 2, 1987	June 11, 1987	June 15, 1987	June 22, 1991	–
234	Robert F. Kelly	E.D. Pa.	May 1, 1987	June 25, 1987	June 26, 1987	July 17, 2001	Incumbent
235	Robert Holmes Bell	W.D. Mich.	March 11, 1987	July 1, 1987	July 2, 1987	January 31, 2017	June 8, 2023
236	Larry J. McKinney	S.D. Ind.	May 5, 1987	July 17, 1987	July 20, 1987	July 4, 2009	September 21, 2017
237	Philip Martin Pro	D. Nev.	May 5, 1987	July 22, 1987	July 23, 1987	December 31, 2011	January 23, 2015
238	T. S. Ellis III	E.D. Va.	July 1, 1987	August 5, 1987	August 6, 1987	April 1, 2007	July 30, 2025
239	Charles R. Wolle	S.D. Iowa	July 1, 1987	August 5, 1987	August 6, 1987	October 16, 2001	December 6, 2022
240	John Daniel Tinder	S.D. Ind.	June 2, 1987	August 7, 1987	August 10, 1987	December 21, 2007	Elevated
241	William Lee Dwyer	W.D. Wash.	September 26, 1986 (Note: Renominated on July 28, 1987.)	November 5, 1987	November 6, 1987	December 1, 1998	February 12, 2002
242	David G. Larimer	W.D.N.Y.	May 5, 1987	November 5, 1987	November 6, 1987	March 3, 2009	Incumbent
243	James Aubrey Parker	D.N.M.	July 10, 1987	November 5, 1987	November 6, 1987	September 1, 2003	September 16, 2022
244	William Lloyd Standish	W.D. Pa.	July 1, 1987	November 5, 1987	November 6, 1987	March 1, 2002	January 1, 2015
245	Ernest C. Torres	D.R.I.	June 22, 1987	November 5, 1987	November 6, 1987	December 1, 2006	June 1, 2011
246	Michael Mukasey	S.D.N.Y.	July 27, 1987	November 6, 1987	November 9, 1987	August 1, 2006	September 9, 2006
247	Nicholas H. Politan	D.N.J.	August 7, 1987	November 6, 1987	November 9, 1987	January 4, 2002	–
248	George Curtis Smith	S.D. Ohio	July 1, 1987	November 6, 1987	November 9, 1987	January 1, 2002	April 15, 2020
249	Royce Lamberth	D.D.C.	March 19, 1987	November 13, 1987	November 16, 1987	July 15, 2013	Incumbent
250	Samuel Ray Cummings	N.D. Tex.	July 31, 1987	December 8, 1987	December 9, 1987	December 31, 2014	Incumbent
251	Robert S. Gawthrop III	E.D. Pa.	September 30, 1987	December 8, 1987	December 9, 1987	August 1, 1999	–
252	Jerome Turner	W.D. Tenn.	July 1, 1987	December 8, 1987	December 9, 1987	February 12, 2000	–
253	Franklin Van Antwerpen	E.D. Pa.	September 11, 1987	December 8, 1987	December 9, 1987	June 1, 2004	Elevated
254	Dean Whipple	W.D. Mo.	September 14, 1987	December 8, 1987	December 9, 1987	April 30, 2007	Incumbent
255	Alfred M. Wolin	D.N.J.	September 14, 1987	December 8, 1987	December 9, 1987	September 18, 2000	June 30, 2004
256	Kenneth Conboy	S.D.N.Y.	November 5, 1987	December 19, 1987	December 21, 1987	December 31, 1993	–
257	Rodney Scott Webb	D.N.D.	May 5, 1987	December 19, 1987	December 21, 1987	December 31, 2001	August 9, 2009
258	Richard Arcara	W.D.N.Y.	August 7, 1987	February 19, 1988	February 22, 1988	January 3, 2015	Incumbent
259	Suzanne B. Conlon	N.D. Ill.	April 2, 1987	February 19, 1988	February 22, 1988	April 17, 2004	Incumbent
260	Edward F. Harrington	D. Mass.	September 18, 1987	February 19, 1988	February 22, 1988	March 1, 2001	March 7, 2025
261	Paul V. Niemeyer	D. Md.	September 11, 1987	February 19, 1988	February 22, 1988	August 10, 1990	Elevated
262	Malcolm Jones Howard	E.D.N.C.	September 10, 1987	February 25, 1988	February 26, 1988	December 31, 2005	January 15, 2025
263	Rodolfo Lozano	N.D. Ind.	December 4, 1987	February 25, 1988	February 26, 1988	July 10, 2007	July 11, 2018
264	Stephen M. Reasoner	E.D. Ark.	December 19, 1987	February 25, 1988	February 26, 1988	September 17, 2002	August 14, 2004
265	Kenneth M. Hoyt	S.D. Tex.	November 24, 1987	March 31, 1988	April 1, 1988	March 2, 2013	Incumbent
266	George M. Marovich	N.D. Ill.	February 2, 1988	March 31, 1988	April 1, 1988	January 2, 2000	Incumbent
267	Jack Tarpley Camp Jr.	N.D. Ga.	December 18, 1987	April 19, 1988	April 20, 1988	December 31, 2008	November 19, 2010
268	Bernard A. Friedman	E.D. Mich.	February 2, 1988	April 19, 1988	April 20, 1988	January 1, 2009	Incumbent
269	Emilio M. Garza	W.D. Tex.	February 2, 1988	April 19, 1988	April 20, 1988	June 7, 1991	Elevated
270	Lowell A. Reed Jr.	E.D. Pa.	December 18, 1987	April 19, 1988	April 20, 1988	June 21, 1999	April 11, 2020
271	Kimba Wood	S.D.N.Y.	December 18, 1987	April 19, 1988	April 20, 1988	June 1, 2009	Incumbent
272	Thomas Samuel Zilly	W.D. Wash.	February 16, 1988	April 19, 1988	April 20, 1988	January 1, 2004	Incumbent
273	David Alan Ezra	D. Haw.	November 18, 1987	May 19, 1988	May 20, 1988	June 27, 2012	Incumbent
274	John C. Lifland	D.N.J.	February 29, 1988	May 19, 1988	May 20, 1988	June 15, 2001	May 31, 2007
275	William G. Cambridge	D. Neb.	April 13, 1988	May 27, 1988	June 6, 1988	July 11, 2000	–
276	Richard A. Schell	E.D. Tex.	April 13, 1988	May 27, 1988	June 6, 1988	March 10, 2015	Incumbent
277	Jan E. DuBois	E.D. Pa.	May 10, 1988	July 26, 1988	July 27, 1988	April 15, 2002	May 10, 2026
278	Karl Spillman Forester	E.D. Ky.	March 30, 1988	July 26, 1988	July 27, 1988	May 2, 2005	March 29, 2014
279	Fern M. Smith	N.D. Cal.	May 9, 1988	July 26, 1988	July 27, 1988	May 15, 2003	June 30, 2005
280	Herbert J. Hutton	E.D. Pa.	May 17, 1988	August 11, 1988	August 12, 1988	September 6, 2003	April 8, 2007
281	Sim Lake	S.D. Tex.	March 30, 1988	August 11, 1988	August 12, 1988	July 5, 2019	Incumbent
282	Robert P. Patterson Jr.	S.D.N.Y.	June 14, 1988	October 5, 1988	October 6, 1988	December 31, 1998	April 21, 2015
283	Lewis Babcock	D. Colo.	June 23, 1988	October 14, 1988	October 17, 1988	April 4, 2008	Incumbent
284	Charles R. Butler Jr.	S.D. Ala.	April 28, 1988	October 14, 1988	October 17, 1988	March 28, 2005	Incumbent
285	Paul V. Gadola	E.D. Mich.	April 23, 1987	October 14, 1988	October 17, 1988	January 31, 2001	December 26, 2014
286	Robert Leon Jordan	E.D. Tenn.	July 25, 1988	October 14, 1988	October 17, 1988	November 30, 2001	February 27, 2024
287	D. Brooks Smith	W.D. Pa.	July 28, 1988	October 14, 1988	October 17, 1988	September 23, 2002	Elevated
288	Norwood Carlton Tilley Jr.	M.D.N.C.	April 26, 1988	October 14, 1988	October 17, 1988	December 16, 2008	Incumbent
289	Richard Lesley Voorhees	W.D.N.C.	July 31, 1987	October 14, 1988	October 17, 1988	August 31, 2017	Incumbent
290	Jay Waldman	E.D. Pa.	August 3, 1988	October 14, 1988	October 17, 1988	May 30, 2003	–

== United States Court of International Trade ==
#	Judge	Nomination date	Confirmation date	Began active service	Ended active service	Ended senior status
1	Gregory W. Carman	January 31, 1983	March 2, 1983	March 2, 1983	September 15, 2014	April 5, 2020
2	Jane A. Restani	November 3, 1983	November 15, 1983	November 16, 1983	March 1, 2015	Incumbent
3	Dominick L. DiCarlo	May 25, 1984	June 8, 1984	June 11, 1984	October 31, 1996	April 27, 1999
4	Thomas J. Aquilino	August 1, 1984	April 3, 1985	April 4, 1985	December 10, 2004	Incumbent
5	Nicholas Tsoucalas	September 11, 1985	June 6, 1986	June 9, 1986	September 30, 1996	March 22, 2018
6	R. Kenton Musgrave	July 1, 1987	November 6, 1987	November 9, 1987	November 14, 1997	March 14, 2023

== Specialty courts (Article I) ==
=== United States Court of Federal Claims ===
#	Judge	Began active service	Ended active service	Ended senior status
1	Alex Kozinski	October 1, 1982	February 9, 1985	–
2	Mastin G. White	October 1, 1982	November 19, 1982	July 25, 1987
3	Robert J. Yock	October 1, 1982	August 4, 1998	Incumbent
4	John Paul Wiese	October 14, 1982	October 13, 2001	Incumbent
5	Reginald W. Gibson	December 10, 1982	August 15, 1995	December 9, 2018
6	Lawrence S. Margolis	December 10, 1982	December 14, 1997	January 18, 2017
7	Haldane Robert Mayer	December 10, 1982	June 19, 1987	Elevated
8	Christine Odell Cook Miller	December 10, 1982	February 4, 2013	March 1, 2013
9	Moody R. Tidwell III	May 17, 1983	May 16, 1998	Incumbent
10	Loren A. Smith	July 11, 1985	July 10, 2000	Incumbent
11	Marian Blank Horn	April 14, 1986	April 13, 2001	March 10, 2003
12	Eric G. Bruggink	April 16, 1986	April 16, 2001	Incumbent
13	John Light Napier	October 14, 1986	July 31, 1989	–
14	Wilkes C. Robinson	May 7, 1987	July 31, 1997	May 11, 2015
15	Bohdan A. Futey	May 7, 1987	May 6, 2003	Incumbent
16	Roger Andewelt	May 20, 1987	August 7, 2001	–
17	James T. Turner	July 2, 1987	July 2, 2002	Incumbent
18	Randall Ray Rader	August 12, 1988	August 14, 1990	Elevated

== Notes ==
Renominations

== Sources ==
- Federal Judicial Center
