= United States Attorney for the Eastern District of Tennessee =

The United States attorney for the Eastern District of Tennessee is the chief federal law enforcement officer in forty-one Tennessee counties. The U.S. District Court for the Eastern District of Tennessee has jurisdiction over all cases prosecuted by the U.S. attorney. Francis M. (Trey) Hamilton III is the current U.S. attorney for the District.

== Organization ==
The office is headquartered in Knoxville, and maintains staffed offices in Greeneville and Chattanooga, and an unstaffed office in Winchester.

The Knoxville Division handles cases from fourteen counties: Anderson, Blount, Campbell, Claiborne, Grainger, Jefferson, Knox, Loudon, Monroe, Morgan, Roane, Scott, Sevier, and Union.

The Chattanooga Division handles cases from nine counties: Bledsoe, Bradley, Hamilton, McMinn, Marion, Meigs, Polk, Rhea, and Sequatchie.

The Winchester Division handles cases from eight counties: Bedford, Coffee, Franklin, Grundy, Lincoln, Moore, Van Buren, and Warren.

The Greeneville Division handles cases from ten counties: Carter, Cocke, Greene, Hamblen, Hancock, Hawkins, Johnson, Sullivan, Unicoi, and Washington.

== List of U.S. attorneys for the Eastern District of Tennessee ==
- Edward Scott, 1805–1807
- James Temble, 1807–1808
- Hugh Lawson White, 1808–1809
- James Temble, 1809–1810
- John McCampbell, 1810–1821
- Pryor Lea, 1821–1828
- John A. McKinney, 1828–1840
- George W. Churchill, 1840–1843
- Crawford W. Hall, 1843–1844
- Thomas C. Lyon, 1844–1850
- Samuel R. Rodgers, 1850–1853
- J. C. Ramsey, 1853
- Richard J. Hays, 1853–1857
- J. C. Ramsey, 1857–1861
- John L. Hopkins, 1861
- John M. Fleming, 1861
- E. C. Camp, 1869–1876
- George Andrews, 1876–1879
- Xenophon Wheeler, 1879–1883
- James M. Meek, 1883–1885
- James C. J. Williams, 1885–1889
- Hugh B. Lindsay, 1889–1893
- James H. Bible, 1893–1897
- James E. Mayfield, 1897
- William D. Wright, 1897–1905
- James R. Penland, 1905–1910
- James B. Cox, 1910–1913
- Lewis M. Coleman, 1913–1917
- Wesley T. Kennerly, 1917–1921
- George C. Taylor, 1921–1928
- Everett Greer, 1928–1930
- William J. Carter, 1930–1933
- James B. Frazier Jr., 1933–1948
- Otto T. Ault, 1948–1953
- John H. Reddy, 1953
- John C. Crawford Jr., 1953–1961
- John H. Reddy, 1961–1969
- Robert E. Simpson, 1969
- John L. Bowers Jr., 1969–1977
- Robert E. Simpson, 1977
- John H. Cary, 1977–1981
- William T. Dillard, 1981
- John W. Gill Jr., 1981–1991
- Jerry G. Cunningham, 1991–1993
- David G. Dake, 1993
- Guy W. Blackwell, 1993
- Carl K. Kirkpatrick, 1993–2001
- James R. Dedrick, 2001
- Harry Sandlin Mattice Jr., 2001–2005
- James R. Dedrick, 2005–2010
- Greg Sullivan, 2010
- William C. Killian, 2010-2015
- Nancy Stallard Harr, 2016-2017
- Doug Overbey, 2017-2021
- Francis "Trey" Hamilton III, 2021-Present

== See also ==
- United States Attorney for the District of Tennessee
