= Tennessee's 2nd Senate district =

American legislative district

Tennessee's 2nd State Senate district
Senator
Tom Hatcher; R–Maryville
- Demographics: 90% White; 2% Black; 4% Hispanic; 1% Asian; 3% Multiracial
- Population (2022): 204,455

Tennessee's 2nd Senate district is one of 33 districts in the Tennessee Senate. It has been represented by Republican Tom Hatcher since 2024.

It was previously held by Art Swann since his 2017 appointment to replace fellow Republican Doug Overbey.

== Geography ==
District 2 lies to the southeast of Knoxville, covering all of Blount County, Monroe County, Polk County, and a small portion of Bradley County. Communities in the district include Maryville, Madisonville, and Sweetwater.

The district is split between Tennessee's 2nd and 3rd congressional districts, and overlaps with the 8th, 20th, 21st, 22nd, and 23rd districts of the Tennessee House of Representatives. The district borders the states of North Carolina and Georgia.

== Recent election results ==
Tennessee Senators are elected to staggered four-year terms, with odd-numbered districts holding elections in midterm years and even-numbered districts holding elections in presidential years.

=== 2024 ===
Tennessee's 2nd Senate district general election, 2024
Party	Candidate	Votes	%
Republican	Tom Hatcher	78,351	78.77%
Democratic	Patti Young	21,111	21.23%
Total votes		99,462	100.00%

=== 2020 ===
2020 Tennessee Senate election, District 2
Party	Candidate	Votes	%
Republican	Art Swann (incumbent)	79,674	97.8
Total votes		81,448	100
Republican hold			

=== 2018 ===
Following Republican Doug Overbey's appointment as U.S. Attorney for the Eastern District of Tennessee in 2017, fellow Republican Art Swann was appointed to replace him. Per Tennessee state law, Swann had to run in an off-cycle election in 2018 to retain the seat for the remainder of Overbey's term.

2018 Tennessee Senate election, District 2
Primary election
Party	Candidate	Votes	%
Republican	Art Swann (incumbent)	13,824	56.5
Republican	Scott Williams	6,836	28.0
Republican	Wesley Maples	3,792	15.5
Total votes		24,452	100
General election
Republican	Art Swann (incumbent)	55,595	99.3
Total votes		55,997	100
Republican hold			

=== 2016 ===
2016 Tennessee Senate election, District 2
Primary election
Party	Candidate	Votes	%
Republican	Doug Overbey (incumbent)	8,126	61.2
Republican	Scott Williams	5,155	38.8
Total votes		13,281	100
General election
Republican	Doug Overbey (incumbent)	66,262	100
Total votes		66,262	100
Republican hold			

=== 2012 ===
2012 Tennessee Senate election, District 2
Primary election
Party	Candidate	Votes	%
Republican	Doug Overbey (incumbent)	11,334	61.0
Republican	Scott Hughes	7,260	39.0
Total votes		18,594	100
General election
Republican	Doug Overbey (incumbent)	60,517	100
Total votes		60,517	100
Republican hold			

=== Federal and statewide results ===
Year	Office	Results
2020	President	Trump 73.2 - 24.8%
2020	Senate	Hagerty 79.5 - 18.2%
2016	President	Trump 75.1 – 22.8%
2012	President	Romney 73.6 – 24.8%
2012	Senate	Corker 77.9 – 17.2%
