= Robert Edgar =

Robert Edgar may refer to:

- Robert Allan Edgar (born 1940), U.S. federal judge
- Robert Stuart Edgar (1930–2016), geneticist
- Bob Edgar (Robert William Edgar, 1943–2013), U.S. representative from Pennsylvania
