= Tom Hatcher (politician) =

American politician (born 1958)

Member of the Tennessee Senate from the 2nd district
- Incumbent
- Assumed office January 14, 2025
- Preceded by: Art Swann

Personal details
- Born: May 20, 1958 (age 68)
- Party: Republican
- Spouse: Donna
- Children: 1
- Education: Roane State Community College
- Website: House website Campaign website

Tom Hatcher (born May 20, 1958) is an American politician. He has served as a Republican member in the Tennessee State Senate since 2025, representing the 2nd district.

== Early life, education, and career ==
Tom Hatcher was born on May 20, 1958. He attended Roane State Community College. From 1994 to 2024, Hatcher was the circuit court clerk for Blount County.

== Tennessee Senate (2025–present) ==
=== Elections ===
On August 8, 2023, Hatcher announced his candidacy for the Tennessee State Senate's 2nd district, held by retiring senator Art Swann. He faced state representative Bryan Richey in the Republican primary. Hatcher's campaign benefited from over half a million dollars in independent spending, primarily from the School Freedom Fund, a pro-voucher organization. In August 2024, Hatcher defeated Richey, winning 74 percent of the vote. He later won the general election in November.

=== Tenure ===
In May 2026, the state of Tennessee tried and failed to execute Tony Von Carruthers after medical personnel were unable to establish a backup IV line. In response, Hatcher wrote a letter to Governor Bill Lee, signed by several other senators, calling for an independent review of the failed execution and calling the "incompetent administration" of the death penalty unacceptable.

== Personal life ==
Hatcher is married to his wife Donna, with whom he has one child. He is a Baptist.
