= James Howard Jarvis II =

American judge

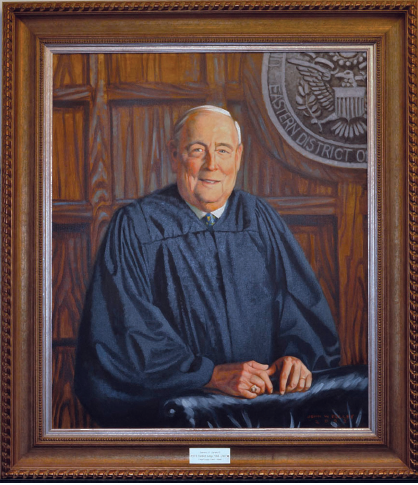

Senior Judge of the United States District Court for the Eastern District of Tennessee
- In office February 28, 2002 – June 6, 2007

Chief Judge of the United States District Court for the Eastern District of Tennessee
- In office 1991–1998
- Preceded by: Thomas Gray Hull
- Succeeded by: Robert Allan Edgar

Judge of the United States District Court for the Eastern District of Tennessee
- In office October 12, 1984 – February 28, 2002
- Appointed by: Ronald Reagan
- Preceded by: Seat established by 98 Stat. 333
- Succeeded by: Thomas W. Phillips

Personal details
- Born: James Howard Jarvis II; February 28, 1937 Knoxville, Tennessee, U.S.
- Died: June 6, 2007 (aged 70) Knoxville, Tennessee, U.S.
- Education: University of Tennessee (BA, JD)

James Howard Jarvis II (February 28, 1937 – June 6, 2007) was an American attorney and jurist who served as a United States district judge of the United States District Court for the Eastern District of Tennessee.

== Early life and education ==
Born in Knoxville, Tennessee, Jarvis received a Bachelor of Arts degree from the University of Tennessee in 1958, where he was a member of Sigma Chi fraternity; he was awarded the Significant Sig Award in 1997 for "achievement in a brother’s professional career and civic endeavors". He received a Juris Doctor from the University of Tennessee College of Law in 1960.

== Career ==
He was in private practice in Knoxville from 1960 to 1968. He was in private practice in Maryville, Tennessee from 1968 to 1972. He was a judge on the Law and Equity Court, Blount County, Tennessee from 1972 to 1977. He was a judge on the 30th Judicial Circuit Court, Blount County from 1977 to 1984.

=== Federal judicial service ===
Jarvis was nominated by President Ronald Reagan on September 6, 1984, to the United States District Court for the Eastern District of Tennessee, to a new seat created by 98 Stat. 333. He was confirmed by the United States Senate on October 11, 1984, and received his commission on October 12, 1984. He served as Chief Judge from 1991 to 1998. He assumed senior status on February 28, 2002. Jarvis served in that capacity until his death on June 6, 2007, in Knoxville.

== Sources ==
Legal offices
Preceded by Seat established by 98 Stat. 333	Judge of the United States District Court for the Eastern District of Tennessee; 1984–2002	Succeeded by Thomas W. Phillips
Preceded by Thomas Gray Hull	Chief Judge of the United States District Court for the Eastern District of Tennessee; 1991–1998	Succeeded by Robert Allan Edgar
