= Thomas W. Phillips (judge) =

American judge (born 1943)

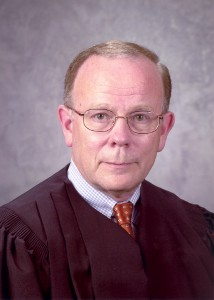

Senior Judge of the United States District Court for the Eastern District of Tennessee
- Incumbent
- Assumed office August 1, 2013

Judge of the United States District Court for the Eastern District of Tennessee
- In office November 15, 2002 – August 1, 2013
- Appointed by: George W. Bush
- Preceded by: James Howard Jarvis II
- Succeeded by: Pamela L. Reeves

Magistrate Judge of the United States District Court for the Eastern District of Tennessee
- In office 1991–2002

Personal details
- Born: July 6, 1943 (age 82) Oneida, Tennessee, U.S.
- Education: Berea College (BA); Vanderbilt University Law School (JD); George Washington University Law School (LLM)

Thomas Wade Phillips (born July 6, 1943) is a senior United States district judge of the United States District Court for the Eastern District of Tennessee.

== Education and career ==
Born in Oneida, Tennessee, Phillips received a Bachelor of Arts degree from Berea College in 1965, a Juris Doctor from Vanderbilt University Law School in 1969, and a Master of Laws from George Washington University Law School in 1973. He was in the United States Army Judge Advocate General's Corps from 1969 to 1973 and became a captain. He was in private practice in Oneida and Knoxville, Tennessee, from 1973 to 1991. He was a County attorney (part-time), Scott County, Tennessee, from 1976 to 1991. He was then a United States magistrate judge for the Eastern District of Tennessee from 1991 to 2002.

== District court service ==
On June 26, 2002, Phillips was nominated by President George W. Bush to a seat on the United States District Court for the Eastern District of Tennessee vacated by James Howard Jarvis II. Phillips was confirmed by the United States Senate on November 14, 2002, and received his commission on November 15, 2002. He took senior status on August 1, 2013, and was succeeded by Judge Pamela L. Reeves.

== Sources ==
Legal offices
Preceded by James Howard Jarvis II	Judge of the United States District Court for the Eastern District of Tennessee; 2002–2013	Succeeded by Pamela L. Reeves
