= Katherine A. Crytzer =

American judge (born 1984)

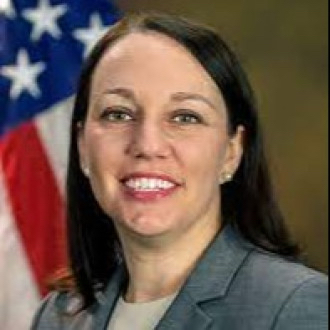

Judge of the United States District Court for the Eastern District of Tennessee
- Incumbent
- Assumed office December 22, 2020
- Appointed by: Donald Trump
- Preceded by: Pamela L. Reeves

Personal details
- Born: 1984 (age 41–42) Texarkana, Texas, U.S.
- Education: Middle Tennessee State University (BS); George Mason University (JD)

Katherine Amber "Katie" Crytzer (born 1984) is a United States district judge of the United States District Court for the Eastern District of Tennessee.

== Education ==
Crytzer graduated from Middle Tennessee State University in 2006 with a Bachelor of Science summa cum laude. She then attended the George Mason University School of Law (now Antonin Scalia Law School), graduating in 2009 with a Juris Doctor magna cum laude.

== Legal career ==
Upon graduating from law school, Crytzer served as a law clerk to Judge Raymond W. Gruender of the United States Court of Appeals for the Eighth Circuit. She previously served as an Assistant United States Attorney for the Eastern District of Kentucky and was in private practice at Kirkland & Ellis. Before becoming a judge, she was the Principal Deputy Assistant Attorney General for the United States Department of Justice Office of Legal Policy, where she provided legal and policy advice to the Assistant Attorney General and Department of Justice leadership.

== Withdrawn nomination to Tennessee Valley Authority ==
On April 3, 2020, President Donald Trump announced his intent to nominate Crytzer to be the Inspector General of the Tennessee Valley Authority. On April 6, 2020, her nomination was sent to the Senate. She was nominated to replace Richard W. Moore, who resigned to become the United States Attorney for the Southern District of Alabama in 2017. On September 22, 2020, her nomination was withdrawn after she was nominated to become a United States district judge of the United States District Court for the Eastern District of Tennessee.

== Federal judicial service ==
On September 16, 2020, President Donald Trump announced his intent to nominate Crytzer to serve as a United States district judge of the United States District Court for the Eastern District of Tennessee. On September 22, 2020, her nomination was sent to the Senate. President Trump nominated Crytzer to the seat vacated by Judge Pamela L. Reeves, who died on September 10, 2020. On November 18, 2020, a hearing on her nomination was held before the Senate Judiciary Committee. On December 10, 2020, her nomination was reported out of committee by a 12–10 vote. On December 15, 2020, the United States Senate invoked cloture on her nomination by a 48–47 vote. On December 16, 2020, her nomination was confirmed by a 48–47 vote. She received her judicial commission on December 22, 2020.

In 2025, President Trump considered nominating Crytzer for a vacancy on the United States Court of Appeals for the Sixth Circuit. He ultimately nominated Whitney Hermandorfer on May 2, 2025.

Legal offices
Preceded by Pamela L. Reeves	Judge of the United States District Court for the Eastern District of Tennessee; 2020–present	Incumbent
