= Art Swann =

American politician (born 1952)

Member of the Tennessee Senate from the 2nd district
- In office December 1, 2017 – January 14, 2025
- Preceded by: Doug Overbey
- Succeeded by: Tom Hatcher

Member of the Tennessee House of Representatives
- In office January 12, 2011 – December 1, 2017
- Preceded by: Joe McCord
- Succeeded by: Jerome Moon
- Constituency: 8th district
- In office January 8, 1985 – January 10, 1989
- Preceded by: Townsend Anderson
- Succeeded by: Townsend Anderson
- Constituency: 20th district

Personal details
- Born: Arthur Morton Swann; October 17, 1952 (age 74) Blount County, Tennessee, U.S.
- Party: Republican
- Spouse: Janet Caldwell
- Education: University of Tennessee at Martin (BS)
- Website: House website Senate website

Arthur Morton Swann (born October 17, 1952) is an American politician who served as a Republican member of the Tennessee Senate, representing the 2nd district from 2017 to 2025. Prior to being appointed to the state senate to replace Doug Overbey, Swann served in the Tennessee House of Representatives, representing the 8th District both Blount County and part of Sevier County in East Tennessee.

Swann was one of twenty-four members of the Tennessee Senate Republican Caucus who signed a letter in support of President Donald Trump's effort to contest the results of the 2020 U.S. presidential election. This letter signed by Swann "cites "irregularities" in Michigan, Georgia, Nevada and Pennsylvania" despite international observers from the Organization of American States stating that OAS observers witnessed no instances of fraud or voting irregularities in the 2020 U.S. presidential election.

Swann is a former director of the Metropolitan Knoxville Airport Authority and was formerly elected as a Blount County Commissioner from 1978 to 1982.

On January 9, 2024, Swann announced that he would retire from the Senate, and not seek re-election.

== Biography ==
Arthur Morton Swann was born on October 17, 1952, to his mother, Sue Morton Swann, and his father Eugene Swann, and has one brother, Joseph Alexander Swann.

Swann graduated from Maryville High School in Maryville, Tennessee, and later earned a Bachelor of Science in political science and history from the University of Tennessee at Martin in 1975.

Swann is married to Janet Caldwell Swann, and an Episcopalian. Swann formerly worker as the president/owner of Cherokee Lumber Company and sold real estate as an Affiliate Broker (Tennessee License ID 297722).
