= Charles E. Atchley Jr. =

American judge (born 1966)

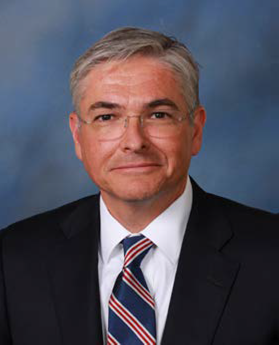

Judge of the United States District Court for the Eastern District of Tennessee
- Incumbent
- Assumed office December 22, 2020
- Appointed by: Donald Trump
- Preceded by: Harry Sandlin Mattice Jr.

Personal details
- Born: November 19, 1966 (age 59) Knoxville, Tennessee, U.S.
- Education: University of Tennessee (BA); Samford University (JD)

Charles Edward Atchley Jr. (born November 19, 1966) is an American lawyer and jurist serving as a United States district judge of the United States District Court for the Eastern District of Tennessee.

== Education ==
Atchley earned his Bachelor of Arts from the University of Tennessee and his Juris Doctor from the Cumberland School of Law.

== Career ==
Atchley began his career as a staff attorney with Family Inns of America, before working as an associate with Scott & Associates. From 1994 to 2001, Atchley served as an assistant district attorney general for Tennessee. He became an assistant United States attorney for the Eastern District of Tennessee in 2001 and served in the Criminal Division, supervising the General Crimes and National Security Section. From 2018 to 2020, Atchley was the first assistant United States attorney for the Eastern District of Tennessee. He left the Department of Justice after being appointed to the bench.

=== Prominent cases ===
- In 2005, Atchley was the lead prosecutor in the case of Lester Eugene Siler, a suspected drug dealer who was tortured by five Campbell County police officers. He won convictions and the officers received sentences of four to six years.
- In 2016, Atchley prosecuted Tennessee state Representative Joe E. Armstrong for tax fraud, winning a conviction.
- In 2017, he was the lead prosecutor in the case of Szuhsiung Ho, who was accused of trying to recruit American nuclear experts to spy on American nuclear facilities, resulting in a 2017 plea bargain in which Ho was sentenced to two years in prison.

=== Federal judicial service ===
On September 16, 2020, President Donald Trump announced his intent to nominate Atchley to serve as a United States district judge of the United States District Court for the Eastern District of Tennessee. On September 22, 2020, his nomination was sent to the Senate. President Trump nominated Atchley to the seat vacated by Judge Harry Sandlin Mattice Jr., who assumed senior status on March 10, 2020. On November 18, 2020, a hearing on his nomination was held before the Senate Judiciary Committee. On December 10, 2020, his nomination was reported out of committee by a 13–9 vote. On December 16, 2020, the United States Senate invoked cloture on his nomination by a 54–41 vote. On December 17, 2020, his nomination was confirmed by a 54–41 vote. He received his judicial commission on December 22, 2020.

In July 2022, he temporarily barred the Biden administration's Title IX guidance that interpreted Title IX's protections as extending to trans people in 20 states, claiming they infringe on state rights.

Legal offices
Preceded by Harry Sandlin Mattice Jr.	Judge of the United States District Court for the Eastern District of Tennessee; 2020–present	Incumbent
