= Travis R. McDonough =

American judge (born 1972)

Travis McDonough
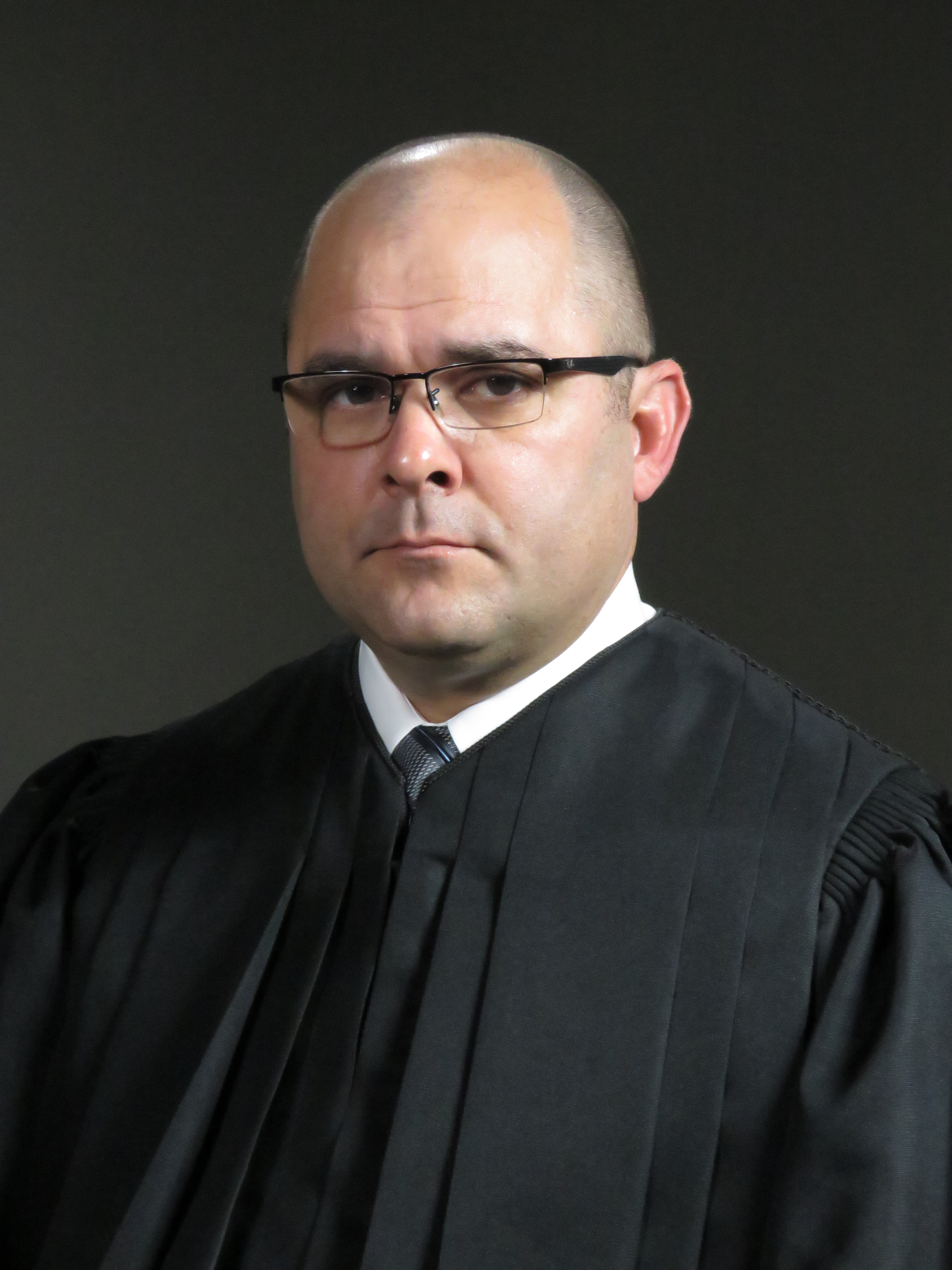

Chief Judge of the United States District Court for the Eastern District of Tennessee
- Incumbent
- Assumed office September 10, 2020
- Preceded by: Pamela L. Reeves

Judge of the United States District Court for the Eastern District of Tennessee
- Incumbent
- Assumed office December 10, 2015
- Appointed by: Barack Obama
- Preceded by: Curtis Lynn Collier

Personal details
- Born: Travis Randall McDonough; 1972 (age 52–53) Chattanooga, Tennessee, U.S.
- Education: University of the South (BA); Vanderbilt University (JD)

Travis Randall McDonough (born 1972) is the chief United States district judge of the United States District Court for the Eastern District of Tennessee and former chief of staff and counselor to the mayor of Chattanooga, Tennessee.

== Biography ==
McDonough was raised in Powell's Crossroads in Marion County, Tennessee, and graduated from Whitwell High School. He received a Bachelor of Arts degree in 1994 from Sewanee: The University of the South where he was named a Harry S Truman scholar. He received a Juris Doctor in 1997 from Vanderbilt University Law School. He served as an associate at the Chattanooga law firm of Miller & Martin from 1997 to 2004 and as a partner at that firm from 2005 to 2013, additionally serving as head of the firm's litigation department from 2012 to 2013. During his service at that firm he litigated a wide variety of civil and criminal matters in Federal and State courts. From 2013 to 2015 he served as chief of staff and counselor to the Chattanooga Mayor Andy Berke.

=== Federal judicial service ===
On November 20, 2014, President Barack Obama nominated McDonough to serve as a United States district judge of the United States District Court for the Eastern District of Tennessee, to the seat vacated by Judge Curtis Lynn Collier, who assumed senior status on October 31, 2014. On December 16, 2014, his nomination was returned to the President due to the sine die adjournment of the 113th Congress. On January 7, 2015, President Obama renominated him to the same position. He received a hearing before the Senate Judiciary Committee on June 10, 2015. On July 9, 2015, his nomination was reported out of committee by a voice vote. On December 7, 2015, the United States Senate confirmed his nomination by a 89–0 vote. He received his judicial commission on December 10, 2015. He became chief judge on September 10, 2020, following the death of Pamela L. Reeves.

Legal offices
Preceded by Curtis Lynn Collier	Judge of the United States District Court for the Eastern District of Tennessee; 2015–present	Incumbent
Preceded by Pamela L. Reeves	Chief Judge of the United States District Court for the Eastern District of Tennessee; 2020–present	Incumbent
