= Harry Sandlin Mattice Jr. =

American judge (born 1954)

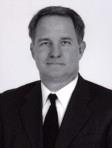

Senior Judge of the United States District Court for the Eastern District of Tennessee
- In office March 10, 2020 – September 30, 2021

Judge of the United States District Court for the Eastern District of Tennessee
- In office November 18, 2005 – March 10, 2020
- Appointed by: George W. Bush
- Preceded by: Robert Allan Edgar
- Succeeded by: Charles E. Atchley Jr.

United States Attorney for the Eastern District of Tennessee
- In office 2001–2005
- Appointed by: George W. Bush
- Preceded by: Carl Kimmel Kirkpatrick
- Succeeded by: James Russell Dedrick

Personal details
- Born: Harry Sandlin Mattice Jr. 1954 (age 71–72) Chattanooga, Tennessee
- Education: University of Tennessee (BS, JD)

Harry Sandlin Mattice Jr. (born 1954) is a former United States district judge of the United States District Court for the Eastern District of Tennessee.

== Education and career ==
Born in Chattanooga, Tennessee, Mattice received a Bachelor of Science degree from the University of Tennessee in 1976 and a Juris Doctor from the University of Tennessee College of Law in 1981. He was in private practice in Tennessee from 1981 to 2001. He was a senior counsel to the United States Senate Committee on Governmental Affairs in 1997. He was the United States Attorney for the Eastern District of Tennessee from 2001 to 2005.

== Federal judicial service ==
On July 28, 2005, Mattice was nominated by President George W. Bush to a seat on the United States District Court for the Eastern District of Tennessee vacated by Robert Allan Edgar. Mattice was confirmed by the United States Senate on October 24, 2005, and received his commission on November 18, 2005. On October 8, 2019, Mattice announced his intent to take senior status on March 10, 2020. He retired from active service on September 30, 2021.

== Sources ==
Legal offices
Preceded by Carl Kimmel Kirkpatrick	United States Attorney for the Eastern District of Tennessee; 2001–2005	Succeeded by James Russell Dedrick
Preceded by Robert Allan Edgar	Judge of the United States District Court for the Eastern District of Tennessee; 2005–2020	Succeeded by Charles E. Atchley Jr.
