= Clifton L. Corker =

American judge (born 1967)

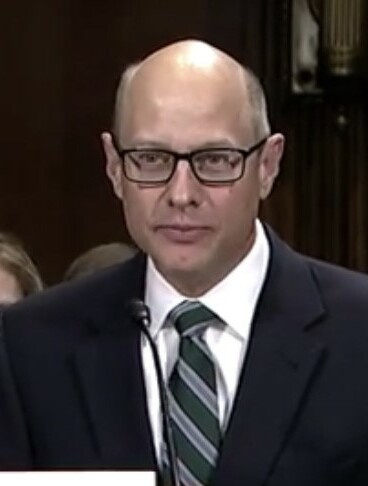

Judge of the United States District Court for the Eastern District of Tennessee
- Incumbent
- Assumed office July 22, 2019
- Appointed by: Donald Trump
- Preceded by: J. Ronnie Greer

Magistrate Judge of the United States District Court for the Eastern District of Tennessee
- In office May 1, 2015 – July 22, 2019

Personal details
- Born: 1967 (age 57–58); Richmond, Virginia, U.S.
- Education: James Madison University (BBA); College of William & Mary (JD)

Clifton Leland Corker (born 1967) is a United States district judge of the United States District Court for the Eastern District of Tennessee.

== Education ==
Corker received a Bachelor of Business Administration from James Madison University and a Juris Doctor from William & Mary Law School.

== Career ==
After graduating from law school, Corker clerked for then-Magistrate Judge Cynthia D. Kinser of the United States District Court for the Western District of Virginia. From 1994 to 1995, he was a volunteer with the Federal Public Defender's office in Greeneville. He then spent a year at Terry, Terry & Stapleton. From 1996 to 2015, Corker had a solo practice in Johnson City, before becoming a magistrate judge. There, he handled matters including complex civil litigation and capital murder cases.

== Federal judicial service ==
On April 30, 2015, Corker was appointed a United States magistrate judge of the United States District Court for the Eastern District of Tennessee. His service as a magistrate judge terminated upon appointment to the district court.

On October 10, 2018, President Donald Trump announced his intent to nominate Corker to serve as a United States District Judge of the United States District Court for the Eastern District of Tennessee. On November 13, 2018, his nomination was sent to the Senate. President Trump nominated Corker to the seat vacated by Judge J. Ronnie Greer, who took senior status on June 30, 2018. On November 28, 2018, a hearing on his nomination was held before the Senate Judiciary Committee.

On January 3, 2019, his nomination was returned to the President under Rule XXXI, Paragraph 6 of the United States Senate. On January 23, 2019, President Trump announced his intent to renominate Corker for a federal judgeship. His nomination was sent to the Senate later that day. On February 7, 2019, his nomination was reported out of committee by a 12–10 vote. On July 17, 2019, the Senate invoked cloture on his nomination by a 55–41 vote. On July 18, 2019, his nomination was confirmed by a 55–39 vote. He received his judicial commission on July 22, 2019.

=== Notable rulings ===
On June 19, 2023, Corker ruled (in the case of Ultima Services Corp. v. US Department of Agriculture) that the Small Business Administration's 8(a) program, which is meant to award contracts to socially and economically disadvantaged people's businesses, violated the US Constitution's guarantee of equal protection by its presumption that any members of certain racial groups are thereby disadvantaged.

On February 23, 2024, Corker issued a preliminary injunction prohibiting the National Collegiate Athletic Association (NCAA) from enforcing rules to the extent those rules "prohibit student-athletes from negotiating compensation for [name, image, or likeness ('NIL')] with any third-party entity," including boosters and booster-led collectives.

== Personal life ==
Corker is unrelated to former U.S. Senator from Tennessee Bob Corker.

Legal offices
| Preceded by J. Ronnie Greer | Judge of the United States District Court for the Eastern District of Tennessee; 2019–present | Incumbent |
