= Pamela L. Reeves =

American judge (1954–2020)

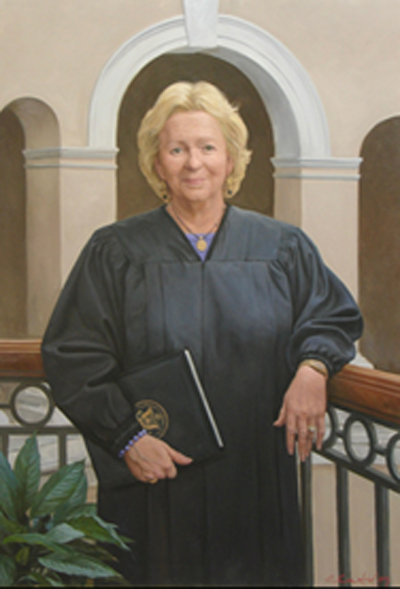

Chief Judge of the United States District Court for the Eastern District of Tennessee
- In office April 1, 2019 – September 10, 2020
- Preceded by: Thomas A. Varlan
- Succeeded by: Travis Randall McDonough

Judge of the United States District Court for the Eastern District of Tennessee
- In office March 7, 2014 – September 10, 2020
- Appointed by: Barack Obama
- Preceded by: Thomas W. Phillips
- Succeeded by: Katherine A. Crytzer

Personal details
- Born: Pamela Lynn Reeves; July 21, 1954 Marion, Virginia, U.S.
- Died: September 10, 2020 (aged 66) Knoxville, Tennessee, U.S.
- Spouse: Charles Swanson
- Children: 2
- Education: University of Tennessee (BA, JD)

Pamela Lynn Reeves (July 21, 1954 – September 10, 2020) was the Chief United States district judge of the United States District Court for the Eastern District of Tennessee. She was the first female judge to serve in the Eastern District.

== Early life and education ==
Reeves was born on July 21, 1954, in Marion, Virginia. She graduated summa cum laude from the University of Tennessee in 1976 with a Bachelor of Arts degree in history. She received a Juris Doctor in 1979 from the George C. Taylor College of Law at the University of Tennessee.

== Career ==
From 1979 to 1985 she worked as an associate at the law firm of Griffin, Burkhalter, Cooper & Reeves and from 1985 to 1987 as an associate at Morrison, Morrison, Tyree & Dickenson. From 1987 to 2002, she worked at the law firm of Watson, Hollow & Reeves. She formed the law firm of Reeves, Herbert & Anderson, P.A. in Knoxville, in 2002, where she practiced mediation and litigation concentrated in the area of employment and contract matters. From 1998 to 1999, she served as the first woman President of the Tennessee Bar Association. In 2019, the Tennessee Bar Association awarded Reeves the Judicial Excellence Award and the first-ever Professionalism Award. A few days before her death, the University of Tennessee bestowed her with the University's Distinguished Alumna Award.

Reeves's legal work centered largely on discrimination suits. She was involved in a sexual harassment-related case involving the TVA just months after receiving her law license, and would go on to represent both plaintiffs and defendants in discrimination-related cases throughout her career. She also worked as a mediator in sexual harassment cases; during her time at Watson, Hollow & Reeves, she represented government agencies and government officials who, in her words, "had gotten into trouble." In an interview, she named Meritor Savings Bank v. Vinson, which recognized sexual harassment as a violation of Title VII of the Civil Rights Act of 1964, as her favorite Supreme Court decision.

=== Federal judicial service ===
On May 16, 2013, President Barack Obama nominated Reeves to serve as a United States district judge of the United States District Court for the Eastern District of Tennessee, to the seat being vacated by Judge Thomas W. Phillips, who eventually took senior status on August 1, 2013. Her nomination was reported out of committee on January 16, 2014. The motion to invoke cloture was agreed to on March 5, 2014 by a 62–37 vote. Her nomination was confirmed later that day by a 99–0 vote. She received her judicial commission on March 7, 2014, and she became chief judge on April 1, 2019.

== Death ==
Reeves died on September 10, 2020, from cancer.

Legal offices
Preceded by Thomas W. Phillips	Judge of the United States District Court for the Eastern District of Tennessee; 2014–2020	Succeeded by Katherine A. Crytzer
Preceded by Thomas A. Varlan	Chief Judge of the United States District Court for the Eastern District of Tennessee; 2019–2020	Succeeded by Travis Randall McDonough
