= Thomas A. Varlan =

American judge (born 1956)

Senior Judge of the United States District Court for the Eastern District of Tennessee
- Incumbent
- Assumed office October 5, 2026

Chief Judge of the United States District Court for the Eastern District of Tennessee
- In office October 8, 2012 – March 31, 2019
- Preceded by: Curtis Lynn Collier
- Succeeded by: Pamela L. Reeves

Judge of the United States District Court for the Eastern District of Tennessee
- In office March 14, 2003 – October 5, 2026
- Appointed by: George W. Bush
- Preceded by: Robert Leon Jordan
- Succeeded by: vacant

Personal details
- Born: Thomas Alexander Varlan; July 1, 1956 (age 70) Oak Ridge, Tennessee
- Education: University of Tennessee (BA); Vanderbilt University Law School (JD)

Thomas Alexander Varlan (born July 1, 1956) is a senior United States district judge of the United States District Court for the Eastern District of Tennessee.

== Education and career ==
Born in Oak Ridge, Tennessee, Varlan received a Bachelor of Arts degree from the University of Tennessee in 1978 and a Juris Doctor from Vanderbilt University School of Law in 1981. He was in private practice in Atlanta, Georgia, from 1981 to 1987. He was the law director for the City of Knoxville, Tennessee, from 1988 to 1998, thereafter returning to private practice in Knoxville from 1998 to 2003.

== District court service ==
On January 7, 2003, Varlan was nominated by President George W. Bush to a seat on the United States District Court for the Eastern District of Tennessee vacated by Robert Leon Jordan. Varlan was confirmed by the United States Senate on March 13, 2003, and received his commission on March 14, 2003. He became Chief Judge on October 8, 2012. His term as Chief Judge ended on March 31, 2019.

On December 25, 2025, Varlan announced his decision to take Senior Status on October 5, 2026.

== Sources ==
Legal offices
Preceded by Robert Leon Jordan	Judge of the United States District Court for the Eastern District of Tennessee; 2003–2026	Vacant
Preceded by Curtis Lynn Collier	Chief Judge of the United States District Court for the Eastern District of Tennessee; 2012–2019	Succeeded by Pamela L. Reeves
