= J. Ronnie Greer =

American judge (born 1952)

Senior Judge of the United States District Court for the Eastern District of Tennessee
- Incumbent
- Assumed office June 30, 2018

Judge of the United States District Court for the Eastern District of Tennessee
- In office June 12, 2003 – June 30, 2018
- Appointed by: George W. Bush
- Preceded by: Thomas Gray Hull
- Succeeded by: Clifton L. Corker

Personal details
- Born: James Ronnie Greer; 1952 (age 73–74) Mountain City, Tennessee
- Education: East Tennessee State University (BS); University of Tennessee College of Law (JD)

James Ronnie Greer, known professionally as J. Ronnie Greer, (born 1952) is a senior United States district judge of the United States District Court for the Eastern District of Tennessee.

== Education and career ==
Born in Mountain City, Tennessee, Greer received a Bachelor of Science degree from East Tennessee State University in 1974 and a Juris Doctor from the University of Tennessee College of Law in 1980. He was a special assistant to Governor Lamar Alexander in Nashville from 1980 to 1981. He entered private practice in 1981, and was also the campaign manager for the Robin Beard U.S. Senate Campaign from 1981 to 1982, returning to full-time private practice in Greeneville from 1983 to 2003. He was a county attorney of Greene County from 1985 to 1986, and was then a state senator in the Tennessee General Assembly from 1986 to 1994.

== District court service ==
On April 9, 2003, Greer was nominated by President George W. Bush to a seat on the United States District Court for the Eastern District of Tennessee vacated by Thomas Gray Hull. Greer was confirmed by the United States Senate on June 11, 2003, and received his commission on June 12, 2003. He assumed senior status on June 30, 2018.

== Notable case ==
He is known for his tough sentence of moonshiner Marvin "Popcorn" Sutton. Sutton's wife maintains that this sentence was the reason he died by suicide.

== Sources ==
Legal offices
Preceded by Thomas Gray Hull	Judge of the United States District Court for the Eastern District of Tennessee; 2003–2018	Succeeded by Clifton L. Corker
