= William C. Killian =

American lawyer

United States Attorney for the Eastern District of Tennessee
- In office October 4, 2010 – December 5, 2015
- President: Barack Obama
- Preceded by: James R. Dedrick
- Succeeded by: J. Douglas Overbey

Personal details
- Born: February 14, 1949 (age 77) Chattanooga, Tennessee, U.S.
- Education: University of Tennessee (BS); University of Tennessee College of Law (JD)

Military service
- Allegiance: United States
- Branch/service: United States Army
- Years of service: 1970–1973
- Rank: Corporal
- Unit: Tennessee National Guard

William C. Killian (born February 14, 1949) is an American attorney. He previously served as the United States Attorney for the Eastern District of Tennessee.

== Military service and education ==
Killian served in the United States Army as part of the Tennessee National Guard from 1970 until 1973, when he received an honorable discharge as a corporal. He is a graduate of the University of Tennessee in 1971 and the University of Tennessee College of Law in 1975.

== Legal career ==
Killian had been a sole practitioner at William C. Killian, Attorney at Law, P.C., from 1979 to 2010. He also served as a City Attorney for the town of Monteagle from 1981 to 1988, and from 1996 to 2010; and as an Assistant District Attorney for the 12th Judicial District of Tennessee from 1976 to 1979, and from 1988 to 1990. From 1979 to 1980, he was an adjunct professor at both Edmondson Junior College and the Northeast State Junior College.

== United States Attorney ==
On May 20, 2010 Killian was nominated by President Barack Obama to be the United States Attorney for the Eastern District of Tennessee. He was reported favorably by the United States Senate Committee on the Judiciary on September 23, 2010. He was confirmed by the full United States Senate by voice vote on September 29, 2010. He was sworn into office on October 4, 2010. Killian prosecuted a case on the basis of "public safety concerns" in which a convict, Edward Young, touched shotgun shells while helping a recently widowed neighbor sort through her deceased husband's belongings; Young was subsequently sentenced to a mandatory minimum of fifteen years in federal prison. On November 19, 2015, Killian resigned from office to rejoin private practice.

Legal offices
Preceded by James R. Dedrick	United States Attorney for the Eastern District of Tennessee; 2010–2015	Succeeded by J. Douglas Overbey
