= Emory M. Sneeden =

American judge (1927–1987)

Emory Sneeden

Judge of the United States Court of Appeals for the Fourth Circuit
- In office October 4, 1984 – March 1, 1986
- Appointed by: Ronald Reagan
- Preceded by: Seat established by 98 Stat. 333
- Succeeded by: William Walter Wilkins

Personal details
- Born: Emory Marlin Sneeden; May 30, 1927 Wilmington, North Carolina
- Died: September 24, 1987 (aged 60) Durham, North Carolina
- Education: Wake Forest University (BS); Wake Forest University School of Law (LLB)

Emory Marlin Sneeden (May 30, 1927 – September 24, 1987) was a United States circuit judge of the United States Court of Appeals for the Fourth Circuit.

== Education and career ==
Sneeden was born in Wilmington, North Carolina. He graduated from Wake Forest University with a Bachelor of Science degree in 1949, and earned a Bachelor of Laws from the Wake Forest University School of Law in 1953. He also attended the United States Army War College, The Hague Academy of International Law, and the Executive Management Program at the University of Pittsburgh. During World War II, he served in the United States Army, later serving in the Judge Advocate General's Corps stationed in Korea and Vietnam, and was eventually appointed as the Army's Chief Judge before his retirement from the service at the rank of Brigadier General in 1975. Following his retirement from the U.S. Army, he served on the Senate Judiciary Committee staff of United States Senator Strom Thurmond, before joining the faculty at the University of South Carolina School of Law. He later served as Chief Minority Counsel and Chief Counsel of the Senate Judiciary Committee from 1979 to 1981. He was in the private practice of law in Washington, D.C. from 1981 to 1985.

== Federal judicial service ==
Sneeden was nominated by President Ronald Reagan on August 1, 1984, to the United States Court of Appeals for the Fourth Circuit, to a new seat created by 98 Stat. 333. He was confirmed by the United States Senate on October 4, 1984, and received his commission the same day. His service was terminated on March 1, 1986, due to his resignation.

== Final years and death ==
After his resignation from the bench, Sneeden returned to private practice in Washington, D.C. until his death from cancer on September 24, 1987, in Durham, North Carolina. In 1989, a courtroom in Hanaur, Germany was named in his honor.

== Sources ==
- University of South Carolina Law School-Memory Hold the Door-Emory Marlin Sneeden

Legal offices
Preceded by Seat established by 98 Stat. 333	Judge of the United States Court of Appeals for the Fourth Circuit; 1984–1986	Succeeded by William Walter Wilkins
