= Robert Leon Jordan =

American judge (1934–2024)

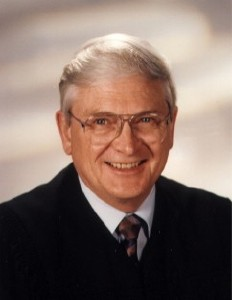
- Jordan, c. 2000

Senior Judge of the United States District Court for the Eastern District of Tennessee
- In office November 30, 2001 – February 27, 2024

Judge of the United States District Court for the Eastern District of Tennessee
- In office October 17, 1988 – November 30, 2001
- Appointed by: Ronald Reagan
- Preceded by: Robert Love Taylor
- Succeeded by: Thomas A. Varlan

Personal details
- Born: June 28, 1934 Woodlawn, Tennessee, U.S.
- Died: February 27, 2024 (aged 89) Maryville, Tennessee, U.S.
- Education: University of Tennessee (BS, JD)

Robert Leon Jordan (June 28, 1934 – February 27, 2024) was a United States district judge of the United States District Court for the Eastern District of Tennessee.

== Education and career ==
Jordan was born in Woodlawn, Tennessee. He served in the United States Army from 1954 to 1956. He received a Bachelor of Science degree from the University of Tennessee in 1958 and a Juris Doctor from the University of Tennessee College of Law in 1960. He was in private practice in Nashville, Tennessee from 1960 to 1961. He was a manager for the Frontier Refining Company in Denver, Colorado from 1962 to 1964, returning to private practice in Johnson City, Tennessee from 1964 to 1966. He was thereafter a trust officer of the First People's Bank of Johnson City until 1969, and then of First National Bank of Milton, Florida and of the Commercial National Bank of Pensacola, Florida (of which he was also a Vice President) until 1971. He resumed private practice in Johnson City from 1971 to 1980, and was a Chancellor of the First Judicial District of Tennessee from 1980 to 1988.

=== Federal judicial service ===
On July 25, 1988, Jordan was nominated by President Ronald Reagan to a seat on the United States District Court for the Eastern District of Tennessee vacated by Judge Robert Love Taylor. Jordan was confirmed by the United States Senate on October 14, 1988, and received his commission on October 17, 1988. He assumed senior status on November 30, 2001.

== Death ==
Jordan died in Maryville, Tennessee, on February 27, 2024, at the age of 89.

== Sources ==
Legal offices
Preceded by Robert Love Taylor	Judge of the United States District Court for the Eastern District of Tennessee; 1988–2001	Succeeded by Thomas A. Varlan
