= Curtis Lynn Collier =

American judge (born 1949)

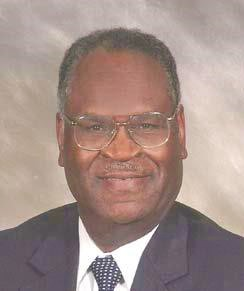

Senior Judge of the United States District Court for the Eastern District of Tennessee
- Incumbent
- Assumed office October 31, 2014

Chief Judge of the United States District Court for the Eastern District of Tennessee
- In office 2005–2012
- Preceded by: Robert Allan Edgar
- Succeeded by: Thomas A. Varlan

Judge of the United States District Court for the Eastern District of Tennessee
- In office May 10, 1995 – October 31, 2014
- Appointed by: Bill Clinton
- Preceded by: Seat established by 104 Stat. 5089
- Succeeded by: Travis R. McDonough

Personal details
- Born: October 4, 1949 (age 76) Marianna, Arkansas, U.S.
- Spouse: Cheryl Collier
- Education: Tennessee State University (BS); Duke University (JD)
- Profession: Federal judge

Curtis Lynn Collier (born October 4, 1949) is a senior United States district judge of the United States District Court for the Eastern District of Tennessee.

== Education and career ==
Born in Marianna, Arkansas, Collier received a Bachelor of Science degree from Tennessee State University in 1971 and a Juris Doctor from Duke University School of Law in 1974. He was in the United States Air Force from 1974 to 1979. While in the Air Force, he was an Assistant Staff Judge Advocate in the Judge Advocate General's Corps with the rank of Captain. He was an Assistant United States Attorney of the Eastern District of Louisiana from 1979 to 1987 and held the same office in the Eastern District of Tennessee from 1987 to 1995.

== Federal judicial service ==
Collier is a United States district judge of the United States District Court for the Eastern District of Tennessee. He was nominated by President Bill Clinton on February 13, 1995, to a new seat created by 104 Stat. 5089. He was confirmed by the Senate on May 8, 1995, and received his commission on May 10, 1995. He served as chief judge from 2005 to 2012. He assumed senior status on October 31, 2014.

== See also ==
- List of African-American federal judges
- List of African-American jurists

Legal offices
Preceded by Seat established by 104 Stat. 5089	Judge of the United States District Court for the Eastern District of Tennessee; 1995–2014	Succeeded by Travis R. McDonough
Preceded by Robert Allan Edgar	Chief Judge of the United States District Court for the Eastern District of Tennessee; 2005–2012	Succeeded by Thomas A. Varlan
