= Doug Overbey =

American politician (born 1954)

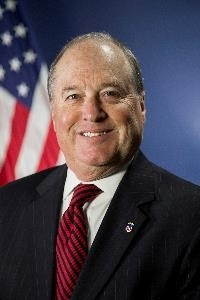
- Official portrait, 2018

United States Attorney for the Eastern District of Tennessee
- In office November 21, 2017 – February 28, 2021
- President: Donald Trump; Joe Biden
- Preceded by: William C. Killian
- Succeeded by: Francis M. Hamilton III

Member of the Tennessee Senate
- In office January 13, 2009 – November 21, 2017
- Preceded by: Raymond Finney
- Succeeded by: Art Swann
- Constituency: 8th district (2009-2013); 2nd district (2013-2017)

Member of the Tennessee House of Representatives from the 20th district
- In office January 9, 2001 – January 13, 2009
- Preceded by: Howard T. Kerr
- Succeeded by: Bob Ramsey

Personal details
- Born: December 11, 1954 (age 71)
- Party: Republican
- Spouse: Kay
- Children: 3
- Education: Carson-Newman College (BA); University of Tennessee College of Law (JD)

J. Douglas Overbey (born December 11, 1954) is an American lawyer and former politician who served as the United States Attorney for the Eastern District of Tennessee from 2017 to 2021. On February 8, 2021, he was among 56 Trump-era attorneys who were asked to resign. He is a senior partner and co-founder of the Robertson Overbey law firm and has served as an adjunct faculty member at the University of Tennessee College of Law.

Previously, Overbey served as a Republican representative in the Tennessee House from 2001 to 2009. He later served in the Tennessee Senate before leaving to become U.S. Attorney.

== Education and career ==
Overbey graduated magna cum laude from Carson-Newman College in 1976 with a Bachelor of Arts degree and first in his class from the University of Tennessee College of Law, in 1979, where he was named to the Order of the Coif and the Phi Delta Phi, Roosevelt Inn, Graduate of the Year. Overbey is a co-founder of the law firm of Robertson, Overbey, Wilson & Beeler. He is a member of the American, Tennessee, Knoxville and Blount County Bar Associations, has served as a member of the House of Delegates of the Tennessee Bar Association, and has been a presenter at many CLE seminars, including annual legislative updates for the Knoxville and Blount County Bar Associations.

== Community involvement ==
He has been active in the Blount County community, having served two terms on the Blount County Commission, and as President of Maryville Kiwanis, President of the United Way of Blount County, Chairman of the Maryville-Alcoa College Community Orchestra, Chairman of the Johnson Girls Group Home, and board member of the Blount County Chamber of Commerce and Knoxville Museum of Art. He has also served on the Maryville College Board of Church Visitors and on the board of Success by Six. He is a graduate of the 2004 Class of Leadership Blount.

He currently serves on the Boards of New Hope – Blount County Children's Advocacy Center, A Secret Safe Place for Newborns of Tennessee, Presbyterian Homes of Tennessee, and SunTrust Bank of East Tennessee, and is an Advisory Member of the board of directors of the Great Smoky Mountain Council, Boy Scouts of America. He was recently named as a member of the Board of the East Tennessee Development District. He is a member of the Sevier County Ruritan Club and a member of the Class of 2009 of Leadership Sevier. Sen. Overbey also holds the rank of captain in the Tennessee Civil Air Patrol.

He is an active member of St. Andrew's Episcopal Church and served ten years as Chancellor of the Episcopal Diocese of East Tennessee. He is the only lay person to serve as President of the Standing Committee of the Diocese of East Tennessee.

== Politics ==
On January 13, 2009, Overbey was sworn in as Tennessee State Senator for the Eighth District, representing Blount and Sevier Counties. As a member of the 106th Tennessee General Assembly, he has been appointed to serve on the Finance, Ways & Means Committee, Secretary of the Judiciary Committee, and a member of the Health & General Welfare Committee.

Overbey previously represented the 20th House district in the 102nd, 103rd, 104th, and 105th General Assemblies, where he served on the Finance, Ways & Means Committee, Health & Human Resources Committee, Calendar & Rules Committee, Select Committee on Ethics, and Joint Select Committee on Children and Youth. He was Chairman of the House Health Care Facilities Subcommittee for six years and a member of the Budget Subcommittee for four years. He also served as Secretary of the Special Joint Committee to Study the Development and Implementation of a Long-Term Care Services Plan and on the Tennessee Court Information System Steering Committee.
