= William Walter Wilkins =

American judge (born 1942)

William Wilkins

Senior Judge of the United States Court of Appeals for the Fourth Circuit
- In office July 1, 2007 – October 5, 2008

Chief Judge of the United States Court of Appeals for the Fourth Circuit
- In office February 15, 2003 – July 1, 2007
- Preceded by: J. Harvie Wilkinson III
- Succeeded by: Karen J. Williams

Judge of the United States Court of Appeals for the Fourth Circuit
- In office June 16, 1986 – July 1, 2007
- Appointed by: Ronald Reagan
- Preceded by: Emory M. Sneeden
- Succeeded by: Albert Diaz

Chair of the United States Sentencing Commission
- In office 1985–1994
- President: Ronald Reagan; George H. W. Bush; Bill Clinton
- Preceded by: Position established
- Succeeded by: Richard Paul Conaboy

Judge of the United States District Court for the District of South Carolina
- In office July 22, 1981 – July 10, 1986
- Appointed by: Ronald Reagan
- Preceded by: Robert W. Hemphill
- Succeeded by: Karen L. Henderson

Personal details
- Born: William Walter Wilkins Jr. March 29, 1942 (age 84) Anderson, South Carolina, U.S.
- Party: Republican
- Children: Walt
- Relatives: David H. Wilkins
- Education: Davidson College (BA); University of South Carolina (JD)

William Walter "Billy" Wilkins Jr. (born March 29, 1942) is a former United States circuit judge of the United States Court of Appeals for the Fourth Circuit and a former United States District Judge of the United States District Court for the District of South Carolina.

== Education and career ==
Born in Anderson, South Carolina, Wilkins received a Bachelor of Arts degree from Davidson College in 1964 and a Juris Doctor from the University of South Carolina Law School in 1967. He served on active duty for two years, in active reserves, and the South Carolina National Guard for twenty-five years. He holds the retired rank of Brigadier General. He was a law clerk to then chief judge, Clement Haynsworth, of the United States Court of Appeals for the Fourth Circuit from 1969 to 1970. He was a legal assistant to United States Senator Strom Thurmond from 1970 to 1971. He was in private practice in Greenville, South Carolina from 1971 to 1978, also serving as the Solicitor (District Attorney) of the Thirteenth Judicial Circuit, South Carolina from 1974 to 1981.

== Federal judicial service ==
Wilkins was nominated by President Ronald Reagan on July 9, 1981, to a seat on the United States District Court for the District of South Carolina vacated by Judge Robert W. Hemphill. He was confirmed by the United States Senate on July 20, 1981, and received commission on July 22, 1981. He was Reagan's first appointment to the federal bench. His service terminated on July 10, 1986, due to his elevation to the court of appeals.

He served as Chair of the United States Sentencing Commission from 1985 to 1994.

Wilkins was nominated by President Reagan on June 3, 1986, to a seat on the United States Court of Appeals for the Fourth Circuit vacated by Judge Emory M. Sneeden. He was confirmed by the Senate on June 13, 1986, and received commission on June 16, 1986. He served as Chief Judge from 2003 to 2007. He assumed senior status on July 1, 2007. His service terminated on October 5, 2008, due to retirement.

== Post judicial service ==
He presently leads Nexsen Pruet law firm's Appellate Advocacy, Corporate Compliance / Crisis Management, and White Collar Crime practices and is active with the firm's business litigation practice.

Legal offices
Preceded by Robert W. Hemphill	Judge of the United States District Court for the District of South Carolina; 1981–1986	Succeeded by Karen L. Henderson
Preceded by Emory M. Sneeden	Judge of the United States Court of Appeals for the Fourth Circuit; 1986–2007	Succeeded by Albert Diaz
Preceded by J. Harvie Wilkinson III	Chief Judge of the United States Court of Appeals for the Fourth Circuit; 2003–2007	Succeeded by Karen J. Williams
