= Robert Allan Edgar =

American judge (born 1940)

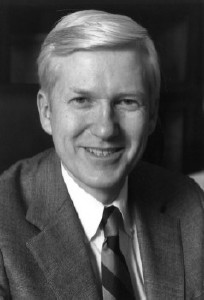

Senior Judge of the United States District Court for the Eastern District of Tennessee
- Incumbent
- Assumed office October 7, 2005

Chief Judge of the United States District Court for the Eastern District of Tennessee
- In office 1998–2005
- Preceded by: James Howard Jarvis II
- Succeeded by: Curtis Lynn Collier

Judge of the United States District Court for the Eastern District of Tennessee
- In office April 16, 1985 – October 7, 2005
- Appointed by: Ronald Reagan
- Preceded by: Herbert Theodore Milburn
- Succeeded by: Harry Sandlin Mattice Jr.

Personal details
- Born: Robert Allan Edgar; 1940 (age 85–86) Munising, Michigan
- Education: Davidson College (B.A.); Duke University School of Law (LL.B.)

Robert Allan Edgar (born 1940) is an inactive Senior United States district judge of the United States District Court for the Eastern District of Tennessee.

== Education and career ==
Born in Munising, Michigan, Edgar received a Bachelor of Arts degree from Davidson College in 1962 and a Bachelor of Laws from Duke University School of Law in 1965. He was in the United States Army from 1965 to 1967 and became a captain. While in the army, he served in intelligence and security services in Vietnam during the Vietnam War September 1966 to March 1967. He was in private practice in Chattanooga, Tennessee from 1967 to 1985. He was a representative in the Tennessee State Legislature from 1970 to 1972.

== Federal judicial service ==
On February 26, 1985, Edgar was nominated by President Ronald Reagan to a seat on the United States District Court for the Eastern District of Tennessee vacated by Judge Herbert Theodore Milburn. Edgar was confirmed by the United States Senate on April 15, 1985, and received his commission on April 16, 1985. He served as Chief Judge from 1998 to 2005, assuming senior status on October 7, 2005. He took inactive senior status on June 30, 2016, meaning that while he remains a federal judge, he no longer hears cases or participates in the business of the court.

== Sources ==
Legal offices
Preceded by Herbert Theodore Milburn	Judge of the United States District Court for the Eastern District of Tennessee; 1985–2005	Succeeded by Harry Sandlin Mattice Jr.
Preceded by James Howard Jarvis II	Chief Judge of the United States District Court for the Eastern District of Tennessee; 1998–2005	Succeeded by Curtis Lynn Collier
