= Karen L. Henderson =

American federal judge (born 1944)

Karen Henderson

Judge of the United States Court of Appeals for the District of Columbia Circuit
- Incumbent
- Assumed office July 5, 1990
- Appointed by: George H. W. Bush
- Preceded by: Ken Starr

Judge of the United States District Court for the District of South Carolina
- In office June 16, 1986 – July 11, 1990
- Appointed by: Ronald Reagan
- Preceded by: William Walter Wilkins
- Succeeded by: Dennis Shedd

Personal details
- Born: July 11, 1944 (age 82) Oberlin, Ohio, U.S.
- Education: Duke University (BA); University of North Carolina at Chapel Hill (JD)

Karen LeCraft Henderson (born July 11, 1944) is an American lawyer and jurist serving since 1990 as a U.S. circuit judge on the U.S. Court of Appeals for the District of Columbia Circuit. She was previously a district judge on the U.S. District Court for the District of South Carolina from 1986 to 1990.

== Early life and education ==
Henderson was born and raised in Oberlin, Ohio. She received a Bachelor of Arts degree from Duke University in 1966 and a Juris Doctor from the University of North Carolina School of Law in 1969.

== Career ==
Following law school, Henderson entered private practice in Chapel Hill, North Carolina. From 1973 to 1983, she was with the Office of the South Carolina Attorney General, ultimately in the position of deputy attorney general. In 1983, she returned to private practice as a member of the firm of Sinkler, Gibbs & Simons of Charleston and Columbia, South Carolina.

On June 3, 1986, Henderson was nominated by President Ronald Reagan to a seat on the U.S. District Court for the District of South Carolina vacated by Judge William Walter Wilkins. She was confirmed by the United States Senate on June 13, 1986, and received her commission on June 16, 1986. Her service terminated on July 11, 1990, due to her elevation to the court of appeals.

On May 8, 1990, President George H. W. Bush nominated Henderson to a seat on the U.S. Court of Appeals for the District of Columbia Circuit that had been vacated by the resignation of Kenneth Starr to become Solicitor General of the United States. The Senate confirmed Henderson on June 28, 1990, by unanimous consent, and she received her commission on July 5, 1990.

=== Second Amendment ===
In Parker v. District of Columbia (2007) Henderson authored a dissent in which she wrote "the right of the people to keep and bear arms relates to those Militia whose continued vitality is required to safeguard the individual States." She also wrote that "the Constitution, case law and applicable statutes all establish that the District is not a state within the meaning of the Second Amendment".

=== National security ===
In Rasul v. Myers (2008), Henderson wrote for the majority when it found that British detainees at the Guantanamo Bay detention camp could not sue the government under the Alien Tort Statute, the Geneva Conventions, and the Religious Freedom Restoration Act for alleged torture, abuse, and denial of religious free expression. The case was reportedly the first federal appeals court decision involving the treatment of terrorism suspects in the wake of the September 11 attacks.

In March 2017, Henderson found that the Foreign Sovereign Immunities Act prevented an Ethiopian dissident living with asylum in the United States from suing the Ethiopian government for infecting his home computer with FinSpy spyware and then surveilling him in Maryland.

In August 2018, Henderson wrote for the unanimous panel when it again rejected Guantanamo Bay detainee Moath Hamza Ahmed al Alawi's petition for habeas corpus, reasoned that the Authorization for Use of Military Force of 2001 had not expired, that the National Defense Authorization Act for Fiscal Year 2012 had further authorized detentions, and that the international law of war permitted detention of enemy combatants as long as "active combat" continued.

=== Immigration ===
In October 2017, Henderson dissented in the en banc-stage of Azar v. Garza, arguing that an undocumented immigrant is not a "person" under the United States Constitution and so does not have rights under the Due Process Clause.

=== Cases involving Donald Trump ===
In November 2019, Henderson indicated she wanted to revisit a 3-panel ruling allowing Congress to access Trump's tax records. The DC Circuit rejected her view by an 8–3 vote. She was the only judge to dissent who was not appointed by Trump.

In February 2020, Henderson joined the opinion of Circuit Judge Thomas B. Griffith when the majority held that the United States House Committee on the Judiciary could not enforce a subpoena upon President Trump's former White House Counsel, Don McGahn. Henderson wrote a concurrence arguing that the House did not have standing to sue here, while Circuit Judge Judith W. Rogers wrote a dissent. The full D.C. Circuit rejected this position on August 8, 2020.

In June 2020, Henderson joined the opinion of fellow Circuit Judge Neomi Rao issuing a writ of mandamus ordering a district court judge to grant a motion brought by federal prosecutors asking that the criminal charges against Michael Flynn be dismissed. The district judge appealed and after hearing the case en banc, the appeals court on August 31, 2020, ruled 8–2 against issuing the writ of mandamus, with Rao and Henderson joining each other's dissents.

On November 30, 2021, Henderson authored a unanimous ruling requiring the DOJ hand over more of the Mueller report, citing the Freedom of Information Act.

== Criticism of hiring practices ==
On May 16, 2022, the Washington Post published an article reporting that Henderson "hires only men among the three or four people she selects each year for clerkships." Specifically, the article stated that of "more than 70 clerks" Henderson hired since 1990, all but one were men. Henderson responded in a statement: "I give equal treatment and consideration to all applicants and hire law clerks based only on their credentials. To the extent any contrary impression exists, I regret that such impression exists and I will use my best efforts to address it."

== See also ==
- United States Court of Appeals for the District of Columbia Circuit
- List of current United States circuit judges
- List of United States federal judges by longevity of service

Legal offices
Preceded by William Walter Wilkins	Judge of the United States District Court for the District of South Carolina; 1986–1990	Succeeded by Dennis Shedd
Preceded by Ken Starr	Judge of the United States Court of Appeals for the District of Columbia Circuit; 1990–present	Incumbent
