= United States District Court for the Eastern District of Tennessee =

United States federal district court in Tennessee

Coordinates: 35.962012°N 83.916955°W

- (E.D. Tenn.)
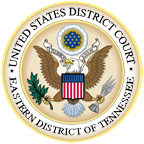

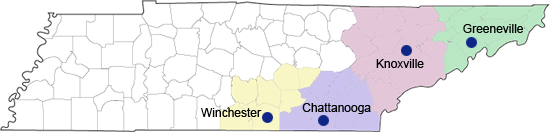
- The four divisions of the Eastern District of Tennessee, with courthouse locations
- Location: Knoxville More locations: Joel W. Solomon Federal Building and U.S. Courthouse (Chattanooga); Greeneville; Winchester
- Appeals to: Sixth Circuit
- Established: April 29, 1802
- Judges: 5
- Chief Judge: Travis R. McDonough

Officers of the court
- U.S. Attorney: Francis M. Hamilton III
- U.S. Marshal: David G. Jolley
- www.tned.uscourts.gov

The United States District Court for the Eastern District of Tennessee (in case citations, E.D. Tenn.) is the federal court in the Sixth Circuit whose jurisdiction covers most of East Tennessee and a portion of Middle Tennessee. The court has jurisdiction over 41 counties, which are divided among four divisions. Based in Knoxville, Tennessee, it maintains branch facilities in Chattanooga, Tennessee; Greeneville, Tennessee; and Winchester, Tennessee.

- The Southern Division, based in Chattanooga, serves Bledsoe, Bradley, Hamilton, Marion, McMinn, Meigs, Polk, Rhea and Sequatchie counties.
- The Northeastern Division, based in Greeneville, serves Carter, Cocke, Greene, Hamblen, Hancock, Hawkins, Johnson, Sullivan, Unicoi and Washington counties.
- The Northern Division, based in Knoxville, serves Anderson, Blount, Campbell, Claiborne, Grainger, Jefferson, Knox, Loudon, Monroe, Morgan, Roane, Scott, Sevier and Union counties.
- The Winchester Division serves Bedford, Coffee, Franklin, Grundy, Lincoln, Moore, Warren and Van Buren counties.

The United States Attorney for the Eastern District of Tennessee represents the United States in civil and criminal litigation in the court. Since January 5, 2021, the United States attorney has been Francis M. Hamilton III, first as interim United States attorney appointed by United States Attorney General Merrick Garland, until appointed full United States attorney, on April 25, 2022, by the District Court itself, while still waiting for a Presidential appointee to be confirmed by the US Senate.

The court was established by the Judiciary Act of 1801 ("Midnight Judges" Act) wherein Congress created a new Sixth Circuit with two districts in Tennessee. Since 1797, the state had been organized by Congress into one judicial district with one judge, John McNairy.

Tennessee – along with Kentucky, Ohio, and Michigan – is located within the area covered by United States Court of Appeals for the Sixth Circuit, and appeals are taken to that court (except for patent claims and claims against the U.S. government under the Tucker Act, which are appealed to the Federal Circuit).

== History ==
The United States District Court for the District of Tennessee was established with one judgeship on January 31, 1797, by 1 Stat. 496. The judgeship was filled by President George Washington's appointment of John McNairy. Since Congress failed to assign the district to a circuit, the court had the jurisdiction of both a district court and a circuit court. Appeals from this one district court went directly to the United States Supreme Court.

On February 13, 1801, in the famous "Midnight Judges" Act of 1801, 2 Stat. 89, Congress abolished the U.S. district court in Tennessee, and expanded the number of circuits to six, provided for independent circuit court judgeships, and abolished the necessity of Supreme Court Justices riding the circuits. It was this legislation which created the grandfather of the present Sixth Circuit. The act provided for a "Sixth Circuit" comprising two districts in the State of Tennessee, one district in the State of Kentucky and one district, called the Ohio District, composed of the Ohio and Indiana territories (the latter including the present State of Michigan). The new Sixth Circuit Court was to be held at "Bairdstown" in the District of Kentucky, at Knoxville in the District of East Tennessee, at Nashville in the District of West Tennessee, and at Cincinnati in the District of Ohio. Unlike the other circuits which were provided with three circuit judges, the Sixth Circuit was to have only one circuit judge with district judges from Kentucky and Tennessee comprising the rest of the court. Any two judges constituted a quorum. New circuit judgeships were to be created as district judgeships in Kentucky and Tennessee became vacant.

The repeal of this Act restored the District on March 8, 1802, 2 Stat. 132. The District was divided into the Eastern and Western Districts on April 29, 1802. On February 24, 1807, Congress again abolished the two districts and created the United States Circuit for the District of Tennessee. On March 3, 1837, Congress assigned the judicial district of Tennessee to the Eighth Circuit. On June 18, 1839, by 5 Stat. 313, Congress divided Tennessee into three districts, Eastern, Middle, and Western. Again, only one judgeship was allotted for all three districts. On July 15, 1862, Congress reassigned appellate jurisdiction to the Sixth Circuit. Finally, on June 14, 1878, Congress authorized a separate judgeship for the Western District of Tennessee, at which time President Rutherford B. Hayes appointed David M. Key as judge for the Eastern and Middle Districts of Tennessee. The first judge to serve only the Eastern District of Tennessee was Robert Love Taylor, appointed by Harry S. Truman.

== Current judges ==
As of October 5, 2026:

#	Title	Judge	Duty station	Born	Term of service			Appointed by
#	Title	Judge	Duty station	Born	Active	Chief	Senior	Appointed by
25	Chief Judge	Travis R. McDonough	Chattanooga	1972	2015–present	2020–present	—	Obama
26	District Judge	Clifton L. Corker	Greeneville	1967	2019–present	—	—	Trump
27	District Judge	Charles E. Atchley Jr.	Chattanooga	1966	2020–present	—	—	Trump
28	District Judge	Katherine A. Crytzer	Knoxville	1984	2020–present	—	—	Trump
29	District Judge	vacant	—	—	—	—	—	—
17	Senior Judge	Robert Allan Edgar	inactive	1940	1985–2005	1998–2005	2005–present	Reagan
19	Senior Judge	Curtis Lynn Collier	Chattanooga	1949	1995–2014	2005–2012	2014–present	Clinton
20	Senior Judge	Thomas W. Phillips	Knoxville	1943	2002–2013	—	2013–present	G.W. Bush
21	Senior Judge	Thomas A. Varlan	Knoxville	1956	2003–2026	2012–2019	2026–present	G.W. Bush
22	Senior Judge	J. Ronnie Greer	Greeneville	1952	2003–2018	—	2018–present	G.W. Bush

== Vacancies and pending nominations ==
Seat	Prior judge's duty station	Seat last held by	Vacancy reason	Date of vacancy	Nominee	Date of nomination
1	Knoxville	Thomas A. Varlan	Senior status	October 5, 2026	Samuel Adkisson	September 14, 2026

== Former judges ==
#	Judge	Born–died	Active service	Chief Judge	Senior status	Appointed by	Reason for termination
1	John McNairy	1762–1837	1802–1833 (Note: Reassigned from the District of Tennessee. Jointly appointed to the Eastern and Western Districts of Tennessee.)	—	—	Washington/Operation of law	resignation
2	Morgan Welles Brown	1800–1853	1834–1853 (Note: Jointly appointed to the Eastern and Western Districts of Tennessee. From 1839 to 1853, Judge Brown was jointly appointed to the Middle District of Tennessee.)	—	—	Jackson	death
3	West Hughes Humphreys	1806–1882	1853–1862 (Note: Jointly appointed to the Eastern, Middle, and Western Districts of Tennessee)	—	—	Pierce	removal
4	Connally Findlay Trigg	1810–1880	1862–1880 (Note: Jointly appointed to the Eastern and Middle Districts of Tennessee. From 1862 to 1878, Judge Trigg was jointly appointed to the Western District of Tennessee.)	—	—	Lincoln	death
5	David M. Key	1824–1900	1880–1895 (Note: Jointly appointed to the Eastern and Middle Districts of Tennessee)	—	—	Hayes	retirement
6	Charles Dickens Clark	1847–1908	1895–1908	—	—	Cleveland	death
7	Edward Terry Sanford	1865–1930	1908–1923	—	—	T. Roosevelt	elevation
8	Xenophon Hicks	1872–1952	1923–1928	—	—	Harding	elevation
9	George Caldwell Taylor	1885–1952	1928–1949	1948–1949	1949–1952	Coolidge	death
10	Leslie Rogers Darr	1886–1967	1939–1961 (Note: From 1939 to 1940, Judge Darr was jointly appointed to the Middle District of Tennessee.)	1949–1961	1961–1967	F. Roosevelt	death
11	Robert Love Taylor	1899–1987	1949–1984 (Note: Recess appointment; formally nominated on January 5, 1950, confirmed by the United States Senate on March 8, 1950, and received commission on March 9, 1950)	1961–1969	1984–1987	Truman	death
12	Frank Wiley Wilson	1917–1982	1961–1982	1969–1982	—	Kennedy	death
13	Charles Gelbert Neese	1916–1989	1961–1982 (Note: Recess appointment; formally nominated on January 15, 1962, confirmed by the Senate on February 7, 1962, and received commission on February 17, 1962)	—	1982–1989	Kennedy	death
14	Herbert Theodore Milburn	1931–2016	1983–1984	1984	—	Reagan	elevation
15	Thomas Gray Hull	1926–2008	1983–2002	1984–1991	2002–2008	Reagan	death
16	James Howard Jarvis II	1937–2007	1984–2002	1991–1998	2002–2007	Reagan	death
18	Robert Leon Jordan	1934–2024	1988–2001	—	2001–2024	Reagan	death
23	Harry Sandlin Mattice Jr.	1954–present	2005–2020	—	2020–2021	G.W. Bush	retirement
24	Pamela L. Reeves	1954–2020	2014–2020	2019–2020	—	Obama	death

== Chief judges ==
Chief judges have administrative responsibilities with respect to their district court. Unlike the Supreme Court, where one justice is specifically nominated to be chief, the office of chief judge rotates among the district court judges. To be chief, a judge must have been in active service on the court for at least one year, be under the age of 65, and have not previously served as chief judge.

A vacancy is filled by the judge highest in seniority among the group of qualified judges. The chief judge serves for a term of seven years, or until age 70, whichever occurs first. The age restrictions are waived if no members of the court would otherwise be qualified for the position.

When the office was created in 1948, the chief judge was the longest-serving judge who had not elected to retire, on what has since 1958 been known as senior status, or declined to serve as chief judge. After August 6, 1959, judges could not become or remain chief after turning 70 years old. The current rules have been in operation since October 1, 1982.

== Succession of seats ==
Seat 1
Seat reassigned from District of Tennessee on April 29, 1802 by 2 Stat. 165 (concurrent with Western District)
McNairy	1802–1833
Seat made concurrent with Middle District on June 18, 1839 by 5 Stat. 313
Brown	1833–1853
Humphreys	1853–1862
Concurrency with Western District abolished on June 14, 1878 by 20 Stat. 132
Trigg	1862–1880
Key	1880–1895
Clark	1895–1908
Sanford	1908–1923
Hicks	1923–1928
Concurrency with Middle District abolished on May 23, 1928 pursuant to 42 Stat. 837
G. Taylor	1928–1949
R. Taylor	1949–1984
Jordan	1988–2001
Varlan	2003–2026
vacant	2026–present

Seat 2
Seat established on May 31, 1938 by 52 Stat. 584 (temporary, concurrent with Middle District)
Concurrency with Middle District abolished and seat made permanent on November 27, 1940 by 54 Stat. 1216
Darr	1939–1961
Wilson	1961–1982
Hull	1983–2002
Greer	2003–2018
Corker	2019–present

Seat 3
Seat established on May 19, 1961 by 75 Stat. 80
Neese	1962–1982
Milburn	1983–1984
Edgar	1985–2005
Mattice, Jr.	2005–2020
Atchley, Jr.	2020–present

Seat 4
Seat established on July 10, 1984 by 98 Stat. 333
Jarvis II	1984–2002
Phillips	2002–2013
Reeves	2014–2020
Crytzer	2020–present

Seat 5
Seat established on December 1, 1990 by 104 Stat. 5089
Collier	1995–2014
McDonough	2015–present

== See also ==
- Courts of Tennessee
- List of current United States district judges
- List of United States federal courthouses in Tennessee
