= 2011 in LGBTQ rights =

This is a list of events in 2011 that affected LGBTQ rights.

== Events ==
=== January ===
- 1 — The Civil Partnership and Certain Rights and Obligations of Cohabitants Act 2010 comes into effect in Ireland, allowing same-sex couples to enter civil partnerships.
- 3 — Ugandan High Court Justice V.F. Kibuuka Musoke rules that Rolling Stone violated the civil rights of homosexuals when it printed their pictures on the front page with the headline "Hang Them". The court orders the newspaper to pay each of the three lead plaintiffs USh 1.5 million.
- 7 — The 3rd Court of Appeals in Austin, Texas, rules that the Texas Attorney General does not have standing to intervene in a same-sex divorce case. The ruling, which conflicts with a ruling issued in 2010 by the 5th Court of Appeals, means that a Texas divorce granted to two women who married in Massachusetts is legal. However, the state's ban on same-sex marriage is unaffected.
- 10
  - The Saskatchewan Court of Appeal in Canada rules that marriage commissioners in Saskatchewan cannot refuse to marry same-sex couples due to religious objections. The decision is in response to a proposed law which had two versions: One would allow any marriage commissioner to avoid performing a same-sex wedding because of his or her religion and the other version would allow commissioners to opt out of performing a same-sex ceremony only if they were commissioners before Canada enacted marriage equality in 2004.
  - Newly sworn-in Ohio Governor John Kasich allows a previous executive order prohibiting discrimination in state employment on the basis of sexual orientation and gender identity to expire.
- 14 — A Virginia circuit court judge reverses his earlier ruling and allows one half of a lesbian couple to change her last name legally to that of her partner. The judge had initially denied the name change, stating that since same-sex marriage is illegal in Virginia and the couple "hold themselves out as a married couple" the name change was for "fraudulent purposes".
- 18 — A Bristol County Court judge rules that the owners of a bed and breakfast in Cornwall, United Kingdom, violated the rights of a gay couple in a civil partnership when they refused to rent them a double room because of the owners' Christian beliefs.
- 24 — The Wyoming House of Representatives passes a bill that would bar the state from recognising legal same-sex marriages performed in other legal jurisdictions, changing a law that though bars same-sex marriage within Wyoming recognises legal marriages performed elsewhere.
- 27 — The Iowa Senate rejects a proposal for a voter initiative to amend the Iowa constitution to ban same-sex marriage.
- 28
  - The Constitutional Council of France rules that French laws which restrict marriage to unions between men and women do not violate the French Constitution.
  - In Indiana, the Gary Community School Corporation, as part of the settlement of a lawsuit filed in 2007 by a transgender former student, announces a new anti-discrimination policy that includes specific protections based on sexual orientation and gender identity.
- 31
  - Following its passage in December 2010, Illinois Governor Pat Quinn signs the Illinois Religious Freedom Protection and Civil Union Act. This act allows all couples, regardless of gender, to enter into civil unions which provide all of the state benefits of marriage. The law is scheduled to take effect June 1.
  - As same-sex marriage is constitutionally prohibited in the state of Nebraska, an Otoe County judge refuses to grant a divorce to two women legally married in Vermont in 2003. The judge does, however, rule on child support and visitation rights for the couple's four-year-old daughter (specifics not given).
  - Representatives at São Tomé and Príncipe's United Nations Universal Periodic Review announce that upcoming revisions to its Criminal Code will decriminalize homosexual sex in the country. The new code would come into effect four months later.

=== February ===
- 1 — The United States Department of State begins issuing passport applications that ask applicants for "Mother or parent one" and "Father or parent two" instead of for "Father" and "Mother". The change, announced in December 2010, is "in recognition of different types of families".
- 7 — New York City adopts a new policy regarding transgender marriage license applicants specifying that once an applicant displays a proper photo identification the city clerk may not request further proof of sex.
- 17 — The Arkansas Supreme Court upholds a lower court ruling giving a woman visitation rights with the child of her former partner. The court rules that even though same-sex marriage is not legally recognised in Arkansas, the woman stood in loco parentis to the child.
- 18
  - Massachusetts governor Deval Patrick signs an executive order banning discrimination against state employees based on gender identity or expression.
  - The Alaska Board of Regents votes to add sexual orientation to its anti-discrimination policy.
- 23
  - In response to two lawsuits, Pedersen v. Office of Personnel Management and Windsor v. United States, the US Justice Department announces that it will no longer defend the constitutionality of section 3 of the Defense of Marriage Act although the department will "remain parties (sic) to the cases and continue to represent the interests of the United States throughout the litigation." That section had been ruled unconstitutional in two district court cases, Massachusetts v. United States Department of Health and Human Services and Gill v. Office of Personnel Management.
  - Hawaii governor Neil Abercrombie signs the state's civil unions bill. The law will take effect on 1 January 2012.
- 24 — A New York state appellate court rules that recognising a legal same-sex marriage performed in Canada for purposes of probate does not violate the public policy of the state of New York.

=== March ===
- 1 — The United States Court of Appeals for the Seventh Circuit rules that Indian Prairie School District 204 may not bar students from wearing shirts with anti-LGBT slogans finding that a "school that permits advocacy of the rights of homosexual students cannot be allowed to stifle criticism of homosexuality." The district had argued that it barred a shirt reading "Be Happy, Not Gay" on the grounds that it violated the rights of students toward whom the derogatory comment was directed.
- 2 — The Wyoming Senate defeats a bill that would have prevented the state from recognising same-sex marriages performed in other jurisdictions.
- 7 — Citing the 1971 Minnesota Supreme Court ruling in Baker v. Nelson and the local defense of marriage act, Hennepin County District Judge Mary Dufresne dismisses a lawsuit brought by marriage equality advocacy group Marry Me Minnesota which contended that the ban on same-sex marriage violates the rights of same-sex couples to due process, equal protection, religious freedom and freedom of association.
- 9 — Along party lines, the United States House of Representatives Bipartisan Legal Advisory Group votes to defend the constitutionality of Section 3 of the Defense of Marriage Act after the Obama administration announced it would not support the bill. The Advisory Group vote sidesteps a full House vote on the question.
- 16 — Upon its second reading, the Liechtenstein Parliament passes a bill legalising registered civil partnership. The law will take effect on 1 September 2011.
- 21 — The Cook County Jail in Chicago implements a new policy for housing transgender prisoners, allowing for them to be housed based on their gender identity rather than birth sex.
- 24
  - Canada announces a pilot programme to provide $100,000 in living assistance funds to refugees facing persecution because of their sexual orientation or gender identity.
  - Roman Catholic-operated Marquette University announces that it will offer domestic partnership benefits to employees beginning in 2012.
- 28 — United States Citizenship and Immigration Services (USCIS) announces that it will no longer deny applications for green cards on the part of bi-national same-sex married couples but will put those cases on hold pending resolution of the constitutionality of the Defense of Marriage Act.
- 30
  - USCIS later reverses its ruling and announces that it will continue to deny green cards to bi-national applicants in same-sex marriages.
  - The United States Court of Appeals for the Seventh Circuit dismisses the complaint of a Wal-Mart employee fired in 2005 for anti-gay harassment of another employee. The court rules that Wal-Mart did not violate the fired employee's religious freedom. Wal-Mart's anti-harassment policy includes "sexual orientation" as a category.
- 31 — The Constitutional Court of Korea rules in a 5–4 decision that the Korean military ban on homosexual conduct is constitutional and does not discriminate against homosexual military personnel.

=== April ===
- 5 — The Nashville, Tennessee Metro Council passes a measure requiring businesses with contracts with the city to promise not to discriminate on the basis of sexual orientation or gender identity.
- 7 — The Arkansas Supreme Court upholds a 2010 lower court ruling that a 2008 voter-approved ban on adoption by unmarried cohabiting couples is unconstitutional.
- 11 — The Maine Human Rights Commission finds that a rental agency that repeatedly delayed an application from a transgender applicant illegally discriminated against her based on her gender identity.
- 12 — The United States Court of Appeals for the Fifth Circuit rules that a Louisiana registrar's refusal to list the names of both same-sex adoptive parents on a birth certificate does not violate their child's right to equal protection nor does the Full Faith and Credit Clause, which requires each state to recognize the legal proceedings of the other states, require Louisiana to "confer particular benefits on unmarried adoptive parents contrary to its law."
- 13 — Rear Admiral Mark L. Tidd, Chief of Chaplains of the United States Navy, issues a two-page "guidance" memo stating that following final repeal of the don't ask, don't tell policy, same-sex couples would be allowed to marry in Naval facilities with Naval chaplains officiating in those states in which same-sex marriage is legal.
- 18
  - The National Assembly of Hungary adopts a new constitution that among other things explicitly restricts same-sex marriage. However, same-sex couples may obtain the same legal protections through registering as domestic partners. If signed as expected by President Pál Schmitt it will go into effect on January 1, 2012.
  - Arizona Governor Jan Brewer signs into law a bill that requires adoption agencies in the state to "give primary consideration to adoptive placement with a married man and woman." Agencies may place a child with a legally single person if it is in the child's best interest or if there is no married couple applying for adoption. Same-sex marriage is not legally recognized in Arizona.
- 20 — The Virginia Board of Social Services votes to strike language from new proposed adoption regulations which would have barred discrimination on the basis of sexual orientation. Single people and married mixed-sex couples may adopt children.
- 21 — Montana District Judge Jeffrey Sherlock rules against same-sex couples seeking to force the state to extend the benefits of marriage to them, finding that the state's constitutional ban on same-sex marriage and the separation of powers between the courts and the legislature prevents it.
- 23 — It is reported that pursuant to a 2008 order by then-Governor David Paterson that New York state agencies recognize same-sex unions performed in other jurisdictions, the New York State Department of Correctional Services has updated its regulations to allow prisoners in same-sex marriages and civil unions to have conjugal visits and seek furloughs if a spouse or partner is terminally ill.
- 26
  - In the UK, the Charity Tribunal upholds an earlier ruling from the Charity Commission that denies an exemption from the 2007 Sexual Orientation Regulations to the Leeds-based Catholic Care adoption agency. The charity must consider same-sex couples as prospective adoptive parents and may not discriminate on the basis of sexual orientation.
- 29 — The United States Department of Labor updates its internal equal employment opportunity policy to bar discrimination on the basis of gender identity.

=== May ===
- Nepal takes a national census and officially recognises a third gender in addition to male and female.
- 5
  - The Supreme Federal Court of Brazil rules in a unanimous 10-0 decision, with one abstention, to legalise same-sex stable unions.
  - The ACLU announces a settlement in the case of Witt v. Department of the Air Force. The Air Force agrees to drop its appeal and remove Witt's discharge from her military record and she will retire with full benefits.
  - The Presbyterian Church (U.S.A.) approves a constitutional amendment allowing for the ordination of clergy in same-sex relationships.
  - In the face of political opposition from Republican members of Congress who claimed that allowing the use of federal facilities or personnel to perform same-sex marriages would violate the Defense of Marriage Act, Rear Admiral Mark L. Tidd suspends his April 13 "guidance" memo pending further Naval review.
- 11
  - Delaware Governor Jack Markell signs the state's civil unions bill into law, granting same-sex couples in the state all of the rights of marriage. The law will take effect January 1, 2012.
  - The Minnesota Senate approves a proposed constitutional amendment to bar same-sex marriage in the state.
- 13 — After delaying a vote originally scheduled two day ago, the Parliament of Uganda adjourns without taking action on the country's proposed anti-homosexuality bill.
- 17
  - The Nevada Legislature passes a bill to bar employment discrimination in the state on the basis of gender identity or expression.
  - Moscow mayor Sergei Sobyanin bans a gay pride march scheduled for 28 May, despite an October 2010 ruling by the European Court of Human Rights that similar bans in 2006, 2007 and 2008 violated the European Convention on Human Rights. Activists plan to defy the ban as they had in past years.
- 20
  - The Tennessee Legislature gives final passage to the "Equal Access to Intrastate Commerce Act". The bill would repeal an ordinance passed earlier this year in Nashville that requires companies doing business with the city to adopt anti-discrimination policies that include sexual orientation and gender identity. The bill would also prevent any unit of local government from requiring companies to bar discrimination on any basis that is not illegal under state law. The Tennessee Senate also passes Senate Bill 49, colloquially known as the "Don't Say Gay bill", which would bar schools from presenting any prepared material or lessons about homosexuality to students before high school.
  - United States District Judge Frank Montalvo rules that a voter initiative in El Paso, Texas that stripped health benefits from the unmarried partners of city employees is constitutional. Although supporters of the initiative stated that they only intended to remove benefits from the partners of gay employees, Montalvo finds that the language of the ordinance also strips benefits from city officials and others who are not technically employees of the city.
- 23
  - Tennessee governor Bill Haslam signs the "Equal Access to Intrastate Commerce Act" into law, reversing Nashville's LGBT-inclusive anti-discrimination ordinance and barring any local unit of government from requiring that companies bar discrimination on any basis not already covered by state law.
  - The Church of Scotland votes to allow openly gay ministers, who can live in civil unions.
- 24 — A judge in Wharton, Texas, ruled that a transgender woman is still legally male and invalidates her marriage to a biological male.
- 25
  - Nevada Governor Brian Sandoval signs Assembly Bill 211, which prohibits employment discrimination on the basis of gender identity or expression. The law will take effect October 1.
  - A spokesperson for Brazilian President Dilma Rousseff announces that she has suspended an upcoming distribution of sex education videos through the ministries of health and education, saying that the "anti-homophobia kits", as they are known, are inappropriate for children and do not offer an "objective" view of homosexuality.

=== June ===
- 2 — Nevada Governor Brian Sandoval signs the Nevada Senate Bills 331 and 368, which outlawed discrimination in housing and public accommodation on the basis of gender identity.
- 6 — The Wyoming Supreme Court reverses a lower court ruling and allows an LGBT couple married in Canada to divorce. The ruling recognised same-sex marriage in Wyoming only in the context of divorce.
- 8
  - The Virginia Board of Juvenile Justice, which oversees the state's juvenile correctional facilities, votes unanimously to ban discrimination on the basis of sexual orientation.
  - The Portland, Oregon City Council votes unanimously to expand health coverage for city workers to cover the cost of sex re-assignment surgery up to $50,000.
  - Cambridge, Massachusetts, announces plans to reimburse city employees in legal same-sex marriages for the federal tax burden they incur for the value of health benefits received by their spouses. Under federal law, employers are required to include the value of such benefits as taxable income, while mixed-sex married couples are not taxed. Reimbursement in the form of quarterly stipends are expected to begin in July.
- 10 — The Obama administration issues a "guidance" memo stating that under existing law, states may choose to offer the same level of asset protection to same-sex couples under Medicaid asset recovery plans as it offers to straight married couples.
- 14
  - United States Department of Education Secretary Arne Duncan affirms in a letter to educators that gay-straight alliances should be afforded the same rights and protections as any other student-initiated organisation under the Equal Access Act.
  - The National Assembly of France rejects a bill presented by the opposition Socialist Party seeking to legalise same-sex marriage by 293 votes to 222.
  - The El Paso, Texas city council votes to restore health benefits to the non-married partners of city employees. The benefits had been stripped by a voter initiative in November 2010.
- 15 — The United States Department of Health and Human Services announces its first-ever grant in the amount of $250,000 to create a resource center for LGBT political refugees.
- 16 — The United Nations Human Rights Council passes a declaration which for the first time condemns discrimination on the basis of sexual orientation and gender identity. The declaration also commissions a study of anti-gay discrimination around the world.
- 19 — Voters in Liechtenstein approve a binding resolution by a margin of 68%–32% that recognises registered partnerships. Same-sex couples will have the same tax, inheritance and welfare rights as married couples but will remain barred from adopting children.
- 20 — Dane County Judge Dan Moeser rules that Wisconsin's domestic partnership registry, which offers limited benefits to registered partners, does not violate the state's constitutional ban on same-sex marriage. He finds that the state "does not recognise domestic partnership in a way that even remotely resembles how the state recognises marriage."
- 23 — A Washington County, Maryland judge rules that one member of a same-sex couple legally married in Washington, D.C., may invoke spousal privilege and refuse to testify against her spouse in a criminal case.
- 24
  - Following a 36-26 vote passing exemptions for religious organisations, the New York Senate approves the same-sex marriage law; the New York State Assembly also approved the bill to legalise same-sex marriage in the state by a vote of 80-63. Governor Andrew Cuomo signed the bill into law shortly before midnight. The law would make New York the largest state in the United States to recognise same-sex marriage.
  - Police in Saint Petersburg, Russia, detain 14 gay rights activists holding an unsanctioned gay pride event.
- 27 — São Paulo, Brazil state Judge Fernando Henrique Pinto rules that two men in a civil union may convert their union into a full legal marriage, believed to be the first legal same-sex marriage in the country.

=== July ===
- 2 — Rhode Island Governor Lincoln Chafee signs a civil unions bill into law. The law, which is effective immediately, grants same-sex couples the same rights as married couples but withholds the word "marriage" from their certificates. Some LGBT rights activists had urged Chafee to veto the bill, saying that exemptions for religious organisations were overly broad and might allow some such groups to discriminate against civil unions. However, some rights, such as tax exemptions based on marital status, remain unavailable because the state uses federal tax law to determine them, which does not recognise any form of same-sex union.
- 5 — Governor Dan Malloy of Connecticut signs bill HB-6599, which bars discrimination in employment, housing, public accommodations, credit and other laws based on gender identity or expression. The law, which will take effect 1 October, makes Connecticut the 15th state (along with Washington, D.C.) to outlaw some form of gender identity discrimination.
- 6 — In Log Cabin Republicans v. United States, the United States Court of Appeals for the Ninth Circuit lifts its stay of a lower court's order and orders an immediate halt to the enforcement of "don't ask, don't tell". The court cites progress implementing the 2010 repeal of the policy and the Obama administration's 1 July brief in a DOMA case that cites the history of government and private discrimination based on sexual orientation.
- 7 — The United States Department of Justice seeks to withdraw its appeal of a California same-sex couple's joint bankruptcy petition and announces that it will no longer raise objections to "bankruptcy petitions filed jointly by same-sex couples who are married under state law."
- 14 — California governor Jerry Brown signs the Fair, Accurate, Inclusive and Respectful Education Act. The new law mandates that educational material in California schools includes information on the contributions of LGBT people to California and United States history, prohibits discriminatory material and lessons and adds "sexual orientation" to existing laws that prohibit discrimination in education.
- 15 — The Ninth Circuit Court of Appeals grants the government's emergency request to reinstate "don't ask, don't tell" but bars the government from investigating, penalizing or discharging anyone under the policy.
- 20 — The United States Department of Justice confirms that it, along with the Department of Education's Office of Civil Rights, is investigating Anoka-Hennepin School District 11 in Minnesota for "allegations of harassment and discrimination in the [district] based on sex, including peer-on-peer harassment based on not conforming to gender stereotypes." Several students, including four who, according to friends and family, were homosexual or perceived as such and committed suicide within the last two years. The school district has a policy barring any discussion of homosexuality and requires staff to remain neutral on matters of sexual orientation.
- 22 — The Michigan Supreme Court rejects an appeal from a lesbian seeking shared custody of the children of her former partner.
- 24 — The first legal same-sex marriages are performed in the state of New York. New York City records 659 marriages, a one-day record for the city.
- 26
  - The Constitutional Court of Colombia ruled that same-sex couples in de facto unions constitute a family. The Court further ruled that the Congress of Colombia has two years to address marriage equality through the legislative process. If the deadline passes without legislation, same-sex couples would be able to formalise their unions through notaries public.
  - The United Nations Economic and Social Council reports that the International Gay and Lesbian Association has been granted consultative status. This gives ILGA the right to attend U.N. meetings, speak, and provide information to U.N. bodies on treatment of gays.
  - The Italian Chamber of Deputies rejects a bill that would have outlawed discrimination on the basis of sexual orientation and gender identity.
  - The United States Department of Labor releases a report on employee benefits in the United States which for the first time includes information on the availability of same-sex domestic partnership benefits.
- July — The Evangelical Lutheran Church in Canada allowed same-sex marriages in their churches.

=== August ===
- 1 — Members of the Suquamish tribe in the U.S. state of Washington vote unanimously to legalise same-sex marriage. The tribal court may issue a marriage license to two unmarried adults regardless of sex as long as at least one of them is a registered tribal member.
- 4 — US President Barack Obama signs a proclamation ordering the State Department to bar from entry into the United States anyone who has engaged in oppression against various groups, including those defined by "sexual orientation or gender identity".
- 5 — The United States Court of Appeals for the Seventh Circuit upholds a lower court ruling in Fields v. Smith, striking down Wisconsin's "Inmate Sex Change Prevention Act". The law barred doctors in Wisconsin prisons from prescribing hormone treatment or sex reassignment surgery to transgender inmates. The court found that denial of treatment without a medically necessary reason constitutes cruel and unusual punishment.

=== September ===
- 2 — The California State Senate passes AB 9, known as "Seth's Law", after 13-year-old Seth Walsh, who died by suicide in 2010 after constant homophobic harassment at his school. The bill would require every school in California to implement anti-harassment and anti-discrimination policies and programmes that include actual or perceived sexual orientation and gender identity and expression. The state assembly had passed the bill in June.
- 6 — California governor Jerry Brown signs SB 117 into law. SB 117, also known as the Equal Benefits Act, bars the state from entering into contracts worth more than $100,000 with vendors that do not offer equal benefits to the spouses of same-sex employees.
- 7 — The United States Department of Health and Human Services issues a finalised guidance memorandum that creates an enforcement mechanism for the policy announced last year by the Obama administration mandating hospitals that receive Medicare and Medicaid funding allow patients to designate their choice of visitors during inpatient stays, including same-sex partners.
- 15 — The government of Australia announces new passport guidelines that will allow intersex people to select "X" as their gender identifier. Only intersex people may select X, transgender people must still select either "male" or "female".
- 17 — Alaska Supreme Court Judge Frank Pfiffner rules that denying same-sex couples the senior citizen and property tax exemptions given to mixed-sex married couples violates the state's constitutional guarantee of equal protection.
- 20 — Don't ask, don't tell, the law which since 1993 has excluded LGB people from serving openly in the United States military, expires nine months after it was legislatively repealed. The United States Army is the first branch of the military to announce officially that the exclusionary policy is over.
- 28 — The European Parliament in Straßburg passed a resolution against discrimination on the basis of sexual orientation.

=== October ===
- 3 — The U.K.'s Identity and Passport Service announces plans to change passport application forms to include options for same-sex parents to identify as "parent one" and "parent two" rather than as "mother" and "father". It would also allow transgender applicants to opt out of selecting a gender for passport purposes.
- 5 — California Governor Jerry Brown signs Seth's Law, requiring school districts across the state have a uniform process for dealing with complaints about bullying and mandating that school personnel intervene, when safe to do so, to stop bullying.
- 8 — Andrew Mitchell, the British Secretary of State for International Development, announced that African countries which persecute homosexuals will face cuts in financial aid from the British government. This followed a cut of £19 million in aid to Malawi after two men were sentenced in 2010 to 14 years' hard labour for attempting to marry (the men were later released after intercession by the United Nations).
- 9 — California Governor Jerry Brown announces the signing of the Gender Nondiscrimination Act (AB 887) and the Vital Statistics Modernization Act (AB 443). AB 887 makes illegal discrimination based on gender identity or expression in employment, education, housing, and other public settings and AB 443 allows transgender people to obtain a court order to protect their gender.
- 25 — The Supreme Federal Court of Brazil ruled in favour of two women seeking a legal civil marriage. It found that "sexual orientation should not serve as a pretext for excluding families from the legal protection that marriage represents."

=== November ===
- 2
  - The U.K. Equalities Commission announced that same-sex couples may use houses of worship in England and Wales for civil partnership ceremonies, although no religious organisation can be forced to perform them.
  - The United States Internal Revenue Service announces that it intends to issue a formal agreement, known as a "notice of acquiescence", with the 2010 United States Tax Court decision in O'Donnabhain v. Commissioner, allowing people to deduct the costs for treating gender identity disorder from their federal income taxes.
- 15 — The Oklahoma City Council votes to ban discrimination based on sexual orientation in city employment.
- 22 — An independent arbiter rules that Baltimore County, Maryland, must extend spousal benefits to the same-sex spouses of two police officers who legally married in other states.

=== December ===
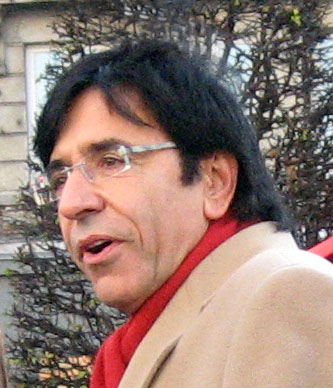
Elio Di Rupo, the first full-time openly gay male national leader, in 2007

- 1 — Australian state Queensland passes in parliament Civil Partnership Bill.
- 6 — Elio Di Rupo of Belgium becomes the first openly gay male leader of a European Union country.

== Deaths ==
- 7 January — Carlos Castro, Portuguese journalist and LGBT rights activist, bludgeoned.
- 15 January — Lance Lundsten, American student, suicide. following alleged school bullying.
- 19 January — Kameron Jacobsen, American student, suicide following alleged bullying on Facebook.
- 26 January — David Kato, Ugandan, LGBT rights activist, bludgeoned.
- 27 February — James Gruber, American LGBT activist, last surviving member of the Mattachine Society, following an illness.
- 28 February — Peter J. Gomes, American theologian and same-sex marriage advocate, complications following a stroke.
- 17 April — Alfred Freedman, American psychiatrist who led the campaign to declassify homosexuality as a mental illness in 1973, complications following surgery.
- 23 April — Noxolo Nogwaza, South African LGBT activist, possible victim of corrective rape, murdered.
- 7 May — Doric Wilson, American playwright and LGBT activist.
- 25 June — Jean Harris, American LGBT rights activist.
- 22 July — Ifti Nasim, Pakistani poet and LGBT rights activist, heart attack.
- 3 August — Rudolf Brazda, German survivor of Buchenwald concentration camp and the last known homosexual internee.
- 11 September — Arthur Evans, author and LGBT rights activist, co-founder of Gay Activists Alliance, heart attack.
- 18 September — Jamey Rodemeyer, United States high school student, suicide following bullying.
- 7 October — Paula Ettelbrick, United States lawyer and LGBT rights activist, cancer.
- 11 October — Frank Kameny, United States LGBT right activist, heart disease.
- 14 October — Jamie Hubley, Canadian student, suicide following depression and bullying.
- 26 October
  - Axel Axgil, Danish LGBT rights activist, complications from a fall.
  - Aristide Laurent, United States LGBT right activist and co-founder of The Advocate magazine, cancer.
- 29 October — Rose Robertson, British, LGBT rights activist, natural causes.
- 7 November — Peter Burton, British journalist and LGBT rights advocate, heart attack.
- 10 November — Barbara Grier, American lesbian rights activist and co-founder of Naiaid Press, cancer.

== See also ==
- Timeline of LGBTQ history – timeline of events from 12,000 BCE to present
- LGBTQ rights by country or territory – current legal status around the world
- LGBTQ social movements
