= Philanthropy and advocacy of Dolly Parton =

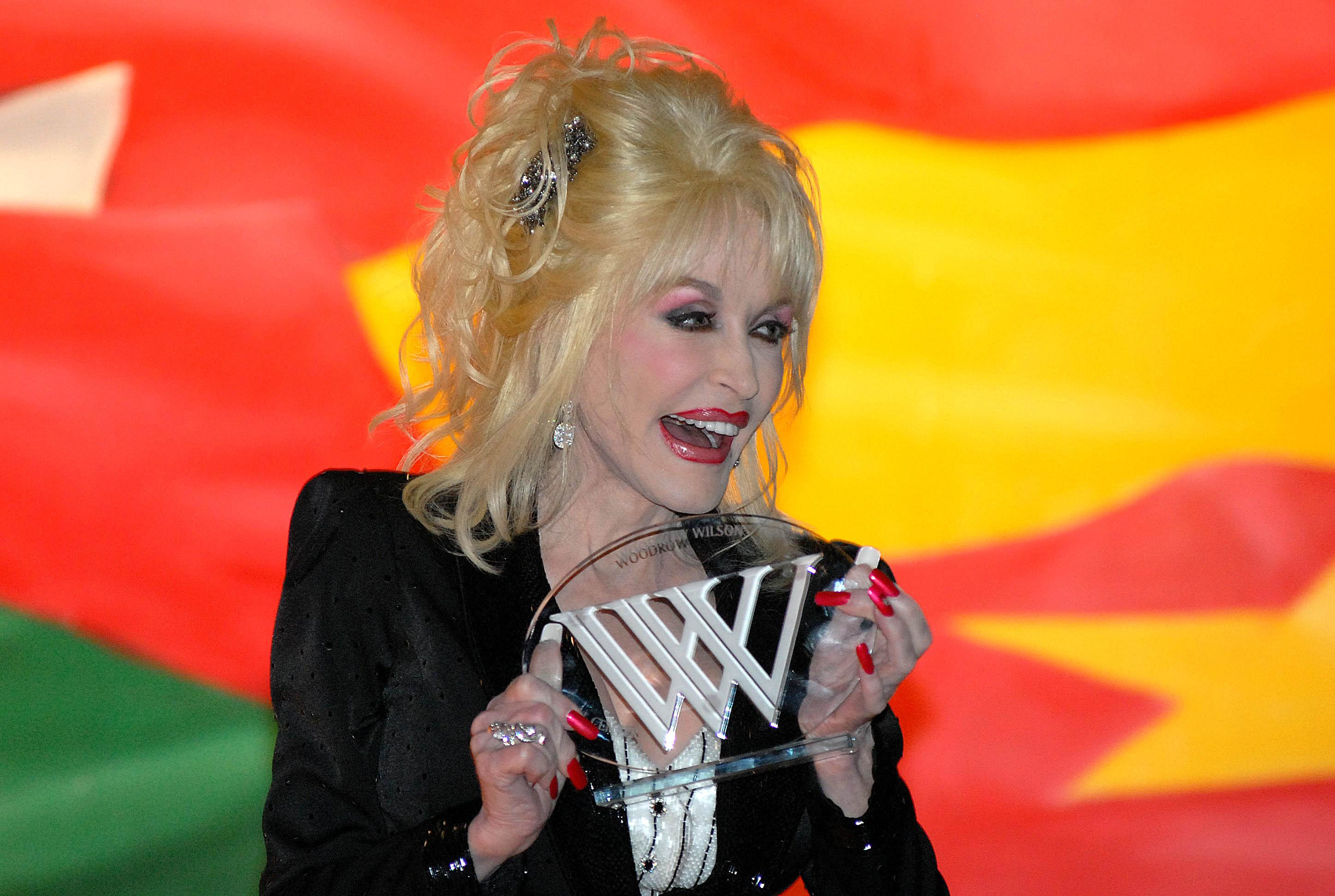
Dolly Parton accepts the Woodrow Wilson Award for Public Service in 2007

American singer-songwriter and actress Dolly Parton was well-known for her philanthropy and public advocacy. Her charitable activities particularly focused on education and childhood literacy, healthcare and medical research, disaster relief, and causes benefiting communities in her native East Tennessee. In support of these efforts she established the Dollywood Foundation in 1988, and Dolly Parton's Imagination Library in 1995. Parton has also publicly advocated for causes including LGBT rights and vaccination.

== Education and literacy ==
In 1988, Parton founded the non-profit Dollywood Foundation, originally to improve educational outcomes among children in her home county of Sevier County, Tennessee. Among the foundation's early efforts was the Buddy Program, in which seventh- and eighth-grade students paired with a friend and pledged to support each other in remaining in school and graduating from high school. Students who graduated received $500. The dropout rate among participating classes fell from 35% to 6%, and the program encouraged the community to develop additional initiatives to sustain the improvement.

Parton's literacy program, Dolly Parton's Imagination Library, is also a part of the Dollywood Foundation, and it was founded in 1995 in honor of her father, who never learned to read or write. It mails one book per month to each enrolled child from the time of their birth until they enter kindergarten. Over 1,600 local communities provide the Imagination Library to almost 850,000 children each month across the U.S., Canada, the UK, Australia and Ireland. In 2002, Parton was bestowed the National State Teachers of the Year organization's inaugural Chasing Rainbows Award, "for her dedication to encouraging a love of reading among children, regardless of socioeconomic status, through the Imagination Library". She there after presented the award annually to subsequent recipients.

In 2006, Parton published a cookbook, Dolly's Dixie Fixin's: Love, Laughter and Lots of Good Food, with all proceeds going toward the Imagination Library.

In February 2018, she donated her 100 millionth free book, a copy of Parton's children's picture book Coat of Many Colors, to the Library of Congress in Washington, D.C. and was honored by the Library on account of the "charity sending out its 100 millionth book".

On the 30th anniversary of the program Roxanne Owens provided a summary of the impact of the initiative for Children and Libraries, the journal of the Association for Library Service to Children.

Starting on February 24, 2022, employees of Dollywood, a theme park co-owned by Parton's entertainment company, who decided to go to college would have their tuition fees, books, and other associated fees, paid for by the theme park. In October 2022, it was revealed that Parton had been paying for the band uniforms for a number of Tennessee high schools for numerous years.

In February 2025, Indiana governor Mike Braun declined to continue a state 50% match for Parton's Imagination Library. Dollywood Foundation President Jeff Conyers said, "We are hopeful that Governor Braun and the Indiana Legislature will continue this vital investment by restoring the state's funding match for local Imagination Library programs." Braun would soon afterwards task his wife Maureen with finding ways to keep the Imagination Library's Indiana chapter alive.

For her work in literacy, Parton received awards including the Association of American Publishers Honors Award (2000), Good Housekeeping Seal of Approval (2001), and Parents as Teachers National Center – Child and Family Advocacy Award (2003). The Chartered Institute of Library and Information Professionals awarded Parton an Honorary Fellowship in 2024.

== Healthcare and medical research ==
Parton worked to raise money for causes including the American Red Cross and HIV/AIDS-related charities.

In December 2006, Parton pledged $500,000 toward a proposed $90 million hospital and cancer center to be constructed in Sevierville, in the name of Robert F. Thomas, the physician who delivered her. She announced a benefit concert to raise additional funds for the project. The concert played to about 8,000 people.

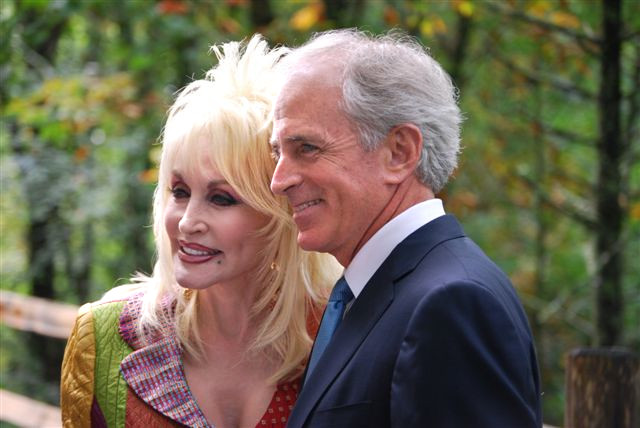
Parton with U.S. Senator Bob Corker at the rededication ceremony for the Great Smoky Mountains National Park in September 2009

Parton was a generous donor to Vanderbilt University Medical Center (VUMC). Among her gifts was a contribution to the Monroe Carell Jr. Children's Hospital at Vanderbilt Pediatric Cancer Program in honor of a friend, Naji Abumrad and her niece, Hannah Dennison, who was successfully treated for leukemia as a child at the Children's Hospital.

Parton also made "generational and transformational" donations of undisclosed amounts to the East Tennessee Children's Hospital, according to the hospital's president and chief executive officer. The hospital was later renamed the Dolly Parton Children's Hospital.

=== Breast cancer ===
In 2020, Parton joined Monica, Jordin Sparks, Rita Wilson, and Sara Evans in recording the benefit single "PINK", to raise awareness and funds for Susan G. Komen. Komen received a portion of the royalties from sales, streams and downloads of the recording. In October 2021, Parton headlined the inaugural Kiss Breast Cancer Goodbye benefit concert at the Country Music Hall of Fame, performing an hour-long acoustic set to raise funds and awareness for Komen's breast-cancer programs.

In 2023, Susan G. Komen presented Parton with its Promise Award, which recognizes philanthropy, advocacy, and commitment to people affected by breast cancer. The organization cited her participation in "PINK" and the Kiss Breast Cancer Goodbye concert, as well as her broader use of her public profile to raise awareness of the disease.

=== COVID-19 vaccine and other infectious disease research ===
In April 2020, in response to the COVID-19 pandemic, Parton donated $1 million towards research at Vanderbilt University Medical Center (VUMC) and encouraged those who can afford it to make similar donations. She said "I'm a very proud girl today to know I had anything at all to do with something that's going to help us through this crazy pandemic." Her donation funded the critical early stages of development of the Moderna vaccine.

In March 2021, Parton was publicly vaccinated against COVID-19 at Vanderbilt University. She labeled her social media accounts of the occasion "Dolly gets a dose of her own medicine." Parton strongly encouraged everyone to get vaccinated when eligible and performed a song celebrating her vaccination, set to the tune of her song "Jolene".

Parton expanded her support for infectious-disease research in June 2022 with an additional $1 million donation to VUMC, this time to its Division of Pediatric Infectious Diseases. The gift supported research into how viruses and bacteria cause disease, prevention of antibiotic resistance, prevention and treatment of infections, particularly infections affecting children undergoing cancer treatment, and the global effects of childhood infectious diseases.

== Community aid and disaster relief ==
The Dollywood Foundation, funded from Parton's profits, brought jobs and tax revenues to a previously depressed region.

In response to the 2016 Great Smoky Mountains wildfires, Parton was one of the country music artists who participated in a telethon to raise money for victims of the fires. This was held in Nashville on December 9. Parton hosted her own telethon for the victims on December 13 and reportedly raised around $9 million. Her fund, the "My People Fund", provided $1,000 a month for six months to over 900 families affected by the wildfires, culminating with $5,000 to each home in the final month due to increased fundraising, totaling $10,000 per family.

In 2018, the FBI honored Parton for her wildfire aid, awarding her the 2018 Director's Community Leadership Award in a ceremony at FBI Headquarters. The honor was bestowed by Director Christopher Wray and was accepted on Parton's behalf by David Dotson, the CEO of the Dollywood Foundation.

The impact of the fund's financial relief for the 2016 wildfire victims was studied by University of Tennessee College of Social Work professor Stacia West, who examined the impact of cash transfers on poverty alleviation. West surveyed 100 recipients of the emergency relief funds in April 2017 on topics including housing, financial impact, physical and emotional health and sources of support, with a follow-up survey conducted in December 2017. West found that the "My People Fund", in tandem with traditional disaster response, gave families the ability to make decisions that were most beneficial to them and concluded that unconditional cash support may be more beneficial for disaster relief than conditional financial support. The report cited the impact of the monthly financial disbursements from the "My People Fund" on residents' emergency savings: "Following the monthly disbursements of unconditional cash assistance, participants were able to return to baseline financial stability reported prior to the wildfire and improve their ability to set aside savings for hypothetical future emergencies."

In the aftermath of 2024's Hurricane Helene, Parton announced a donation of $2 million to relief efforts, $1 million personally and another $1 million through her various businesses and the Dollywood Foundation.

== Animal welfare and conservation ==
In 2003, her efforts to preserve the bald eagle through the American Eagle Foundation's sanctuary at Dollywood earned her the Partnership Award from the U.S. Fish and Wildlife Service.

In 2006, Parton and Emmylou Harris allowed use of their music in a PETA ad campaign that encouraged pet owners to keep their dogs indoors rather than chained outside.

== LGBTQ+ advocacy ==
Though often politically neutral, Parton was known for her long history of openly supporting the gay community, and her example helped pave the way for Reba McEntire, Shania Twain, and younger country artists to do the same. Parton publicly came out in support of same-sex marriage in 2009. She also voiced her support for the trans community after a series of anti-trans measures came into law in Tennessee in 2023. The Tennessee Equality Project described her as "the outsider who made it big by being herself, and leading with love". They said the LGBTQ community "always felt that she had our back, and it mattered".

== Recognition ==
In addition to the awards Parton received specifically for her efforts toward promoting literacy, Parton also received recognition for her general philanthropical work.

On November 8, 2007, Parton received the Woodrow Wilson Award for Public Service from the Woodrow Wilson International Center for Scholars of the Smithsonian Institution at a ceremony in Nashville.

On May 8, 2009, Parton gave the commencement speech at the graduation ceremony for the University of Tennessee, Knoxville's College of Arts and Sciences. During the ceremony, she received an honorary Doctor of Humane Letters from the university. It was only the second honorary degree given by the university and in presenting the degree, the university's Chancellor, Jimmy Cheek, said, "Because of her career not just as a musician and entertainer, but for her role as a cultural ambassador, philanthropist and lifelong advocate for education, it is fitting that she be honored with an honorary degree from the flagship educational institution of her home state."

In 2009, she was bestowed the Daughters of the American Revolution Founders Medal for Education.

Awards bestowed upon Parton reflecting her philanthropic and humanitarian work include:

Organization	Year	Award	Ref.
Sevierville Chamber of Commerce	1989	Citizen of the Year	
Association of American Publishers	2000	Honors Award	
American Association of School Administrators	2002	Galaxy Award	
Good Housekeeping Seal of Approval	2001	Seal of Approval	
National State Teachers of the Year	2002	Chasing Rainbows Award	
Parents as Teachers National Center	2003	Child and Family Advocacy Award	
United States Fish and Wildlife Service	2003	Partnership Award	
American Legion	2004	James V. Day Good Guy Award	
NashvilleREAD	2004	Reading Works Award	
Stennis Center for Public Service	2006	Lindy Boggs Award	
The Tennessean	2006	Tennessean of the Year	
Woodrow Wilson International Center for Scholars of the Smithsonian Institution	2007	Woodrow Wilson Public Service Award	
Daughters of the American Revolution	2009	Founders Medal for Education	
The Tennessean	2016	Tennessean of the Year	
Academy of Country Music Awards	2017	Gary Haber Lifting Lives Award	
MusiCares	2019	MusiCares Person of the Year	
Susan G. Komen for the Cure	2023	Promise Award	
Chartered Institute of Library and Information Professionals	2024	Honorary Fellowship	
