= Jean Harris (disambiguation) =

Jean Harris (1923–2012) was an American educator and convicted murderer.

Jean Harris may also refer to:

- Jean Harris (activist) (1944–2011), American lesbian activist
- Jean Cole Harris (1926-2015), American journalist
- Jean Harris (environmentalist) (1922–2008), American environmentalist
- Jean Thomson Harris (1883–1963), wife of Paul Harris, a lawyer who founded the first Rotary Club
- Jean L. Harris (1931–2001), American physician and politician
- Jean Harris (politician), Nevisian politician

in fiction:

- Jean Harris (Coronation Street), a fictional character on Coronation Street

== See also ==
- Jeanne Harris, American author and academic
- Gene Harris (disambiguation)
