= Tennessee House Bill 878 =

Proposed state law in Tennessee, US

Tennessee General Assembly
- Enacted by: Tennessee House of Representatives
- Enacted by: Tennessee Senate

Legislative history

First chamber: Tennessee House of Representatives
- Introduced by: Monty Fritts
- Passed: March 6, 2023
- Voting summary: 74 voted for; 22 voted against

Second chamber: Tennessee Senate
- Member(s) in charge: Mark Pody

Tennessee House Bill 878 is a state law in the U.S. state of Tennessee, granting an individual the right to refuse to solemnize a marriage if the individual has a religious or conscience-based objection to that partnership. The law was passed in 2024 and signed into law by Governor Bill Lee.

The law would thus allow wedding officiants to legally discriminate against couples entering interracial unions, heterosexual unions and same-sex marriages. According to its critics, the bill is vaguely worded in order "to invite a Kim Davis-type lawsuit to go up against Obergefell" and test existing marriage equality case law.

The Senate sponsor, Republican Sen. Mark Pody, stated in 2015 that God had called on him to stop same-sex marriages. Previously, Pody sponsored the Tennessee Natural Marriage Defense Act in 2019, which would have prohibited government officials from facilitating same-sex marriages. The House sponsor, Rep. Monty Fritts stated, "This bill was designed to be simply and clearly to protect the rights of the officiate or officiates of wedding ceremonies."

== Public reactions ==
In reaction to both Tennessee House Bill 878 and Tennessee Senate Bill 3, Sara Warbelow, the legal director of the Human Rights Campaign, stated, “Instead of focusing on the issues that Tennesseans actually care about, radical politicians are wasting their time, and using their power, to target the LGBTQ+ community. These bills are not about protecting children and they are not about religious freedom. They are about stripping away the basic human rights that LGBTQ+ people have fought for over decades.”

== See also ==
- LGBT rights in Tennessee
