= Tennessee Adult Entertainment Act =

Tennessee law to ban drag performance in front of minors

Tennessee General Assembly
- Enacted by: Tennessee Senate
- Enacted by: Tennessee House of Representatives
- Signed by: Bill Lee
- Signed: March 2, 2023

Legislative history

Initiating chamber: Tennessee Senate
- Introduced by: Jack Johnson
- Passed: February 9, 2023
- Voting summary: 26 voted for; 6 voted against

Revising chamber: Tennessee House of Representatives
- Member(s) in charge: Chris Todd
- Passed: February 23, 2023
- Voting summary: 74 voted for; 19 voted against
- Status: In force

The Tennessee Adult Entertainment Act, also known as the Tennessee drag ban, was an anti-drag bill, which banned public "adult cabaret performance" in public or in front of children in the state of Tennessee. The act was vague in what it considered an "adult cabaret performance" although it defined it as a "male or female impersonators who provide entertainment that appeals to a prurient interest."

It was the first anti-drag act to pass a state legislature in the United States, and was the first to be signed into law. The act was signed on March 2, 2023, by Governor Bill Lee, becoming Public Chapter No. 2 of the Tennessee Code. It was criticized for being overly vague and authoritarian.

Critics have suggested that the legislation was a direct reaction to the circulation of footage from the 2022 Franklin Pride festival online, pointing to the similar language used in a 2023 attempt to deny a permit to Franklin Pride: "Some members of the town launched a campaign to deny a permit for this year's event, describing it as a threat to children." Nashville's News Channel 5 reported that "a majority of the board wanted to wait for a community decency resolution to come up for a vote before the permit approval."

The house's bill sponsor, Chris Todd, introduced the measure in that chamber after he fought a public Pride show in Jackson, TN, claiming that drag is inherently inappropriate for minors.

One news agency traced the possible origin to a complaint about footage of the debut of drag king persona Witchcraft’D recorded at Tennessee Tech University's Backdoor Playhouse. When conservative activist and founder of Freedom Forever, Landon Starbuck, viewed the video and stole the video from the performer's page, she posted an overly edited version of the video to Twitter to encourage complaints to the university.

It was challenged on March 27, 2023, by Friends of George's, an LGBTQ+ theatre troupe in Memphis, Tennessee.

On April 1, 2023, federal judge Tommy Parker for the United States District Court for the Western District of Tennessee temporarily blocked the implementation of the act, citing First Amendment concerns. The temporary injunction was changed to a permanent injunction on June 2, 2023.

Attorney General Jonathan Skrmetti filed a notice of appeal on June 30, 2023. The Sixth Circuit heard oral arguments at a hearing on February 1, 2024. On July 18, 2024, a three judge panel on the Sixth Circuit reinstated the law by ruling that the plaintiffs had lacked the standing to sue. The ruling did not address whether the law was constitutional.

== Bill contents ==
Section 1 of the Tennessee Adult Entertainment Act bans "topless dancers, go-go dancers, exotic dancers, strippers, male or female impersonators" in the presence of minors. It would modify Tennessee Annotated Code § 7-51-1401 by adding a delineated section for the definition of a performance of adult cabaret. Specifically, the performance would (1) take place outside of an establishment licensed for that purpose, and (2) not be required to be intended as a performance.

Section 2 of the Act specifically mentions § 7-51-1406 with the intent of overriding that section of existing Tennessee law entirely – but only as it respects the named persons. This section would prevent any "adult cabaret performance," as defined in section 1, on public property or in front of "a person who is not an adult." With respect to § 7-51-1406, the bills are worded so that any existing law permitting the named actions, or any license that had been issued to permit them (such as a permit for a Pride Festival) would be rescinded. Additionally, it sought to prevent any future licenses or laws from being granted or enacted.

This section also lists the penalties to be incurred. A first offense would be considered a Class A Misdemeanor, with each subsequent offense being considered a Class E Felony. This would supersede § 7-51-1404, which lists penalties as starting as a Class B Misdemeanor "punishable only by a fine of five hundred dollars ($500)" with subsequent offenses being considered Class A Misdemeanors. As listed in § 40-35-111, a Class A Misdemeanor allows for imprisonment just shy of one year, a fine of $2500, or both. A Class E Felony has a minimum mandatory sentence of one year but cannot exceed six years, and a jury cannot assess a fine in excess of $3000.

Section 3 stated that the bills would take effect on July 1, 2023.

Both SB3 and HB9 are identical in their content. Both specifically list the above named persons appealing to "the prurient interest," an acknowledgement of the decision in Miller v. California (1973).

== Public Chapter No. 2 contents ==
The law as signed reads slightly differently than SB3 / HB9. It adds the phrase "or similar entertainers" behind the list of persons enumerated as being featured in "adult cabaret entertainment". It modifies the wording of section 1 to state that the defined "cabaret performances" are harmful to minors, removing the wording specifying that the entertainment had to appeal to the prurient interest entirely.

Section 2 is identical in its wording to SB3 / HB9, including the provisions prohibiting performance on public property and the punishments for a violation of the ordinance.

Section 3 signed the bill into law as of April 1, 2023, adding that it would apply "to prohibited conduct occurring on or after that date."

== Public reactions ==
=== To TN SB3 / HB9 / Public Chapter No. 2 ===
The bill sparked outrage from the LGBT community.

==== Local response ====
When the bill was still being debated, individuals attending the legislative sessions were unsuccessful in getting legislators to define the terms "public space" or "female impersonator". A protest rally called "Have a Heart Tennessee" brought dozens of protestors to the Cordell Hull building in Nashville during the House Criminal Justice Committee hearing on HB9.

Spencer Lyst, a 17-year-old Tennessean and member of Franklin Pride's advisory board, said in the Board of Mayor and Aldermen meeting on April 11, 2023, "Community decency starts with not tearing down our neighbors because we don't agree with them." Lyst continued, pointing out that only one of the members of the council at the BOMA meeting had attended the Franklin Pride festival in 2022, despite the Board in general condemning the event.

Joslyn Fish, owner of South Press Coffee in Knoxville, said, "It's not about getting the law to stick. It's about fear."

MTSU political science professor Kent Syler responded to the signing by saying, "It has become a social issues arms race for the GOP in Tennessee."

Hunter Kelly, host of Apple Music's Proud Radio and based in Nashville, commented, "You can’t eradicate queer people. We just are. We always have been, and we always will be."

Nashvillian Jason Isbell stated, "These bills add up to an attempt to eradicate a valuable part of our community and force good people to live in fear."

Former Nashville mayor Megan Barry commented, "This is unbelievable. So much hate and fear – of what? Just when I think these Republican legislators can’t come up with another way to deflect from REAL problems facing Tennesseans – they do!"

Democrat Heidi Campbell said in February 2023, just after the state senate approved SB3, "Leveraging fear of others may be politically advantageous, but it's the antithesis of good governance."

East Tennessee native and drag performer Eureka O'Hara recalled her own experiences in years past and in an interview with Scott Simon of NPR commented, "I just think that they are pigeonholing all types of drag into this one negative sexual connotation to instill fear." In response to how the bill was couched and promoted as protecting children, she added, "I don't know any past history where kids were affected negatively by drag queens performing in public." At the end of her essay in Time, O'Hara wrote, "Drag is not meant to be serious. But the false accusations of harm done to children and the blatant disregard for who we are is very serious."

In an editorial published by The Guardian, former Friends of George's member Bella DuBalle pointed out some hard truths, among them that, in 2022, the Southern Baptist Convention made publicly available a list of 700 ministers in the US who engaged in sexual abuse. Forty of those were in Tennessee. She followed this up by saying, "There is no record, not a single documented instance, of a child ever being harmed or abused at a drag show." She also pointed out that Senator Jack Johnson, who introduced SB3 in the legislature, was also the loudest voice in trying to abolish the Tennessee Commission on Children and Youth, which is the state's independent child advocacy commission. DuBalle asked, "How is this protecting children?"

The night after Lee signed the bill into law, Kelsea Ballerini brought three drag queens onto stage with her live at the CMT Music Awards, singing the song "If You Go Down (I'm Goin' Down Too)" alongside them.

A press release from the ACLU chapter in Tennessee pointed out that the vague nature of the law would allow for government officials to use their own subjective perspective in enforcing it, while also stating, "I want to be abundantly clear: the law that was just signed does not make it illegal to perform in drag in Tennessee. The law bans obscene performances, and drag performances are not inherently obscene."

==== National response ====
In New York, the LGBTQ+ community planned protests the week of March 12, 2023 in response to Tennessee's SB3/HB9, as well as several other anti-LGBT laws. When interviewed about the bills, New York drag queen Peppermint noted that the Tennessee bill in particular was "insidious" because of the vague wording. She also said, "Given that there was a recent Pew poll that says that most individuals – I think as many as 80 percent of Americans said that they didn't personally know someone who's trans, they're getting a lot of their information about us from the same politicians that are making up this discriminatory language."

In response to the law's signing, White House Press Secretary Karine Jean-Pierre stated, "Instead of doing anything to address the real issues that are impacting American people, right now you have a governor from Tennessee that has decided to go after drag shows. What sense does that make to go after drag shows? How is that going to help people's lives?" She continued, saying, "It's part of a larger pattern from elected officials who espouse freedom and liberty but apparently think that freedom of speech only extends to people who agree with them."

In an Instagram post and on TikTok, RuPaul called the bill "a classic distraction technique, distracting us away from the real issues that they were voted into office to focus on: jobs, health care, keeping our children safe from harm at their own school." RuPaul and the producers of his show, World of Wonder co-founders Randy Barbarto and Fenton Bailey, along with broadcasting network MTV, also encouraged people to donate to the Drag Defense Fund, which they created in response to this bill.

Mark Ruffalo referenced RuPaul in echoing the sentiment about registering to vote and showing up to the election. He also encouraged his followers on Mastadon to look at nonprofit organizations supporting LGTBQ+ rights, specifically including not only GLAAD and the ACLU, but also naming Tennessee, Florida, and Texas equality projects.

Juanita More commented, "Bills like this are out of 'The Handmaid's Tale'."

Frankie James Grande tweeted, "This is political theatre designed to encourage vigilante violence against a group of people that’s already incredibly vulnerable."

Hayley Williams responded to the introduction of the bill with, "Once again our state has passed two regressive and unfathomably harmful bills." At Love Rising, a benefit concert held after Lee signed SB3 / HB9 into law, she added, "What they’re doing with this drag bill and how really it’s actually just a distraction from all these other horrible things that they’re trying to pass here. It feels like we’re in a relationship with our city and our state that’s like all give, no get."

The B-52s released a public statement, proclaiming, "It is unacceptable that in the 21st century, we are witnessing such blatant attempts to undermine the rights of individuals based on their gender identity and sexual orientation."

Cyndi Lauper compared those proposing anti-LGBT bills to Nazis, stating, "Equality for everybody, or nobody’s really equal. This is how Hitler started, you know, just weeding everybody out. And then finally he... You know. I don't think it's a good idea, what they're doing."

Jamie Lee Curtis declared her support of the trans community in an Instagram post on March 5, saying, "The right’s war on queer people, most specifically trans people, is both bizarre and abhorrent."

Kevin Bacon and Kyra Sedgwick posted a viral video on Twitter and TikTok, which he prefaced with, "#DragBans are bad karma." In his TikTok video, he then went on to encourage viewers to donate to the Drag Defense Fund.

When announcing a date added on to her Celebration Tour where she would be in Nashville, Madonna commented, "[T]hese so-called laws to protect our children are unfounded and pathetic." The tour features Bob the Drag Queen as opener.

Silver Lake, L.A. drag performer Maebe A. Girl warned that this is likely a precursor to an introduction of these policies on a national level, saying, "It has nothing to do with children. They want LGBTQIA people out of sight, out of mind."

Eater reporter Jaya Saxena reacted on record, saying, "[T]hese are the bill's intended effects: make people reconsider their business plans, worry for their safety, and calculate whether participating in queer life is worth it."

Actors Equity responded to anti-LGBT legislation in general with, "The recent rise in legislation limiting gender-affirming health care, as well as the increase in both physical and legal threats to drag performances, must be named for what they are: a coordinated attack that seeks to eradicate transgender people."

Abbie Callahan wrote a song, "Drag, Queen", in protest of the bill being enacted.

==== Charity endeavors ====
===== Drag Defense Fund =====
In addition to the Instagram post, RuPaul responded to the TAEA by helping to found the Drag Defense Fund alongside World of Wonder and MTV. The fund is maintained by the ACLU.

Randy Barbarto said, "We've usually steered clear of being overtly political." He went on to state that RuPaul has commented that his simply "batting an eyelash" was a political statement, adding, "But as we've been watching the vitriol grow and the number of bills increasing, it just felt like there must be a way to fight back." Fenton Bailey added, "And it’s not just our civil rights… we’re like the canary in the coal mine. If they succeed with this, they’re coming for other communities too."

In an interview with Out magazine, Barbarto and Bailey noted that there has been "tremendous interest" in the fund since its launch. The Manhattan Association of Cabarets publicly announced a donation to the fund, and the ACLU received donations at DragCon L.A. 2023 totaling $40,000.

Additional events to raise donations for the fund were held by The Black Hart (April 13, 2023); Casey Borghesi at Bar Nine (May 16, 2023); and Grindr and MISTR, at six gay bars across the US (June 15, 2023).

Congressman Robert Garcia, after the US House passed a bill opposing the participation of trans women in women's sports in April, commented in support of the fund, "Whether it was Stonewall or whether it was the early Pride marches, whether it’s raising money during the AIDS crisis, it was always drag queens and trans people leading those efforts. That’s something that should never be forgotten."

On May 7, 2023, numerous prominent drag performers participated in a livestream telethon called Drag Isn't Dangerous to raise funds to benefit seven charities that work to support and protect LGBTQ+ rights. Prior to the start of the livestream, a GoFundMe account was established to receive donations. Prior to the telethon's opening act, the account had already received more than $100,000. The donations were split between the selected charities, including the Drag Defense Fund. The total raised exceeded $500,000.

===== "Love Rising" at Bridgestone Arena =====
Jason Isbell and Allison Russell, both Nashville residents, along with the Americana Music Association, Live Nation Women, Apple Music's Proud Radio, Red Light Management, and many others, organized a benefit concert in light of Lee signing SB3/HB9 into law. Announced on March 8, 2023, Love Rising took place on March 20, 2023, at Bridgestone Arena, with proceeds benefiting local LGBTQ+ groups. It was also offered via livestream. Brandi Carlile's The Looking Out Foundation vowed to match donations made through their platform in their announcement of the event.

The event did not use the word "drag" or refer to drag performances in the promotional poster. Instead, it was advertised with the phrases "Let freedom sing" and "A celebration of Life, Liberty, and the Pursuit of Happiness." The show raised over $500,000, with proceeds benefiting Tennessee Equality Project, Inclusion Tennessee, OUTMemphis, and the Tennessee Pride Chamber.

===== "We Will Always Be" at City Winery =====
The night following Love Rising, a smaller event took place at City Winery in Nashville to benefit Inclusion Tennessee. City Winery worked with Hunter Kelly of Proud Radio and with the Black Opry to organize the performance. Lauren Polley, the program director for City Winery, vowed, "We will not be detoured by any false, bigoted legislation. We’re an inclusive venue that celebrates diversity and amplifies voices that need to be heard."

=== To Judge Parker's decision ===
While the LGBTQ+ community celebrated the ruling, including at the previously scheduled Franklin Pride Festival, legislators of both political parties weighed in on the injunction.

The bill's sponsor, state Senator Jack Johnson, responded by saying, "We're not going to let the courts dictate what is public policy in the state of Tennessee." State Representative Jason Zachery reacted with, "We will continue to take every step necessary to ensure children in our state are not subjected to public acts of perversion."

Attorney General Johnathan Skrmetti asserted that the injunction actually only applies to Shelby County, Tennessee, and the law remains in effect in the remainder of the state. This interpretation of the ruling is a result of Shelby County District attorney Steve Mulroy being a named defendant in the initial filing. With respect to whether the law remains enforceable in the rest of the state, Governor Lee said he would defer to Skrmetti. Skrmetti has filed an appeal to the Sixth Circuit.

After the injunction, Representative Gloria Johnson remarked, "[I]t's very frustrating because we told them in committee that this bill was unconstitutional. We said it in committee, we said it in meetings, we said it on the house floor. If you read the bill and you read the constitution, you know that this bill is unconstitutional."

Democrat Heidi Campbell responded to questions about the law after Judge Parker's permanent injunction, saying, "The law is obviously meant just to be hateful because the obscenity statute already covers this," and continuing, "what it’s really done is have a chilling effect on our LGBTQ community and our vibrant drag community."

== Pending litigation ==
=== Appeals ===
In August 2023, the Blount County District Attorney, Ryan K. Desmond, sent a letter to organizers of a pride event scheduled for September 2, 2023 to advise them that he subscribes to Skrmetti's interpretation of Judge Parker's ruling and that the ruling only applies to Shelby County. The ACLU filed suit, and U.S. District Judge Ronnie Greer ruled in favor of the event organizers and issued an injunction to prevent DA Desmond from interfering with the festival. Greer also noted that Desmond even agreed in his filings with the court in defense of the suit brought by Blount County Pride and organizer Flamy Grant that the event posed no harm to children.

SCOTUS issued a statement on November 16, 2023, refusing to reinstate a Florida law that similarly targeted drag shows. That case, Griffen v. HM Florida-ORL, LLC, is scheduled for trial in June 2024. An injunction had been ordered on imposing Florida's law by U.S. District Judge Gregory Presnell.

Both the Tennessee cases and the Florida case are still pending final judgement, with Attorneys General from South Carolina, Idaho, and Alabama, as well as 14 other states supporting Skrmetti's appeal of Judge Parker's ruling. The sixth circuit heard arguments at a hearing on February 1, 2024. On July 18, 2024, a three judge panel on the Sixth Circuit reinstated the law by ruling that the plaintiffs had lacked the standing to sue. The ruling did not address whether the law was constitutional.

=== Other litigation ===
On October 6, 2023, the ACLU-TN filed a lawsuit on behalf of the Tennessee Equality Project against the city of Murfreesboro. At issue is an ordinance which was worded in such a way that it arguably banned being homosexual in public. According to the complaint, officials in Murfreesboro engaged in a concerted effort to prevent members of the Tennessee Equality Project from exercising their First Amendment rights. The ordinance (23-O-22) also resulted in the establishment of a tiered library system at Linebaugh Public Library, and has already resulted in the banning of at least four books containing LGBTQ content. The case is being heard by U.S. District Judge Waverly D. Crenshaw, whose order on October 20, 2023, stated that the city could not enforce code that included the term 'homosexuality' in the definition of 'sexual conduct'. As a result, the city council voted to remove the term 'homosexuality' from the civil code, but the amendment to the civil code changing the wording didn't go into effect until November 17, 2023. The case was set for jury trial, to begin on May 14, 2024, but settled on February 7, 2024. The city of Murfreesboro agreed to pay $500,000 and repeal the ordinance, and both parties filed for dismissal.

In addition to the appeal AG Skrmetti has filed in Friends of George's v. State of TN, another lawsuit has been filed in the Southern District of California. Hannah Miyamoto v. Bill Lee, Johnathan Skrmetti, and Glenn R. Funk, case number 3:23cv-00233, argues that Ms. Miyamoto would be unable to perform her play, Twelve Nights with Viola and Olivia, as it, like Shakespeare's Twelfth Night from which it takes its inspiration, involves Viola impersonating a man. Glenn R. Funk is the Nashville DA at the time of the suit's filing. Nashville is in Davidson County.

== See also ==
- Censorship in the United States
- Democratic backsliding in the United States
- Drag panic
- LGBTQ rights in Tennessee
