= Public accommodations in the United States =

US legal term for public or private facilities that are used by the public at large

In United States law, public accommodations are generally defined as facilities, whether publicly or privately owned, that are used by the public at large. Examples include retail stores, rental establishments, and service establishments as well as educational institutions, recreational facilities, and service centers.

Under U.S. federal law, public accommodations must be accessible to disabled people and may not discriminate on the basis of "race, color, religion, or national origin". Private clubs were specifically exempted under federal law as well as religious organizations. The definition of public accommodation within the Title II of the Civil Rights Act of 1964 is limited to "any inn, hotel, motel, or other establishment which provides lodging to transient guests" and so is inapplicable to churches, mosques, synagogues, et al. Section 12187 of the ADA also exempts religious organizations from public accommodation laws, but religious organizations are encouraged to comply.

Most U.S. states have various laws (non-uniform) that provide for nondiscrimination in public accommodations, and some may be broader than federal law.

== Federal law ==
Federal legislation dealing with public accommodations include these:

- Title II of the Civil Rights Act of 1964
- Title III of the Americans with Disabilities Act of 1990

== State laws ==
Many states and their subdivisions prohibited discrimination in places of public accommodation prior to the enactment of Title II of the Civil Rights Act of 1964. By 1964, 31 states had such laws, many dating back to the late 19th century. As of 2015, 45 states have an anti-discrimination public accommodation law for nondisabled individuals. The laws all protect against discrimination based upon race, gender, ethnicity, and religion. There are 19 states that prohibit discrimination in public accommodation based upon age.

Because a right to public accommodation for gay and transgender people does not exist in federal law, in more than half the states in the U.S., discrimination in public accommodation against LGBT people remains legal.

Several states also have protections for breastfeeding in public. In addition several states provide for non-discrimination in public accommodation when based upon sexual orientation and gender identity.

Private clubs were exempted under federal law but not in many states' laws. For example, in interpreting a Minnesota law in their 1984 ruling Roberts v. United States Jaycees, the United States Supreme Court declared the previously all-male United States Junior Chamber, a chamber of commerce organization for men between the ages of 18 and 36, to be a public accommodation, thus compelling it to admit women.

== See also ==
- Anti-discrimination law
- Civil Rights Act of 1875
- List of cities and counties in the United States offering an LGBT non-discrimination ordinance
- Reasonable accommodation
- Masterpiece Cakeshop v. Colorado Civil Rights Commission
