= Tennessee Senate Bill 1556 =

2016 Tennessee law

Senate Bill 1556 (SB 1556), officially called An act to amend Tennessee Code Annotated, Title 4; Title 49 and Title 63, relative to conscientious objections to the provision of counseling and therapy, is a 2016 anti-LGBT law in the state of Tennessee that allows licensed counselors in private practice to terminate care or refer away clients because of moral objections to how the client identifies.

== Passage ==
On April 6, 2016, the Tennessee House of Representatives passed SB 1556, with 71 yeas and 21 nays. On April 11, 2016, the Tennessee Senate passed SB 1556, with 25 yeas and 6 nays. On April 27, 2016, Governor Bill Haslam signed SB 1556 into law as Pub. Ch. 926.

== Reaction ==
On January 1, 2017, California barred state-funded travel to Tennessee for enacting statutes that critics charge discriminate against members of the LGBT community.

== See also ==
- LGBT rights in Tennessee
