= Abbie Callahan =

American country singer-songwriter (born 2001)

- Born: September 17, 2001 (age 25); Iowa City, Iowa
- Education: Belmont University
- Genre: Country

Abbie Callahan (born September 17, 2001) is an American country singer-songwriter. She is known for her songs in a genre she calls "kaleidoscope country", with elements of Americana, folk, bluegrass, country, and pop music. She released her first EP, Grossly Aware, in 2025, and her second, And For My Next Trick..., in 2026.

== Biography ==
Abbie Callahan was born on September 17, 2001, and raised in Iowa City, Iowa. From a young age, she was interested in becoming a surgeon. At the same time, however, she found herself passionate about music, competing in school talent shows. She also regularly participated in both county and state fairs, and learned how to play guitar for the fairs. She began posting her singing on Instagram at 13 under the handle Me and My Music, and competed in The Voice and American Idol: she did not pass the audition phase in The Voice, and was eliminated at the second round in American Idol. At 16, she decided to pursue music professionally.

She attended Belmont University in Nashville, where she studied songwriting, and graduated in May 2023. In 2023, she stated her goal was to use music to "not think about politics or the world around us too much". During her time in college, she performed on Nashville Broadway. She released her first EP, Grossly Aware, in 2025. That same year, she appeared at CMA Fest, AmericanaFest, and Bonnaroo. Her song "Simon Says" also went viral.

She launched her first tour, "The OptiMYSTIC Tour", in 2026, named after a single by the same name. The single was described as "ethereal" by Goldmine Magazine. She also released her second EP, And For My Next Trick..., which was stated to go in a "darker direction", that same year.

Her songs often emphasize marijuana use and heavily feature content regarding LGBTQ+ people, such as "Drag, Queen", a song created to criticize the Tennessee Adult Entertainment Act that heavily restricted drag performance and including lines like "I feel bad that you feel bad enough to be that rude." and "Marry Jane", which she stated is about "both" marijuana use and lesbian relationships.

She has defined her genre as "Kaleidoscope country", and stated it includes elements of Americana, folk, bluegrass, country, and pop music. She has also listed it as being a "little psychedelic".

She has partnered with candle company Good Scentiments in 2025 to create a "Kaleidoscope Candle", named after her genre. A portion of the proceeds are set to go to a domestic violence shelter in Nashville. She was named to Country Now's Country Next in 2025.

On September 25, 2026, she made her debut at the Grand Ole Opry. She is set to open for Orville Peck's Man Called Mule Tour on its North America leg in October and November 2026.
