= Gene Harris (disambiguation) =

Gene Harris (1933–2000) was an American pianist.

Gene or Eugene Harris may also refer to:

- Eugene Harris (basketball) (born 1955), former college basketball coach and player
- Gene Harris (baseball) (born 1964), former Major League Baseball player
- Eugene Vernon Harris (1913–1978), American photographer

== See also ==
- Gene Harris of the Three Sounds, a 1972 album by American pianist Gene Harris
- Jean Harris (disambiguation)
