= Thomas H. Davenport =

American academic and author (born 1954)

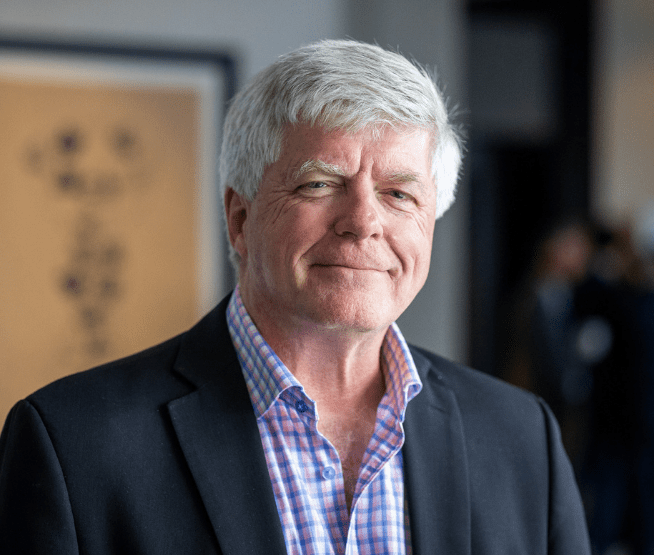
- Davenport in 2025
- Born: Thomas Hayes Davenport, Jr. October 17, 1954 (age 71)
- Other name: Tom Davenport
- Occupations: Academic; author; consultant
- Years active: 1980–present
- Known for: His research on business analytics and knowledge management
- Title: President's Distinguished Professor of IT and Management
- Children: 2 (Hayes Davenport, Chase Davenport)
- Awards: Research.com Leader Award (2022, 2023), Analytics Hall of Fame (2019), NASSCOM Global Leadership Award (2014), C. Jackson Grayson Award (2014)

Academic background
- Education: BA Sociology, Trinity University (1976) MA Sociology, Harvard University (1979) PhD Sociology, Harvard University (1980)
- Thesis: Virtuous Pagans: Unreligious People in America (1980) (1980)

Academic work
- Discipline: Information systems; Management; Business administration
- Sub-discipline: Business analytics; Knowledge management; AI in business
- Institutions: Current positions: Babson College (1999–); UVA Darden (2024–); Oxford Saïd (2020–); MIT IDE (2010–); Deloitte (2010–)
- Main interests: Business analytics; Knowledge management; Artificial intelligence; Process innovation
- Notable works: Competing on Analytics (2007) Working Knowledge (1998) Process Innovation (1993) Only Humans Need Apply (2016) The AI Advantage (2018) All In on AI (2023)
- Notable ideas: Analytics 1.0, 2.0, 3.0
- Website: www.tomdavenport.com

Thomas Hayes "Tom" Davenport, Jr. (born October 17, 1954) is an American academic and author specializing in business analytics, business process innovation, knowledge management, and artificial intelligence. As of 2025, he holds the President's Distinguished Professor position in Information Technology and Management at Babson College. He is a Visiting Professor of the Practice of Leadership at Brown University's School of Professional Studies, is a Research Fellow at the MIT Initiative on the Digital Economy, and advises Deloitte's Chief Data and AI Officer Program.

== Education ==
Davenport completed his undergraduate education at Trinity University, earning a Bachelor of Arts in Sociology in 1976, graduating magna cum laude and as a member of Phi Beta Kappa. He pursued graduate studies at Harvard University, where he received a Master of Arts in Sociology in 1979 and completed his Ph.D. in Sociology in 1980. He also completed the Business Program for Ph.D.s at Harvard in 1982. His doctoral dissertation, "Virtuous Pagans: Unreligious People in America," was later selected for publication in Garland Publishing's "Outstanding Harvard Dissertations" series in 1992.

== Career ==
=== Early career and business process reengineering ===
Following his doctoral studies, Davenport began his career in academia before transitioning to management consulting. In the mid-1980s, he joined Index Group (later CSC Index) as Director of Research, where his work contributed to the development of business process reengineering. Through a multiclient research program called PRISM (Partnership for Research in Information Systems Management), Davenport and his colleagues interviewed 100 companies about how information technology could improve cross-functional processes, research that became foundational to the reengineering movement.

His 1990 article with James Short in MIT Sloan Management Review, "The New Industrial Engineering: Information Technology and Business Process Redesign" and his 1993 book Process Innovation: Reengineering Work through Information Technology were the first article and book on the topic and established him as a thought leader in the field. He later critiqued some of the excesses of the reengineering movement in his 1995 Fast Company article "The Fad that Forgot People."

=== Knowledge management contributions ===
In the late 1990s, Davenport shifted focus to knowledge management, co-authoring Working Knowledge: How Organizations Manage What They Know with Larry Prusak in 1998. The book received the Library Journal's Best Business Book award for 1997 and established fundamental principles for the emerging field. Professional reviews praised its practical approach, with PC Week noting it "provides a strong, fundamental grounding in many of the concepts that are critical to understanding knowledge management."

=== Analytics and competitive advantage ===
Davenport's most influential contribution came with his 2006 Harvard Business Review article "Competing on Analytics," which the journal's editors later named one of the twelve "must read" articles in HBR's 100-year history. The article introduced the concept of analytics as a source of competitive advantage and led to a book of the same name co-authored with Jeanne Harris in 2007. The book sold over 100,000 copies and was translated into 13 languages, with CIO Insight including it among "the most provocative, engaging business books of all-time."

Davenport developed a framework describing the evolution of analytics through three stages: Analytics 1.0 (traditional business intelligence), Analytics 2.0 (big data era), and Analytics 3.0 (data-enriched offerings). This framework has been widely adopted in business and academic contexts.

=== Artificial intelligence and automation ===
As artificial intelligence gained prominence in business applications, Davenport became interested in practical AI implementation. His 2018 book The AI Advantage, published in cooperation with MIT Sloan Management Review, was praised by business publications as an essential guide for organizations implementing AI. In 2016, he co-authored Only Humans Need Apply with Julia Kirby, addressing concerns about automation's impact on employment. He has since co-authored six other books on AI topics, including Working with AI: Real Stories of Human-Machine Collaboration (MIT Press, 2022); Advanced Introduction to Artificial Intelligence in Healthcare (Elgar, 2022); All In on AI: How Smart Companies Win Big with Artificial Intelligence (co-authored with Nitin Mittal, Harvard Business Review Press, 2023); All Hands on Tech: The AI-Powered Citizen Revolution (Wiley, 2024); Agentic Artificial Intelligence: Harnessing AI Agents to Reinvent Business, Work, and Life (Irreplaceable Publishing, 2025); and The New Science of Customer Relationships: Fulfilling the One-to-One Promise with AI (Wiley, 2025).

Davenport's work has significantly influenced business practices across industries. Major corporations including Capital One, Netflix, Amazon, and Progressive Insurance have implemented analytics strategies based on his frameworks. According to Google Scholar, his work has been cited by over 167,000 scholars as of 2025.

In 2019, when the American Productivity and Quality Center (APQC) named him their inaugural Distinguished Research Fellow, Chairman Carla O'Dell stated: "Tom Davenport has been at the forefront of every major management innovation for 30 years and is one of the world's top business gurus... His is a voice of reason amid the inevitable hyperbole that accompanies every 'next big thing' in management."

== Awards and honors ==
In 2022 and 2023, Research.com recognized him with their Business and Management in United States Leader Award. The Analytics Hall of Fame inducted him as a Global Leader in 2019. He was recognized as LinkedIn's #1 Voice in Education in 2016 and as a Top Voice in Technology in 2018.

Davenport won the NASSCOM Global Leadership Award for Thought Leadership (2014), the C. Jackson Grayson Quality Pioneer Award from the American Productivity and Quality Center (2014), and inclusion in Fortune magazine's Top 50 Business Professors in the World list (2012). In 2007, Ziff-Davis publications named him one of the 100 most influential people in the IT industry, where he ranked as the highest business academic. Consulting Magazine recognized him as one of the world's "Top 25 Consultants" in 2003, and CIO Magazine named him one of 10 "Masters of the New Economy" in 2000.

== Selected publications ==
=== Books ===
- The New Science of Customer Relationships with Jim Sterne (Wiley, 2025) ISBN 9781394320035
- All In on AI: How Smart Companies Win Big with Artificial Intelligence with Nitin Mittal (Harvard Business Review Press, 2023) ISBN 9781647824709
- Working with AI: Real Stories of Human-Machine Collaboration with Steven Miller (MIT Press, 2022) ISBN 9780262047241
- The AI Advantage: How to Put the Revolution in Artificial Intelligence to Work (MIT Press, 2018) ISBN 9780262538008
- Competing on Analytics: The New Science of Winning with Jeanne G. Harris (Harvard Business Review Press, 2007; revised 2017) ISBN 9781633693722
- Only Humans Need Apply: Winners and Losers in the Age of Smart Machines with Julia Kirby (Harper Business, 2016) ISBN 9780062438607
- Big Data at Work: Dispelling the Myths, Discovering the Opportunities (Harvard Business Review Press, 2014) ISBN 9781422168172
- Keeping Up with the Quants: Your Guide to Understanding and Using Analytics with Jinho Kim (Harvard Business Review Press, 2013) ISBN 978-1-4221-8725-8
- Analytics at Work: Smarter Decisions, Better Results with Jeanne Harris and Robert Morison (Harvard Business Review Press, 2010) ISBN 9781422177693
- Thinking for a Living: How to Get Better Performance and Results from Knowledge Workers (Harvard Business School Press, 2005) ISBN 9781591394235
- The Attention Economy: Understanding the New Currency of Business with John C. Beck (Harvard Business School Press, 2001) ISBN 9781578518715
- Working Knowledge: How Organizations Manage What They Know with Laurence Prusak (Harvard Business School Press, 1998) ISBN 9780875846552
- Information Ecology: Mastering the Information and Knowledge Environment with Laurence Prusak (Oxford University Press, 1997) ISBN 9780195111682
- Process Innovation: Reengineering Work through Information Technology (Harvard Business School Press, 1993) ISBN 9780875843667

=== Selected articles ===
- "How to Marry Process Management and AI" with Tom Redman, Harvard Business Review (Jan-Feb 2025)
- "Artificial Intelligence for the Real World" with Rajeev Ronanki, Harvard Business Review (Jan-Feb 2018)
- "Analytics 3.0" Harvard Business Review (December 2013)
- "Data Scientist: The Sexiest Job of the 21st Century" with D.J. Patil, Harvard Business Review (October 2012)
- "Competing on Analytics" Harvard Business Review (January 2006)
- "The New Industrial Engineering: Information Technology and Business Process Redesign" with J. E. Short, Sloan Management Review (Summer 1990) - Winner of Edgar Schein Award for best article on planned change

== Personal life ==
Davenport has two sons. Hayes Davenport is a television comedy writer and podcaster based in Los Angeles. Chase Davenport works as a researcher and consultant on coastal science issues in San Francisco and has co-authored articles on artificial intelligence applications.

== See also ==
- Business analytics
- Knowledge management
- Business process reengineering
- Attention economy
- Business intelligence
