= List of cities and counties in the United States offering an LGBTQ non-discrimination ordinance =

Map of states, counties, and municipalities that have sexual orientation and gender identity discrimination prohibited in public and private employment via statute, executive order, regulation, and/or court ruling: Sexual orientation and gender identity discrimination prohibited in public and private employment Sexual orientation discrimination prohibited in public and private employment, while gender identity discrimination prohibited in public employment Gender identity discrimination prohibited in public and private employment, while sexual orientation discrimination prohibited in public employment Sexual orientation discrimination prohibited in public and private employment Gender identity discrimination prohibited in public and private employment Sexual orientation and gender identity discrimination prohibited in public employment Sexual orientation discrimination prohibited in public employment Sexual orientation and gender identity discrimination not prohibited in public and private employment

Employment discrimination on the basis of sexual orientation or gender identity is prohibited in the United States as per the United States Supreme Court ruling in Bostock v. Clayton County on June 15, 2020. A number of cities and counties in the United States have implemented non-discrimination laws for sexual orientation and/or gender identity. As of October 25, 2017, at least 400 cities and counties prohibit discrimination on the basis of sexual orientation and gender identity for both public and private employees. Most but not all of these cities and counties are located in states that have a statewide non-discrimination law for sexual orientation and/or gender identity.

Localities in bold are jurisdictions that prohibit discrimination in the public and private sector. Localities in italics are jurisdictions that prohibit discrimination in public employment only.

Additionally, the US Supreme Courth held in Bostock v. Clayton County and R.G. & G.R. Harris Funeral Homes Inc. v. Equal Employment Opportunity Commission that sexual orientation and gender identity are included under "sex" of Title VII of the Civil Rights Act of 1964. This affirms rulings in the Second, the Sixth, the Seventh, and the Eleventh circuit courts. Sexual orientation has been established as a protected class in Indiana and, similarly, gender identity in Alabama, Florida, Georgia, Kentucky, Michigan, Ohio and Tennessee, requiring heightened scrutiny in discrimination disputes. None of these states has enacted specific legislation addressing discrimination on account of sexual orientation and gender identity.

== Circuit Court of Appeals rulings ==
=== Sexual orientation ===
==== Hively v. Ivy Tech Community College ====
In 2013, Kim Hively filed a lawsuit against the Ivy Tech Community College of Indiana in South Bend, arguing that she was denied promotions and let go from her job because of her sexual orientation. The United States Court of Appeals for the Seventh Circuit heard oral arguments in the case in November 2016 with discussion focusing on the meaning of the word "sex" in Title VII of the Civil Rights Act, which bans workplace discrimination based on race, religion, national origin or sex. On April 4, 2017, the Court of Appeals ruled in an 8–3 vote that the Civil Rights Act of 1964 prohibits employment discrimination on the basis of sexual orientation. Ivy Tech subsequently stated they would not appeal the ruling to the Supreme Court. This ruling creates a precedent for lower courts in Illinois, Indiana and Wisconsin to follow, meaning employment discrimination based on sexual orientation is now banned in these states (Illinois and Wisconsin already had laws prohibiting such discrimination). Human Rights Campaign hailed the ruling, saying: "Today's ruling is a monumental victory for fairness in the workplace, and for the dignity of lesbian, gay and bisexual Americans who may live in fear of losing their job based on whom they love."

==== Zarda v. Altitude Express, Inc. ====
On February 26, 2018, the United States Court of Appeals for the Second Circuit (covering Connecticut, New York and Vermont) ruled that Title VII of the Civil Rights Act of 1964 prohibits sexual orientation employment discrimination under the category of sex. Donald Zarda, who worked for Altitude Express as a skydiving instructor in New York, is gay. To avoid any discomfort his female students might feel being strapped to an unfamiliar man, Zarda would often disclose he was gay. Before one particular jump with a female student, Zarda told her that he was gay. After the skydive, the student told her boyfriend that Zarda had inappropriately touched her and disclosed his sexual orientation to excuse his behavior. The woman's boyfriend told Zarda's boss, who fired Zarda shortly thereafter. Zarda denied touching the student inappropriately and believed that he was fired solely because of his reference to his sexual orientation. The Court ruled, 10–3, that: "Logically, because sexual orientation is a function of sex and sex is a protected characteristic under Title VII, it follows that sexual orientation is also protected." Donald Zarda died in 2014 in a base jumping accident and the case was continued by his family. The ruling did not focus on whether the merits of his case specifically, but whether sexual orientation was protected as a function of sex, and in effect protected gay workers under the Civil Rights Act. Prior to the ruling, in July 2017, the Justice Department under President Trump had unexpectedly interceded in the case, arguing in filed a friend of the court brief that Title VII of the 1964 Civil Rights Act did not explicitly cover sexual orientation discrimination in the workplace. This stance put the DOJ at odds with the Equal Employment Opportunity Commission.

=== Gender identity ===
==== Glenn v. Brumby ====
In December 2011, the United States Court of Appeals for the Eleventh Circuit (covering Alabama, Florida and Georgia) ruled that Vandy Beth Glenn, a transgender woman living in Georgia, had been unfairly terminated from her job at the Georgia Legislative Assembly due to her transgender status. Relying on Price Waterhouse v. Hopkins and other Title VII precedent, the Court concluded that the plaintiff was discriminated against based on her sex because she was transitioning from male to female. The Court stated that a person is considered transgender "precisely because of the perception that his or her behavior transgresses gender stereotypes." As a result, there is "congruence" between discriminating against transgender individuals and discrimination on the basis of "gender-based behavioral norms." "Because everyone is protected against discrimination based on sex stereotypes, such protections cannot be denied to transgender individuals", the Court ruled.

==== EEOC v. R.G. & G.R. Harris Funeral Homes ====
On March 7, 2018, the United States Court of Appeals for the Sixth Circuit (covering Kentucky, Michigan, Ohio and Tennessee) ruled that Title VII of the Civil Rights Act of 1964 prohibits employment discrimination against transgender people. It also ruled that employers may not use the Religious Freedom Restoration Act to justify discrimination against LGBT people. Aimee Stephens, a transgender woman, began working for a funeral home and presented as male. In 2013, she told her boss that she had a gender identity disorder and planned to transition. She was promptly fired by her boss who said that "gender transition violat[es] God's commands because a person's sex is an immutable God-given fit."

=== Case law ===
Case law has been established in the following cases.

==== Schwenk v. Hartford ====
On February 29, 2000, citing Title VII case law, the United States Court of Appeals for the Ninth Circuit, which covers Alaska, Arizona, California, Idaho, Guam, Hawaii, Montana, Nevada, the Northern Mariana Islands, Oregon and Washington, ruled that a transgender woman serving a prison sentence appropriately stated a claim of sex discrimination under the Gender Motivated Violence Act when filing a complaint about an assault from a prison guard.

==== Rosa v. Parks W. Bank & Trust Co ====
On June 9, 2000, the United States Court of Appeals for the First Circuit (covering Maine, Massachusetts, New Hampshire, Puerto Rico and Rhode Island) ruled that Lucas Rosa, a transgender woman, could claim sex discrimination under the Equal Credit Opportunity Act when a bank denied her a loan application because of the way she was dressed. The ruling cited Title VII case law.

==== Tovar v. Essentia Health ====
On May 24, 2017, the United States Court of Appeals for the Eighth Circuit (covering Arkansas, Iowa, Minnesota, Missouri, Nebraska, North Dakota, and South Dakota) ruled in Tovar v. Essentia Health, the case of a nurse practitioner in Minnesota claiming discrimination based on gender identity because her insurance company would not cover her transgender child under her health insurance. The court ruled that Tovar lacked standing to pursue the claims of discrimination because she could not file suit on behalf of her child. However, in its ruling the 8th Circuit wrote that "because the district court concluded that Tovar is not within the class of plaintiffs for whom Title VII and the MHRA create causes of action, we assume for purposes of this appeal that the prohibition of sex-based discrimination under Title VII and the MHRA encompasses protection for transgender individuals".

==== Wittmer v. Phillips 66 Company ====
In April 2018, the U.S. District Court for the Southern District of Texas ruled that although a woman hadn't proven she had been discriminated against for being transgender by the company Phillips 66, if that had been proven, then the woman would have "had a case" under Title VII of the Civil Rights Act of 1964. The judge, who had been appointed by President George H. W. Bush in 1992, cited other recent cases as shaping the final decision.

== States ==
=== Alabama ===
There is no legal prohibition of discrimination on the basis of sexual orientation and gender identity for both public and private employees on a statewide level.

- Sexual orientation and gender identity
  - Cities: **Birmingham**, Huntsville, **Montevallo**, and Tuscaloosa.
- Sexual orientation only
  - City: Montgomery.

=== Alaska ===
Statewide prohibition of discrimination on the basis of sexual orientation for state employees by executive order.

- Sexual orientation and gender identity
  - Consolidated city-boroughs: **Anchorage**, **Juneau**, and **Sitka**.

=== Arizona ===
Statewide prohibition of discrimination on the basis of both sexual orientation and gender identity for state employees and contractors by an executive order.

- Sexual orientation and gender identity
  - Cities: Chandler, **Flagstaff**, Gilbert, Glendale, Mesa, **Phoenix**, Scottsdale, **Sedona**, **Tempe,** **Tucson**, and **Winslow**.

=== Arkansas ===
There is no legal prohibition of discrimination on the basis of sexual orientation and gender identity for both public and private employees on a statewide level. The Arkansas Intrastate Commerce Improvement Act blocks any local unit of government from barring discrimination on any basis not already covered by state law to private businesses.

- Sexual orientation and gender identity
  - County: Pulaski.
  - Cities: Conway, Eureka Springs, Fayetteville, Hot Springs, Little Rock, and North Little Rock.
- Sexual orientation only
  - City: Marvell, and Springdale.

=== California ===
Statewide prohibition of discrimination on the basis of sexual orientation and gender identity for both public and private employees by state statute.

=== Colorado ===
Statewide prohibition of discrimination on the basis of sexual orientation and gender identity for both public and private employees by state statute.

=== Connecticut ===
Statewide prohibition of discrimination on the basis of sexual orientation and gender identity for both public and private employees by state statute.

=== Delaware ===
Statewide prohibition of discrimination on the basis of sexual orientation and gender identity for both public and private employees by state statute.

=== Florida ===
There is no legal prohibition of discrimination on the basis of sexual orientation and gender identity for both public and private employees on a statewide level. Florida cities banning discrimination on account of sexual orientation and gender identity in private employment which are located in counties with similar protections are not listed below. Such cities include Miami, Fort Lauderdale, Tampa, Tallahassee, etc.

- Sexual orientation and gender identity
  - Counties: **Alachua**, **Broward**, **Hillsborough**, **Leon**, **Miami-Dade**, **Monroe**, **Orange**, **Osceola**, **Palm Beach**, **Pinellas**, Sarasota, and **Volusia**.
  - Consolidated city-county: **Jacksonville–Duval County**.
  - Cities: **Atlantic Beach**, Cape Coral, **Leesburg**, **Mascotte**, **Mount Dora**, Neptune Beach, **North Port**, Port St. Lucie, **Sarasota**, **St. Augustine Beach**, and **Venice**.
- Sexual orientation only
  - Town: Montverde.

=== Georgia ===
There is no legal prohibition of discrimination on the basis of sexual orientation and gender identity for both public and private employees on a statewide level.

- Sexual orientation and gender identity
  - Counties: Gwinnett.
  - Consolidated city-counties: Augusta-Richmond County, **Athens-Clarke County**, and Macon-Bibb County.
    - Cities: **Atlanta**, Avondale Estates, **Brookhaven**, **Chamblee**, **Clarkston**, **Decatur**, **Doraville**, **Dunwoody**, Pine Lake, **Savannah**, **Smyrna** and **Statesboro**.
- Sexual orientation only
  - Counties: **DeKalb**, **Fulton**.
  - Cities: **East Point**, and Tybee Island.

=== Hawaii ===
Statewide prohibition of discrimination on the basis of sexual orientation and gender identity for both public and private employees by state statute.

=== Idaho ===
There is no legal prohibition of discrimination on the basis of sexual orientation and gender identity for both public and private employees on a statewide level.

- Sexual orientation and gender identity
  - County: Latah.
  - Cities: **Bellevue**, **Boise**, **Coeur d'Alene**, **Driggs**, **Hailey**, **Idaho Falls**, **Ketchum**, **Lewiston**, **Meridian**, **Moscow**, **Pocatello**, **Sandpoint**, and **Victor**.
- Sexual orientation only
  - City: Twin Falls.

=== Illinois ===
Statewide prohibition of discrimination on the basis of sexual orientation and gender identity for both public and private employees by state statute.

=== Indiana ===
Statewide prohibition of discrimination on the basis of sexual orientation and gender identity for state employees by executive order. Indiana cities banning discrimination on account of sexual orientation and gender identity in private employment which are located in counties with similar protections are not listed below. Such cities include Bloomington, Lafayette and Evansville.

- Sexual orientation and gender identity
  - Counties: **Monroe**, **Tippecanoe**, and **Vanderburgh**.
  - Consolidated city-county: **Indianapolis-Marion County**.
  - Cities: **Anderson**, **Carmel**, **Columbus**, **Crawfordsville**, **Hammond**, **Kokomo**, **Michigan City**, **Muncie**, **New Albany**, **South Bend**, **Terre Haute**, **Valparaiso**, and **West Lafayette**.
  - Towns: **Munster**, and **Zionsville**.
- Sexual orientation only
  - County: **Lake**.
  - City: **Fort Wayne**.
  - Town: **Whitestown**.

=== Iowa ===
Statewide prohibition of discrimination on the basis of sexual orientation and gender identity for both public and private employees by state statute.

=== Kansas ===
Statewide prohibition of discrimination on the basis of sexual orientation and gender identity for state employees by executive order. (Note: Statewide executive order against employment discrimination on the basis of both sexual orientation and gender identity was allowed to expire in February 2015 under Governor Sam Brownback; reinstated in January 2019 by Governor Laura Kelly.)

- Sexual orientation and gender identity
  - Consolidated city-county: **Kansas City–Wyandotte County**.
  - Cities: **Fairway**, Hutchinson, **Lawrence**, **Leawood**, **Lenexa**, **Manhattan**, **Merriam**, **Mission**, **Mission Hills**, **Mission Woods**, Olathe, **Overland Park**, **Prairie Village**, **Roeland Park**, **Shawnee**, Topeka, **Westwood**, and **Westwood Hills**.
- Sexual orientation only
  - City: Wichita.
  - County: Shawnee.

=== Kentucky ===
Statewide prohibition of discrimination on the basis of sexual orientation and gender identity for state employees by executive order.

  - Consolidated city-counties: **Lexington-Fayette County**, and **Louisville-Jefferson County**.
  - Counties: **Woodford**
  - Cities: **Bellevue**, **Covington**, **Danville**, **Dayton**, **Fort Thomas**, **Frankfort**, **Georgetown**, **Highland Heights**, **Henderson**, **Maysville**, **Morehead**, **Paducah**, and **Vicco**.

=== Louisiana ===
There is no legal prohibition of discrimination on the basis of sexual orientation and gender identity for both public and private employees on a statewide level.

- Sexual orientation and gender identity
  - Parish: Jefferson.
  - City and parish: **New Orleans**.
  - Cities: Alexandria, Baton Rouge, Lafayette, and **Shreveport**.
  - Unincorporated community: Metairie.
- Sexual orientation only
  - City: Lake Charles.

=== Maine ===
Statewide prohibition of discrimination on the basis of sexual orientation and gender identity for both public and private employees by state statute.

=== Maryland ===
Statewide prohibition of discrimination on the basis of sexual orientation and gender identity for both public and private employees by state statute.

=== Massachusetts ===
Statewide prohibition of discrimination on the basis of sexual orientation and gender identity for both public and private employees by state statute.

=== Michigan ===
Statewide prohibition of discrimination on the basis of sexual orientation and gender identity for both public and private employees by state statute.

=== Minnesota ===
Statewide prohibition of discrimination on the basis of sexual orientation and gender identity for both public and private employees by state statute.

=== Mississippi ===
There is no legal prohibition of discrimination on the basis of sexual orientation and gender identity for both public and private employees on a statewide level.

- Sexual orientation and gender identity
  - Cities: **Clarksdale**, Hattiesburg, **Holly Springs**, **Jackson**, **Magnolia**, Oxford, and Starkville.

=== Missouri ===
Statewide prohibition of discrimination on the basis of sexual orientation for state employees by executive order.

- Sexual orientation and gender identity
  - Counties: **Jackson**, and **St. Louis**.
  - Independent city: **St. Louis**.
  - Cities: Clayton, **Columbia**, **Creve Coeur**, **Ferguson**, **Kansas City**, **Kirksville**, **Kirkwood**, **Maplewood**, **Olivette**, **Richmond Heights**, and **St. Joseph**, **University City**.
- Sexual orientation only
  - City: **St. Charles**.

=== Montana ===
Statewide prohibition of discrimination on the basis of sexual orientation and gender identity for state employees by executive order.

- Sexual orientation and gender identity
  - County: Missoula.
  - City and county: **Butte**.
  - Cities: **Bozeman**, **Helena**, **Missoula**, and **Whitefish**.

=== Nebraska ===
There is no legal prohibition of discrimination on the basis of sexual orientation and gender identity for both public and private employees on a statewide level.

- Sexual orientation and gender identity
  - City: Bellevue, and **Omaha**.
- Sexual orientation only
  - Cities: Grand Island, and Lincoln.

=== Nevada ===
Statewide prohibition of discrimination on the basis of sexual orientation and gender identity for both public and private employees by state statute.

=== New Hampshire ===
Statewide prohibition of discrimination on the basis of sexual orientation and gender identity for both public and private employees by state statute.

=== New Jersey ===
Statewide prohibition of discrimination on the basis of sexual orientation and gender identity for both public and private employees by state statute.

=== New Mexico ===
Statewide prohibition of discrimination on the basis of sexual orientation and gender identity for both public and private employees by state statute.

=== New York ===
Statewide prohibition of discrimination on the basis of sexual orientation and gender identity for both public and private employees by state statute.

=== North Carolina ===
Statewide prohibition of discrimination on the basis of sexual orientation and gender identity for public employees only by executive order. (Note: The North Carolina Public Facilities Privacy & Security Act blocks any local unit of government from barring discrimination on any basis not already covered by state law to private businesses.)

=== North Dakota ===
There is no legal prohibition of discrimination on the basis of sexual orientation and gender identity for both public and private employees on a statewide level.

- Sexual orientation and gender identity
  - City: Grand Forks.
- Sexual orientation only
  - Cities: Fargo, and Jamestown.

=== Ohio ===
Statewide prohibition of discrimination on the basis of both sexual orientation and gender identity or expression (Note: Statewide executive order against employment discrimination on the basis of just gender identity was allowed to expire in January 2011 under Governor John Kasich, reinstated in December 2018 by Kasich.) for state employees by executive order. Ohio cities banning discrimination on account of sexual orientation and gender identity in private employment which are located in counties with similar protections are not listed below. Such cities include Cleveland, Lakewood, and East Lansing, among others.

- Sexual orientation and gender identity
  - Counties: **Cuyahoga**, Franklin, Hamilton, Lucas, Montgomery, Summit, and Wood.
  - Cities: **Akron**, **Athens**, **Bexley**, **Bowling Green**, **Canton**, **Cincinnati**, **Columbus**, **Coshocton**, **Dayton**, Dublin, Gahanna, Hamilton, **Kent**, Lima, **Medina**, **Newark**, **Oberlin**, **Olmsted Falls**, **Oxford**, **Sandusky**, **South Euclid**, **Springfield**, **Toledo**, **Westerville,** **Worthington,** and **Youngstown**.
  - Villages: Laura, and **Yellow Springs**.

=== Oklahoma ===
There is no legal prohibition of discrimination on the basis of sexual orientation and gender identity for both public and private employees on a statewide level.

- Sexual orientation and gender identity
  - City: **Norman**.
- Sexual orientation only
  - Cities: Edmond, Oklahoma City, and Tulsa.

=== Oregon ===
Statewide prohibition of discrimination on the basis of sexual orientation and gender identity for both public and private employees by state statute.

=== Pennsylvania ===
Statewide prohibition of discrimination on the basis of sexual orientation and gender identity for state employees by executive order. While the state has not explicitly enacted anti-discrimination legislation, discrimination in employment based on both sexual orientation and gender identity is interpreted by the Pennsylvania Human Relations Commission as being banned under the category of sex of the Pennsylvania Human Relations Act. Pennsylvania cities banning discrimination on account of sexual orientation and gender identity in private employment which are located in counties with similar protections are not listed below. Such cities include Pittsburgh, Mt. Lebanon, and Ross Township, among others.

- Sexual orientation and gender identity
  - Counties: **Allegheny**, and **Erie**.
  - Consolidated city-county: **Philadelphia**.
  - Cities: **Allentown**, **Bethlehem**, **Easton**, **Harrisburg**, **Lancaster**, **Pittston**, **Reading**, **Scranton**, **Wilkes-Barre**, and **York**.
  - Townships: **Abington**, **Cheltenham**, **East Norriton**, **Haverford**, **Lower Merion**, **Newtown**, **Springfield**, **Susquehanna**, **Upper Dublin**, **Upper Merion**, **Upper Moreland**, **West Norrition**, and **Whitemarsh**.
  - Boroughs: **Ambler**, **Bridgeport**, **Bristol**, **Camp Hill**, **Carlisle**, **Conshohocken**, **Dickson City**, **Downingtown**, **Doylestown**, **Hatboro**, **Huntingdon**, **Jenkintown**, **Kennett Square**, **Lansdale**, **Lansdowne**, **Narberth**, **New Hope**, **Newtown**, **Norristown**, **North Wales**, **Phoenixville**, **Plymouth**, **Royersford**, **State College**, **Stroudsburg**, **Swarthmore**, **West Chester**, **West Conshohocken**, and **Yardley**.
- Sexual orientation only
  - Borough: **Oxford**.

=== Rhode Island ===
Statewide prohibition of discrimination on the basis of sexual orientation and gender identity for both public and private employees by state statute.

=== South Carolina ===
There is no legal prohibition of discrimination on the basis of sexual orientation and gender identity for both public and private employees on a statewide level.

- Sexual orientation and gender identity
  - County: **Richland**.
  - Cities: Charleston, Columbia, and **Myrtle Beach**.
  - Towns: Latta, and **Mount Pleasant**.
- Sexual orientation only
  - Cities: **Folly Beach**, and North Charleston.

=== South Dakota ===
There is no legal prohibition of discrimination on the basis of sexual orientation and gender identity for both public and private employees on a statewide level.

- Sexual orientation and gender identity
  - County: Oglala Lakota.
  - Cities: **Brookings**, Sioux Falls, and Vermillion.
- Sexual orientation only
  - County: Minnehaha.
  - Cities: Spearfish, and Watertown.

=== Tennessee ===
There is no legal prohibition of discrimination on the basis of sexual orientation and gender identity for both public and private employees on a statewide level. (Note: The Tennessee Equal Access to Intrastate Commerce Act blocks any local unit of government from barring discrimination on any basis not already covered by state law to private businesses.) The Tennessee Equal Access to Intrastate Commerce Act blocks any local unit of government from barring discrimination on any basis not already covered by state law to private businesses.

- Sexual orientation and gender identity
  - County: Davidson.
  - Cities: Chattanooga, Knoxville, Memphis, and Nashville.
- Sexual orientation only
  - City: Franklin.

=== Texas ===
There is no legal prohibition of discrimination on the basis of sexual orientation and gender identity for both public and private employees on a statewide level. Texas cities banning discrimination on account of sexual orientation gender identity in private employment which are located in counties with similar protections are not listed below. This include the city of Dallas.

- Sexual orientation and gender identity
  - Counties: Bexar, **Dallas**, and Walker.
  - Cities: **Austin**, Arlington, Brownsville, Corpus Christi, Denton, El Paso, **Fort Worth**, Lubbock, Mesquite, **Plano**, San Antonio, and Waco.

Note that Arlington, Brownsville, Corpus Christi, Denton, Lubbock, Mesquite, and Waco have protections for sexual orientation and gender identity offered only for city employment, which may include city contractors.

- Sexual orientation only
  - Cities: Grand Prairie, and McAllen, and Round Rock.

=== Utah ===
Statewide prohibition of discrimination on the basis of sexual orientation and gender identity for both public and private employees by state statute.

=== Vermont ===
Statewide prohibition of discrimination on the basis of sexual orientation and gender identity for both public and private employees by state statute.

=== Virginia ===
Statewide prohibition of discrimination on the basis of sexual orientation and gender identity for both public and private employees by state statute. An additional law within Virginia, also allows cities and counties to make their own ordinances on this topic as well listed below.

- Sexual orientation and gender identity
  - Independent cities: **Charlottesville**, and **Richmond**.
- Sexual orientation only
  - County: **Arlington**.
  - Independent city: **Alexandria**.

=== Washington ===
Statewide prohibition of discrimination on the basis of sexual orientation and gender identity for both public and private employees by state statute.

=== West Virginia ===
- Sexual orientation and gender identity
  - Cities: **Beckley**, **Buckhannon**, **Charles Town**, **Charleston**, **Fairmont**, **Huntington**, **Lewisburg**, **Martinsburg**, **Morgantown**, and **Wheeling**.
  - Towns: **Harpers Ferry**, **Shepherdstown**, **Sutton**, and **Thurmond**.
- Sexual orientation only
  - County: Kanawha.
  - City: Elkins.

=== Wisconsin ===
Statewide prohibition of discrimination on the basis of sexual orientation for both public and private employees by state statute. Statewide prohibition of discrimination on the basis of gender identity for state employees by executive order. Wisconsin cities banning discrimination on account of gender identity in private employment which are located in counties with similar protections are not listed below. Such cities include Milwaukee, Madison and Cudahy.

- Sexual orientation and gender identity
  - Counties: **Dane**, and **Milwaukee**.
  - Cities: **Appleton**, **De Pere**, **Janesville**, Oshkosh, **Racine**, and Stevens Point.

=== Wyoming ===
There is no legal prohibition of discrimination on the basis of sexual orientation and gender identity for both public and private employees on a statewide level.

- Sexual orientation and gender identity
  - Cities: **Jackson**, and **Laramie**.
- Sexual orientation only
  - City: Casper, Cheyenne, and Gillette.

== District of Columbia ==
Prohibition of discrimination on the basis of sexual orientation and gender identity for both public and private employees by statute.

== Territories ==
=== American Samoa ===
There is no legal prohibition of discrimination on the basis of sexual orientation and gender identity for both public and private employees on a statewide level.

=== Guam ===
Prohibition of discrimination on the basis of sexual orientation and gender identity for both public and private employees by statute.

=== Northern Mariana Islands ===
Statewide prohibition of discrimination on the basis of sexual orientation for state employees by state statute.

=== Puerto Rico ===
Prohibition of discrimination on the basis of sexual orientation and gender identity for both public and private employees by statute.

=== United States Virgin Islands ===
Prohibition of discrimination on the basis of sexual orientation and gender identity for both public and private employees by statute.
