= Alfred Freedman =

American psychiatrist

- Born: January 7, 1917; Albany, New York
- Died: April 17, 2011 (aged 94); Manhattan, New York
- Occupation: Psychiatrist

Alfred Mordecai Freedman (January 7, 1917 – April 17, 2011) was an American psychiatrist. A long-time educator and advocate of social justice, Freedman is known for leading the effort to have the American Psychiatric Association de-classify homosexuality as a mental illness.

== Early life and education ==
Alfred Freedman was born January 7, 1917, in Albany, New York. After earning his undergraduate degree at Cornell University in 1937, Freedman graduated from the University of Minnesota Medical School in 1941. He began an internship at Harlem Hospital but left before completion to enlist in the United States Army Air Corps. He left the service having attained the rank of Major.

After initially studying neuropsychology, Freedman trained in both general and child psychiatry, undertaking a residency at Bellevue Hospital. He became the chief of child psychiatry at the SUNY Downstate Medical Center, a post in which he served for five years, before becoming the first person to serve full-time as the department of psychiatry chairman at New York Medical College, a post which he held for 30 years.

== Removing homosexuality as a mental illness ==
In 1972, Freedman was approached by the Committee of Concerned Psychiatrists, a group of young reform-minded doctors, who encouraged him to run for the presidency of the American Psychiatric Association. He won the election by 3 votes out of some 9,000 that were cast.

In his position as president, Freedman immediately supported a resolution offered by Robert L. Spitzer to delete homosexuality from the list of mental illness diagnoses. On December 15, 1973, the APA's board of trustees voted 13–0 in favor of the resolution, which stated that "by itself, homosexuality does not meet the criteria for being a psychiatric disorder" and that "We will no longer insist on a label of sickness for individuals who insist that they are well and demonstrate no generalized impairment in social effectiveness." LGBT rights organizations have hailed this decision as one of the greatest advances for gay equality in the United States. Freedman himself believed that passing this resolution was the most important accomplishment of his one-year tenure as president. A second resolution called for an end to discrimination based on sexual orientation and the repeal of laws against consensual gay sex.

== Other concerns ==
Freedman was also concerned about the treatment of drug addiction. In 1959 he established in East Harlem one of the earliest drug treatment programs for adults and the following year created a similar program for adolescents. As president of the APA Freedman worked to draw attention to the abuse of psychiatry in the Soviet Union. He led a delegation to the USSR and challenged the practice of detaining political dissidents in mental facilities. Following his retirement he turned his attention to the role of psychiatry in capital punishment and campaigned for doctors not to participate in executions and against the administration of psychiatric medicines to death row inmates so they could be declared competent for execution.

The Alfred M. Freedman Award for best scientific paper presented at the annual International Society of Political Psychology meeting was awarded from 1993 to 1999.

== Death ==
Alfred Freedman died in Manhattan on April 17, 2011, following complications after surgery to treat a hip fracture. He is survived by his wife, Marcia, sons Dan and Paul and three grandchildren.
