= LGBTQ rights in Tennessee =

- Tennessee (US)
- Legal status: Legal since 1996
- Gender identity: blocked by the Vital Records Act of 1977
- Discrimination protections: Sexual orientation and gender identity in employment only federally since 2020, enforcement blocked by the Equal Access to Intrastate Commerce Act, and also its enforcement is additionally blocked by a state court ruling.

Family rights
- Recognition of relationships: Same-sex marriage since 2015
- Adoption: Legal since 2007

Lesbian, gay, bisexual, transgender, and queer (LGBTQ) people in the U.S. state of Tennessee face legal challenges that non-LGBTQ residents do not. Same-sex sexual activity has been legal in the state since 1996. Marriage licenses have been issued to same-sex couples in Tennessee since the Supreme Court ruling in Obergefell v. Hodges on June 26, 2015.

Human Rights Campaign's annual state report in 2024 classified Tennessee as one of the lowest-ranking states in the country for LGBTQ rights. Tennessee restricts the passage of anti‑discrimination municipal protections and possesses numerous laws which deny the rights of transgender individuals.

== Sodomy law ==
The Tennessee Court of Appeals ruled unanimously that the state's sodomy statute was unconstitutional in 1996 in the case of Campbell v. Sundquist, and the law was subsequently repealed by the state legislature the same year.

In November 2023, the city of Murfreesboro within Rutherford County, Tennessee formally removed "homosexuality" from its local ordinance that criminalizes it after being ordered to do so by U.S. District Judge Waverly D. Crenshaw on October 20, 2023. The ruling stated that the city "shall not" enforce any code that uses the term "homosexuality" in the definition of "sexual conduct". The Tennessee Equality Project had an ongoing suit in the matter, which has since settled. (See Drag Performances § City of Murfreesboro for more information.)

== Recognition of same-sex relationships ==
=== Marriage ===
Prior to the Obergefell v. Hodges ruling by the U.S. Supreme Court, Tennessee recognized neither same-sex marriages nor any other form of same sex-unions. The state banned same-sex marriage both by statute and by constitutional amendment.

In March 2023, the state house passed HB 878 to allow government employees to refuse to solemnize a marriage that went against their personal beliefs. On February 21, 2024, the Governor signed into law the one page bill.

=== Domestic partnership ===
Map of Tennessee counties and cities that offer domestic partner benefits either county-wide or in particular cities. City offers domestic partner benefits County-wide partner benefits through domestic partnership County or city does not offer domestic partner benefits

The cities of Collegedale and Knoxville together with the Metropolitan Area of Nashville and Davidson County have enacted domestic partnership benefits for same-sex couples. The Chattanooga City Council voted to allow domestic partnerships in 2013, but this was repealed by voters in August 2014. However, same-sex marriages have been available throughout Tennessee since the June 2015 Supreme Court ruling overturning same-sex marriage bans nationwide.

== Adoption and parenting ==
Tennessee allows single persons to adopt children. Same-sex couples may legally adopt in the state. In 2007, the Tennessee Attorney General released an opinion that no state law prohibited adoption by same-sex couples and that such adoptions could be made if in the child's best interest.

In January 2020, the Tennessee General Assembly, returning for its first session of the year, immediately passed a bill to allow adoption and welfare agencies to reject LGBTQ parents if the agency cited its “sincerely held religious beliefs." The exemption would protect the agencies from liability and lawsuits. 13 other US jurisdictions have similar laws. Governor Bill Lee signed the bill into law, and it took effect immediately.

In April 2024, Governor Lee signed the Tennessee Foster and Adoptive Parent Protection Act allowing individuals who do not support LGBTQ rights to adopt or foster LGBTQ children within the Tennessee foster care system, eliminating a 10-year policy that protected the "dignity and respect" of all children in DCS custody. Opponents have stated that the bill is in violation of a federal rule enacted in 2023, pointing out that the language of the bill doesn't allow for the child to express their preference. Under the Act, LGBTQ children could potentially be placed with individuals wanting to subject them to conversion therapy. Before its passage, Aftyn Behn called the bill discriminatory and stated that its very name implied the parents need protection from the children they've agreed to foster.

== Discrimination protections ==
Map of Tennessee counties and cities that have sexual orientation and/or gender identity anti–employment discrimination ordinances circa 2016 Sexual orientation and gender identity solely in public employment Sexual orientation in public employment Does not protect sexual orientation and gender identity in employment

=== State and federal ===
Tennessee law does not prohibit discrimination of the basis of sexual orientation and gender identity. Since 2020, the federal protections stemming from the Supreme Court's rulings in Bostock v. Clayton County and R.G. & G.R. Harris Funeral Homes Inc. v. Equal Employment Opportunity Commission have been available in Tennessee.

This was followed in January 2021 by executive orders from the Biden administration, enabling sanctions against schools and colleges that did not follow the directives of the Equal Employment Opportunity Commission or Department of Education on the protection of gay, lesbian and transgender students. Allowed actions against non-complying schools included legal action, civil penalties and withholding of federal funding. Twenty state-attorneys general joined a suit against enforcement of the executive order and on July 15, 2022, a federal judge of the Eastern District of Tennessee issued a preliminary injunction, temporarily preventing the two agencies from enforcing their directives under the presidential order. The federal discrimination protections still apply in all twenty states, only the specific enforcements outlined in the executive order are temporarily blocked, pending continuing legal proceedings.

=== Local ===
The cities of Knoxville, Memphis, Franklin, Chattanooga and the Metropolitan Area of Nashville and Davidson County have ordinances prohibiting discrimination in public employment on the basis of sexual orientation and gender identity, but these ordinances do not apply to private employers. The Equal Access to Interstate Commerce Act blocks this from being enforced.

=== HB 563 ===
This "local preemption" bill would prevent government agencies from examining a business's anti-discrimination policies when deciding whether to hire that business for a taxpayer-funded contract. A scheduled vote in the Tennessee House was rescheduled from March 14, 2019, to March 21.

=== R.G. & G.R. Harris Funeral Homes v. EEOC ===
On March 7, 2018, the United States Court of Appeals for the Sixth Circuit (covering Kentucky, Michigan, Ohio and Tennessee) ruled that Title VII of the Civil Rights Act of 1964 prohibits employment discrimination against transgender people under the category of sex. It also ruled that employers may not use the Religious Freedom Restoration Act to justify discrimination against LGBTQ people. Aimee Stephens, a transgender woman, began working for a funeral home and presented as male. In 2013, she told her boss that she was transgender and planned to transition. She was promptly fired by her boss who said that "gender transition violat[es] God's commands because a person's sex is an immutable God-given fit." With this decision, discrimination in the workplace based on gender identity is now banned in Tennessee.

An appeal to the case was heard by the Supreme Court, argued on October 7, 2019, term under R.G. & G.R. Harris Funeral Homes Inc. v. Equal Employment Opportunity Commission. It was assigned docket number 17-1618, and decided on June 14, 2020. The finding was that employers firing individuals merely for being LGBTQ+ violate Title VII of the Civil Rights Act of 1964 in so doing. The case was decided 6 to 3.

=== State of TN, et al. v. USDA, et al. ===
On July 26, 2022, Brandon J. Smith, Chief of Staff for then Tennessee Attorney General Herbert H Slatery III, signed a court filing of a lawsuit wherein the states of Tennessee, Indiana, Alabama, Alaska, Arizona, Arkansas, Georgia, Kansas, Kentucky, Louisiana, Mississippi, Missouri, Montana, Nebraska, Ohio, Oklahoma, South Carolina, South Dakota, Utah, Virginia, and West Virginia all sued the US federal government, specifically the US Department of Agriculture; Cindy Long, the Administrator of Food and Nutrition Service at the USDA; and Roberto Contreras, the Director of Food and Nutrition Service Civil Rights Division at the USDA. At issue was Executive Order 13988, signed January 20, 2021. The order prevented discrimination on the basis of sexual orientation or gender identity, a blanket directive to comply with the Bostock SCOTUS decision.

Pursuant to that executive order, the USDA issued a policy update on May 5, 2022. Memo CRD 01-2022 set forth policies to make certain that no discrimination on the basis of sexual orientation or gender identity takes place when states process applications for SNAP benefits.

The above named states sued the USDA claiming that implementing the nondiscrimination policy would put an undue burden on the states, specifically relying on the requirements of the Administrative Procedure Act and the fact that the states were not given opportunity to comment prior to the USDA policy memo being implemented. It also argued that the USDA was trying to circumvent Congress and write law.

U.S. District Judge Travis R. McDonough decided the case on March 29, 2023, ruling that the plaintiff states were exaggerating the issues at hand. The ruling states, "Does a regulation interpreting [7 U.S.C. § 2011, et seq., and 20 U.S.C. § 1681, et seq.] to prohibit such food assistance discrimination upend everything from free speech and religious freedom to living facilities and sports teams? Plaintiff States insist they do, but the Court disagrees." He went on to grant the USDA's motion to dismiss the case, at one point saying, “This case is about food stamps and nutrition education, not bathrooms, sports teams, free speech, or religious exercise,” and continuing, "Plaintiff States’ insistence to the contrary is no more than an invitation to join a political discussion untethered to applicable statutes and precedent.”

As of March 2023, current Tennessee AG Jonathan Skrmetti's office is considering an appeal. On April 18, 2023, a motion was filed for Attorney General Eric Hamilton to appear pro hac vice. The motion was granted.

== Hate crime law ==
Tennessee law has punished hate crime on the basis of sexual orientation since 2001. The law does not explicitly include gender identity, though it is covered by federal law. Tennessee Attorney General Herbert H. Slatery stated in February 2019 that hate crime laws implicitly cover gender identity, because gender or sex is explicitly covered in Tennessee hate crime legislation - a legal first for a southern US state.

The opinion was issued in response to a query by Representative Mike Stewart (D-Nashville), who asked, "If a defendant selects the person against whom he commits a crime because the person is transgender, may a court enhance the defendant’s sentence under § 40-35-114(17)?" The question was raised in response to state Senator Sara Kyle filing a bill in the Tennessee Senate in 2018 to explicitly add gender identity to the hate crime statute. After the opinion, Stewart told reporters, "Let's see how the courts actually utilize the law in practice and let's see how much protection it provides."

AG Slatery's formal opinion stated that a crime committed against someone because they are transgender is covered under the queried statute, as, "a crime committed against a person because that person manifests a gender that is different than his or her biological gender at birth—i.e. a crime committed against a person because he or she is transgender—is thus necessarily committed because of, at least in part, the person’s gender."

The Tennessee Bureau of Investigation's hate crime statistics report from 2019 through 2021 records 0 incidents against transgender persons in 2019, 1 in 2020, and 2 in 2021. The numbers might be underreported, however, as the DOJ records at least 1 crime committed against a Tennessean as a result of their gender identity in 2019. It is also possible that intersecting regulations cause crimes that would qualify as hate crimes to not be investigated as such.

== Gender identity and expression ==
=== Identity documents ===
In 1977, the Tennessee state legislature prohibited the state from altering the sex on a birth certificate. According to the Tenn. Code Ann. § 68-3-203(d): “The sex of an individual shall not be changed on the original certificate of birth as a result of sex change surgery."

In 2023, Governor Lee signed into law a definition of the term "sex" which, under Tennessee law, is "determined by the anatomy and genetics existing at the time of birth." The ACLU filed suit on April 23, 2024, in Davidson County on behalf of a transgender woman who legally transitioned and was denied the right to change her gender as it appears on her driver's license by the Tennessee Department of Safety and Homeland Security.

=== Medical care ===
In March 2020, before the House adjourned during the coronavirus health crisis, it had been considering HB 2576 and HB 2827, targeting medical care for transgender youth. On May 17, 2021, Governor Lee signed into law a ban on puberty blockers for prepubescent children that went into immediate effect.

In February 2023, the ban was expanded to make it illegal to provide gender-affirming healthcare to any trans person under 18, both in-state and via telehealth from out of state. Governor Lee signed the Tennessee Senate Bill 1 (SB1) into law on March 1, 2023, alongside the Tennessee Adult Entertainment Act.

Under SB1, no minors could begin receiving gender-affirming care after July 1, 2023, and minors who had already begun receiving gender-affirming care prior to that date would have that care entirely withdrawn by March 31, 2024. People who receive gender-affirming care as minors and who later regret it will be able to sue their parents, guardians, and physicians. The law also allows the Tennessee Attorney General to sue any healthcare professional providing such care to be sued for $25,000.

On April 26, 2023, the United States Department of Justice joined the ACLU and Lambda Legal in suing the state of Tennessee, asking the court to declare the healthcare ban unconstitutional. A federal court issued a partial temporary injunction on June 28, 2023, saying, "If Tennessee wishes to regulate access to certain medical procedures, it must do so in a manner that does not infringe on the rights conferred by the United States Constitution, which is of course supreme to all other laws of the land." By June 30, Skrmetti had filed a motion with the Sixth Circuit Court of Appeals to obtain a stay on the District Court's judgement. The emergency appeal was granted by Judge Sutton, halting Judge Richardson's ruling from taking effect.

On July 8, 2023, the ruling from the District Court for the Middle District of Tennessee was temporarily reversed. One of the reasons cited for removing the injunction was the Dobbs case; another was that the court said it saw no evidence that the treatment at issue is "deeply rooted in our history and traditions." The dissenting justice, Judge White, said that she believed the law to be unconstitutional and because of that she would have only narrowed the scope of the injunction rather than issued a stay as the Appellate Court chose to do.

Judge Sutton also noted that this was a preliminary ruling, acknowledging, "We may be wrong." He set a goal for resolving the case by September 30, 2023. Some considered that this case was likely to end up before SCOTUS.

In June 2025, the U.S. Supreme Court held in United States v. Skrmetti that the Tennessee state law banning puberty blockers and hormone therapy for transgender teenagers does not violate the constitutional right to equal protection of the Fourteenth Amendment to the United States Constitution.

In June 2023, the Attorney General's office mandated that Vanderbilt University Medical Center turn over the medical records of all patients referred to the transgender clinic for gender-affirming care. AG Skrmetti has stated that the investigation is into allegations of fraud following videos and tweets posted by Matt Walsh. VUMC complied. Two patients sued. Separately, the U.S. Department of Health and Human Services is investigating on the basis of federal civil rights laws.

In May 2024, Governor Lee signed a bill into law that would apply civil penalties to adults who help a minor receive gender-affirming care.

==== United States v. Skrmetti ====
The U.S. Supreme Court agreed on June 24, 2024, to review the legality of Tennessee's Republican-backed ban on gender-affirming medical care for transgender minors, following an appeal by President Biden's administration. The challengers argued the ban violated the U.S. Constitution's 14th Amendment's equal protection and due process clauses. Similar bans in other states claim to protect children from harmful treatments, while medical associations support gender-affirming care as essential. Plaintiffs, including transgender minors and their parents, sued to defend the treatments. The decision follows a 6th Circuit Court ruling that upheld the ban, reversing a federal judge's previous injunction.

On June 18, 2025, The Supreme Court ruled to uphold Tennessee's ban on gender-affirming care for trans minors. The decision was 6-3 with the conservative majority on the bench ruling to uphold and the liberal minority dissenting. The majority opinion was penned by Chief Justice John Roberts. In his writing, Roberts noted that "the Equal Protection Clause does not resolve these disagreements.” Justice Sotomayor wrote in dissent saying the ruling "abandons transgender children and their families to political whims," Tennessee Attorney General Jonathan Skrmetti, who argued the case before the court, said the outcome of the ruling is a “common sense” win over “judicial activism.” Chase Strangio, an ACLU lawyer and transgender rights advocate, responded to the ruling saying it “is a devastating loss for transgender people, our families, and everyone who cares about the Constitution.” American Academy of Pediatrics President, Dr. Susan Kressly, said in a statement the organization is “unwavering” in its support of gender-affirming care and “stands with pediatricians and families making health care decisions together and free from political interference.”

=== Prison ===
In April 2024, the Tennessee State Legislature passed a bill to ban gender affirming care for Tennessee inmates.

Under the 2026 "Riley Gaines Women's Safety and Protection Act", transgender inmates are to be placed in prisons based on their sex assigned at birth.

=== Shelters ===
In April 2026, the Tennessee State Legislature passed "The Riley Gaines Women's Safety and Protection Act" which among its provisions bans trans women from women's shelters.

=== Bathrooms ===
On May 2, 2019, Governor Lee signed into law legislation defining a trans person using the bathroom corresponding with their gender identity as "indecent exposure." The Tennessee Equality Project had complained about the bill's original language, and although that language was altered before it became law, the organization still believed the bill was harmful to trans people.

In May 2021, Governor Lee signed two other bathroom bills. It banned transgender students from using bathrooms within public schools and required small businesses to post warning signs if they allow transgender people in multiperson bathrooms. Small-business owners faced up to 6 months jail for noncompliance.

Davidson County District Attorney General Glenn Funk said his office would not dedicate any resources to enforcing the legislation, stating that his office "will not promote hate." The ACLU filed suit on behalf of two business owners in Tennessee in June 2021.

Although the law took effect on July 1, 2021, US District Judge Aleta A. Trauger issued an injunction on July 9, 2021 and struck it down entirely in May 2022, partly on the grounds that it violated business owners' First Amendment rights.

The 2021 Tennessee law went farther than 2016 North Carolina legislation that, due to economic and social damage, North Carolina repealed in 2019.

=== Public schools ===
==== Sports ====
When the Tennessee state legislature reconvened in May 2020 during the coronavirus health crisis, the House moved HB 1572 and HB 1689 targeting transgender student athletes. The Senate also had the ability to move SB 1736 (its version of HB 1689), as this had been under consideration before the Legislature adjourned in March 2020.

On March 26, 2021, Governor Lee signed a bill to ban transgender youth athletes from school sports. The bill had passed the Tennessee Senate on March 1 (the vote was 27–6) and the Tennessee House of Representatives on March 22 (the voice vote was 71–16 with 5 abstentions). The ACLU is representing a Farragut High School student in the matter; suit was filed on November 4, 2021. Judge Waverly D. Crenshaw ordered a partial grant of summary judgement that enjoins the school against enforcing the Gender in Athletics Law or revised policy I-171 to prevent the student from playing boys' interscholastic golf on March 29, 2024. As of May 1, 2024, the case is ongoing.

On April 22, 2022, Governor Lee signed into law Public Chapter 1005 of the Tennessee Code mandating that parents wanting their children to participate in sports in public schools provide evidence of the gender assigned at birth. Any school not taking measures to comply with the law could have funding withheld.

==== Bathroom lawsuits ====
In August 2021, several lawsuits were filed in both state and federal courts against the public school bathroom law in Tennessee that went into effect on July 1, 2021.

==== LGBTQ+ curricula opt-out law ====
In April 2021, a bill passed the Tennessee General Assembly that legally requires children's parents or guardians to be notified about a "sexual orientation or gender identity curriculum" before it is taught and given the ability to opt their children out of it. Governor Lee signed the bill into law in May 2021.

==== Pronoun use in classrooms ====
In May 2023, Tennessee enacted Public Chapter 448 which prohibits teachers from being sued civilly and shields them from disciplinary action by the school should they use a pronoun to address a student which does not reflect the student's gender identity, but rather the gender present on the student's birth certificate. A fiscal note attached to the bill warned that its enactment could potentially cost Tennessee federal funding for education.

==== Mandatory outing of students ====
In May 2024, a law took effect (immediately upon Governor Bill Lee's signature) to require schools to notify parents if their child asks to be called by a different name or pronoun. A teacher who becomes aware of such a request must report it to an administrator who must report it to the parents. Any parent (or AG Skrmetti) may sue the school district for noncompliance.

Tennessee House Representative Mary Littleton claimed that the law would enable parents to obtain therapy for LGBTQ youth to "help them solve their problems." A representative of the Tennessee Equality Project stated that the communities affected by the legislation were not consulted on it.

==== Segregated facilities ====
Under the 2026 "Riley Gaines Women's Safety and Protection Act", transgender people are required to only use facilities matching their assigned sex at birth.

=== Drag performances ===
==== Shelby County - starting in March 2023 ====
In November 2022, the Tennessee General Assembly prefiled a bill to redefine the legal definition of "adult cabaret performance" to ban any "male or female impersonators" from any public property or anywhere they could be seen by someone who's not an adult, under criminal penalty. Instructor Alejandra Caraballo of Harvard Law School was quoted as saying the bill could easily "be applied to trans people for simply existing as themselves", and that, "They're not just going after drag queens, they are trying to criminalize trans and queer people in public spaces." In February 2023, both houses of the state legislature passed the bill, sending it to the Governor. During a subsequent protest over the bill, two people - one trans woman, and one drag queen - were arrested by Memphis Police after shouting "Drag is not a crime" and "Bill Lee is a Nazi". The bill was signed into law in March 2023.

Memphis DA Steven J. Mulroy called the anti-drag bill "ill advised". He also stated that while enforcing it, he wouldn't focus on it. In March, hours before the bill would be enacted, Judge Thomas Parker of United States District Court for the Western District of Tennessee halted the bill to review it. The judge questioned the bill and its lack of qualifications, stating, "The law prohibits a drag performer wearing a crop top and mini skirt from dancing where minors might see it, but does not prohibit a Tennessee Titans cheerleader wearing an identical outfit from performing the exact same dance in front of children." In June 2023, Judge Parker formally declared the law unconstitutional as vague and overbroad.

Tennessee's Attorney General, Jonathan Skrmetti, filed a Notice of Appeal in June 2023. Oral arguments were heard in the case on February 1, 2024. There is no schedule yet for a decision.

==== Blount County - starting in August 2023 ====
Skrmetti has also offered his legal opinion that Judge Parker's ruling is only valid for Shelby County and that the law remains in effect for the rest of the state. In deference to that opinion, Blount County District Attorney Ryan K. Desmond issued a letter to Blount Pride and organizer Flamy Grant in August 2023. It advised that the Pride celebration scheduled for September was illegal under Tennessee law. The ACLU of Tennessee filed suit on behalf of Blount Pride on August 30, 2023 and US. District Judge J. Ronnie Greer issued an injunction on September 1, 2023. Greer pointed out in his decision that DA Desmond agreed in his court filings that the event posted no threat to children. The case is still pending.

==== City of Murfreesboro ordinance ====
In October 2023, the City of Murfreesboro passed ordinance 23-O-22 which used the wording already existing in the city's laws to arguably criminalize being homosexual in public. The ACLU of Tennessee filed suit on behalf of the Tennessee Equality Project. The suit also alleges that city officials have engaged in a year-long concerted effort of harassment to prevent members of the Tennessee Equality Project from exercising their First Amendment rights. The case is being heard by U.S. District Judge Waverly D. Crenshaw, who issued an order on October 20, 2023, stating that the city "shall not" enforce code that included the term "homosexuality" in a definition of "sexual conduct".

The city council voted to remove the term "homosexuality" from the law itself, but the amendment doing so didn't go into effect until November 17, 2023.

The city did use the ordinance to remove at least four LGBTQ+ books from the Linebaugh Public Library system, as well as to institute a tiered organizational system that won't allow certain material to be checked out by anyone under a certain age without parental permission. The case settled on February 7, 2024, with the City of Murfreesboro agreeing to pay $500,000 and to repeal the ordinance, with both parties agreeing to file for dismissal of the case.

== Living conditions ==
LGBTQ people are often discriminated against, refused service, and beaten. Attackers who fatally wound LGBTQ people could use the gay/trans panic defense to lower or eliminate punishment. Often police and legal officials are sympathetic towards the anti-LGBT aggressors and turn a blind eye to attacks often calling homosexual attractions a sin.

== Economic impact on Tennessee ==
In April 2021, it was reported that widespread economic and social impacts on Tennessee could be felt - due to the amount of anti-LGBT bills and laws within Tennessee (like a similar situation back in 2016 within North Carolina regarding the bathroom laws).

== Summary table ==
| Same-sex sexual activity legal | Yes (Since 1996) |
| Equal age of consent (18) | Yes (Since 1996) |
| Anti-discrimination laws in employment | Yes Federally protected since SCOTUS 2020 ruling in the Bostock v. Clayton County case |
| Anti-discrimination laws in housing | No (Prohibited by the Equal Access to Intrastate Commerce Act since 2011) |
| Anti-discrimination laws in public accommodations | No (Prohibited by the Equal Access to Intrastate Commerce Act since 2011) |
| Anti-discrimination laws in the provision of goods and services | No (Prohibited by the Equal Access to Intrastate Commerce Act since 2011) |
| Anti-discrimination laws in schools and colleges | No (Prohibited by the Equal Access to Intrastate Commerce Act since 2011) also even though it's federal law the enforcement is also blocked by a Tennessee judge |
| LGBT Anti-bullying law in schools | No (Only in Nashville and Memphis) (Prohibited by the Equal Access to Intrastate Commerce Act since 2011) |
| Hate crime laws include sexual orientation | No (Only in Nashville and Memphis) (Prohibited by the Equal Access to Intrastate Commerce Act since 2011) |
| Hate crime laws include gender identity or expression | No One legal opinion claims it's protected, but this is just an opinion, it's not officially put in law. |
| Transgender persons in prisons, jails, juvenile detentions, etc. required to be housed according to their gender identity and coverage of transition healthcare | No |
| Gender confirmation surgery, puberty blockers, hormone replacement therapy and other transition-related healthcare for transgender people required to be covered under health insurance and state Medicaid policies | No |
| Transgender people allowed to use restrooms and other gender-segregated spaces that correspond with their gender identity | No (HB 1151, passed in 2019, Defines a trans person using the bathroom or locker-room of their gender identity as "indecent exposure" and technically makes transgender people using the bathroom of their gender identity a Class B Misdemeanor) |
| Transgender people allowed to participate in the sport of their gender identity | No Blocked by Law SB 0228 |
| Gender-neutral bathrooms | No |
| Same-sex marriages | Yes (federally since 2015; TN Public Chapter 511 allows public officials to refuse to solemnize a marriage as of February 21, 2024) |
| Stepchild adoption by same-sex couples | No Yes, blocked by moral exemptions allowing LGBT to be rejected for religious reasons |
| Joint adoption by same-sex couples | No Yes, blocked by moral exemptions allowing LGBT to be rejected for religious reasons |
| Access to IVF for lesbians | No |
| Surrogacy arrangements legal for gay male couples | No Yes, blocked by moral exemptions allowing LGBT to be rejected for religious reasons |
| Lesbian, Gay, and Bisexual people allowed to serve openly in the military | Yes (Since 2011) |
| Transgender people allowed to serve openly in the military | No (Banned since 2025) |
| Transvestites allowed to serve openly in the military | No (Cross-dressing banned in the military since 2012) |
| Intersex people allowed to serve openly in the military | No (Current DoD policy bans "hermaphrodites" from serving or enlisting in the military) |
| Right to change legal gender | Yes |
| Third gender option | No |
| LGBT education | No |
| Gay panic defense abolished | No |
| Conversion therapy banned | No |
| Intersex minors protected from invasive surgical procedures | No |
| Homosexuality declassified as a mental illness | Yes (Since 1973) |
| Transgender identity declassified as a mental illness | No (Reclassified as "gender dysphoria" under DSM-5 since 2013, and diagnosis of gender dysphoria is usually required in order to access transition care) |
| Intersex sex characteristics declassified as a physical deformity | No |
| MSMs allowed to donate blood | Yes / No (Since 2020, 3 month deferral period - federal policy) |

== See also ==
- Recognition of same-sex unions in Tennessee
- Tennessee Equality Project
- Tennessee Transgender Political Coalition
