= Aristide Laurent =

American publisher and LGBT civil rights advocate

Aristide "A.J." Laurent (September 15, 1941, Magnolia Springs, Alabama – October 26, 2011, Los Angeles, California) was an American publisher and LGBT civil rights advocate. He co-founded The Los Angeles Advocate (now known as The Advocate) in 1967 with Sam Allen, Bill Rau, and Richard Mitch.

== Early life ==
He was born in Magnolia Springs, Alabama to Duval “Buck” Laurent, a farm hand, and Elizabeth “Betty” Weeks, and was of Creole ancestry. Joining the Air Force in 1960, serving for four years as an instructor (at Keesler Air Force Base in Mississippi) and signals intelligence operator in Karamursel, Turkey, and being discharged, he moved to California and came out.

== Career ==
Between 1964 and 1967, he worked for KABC in Los Angeles. He allegedly participated in the 1966 Compton's Cafeteria riot in San Francisco, and participated in the riots following the police raid on Black Cat Tavern in Los Angeles. In the wake of the two incidents, he joined Steve Ginsberg's PRIDE organization and co-founded The Los Angeles Advocate. While helping to publish the early editions of the paper, he wrote a nightlife column (“Mariposas de la Noche”) under the pseudonym “P. Nutz.” In 1974, The Advocate was sold and in 1975 was relocated to the Bay Area; Laurent relocated to the Bay Area for a short time before returning to Los Angeles to establish NewsWest (1975–1977) to fill the void left by The Advocate.

In 1976, Laurent was one of 40 arrested after a police raid on the Mark IV Gay Bathhouse following a mistaken tip that the charity "slave auction" being held at the locale to benefit was an actual, illegal slave auction.

In the 1980s, Laurent bought a printing company and participated in ACT UP demonstrations to advocate for AIDS/HIV patients. He also participated in the 1993 March on Washington. In 1996, he was diagnosed with prostate cancer and was given two years to live, but managed to outlive the expectation. In his latter years, he spent more time as an amateur genealogist who focused on Mobile Alabama Creole ancestry.

== Death and legacy ==
He died on October 26, 2011, in Los Angeles after a long struggle with prostate cancer. Laurent's archives are held in the University Library at California State University, Northridge.
