= Jeanne Harris =

American author and academic

Jeanne Harris is an American author, academic, and business executive. Harris is a faculty member of Columbia University, where she teaches a graduate level course on Business Analytics Management. Jeanne retired as the managing director of Information Technology Research for the Accenture Institute for High Performance. She is the co-author with Thomas H. Davenport of Competing on Analytics: The New Science of Winning, revised edition (Harvard Business Review Press, 2017) and Analytics at Work: Smarter Decisions, Better Results. (Harvard Business School Press, 2010) Harris also serves on the INFORMS Analytics Certification Board.

== Career ==
Harris is the former Global Managing Director of Information Technology Research at the Accenture Institute for High Performance in Chicago. Before Jeanne retired she led the Institute's global research agenda in the areas of information, technology, and analytics.

She has been interviewed by ComputerWeekly and others.

=== Awards ===
In 2009, Harris received Consulting Magazine's Women Leaders in Consulting award for Lifetime Achievement.
