= Tennessee Equality Project =

- Logo

- U.S. state of Tennessee
- Founded: June 15, 2004
- Location: Nashville, Tennessee
- Region served: Tennessee
- Website: tnep.org

The Tennessee Equality Project is an LGBTQ organization in the United States state of Tennessee.

== Overview ==
The Tennessee Equality Project was founded on June 15, 2004, in Nashville, Tennessee.

The organization has lobbied against a 2006 referendum to amend the state constitution to ban same-sex marriage, the dismissal of a lesbian soccer coach by Belmont University in 2010, the Don't Say Gay bill sponsored in 2011 by Sen. Stacey Campfield and Rep. Bill Dunn, and other public issues. It endorsed Nashville mayor Karl Dean for re-election in 2011.

In December 2015, TEP attempted to open an LGBT center in Maryville, the county seat of Blount County in partnership with local stakeholders, but this effort was ultimately unsuccessful.

The Project has received funds from the Human Rights Campaign and has partnered with the California-based Courage Campaign to develop political advertising based on the life story of an LGBT Tennessee resident. The organization is a member of the Equality Federation.

In April 2019, the TEP received a $113,000 donation and a handwritten letter of support from singer-songwriter Taylor Swift.

== See also ==
- LGBT rights in Tennessee
- List of LGBT rights organizations
