= Flamy Grant =

American drag queen and Christian singer

- Grant sings in 2023

Background information
- Born: Matthew Blake Lovegood; May 1982 (age 44); Asheville, North Carolina, U.S.
- Education: King College
- Genre: Christian music
- Occupations: Drag queen, Christian singer, former worship leader

Flamy Grant, legal name Matthew Blake Lovegood (born May 1982), is an American drag queen, Christian singer, and former worship leader. They (Note: Grant utilizes both they/them and she/her pronouns, principally using she/her when in drag and they/them when out of drag.) are best known for their Christian songs, for which they became the first drag performer to top the iTunes Christian charts. They have released three albums: one, Back As Far As We Can Go, prior to drag, and two, Bible Belt Baby and CHURCH, in drag. They have emphasized themes of religious deconstruction in their music. Their fourth album, Gloryhound, is set to release in Fall 2026.

== Biography ==
Grant was born in May 1982 in Asheville, North Carolina as Matthew Blake Lovegood. They grew up in a family that was part of the Plymouth Brethren, and they wrote a Christian song for the first time at the age of 9. They began to realize their queer identity at a young age, between grades 3 and 4, and have stated that at that time they "worked extra hard to make it right." They were elected student body chaplain at their Christian high school before attending King College, where they earned a BA in English emphasizing creative writing and theater.

During their time in college, they founded a Christian band called "Eco Chamber", and came out as gay for the first time as a bandmate. They have recounted pointing at Romans 1 and stating that this is what they struggle with. They subsequently continued to discuss it as a "struggle" with friends before joining Exodus International, where they sought to "evaporate" their queerness. They went on to work as a church planter and as a worship leader. They released their first album, Back As Far As We Can Go, in 2007.

In 2010, they settled on the fact that they were, in fact, gay, and told their pastor, who was also their best friend. He immediately told them that they could no longer serve as a worship leader. By 2014, they had moved to another church in San Diego which was open to them being gay and were in a relationship with a man. In 2017, they launched a podcast called Heathens, focused on Christian deconstruction.

Their first appearance in drag as Flamy Grant was in a video promoting Heathens during the 2020 COVID-19 epidemic, and they continued to appear in drag since. Several months later, they were invited to another church to lead worship in drag. Their post while preparing went viral, and they ultimately decided drag could be their career. They took the name Flamy Grant in honor of Amy Grant, who they view as a personal hero. They collaborated with Derek Webb on his 2023 song "Boys Will Be Girls", Jennifer Knapp, and Semler.

After a post of Webb, Knapp, Grant, and Plumb posing together was put up by Webb in 2023, they were mocked by vocally conservative and anti-LGBTQ+ singer Sean Feucht, who followed up by asserting that drag queens shove "perversion" at children. He also claimed she was "sick, twisted and yes demonic". The four ultimately decided to use it to their advantage to garner attention, and Grant took to TikTok to try to rally her audience to prove Feucht wrong by getting her song "Good Day", a worship song which she had written in 2016, somewhere on the iTunes Christian Charts. Within 24 hours, it had briefly hit No. 1, and the album to which it was the lead single, Bible Belt Baby, Grant's debut album as a drag queen, spent seven days topping the iTunes Christian Album Chart. The album was described by The Guardian as having "the delicate yet powerful range of a worship band leader". This made her the first drag performer to top the iTunes Christian Charts. It included a cover of an Amy Grant song, Takes A Little Time. In September of that same year, she left her day job to become a full-time singer-songwriter.

She submitted that album for consideration to the Grammy Award for Best Contemporary Christian Music Album, but it was recategorized to consideration in the Grammy Award for Best Pop Vocal Album without her knowledge. The Recording Academy stated that this was due to profanity in the song, but Grant has claimed "suspicions" that "a drag queen in that (Christian) category would be too much". She also stated that she "never expected to encounter religious gatekeeping at the Grammies." She also chose to attend the Dove Awards that year despite the award's refusal to consider LGBTQ+ singers in the past and refusal to consider Grant, stating "I see value in taking up space in this world as a queer person" and asserting that she would bring "queer joy" to "our little corner of the room".

Her album CHURCH appeared on the iTunes Country Charts in 2024. The album discussed religious trauma, and was called a sign of "the end times" by a fellow Christian singer. It was reviewed positively, however: No Depression's Rachel Cholst stated Grant uses "the ferocious vision of a prophet and the ironic zingers of a RuPaul's Drag Race panel" and that "if there were any doubts about [Grant's] artistic prowess, her latest offering... should put them to bed", while At The Barrier's John Barlass stated the album "will blow your socks off".

She has since frequently performed at churches, and has asserted in a year she performed at more than 40 different churches. These church performances have had threats of protests, though the protests have not always actually occurred. Her songs have also been used at church worships. Her music largely includes themes of religious deconstruction and has been described by The Guardian as part "queer anthem", part "Christian worship song". She is an exvangelical and has been described by The Christian Century as "unexpectedly maternal".

In 2023, she was nominated for a QueerX award for Best Drag Artist. In 2024, she was nominated for a Queerty Award for Drag Royalty. In 2025, she was nominated for Best Artist at the International Folk Music Awards, and at the same awards in 2026 she was nominated for Album of the Year.

In 2023, she was a plaintiff in a case against the Blount County Police Chief and DA, who had sent a letter to a pride parade she was to perform at threatening prosecution if Grant or any other drag performers were to appear. In 2026, she criticized gay rights activist Matthew Vines's op-ed, which claimed being gay "is not a rebellion against ordinary life", asserting "there is no such thing as an ordinary gay person" and "our subversion of social norms is our power".

Her fourth album, Gloryhound, is set to be released in Fall 2026.

== Discography ==
Albums
Title	Year	iTunes Country Charts	iTunes Christian Charts
Gloryhound (upcoming)	2026	-	-
CHURCH	2025	8	-
Bible Belt Baby	2022	-	1
Back As Far As We Can Go	2007	-	-

Singles
Title	Year	Billboard Christian Digital Song Sales	iTunes Christian Charts	Reference
"Something To Come Home To"	2026	-	-	
"Love Too Much"	2026	-	-	
"Magna Mater"	2025	-	-	
"If You Ever Leave"	2024	-	-	
"The Whole World is Waiting" with The Many, Kate Hurley, and The Calendar Years	2023	-	-	
"Fortune Teller"	2023	-	-	
"I Think I See The Light"	2023	-	-	
"Esther, Ruth, and Rahab"	2022	-	-	
"I Am Not Ashamed"	2022	-	-	
"What Did You Drag Me Into?"	2022	-	-	
"Everything's Made Up"	2022	-	-	
"Good Day"	2022	20	1	
