= Jean Harris (activist) =

American activist (1944–2011)

Jean Harris (October 24, 1944 – June 25, 2011), born Kathie Jean Shafer, was an American Democratic and LGBT rights activist.

Harris was raised in Long Beach, California. She married John Lee Harris on July 1, 1966, and went on to have two daughters. During this time, she earned a degree from California State University, Long Beach. After her divorce in 1976, Harris came out and moved to Santa Cruz, California before returning to San Francisco in the mid-1980s. She then undertook post-graduate work at San Francisco State University.

A longtime force in San Francisco politics, Harris served as chief of staff to former San Francisco Supervisor Harry Britt, who was appointed to the board in 1978 following the assassination of Supervisor Harvey Milk. Harris was heavily involved in both LGBT and democratic politics and lived the view that exercising the right to vote in democracy constituted the fundamental power to create political progressive change in the United States. As such, Harris's campaigns emphasized grass roots organizing and "get out the vote" strategies.

Along with campaign co-chair Melinda Paras, Jean led the first successful campaign for lesbian and gay domestic partnership rights in the United States. The ballot measure, which was known as Proposition K, passed in 1990. A recall campaign was also opposed by Harris and soundly rejected the next year. With legal help from prominent LGBT attorney Matt Coles, Harris and Paras purposefully structured domestic partnership to mirror the legal responsibilities for marriage in order to demonstrate that there was no difference between the institution of marriage and domestic partnership other than a separate but equal limitation. Jean also served as the chair of the California Democratic Party's Lesbian and Gay Caucus and as the president of the Harvey Milk Lesbian, Gay, Bisexual, Transgender Democratic Club. She then went on to the post of deputy mayor under Frank Jordan when he took office in 1992 and subsequently served as the deputy director of the San Francisco Health Department.

Harris was heavily involved in LGBT causes, including strategizing the campaigns of numerous LGBT California candidates (including Carole Migden) and serving as the founding director of Basic Rights Oregon. In that position she helped organize the defeat of a 2000 ballot initiative that would have barred schools from "'encouraging, promoting or sanctioning' homosexual or bisexual behaviors". Following her time in Oregon, Harris returned to California and created CAPE, the California Alliance for Pride and Equality, today known as Equality California and became its executive director. During her tenure she worked to secure passage of a 2001 law to secure for same-sex domestic partners many of the rights formerly reserved to married couples.

Harris campaigned for Howard Dean during his unsuccessful 2004 bid for the Democratic presidential nomination.

Harris died at her home in Palm Springs, California on June 25, 2011.
