= Equal Access to Intrastate Commerce Act =

2011 Tennessee law

The Equal Access to Intrastate Commerce Act is a 2011 Tennessee act that amends the Tennessee Human Rights Act to define the term "sex" to mean an individual person as male or female as indicated on the individual's birth certificate and prohibits, with exception to employees of a local government, any local government in Tennessee from enacting ordinances, resolutions, or any other means impose on or make applicable to any person an anti-discrimination practice, standard, definition, or provision that is not covered by statewide anti-discrimination laws.

== Background ==
In April 2011, the Council of Metropolitan Government of Nashville and Davidson County amended chapter 4.28 of the Metropolitan Code in response, according to the preamble of the amendment, adding sexual orientation and gender identity to the classes of persons protected by equal opportunity provisions applicable to government contractors.

== Legislative history ==
On May 12, 2011, the state Tennessee State Senate voted 20–8 in favor of HB 600. On May 18, 2011, the Tennessee House of Representatives voted 70–26 in favor of the bill. On May 23, 2011, Governor Bill Haslam signed the bill into law. On May 31, 2011, it became Public Chapter 278.

== Lisa Howe, et al. v. Bill Haslam ==
On November 4, 2014, in the case of Lisa Howe, et al. v. Bill Haslam, the Tennessee Court of Appeals dismissed the claims of the plaintiffs Wesley Roberts and the Gay/Straight Alliance of Hume-Fogg Academic Magnet High School for lack of standing.

== See also ==
- LGBT rights in Tennessee
- State bans on local anti-discrimination laws in the United States
