= List of United States federal courthouses in Tennessee =

Following is a list of current and former courthouses of the United States federal court system located in Tennessee. Each entry indicates the name of the building along with an image, if available, its location and the jurisdiction it covers, the dates during which it was used for each such jurisdiction, and, if applicable the person for whom it was named, and the date of renaming. Dates of use will not necessarily correspond with the dates of construction or demolition of a building, as pre-existing structures may be adapted or court use, and former court buildings may later be put to other uses. Also, the official name of the building may be changed at some point after its use as a federal court building has been initiated.

== Courthouses ==
Courthouse	City	Image	Street address	Jurisdiction	Dates of use	Named for
U.S. Post Office†	Bristol		620 Shelby Street	E.D. Tenn.	?	n/a
U.S. Post Office & Courthouse†	Chattanooga		East 11th and Lindsay Streets	E.D. Tenn.	1893–1933; 1991–present	n/a
Joel W. Solomon Federal Building and U.S. Courthouse†	Chattanooga		900 Georgia Avenue	E.D. Tenn.	1933–present	Administrator of the General Services Administration Joel W. Solomon (1981)
U.S. Post Office & Courthouse†	Columbia		815 South Garden Street	M.D. Tenn.	1941–present	n/a
L. Clure Morton U.S. Post Office and Courthouse†	Cookeville		9 East Broad Street	M.D. Tenn.	1916–present	District Court judge Leland Clure Morton (1996)
U.S. Post Office & Courthouse	Greeneville		101 West Summer Street	E.D. Tenn.	1905–? Now the Greeneville Federal Bank.	n/a
James H. Quillen U.S. Courthouse	Greeneville		220 West Depot Street	E.D. Tenn.	2001–present	U.S. Rep. James H. Quillen
U.S. Court House & Post Office	Jackson		Baltimore St.	W.D. Tenn.	1888–1934; Building razed.	n/a
Ed Jones Federal Building and U.S. Courthouse†	Jackson	109 South Highland Avenue	W.D. Tenn.	1934–present	U.S. Rep. Ed Jones (1988)	
U.S. Court House & Post Office†	Knoxville		600 Market Street	E.D. Tenn.	1874–1933; Later used by the Tennessee Valley Authority; now the East Tennessee Historical Center.	n/a
U.S. Post Office & Courthouse†	Knoxville		501 Main Street	E.D. Tenn.	1934–1998; Now in use by the Tennessee state courts and a post office.	n/a
Howard H. Baker, Jr. U.S. Courthouse	Knoxville		800 Market Street	E.D. Tenn.	?–present Completed in 1991.	U.S. Sen. Howard H. Baker, Jr.
U.S. Custom House, Courthouse, and Post Office†	Memphis		1 North Front Street	W.D. Tenn.	1885–? Expanded in 1930; Now the Cecil C. Humphreys School of Law.	n/a
Odell Horton Federal Building	Memphis		167 North Main Street	W.D. Tenn.	ca. 1963–present	Odell Horton (2007)
U.S. Customs House†	Nashville		701 Broadway	M.D. Tenn.	1882–1952; 1992–present Now privately owned and leased by the government.	n/a
Estes Kefauver Federal Bldg. and U.S. Courthouse†	Nashville		801 Broadway	M.D. Tenn.	1952–present	U.S. Sen. Estes Kefauver
Fred D. Thompson U.S. Courthouse and Federal Building	Nashville		719 Church Street	M.D. Tenn.	2022–present	U.S. Sen. and actor Fred Thompson
U.S. Post Office & Courthouse	Winchester		200 South Jefferson Street	E.D. Tenn.	?–present	n/a

== Key ==
^{†}	Listed on the National Register of Historic Places (NRHP)
^{††}	NRHP-listed and also designated as a National Historic Landmark
