= 2014 Tennessee Amendment 1 =

Amendment 1
- November 4, 2014
- Shall Article I, of the Constitution of Tennessee be amended by adding the following language as a new, appropriately designated section: Nothing in this Constitution secures or protects a right to abortion or requires the funding of an abortion. The people retain the right through their elected state representatives and state senators to enact, amend, or repeal statutes regarding abortion, including, but not limited to, circumstances of pregnancy resulting from rape or incest or when necessary to save the life of the mother.

Results
Choice	Votes	%
Yes	729,163	52.60%
No	657,192	47.40%
Valid votes	1,386,355	100.00%
Invalid or blank votes	0	0.00%
Total votes	1,386,355	100.00%
Registered voters/turnout		35.97%
- Yes: 50–60% 60–70% 70–80% 80–90% 90–100% No: 50–60% 60–70% 70–80% 80–90% 90–100% No data

The Tennessee Constitutional Amendment: 1, commonly known as Amendment 1 or the No State Constitutional Right to Abortion and Legislative Power to Regulate Abortion Amendment, is an approved legislatively referred constitutional amendment to the Constitution of Tennessee that appeared on the ballot on November 4, 2014. The amendment would ensure that Constitution of Tennessee, would not support, fund, or protect the right to an abortion.

== Content ==
The amendment added the following to Article I of the Constitution of Tennessee:

"Nothing in this Constitution secures or protects a right to abortion or requires the funding of an abortion. The people retain the right through their elected state representatives and state senators to enact, amend, or repeal statutes regarding abortion, including, but not limited to, circumstances of pregnancy resulting from rape or incest or when necessary to save the life of the mother."

The following is the official text from the Tennessee Secretary of State, that appeared on the ballot:

"Shall Article I, of the Constitution of Tennessee be amended by adding the following language as a new, appropriately designated section?

Nothing in this Constitution secures or protects a right to abortion or requires the funding of an abortion. The people retain the right through their elected state representatives and state senators to enact, amend, or repeal statutes regarding abortion, including, but not limited to, circumstances of pregnancy resulting from rape or incest or when necessary to save the life of the mother."

A vote for Amendment 1 supports ensuring the Constitution of Tennessee does not uphold most abortions and supporting the General Assembly having power to pass laws regarding the regulation of abortion.

A vote against Amendment 1 opposes this amendment and restricts the General Assembly from creating legislation or passing laws that regulate abortion.

== Supporters ==
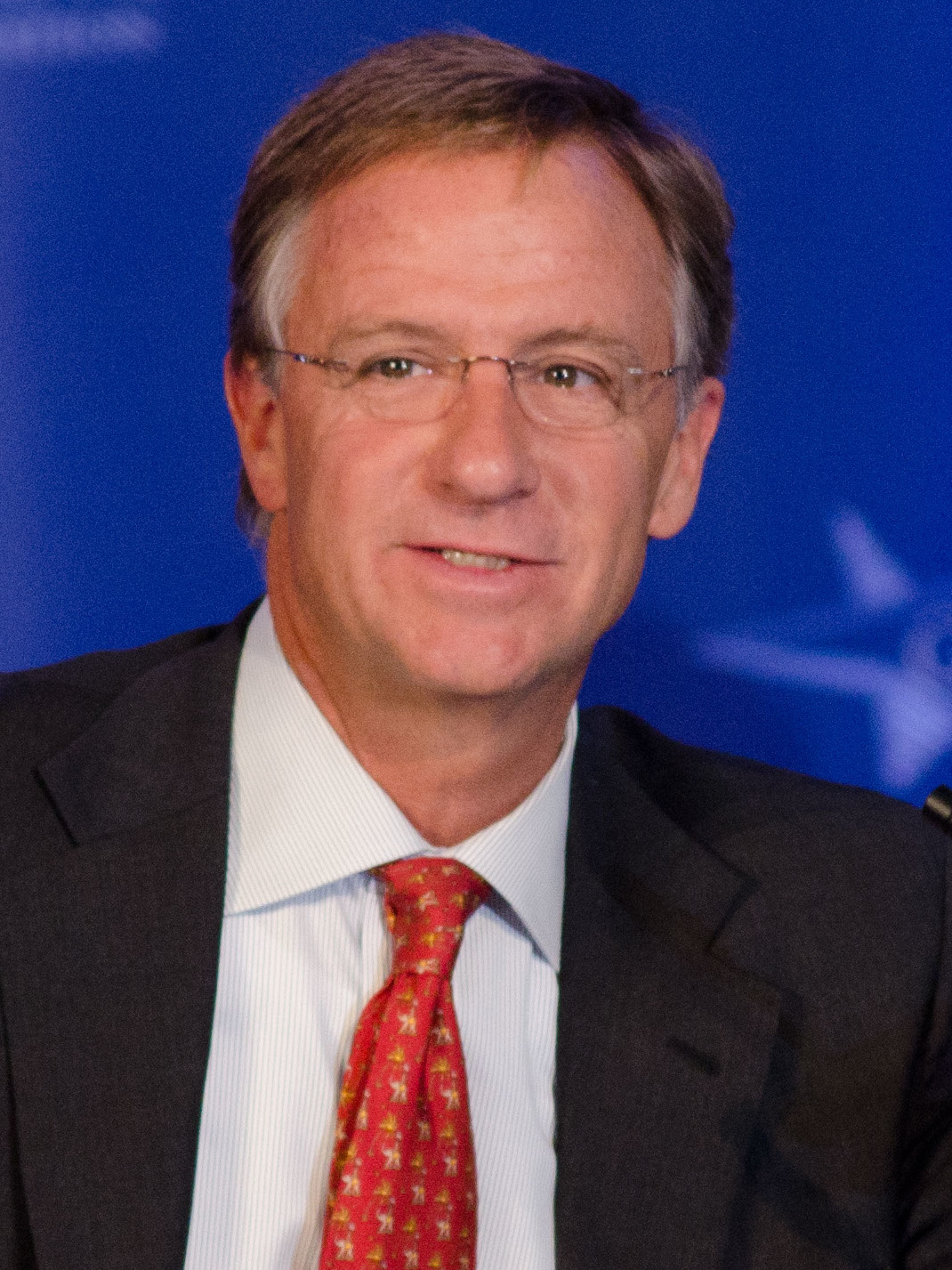
Governor Bill Haslam, was one of the well-known supporters of Amendment 1

Officials and politicians, mainly Republicans, voiced their support for the amendment, both during the vote on it in the General Assembly and when it appeared on the ballot. Pro-life organizations, such as Tennessee Right to Life and Americans United for Life, also voiced strong support for the amendment. Leslie Hunse, the education director for Tennessee Right to Life, said, "We want our constitution to go back to neutral on the issue of abortion, so we can pass some common sense regulations to protect mothers and children."

"Yes on 1" was the main organization supporting the campaign, with signs and television advertisements.

== Opponents ==
Vote NO on One Tennessee led the campaign in opposition to the ballot measure. Representatives, senators, and some faith leaders opposed the amendment. The ACLU and Planned Parenthood, among other large organizations, also opposed the amendment, and contributed large campaign contributions up to the election. Planned Parenthood organizations nationwide, spent a total of nearly $2 million, in campaign contributions opposing Amendment 1, while the ACLU donated $135,000 in opposition.

State Senator Roy Herron said, "Their pitch is that this would make the constitution neutral on abortion. How would they like the Constitution neutral on the Second Amendment so legislators could outlaw the right to bear arms? How about making the First Amendment neutral?"

Nashville-based, statewide newspaper, The Tennessean, also opposed this amendment, stating, "Making any type of law immune from a court challenge is shortsighted, prejudicial — and in the case of what should be a woman's own decision about her health — downright dangerous. For those reasons, The Tennessean recommends a vote of no on Amendment 1."

== General election ==
=== Endorsements ===
Yes on 1

State officials

- Bill Haslam (R), Governor of Tennessee (2011-2019)
- Ron Ramsey (R), Lieutenant Governor of Tennessee (2007-2017)
- Lamar Alexander (R), US Senator (R-TN) and former Governor of Tennessee
- Beth Harwell (R), Speaker of the Tennessee House of Representatives (2011-2018)

Former state legislators

- David Fowler (R), former member of the Tennessee Senate, from the 11th district

Organizations

- Tennessee Right to Life

Notable Individuals

- Jim Bob Duggar, former Arkansas state representative and television personality
- Richard F. Stika, Bishop of the Diocese of Knoxville
Vote NO on One Tennessee

State officials

- Gloria Johnson (D) member of the Tennessee House of Representatives from the 13th district

Former state legislators

- Roy Herron (D), former member of the Tennessee Senate, from the 24th district

Organizations

- Tennessee Democratic Party
- Planned Parenthood
- American Civil Liberties Union
- Tennesseans for Preservation of Personal Privacy

=== Polling ===
Poll source	Date(s) administered	Sample size	Margin of error	For Amendment 1	Against Amendment 1	Undecided
Middle Tennessee State University	October 22–26, 2014	600	± 4.0%	39%	32%	29%
Remington Research	September 24–25, 2014	600	± 4.0%	50%	22%	28%
Vanderbilt University	April 28-May 18, 2014	1,505	± 3.4%	23%	71%	6%

=== Results ===
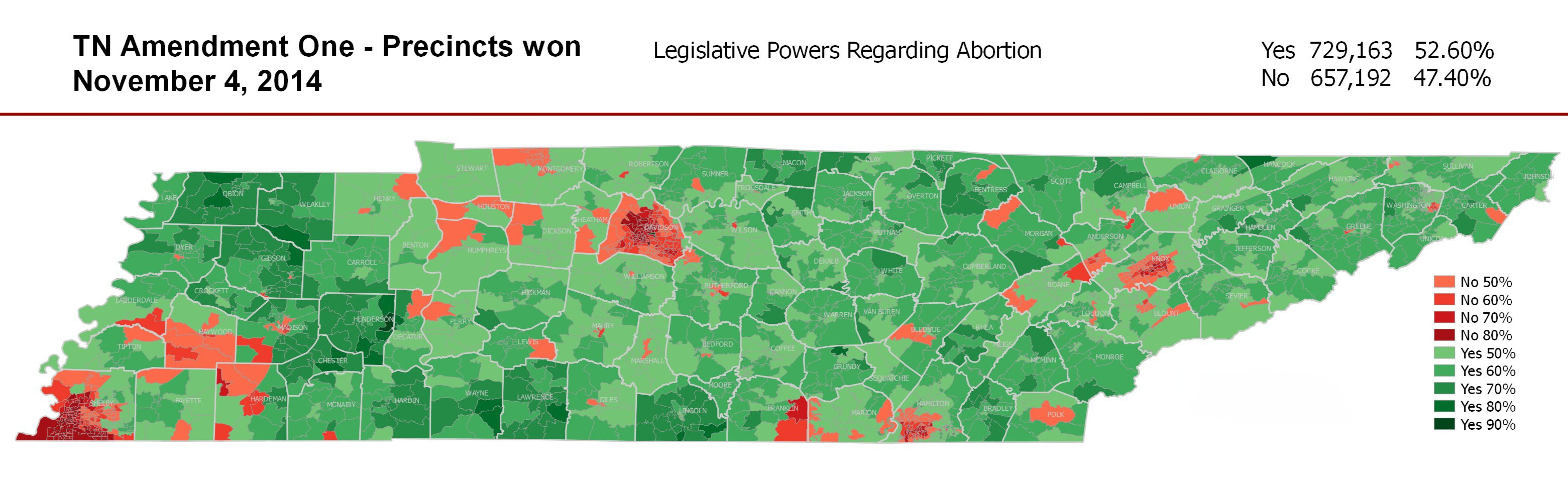
Precinct results

Amendment 1
Choice	Votes	%
For	729,163	52.60
Against	657,192	47.40
Total	1,386,355	100.00
Source: Secretary of State of Tennessee

=== By county ===
County	Yes		No		Total votes
County	%	#	%	#	Total votes
Anderson	50.54%	9,213	49.46%	9,016	18,229
Bedford	59.98%	4,634	40.02%	3,092	7,726
Benton	58.61%	2,188	41.39%	1,545	3,733
Bledsoe	62.97%	1,660	37.03%	976	2,636
Blount	54.01%	16,364	45.99%	13,934	30,298
Bradley	68.87%	14,122	31.13%	6,384	20,506
Campbell	62.14%	4,008	37.86%	2,442	6,450
Cannon	62.82%	1,833	37.18%	1,085	2,918
Carroll	66.08%	4,142	33.92%	2,126	6,268
Carter	64.78%	7,026	35.22%	3,820	10,846
Cheatham	53.72%	4,738	46.28%	4,081	8,819
Chester	75.88%	2,615	24.12%	831	3,446
Claiborne	59.17%	3,138	40.83%	2,165	5,303
Clay	62.85%	939	37.15%	555	1,494
Cocke	60.64%	4,286	39.36%	2,782	7,068
Coffee	57.81%	6,695	42.19%	4,887	11,582
Crockett	69.03%	2,013	30.97%	903	2,916
Cumberland	60.39%	9,885	39.61%	6,484	16,369
Davidson	33.65%	46,717	66.35%	92,098	138,815
Decatur	63.01%	1,443	36.99%	847	2,290
DeKalb	61.68%	2,282	38.32%	1,418	3,700
Dickson	54.25%	5,726	45.75%	4,829	10,555
Dyer	64.32%	4,651	35.68%	2,580	7,231
Fayette	58.71%	6,144	41.29%	4,320	10,464
Fentress	68.67%	2,262	31.33%	1,032	3,294
Franklin	56.74%	5,473	43.26%	4,172	9,645
Gibson	71.50%	7,989	28.50%	3,184	11,173
Giles	57.23%	3,194	42.77%	2,387	5,581
Grainger	61.64%	2,552	38.36%	1,588	4,140
Greene	61.60%	8,043	38.40%	5,014	13,057
Grundy	63.72%	1,530	36.28%	871	2,401
Hamblen	66.31%	7,530	33.69%	3,825	11,355
Hamilton	49.01%	39,817	50.99%	41,421	81,238
Hancock	63.92%	606	36.08%	342	948
Hardeman	49.87%	2,464	50.13%	2,477	4,941
Hardin	67.35%	3,385	32.65%	1,641	5,026
Hawkins	63.54%	6,667	36.46%	3,825	10,492
Haywood	48.68%	1,683	51.32%	1,774	3,457
Henderson	75.33%	3,805	24.67%	1,246	5,051
Henry	56.28%	4,013	43.72%	3,118	7,131
Hickman	58.13%	2,653	41.87%	1,911	4,564
Houston	48.62%	864	51.38%	913	1,777
Humphreys	55.47%	2,324	44.53%	1,866	4,190
Jackson	63.20%	1,635	36.80%	952	2,587
Jefferson	61.92%	6,509	38.08%	4,003	10,512
Johnson	63.95%	2,029	36.05%	1,144	3,173
Knox	48.33%	50,635	51.67%	54,124	104,759
Lake	68.57%	650	31.43%	298	948
Lauderdale	55.82%	2,254	44.18%	1,784	4,038
Lawrence	73.40%	6,549	26.60%	2,374	8,923
Lewis	63.39%	1,797	36.61%	1,038	2,835
Lincoln	72.99%	4,394	27.01%	1,626	6,020
Loudon	56.50%	8,319	43.50%	6,405	14,724
Macon	68.04%	2,272	31.96%	1,067	3,339
Madison	62.66%	14,508	37.34%	8,647	23,155
Marion	53.92%	3,389	46.08%	2,896	6,285
Marshall	54.81%	3,318	45.19%	2,736	6,054
Maury	57.61%	11,038	42.39%	8,121	19,159
McMinn	65.89%	7,060	34.11%	3,654	10,714
McNairy	63.48%	3,399	36.52%	1,955	5,354
Meigs	58.64%	1,293	41.36%	912	2,205
Monroe	61.78%	6,172	38.22%	3,819	9,991
Montgomery	50.70%	14,841	49.30%	14,433	29,274
Moore	65.53%	1,158	34.47%	609	1,767
Morgan	62.66%	2,317	37.34%	1,381	3,698
Obion	76.58%	4,937	23.42%	1,510	6,447
Overton	63.75%	2,624	36.25%	1,492	4,116
Perry	53.75%	760	46.25%	654	1,414
Pickett	64.70%	1,083	35.30%	591	1,674
Polk	60.02%	2,142	39.98%	1,427	3,569
Putnam	61.74%	9,380	38.26%	5,813	15,193
Rhea	67.51%	4,069	32.49%	1,958	6,027
Roane	54.33%	7,381	45.67%	6,204	13,585
Robertson	56.69%	8,070	43.31%	6,165	14,235
Rutherford	56.26%	31,688	43.74%	24,634	56,322
Scott	66.38%	2,032	33.62%	1,029	3,061
Sequatchie	62.12%	1,935	37.88%	1,180	3,115
Sevier	61.59%	11,827	38.41%	7,375	19,202
Shelby	37.10%	69,292	62.90%	117,472	186,764
Smith	61.77%	2,697	38.23%	1,669	4,366
Stewart	55.42%	1,647	44.58%	1,325	2,972
Sullivan	59.24%	19,700	40.76%	13,553	33,253
Sumner	59.42%	22,658	40.58%	15,476	38,134
Tipton	58.28%	7,101	41.72%	5,084	12,185
Trousdale	56.00%	887	44.00%	697	1,584
Unicoi	63.34%	2,481	36.66%	1,436	3,917
Union	56.00%	1,675	44.00%	1,316	2,991
Van Buren	60.50%	928	39.50%	606	1,534
Warren	62.69%	4,921	37.31%	2,929	7,850
Washington	57.71%	15,515	42.29%	11,367	26,882
Wayne	69.50%	1,914	30.50%	840	2,754
Weakley	71.77%	5,152	28.23%	2,026	7,178
White	65.49%	4,047	34.51%	2,133	6,180
Williamson	56.57%	34,422	43.43%	26,425	60,847
Wilson	57.12%	17,346	42.88%	13,021	30,367
Total	52.60%	729,163	47.40%	657,192	1,386,355

== Analysis ==
The results for Amendment 1 revealed a significant urban-rural divide across Tennessee. While major urban centers showed the most concentrated opposition to the measure, the amendment found its strongest support in the rural regions of the state. Specifically, the band of rural counties located between the Nashville and Memphis metropolitan areas. Similarly, East Tennessee remained a stronghold for the "Yes" vote, with the exceptions of Knox and Hamilton counties, which saw higher levels of opposition than their more rural neighbors. Notably, the only rural counties to vote in opposition were Haywood and Hickman in West Tennessee and Houston in Middle Tennessee; at the time these areas were characterized as ancestral Democratic strongholds where some Democrats continued to hold local offices.

The geographic split was further defined by the influence of suburban and exurban counties. In Shelby and Davidson counties, the "No" vote defeated "Yes" by a 64–36 margin; however, these two population centers accounted for only 27% of the statewide electorate. The amendment's success was heavily bolstered by the six suburban counties surrounding Nashville—including Williamson, which had the state's highest turnout at 44.6%—which together provided approximately 40% of the statewide "Yes" margin. Despite the "No" campaign outspending the "Yes" side by a 3-to-1 margin in the final month, the measure passed amid a low-turnout midterm environment where grassroots and church-based mobilization in rural areas proved decisive.

Political analysts noted that because the 2014 gubernatorial and U.S. Senate races were largely non-competitive, the amendment became the primary driver for "true believer" voters who may not have otherwise participated in the midterm. Experts suggested the amendment might not have passed in a higher-turnout presidential election year where the electorate is typically more left-leaning. Notably, this amendment had more votes cast than the governor and Senate election.

== Lawsuit regarding counting of votes ==
=== George et al. v. Haslam et al. ===
In 2014, Tracey E. George, along with 4 others, filed a lawsuit in the United States District Court for Middle Tennessee, alleging that the state's method of counting votes for the amendment was unconstitutional. They argued that the state violated the Tennessee Constitution by not ensuring that voters who supported the amendment also voted in the gubernatorial race. The state's defense claimed their approach was based on constitutional interpretation and historical practice. The court denied the state's request to dismiss the case. In response, state attorneys filed a counter-suit in a Williamson County court, asserting that their vote-counting method aligned with the state constitution.

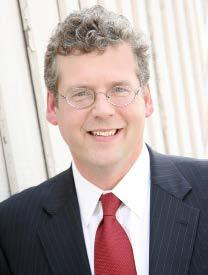
Judge Kevin H. Sharp

On April 21, 2016, Williamson County Judge Michael Binkley sided with the state, allowing votes from individuals who didn't participate in the gubernatorial race to be counted for the amendment. However, the next day, federal judge Kevin H. Sharp ruled against the state in the original federal lawsuit. He stated that only votes from individuals who also voted for gubernatorial candidates should be considered valid for the amendment. Judge Sharp emphasized the inequality in weighing votes, where those who voted against Amendment 1 and for governor were not given the same significance as those who voted in favor of the amendment but did not participate in the governor's race. Consequently, Sharp ordered the state to recount the 2014 election results.

On April 26, 2016, Tennessee Attorney General Herbert Slatery appealed Sharp's ruling to the U.S. Court of Appeals for the Sixth Circuit, asserting that the matter of determining the required vote to amend the Tennessee Constitution should be decided by state law and Tennessee courts. State attorneys requested a postponement of the recount until the appeal was resolved, citing the need to avoid additional strain on election officials preparing for upcoming elections. On January 9, 2018, the Sixth Circuit, in a unanimous decision, stated that the plaintiffs failed to demonstrate how the state had diluted their votes, emphasizing that federal intervention in a lawful state election process was unwarranted. The court concluded that the controversy surrounding the 2014 approval of Amendment 1 needed resolution. The plaintiffs then appealed to the U.S. Supreme Court, which declined to hear the case on October 1, 2018.

== See also ==
- 2014 Tennessee elections
