= Fred D. Thompson U.S. Courthouse and Federal Building =

Fred D. Thompson Federal US Courthouse and Federal Building
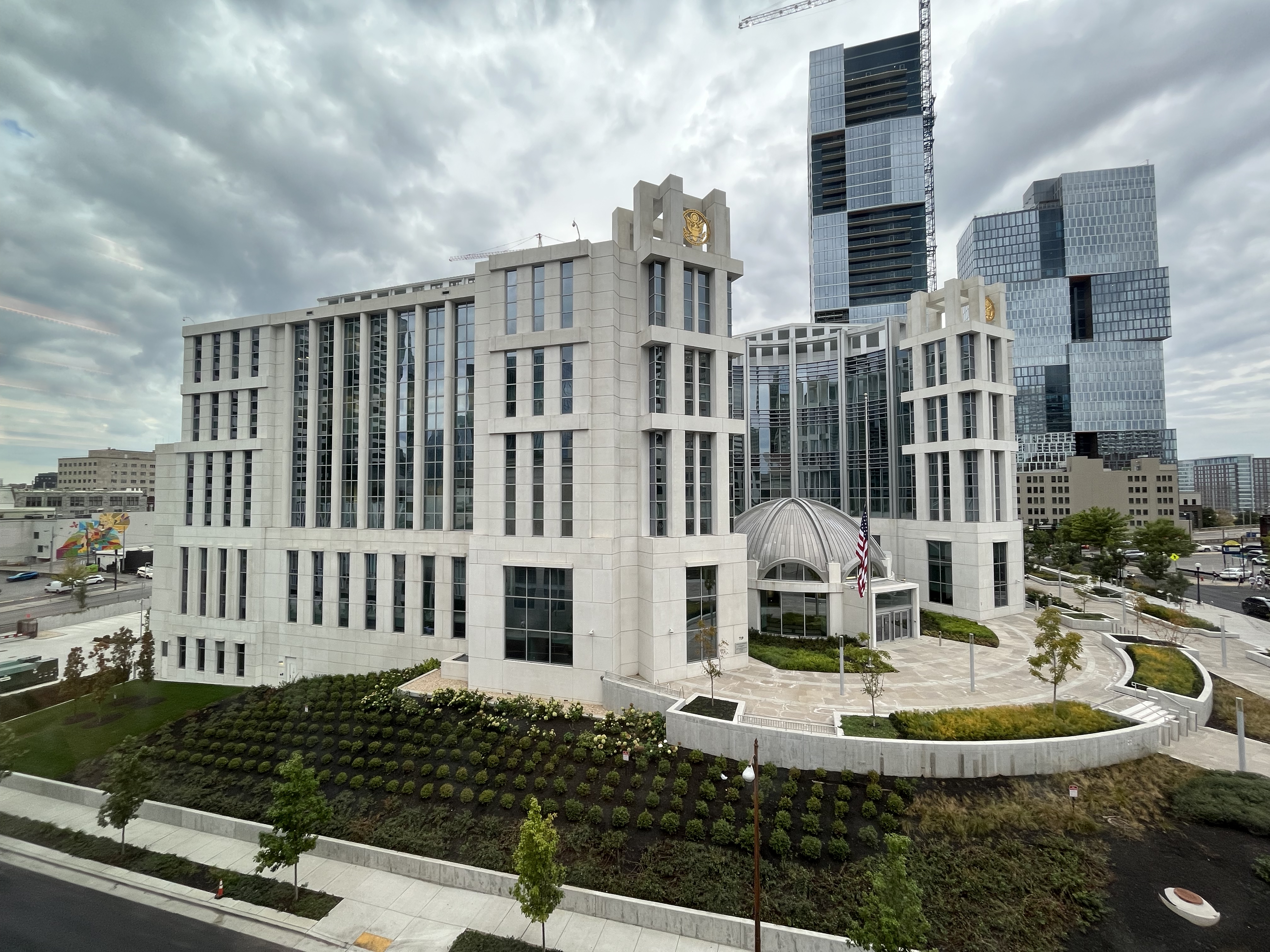
- The building in 2023

General information
- Architectural style: Classical-Modern Hybrid
- Location: 719 Church St., Nashville, Tennessee
- Coordinates: 36°9′42″N 86°46′58″W
- Completed: 2022

Design and construction
- Architect(s): Fentress Architects

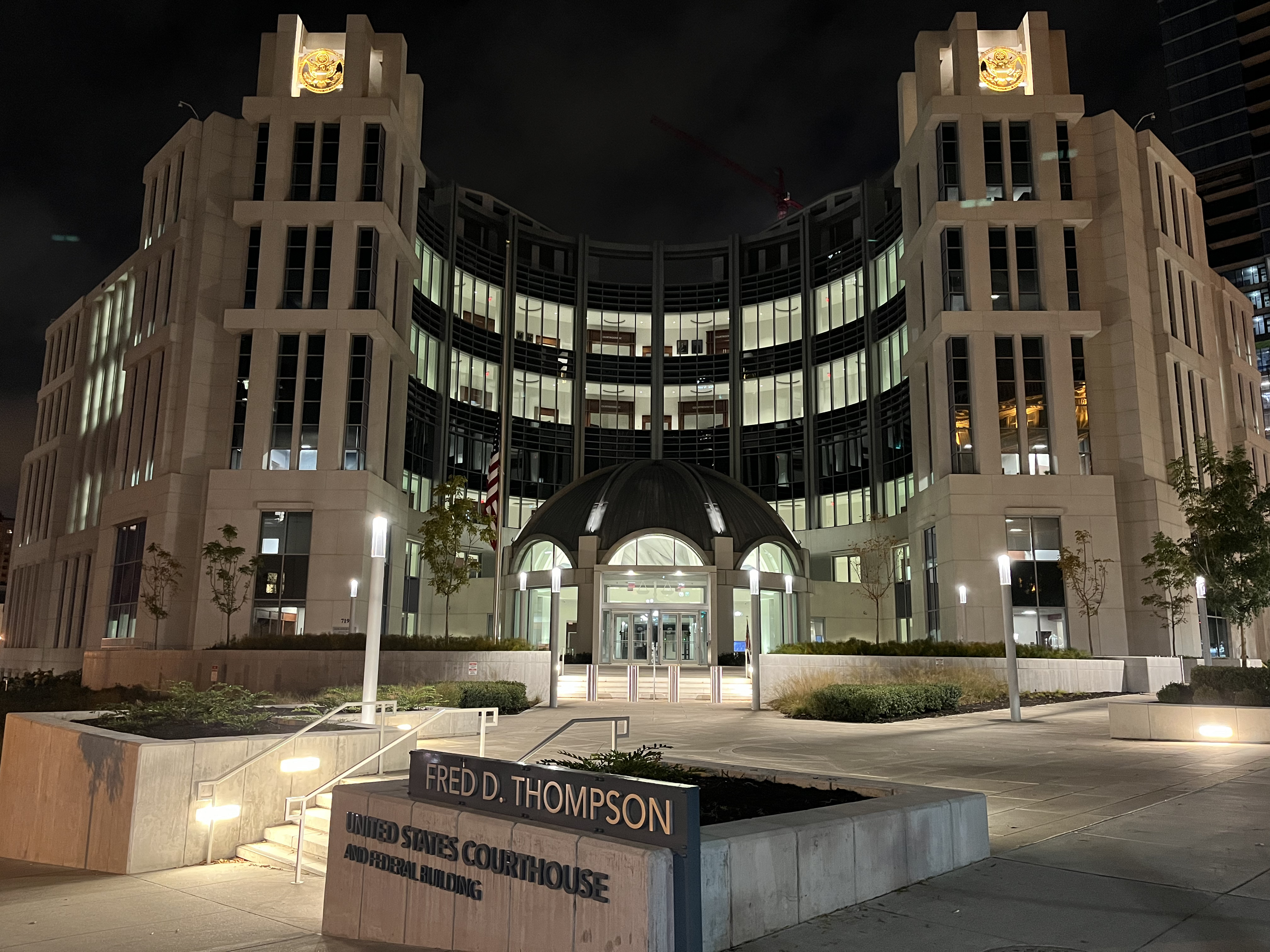
The building at night in 2023

The Fred D. Thompson U.S. Courthouse and Federal Building is a United States federal courthouse of the United States District Court for the Middle District of Tennessee, in downtown Nashville, Tennessee. It is located at 719 Church Street, northeast of the older Estes Kefauver Federal Building and United States Courthouse. The architect of record is Fentress Architects, and it opened on September 23, 2022.

== History ==
The courthouse is one of eight for which funds were appropriated by Congress in late 2015. The United States House of Representatives voted in 2016 to name the courthouse for actor and politician Fred Thompson, but the Congress expired before the Senate could put the question to a vote. It passed in the House again in March 2017, and in the Senate in May 2017. President Trump signed the bill into law in June 2017.

== Structure ==
The building is 275,000 square feet, and "features an abundance of natural light". It houses "eight courtrooms, 11 judges' chambers and space for the district's probation and pretrial services offices, U.S. marshal's office, and U.S. attorney's office as well as GSA and U.S. Senate offices". The ceiling of the courthouse rotunda features a Greco-Roman style mosaic of "striking folds of white robes, composed of thousands of pieces of glass".

== See also ==
- Estes Kefauver Federal Building and United States Courthouse
- Customs House (Nashville, Tennessee)
- List of United States federal courthouses in Tennessee
