= O'Kroley v. Fastcase, Inc. =

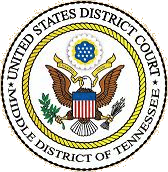
- Court: United States District Court for the Middle District of Tennessee
- Full case name: Colin O'Kroley v. Fastcase, Inc.; Google, Inc.; Texas Office of Court Administration; 11th Court of Appeals; Yasni.com
- Decided: June 25, 2014
- Citations: 2014 WL 2197029, aff'd, No. 15-6336 (6th Cir. July 22, 2016)

Court membership
- Judges sitting: Todd J. Campbell (District Court); Jeffrey S. Sutton (Court of Appeals)

O'Kroley v. Fastcase, Inc., (M.D. Tenn. May 27, 2014), aff'd, No. 15-6336 (6th Cir. July 22, 2016), is a U.S. court case concerning defamation in online search results. The plaintiff, Colin O'Kroley, alleged that Google's automated snippet algorithm created a defamatory search result by falsely implying that the plaintiff had been accused of indecency with a child. The District Court granted Google's motion to dismiss the case, and found that Google had immunity from the defamation charges under Section 230 of the Communications Decency Act, which protects interactive computer services from being held liable as a speaker or publisher for information provided by a third-party information content provider. On appeal, the United States Court of Appeals for the Sixth Circuit affirmed the District Court's decision.

== Facts ==
The plaintiff, Colin O'Kroley, performed a Google search of his own name in August 2012. Among the search results was an entry that included the snippet:

Texas Advance Sheet March 2012 — Google Books Result books.google.com/books?id=kO1rxn9COwsC. . . Fastcase — 2012. . .indecency with a child in Trial Court Cause N . . . Colin O'Kroley v. Pringle. (Tex. App., 2012). MEMORANDUM OPINION On February 9, 2012, Colin O'Kroley filed in.

This snippet was generated by a Google algorithm, summarizing an ebook page produced from an ebook produced by Fastcase. The plaintiff alleged that, despite the underlying source document not containing any defamatory statements, the action of summarizing the document created defamatory statements. Google's algorithm removed the context of the O'Kroley v. Pringle lawsuit and created an implicit association between a case involving indecency with a child and the O'Kroley lawsuit when, in reality, there was no relation other than being published on the same page of court case summaries. The plaintiff claimed several causes of action stemming from this summarized search result.

== Google's motion to dismiss ==
Google filed a motion to dismiss for failure to state a claim under Rule 12(b)(6) of the Federal Rules of Civil Procedure. Under this motion, while the court must accept all well-pleaded factual allegations as true, the complaint must be more than "a formulaic recitation of the elements of a cause of action" as determined in Bell Atlantic Corp. v. Twombly.

Google argued that under Section 230 of the Communications Decency Act, as an "interactive service provider", it has immunity from the plaintiff's complaint. Under the statute, if Google satisfies the requirements for being an interactive computer service, then it has immunity for acting as a publisher of information provided by a third-party. O'Kroley argued that the act of summarizing a non-defamatory article into a defamatory summary created new content and turned Google into an information content provider and thus losing its protected status. However, courts have found the immunities provided under the statute as "quite robust." The magistrate judge reviewing the case found that Google's automated editing and summarization process falls under the role of a publisher and thus Google has immunity from liability. Based on this conclusion, the district judge upheld the magistrate's recommendation and granted Google's motion to dismiss the complaint.

== Appeal ==
On July 22, 2016, the United States Court of Appeals for the Sixth Circuit affirmed the District Court's decision. Writing for the court, Judge Jeffrey S. Sutton held that "[t]he district court got it right" in dismissing each aspect of O'Kroley's claims. With respect to O'Kroley's claim against Google, the court held that Section 230 of the Communications Decency Act barred the claim. Google's "automated editorial acts on the content, such as removing spaces and altering font", did not abrogate Google's statutory immunity, nor did the fact that Google "kept the search result up even after O'Kroley complained about it."

O'Kroley's claims against other defendants were dismissed for procedural reasons, and the court observed that several other points that O'Kroley raised on appeal "rang[ed] from the meritless to the frivolous," stating that "[t]o restate some claims is to reject them."

Despite affirming the dismissal of O'Kroley's complaint in its entirety, the court noted that the lawsuit was not a complete loss for O'Kroley:

In most respects, O'Kroley didn't accomplish much in suing Google and the other defendants. He didn't win. He didn't collect a dime. And the search result about "indecency with a child" remains publicly available. All is not lost, however. Since filing the case, Google users searching for "Colin O'Kroley" no longer see the objectionable search result at the top of the list. Now the top hits all involve this case (there is even a Wikipedia entry on it). So: Even assuming two premises of this lawsuit are true—that there are Internet users other than Colin O'Kroley searching "Colin O'Kroley" and that they look only at the Google previews rather than clicking on and exploring the links—it's not likely that anyone will ever see the offending listing at the root of this lawsuit. Each age has its own form of self-help.
