= Judge Davies =

Judge Davies may refer to:

- Elmer David Davies (1899–1957), judge of the United States District Court for the Middle District of Tennessee
- John Davies (swimmer) (1929–2020), judge of the United States District Court for the Central District of California
- Ronald Davies (judge) (1904–1996), judge of the United States District Court for the District of North Dakota
- William Davies (Georgia judge) (1775–1829), judge of the United States District Court for the District of Georgia
