= Learotha Williams =

American historian (born c. 1967)

- Born: c. 1967; Tallahassee, Florida, U.S.
- Education: Florida State University
- Occupation: Historian
- Employer: Tennessee State University

Learotha Williams (born c. 1967) is an American historian. He is a professor of African-American and Public History at Tennessee State University.

== Early life ==
Williams was born c. 1967 in Tallahassee, Florida. He graduated from Florida State University, where he earned a bachelor's degree followed by a master's degree and a PhD, completed in 2003.

== Career ==
Williams taught African-American history at Armstrong State University from 2004 to 2009. He is now a professor of African American and Public History at Tennessee State University.

Williams researches the history of African-American slaves in Nashville, Tennessee prior to the American Civil War of 1861–1865, including the slave auctions that were held on Charlotte Avenue. He spearheaded the installation of a historical marker on the corner of Fourth Avenue and Charlotte Avenue, which was dedicated on December 7, 2018.

Williams also researches the history of North Nashville, a predominantly black neighborhood, as part of the North Nashville Heritage Project. He has interviewed residents and business owners on its main thoroughfare, Jefferson Street.
