= Judge Gray =

Judge Gray may refer to:

- Frank Gray Jr. (1908–1978), judge of the United States District Court for the Middle District of Tennessee
- George Gray (Delaware politician) (1840–1925), judge of the United States Court of Appeals for the Third Circuit
- William Percival Gray (1912–1992), judge of the United States District Court for the Central District of California

== See also ==
- Jonathan J.C. Grey (born 1982), magistrate judge of the United States District Court for the Eastern District of Michigan
