= General Echols =

General Echols may refer to:

- John Echols (1823–1896), Confederate States Army brigadier general
- Oliver P. Echols (1892–1954), U.S. Army Air Forces major general
- Robert L. Echols (born 1941), U.S. Army National Guard brigadier general
