= Gilbert S. Merritt Jr. =

American judge (1936–2022)

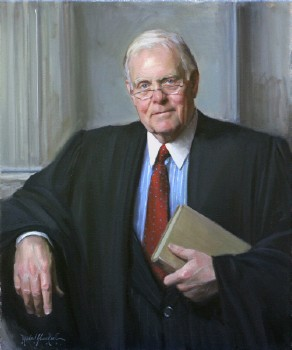

Senior Judge of the United States Court of Appeals for the Sixth Circuit
- In office January 17, 2001 – January 17, 2022

Chief Judge of the United States Court of Appeals for the Sixth Circuit
- In office October 1, 1989 – September 30, 1996
- Preceded by: Albert J. Engel Jr.
- Succeeded by: Boyce F. Martin Jr.

Judge of the United States Court of Appeals for the Sixth Circuit
- In office October 31, 1977 – January 17, 2001
- Appointed by: Jimmy Carter
- Preceded by: William Ernest Miller
- Succeeded by: Julia Smith Gibbons

United States Attorney for the Middle District of Tennessee
- In office 1966–1969
- President: Lyndon B. Johnson
- Preceded by: James F. Neal
- Succeeded by: Charles H. Anderson

Personal details
- Born: Gilbert Stroud Merritt Jr. January 17, 1936 Nashville, Tennessee, U.S.
- Died: January 17, 2022 (aged 86)
- Spouses: Louise Clark Fort (m. 1964; died 1973) Robin Saxon (m. 1992; div. 2006)
- Education: Yale University (BA); Vanderbilt University (LLB); Harvard University (LLM)

Gilbert Stroud Merritt Jr. (January 17, 1936 – January 17, 2022) was an American lawyer and jurist. He served as a United States circuit judge of the United States Court of Appeals for the Sixth Circuit from 1977 to 2022.

== Early life and education ==
Merritt was born on January 17, 1936, in Nashville, Tennessee. He attended public elementary school in Nashville and the Castle Heights Military Academy in Lebanon, Tennessee. Merritt attended Yale University, receiving a Bachelor of Arts in 1957 and a Bachelor of Laws from Vanderbilt University Law School in 1960. As a law student, Merritt was a member of the Order of the Coif and served as managing editor of Vanderbilt Law Review. He served as assistant dean and instructor at Vanderbilt University Law School from 1960 to 1961, and he earned a Master of Laws from Harvard Law School in 1962.

== Legal career ==
Merritt was in private practice in Nashville from 1962 to 1963 with the law firm of Boult, Hunt, Cummins and Connors. He served as an associate metropolitan attorney for the City of Nashville from 1963 to 1966, and as the United States Attorney for the Middle District of Tennessee from 1966 to 1969. From 1969 to 1970 Merritt was an associate professor of law at Vanderbilt University Law School. He returned to private practice in Nashville as a partner in the firm Gullett, Steele, Sanford, Robinson and Merritt from 1970 to 1970, specializing on federal civil and criminal litigation. Merritt served as a lecturer at Vanderbilt University Law School from 1973 to 1975 and as executive secretary of the Tennessee Code Commission in 1977.

== Federal judicial service ==
President Jimmy Carter nominated him to the United States Court of Appeals for the Sixth Circuit on August 25, 1977, for the seat vacated by Judge William Ernest Miller. Merritt was confirmed by the United States Senate on October 29, 1977, and received commission on October 31, 1977. Merritt served as Chief Judge of the court from 1989 to 1996. He assumed senior status on January 17, 2001.

== Supreme Court consideration ==
When Supreme Court Associate Justice Byron White retired in 1993, Merritt was considered a potential nominee, along with Secretary of the Interior Bruce Babbitt and Stephen Breyer of the First Circuit, who was eventually nominated by President Bill Clinton and subsequently joined the Court. Thomas L. Friedman, writing for The New York Times at the time, wrote that Merritt "is considered a moderate who would generate some Republican support" but noted that reports of his consideration "drew the ire" of the Simon Wiesenthal Center, which "criticized Judge Merritt for ordering an inquiry into the Justice Department's handling of the extradition of John Demjanjuk, who was convicted of Nazi war crimes by an Israeli court."

== Person life and later years ==
Merritt was married in 1964 to Louise Clark Fort until her death in 1973. His 1992 marriage to Robin Saxon ended in divorce in 2006.

Merritt resided in Nashville and served as an adjunct professor at Vanderbilt University Law School. He died on January 17, 2022, on his 86th birthday. Merritt was survived by three children, Stroud Merritt, Louise Merritt, and Eli Merritt.

== See also ==
- Bill Clinton Supreme Court candidates
- List of United States federal judges by longevity of service

Legal offices
Preceded by James F. Neal	United States Attorney for the Middle District of Tennessee; 1966–1969	Succeeded by Charles H. Anderson
Preceded by William Ernest Miller	Judge of the United States Court of Appeals for the Sixth Circuit; 1977–2001	Succeeded by Julia Smith Gibbons
Preceded by Albert J. Engel Jr.	Chief Judge of the United States Court of Appeals for the Sixth Circuit; 1989–1996	Succeeded by Boyce F. Martin Jr.
