= Jefferson Street (Nashville) =

Coordinates: 36°10′29.51″N 86°47′7.53″W

Jefferson Street (Nashville)

Jefferson Street is a street in Nashville, Tennessee, U.S., which developed as the historic center of the city's African-American community. Three historically black universities are located near here: Fisk University, Meharry Medical College and Tennessee State University. In the 1940s-1960s, it attracted many rock and roll as well as rhythm and blues artists. It was a center for the Nashville sit-ins in the 1960s, but the construction of Interstate 40 across the street in 1968 led to its economic decline. Since 2011, Lorenzo Washington and his staff at the Jefferson Street Sound Museum, the neighborhood community music museum is conserving the musical legacies of the 1940s through 1970s.

== History ==
In the Antebellum era, the street was a footpath running "from the Hadley plantation on the west to the Cumberland River on the east". It later was improved as a road for wagons and horses. During the American Civil War, it was straddled by Fort Gilliam, a Union Army camp, and a "large campus of runaway slaves were opened in the area." The street was named in honor of U.S President Thomas Jefferson.

After the war, Fisk University was established here and Fort Gilliam became the site of its main building, Jubilee Hall, constructed in 1872. The campus of Tennessee State University was built across Hadley Park, on the western tip of Jefferson Street. By the 1930s, the Meharry Medical College was relocated west of Fisk University from its original location in South Nashville. The street was surrounded by three historically black universities.

By the 1920s–1930s, the street became a popular neighborhood among the black middle class, and many churches, such as Mount Zion Baptist Church, Pleasant Green Baptist Missionary Church and Jefferson Street Missionary Baptist Church, were built here.

In the 1940s–1960s, the street's entertainment venues were a center for rock'n'roll as well as rhythm and blues. Artists including Jimi Hendrix, Etta James, Ray Charles, Little Richard, Otis Redding and Billy Cox played in clubs such as the Del Morocco, the New Era Club, Maceo's, Club Baron or Club Stealaway.

During the Civil Rights era, the street became a center for organizing the Nashville sit-ins. While the protests took place elsewhere (including in Downtown Nashville), activists planned their protests on Jefferson Street, and they were supported by "Jefferson Street business owners and residents."

In the late 1960s, Interstate 40 was built across Jefferson Street, which broke up the black community and contributed heavily to its economic decline. In the 1950s, the Interstate had been projected to be built near the campus of Vanderbilt University, then a whites-only university, but city officials changed their minds shortly thereafter. Before construction began, many residents believed that the Interstate would lead to the economic decline of their neighborhood and divide it from the rest of the city. Some also believed that the routing was an act of racial discrimination, and criticized the state for a lack of transparency about its plans. In October 1967, several residents of Jefferson Street formed the I-40 Steering Committee and filed a lawsuit against the state in the US District Court for the Middle District of Tennessee in the hope forcing a reroute of I-40. Judge Frank Gray Jr. ruled against the committee on November 2, saying that there was no feasible alternate route. Gray conceded, however, that the methods used by the state to notify residents about the project were unsatisfactory and the route would have an adverse effect on Jefferson Street. The organization appealed the decision to the Sixth Circuit, which unanimously upheld the lower court's decision on December 18; and to the Supreme Court, which refused to hear the case on January 29, 1968. As a result, many African American residents were displaced and moved to the Bordeaux area in North Nashville.

By the 2000s, residents attempted to "revitalize" the Jefferson Street community. In 2017, it was decided that the music history of Jefferson Street would be chronicled in the National Museum of African American Music due to open in 2019. The museum will be located on 5th and Broadway, near the Country Music Hall of Fame and Museum, far from Jefferson Street.

In March 2017, the Muslim American Cultural Center, a new mosque, opened on the street.

In May 2019, media coverage suggested African-American property owners were being pressured into selling their buildings to developers, who reported them for coding violations if they refused to sell.
