= Ronald Lee Gilman =

American judge (born 1942)

Ronald Gilman
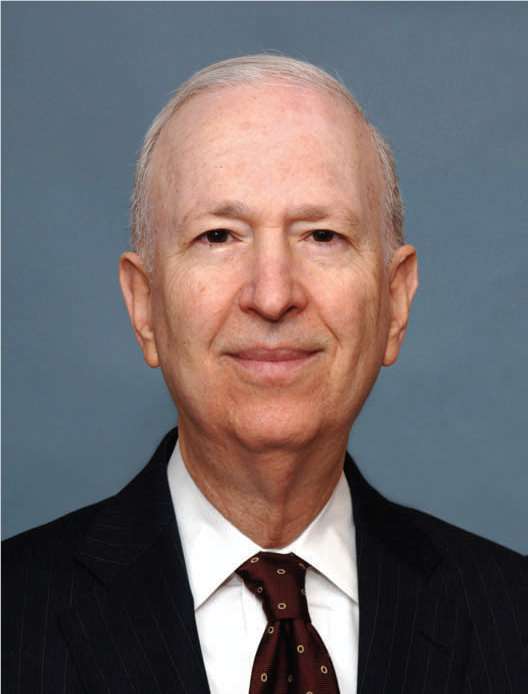

Senior Judge of the United States Court of Appeals for the Sixth Circuit
- Incumbent
- Assumed office November 21, 2010

Judge of the United States Court of Appeals for the Sixth Circuit
- In office November 7, 1997 – November 21, 2010
- Appointed by: Bill Clinton
- Preceded by: Herbert Theodore Milburn
- Succeeded by: Bernice B. Donald

Personal details
- Born: Ronald Lee Gilman; October 16, 1942 (age 82); Memphis, Tennessee, U.S.
- Education: Massachusetts Institute of Technology (BS); Harvard University (JD)

Ronald Lee Gilman (born October 16, 1942 in Memphis, Tennessee) is a Senior United States circuit judge of the United States Court of Appeals for the Sixth Circuit.

== Education and career ==
Gilman attended the Massachusetts Institute of Technology in 1964 and received a Scientiae Baccalaureus degree in Economics. In 1967, he obtained a Juris Doctor from Harvard Law School. Gilman privately practiced law in Memphis and became a professor at the University of Memphis School of Law in 1980. In 1988 he became an arbitrator and mediator at the American Arbitration Association. In 1993, Gilman became an arbitrator and mediator at the National Association of Securities Dealers. He was a referee at the Private Adjudication Center from 1993 to 1997.

== Federal judicial service ==
Gilman was nominated to the United States Court of Appeals for the Sixth Circuit by President Bill Clinton on July 16, 1997 after the seat had been vacated by Judge Herbert Theodore Milburn. On November 6, 1997, Gilman was confirmed by the United States Senate by a 98-1 vote, with Senator Lauch Faircloth being the lone senator voting against him. He received his commission on November 7, 1997. He assumed senior status on November 21, 2010.

== Notable cases ==
In ACLU v. NSA, the Court of Appeals for the Sixth Circuit decided to vacate the District Court's decision that the extrajudicial electronic intercepts of the National Security Agency, where one party is within the U.S. and the other is outside, violated the law. The Court decided that the plaintiffs lacked standing. Judge Ronald Gilman wrote a long dissent, in which he argued that the plaintiffs did have standing, and that the Terrorist Surveillance Program as originally implemented violated the FISA.

Appeals judges Ronald Gilman, Gilbert Merritt, and Alan Eugene Norris unanimously reversed the decision of United States District Judge Thomas B. Russell, who had ruled in August 1997 against Jefferson County officials, therefore allowing county fiscal judges to regulate adult businesses.

== Sources ==
Legal offices
Preceded by Herbert Theodore Milburn	Judge of the United States Court of Appeals for the Sixth Circuit; 1997–2010	Succeeded by Bernice B. Donald
