= National Museum of African American Music =

American museum

Coordinates: 36.16064°N 86.77893°W

- Established: 2019
- Location: Fifth + Broadway, Nashville, Tennessee
- Executive director: William E. Jeffries
- Curator: Dr. Bryan Pierce
- Employees: 30-40
- Website: https://www.nmaam.org/

The National Museum of African American Music (NMAAM) is a museum in Nashville, Tennessee. The museum showcases the musical genres inspired, created, or influenced by African-Americans. Its location at Fifth + Broadway in Downtown Nashville, as opposed to historically-Black Jefferson Street, has been controversial.

== Collection ==
The museum was said to eventually comprise "five permanent themed galleries" as well as "a 200-seat theater and traveling exhibits". Its founding curator, Dr. Dina Bennett, was appointed in May 2018.

The museum showcases more than fifty musical genres that were inspired, created, or influenced by African American culture, ranging from early American religious music to hip-hop and Rhythm and Blues.

Its collection will include up to 1,400 artifacts, including clothes worn by Nat King Cole, Dorothy Dandridge, Whitney Houston, and Lisa Lopes. The first traveling exhibit is expected to be about the Fisk Jubilee Singers.

== History ==
The museum was proposed by members of the Nashville Area Chamber of Commerce in 2002 with the vision to preserve and celebrate African American music, art and culture. After a task force met and conducted research to determine if the project was feasible, the project shifted over the course of ten years to focus on music exclusively. NMAAM's mission is preserving African American music traditions and celebrating the central role African Americans have played in shaping American music.

The museum received $500,000 from the Regions Foundation and $500,000 from the Mike Curb Foundation in February 2019.

In 2015, the City of Nashville announced that NMAAM would be located at the old convention center site.

=== Location controversy ===
The museum was initially supposed to be built at the intersection of Rosa Parks Boulevard and Jefferson Street, the historic center of the city's African-American community. In 2015, the City of Nashville announced that NMAAM would be located at the old convention center site. The staff of the Tennessee Tribune, Nashville's African-American newspaper, explained:

This very city government once destroyed all of the African American Business on Jefferson Street where there was loss of income, businesses, homes and the city turned its back. The city now wants to dictate to the African American Community where it wants the Museum and once again treat African Americans who elected them to office as 2nd class citizens with no rights or input for a project that is the African American Community project. It is the most racist effort this city has had for the last 20 years.

— Tribune Staff, The Tennessee Tribune (November 18, 2016)

The museum is located at Fifth + Broadway in Downtown Nashville, where the Nashville Convention Center once stood. The new complex, which was expected to cost $450 million, was developed by OliverMcMillan and Spectrum | Emery, a company owned by businessman Pat Emery.

The new location, close to Broadway and the Ryman Auditorium, was praised by Senator Marsha Blackburn at a fundraising event in February 2019. Mayor David Briley added, "For Nashville to get past its history of racism and to start to move to an era where African-Americans both know and can tell their own history in our city, we have to invest in this museum."

=== Grand Opening ===
The National Museum of African American Music broke ground in April 2017. The grand opening was January 18, 2021.
