= Thomas Gray Hull =

American judge (1926–2008)

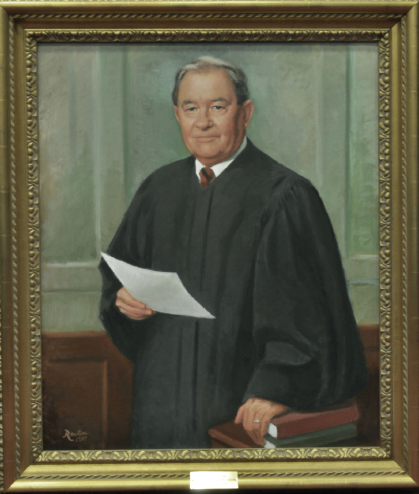

Senior Judge of the United States District Court for the Eastern District of Tennessee
- In office October 1, 2002 – July 29, 2008

Chief Judge of the United States District Court for the Eastern District of Tennessee
- In office 1984–1991
- Preceded by: Herbert Theodore Milburn
- Succeeded by: James Howard Jarvis II

Judge of the United States District Court for the Eastern District of Tennessee
- In office November 14, 1983 – October 1, 2002
- Appointed by: Ronald Reagan
- Preceded by: Frank Wiley Wilson
- Succeeded by: J. Ronnie Greer

Personal details
- Born: Thomas Gray Hull; May 20, 1926 Greeneville, Tennessee
- Died: July 29, 2008 (aged 82) Greeneville, Tennessee
- Education: Tusculum College; University of Tennessee College of Law (J.D.)

Thomas Gray Hull (May 20, 1926 – July 29, 2008) was a United States district judge of the United States District Court for the Eastern District of Tennessee.

== Education and career ==
Born in Greeneville, Tennessee, Hull was a Corporal in the United States Army during World War II, from 1944 to 1946. Hull was a member of the Asbury United Methodist Church in Greeneville from 1940 and a member of the American Legion and Veterans of Foreign Wars from 1946. He went to Tusculum College and then received a Juris Doctor from the University of Tennessee College of Law in 1951. He was in private practice in Greeneville from 1951 to 1972. He was a member of the Tennessee House of Representatives from 1955 to 1965. He was the chief clerk of the Tennessee House of Representatives from 1969 to 1970. He was a judge of the 20th Judicial Circuit of Tennessee from 1972 to 1979. In 1979, he and his brother-in-law Carl Brandon bought controlling interest of a bank in Greeneville, now known as Andrew Johnson Bank. He also was instrumental in the formation of Greeneville Federal Bank, where his son serves as president. He was a legal counsel to Governor Lamar Alexander of Tennessee from 1979 to 1981. He was in private practice in Greeneville from 1981 to 1982.

== Federal judicial service ==
Hull was nominated by President Ronald Reagan on October 24, 1983, to a seat on the United States District Court for the Eastern District of Tennessee vacated by Judge Frank Wiley Wilson. He was confirmed by the United States Senate on November 9, 1983, and received his commission on November 14, 1983. He served as Chief Judge from 1984 to 1991. He assumed senior status on October 1, 2002. Hull served in that capacity until July 29, 2008, due to an extended illness which led to his death, in Greeneville.

== Sources ==
Legal offices
Preceded by Frank Wiley Wilson	Judge of the United States District Court for the Eastern District of Tennessee; 1983–2002	Succeeded by J. Ronnie Greer
Preceded by Herbert Theodore Milburn	Chief Judge of the United States District Court for the Eastern District of Tennessee; 1984–1991	Succeeded by James Howard Jarvis II
