= Leslie Rogers Darr =

American judge (1886–1967)

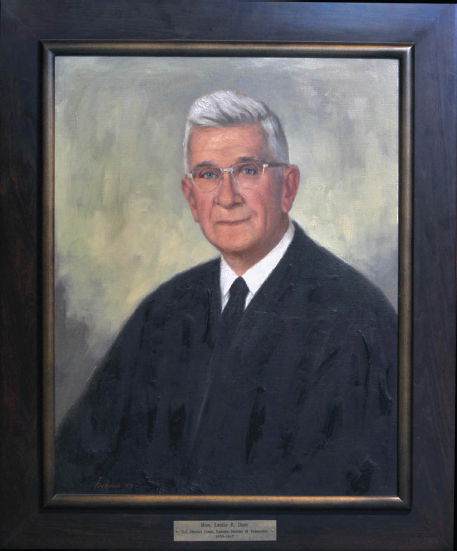

Senior Judge of the United States District Court for the Eastern District of Tennessee
- In office March 15, 1961 – May 29, 1967

Chief Judge of the United States District Court for the Eastern District of Tennessee
- In office 1949–1961
- Preceded by: George Caldwell Taylor
- Succeeded by: Robert Love Taylor

Judge of the United States District Court for the Eastern District of Tennessee
- In office June 2, 1939 – March 15, 1961
- Appointed by: Franklin D. Roosevelt
- Preceded by: Seat established by 52 Stat. 584
- Succeeded by: Frank Wiley Wilson

Judge of the United States District Court for the Middle District of Tennessee
- In office June 2, 1939 – November 27, 1940
- Appointed by: Franklin D. Roosevelt
- Preceded by: Seat established by 52 Stat. 584
- Succeeded by: Seat abolished

Personal details
- Born: Leslie Rogers Darr; November 8, 1886 Jasper, Tennessee
- Died: May 29, 1967 (aged 80)
- Education: Cumberland School of Law (LL.B.)

Leslie Rogers Darr (November 8, 1886 – May 29, 1967) was a United States district judge of the United States District Court for the Eastern District of Tennessee and the United States District Court for the Middle District of Tennessee.

== Education and career ==
Born in Jasper, Tennessee, Darr received a Bachelor of Laws from the Cumberland School of Law (then part of Cumberland University, now part of Samford University) in 1909. He was in private practice in Jasper from 1910 to 1926. He was a judge of the 18th Circuit Court of Tennessee from 1926 to 1939.

== Federal judicial service ==
Darr was nominated by President Franklin D. Roosevelt on May 24, 1939, to the United States District Court for the Eastern District of Tennessee and the United States District Court for the Middle District of Tennessee, to a new joint seat authorized by 52 Stat. 584. He was confirmed by the United States Senate on May 31, 1939, and received his commission on June 2, 1939. He was reassigned by operation of law to serve only in the Eastern District on November 27, 1940. He served as Chief Judge from 1949 to 1961. He assumed senior status on March 15, 1961. His service terminated on May 29, 1967, due to his death.

== Sources ==
Legal offices
| Preceded by Seat established by 52 Stat. 584 | Judge of the United States District Court for the Eastern District of Tennessee; 1939–1961 | Succeeded by Frank Wiley Wilson |
| Preceded by Seat established by 52 Stat. 584 | Judge of the United States District Court for the Middle District of Tennessee; 1939–1940 | Succeeded by Seat abolished |
| Preceded by George Caldwell Taylor | Chief Judge of the United States District Court for the Eastern District of Tennessee; 1949–1961 | Succeeded by Robert Love Taylor |
