= George Caldwell Taylor =

American judge (1885–1952)

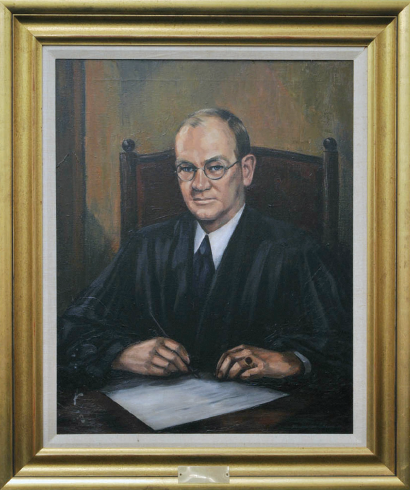

Senior Judge of the United States District Court for the Eastern District of Tennessee
- In office November 2, 1949 – December 19, 1952

Chief Judge of the United States District Court for the Eastern District of Tennessee
- In office 1948–1949
- Preceded by: Office established
- Succeeded by: Leslie Rogers Darr

Judge of the United States District Court for the Eastern District of Tennessee
- In office May 26, 1928 – November 2, 1949
- Appointed by: Calvin Coolidge
- Preceded by: Xenophon Hicks
- Succeeded by: Robert Love Taylor

Personal details
- Born: George Caldwell Taylor; December 29, 1885 Greeneville, Tennessee
- Died: December 19, 1952 (aged 66)
- Education: Tusculum College (A.B.); University of Tennessee College of Law (LL.B.)

George Caldwell Taylor (May 29, 1885 – December 19, 1952) was a United States district judge of the United States District Court for the Eastern District of Tennessee.

== Education and career ==
Born in Greeneville, Tennessee, Taylor received an Artium Baccalaureus degree from Tusculum College in 1906 and a Bachelor of Laws from the University of Tennessee College of Law in 1908. He was in private practice in Rockwood, Tennessee from 1908 to 1911. He was Secretary to the Governor of Tennessee from 1911 to 1913, thereafter returning to his private practice in Greeneville until 1921. He was the United States Attorney for the Eastern District of Tennessee from 1921 to 1928.

== Federal judicial service ==
Taylor was nominated by President Calvin Coolidge on May 24, 1928, to a seat on the United States District Court for the Eastern District of Tennessee vacated by Judge Xenophon Hicks. He was confirmed by the United States Senate on May 26, 1928, and received his commission the same day. He served as Chief Judge from 1948 to 1949. He assumed senior status due to a certified disability on November 2, 1949. His service terminated on December 19, 1952, due to his death.

== Sources ==
Legal offices
| Preceded by Xenophon Hicks | Judge of the United States District Court for the Eastern District of Tennessee; 1928–1949 | Succeeded by Robert Love Taylor |
| Preceded by Office established | Chief Judge of the United States District Court for the Eastern District of Tennessee; 1948–1949 | Succeeded by Leslie Rogers Darr |
