= John J. Gore =

American judge

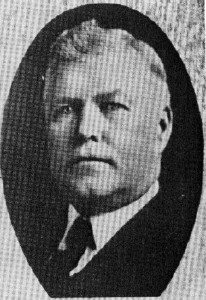

Judge of the United States District Court for the Middle District of Tennessee
- In office March 2, 1923 – February 21, 1939
- Appointed by: Warren G. Harding
- Preceded by: Seat established by 42 Stat. 837
- Succeeded by: Elmer David Davies

Personal details
- Born: John Jordan Gore; April 28, 1878 Gainesboro, Tennessee
- Died: February 21, 1939 (aged 60) Nashville, Tennessee
- Resting place: Gainesboro, Tennessee
- Party: Republican
- Education: read law

John Jordan Gore (April 28, 1878 – February 21, 1939) was a United States district judge of the United States District Court for the Middle District of Tennessee.

== Education and career ==
Born on April 28, 1878, in Gainesboro, Tennessee, Gore received his education at Montpelier Academy in Gainesboro, Bellwood Academy in Macon County and Fall's Business School in Nashville, Tennessee. He read law in the office of Judge Bancroft Murray in Gainesboro in 1899. He entered private practice in partnership with Cordell Hull in Jackson, Tennessee in 1899, the law firm named Hull & Gore, despite the fact that Hull was a Democratic and Gore was a Republican. During the administration of President Theodore Roosevelt, Gore was Postmaster of Gainesboro and Collector of Customs for the Port of Nashville, both federal patronage positions. He was a member of the Tennessee Senate from 1915 to 1916. Gore was Chairman of the Republican Executive Committee for the State of Tennessee in 1920.

== Federal judicial service ==
Gore was nominated by President Warren G. Harding on February 28, 1923, to the United States District Court for the Middle District of Tennessee, to a new seat authorized by 42 Stat. 837. He was confirmed by the United States Senate on March 2, 1923, and received his commission the same day. His service terminated on February 21, 1939, due to his death of heart failure at his residence at the Hermitage Hotel in Nashville. He was interred two days later at the cemetery at his family's farm in Gainesboro. Gore never married.

== Family ==
Gore was related to the Gore political family of Tennessee, whose most noted member is former Vice President Al Gore.

== Sources ==
- "John Jordan Gore (1878–1939)". United States Court of Appeals for the Sixth Circuit. Archived from the original on 2009-05-13.
- Time Magazine, Milestones Section, March 6, 1939

Legal offices
Preceded by Seat established by 42 Stat. 837	Judge of the United States District Court for the Middle District of Tennessee; 1923–1939	Succeeded by Elmer David Davies
