= William Joseph Haynes Jr. =

American judge

Senior Judge of the United States District Court for the Middle District of Tennessee
- In office December 1, 2014 – January 16, 2017

Chief Judge of the United States District Court for the Middle District of Tennessee
- In office 2012–2014
- Preceded by: Todd J. Campbell
- Succeeded by: Kevin H. Sharp

Judge of the United States District Court for the Middle District of Tennessee
- In office November 15, 1999 – December 1, 2014
- Appointed by: Bill Clinton
- Preceded by: Thomas Aquinas Higgins
- Succeeded by: Waverly D. Crenshaw Jr.

Magistrate Judge of the United States District Court for the Middle District of Tennessee
- In office 1984–1999

Personal details
- Born: September 5, 1949 (age 76) Memphis, Tennessee, U.S.
- Education: College of St. Thomas (BA); Vanderbilt University School of Law (JD)

William Joseph Haynes Jr. (born September 5, 1949) is a former United States district judge of the United States District Court for the Middle District of Tennessee.

== Early life and education ==
Born in Memphis, Tennessee, Haynes received a Bachelor of Arts degree from College of St. Thomas in 1970 and a Juris Doctor from Vanderbilt University School of Law in 1973.

== Professional career ==
Haynes worked in the Tennessee Attorney General's Office from 1973 to 1984, as an assistant state attorney general from 1973 to 1977, then as a senior state assistant general from 1977 to 1978, and finally as a deputy state attorney general from 1978 to 1984. He was in private practice in Nashville, Tennessee in 1984. He was an adjunct professor, Southeastern Paralegal Institute from 1986 to 1990. He was an adjunct professor, Vanderbilt University School of Law from 1987 to 1994 and from 1997 to 1998.

== Federal judicial service ==
From 1984 until 1999, Haynes served as a United States magistrate judge for the United States District Court for the Middle District of Tennessee. On May 27, 1999, President Bill Clinton nominated Haynes to be a United States District Judge of the United States District Court for the Middle District of Tennessee, to a seat vacated by Thomas A. Higgins. He was confirmed by the United States Senate on November 10, 1999, and received his commission on November 15, 1999. He served as Chief Judge from 2012 to 2014. He assumed senior status on December 1, 2014. He retired from active service on January 16, 2017.

== See also ==
- List of African-American federal judges
- List of African-American jurists
- List of first minority male lawyers and judges in Tennessee

== Sources ==
Legal offices
| Preceded by Thomas Aquinas Higgins | Judge of the United States District Court for the Middle District of Tennessee; 1999–2014 | Succeeded by Waverly D. Crenshaw Jr. |
| Preceded by Todd J. Campbell | Chief Judge of the United States District Court for the Middle District of Tennessee; 2012–2014 | Succeeded by Kevin H. Sharp |
