= Herbert Theodore Milburn =

American judge (1931–2016)

Herbert Milburn

Senior Judge of the United States Court of Appeals for the Sixth Circuit
- In office July 1, 1996 – April 1, 2016

Judge of the United States Court of Appeals for the Sixth Circuit
- In office October 4, 1984 – July 1, 1996
- Appointed by: Ronald Reagan
- Preceded by: Seat established by 98 Stat. 333
- Succeeded by: Ronald Lee Gilman

Chief Judge of the United States District Court for the Eastern District of Tennessee
- In office January 15, 1984 – October 9, 1984
- Preceded by: Frank Wiley Wilson
- Succeeded by: Thomas Gray Hull

Judge of the United States District Court for the Eastern District of Tennessee
- In office June 7, 1983 – October 9, 1984
- Appointed by: Ronald Reagan
- Preceded by: Charles Gelbert Neese
- Succeeded by: Robert Allan Edgar

Personal details
- Born: Herbert Theodore Milburn; May 26, 1931 Cleveland, Tennessee
- Died: April 1, 2016 (aged 84) Signal Mountain, Tennessee
- Education: East Tennessee State University (BS); University of Tennessee College of Law (JD)

Herbert Theodore Milburn or H. Ted Milburn (May 26, 1931 – April 1, 2016) was a United States district judge of the United States District Court for the Eastern District of Tennessee and later a United States Circuit Judge of the United States Court of Appeals for the Sixth Circuit.

== Education and career ==
Born in Cleveland, Tennessee, Milburn graduated from Chattanooga City High School in 1949. He attended University of Tennessee at Chattanooga and Boston University before receiving a Bachelor of Science degree in education from East Tennessee State University in 1953. He was in the United States Army for three years from 1953 to 1956 with the Signal Corps at Camp Gordon, Georgia and the Security agency. He received a Juris Doctor from the University of Tennessee College of Law in 1959, and was in private practice in Chattanooga, Tennessee from then until 1973. He was a judge on the Circuit Court of Hamilton County, Tennessee, Division III from 1973 to 1983.

== Federal judicial service ==
Milburn was nominated by President Ronald Reagan on April 14, 1983, to a seat on the United States District Court for the Eastern District of Tennessee vacated by Judge Charles Gelbert Neese. He was confirmed by the United States Senate on June 6, 1983, and received commission on June 7, 1983. He served as Chief Judge from January 15, 1984 to October 9, 1984. His service terminated on October 9, 1984, due to elevation to the court of appeals.

Milburn was nominated by President Reagan on September 6, 1984, to the United States Court of Appeals for the Sixth Circuit, to a new seat authorized by 98 Stat. 333. He was confirmed by the Senate on October 3, 1984, and received commission on October 4, 1984. He assumed senior status due to a certified disability on July 1, 1996. His service terminated on April 1, 2016, due to death.

== Death ==
Milburn died on April 1, 2016, at the Alexian Village Retirement Community, in Signal Mountain, Tennessee.

== Sources ==
Legal offices
Preceded by Charles Gelbert Neese	Judge of the United States District Court for the Eastern District of Tennessee; 1983–1984	Succeeded by Robert Allan Edgar
Preceded by Frank Wiley Wilson	Chief Judge of the United States District Court for the Eastern District of Tennessee; 1984	Succeeded by Thomas Gray Hull
Preceded by Seat established by 98 Stat. 333	Judge of the United States Court of Appeals for the Sixth Circuit; 1984–1996	Succeeded by Ronald Lee Gilman
