= Waverly D. Crenshaw Jr. =

American judge (born 1956)

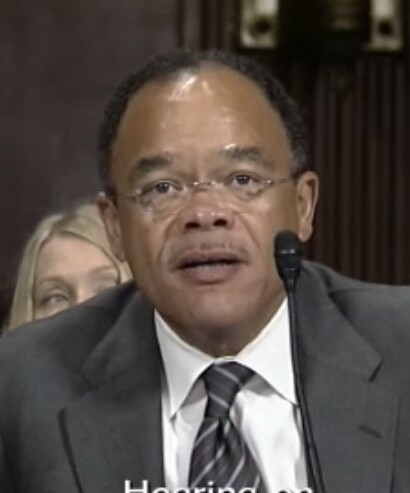
- Crenshaw in 2015

Chief Judge of the United States District Court for the Middle District of Tennessee
- In office April 15, 2017 – April 15, 2024
- Preceded by: Kevin H. Sharp
- Succeeded by: William L. Campbell Jr.

Judge of the United States District Court for the Middle District of Tennessee
- Incumbent
- Assumed office April 12, 2016
- Appointed by: Barack Obama
- Preceded by: William Joseph Haynes Jr.

Personal details
- Born: Waverly David Crenshaw Jr. December 17, 1956 (age 69) Nashville, Tennessee, U.S.
- Education: Vanderbilt University (BA, JD)

Waverly David Crenshaw Jr. (born December 17, 1956) is a United States federal judge of the United States District Court for the Middle District of Tennessee.

== Biography ==
Crenshaw was born on December 17, 1956, in Nashville, Tennessee. Crenshaw received a Bachelor of Arts degree in 1978 from Vanderbilt University. He received a Juris Doctor in 1981 from Vanderbilt University Law School. From 1981 to 1982, he served as a law clerk to the Judges of the Chancery and Probate Court of Davidson County, Tennessee. From 1982 to 1984, he served as a law clerk to Judge John Trice Nixon of the United States District Court for the Middle District of Tennessee. He served as assistant attorney general of the State of Tennessee from 1984 to 1987. From 1987 to 1990, he was an associate at the law firm of Passino, Delaney & Hildebrand. He joined the law firm of Waller Lansden Dortch & Davis, LLP in 1990 as an associate, becoming partner in 1994; becoming the first African-American attorney and partner at the firm. He specialized in labor and employment law.

=== Federal judicial service ===
On February 4, 2015, President Barack Obama nominated Crenshaw to serve as a United States district judge of the United States District Court for the Middle District of Tennessee, to the seat vacated by Judge William Joseph Haynes Jr., who assumed senior status on December 1, 2014. He received a hearing before the Senate Judiciary Committee on June 10, 2015. On July 9, 2015, his nomination was reported out of committee by a voice vote. On April 11, 2016, the Senate confirmed his nomination by a 92–0 vote. He received his commission on April 12, 2016. At the time of his confirmation, Crenshaw was only the second African-American federal judge on active status in Tennessee. He became chief judge on April 15, 2017, after Kevin H. Sharp resigned, completing a seven-year-term on April 15, 2024.

== Personal life ==
Crenshaw was the first African American to become a member of the Belle Meade Country Club, a private golf club in Belle Meade, Tennessee, in 2012.

== See also ==
- List of African-American federal judges
- List of African-American jurists

== Sources ==
- Waverly D. Crenshaw Jr. at Ballotpedia

Legal offices
Preceded by William Joseph Haynes Jr.	Judge of the United States District Court for the Middle District of Tennessee; 2016–present	Incumbent
Preceded by Kevin H. Sharp	Chief Judge of the United States District Court for the Middle District of Tennessee; 2017–2024	Succeeded by William L. Campbell Jr.
