= Thomas A. Wiseman Jr. =

American judge (1930–2020)

Senior Judge of the United States District Court for the Middle District of Tennessee
- In office November 3, 1995 – March 18, 2020

Chief Judge of the United States District Court for the Middle District of Tennessee
- In office 1984–1991
- Preceded by: Leland Clure Morton
- Succeeded by: John Trice Nixon

Judge of the United States District Court for the Middle District of Tennessee
- In office August 11, 1978 – November 3, 1995
- Appointed by: Jimmy Carter
- Preceded by: Frank Gray Jr.
- Succeeded by: Todd J. Campbell

37th Tennessee State Treasurer
- In office 1971–1974
- Governor: Winfield Dunn
- Preceded by: Charlie Worley
- Succeeded by: Harlan Mathews

Member of the Tennessee House of Representatives
- In office 1964–1968

Personal details
- Born: Thomas Anderton Wiseman Jr. November 3, 1930 Tullahoma, Tennessee
- Died: March 18, 2020 (aged 89) Nashville, Tennessee
- Party: Democratic
- Spouse: Emily Matlack Wiseman (m. 1957)
- Children: 3
- Education: Vanderbilt University (BA); Vanderbilt University Law School (JD); University of Virginia School of Law (LLM)

Thomas Anderton Wiseman Jr. (November 3, 1930 – March 18, 2020) was a United States district judge of the United States District Court for the Middle District of Tennessee from 1978 to 1995.

== Education and career ==
Born in Tullahoma, Tennessee, the son of Vera Seleta (Poe) and Thomas Anderton Wiseman, Wiseman graduated from Tullahoma High School. He then received a Bachelor of Arts degree from Vanderbilt University in 1952, and a Juris Doctor from Vanderbilt University Law School in 1954. He passed the bar in 1954. He was in the United States Army for two years from 1954 to 1956. He then entered private practice in Tullahoma from 1956 to 1963, and in Winchester, Tennessee from 1963 to 1971.

He was a member of the Tennessee House of Representatives from 1965 to 1969, and was the Treasurer of the State of Tennessee from 1971 to 1974. He ran for the Democratic Party nomination for Governor in 1974 amid a crowded field of candidates and was badly outspent by both eventual nominee and winner Ray Blanton and runner-up Jake Butcher. Wiseman then resumed his private practice, this time in Nashville, Tennessee from 1974 to 1978.

== Federal judicial service ==
On August 1, 1978, Wiseman was nominated by President Jimmy Carter to a seat on the United States District Court for the Middle District of Tennessee vacated by Judge Frank Gray Jr. Wiseman was confirmed by the United States Senate on August 11, 1978, and received his commission the same day. He served as Chief Judge from 1984 to 1991, and assumed senior status on November 3, 1995. At the time of his death, he was in inactive senior status.

== Further education and service ==
Wiseman served as an adjunct faculty member at Vanderbilt University Law School from 1989–2020, and received a Master of Laws from the University of Virginia School of Law in 1990. He was a Special Master for the Sixth Circuit Court of Appeals from 1992–1993.

== Death ==
He died on March 18, 2020, in Nashville, Tennessee at age 89.

== Sources ==
Legal offices
Preceded by Frank Gray Jr.	Judge of the United States District Court for the Middle District of Tennessee; 1978–1995	Succeeded by Todd J. Campbell
Preceded by Leland Clure Morton	Chief Judge of the United States District Court for the Middle District of Tennessee; 1984–1991	Succeeded by John Trice Nixon
