= Thomas Aquinas Higgins =

American judge

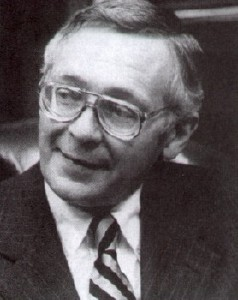

Senior Judge of the United States District Court for the Middle District of Tennessee
- In office February 28, 1999 – September 11, 2018

Judge of the United States District Court for the Middle District of Tennessee
- In office October 4, 1984 – February 28, 1999
- Appointed by: Ronald Reagan
- Preceded by: Leland Clure Morton
- Succeeded by: William Joseph Haynes Jr.

Personal details
- Born: August 15, 1932 Nashville, Tennessee, U.S.
- Died: September 11, 2018 (aged 86) Nashville, Tennessee, U.S.
- Education: Christian Brothers College (A.A.); University of Tennessee (B.A.); Vanderbilt University Law School (LL.B.)

Thomas Aquinas Higgins (August 15, 1932 – September 11, 2018) was an American jurist who was United States district judge of the United States District Court for the Middle District of Tennessee.

== Education and career ==
He was born in Nashville, Tennessee and attended Father Ryan High School. He received an Associate of Arts degree from Christian Brothers College in 1952 and a Bachelor of Arts degree from the University of Tennessee in 1954. He received a Bachelor of Laws from Vanderbilt University Law School in 1957. He was in the United States Army Judge Advocate General's Corps from 1957 to 1960, where he attained the rank of first lieutenant. He was in private practice in Nashville from 1961 to 1984.

== Federal judicial service ==
Higgins was nominated by President Ronald Reagan on September 6, 1984, to a seat on the United States District Court for the Middle District of Tennessee vacated by Judge Leland Clure Morton. He was confirmed by the United States Senate on October 3, 1984, and received his commission on October 4, 1984. He assumed senior status on February 28, 1999. He retired into inactive senior status in 2006, meaning that while he remained a federal judge, he no longer heard cases or participated in the business of the court. He died on September 11, 2018, in Nashville.

== Sources ==
Legal offices
Preceded by Leland Clure Morton	Judge of the United States District Court for the Middle District of Tennessee; 1984–1999	Succeeded by William Joseph Haynes Jr.
