= Charles Gelbert Neese =

American judge

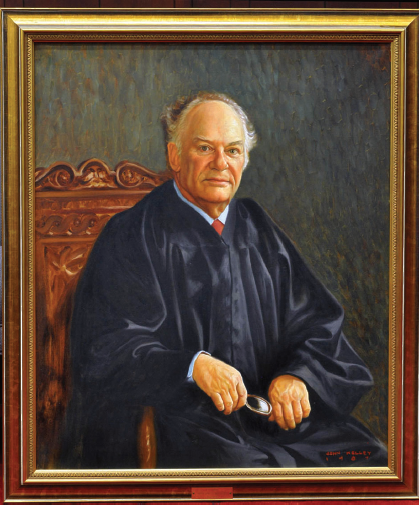

Senior Judge of the United States District Court for the Eastern District of Tennessee
- In office August 31, 1982 – October 22, 1989

Judge of the United States District Court for the Eastern District of Tennessee
- In office November 20, 1961 – August 31, 1982
- Appointed by: John F. Kennedy
- Preceded by: Seat established by 75 Stat. 80
- Succeeded by: Herbert Theodore Milburn

Personal details
- Born: Charles Gelbert Neese; October 3, 1916 Paris, Tennessee
- Died: October 22, 1989 (aged 73) Nashville, Tennessee
- Education: Cumberland School of Law (LL.B.) read law

Charles Gelbert Neese (October 3, 1916 – October 22, 1989) was a United States district judge of the United States District Court for the Eastern District of Tennessee.

== Education and career ==
Born in Paris, Tennessee, Neese received a Bachelor of Laws from Cumberland School of Law in 1936, but read law to enter the bar in 1938. He entered private practice of law in Paris from 1938 to 1941. He was field secretary for United States Representative Herron C. Pearson from Tennessee from 1940 to 1941. He was executive assistant and general counsel to the Governor of Tennessee for unemployment compensation appeals and traffic and transportation from 1941 to 1944. He was a United States Naval Reserve Commander in 1945. He was in private practice in Paris from 1945 to 1946. He was public relations representative for the Tennessee-Kentucky Chain Store Councils in Paris from 1946 to 1947. He was campaign manager for Estes Kefauver for United States Senate in 1948, and in 1954. He was in private practice in Paris from 1948 to 1949. He was administrative assistant for United States Senator Estes Kefauver from 1949 to 1951. He was in private practice in Paris from 1951 to 1952. He was a political consultant in Paris in 1952. He was in private practice of law in Nashville, Tennessee from 1952 to 1961.

== Federal judicial service ==
Neese received a recess appointment from President John F. Kennedy on November 20, 1961, to the United States District Court for the Eastern District of Tennessee, to a new seat created by 75 Stat. 80. He was nominated to the same seat by President Kennedy on January 15, 1962. He was confirmed by the United States Senate on February 7, 1962, and received his commission on February 17, 1962. He assumed senior status on August 31, 1982. His service was terminated on October 22, 1989, due to his death in Nashville.

== Sources ==
Legal offices
| Preceded by Seat established by 75 Stat. 80 | Judge of the United States District Court for the Eastern District of Tennessee; 1961–1982 | Succeeded by Herbert Theodore Milburn |
