= Xenophon Hicks =

American judge (1872–1952)

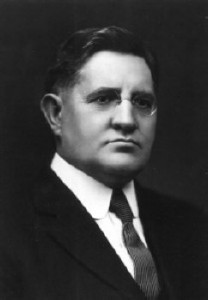

Senior Judge of the United States Court of Appeals for the Sixth Circuit
- In office March 1, 1952 – November 2, 1952

Chief Judge of the United States Court of Appeals for the Sixth Circuit
- In office 1948–1952
- Preceded by: Office established
- Succeeded by: Charles Casper Simons

Judge of the United States Court of Appeals for the Sixth Circuit
- In office May 23, 1928 – March 1, 1952
- Appointed by: Calvin Coolidge
- Preceded by: Seat established by 45 Stat. 492
- Succeeded by: Potter Stewart

Judge of the United States District Court for the Eastern District of Tennessee
- In office March 2, 1923 – May 23, 1928
- Appointed by: Warren G. Harding
- Preceded by: Edward Terry Sanford
- Succeeded by: George Caldwell Taylor

Judge of the United States District Court for the Middle District of Tennessee
- In office March 2, 1923 – May 23, 1928
- Appointed by: Warren G. Harding
- Preceded by: Edward Terry Sanford
- Succeeded by: Seat abolished

Personal details
- Born: Xenophon Hicks; May 2, 1872 Clinton, Tennessee
- Died: November 2, 1952 (aged 80)
- Education: Tennessee Wesleyan University (AB); Cumberland School of Law (LLB)

Xenophon Hicks (May 2, 1872 – November 2, 1952) was a United States circuit judge of the United States Court of Appeals for the Sixth Circuit and previously was a United States district judge of the United States District Court for the Eastern District of Tennessee and the United States District Court for the Middle District of Tennessee.

== Education and career ==
Born in Clinton, Tennessee, Hicks received an Artium Baccalaureus degree from U.S. Grant University (now Tennessee Wesleyan University) in 1891 and a Bachelor of Laws from Cumberland School of Law (then part of Cumberland University, now part of Samford University) in 1892. He was in private practice in Clinton from 1892 to 1898. He was city attorney of Clinton from 1892 to 1893, and county attorney of Anderson County, Tennessee from 1894 to 1896.

He joined the United States Army in 1898 and served in the 6th United States Volunteer Infantry during the Spanish–American War and became a captain.

He later served as an alderman and mayor of Clinton. He became a member of the Tennessee Senate in 1911, and was an assistant state attorney general of the 2nd Judicial Circuit of Tennessee from 1911 to 1913. He was a Judge of the Criminal and Law Court for the 2nd Judicial Circuit of Tennessee from 1913 to 1918, and was a Judge of the 19th Circuit Court of Tennessee from 1918 to 1923.

== Federal judicial service ==
Hicks was nominated by President Warren G. Harding on February 28, 1923, to a joint seat on the United States District Court for the Eastern District of Tennessee and the United States District Court for the Middle District of Tennessee vacated by Judge Edward Terry Sanford. He was confirmed by the United States Senate on March 2, 1923, and received his commission the same day. His service terminated on May 23, 1928, due to his elevation to the Sixth Circuit. Upon the termination of his service, the concurrency with the Middle District ended and his successor served only in the Eastern District.

Hicks was nominated by President Calvin Coolidge on May 19, 1928, to the United States Court of Appeals for the Sixth Circuit, to a new seat authorized by 45 Stat. 492. He was confirmed by the Senate on May 23, 1928, and received his commission the same day. He was a member of the Conference of Senior Circuit Judges (now the Judicial Conference of the United States) from 1938 to 1948, and was a member of the Judicial Conference of the United States from 1948 to 1951. He served as Chief Judge from 1948 to 1952. He assumed senior status on March 1, 1952. His service terminated on November 2, 1952, due to his death.

== Sources ==
Legal offices
| Preceded by Edward Terry Sanford | Judge of the United States District Court for the Eastern District of Tennessee; 1923–1928 | Succeeded by George Caldwell Taylor |
| Preceded by Edward Terry Sanford | Judge of the United States District Court for the Middle District of Tennessee; 1923–1928 | Succeeded by Seat abolished |
| Preceded by Seat established by 45 Stat. 492 | Judge of the United States Court of Appeals for the Sixth Circuit; 1928–1952 | Succeeded by Potter Stewart |
| Preceded by Office established | Chief Judge of the United States Court of Appeals for the Sixth Circuit; 1948–1952 | Succeeded by Charles Casper Simons |
