= Eli J. Richardson =

American judge (born 1967)

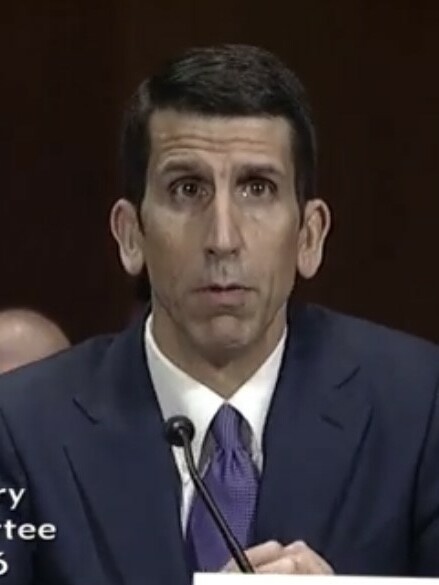

Judge of the United States District Court for the Middle District of Tennessee
- Incumbent
- Assumed office October 18, 2018
- Appointed by: Donald Trump
- Preceded by: Todd J. Campbell

Personal details
- Born: Eli Jeremy Richardson; 1967 (age 57–58) Summit, New Jersey, U.S.
- Education: Duke University (BSE); Vanderbilt University (JD)

Eli Jeremy Richardson (born 1967) is a United States district judge of the United States District Court for the Middle District of Tennessee.

== Biography ==
Richardson received his Bachelor of Engineering from the Duke University and his Juris Doctor from Vanderbilt University Law School, where he served as a member of the Vanderbilt Law Review. He currently serves as an adjunct professor at the Vanderbilt University Law School and previously taught trial advocacy at Belmont University College of Law. Before joining Bass, Berry & Sims, he served for twelve years in the Department of Justice, including four years as a Special Agent in the Federal Bureau of Investigation; seven years as an Assistant United States Attorney for the District of New Jersey and the Middle District of Tennessee; and one year on detail as Resident Legal Advisor to Serbia. Prior to his judicial service, Richardson practiced law both at law firms, such as Bass, Berry & Sims, and in solo practice.

== Federal judicial service ==
On July 13, 2017, President Donald Trump nominated Richardson to serve as a United States District Judge of the United States District Court for the Middle District of Tennessee, to the seat vacated by Judge Todd J. Campbell, who assumed senior status on December 1, 2016. On December 13, 2017, a hearing on his nomination was held before the Senate Judiciary Committee.

On January 3, 2018, his nomination was returned to the President under Rule XXXI, Paragraph 6 of the United States Senate. On January 5, 2018, President Donald Trump announced his intent to renominate Richardson to a federal judgeship. On January 8, 2018, his renomination was sent to the Senate. On January 18, 2018, his nomination was reported out of committee by an 11–10 vote. On October 11, 2018, his nomination was confirmed by a 52–43 vote. He received his judicial commission on October 18, 2018.

== Notable decisions ==
In the 2019 case of Bennett v. Metro. Gov't of Nashville & Davidson Cty., Judge Richardson ruled in favor of a former dispatcher working in the Emergency Communication Center of the city of Nashville, Tennessee who had posted to Facebook a comment reading: "Thank god we have more America loving rednecks. Red spread across all America. Even niggaz and latinos voted for trump too!!" Judge Richardson found that the plaintiff had a free speech right under the First Amendment to make such a post that outweighed any damage to the functioning of the Emergency Communication Center or the public trust in it. In October 2020, Judge Richardson's decision was overturned by unanimous decision of a panel of the United States Court of Appeals for the Sixth Circuit.

On June 28, 2023, in the 2023 case LW v Skremetti, Richardson granted a preliminary statewide injunction against parts of the Tennessee's gender-affirming care ban that outlawed puberty blockers and hormone therapy for transgender youth. Richardson ruled that the plaintiffs lacked standing to challenge the ban on gender-affirming surgeries because none of the plaintiffs were receiving or planning to receive such surgeries and thus upheld the provision. In a 2-1 decision, the Sixth Circuit Court of Appeals granted a stay of the injunction on July 8, 2023. On 24 June 2024, the Supreme Court of the United States, granted certiorari in this case, United States v. Skrmetti.

Legal offices
Preceded by Todd J. Campbell	Judge of the United States District Court for the Middle District of Tennessee; 2018–present	Incumbent
