= William Ernest Miller =

American judge (1908–1976)

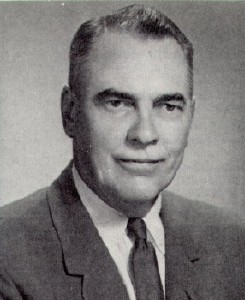

Judge of the United States Court of Appeals for the Sixth Circuit
- In office July 8, 1970 – April 12, 1976
- Appointed by: Richard Nixon
- Preceded by: Clifford Patrick O'Sullivan
- Succeeded by: Gilbert S. Merritt Jr.

Chief Judge of the United States District Court for the Middle District of Tennessee
- In office 1961–1970
- Preceded by: Elmer David Davies
- Succeeded by: Frank Gray Jr.

Judge of the United States District Court for the Middle District of Tennessee
- In office March 16, 1955 – July 13, 1970
- Appointed by: Dwight D. Eisenhower
- Preceded by: Seat established by 68 Stat. 8
- Succeeded by: Leland Clure Morton

Personal details
- Born: February 3, 1908 Johnson City, Tennessee, U.S.
- Died: April 12, 1976 (aged 68)
- Education: University of Tennessee (BA); Yale University (LLB)

William Ernest Miller (February 3, 1908 – April 12, 1976) was a United States circuit judge of the United States Court of Appeals for the Sixth Circuit and previously was a United States district judge of the United States District Court for the Middle District of Tennessee.

== Education and career ==
Born in Johnson City, Tennessee, Miller received an Artium Baccalaureus degree from the University of Tennessee in 1930 and a Bachelor of Laws from Yale Law School in 1933. He was in private practice in Johnson City from 1933 to 1955. He was a state court chancellor of the First Chancery Division of Tennessee from 1939 to 1940. He was in the United States Army Air Corps as a Major from 1942 to 1945.

== Federal judicial service ==
Miller was nominated by President Dwight D. Eisenhower on January 10, 1955, to the United States District Court for the Middle District of Tennessee, to a new seat created by 68 Stat. 8. He was confirmed by the United States Senate on March 14, 1955, and received his commission on March 16, 1955. He served as Chief Judge from 1961 to 1970. His service terminated on July 13, 1970, due to his elevation to the Sixth Circuit.

Miller was nominated by President Richard Nixon on March 3, 1970, to a seat on the United States Court of Appeals for the Sixth Circuit vacated by Judge Clifford Patrick O'Sullivan. He was confirmed by the Senate on June 26, 1970, and received his commission on July 8, 1970. Miller served in that capacity until his death on April 12, 1976.

== Sources ==
Legal offices
Preceded by Seat established by 68 Stat. 8	Judge of the United States District Court for the Middle District of Tennessee; 1955–1970	Succeeded by Leland Clure Morton
Preceded by Elmer David Davies	Chief Judge of the United States District Court for the Middle District of Tennessee; 1961–1970	Succeeded by Frank Gray Jr.
Preceded by Clifford Patrick O'Sullivan	Judge of the United States Court of Appeals for the Sixth Circuit; 1970–1976	Succeeded by Gilbert S. Merritt Jr.
