= Estes Kefauver Federal Building and United States Courthouse =

- Federal Office Building
- U.S. National Register of Historic Places
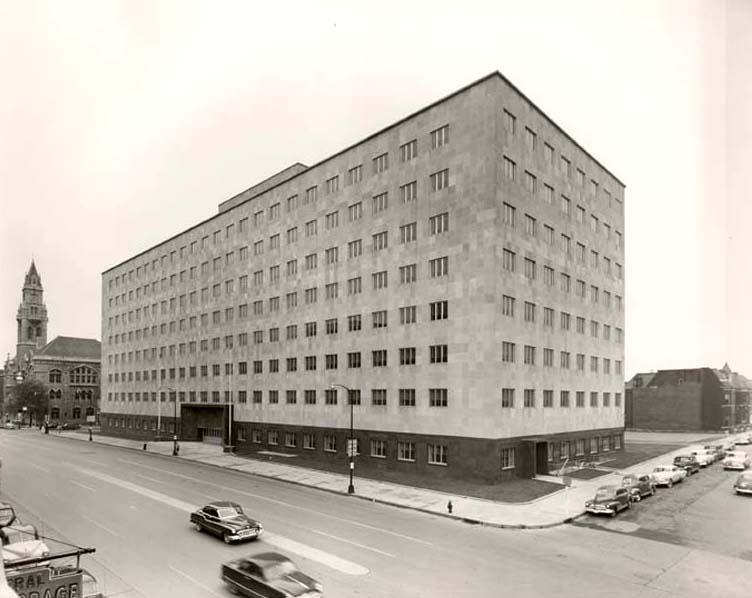
- Photo from 1952

- Location within Tennessee Location within the United States
- Location: 801 Broadway, Nashville, Tennessee
- Coordinates: 36°9′30″N 86°46′58″W
- Built: 1952
- Architect: Allan Stewart Thorn, supervising architect Marr & Holman, architects
- Architectural style: Modern
- NRHP reference No.: 16000739
- Added to NRHP: October 24, 2016

The Estes Kefauver Federal Building & Courthouse Annex is a Federal office building and a courthouse of the United States District Court for the Middle District of Tennessee built in Nashville, Tennessee in 1952. The nine-story annex to the building was completed in 1974.

Named after U.S. Senator Estes Kefauver, the building was designed by the Nashville firm of Marr & Holman in the Modern Style, and construction began in 1948.

Since the completion of the nearby Fred D. Thompson U.S. Courthouse and Federal Building in 2022, the Courts and other Federal Offices have moved to the newer building. The General Services Administration plans to maintain the building and house other federal agencies currently located throughout Nashville.

== See also ==
- List of United States federal courthouses in Tennessee
