= Frank Wiley Wilson =

American judge

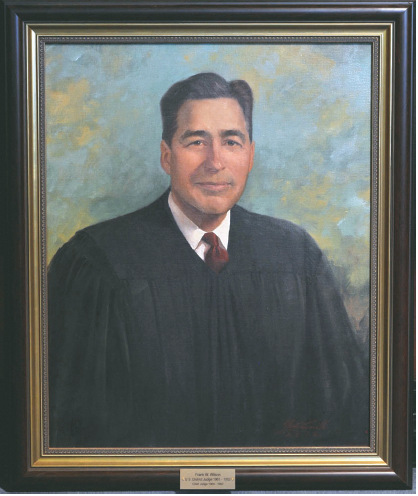

Chief Judge of the United States District Court for the Eastern District of Tennessee
- In office 1969–1982
- Preceded by: Robert Love Taylor
- Succeeded by: Herbert Theodore Milburn

Judge of the United States District Court for the Eastern District of Tennessee
- In office June 15, 1961 – September 29, 1982
- Appointed by: John F. Kennedy
- Preceded by: Leslie Rogers Darr
- Succeeded by: Thomas Gray Hull

Personal details
- Born: Frank Wiley Wilson; June 21, 1917 Knoxville, Tennessee
- Died: September 29, 1982 (aged 65)
- Education: University of Tennessee (A.B.); University of Tennessee College of Law (J.D.)

Frank Wiley Wilson (June 21, 1917 – September 29, 1982) was a United States district judge of the United States District Court for the Eastern District of Tennessee.

== Education and career ==
Born in Knoxville, Tennessee, Wilson received an Artium Baccalaureus degree from the University of Tennessee in 1939 and a Juris Doctor from the University of Tennessee College of Law in 1941. He was in private practice in Knoxville from 1941 to 1942. He was in the United States Army Air Forces as a Sergeant from 1942 to 1946. He was in private practice in Knoxville from 1946 to 1961.

== Federal judicial service ==
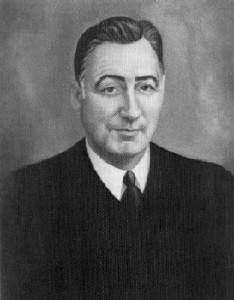
Judicial portrait of Wilson, 2002, by Paul Leveille.

Wilson was nominated by President John F. Kennedy on May 24, 1961, to a seat on the United States District Court for the Eastern District of Tennessee vacated by Judge Leslie Rogers Darr. He was confirmed by the United States Senate on June 14, 1961, and received his commission on June 15, 1961. He served as Chief Judge from 1969 to 1982. His service terminated on September 29, 1982, due to his death.

Wilson is perhaps best known for overseeing the landmark 1964 trial of union leader Jimmy Hoffa in U.S. v. Hoffa. The original trial was held in Nashville, Tennessee, but had to be moved to Chattanooga after the cases ended with a mistrial and allegations of jury tampering. Wilson presided over the subsequent trial in Chattanooga, Tennessee in which Hoffa was tried for jury tampering, mail and wire fraud, and conspiracy. After a 13-week long trial, Hoffa was found guilty on four of twenty counts he faced.

== Sources ==
Legal offices
Preceded by Leslie Rogers Darr	Judge of the United States District Court for the Eastern District of Tennessee; 1961–1982	Succeeded by Thomas Gray Hull
Preceded by Robert Love Taylor	Chief Judge of the United States District Court for the Eastern District of Tennessee; 1969–1982	Succeeded by Herbert Theodore Milburn
