= Robert Love Taylor (judge) =

United States federal judge (1899–1987)

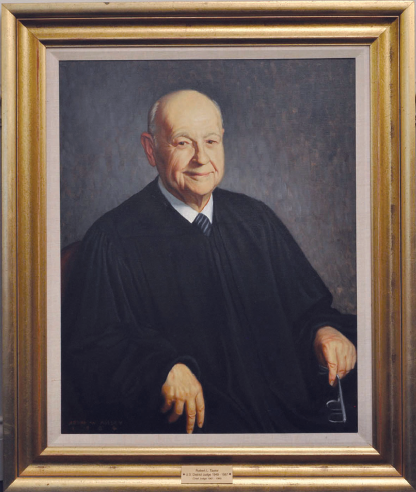

Senior Judge of the United States District Court for the Eastern District of Tennessee
- In office January 15, 1984 – July 11, 1987

Chief Judge of the United States District Court for the Eastern District of Tennessee
- In office 1961–1969
- Preceded by: Leslie Rogers Darr
- Succeeded by: Frank Wiley Wilson

Judge of the United States District Court for the Eastern District of Tennessee
- In office November 2, 1949 – January 15, 1984
- Appointed by: Harry S. Truman
- Preceded by: George Caldwell Taylor
- Succeeded by: Robert Leon Jordan

Personal details
- Born: Robert Love Taylor; December 20, 1899 Embreeville, Tennessee
- Died: July 11, 1987 (aged 87)
- Education: Milligan College (Ph.B.); Yale Law School (LL.B.) read law

Robert Love Taylor (December 20, 1899 – July 11, 1987) was a United States district judge of the United States District Court for the Eastern District of Tennessee.

== Education and career ==
Born in Embreeville, Tennessee, Taylor was the son of longtime Tennessee politician Alfred A. Taylor, and was named for Alfred's brother, Robert Love Taylor, also very active in Tennessee politics. Taylor received a Bachelor of Philosophy degree from Milligan College in 1922 and read law to enter the bar in 1923, also receiving a Bachelor of Laws from Yale Law School in 1924. He was a semi-professional baseball player in Summers, Tennessee from 1920 to 1922. He was in private practice in Johnson City, Tennessee from 1924 to 1949.

== Federal judicial service ==
On November 2, 1949, Taylor received a recess appointment from President Harry S. Truman to a seat on the United States District Court for the Eastern District of Tennessee vacated by Judge George Caldwell Taylor. Formally nominated to the same seat by President Truman on January 5, 1950, Taylor was confirmed by the United States Senate on March 8, 1950, and received his commission on March 9, 1950. He served as Chief Judge from 1961 to 1969. He was a member of the Judicial Conference of the United States from 1972 to 1975. He assumed senior status on January 15, 1984, serving in that capacity until his death on July 11, 1987.

He ordered an injunction against officials at Clinton High School in Clinton, Tennessee after they refused to abide by the U.S. Supreme Court ruling prohibiting the exclusion of African Americans from public schools. The Clinton 12 faced threats and attacks as they attended the school and it was destroyed by dynamite.

== See also ==
- List of United States federal judges by longevity of service

== Sources ==
Legal offices
Preceded by George Caldwell Taylor	Judge of the United States District Court for the Eastern District of Tennessee; 1949–1984	Succeeded by Robert Leon Jordan
Preceded by Leslie Rogers Darr	Chief Judge of the United States District Court for the Eastern District of Tennessee; 1961–1969	Succeeded by Frank Wiley Wilson
