= William L. Campbell Jr. =

American judge (born 1969)

Chip Campbell
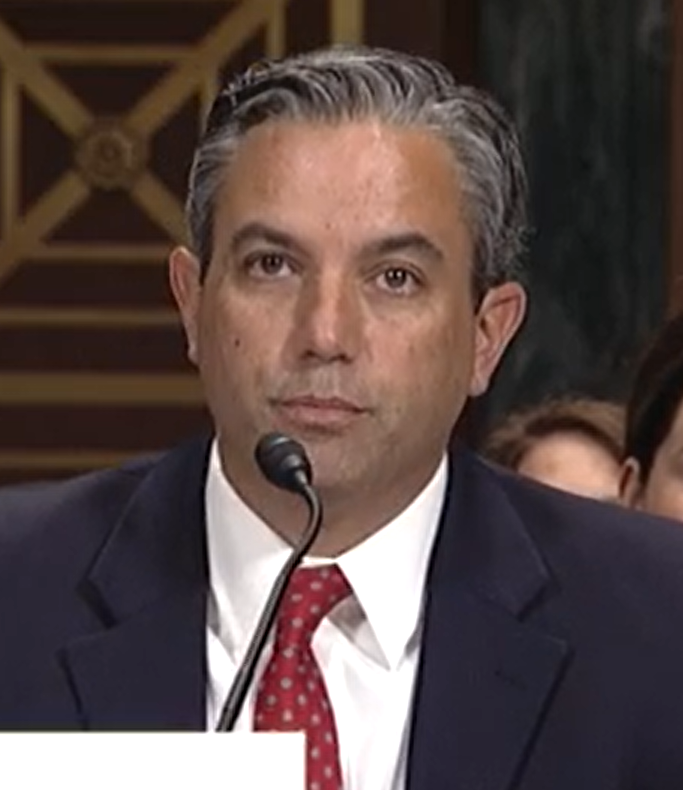

Chief Judge of the United States District Court for the Middle District of Tennessee
- Incumbent
- Assumed office April 15, 2024
- Preceded by: Waverly D. Crenshaw Jr.

Judge of the United States District Court for the Middle District of Tennessee
- Incumbent
- Assumed office January 12, 2018
- Appointed by: Donald Trump
- Preceded by: Kevin H. Sharp

Personal details
- Born: William Lynn Campbell Jr. January 4, 1969 (age 57) Nashville, Tennessee, U.S.
- Education: United States Naval Academy (BS); University of Alabama (JD)

Military service
- Allegiance: United States
- Branch/service: United States Marine Corps
- Years of service: 1991–1998
- Rank: Captain
- Awards: Air Medal (with four bronze stars); Navy and Marine Corps Achievement Medal; Armed Forces Service Medal; National Defense Service Medal; NATO Medal; Navy and Marine Corps Sea Service Deployment Ribbon (with bronze star)

William Lynn "Chip" Campbell Jr. (born January 4, 1969) is an American lawyer who serves as the chief United States district judge of the United States District Court for the Middle District of Tennessee.

== Education ==
Campbell earned a Bachelor of Science in political science from the United States Naval Academy. He served seven years in the United States Marine Corps, principally as a naval flight officer. He received a Juris Doctor from the University of Alabama School of Law, where he served as editor-in-chief of the Alabama Law Review and was an inductee of the Order of the Coif.

== Career ==
He worked as an associate and later a partner in the Nashville firm of Riley Warnock & Jacobson, PLC, and as an associate in the Birmingham, Alabama, office of Maynard, Cooper & Gale, P.C. Before becoming a judge, he was a member in the Nashville office of Frost Brown Todd, LLC, where he handled civil litigation.

=== Federal judicial service ===
On July 13, 2017, President Donald Trump nominated Campbell to serve as a United States District Judge of the United States District Court for the Middle District of Tennessee. On September 6, 2017, the Senate Judiciary Committee held a hearing on his nomination. On October 5, 2017, his nomination was reported out of committee by a voice vote. On January 8, 2018, the United States Senate invoked cloture on his nomination by a 89–1 vote. On January 9, 2018, his nomination was confirmed by a 97–0 vote. He received his judicial commission on January 12, 2018. He became the chief judge on April 15, 2024.

On July 24, 2020, Campbell blocked part of Tennessee's abortion law that would ban abortions in the early stages of pregnancy.

Legal offices
Preceded by Kevin H. Sharp	Judge of the United States District Court for the Middle District of Tennessee; 2018–present	Incumbent
Preceded by Waverly D. Crenshaw Jr.	Chief Judge of the United States District Court for the Middle District of Tennessee; 2024–present	Incumbent
