= Robert L. Echols =

American judge (1941–2025)

Robert Lynn Echols
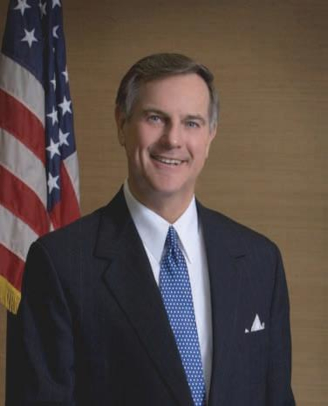

Senior Judge of the United States District Court for the Middle District of Tennessee
- In office March 1, 2007 – July 31, 2010

Chief Judge of the United States District Court for the Middle District of Tennessee
- In office 1998–2005
- Preceded by: John Trice Nixon
- Succeeded by: Todd J. Campbell

Judge of the United States District Court for the Middle District of Tennessee
- In office March 18, 1992 – March 1, 2007
- Appointed by: George H. W. Bush
- Preceded by: Seat established by 104 Stat. 5089
- Succeeded by: Kevin H. Sharp

Personal details
- Born: Robert Lynn Echols; January 13, 1941 Memphis, Tennessee
- Died: August 2, 2025 (aged 84)
- Education: Rhodes College (BA); University of Tennessee College of Law (JD)

Robert Lynn Echols (January 13, 1941 – August 2, 2025) was a United States district judge of the United States District Court for the Middle District of Tennessee.

== Early life, education and military service ==
Born in Memphis, Tennessee, Echols received a Bachelor of Arts degree from Southwestern College (now Rhodes College) in Memphis in 1962 and a Juris Doctor from the University of Tennessee College of Law in 1964. He was in the United States Army in 1966. He served for 35 years in both the United States Army Reserves and the Army National Guard, retiring as a brigadier general in 2001. His last assignment in the military was commander of the 30th Troop Command of the Tennessee Army National Guard.

== Career ==
Echols was a law clerk to Judge Marion S. Boyd of the United States District Court for the Western District of Tennessee from 1965 to 1966. He was a legislative assistant for Congressman Dan Kuykendall in the United States House of Representatives from 1967 to 1969. He was in private practice in Nashville, Tennessee from 1969 to 1992, serving as a night commissioner for Davidson County, Tennessee from 1974 to 1975.

On October 22, 1991, Echols was nominated by President George H. W. Bush to a new seat on the United States District Court for the Middle District of Tennessee created by 104 Stat. 5089. He was confirmed by the United States Senate on March 13, 1992, and received his commission on March 18, 1992. He served as Chief Judge from 1998 to 2005, assuming senior status on March 1, 2007, and retiring fully from the bench on July 31, 2010. In retirement, he practiced law with the Bass, Berry & Sims and Aubrey Harwell law firms, retiring in 2019. He died on August 2, 2025, having suffered from dementia.

== Sources ==
Legal offices
Preceded by Seat established by 104 Stat. 5089	Judge of the United States District Court for the Middle District of Tennessee; 1992–2007	Succeeded by Kevin H. Sharp
Preceded by John Trice Nixon	Chief Judge of the United States District Court for the Middle District of Tennessee; 1998–2005	Succeeded by Todd J. Campbell
