= Kevin H. Sharp =

American judge (born 1963)

Kevin Sharp
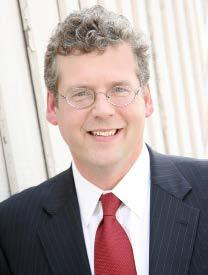

Chief Judge of the United States District Court for the Middle District of Tennessee
- In office October 1, 2014 – April 15, 2017
- Preceded by: William Joseph Haynes Jr.
- Succeeded by: Waverly D. Crenshaw Jr.

Judge of the United States District Court for the Middle District of Tennessee
- In office May 3, 2011 – April 15, 2017
- Appointed by: Barack Obama
- Preceded by: Robert L. Echols
- Succeeded by: William L. Campbell Jr.

Personal details
- Born: January 22, 1963 (age 63) Memphis, Tennessee
- Party: Democratic
- Education: Mesa Community College (AA); Christian Brothers University (BS); Vanderbilt University (JD)

Kevin Hunter Sharp (born January 22, 1963) is a former United States district judge of the United States District Court for the Middle District of Tennessee.

== Early life and education ==
Sharp was born on January 22, 1963, in Memphis, Tennessee. He earned an Associate of Arts from Mesa Community College in 1988. Sharp then received a Bachelor of Science, summa cum laude, from Christian Brothers College (now known as Christian Brothers University) in 1990 and a Juris Doctor from Vanderbilt University School of Law in 1993.

=== Federal judicial service ===
During the 111th Congress, Democrats from the Tennessee House delegation provided recommendations to the Obama White House for filling a vacancy on the United States District Court for the Middle District of Tennessee. Sharp, himself a Democrat, was included on the original list of recommendations, but the delegation ultimately recommended Nashville attorney Kathryn Barnett as its first choice. However, Sharp was the preferred choice of Republican Tennessee Senators Lamar Alexander and Bob Corker.

On November 17, 2010, President Barack Obama nominated Sharp to a judgeship on the Middle District of Tennessee. His nomination was for the seat vacated by Judge Robert L. Echols. On May 2, 2011, the United States Senate confirmed his nomination by a 89–0 vote. He received his commission on May 3, 2011, and served as Chief Judge beginning October 1, 2014. On January 26, 2017, he sent a letter to President Trump resigning his judgeship effective April 15, 2017.

== Personal ==
Sharp's former father-in-law, Lew Conner, is a former state court judge and a prominent Republican fundraiser who has donated over forty thousand dollars to the campaigns and political action committees of Senators Lamar Alexander and Bob Corker.

Legal offices
Preceded by Robert L. Echols	Judge of the United States District Court for the Middle District of Tennessee; 2011–2017	Succeeded by William L. Campbell Jr.
Preceded by William Joseph Haynes Jr.	Chief Judge of the United States District Court for the Middle District of Tennessee; 2014–2017	Succeeded by Waverly D. Crenshaw Jr.
