= Leland Clure Morton =

American judge

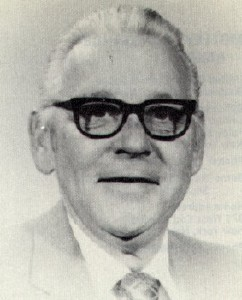

Senior Judge of the United States District Court for the Middle District of Tennessee
- In office July 31, 1984 – April 11, 1998

Chief Judge of the United States District Court for the Middle District of Tennessee
- In office 1977–1984
- Preceded by: Frank Gray Jr.
- Succeeded by: Thomas A. Wiseman Jr.

Judge of the United States District Court for the Middle District of Tennessee
- In office October 14, 1970 – July 31, 1984
- Appointed by: Richard Nixon
- Preceded by: William Ernest Miller
- Succeeded by: Thomas Aquinas Higgins

Personal details
- Born: February 20, 1916 Knoxville, Tennessee
- Died: April 11, 1998 (aged 82) Knoxville, Tennessee
- Education: University of Tennessee (B.A.); University of Tennessee College of Law (J.D.)

Leland Clure Morton (February 20, 1916 – April 11, 1998) was a United States district judge of the United States District Court for the Middle District of Tennessee.

== Education and career ==
Born in Knoxville, Tennessee, Morton received a Bachelor of Arts degree from the University of Tennessee in 1934 and a Juris Doctor from the University of Tennessee College of Law in 1936. He was in private practice in Knoxville from 1937 to 1941. He was an FBI special agent in Washington, D.C., from 1941 to 1945, thereafter returning to private practice in Knoxville, from 1946 to 1970.

== Federal judicial service ==
On September 21, 1970, Morton was nominated by President Richard Nixon to a seat on the United States District Court for the Middle District of Tennessee vacated by Judge William Ernest Miller. Morton was confirmed by the United States Senate on October 8, 1970, and received his commission on October 14, 1970. He served as Chief Judge from 1977 to 1984, assuming senior status on July 31, 1984, and serving in that capacity until his death, on April 11, 1998, in Knoxville.

== Notable cases ==
- Kelley v. Board of Education (1970)
- Waylon Jennings' 1977 arrest (1977)
- Grubbs v. Bradley (1982)

== Honor ==
In 1996, the L. Clure Morton United States Post Office and Courthouse in Cookeville, Tennessee, was renamed in his honor.{congress.gov}

== Sources ==
Legal offices
Preceded by William Ernest Miller	Judge of the United States District Court for the Middle District of Tennessee; 1970–1984	Succeeded by Thomas Aquinas Higgins
Preceded by Frank Gray Jr.	Chief Judge of the United States District Court for the Middle District of Tennessee; 1977–1984	Succeeded by Thomas A. Wiseman Jr.
