= Tennessee Code Commission =

Agency overview
- Formed: 1953
- Jurisdiction: Tennessee
- Headquarters: Nashville, Tennessee
- Website: www.tncourts.gov/boards-commissions/boards-commissions/tennessee-code-commission

The Tennessee Code Commission is a statutory body within the Government of Tennessee responsible for the compilation, publication, and distribution of the official Tennessee Code Annotated (T.C.A.). It is a permanent commission that provides essential services to both the state court system and the Tennessee General Assembly.

== History and purpose ==
The Commission was established in its current form in 1953 to ensure that the state's laws are regularly updated, codified, and made available to the public and legal profession. Prior to the commission's creation, the codification of Tennessee law was often handled by private publishers or sporadic legislative committees.

The Commission's primary mandate is to provide for the publication of the official Tennessee Code, which includes all public acts of a general and permanent nature passed by the General Assembly. Under Tennessee law, the Commission has the authority to enter into contracts with legal publishers—currently LexisNexis—to edit, index, and distribute the statutes.

== Membership ==
According to Tennessee Code § 1-1-101, the commission consists of five members. Three members serve ex officio, while two are appointed by the Chief Justice:

- The Chief Justice of Tennessee, who serves as the chairman of the commission.
- The Attorney General and Reporter.
- The Director of Legal Services for the General Assembly.
- Two additional members appointed by the Chief Justice, typically selected for their legal expertise.

Members receive no salary for their service on the commission but are reimbursed for travel and other necessary expenses incurred while performing official duties.

== Functions ==
The Commission is authorized and directed to formulate and supervise the execution of plans for the compilation, arrangement, classification, annotation, editing, indexing, printing, binding, publication, sale, and distribution of the Tennessee Code.

Specific duties include:

- Preparation of the manuscript for the Tennessee Code Annotated.
- Statutory revision to correct typographical and grammatical errors without altering the legal sense or effect of any act.
- Development and maintenance of the Tennessee Code database for electronic use.
- Certification of the published volumes as the official law of the state of Tennessee.
- Entering into contracts with legal publishers for the distribution of the code.
