= Elmer David Davies =

American judge

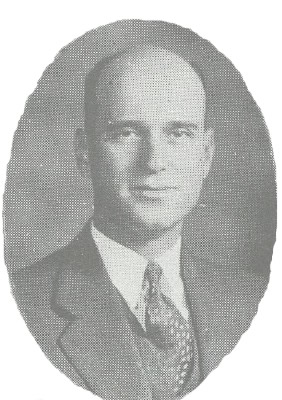

Chief Judge of the United States District Court for the Middle District of Tennessee
- In office 1954–1957
- Preceded by: Office established
- Succeeded by: William Ernest Miller

Judge of the United States District Court for the Middle District of Tennessee
- In office July 12, 1939 – January 7, 1957
- Appointed by: Franklin D. Roosevelt
- Preceded by: John J. Gore
- Succeeded by: Seat abolished

Personal details
- Born: Elmer David Davies; January 12, 1899 Magnolia, Arkansas
- Died: January 7, 1957 (aged 57) Nashville, Tennessee
- Cause of death: Heart attack
- Education: Vanderbilt University Law School (LL.B.)

Elmer David Davies (January 12, 1899 – January 7, 1957) was an American lawyer and politician. He served as a member of the Tennessee State Senate and later served as a United States district judge of the United States District Court for the Middle District of Tennessee.

== Education and career ==
Davies was born on January 12, 1899, in Magnolia, Arkansas. He received a Bachelor of Laws from Vanderbilt University Law School in 1922. Davies joined the Ku Klux Klan in Louisiana and attended a meeting while he was a student at Vanderbilt; however, he later claimed he was disillusioned and stopped going. Davies was in private practice in Nashville, Tennessee, from 1922 to 1939, and served as a member of the Tennessee Senate from 1935 to 1939.

== Federal judicial service ==
Davies was nominated by President Franklin D. Roosevelt on June 19, 1939, to a seat on the United States District Court for the Middle District of Tennessee vacated by Judge John J. Gore. He was confirmed by the United States Senate on July 12, 1939, and received his commission the same day. He served as Chief Judge from 1954 to 1957. His service terminated on January 7, 1957, due to his death of a heart attack in Nashville.

== Sources ==
Legal offices
Preceded by John J. Gore	Judge of the United States District Court for the Middle District of Tennessee; 1939–1957	Succeeded by Seat abolished
Preceded by Office established	Chief Judge of the United States District Court for the Middle District of Tennessee; 1954–1957	Succeeded by William Ernest Miller
