= Todd J. Campbell =

American judge (1956–2021)

Senior Judge of the United States District Court for the Middle District of Tennessee
- In office December 1, 2016 – April 11, 2021

Chief Judge of the United States District Court for the Middle District of Tennessee
- In office 2005–2012
- Preceded by: Robert L. Echols
- Succeeded by: William Joseph Haynes Jr.

Judge of the United States District Court for the Middle District of Tennessee
- In office December 26, 1995 – December 1, 2016
- Appointed by: Bill Clinton
- Preceded by: Thomas A. Wiseman Jr.
- Succeeded by: Eli J. Richardson

Personal details
- Born: Todd Jerome Campbell; September 5, 1956 Rockford, Illinois
- Died: April 11, 2021 (aged 64)
- Party: Democratic
- Education: Vanderbilt University (BA); University of Tennessee College of Law (JD)

Todd Jerome Campbell (September 5, 1956 – April 11, 2021) was a United States district judge of the United States District Court for the Middle District of Tennessee, serving as Chief Judge of the court from 2005 to 2012.

== Early life and education ==
Born in Rockford, Illinois, Campbell received a Bachelor of Arts degree from Vanderbilt University in 1978 and a Juris Doctor from the University of Tennessee College of Law in 1982.

== Professional career ==
A longtime supporter and aide of former Vice President Al Gore, Campbell worked in private law practice in Nashville, Tennessee from 1982 until 1993. He worked as the deputy campaign manager for legal affairs and the treasurer of Gore's presidential campaign committee from 1987 until 1988, and he also worked as legal counsel to the personnel department during Bill Clinton and Al Gore's 1992–1993 presidential transition. In 1993, Campbell took a job working for Gore as Deputy Counsel to the Vice President and director of administration. From 1993 until 1995, Campbell served as counsel to the Vice President and director of administration. He then worked briefly in private practice in Nashville in 1995.

== Federal judicial service ==
On June 27, 1995, President Bill Clinton nominated Campbell to be a United States District Judge of the United States District Court for the Middle District of Tennessee to replace Judge Thomas A. Wiseman Jr., who had taken senior status. The United States Senate confirmed Campbell in a voice vote on December 22, 1995, and he received his commission on December 26, 1995. Campbell served as the chief judge from 2005 to 2012, being succeeded by William Joseph Haynes Jr. He took senior status on December 1, 2016, due to a certified disability. He had been inactive since he took senior status, meaning that while he remained a federal judge, he no longer heard cases or participated in the business of the court.

== Death ==
Campbell died of the effects of multiple system atrophy on April 11, 2021, having suffered from the syndrome for numerous years.

== Sources ==
Legal offices
Preceded by Thomas A. Wiseman Jr.	Judge of the United States District Court for the Middle District of Tennessee; 1995–2016	Succeeded by Eli J. Richardson
Preceded by Robert L. Echols	Chief Judge of the United States District Court for the Middle District of Tennessee; 2005–2012	Succeeded by William Joseph Haynes Jr.
