= Customs House (Nashville, Tennessee) =

- Federal Office Building
- U.S. National Register of Historic Places
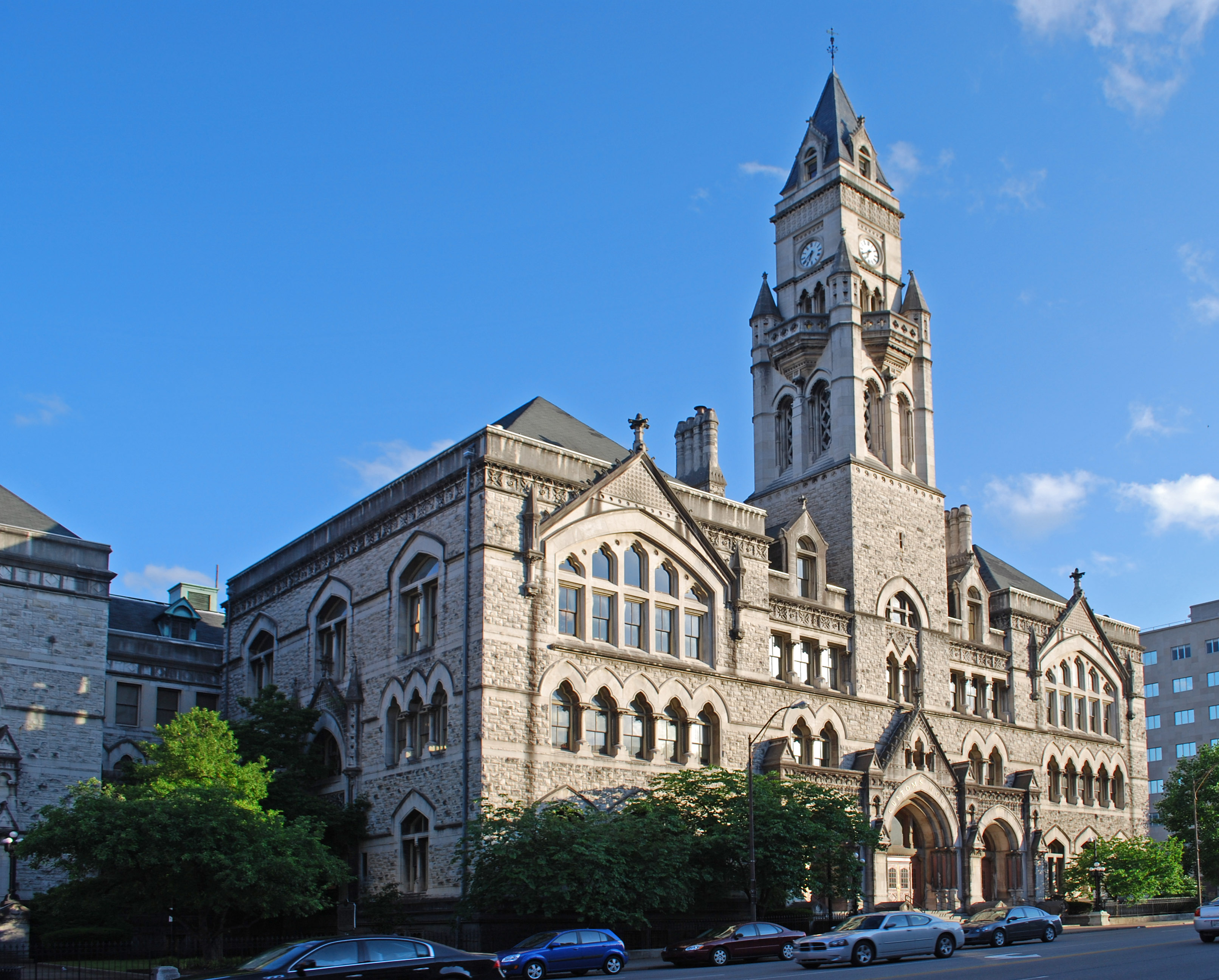
- The Federal Office Building in 2010

- Location within Tennessee
- Location: 701 Broadway, Nashville, Tennessee
- Coordinates: 36°9′31″N 86°46′53″W
- Area: 5 acres (2.0 ha)
- Built: 1876-82; 1903; 1916
- Architect: Office of the Supervising Architect
- Architectural style: Gothic Revival
- NRHP reference No.: 72001232
- Added to NRHP: December 26, 1972

The Customs House is a historic government building in Nashville, Tennessee.

== History and architecture ==
It was built from 1876 to 1882 with limestone from Bowling Green, Kentucky. The building was designed by architects and engineers in the Office of the Supervising Architect under William Appleton Potter, with construction beginning in 1876. It was completed by his successor, James G. Hill, and first occupied in April 1882. A rear wing was added in 1903, which was extended to the east and west in 1916. The building originally housed facilities for the United States Post Office, the United States District Court for the Middle District of Tennessee, the United States Customs Service and other agencies, though several of these would later move to other locations.

It has been listed on the National Register of Historic Places since December 26, 1972 as the Federal Office Building. The building is now privately owned, although it is leased by the United States bankruptcy court for the Middle District of Tennessee.
