= Frank Gray Jr. =

American judge

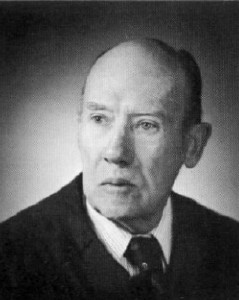

Senior Judge of the United States District Court for the Middle District of Tennessee
- In office July 15, 1977 – September 6, 1978

Chief Judge of the United States District Court for the Middle District of Tennessee
- In office 1970–1977
- Preceded by: William Ernest Miller
- Succeeded by: Leland Clure Morton

Judge of the United States District Court for the Middle District of Tennessee
- In office November 20, 1961 – July 15, 1977
- Appointed by: John F. Kennedy
- Preceded by: Seat established by 75 Stat. 80
- Succeeded by: Thomas A. Wiseman Jr.

Personal details
- Born: Frank Gray Jr. February 25, 1908 Franklin, Tennessee
- Died: September 6, 1978 (aged 70) Franklin, Tennessee
- Education: Cumberland School of Law (LL.B.)

Frank Gray Jr. (February 25, 1908 – September 6, 1978) was a United States district judge of the United States District Court for the Middle District of Tennessee.

== Education and career ==
Born in Franklin, Tennessee, Gray received a Bachelor of Laws from Cumberland School of Law in 1928. He was in private practice of law in Franklin from 1928 to 1961. He was Mayor of Franklin from 1947 to 1961.

== Federal judicial service ==
Gray received a recess appointment from President John F. Kennedy on November 20, 1961, to the United States District Court for the Middle District of Tennessee, to a new seat created by 75 Stat. 80. He was nominated to the same seat by President Kennedy on January 15, 1962. He was confirmed by the United States Senate on February 7, 1962, and received his commission on February 17, 1962. He served as Chief Judge from 1970 to 1977. He assumed senior status on July 15, 1977. His service was terminated on September 6, 1978, due to his death in Franklin.

== Sources ==
Legal offices
Preceded by Seat established by 75 Stat. 80	Judge of the United States District Court for the Middle District of Tennessee; 1961–1977	Succeeded by Thomas A. Wiseman Jr.
Preceded by William Ernest Miller	Chief Judge of the United States District Court for the Middle District of Tennessee; 1970–1977	Succeeded by Leland Clure Morton
