= United States District Court for the Middle District of Tennessee =

United States federal district court in Tennessee

Coordinates: 36.1612°N 86.7828°W

- (M.D. Tenn.)
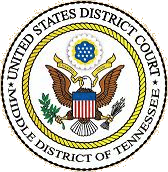

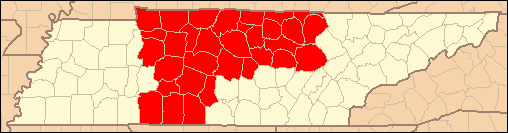
- Location: Fred D. Thompson Federal Building & Courthouse (Nashville) More locations: Columbia; Cookeville
- Appeals to: Sixth Circuit
- Established: June 18, 1839
- Judges: 4
- Chief Judge: William L. Campbell Jr.

Officers of the court
- U.S. Attorney: Braden H. Boucek
- U.S. Marshal: Denny Wade King
- www.tnmd.uscourts.gov

The United States District Court for the Middle District of Tennessee (in case citations, M.D. Tenn.) is the federal trial court for most of Middle Tennessee. Based at the Estes Kefauver Federal Building and United States Courthouse in Nashville, it was created in 1839 when Congress added a third district to the state. Tennessee—along with Kentucky, Ohio, and Michigan—is located within the area covered by United States Court of Appeals for the Sixth Circuit, and appeals are taken to that court (except for patent claims and claims against the U.S. government under the Tucker Act, which are appealed to the Federal Circuit).

As of December 24, 2025 the United States attorney is Braden H. Boucek.

The Middle District has three divisions. (1) The Columbia Division comprises the counties of Giles, Hickman, Lawrence, Lewis, Marshall, Maury, and Wayne. (2) The Northeastern Division comprises the counties of Clay, Cumberland, DeKalb, Fentress, Jackson, Macon, Overton, Pickett, Putnam, Smith, and White. (3) The Nashville Division comprises the counties of Cannon, Cheatham, Davidson, Dickson, Houston, Humphreys, Montgomery, Robertson, Rutherford, Stewart, Sumner, Trousdale, Williamson, and Wilson.

== History ==
The United States District Court for the District of Tennessee was established with one judgeship on January 31, 1797, by 1 Stat. 496. The judgeship was filled by President George Washington's appointment of John McNairy. Since Congress failed to assign the district to a circuit, the court had the jurisdiction of both a district court and a circuit court. Appeals from this one district court went directly to the United States Supreme Court.

On February 13, 1801, in the famous "Midnight Judges" Act of 1801, 2 Stat. 89, Congress abolished the U.S. district court in Tennessee, and expanded the number of circuits to six, provided for independent circuit court judgeships, and abolished the necessity of Supreme Court Justices riding the circuits. It was this legislation which created the grandfather of the present Sixth Circuit. The act provided for a "Sixth Circuit" comprising two districts in the State of Tennessee, one district in the State of Kentucky and one district, called the Ohio District, composed of the Ohio and Indiana territories (the latter including the present State of Michigan). The new Sixth Circuit Court was to be held at "Bairdstown" in the District of Kentucky, at Knoxville in the District of East Tennessee, at Nashville in the District of West Tennessee, and at Cincinnati in the District of Ohio. Unlike the other circuits which were provided with three circuit judges, the Sixth Circuit was to have only one circuit judge with district judges from Kentucky and Tennessee comprising the rest of the court. Any two judges constituted a quorum. New circuit judgeships were to be created as district judgeships in Kentucky and Tennessee became vacant.

The repeal of this Act restored the District on March 8, 1802, 2 Stat. 132. The District was divided into the Eastern and Western Districts on April 29, 1802. On February 24, 1807, Congress again abolished the two districts and created the United States Circuit for the District of Tennessee. On March 3, 1837, Congress assigned the judicial district of Tennessee to the Eighth Circuit. On June 18, 1839, by 5 Stat. 313, Congress divided Tennessee into three districts, Eastern, Middle, and Western. Again, only one judgeship was allotted for all three districts. On July 15, 1862, Congress reassigned appellate jurisdiction to the Sixth Circuit. Finally, on June 14, 1878, Congress authorized a separate judgeship for the Western District of Tennessee, at which time President Rutherford B. Hayes appointed David M. Key as judge for the Eastern and Middle Districts of Tennessee. The first judge to serve only the Middle District of Tennessee was John J. Gore, appointed by Warren G. Harding.

== Current judges ==
As of April 15, 2024:

#	Title	Judge	Duty station	Born	Term of service			Appointed by
#	Title	Judge	Duty station	Born	Active	Chief	Senior	Appointed by
23	Chief Judge	William L. Campbell Jr.	Nashville	1969	2018–present	2024–present	—	Trump
19	District Judge	Aleta Arthur Trauger	Nashville	1945	1998–present	—	—	Clinton
22	District Judge	Waverly D. Crenshaw Jr.	Nashville	1956	2016–present	2017–2024	—	Obama
24	District Judge	Eli J. Richardson	Nashville	1967	2018–present	—	—	Trump

== Former judges ==
#	Judge	Born–died	Active service	Chief Judge	Senior status	Appointed by	Reason for termination
1	Morgan Welles Brown	1800–1853	1839–1853 (Note: Jointly appointed to the Eastern, Middle, and Western Districts of Tennessee)	—	—	Jackson/Operation of law	death
2	West Hughes Humphreys	1806–1882	1853–1862	—	—	Pierce	removal
3	Connally Findlay Trigg	1810–1880	1862–1880 (Note: Jointly appointed to the Eastern and Middle Districts of Tennessee. From 1862 to 1878, Judge Trigg was jointly appointed to the Western District of Tennessee.)	—	—	Lincoln	death
4	David M. Key	1824–1900	1880–1895 (Note: Jointly appointed to the Eastern and Middle Districts of Tennessee.)	—	—	Hayes	retirement
5	Charles Dickens Clark	1847–1908	1895–1908	—	—	Cleveland	death
6	Edward Terry Sanford	1865–1930	1908–1923	—	—	T. Roosevelt	elevation
7	John J. Gore	1878–1939	1923–1939	—	—	Harding	death
8	Xenophon Hicks	1872–1952	1923–1928	—	—	Harding	elevation
9	Leslie Rogers Darr	1886–1967	1939–1940	—	—	F. Roosevelt	reassignment
10	Elmer David Davies	1899–1957	1939–1957	1954–1957	—	F. Roosevelt	death
11	William Ernest Miller	1908–1976	1955–1970	1961–1970	—	Eisenhower	elevation
12	Frank Gray Jr.	1908–1978	1961–1977 (Note: Recess appointment; formally nominated on January 15, 1962, confirmed by the United States Senate on February 7, 1962, and received commission on February 17, 1962.)	1970–1977	1977–1978	Kennedy	death
13	Leland Clure Morton	1916–1998	1970–1984	1977–1984	1984–1998	Nixon	death
14	Thomas A. Wiseman Jr.	1930–2020	1978–1995	1984–1991	1995–2011	Carter	retirement
15	John Trice Nixon	1933–2019	1980–1998	1991–1998	1998–2019	Carter	death
16	Thomas Aquinas Higgins	1932–2018	1984–1999	—	1999–2018	Reagan	death
17	Robert L. Echols	1941–2025	1992–2007	1998–2005	2007–2010	G.H.W. Bush	retirement
18	Todd J. Campbell	1956–2021	1995–2016	2005–2012	2016–2021	Clinton	death
20	William Joseph Haynes Jr.	1949–present	1999–2014	2012–2014	2014–2017	Clinton	retirement
21	Kevin H. Sharp	1963–present	2011–2017	2014–2017	—	Obama	resignation

== Chief judges ==
Chief judges have administrative responsibilities with respect to their district court. Unlike the Supreme Court, where one justice is specifically nominated to be chief, the office of chief judge rotates among the district court judges. To be chief, a judge must have been in active service on the court for at least one year, be under the age of 65, and have not previously served as chief judge.

A vacancy is filled by the judge highest in seniority among the group of qualified judges. The chief judge serves for a term of seven years, or until age 70, whichever occurs first. The age restrictions are waived if no members of the court would otherwise be qualified for the position.

When the office was created in 1948, the chief judge was the longest-serving judge who had not elected to retire, on what has since 1958 been known as senior status, or declined to serve as chief judge. After August 6, 1959, judges could not become or remain chief after turning 70 years old. The current rules have been in operation since October 1, 1982.

== Succession of seats ==
Seat 1
Seat assigned on June 18, 1839 by 5 Stat. 313 (concurrent with Eastern and Western Districts)
Brown	1839–1853
Humphreys	1853–1862
Trigg	1862–1880
Concurrency with Western District abolished on June 14, 1878 by 20 Stat. 132
Key	1880–1895
Clark	1895–1908
Sanford	1908–1923
Hicks	1923–1928
Seat reassigned solely to Eastern District on May 23, 1928 pursuant to 42 Stat. 837

Seat 2
Seat established on September 14, 1922 by 42 Stat. 837
Gore	1923–1939
Davies	1939–1957
Seat abolished on January 7, 1957 (temporary judgeship expired)

Seat 3
Seat established on May 31, 1938 by 52 Stat. 584 (temporary, concurrent with Eastern District)
Darr	1939–1940
Seat reassigned solely to Eastern District and made permanent on November 27, 1940 by 54 Stat. 1216

Seat 4
Seat established on February 10, 1954 by 68 Stat. 8, 10 (temporary)
Seat became permanent upon the abolition of Seat 2 on January 7, 1957
Miller	1955–1970
Morton	1970–1984
Higgins	1984–1999
Haynes Jr.	1999–2014
Crenshaw Jr.	2016–present

Seat 5
Seat established on May 19, 1961 by 75 Stat. 80
Gray Jr.	1962–1977
Wiseman Jr.	1978–1995
T. Campbell	1995–2016
Richardson	2018–present

Seat 6
Seat established on October 20, 1978 by 92 Stat. 1629
Nixon	1980–1998
Trauger	1998–present

Seat 7
Seat established on December 1, 1990 by 104 Stat. 5089
Echols	1992–2007
Sharp	2011–2017
W. Campbell Jr.	2018–present

== See also ==
- Courts of Tennessee
- List of current United States district judges
- List of United States federal courthouses in Tennessee
