= Chris Guthrie (law school dean) =

Chris Guthrie (born April 7, 1967) is dean of Vanderbilt Law School in Nashville, Tennessee. Guthrie was named Vanderbilt Law School’s dean in 2009, succeeding Edward L. Rubin. He joined Vanderbilt’s law faculty in 2002 and served as the law school’s associate dean for academic affairs from 2004-08.

== Background ==
Guthrie earned his undergraduate degree in political science with honors in 1989 from Stanford University, where he received the Lloyd W. Dinkelspiel Award and was inducted into Phi Beta Kappa. He earned a master’s degree in education from the Harvard Graduate School of Education in 1991, and a J.D. from Stanford Law School in 1994. He practiced law with Fenwick & West in Palo Alto, California, and remained a consulting attorney there for two years after joining the law faculty at the University of Missouri School of Law in 1996. He received three teaching awards while serving on the law faculty at the University of Missouri.

He was a visiting law professor at the Washington University School of Law in 2000, Vanderbilt Law School in 2001 and Northwestern University School of Law, where he received the outstanding first-year course professor award, in 2004.

Guthrie studies behavioral law and economics, dispute resolution, negotiation and judicial decision making. He is a co-author of Dispute Resolution & Lawyers (West, 4th ed., 2009) with Leonard L. Riskin, James E. Westbrook, Richard C. Reuben, Jennifer K. Robbennolt and Nancy A. Welsh. His journal articles have received two CPR Institute for Dispute Resolution Professional Article Prizes. To date, he has published more than 40 scholarly articles and essays in law journals, including the University of Chicago Law Review, Cornell Law Review, Michigan Law Review, Northwestern University Law Review, the University of Pennsylvania Law Review, the Southern California Law Review and the Vanderbilt Law Review.

His 2007 Cornell Law Review article, “Blinking at the Bench” (Vol. 93, Issue 1), co-authored with Jeffrey J. Rachlinkski and Andrew J. Wistrich, proposed a new model of judging based on empirical studies of judicial reasoning and decision making, and was featured in “Judges: They’re Just Like Us!” in the June 2008 edition of the ABA Journal.

Guthrie is a member of the American Bar Association and its Section on Dispute Resolution and serves on the board of the Nashville Conflict Resolution Center. At Vanderbilt, Guthrie has taught Torts, Negotiation and Dispute Resolution.
