= Annual Review of Law and Social Science =

- Discipline: Law; Social science
- Language: English
- Edited by: Carol A. Heimer

Publication details
- History: 2005–present, 21 years old
- Publisher: Annual Reviews (US)
- Frequency: Annually
- Open access: Subscribe to Open
- Impact factor: 3.2 (2025)

Standard abbreviations
- ISO 4: Annu. Rev. Law Soc. Sci.

Indexing
- ISSN: 1550-3585 (print); 1550-3631 (web)
- OCLC no.: 55135983

Links
- Journal homepage

The Annual Review of Law and Social Science is a peer-reviewed academic journal that publishes an annual volume of review articles relevant to the interconnection of law, culture, social structure, and society. It was established in 2005 and is published by Annual Reviews (AR). Its current editor is Carol A. Heimer. As of 2023, it is being published as open access, under the Subscribe to Open model.

== History ==
The Annual Review of Law and Social Science was first published in 2005 by Annual Reviews (AR), a nonprofit organization whose stated mission is to synthesize knowledge "for the progress of science and the benefit of society." As of 2021, it is published both in print and electronically. Its inaugural editor was John L. Hagan. Hagan was followed by Robert J. MacCoun (2018-2023). As of November 2023, Carol A. Heimer was listed as the editor.

== Scope and indexing ==
The Annual Review of Law and Social Science defines its scope as covering significant developments in the field of law. Its reviews examine the interconnections of law, culture, social structure, and society. Most volumes include a prefatory chapter in which a prominent scholar in the field reflects on their careers and experiences. As of 2026, Journal Citation Reports lists the journal's 2025 impact factor as 3.2, ranking it as 16th out of 443 journal titles in the category "Law" and 21st of 222 titles in "Sociology". It is abstracted and indexed in Scopus, Social Sciences Citation Index, IBZ Online, Criminal Justice Abstracts, Political Science Complete, and Academic Search, among others.

== Editorial processes ==
The Annual Review of Law and Social Science is helmed by the editor or the co-editors. The editor is assisted by the editorial committee, which includes associate editors, regular members, and occasionally guest editors. Guest members participate at the invitation of the editor, and serve terms of one year. All other members of the editorial committee are appointed by the AR board of directors and serve five-year terms. The editorial committee determines which topics should be included in each volume and solicits reviews from qualified authors. Unsolicited manuscripts are not accepted. Peer review of accepted manuscripts is undertaken by the editorial committee.

=== List of editors ===
- John L. Hagan (2005–2018)
- Robert J. MacCoun (2018–2023)
- Carol A. Heimer (November 2023 – present)

=== Current editorial board ===
As of 2023, the editorial committee consists of the editor and the following members:

- Michael W. McCann
- Martin Krygier
- Ron Levi
- Osagie Obasogie
- Arzoo Osanloo
- Jennifer Robbennolt
