= William Frierson Cooper =

American judge

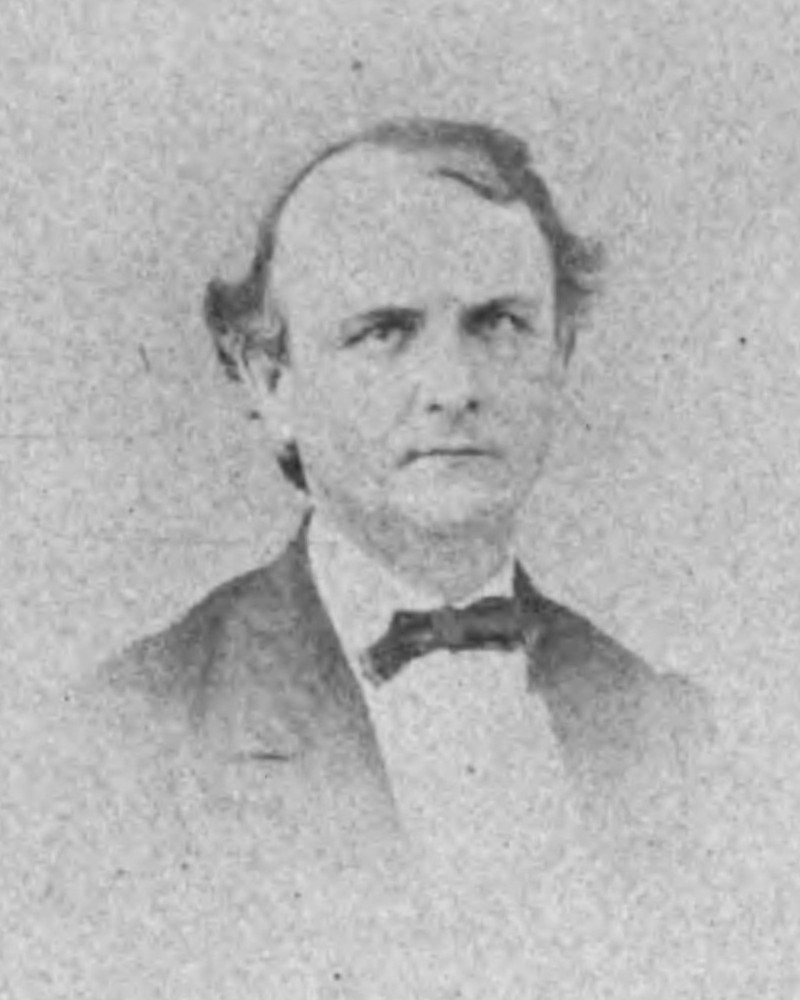
- Born: March 11, 1820; Franklin, Williamson County, Tennessee, U.S.
- Died: May 7, 1909 (aged 89); Brooklyn, New York City, U.S.
- Resting place: Zion Presbyterian Church Cemetery, Maury County, Tennessee, U.S.
- Education: Yale College; University of Pennsylvania
- Occupation: Lawyer
- Parent(s): Matthew D. Cooper; Mary Agnes Frierson
- Relatives: Edmund Cooper (brother); Henry Cooper (brother); Duncan Brown Cooper (half-brother)

William Frierson Cooper (March 11, 1820 – May 7, 1909) was a lawyer, planter and politician. He was nominated to the Supreme Court of the Confederate States of America by President Jefferson Davis, but the court never sat because of the American Civil War. After the war, he served as the Dean of the Vanderbilt University Law School from 1874 to 1875. He was a judge of the Tennessee Supreme Court from 1878 to 1886.

== Early life ==
Cooper was born on March 11, 1820, in Franklin, Tennessee. His father, Matthew D. Cooper, was a merchant who later became a banker in Columbia, Tennessee. His mother was Mary Agnes Frierson. His paternal grandfather, Robert Cooper, served in the American Revolutionary War. He had three brothers, including U.S. Congressman Edmund Cooper and U.S. Senator Henry Cooper, and two half-brothers, including Duncan Brown Cooper. He grew up in Columbia, Tennessee, where he was raised as a Presbyterian. He wintered in New Orleans, Louisiana, in 1832, and learned to speak French.

Cooper graduated from Yale College with a B.A. degree in 1838. While he was at Yale, one of his professors was Alphonso Taft. Following college, he returned home to Columbia and began the study of medicine. After two years' study in Tennessee, he went to Philadelphia, where he attended medical lectures at the University of Pennsylvania, then abandoned the medical field for law. He joined the law offices of his uncle, Chancellor Samuel Davies Frierson, in Maury County, Tennessee. He was admitted to the bar in 1841.

== Career ==
Cooper was the manager of his family Mulberry Hill Plantation in Maury County, Tennessee from 1840 to 1845. Meanwhile, he also practised the law alongside Samuel Davies Frierson. From 1845 to 1846, he formed a law firm with Alfred Osborn Pope Nicholson. From 1846 to 1851, he practised the law on his own.

In 1851–1852, with Return J. Meigs III, Cooper were appointed to codify the laws of Tennessee. They completed their project in 1858, and their work was adopted, almost without modification, as the state's official code. In 1861, Cooper was elected to the Tennessee Supreme Court to fill the seat vacated by the resignation of Robert L. Caruthers. In December, he was sworn in, but the court never convened before being dissolved in September 1862 because of the Civil War.

Cooper was initially reluctant to embrace secession, but he fully supported the Confederate States of America (CSA) once it was established. Meanwhile, he was nominated to the Supreme Court of the CSA by President Jefferson Davis, but the court never came to fruition. Meanwhile, Cooper traveled in Europe. He made a study of the courts in London, England, concentrating on equity jurisprudence.

Cooper resumed legal practice in Nashville after the war, forming a successful partnership first with Robert L. Caruthers and then with his brother Henry Cooper. He served as the Dean of the Vanderbilt University Law School from 1874 to 1875, when he was succeeded by Thomas H. Malone. He was elected again to the Tennessee Supreme Court in August 1878 and served on the court until 1886.

In 1890 he was awarded honorary degrees by Yale University, the University of Tennessee, and the University of Nashville.

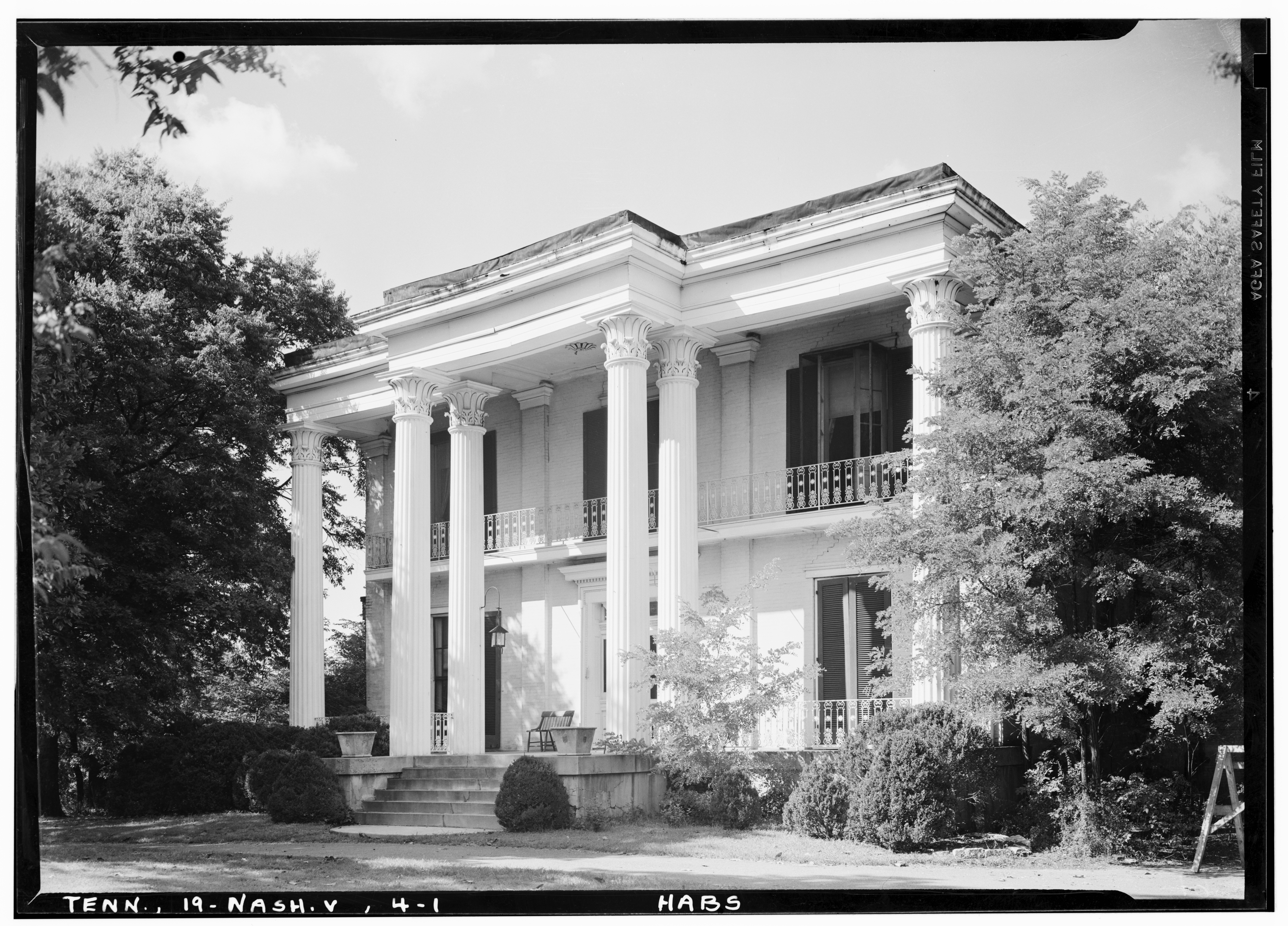
Riverwood.

== Personal life ==
Cooper never married. He resided at Riverview in East Nashville until he purchased Riverwood, another mansion in Nashville, in 1859. He renamed the property Riverwood because of its location on bluffs on the north side of the Cumberland River.

== Death and legacy ==
Cooper died on May 7, 1909, in Brooklyn, New York City. He was buried at the Zion Presbyterian Church Cemetery in Ashwood, Tennessee. Upon his death, Riverwood passed to his half-brother, Duncan Brown Cooper.
