= Senator Cooper =

Senator Cooper may refer to:

== Members of the United States Senate ==
- Henry Cooper (U.S. senator) (1827–1884), U.S. Senator from Tennessee 1871 to 1877
- James Cooper (Pennsylvania politician) (1810–1863), U.S. Senator from Pennsylvania from 1849 to 1855
- John Sherman Cooper (1901–1991), U.S. Senator from Kentucky from 1956 to 1973
- Roy Cooper (born 1957), U.S. Senator-elect from North Carolina

== United States state senate members ==
- Charles Merian Cooper (1856–1923), Florida State Senate
- Daniel C. Cooper (1773–1818), Ohio State Senate
- Duncan Brown Cooper (1844–1922), Tennessee State Senate
- George B. Cooper (politician) (1808–1866), Michigan State Senate
- Henry Allen Cooper (1850–1931), Wisconsin State Senate
- Jerry W. Cooper (born 1948), Tennessee State Senate
- John Cooper (Arkansas politician) (born 1947), Arkansas State Senate
- John Cooper (Nebraska politician) (1911–1991), Nebraska State Senate
- Prentice Cooper (1895–1969), Tennessee State Senate
- Samuel B. Cooper (1850–1918), Texas State Senate
- Stan Cooper (born 1940), Wyoming State Senate
- Thomas Valentine Cooper (1835–1909), Pennsylvania State Senate
- Thomas Cooper (Delaware politician) (1764–1829), Delaware State Senate
