= Ruhl =

Ruhl is a surname. Notable people with the surname include:

- Ludwig Sigismund Ruhl (1794–1887), German painter
- William Ruhl (1901 – 1956), American character actor
- Dave Ruhl (1920–1988), Canadian professional wrestler
- Donald J. Ruhl (1923–1945), American Marine; awarded Medal of Honor for action at Iwo Jima
- Henry Ruhl (1909–1945), American murderer; executed in Wyoming
- J. B. Ruhl (fl. 2006), American legal academic specializing in environmental law
- Sarah Ruhl (born 1974), American playwright

Middle name:

- Henry Ruhl Guss (1825-1907), Union Army brevet Major General
