= Duncan Brown Cooper =

American journalist, publisher, politician

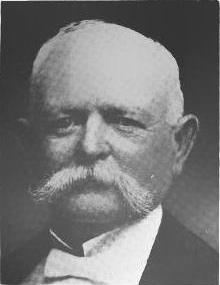
- Cooper, c. 1908
- Born: April 21, 1844; Columbia, Tennessee, U.S.
- Died: November 4, 1922 (aged 78)
- Resting place: Zion Presbyterian Church
- Education: Jefferson College (now known as Washington & Jefferson College)
- Occupations: Journalist, politician
- Spouse(s): Florence Fleming (1865-1870; her death); Mary Polk Jones (18??-1893; her death)
- Children: 8
- Parent(s): Matthew Delamere Cooper; Marian Witherspoon Brown
- Relatives: William Frierson Cooper (half-brother); Lucius E. Burch (son-in-law); Lucius E. Burch, Jr. (grandson)

Duncan Brown Cooper (April 21, 1844 – November 4, 1922) was an American journalist, publisher and Democratic politician. He served in both the Tennessee House of Representatives and in the Tennessee Senate.

In 1908, he became involved in a feud with a political opponent and newspaper competitor, Edward W. Carmack. Cooper warned Carmack that if his name appeared again in Carmack's newspaper, The Tennessean, he would retaliate. Cooper and his son did in fact retaliate after Carmack ignored the warning and continued to attack and satirize Cooper. Carmack was shot and killed shortly thereafter.

In the court case that followed Carmack's murder, Cooper and his son were convicted of second degree murder, and Duncan Cooper was given a sentence of 20 years in prison. His son was granted a new trial on appeal, but the prosecution decided against pursuing the case.

== Early life ==
Duncan Brown Cooper was born at "Mulberry Hill" near Columbia, Maury County, Tennessee in 1844. He attended Jefferson College in Canonsburg, Pennsylvania, now known as Washington & Jefferson College.

His father was Matthew Delamere Cooper (1792–1878) and his mother, Marian Witherspoon (Brown) Cooper (1822–1861), was his father's third wife. His half-brother was William Frierson Cooper (1820–1909), who became a member of the Tennessee Supreme Court and owned the Riverwood Mansion. His daughter, Sarah, married Dr. Lucius Burch, a Dean of the Vanderbilt University School of Medicine. Their son was Lucius E. Burch, Jr.

== Career ==
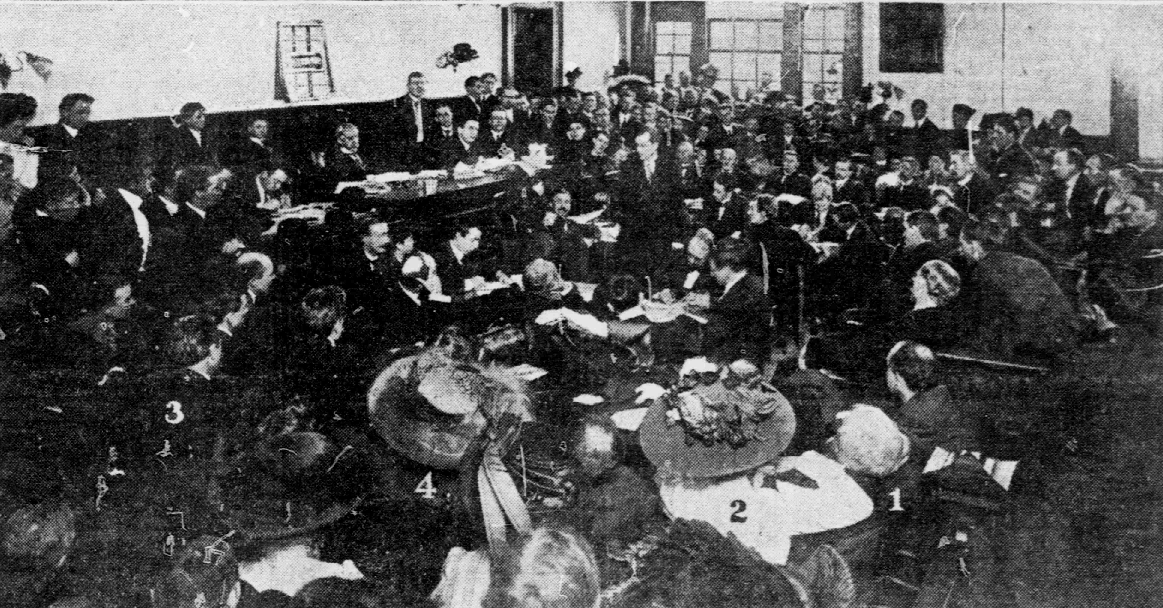
Murder trial of Duncan and Robin Cooper, 1909

During the American Civil War, Cooper fought in the Confederate States Army. He was captured at Fort Donelson in Tennessee in 1862. He returned to Nashville after the war and became involved in politics. After the Reconstruction era, Cooper was elected as a Democratic state representative in 1881 and state senator in 1895. He was also the publisher of the Nashville American, a conservative Democratic daily newspaper.

Cooper worked on the 1908 gubernatorial campaign of Malcolm R. Patterson, who was elected and served as Governor of Tennessee from 1907 to 1911. Both Cooper and Patterson were opposed to prohibition. Patterson's gubernatorial opponent, Edward W. Carmack, was the editor of The Tennessean. He grew embittered and published scathing articles about Cooper.

On November 9, 1908, Cooper and his son Robin encountered Carmack on a Nashville street. Out of fear, Carmack fired first on the father and son, wounding the son. Robin Cooper retaliated, killing Carmack.

During the first trial, both Cooper and his son Robin were convicted of second-degree murder and sentenced to 20 years in prison. Governor Patterson granted a pardon to Cooper and saved him from jail. Shortly after, Robin was granted a second trial on appeal. He was released after the prosecutor decided not to retry the case. However, he was still vilified in the temperance press and shunned by Nashvillians. Governor Patterson found that he had damaged his political career by pardoning Cooper. Also, Patterson's veto of a popular prohibition bill in 1909 and his attempts to control the state Democratic primaries in 1910 created a division in the party that allowed Ben W. Hooper to become the first Republican governor elected in the state in nearly 30 years.

== Personal life ==
In 1865, Cooper married Florence Fleming (1843-1870); the couple had three children. After her death, he remarried, to Mary Polk Jones (1856-1893). They had five children. In 1909, Cooper inherited Riverwood, his late brother's mansion.

== Death ==
Cooper died in 1922, aged 78. He was buried in the cemetery of Zion Presbyterian Church in Columbia, Tennessee.

== Bibliography ==
- Lacy, Eric Russell. "Tennessee Teetotalism: Social Forces and the Politics or Progressivism" Tennessee Historical Quarterly Vol. 24, No. 3 (1965), pp. 219-240 online
- Summerville, James (1994). The Carmack-Cooper Shooting: Tennessee Politics Turns Violent, November 9, 1908. McFarland & Company. ISBN 9780786400126 – via Google Books.
