= Skiba =

Skiba is a surname. Notable people with the surname include:

- Aleksander Skiba (1945–2000), Polish volleyball player and coach
- Bridgette Skiba (born 1999), American soccer player
- Daniel Skiba (born 2000), Polish footballer
- Galina Skiba (born 1984), Russian ice hockey player
- Gerhard Skiba (1947–2019), Austrian politician
- Henri Skiba (1927–2018), French football player
- Jakub Skiba (born 1961), Polish civil servant and diplomat
- Jeff Skiba (born 1984), American Paralympian athlete
- Krzysztof Skiba (born 1964), Polish musician, songwriter, satirist, essayist and actor
- Leszek Skiba (born 1978), Polish banker and politician
- Matt Skiba (born 1976), American musician
- Paige Skiba, American economist
- Piotr Skiba (born 1982), Polish professional footballer
- Russell Skiba, American educational psychologist
- Zuzanna Skiba, German artist

== Other ==
- Szymon, Katarzina & Feliks Skiba, fictional characters in the 2013 Polish film Ida
