= Riverwood (Nashville, Tennessee) =

Historic house in Tennessee, United States

- U.S. National Register of Historic Places
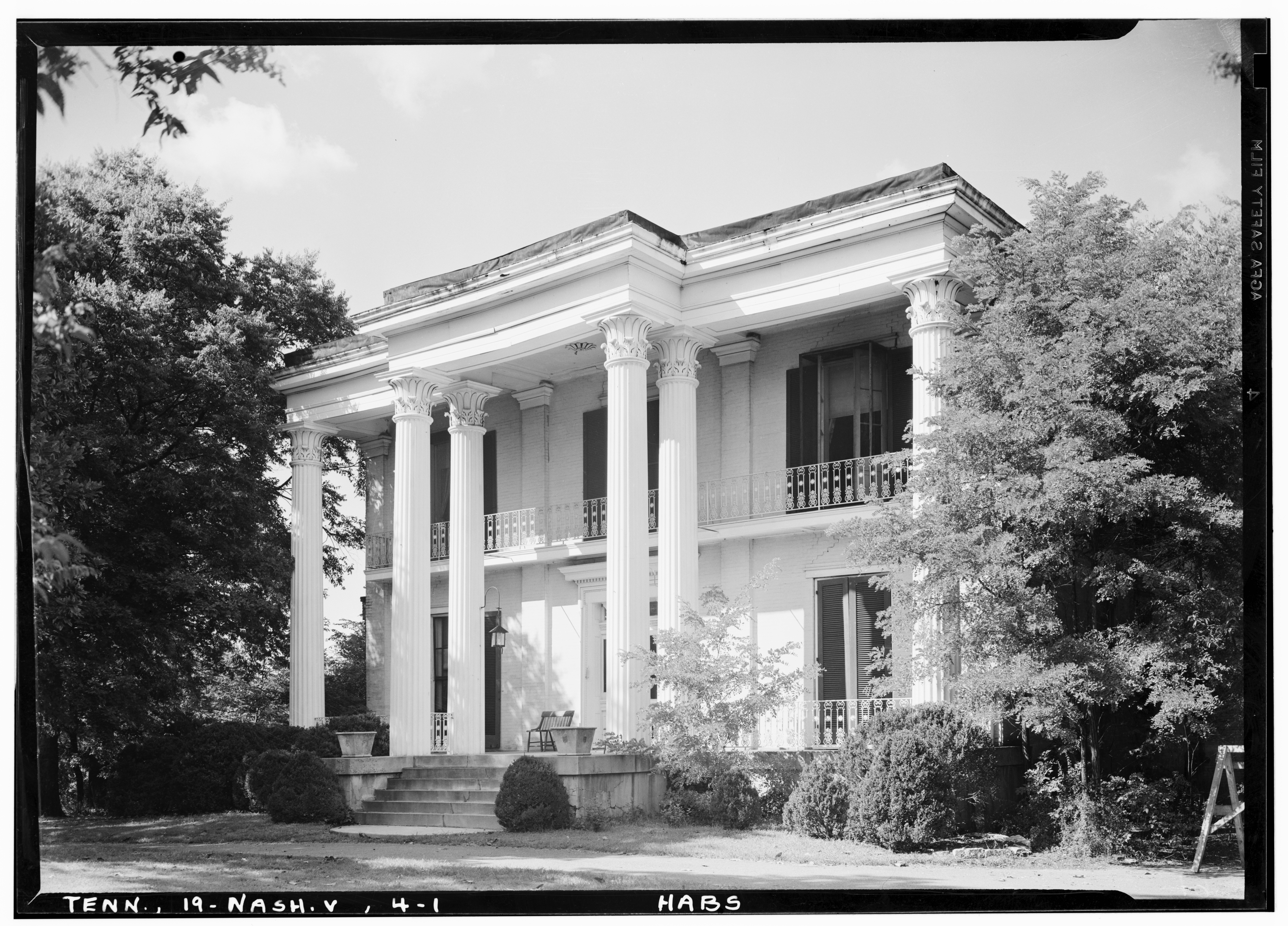

- Location within Tennessee Location within the United States
- Location: 1833 Welcome Lane, Nashville, Tennessee
- Coordinates: 36°12′0″N 86°42′36″W
- Area: 6 acres (2.4 ha)
- Architectural style: Greek Revival
- NRHP reference No.: 77001264
- Added to NRHP: July 20, 1977

Riverwood is a privately owned historic house located in Nashville, Tennessee, United States. At 9,200 square-feet it sits on 8 acres of its original 2,500 acres. It has been a wedding and event facility since 1997.

== Location ==
The mansion is located at 1833 Welcome Lane in Nashville, Tennessee.

== History ==
About 1795, Phillip Philips (1730–1797) and Susannah Phillips (1749–1805) purchased the land and commenced constructing their home. This home was constructed less than 2 decades after the founding of Nashville. He was a land speculator and built a fortune. Originally, they owned about 2,500 acres. After Phillp’s death, Susannah remained on the farm and managed it until her death. The rear wing was built by Alexander Porter, an Irish immigrant who came to Nashville in the mid-1790s. He originally named it Tammany Woods after his family home in Ireland. By the 1820s, he built a two-story Federal-style home a few feet away from the rear wing. In 1850, a third story was added, alongside a Greek Revival portico supported by six ”Tower of the Winds” Corinthian columns. Guests included President Andrew Jackson (1767–1845) and his wife Rachel Jackson (1767–1828), who was an aunt to Alexander's son's wife.

In 1859, Judge William Frierson Cooper (1820–1909), a member of the Tennessee Supreme Court, purchased the property. He renamed it Riverwood as it was by the Cumberland River. His brothers and their wives lived in the house with him. In the 1880s and 1890s, plumbing and electricity were added. The dining room was also extended, and the two houses were united. After his death in 1909, his brother Duncan Brown Cooper inherited the property.

When Cooper died in 1922, his daughter Sarah and her husband Dr. Lucius E. Burch, a Dean of the Vanderbilt University School of Medicine, inherited the house. They had a son, Lucius E. Burch, Jr. Their annual Christmas Dinner was attended by the Nashville elite. Robert Penn Warren spent a summer in one of their cottages during his stay at Vanderbilt University. Presidents Andrew Jackson, James K. Polk (1795–1849), Franklin Pierce (1804–1869), Andrew Johnson (1808–1875), Grover Cleveland (1837–1908), Theodore Roosevelt (1858–1919), and William Howard Taft (1857–1930) and Vice President Adlai Stevenson I (1835–1914) visited the house. The Burches lived in it until 1975.

The property was purchased by Joe and Jackie Glynn in 1994. Over the next three years, the Glynns restored the property and opened the property to facilitate weddings and small events in 1997.

In June 2015, the Glynn's sold the property to investors Debbie Sutton, Steven R Shelton, and Matt Wilson.

Riverwood Mansion has been featured in multiple music videos, television shows, and magazines, most recently on the October 2015 cover of Southern Living Magazine, featuring Reese Witherspoon.

== Architectural significance ==
It was listed on the National Register of Historic Places on July 20, 1977.
