= Lansden =

Lansden is a surname. Notable people with the surname include:

- D. L. Lansden (1869–1924), American judge
- Merle Lansden (1907–1989), American attorney, judge, and politician
