= Vanderbilt University Law School =

Private law school in Nashville, Tennessee, US

Vanderbilt Law School
- Established: 1874
- School type: Private law school
- Endowment: $100 Million
- Parent endowment: $10.9 billion
- Dean: Chris Guthrie
- Location: Nashville, Tennessee, United States; 36.1480°N 86.8003°W
- Enrollment: 640
- Faculty: 154
- USNWR ranking: 12th (2026)
- Bar pass rate: 94.55% (Class of 2024)
- Website: law.vanderbilt.edu

Vanderbilt University Law School (also known as Vanderbilt Law, or VLS) is the law school of Vanderbilt University in Nashville, Tennessee, United States. Established in 1874, it is one of the oldest law schools in the southern United States. Vanderbilt Law enrolls approximately 650 students, with each entering Juris Doctor class ranging from 150 to 175 students.

According to Vanderbilt Law School's 2024 ABA-required disclosures, 93.97% of the Class of 2024 obtained full-time, long-term, bar examination passage-required employment nine months after graduation, excluding solo practitioners. The dean of the law school is Chris Guthrie, who began his fourth five-year appointment as dean on July 1, 2024.

== History ==
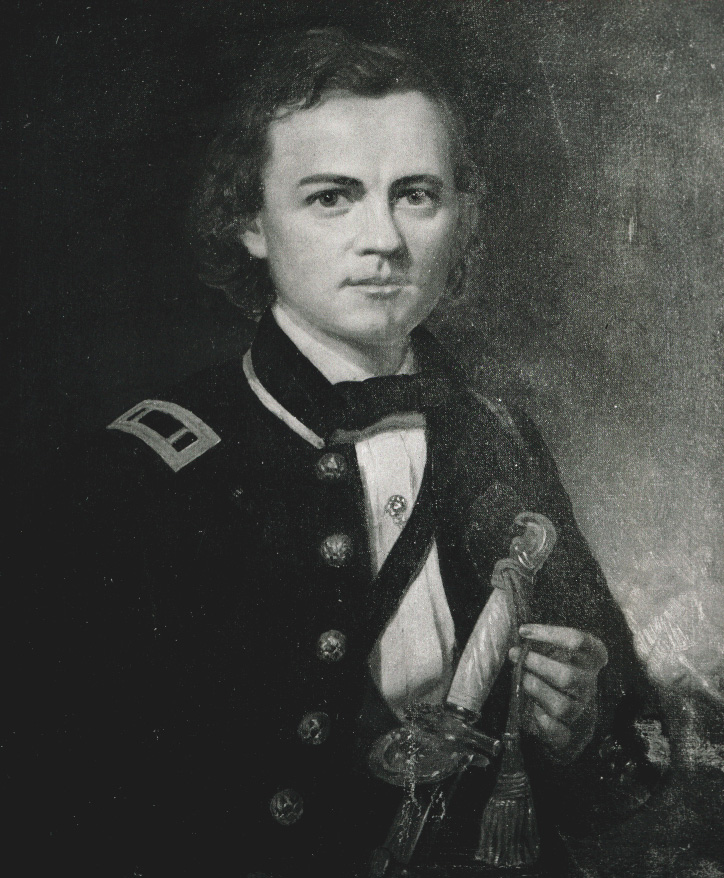
Thomas H. Malone, dean from 1875 to 1904.

Vanderbilt Law School was established in 1874, and was the first professional school to open (Vanderbilt University itself did not start its undergraduate classes until 1875). The law school's first class consisted of only seven students and eight professors, with a two-year course of study comprising the school's curriculum. William V. Sullivan was the school's first graduate and would eventually represent Mississippi in the United States Senate. William Frierson Cooper, who had been nominated by Jefferson Davis to serve on the Supreme Court of the Confederate States of America, served as the first dean from 1874 to 1875. He was succeeded by Thomas H. Malone, a veteran of the Confederate States Army, who served as dean from 1875 to 1904.

Through the late 19th and early 20th centuries, the law school remained small, never exceeding 70 students. The law school offered a two-year departmental program, and changed locations between downtown Nashville and the Vanderbilt campus. By 1941, it had expanded into the old chapel area of Kirkland Hall on the Vanderbilt campus, but faced very limited enrollment during World War II. Classes were suspended in 1944.

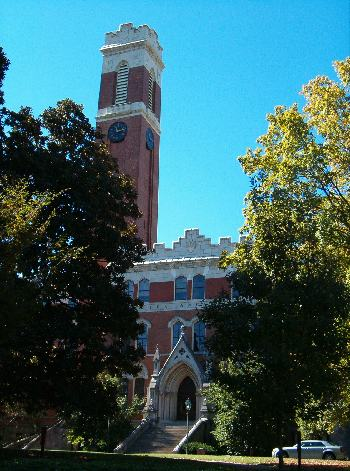
VLS was based in Kirkland Hall from 1944 to 1962.

Vanderbilt Law School was revived with a $1 million endowment in 1947 and experienced significant growth through the 1960s. Facing overcrowding, in 1962, it moved out of Kirkland Hall and into a dedicated law school building on 21st Avenue South, where it is still located.

Since then, Vanderbilt Law has undergone a series of renovations and expansion, notably including a $24 million upgrade under then-dean Kent D. Syverud completed in 2002.

By 2000, the law school had established a Law & Business Program, new clinical programs, multiple law journals, and an LL.M. program for foreign lawyers. At this point, Vanderbilt had greatly solidified its regional prestige and was well on its way to aggressively developing a national reputation.

In 2005, Edward L. Rubin was appointed to replace Syverud as dean of the law school. During Dean Rubin's tenure, Vanderbilt Law School significantly developed the Branstetter Litigation & Dispute Resolution Program (resulting from a $2.9 million endowment donation through a cy pres settlement of a class action lawsuit), established or formalized a number of academic programs, and increased its reputation in the field of Law and Economics by establishing a Ph.D. Program in Law & Economics based within the law school and headed by noted economist W. Kip Viscusi; students earn both a J.D. and a Ph.D. through the program.

Chris Guthrie succeeded Rubin as the law school's dean in July 2009. He has pursued a number of initiatives, prioritizing efforts to recruit and retain faculty, increase alumni involvement, and build upon the school's unique collegial culture.

In addition to the Law & Business and Branstetter Litigation & Dispute Resolution Programs, the law school now offers programs in Criminal Justice; Energy, Environment & Land Use, Social Justice (the George Barrett Social Justice Program); Intellectual Property; International Legal Studies; Law & Government; and Law & Innovation.

Vanderbilt Law also offers dual-degree programs in conjunction with other graduate schools at Vanderbilt University, including the Owen Graduate School of Management (J.D. / M.B.A. and J.D. / M.S. Finance), School of Medicine (J.D. / M.D.), Divinity School (J.D. / Master of Theological Studies, J.D. / Master of Divinity), and Peabody School (J.D. / Masters in Education Policy).

== Culture ==
The total enrollment of students pursuing either a Juris Doctor (J.D) or LL.M. is approximately 640. The program usually enrolls no more than 175 students to the J.D. class, and approximately 50 students to the LL.M class each year. VLS has more than 45 student organizations, which support many lectures, presentations and social events throughout the year. Students are also encouraged to form new organizations tailored to their personal interests, which has most recently produced Law Students for Social Justice (LSSJ), a new organization within the Social Justice Program that aims to facilitate an increasing number of students interested in pursuing public interest careers or hearing from legal practitioners on various ways to implement social justice values into their practice.

== Programs ==
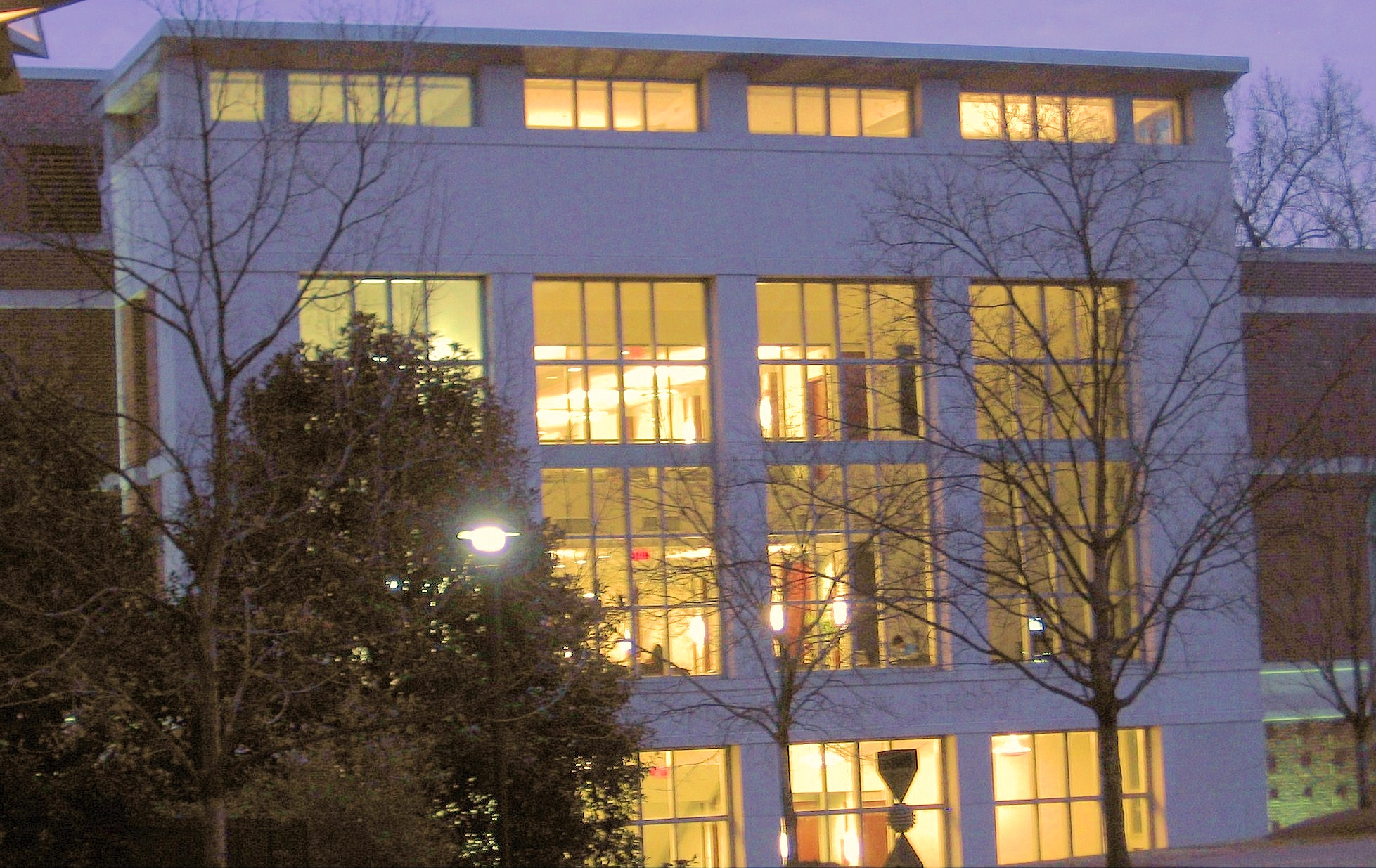
Vanderbilt University Law School Building, Nashville, Tenn.

Vanderbilt Law's upper-level concentration programs allow students to concentrate their studies in several fields. In addition to Law & Business and the Branstetter Litigation & Dispute Resolution Programs, the school also offers programs in Criminal Justice; Energy, Environment & Land Use, Social Justice (the George Barrett Social Justice Program); Intellectual Property; International Legal Studies; Law & Government; and Law & Innovation. The Law & Business program allows students to earn a certificate in Law & Business.

Vanderbilt Law also offers dual-degree programs in conjunction with other graduate schools at Vanderbilt University, including the Owen Graduate School of Management (J.D. / M.B.A. and J.D. / M.S. Finance), School of Medicine (J.D. / M.D.), Divinity School (J.D. / Master of Theological Studies, J.D. / Master of Divinity), and Peabody School (J.D. / Masters in Education Policy).

In fall 2011, Vanderbilt University received a $4.85 million grant from the John D. and Catherine T. MacArthur Foundation for the establishment of a national MacArthur Foundation Research Network on Law and Neuroscience.

Vanderbilt's Ph.D. Program in Law & Economics was the first program of its kind in the nation. The program, which is directed by economists W. Kip Viscusi and Joni Hersch, admitted its first class in fall 2007 and graduated its first student, Jennifer Bennett Shinall, in 2012. Shinall joined Vanderbilt's Law and Economics faculty in fall 2014.

In spring 2023, Vanderbilt Law launched the Weaver Family Program in Law, Brain Sciences, and Behavior, funded by a $3.85 million endowment from the Glenn M. Weaver Foundation, to sponsor faculty research aimed at exploring law and human behavior and host symposia and distinguished lectures featuring leading researchers working at the intersection of law, brain sciences, and behavior.

Vanderbilt Law School also offers a summer study program, Vanderbilt in Venice, which offers courses in comparative and international law. While classes in the program are held in Venice, Italy, the faculty include members of the Vanderbilt Law School faculty as well as faculty from the Ca' Foscari University of Venice. Past courses included Transnational Litigation, Counter-Terrorism Law, European Union Law, and Comparative Environmental Regulation.

== Post-graduation employment ==
According to Vanderbilt Law School's official 2024 ABA-required disclosures, 93.97% of the Class of 2024 obtained full-time, long-term, bar passage-required employment nine months after graduation, excluding solo-practitioners. Vanderbilt Law School ranked 14th out of the 194 ABA-approved law schools in terms of the percentage of 2024 graduates with non-school-funded, full-time, long-term, bar-passage-required jobs nine months after graduation.

Vanderbilt Law School's Law School Transparency under-employment score is 4.2%, indicating the percentage of the Class of 2024 unemployed, pursuing an additional degree, or working in a non-professional, short-term, or part-time job nine months after graduation. 98.2% of the Class of 2024 was employed in some capacity, while 0.6% were pursuing graduate degrees and 1.2% were unemployed nine months after graduation.

Vanderbilt Law School ranked 13th out of the 194 ABA-approved law schools in terms of percentage of 2024 graduates with full-time, long-term Federal Clerkships, with 9% of the Class of 2024 having secured such positions. In 2017 and in 2018, recent Vanderbilt Law graduates clerked for Justices Clarence Thomas and Sonia Sotomayor of the Supreme Court of the United States, respectively.

== Costs ==
The total estimated cost of attendance (indicating the cost of tuition, fees, and living expenses) at Vanderbilt Law for the 2025–26 academic year is $113,733.

The Law School Transparency estimated debt-financed cost of attendance for three years is $434,845.

== Publications ==
The Vanderbilt Law Review is ranked 13th among general-topic law reviews, based upon the number of times its articles are cited. The Vanderbilt Journal of Transnational Law, founded in 1967, is ranked 7th among international law reviews. The Vanderbilt Journal of Entertainment and Technology Law, founded as the Journal of Entertainment Law and Practice in 1998, is ranked 2nd among arts, entertainment, and sports law reviews and 7th among science, technology, and computing law reviews.

The Environmental Law and Policy Annual Review, a joint publication with the Environmental Law Institute, debuted in 2008. ELPAR is released each year as the August issue of the Environmental Law Reporter, one of the most widely circulated environmental law publications in the country.

The Vanderbilt Social Justice Reporter, founded in 2024, publishes scholarship presented through long-form articles, short essays, and opinion pieces, as well as contributions on current events and legal debates with direct and immediate policy relevance.

== Notable faculty ==
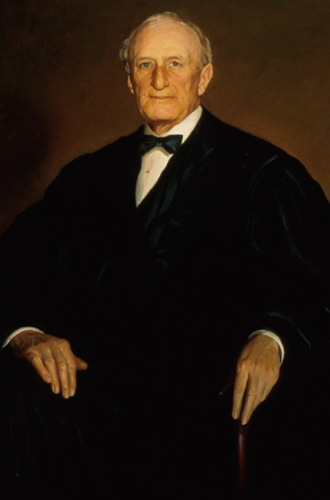
James Clark McReynolds

=== Current ===
- Lauren Benton, historian known for works on the history of empires, Nelson O. Tyrone Jr. Professor of History and Professor of Law
- James Blumstein, University Professor of Constitutional Law and Health Law and Policy
- Lisa Schultz Bressman, David Daniels Allen Distinguished Chair of Law, Professor of administrative law
- Ellen Wright Clayton, Professor of Law, leader in the field of law and genomics, 2013 David Rall Medal winner
- Brian T. Fitzpatrick, Professor of Law, Complex Litigation, Civil Procedure, Visiting professor at Harvard Law School
- Chris Guthrie, Dean, John Wade-Kent Syverud Professor of Law, expert on behavioral law and economics, dispute resolution, negotiation
- Kent A. Jordan, United States circuit judge of the United States Court of Appeals for the Third Circuit
- Terry Maroney, Professor of Medicine, Health and Society
- Michael A. Newton, Professor of the Practice of Law and Director of the International Legal Studies Program and International Law Practice Lab. He is an expert in terrorism, transnational justice, and international law and the author of over 100 books, articles, op-eds and book chapters.
- Jim Rossi, Associate Dean for Research, Judge D. L. Lansden Chair in Law, scholar of Energy Law and Administrative Law
- J. B. Ruhl, David Daniels Allen Distinguished Chair in Law, among the most cited U.S. academics in environmental law
- Paige Skiba, Professor of Law and Economics, and a leading scholar in the regulation of high-interest consumer loan industries
- Suzanna Sherry, author of numerous books on constitutional interpretive theory and casebooks on Civil Procedure and Federal Jurisdiction
- Ganesh Sitaraman, Professor of Law, Director, Program in Law and Government, Elizabeth Warren adviser, Center for American Progress senior Fellow
- W. Kip Viscusi, University Distinguished Professor of Law, Economics, and Management and the co-director of the Ph.D. Program in Law and Economics

=== Former ===
- Earl C. Arnold, author of Outlines of Suretyship and Guardianship, former Dean (1930–1945)
- Robert Barsky, Professor of Law, scholar of immigration and refugee law
- Rebecca Latham Brown, constitutional law theorist, former Allen Chair in Law
- Terry Calvani, anti-trust law scholar, former Commissioner of the U.S. Federal Trade Commission
- Jonathan Charney, former Lee S. and Charles A. Spier Professor, co-editor-in-chief of the American Journal of International Law
- William Frierson Cooper, nominated to serve on the Confederate Supreme Court by Jefferson Davis; first Dean from 1874 to 1875
- Anne Coughlin, expert in criminal law, criminal procedure, feminist jurisprudence and law and humanities
- Jacob M. Dickinson, Professor of Law (1897–99), United States Secretary of War (1909–1911)
- James W. Ely Jr., Milton R. Underwood Professor of Law Emeritus and Professor of History Emeritus, recipient of the Brigham–Kanner Property Rights Prize
- Barry E. Friedman, authority on constitutional law, policing, criminal procedure, and federal courts, working at the intersections of law, politics and history
- Jefferson B. Fordham, former professor of law, 9th Dean of the University of Pennsylvania Law School
- William Ray Forrester, former Dean, Constitutional Law scholar
- Joel Gerber, former Chief Justice of the United States Tax Court
- Horace Harmon Lurton (1844–1914), Associate Justice of the United States Supreme Court, Dean from 1905 until 1909
- Jacob M. Dickinson, 44th United States Secretary of War, Professor of Law from 1897 to 1899 while he was an attorney for the Louisville and Nashville Railroad
- Harold G. Maier, expert in Private International Law, International Civil Litigation (retired in 2006)
- Thomas H. Malone (1834–1906), Confederate veteran, judge, Dean of the Vanderbilt University Law School for two decades
- James Clark McReynolds (1862–1946), Associate Justice of the United States Supreme Court, served on the faculty before becoming part of President Theodore Roosevelt's Justice Department
- Vijay Padmanabhan, former attorney-adviser for the United States Department of State
- Lyman Ray Patterson, influential copyright scholar and historian, served as an assistant United States Attorney while teaching at Vanderbilt
- Robert K. Rasmussen, expert in bankruptcy and corporate reorganization, former Dean of the USC Gould School of Law
- Larry Soderquist, Professor of Law (1981–2005), director at Corporate and Securities Law Institute
- Kent Syverud, former Garner Anthony Professor of Law, expert on complex litigation, insurance law, and civil procedure
- Christopher Yoo, professor (1999–2007), former director of Vanderbilt's Technology and Entertainment Law Program, among the most frequently cited scholars of technology law, media law and copyright
