= D. L. Lansden =

American judge (1869–1924)

Dick Latta Lansden (May 16, 1869 – August 10, 1924) was a justice of the Tennessee Supreme Court from 1910 to 1923. He served as chief justice from 1918 to 1923.

Born in White County, Tennessee, Lansden attended the local public schools and then studied at Doyle College. He found work as a teacher and after a few years became the White County superintendent of schools, serving from 1891 to 1893. While working as a teacher and school superintendent, Lansden studied law under Judge E. Jarvis in Sparta, Tennessee. He was admitted to the bar in 1893 and immediately left his educational career to begin legal practice. On November 14, 1895, Lansden married Helen Snodgrass, the daughter of former U.S. Congressman H. C. Snodgrass.

Lansden served as Chancellor of the 4th Judicial Division in Tennessee from 1902 to 1910. In 1910, he was elected to the Tennessee Supreme Court, and in 1918 he was elected Chief Justice of the court.

In 1920, Lansden issued a judicial order that set aside an injunction anti-suffragists had secured from a trial judge to prohibit Tennessee's Governor from certifying the state's ratification of the Nineteenth Amendment to the U.S. Constitution, which gave women the right to vote. Justice Lansden's order broke a parliamentary logjam created by a lack of a legislative quorum (on a motion for reconsideration of the previous vote approving the amendment) and removed the final legal obstacle to Tennessee becoming the 36th and final state to ratify the Nineteenth Amendment.

Lansden served until his resignation from the court on April 11, 1923.

The Judge D. L. Lansden Chair in Law was established at Vanderbilt University Law School in 2018 through a trust established by his son, Dick L. Lansden Jr., and his wife Martha S. Lansden. The first person appointed to the position was Professor Jim Rossi in March 2019. Dick L. Lansden Jr. was a partner of the firm that became Waller Lansden Dortch & Davis, LLP, now one of the oldest firms in Tennessee.

Political offices
Preceded by Newly reconstituted court	Justice of the Tennessee Supreme Court; 1910–1923	Succeeded by William Loch Cook
