= Pedro Gonet Branco =

Brazilian legal scholar

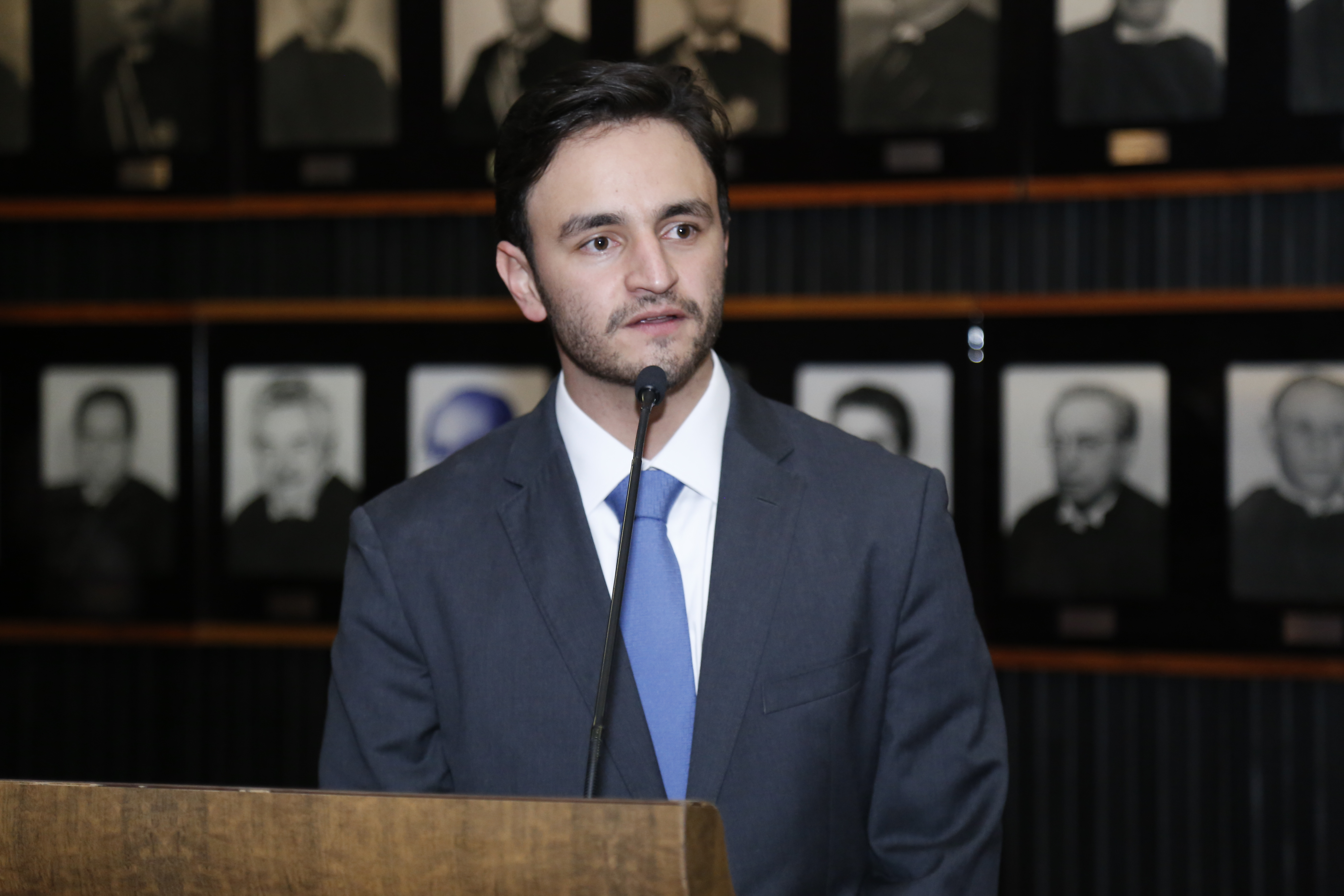
- Education: Universidade de Brasília; UC Berkeley

Pedro Gonet Branco is a Brazilian legal scholar who was one of the youngest scholars in the world to be cited by the Brazilian Supreme Federal Court, at the age of 20.

He stood out nationally for publishing opinion pieces in the newspaper O Estado de São Paulo about the relationship between Law and society.

He is also known for having produced and hosted the television Talk-Show Falando em Justiça, at TV Justiça.

== Activities ==
=== Opinion pieces ===
Pedro publishes monthly opinion articles at O Estado de São Paulo about law and its connection to different aspects of the life, such as its relationship with wine, music, the environment, health, the internet, business, politics, among others. He also writes for specialized law blogs.

=== Papers ===
Since he started law school at the University of Brasília, at the age of 18, Pedro has published scientific papers in national and international academic journals.

At the age of 20, still as a law student, he co-authored a paper about the regulation of the internet, that was used by the Supreme Federal Court to sustain the unconstitutionality of a consumer defense law, making Pedro one of the youngest academics in the world to be cited by the Supreme Court in a decision.

=== TV Justiça ===
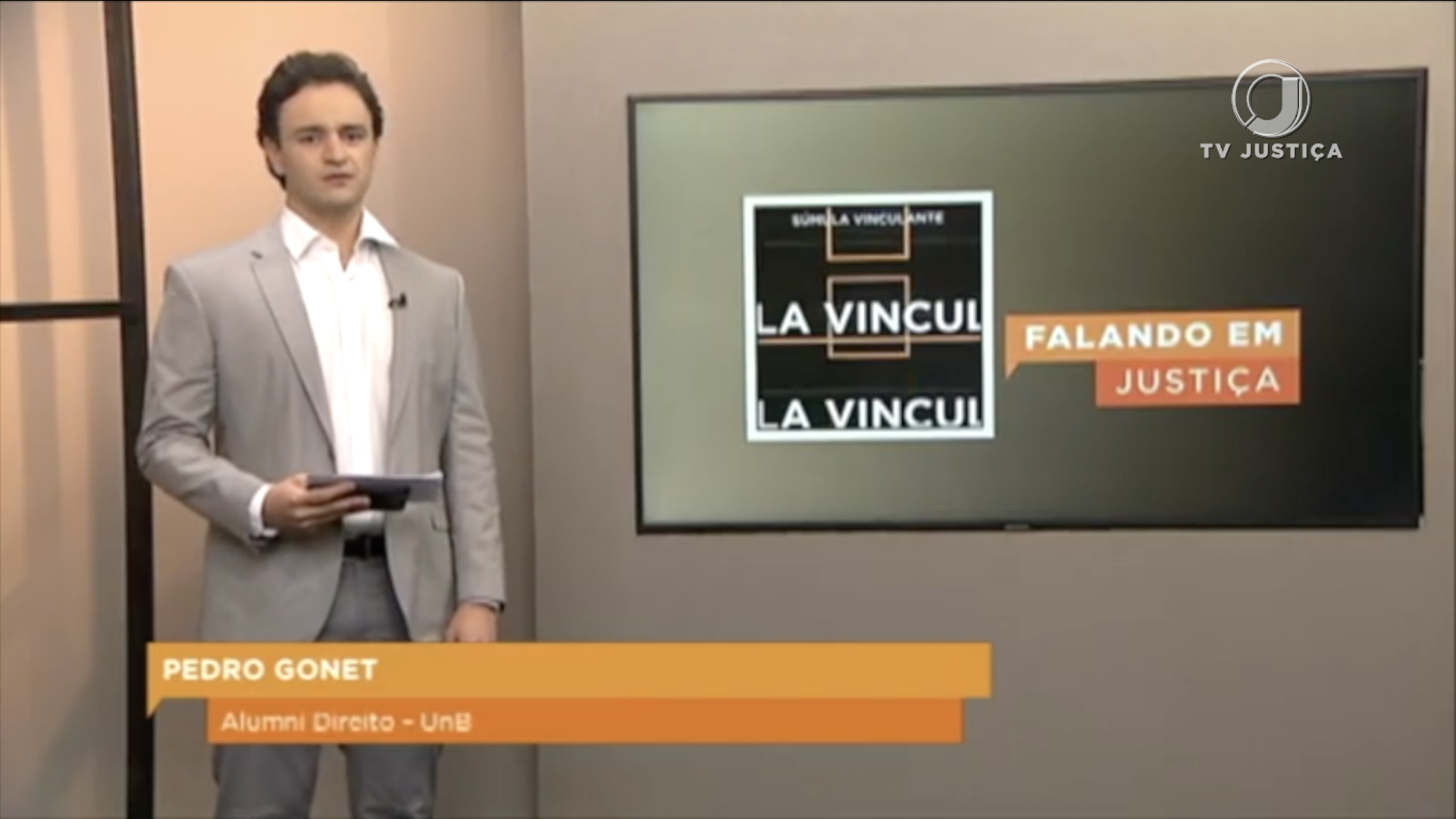
Pedro Gonet hosting Falando em Justiça

Pedro hosted and produced the TV Talking-Show Falando em Justiça, at TV Justiça, throughout 2020.

The program had prestige for bringing debates with legal scholars, political actors and other relevant people. Among the interviewees, he had the Supreme Federal Court Justice Gilmar Mendes, the philosopher Luiz Felipe Pondé, and the former State Minister Daniel Vargas.

=== Book "Elections and Democracy in the Digital Era" ===
Pedro organized the book "Elections and Democracy in the Digital Era", published in 2022, which brings the discussion of the interactions between technology, freedom of expression, elections and democracy. The book was defined by former Brazilian Chief Justice Carlos Velloso as providing "great services to nationality and democracy". The book ranked as the 20th best seller on Amazon Brazil.

=== Editor-in-Chief at the University of Brasilia Law Review ===
Pedro Gonet was the editor-in-chief of the University of Brasília Law Review (RED|UnB) from 2019 to 2022. During his time as editor-in-chief, the Law Review stood out as one of the main academic journals managed by Law Students in Brazil.

As editor-in-chief, Pedro published papers written by Supreme Court Chief Justice Luiz Fux, Supreme Court Justice Gilmar Mendes, Superior Court Judges Reynaldo Fonseca, Ives Gandra Filho, Regina Helena Costa, Maria Elizabeth Rocha, Rogerio Schietti Cruz, Bruno Dantas and Sérgio Banhos. He has also translated and published papers written by professors Mark Tushnet, Vicky Jackson, Terry Maroney, and Richard Albert.

In the events he organized as Editor-in-Chief, he had as guests the Supreme Court Justice Cármen Lúcia, the Chief Justice of Uruguay Eduardo Turell Apedrraquistain, the Vice President of the Brazilian Senate Antonio Anastasia, the Portuguese former Congressman Jorge Bacelar Gouveia, the former State Minister of Planning Esteves Colnago, the Secretary General of the Federal Senate Board Luiz Fernando Bandeira de Mello, the Deputy Attorney General Paulo Gonet Branco, the Judge of the Constitutional Court of Colombia Diego González, among others.

Pedro interviewed Data Protection authorities from different countries, such as the South African Pansy Tlakula, the German Ulrich Kelber, the Dutch Hielke Hijmans, and the Mexican Josefina Roman Vergara. He also interviewed the 300th Anniversary University Professor at Harvard University, who served as the Dean of Harvard Law School, Martha Minow.
