= Ellen Clayton =

Ellen Clayton may refer to:

- Ellen Wright Clayton, American professor of genetics
- Ellen Creathorne Clayton, author and artist
