= Robert MacCoun =

- Born: 18 October 1958
- Alma mater: Kalamazoo College; Michigan State University
- Occupation: Academic, university teacher, law professor, legal scholar
- Employer: RAND Corporation (1986–1993); Stanford University (2014–); University of California, Berkeley (1993–2014)
- Awards: James McKeen Cattell Fellow Award (2019)
- Website: law.stanford.edu/directory/robert-j-maccoun/

Robert J. MacCoun (born October 18, 1958) is the James and Patricia Kowal Professor of Law at Stanford Law School., a Professor by courtesy in Stanford's Psychology Department, and a senior fellow at the Freeman Spogli Institute. Trained as a social psychologist, he has published numerous studies on psychoactive drug use and policy, individual and group decision-making, distributive and procedural justice, social influence processes, and bias in the use and interpretation of research evidence by scientists, journalists and citizens.

In 2019, MacCoun received the James McKeen Cattell Fellow Award of the Association for Psychological Science, which “honors distinguished APS Members for a lifetime of outstanding contributions to applied psychological research.” He served as Editor of the Annual Review of Law and Social Science from 2018-2021.

MacCoun's publications include articles in Nature, 2015), Science (1989, 1997, and 2017), the New England Journal of Medicine (2015 and 2018), and Psychological Review (1996 and 2012), and many other academic journals, as well as essays in various newspapers and magazines. MacCoun's book with Peter Reuter, Drug War Heresies (Cambridge, 2001) is considered a landmark scholarly analysis of the drug legalization debate. MacCoun has also written extensively on the military's "Don't Ask, Don't Tell" policy, and his publications and expert testimony on military unit cohesion were influential in the 1993 and 2010 policy debates about allowing gays and lesbians to serve openly in the US military. His co-authored book with physicist Saul Perlmutter and philosopher John Campbell, Third Millennium Thinking: Creating Sense in a World of Nonsense, was published by Little, Brown Spark in 2024, and has appeared in British, Italian, German, Spanish, Portuguese, Chinese, and Japanese editions.

Prior to joining SLS in 2014, MacCoun was a member of the faculties of the Law School and the Goldman School of Public Policy at UC Berkeley from 1993 to 2014. From 1986 to 1993 he was a behavioral scientist at the RAND Corporation. In 1999, he came to Princeton University as a Visiting Professor to design and launch a graduate course on psychology and public policy with Daniel Kahneman and Eldar Shafir.
