= Carol Heimer =

American sociologist

- Born: 1951
- Education: University of Chicago, Reed College
- Occupation: Sociologist
- Employers: American Bar Foundation; Northwestern University
- Spouse: Arthur Stinchcombe

Carol Anne Heimer (born 1951) is Professor of Sociology Emerita at Northwestern University and a research professor at the American Bar Foundation. She is known for her research on the sociology of risk and responsibility, and on the connections between regulation, ethics, and law in medical practice. As of November 2023, Heimer became the editor of the Annual Review of Law and Social Science.

== Career and personal life ==
Heimer received her B.A. from Reed College (1973), and her M.A. (1976) and Ph.D. (1981) from the University of Chicago. Her dissertation committee included Charles Bidwell, Edward Laumann, Paul Hirsch, Donald Levine, and Michael Schudson. Her dissertation was later printed as Reactive Risk and Rational Action (1985).

Heimer married prominent sociologist Arthur Stinchcombe and with him co-authored the essay "Love and irrationality: It's got to be rational to love you because it makes me so happy" (1980) and the books Crime and punishment–changing attitudes in America (1980) and Organization theory and project management: administering uncertainty in Norwegian offshore oil (1985).

Heimer's book Reactive Risk and Rational Action (1985) examined issues of fixed risk and reactive risk and their implications for policy-making in all areas of social life. Her choice of insurance as a model that could have broader application was hailed as "brilliant" by reviewer Margaret Levi. The book was reprinted in 2020 as part of UC Press's Voices Revived program.

Heimer's book For the Sake of the Children (1998), co-authored with Lisa Staffen, examined the organization of neonatal intensive care units in United States hospitals. The book won awards from both the Theory Section and the Medical Sociology Section of the American Sociological Association.

Heimer has examined the delivery of AIDS drugs in clinics in South Africa, Uganda, Thailand and the United States. She writes extensively on the connections between health and law.

As of November 2023, Heimer became the editor of the Annual Review of Law and Social Science.

== Awards ==
- 1995: The Theory Section's Theory Prize, American Sociological Association. for "Doing Your Job and Helping Your Friends: Universalistic Norms about Obligations to Particular Others in Networks,” pp. 143–164 in Networks and Organization: Structure, Form and Action. Harvard Business School Press. 1995
- 2000, The Theory Section's Theory Prize, American Sociological Association, for For the Sake of the Children, with Lisa Staffen. University of Chicago Press, 1998.
- 2000, The Medical Sociology Section's Eliot Freidson Publication Award, American Sociological Association. for For the Sake of the Children, with Lisa Staffen. University of Chicago Press, 1998.
- 2002, Elected to membership, Sociological Research Association (SRA)

== Selected publications ==
=== Books ===
- Stinchcombe, Arthur L.; Heimer, Carol Anne (1985). Organization theory and project management: administering uncertainty in Norwegian offshore oil. Oslo: Norwegian Univ. Pr. ISBN 978-8200076001.
- Heimer, Carol A. (1985). Reactive Risk and Rational Action Managing Moral Hazard in Insurance Contracts. University of California Press. ISBN 9780520318458. Reprinted 2020.
- Heimer, Carol A.; Staffen, Lisa R. (1998). For the sake of the children: the social organization of responsibility in the hospital and the home. Chicago: Univ. of Chicago Press. ISBN 9780226325040.

=== Papers ===
- Heimer, Carol A. (1988). "Social Structure, Psychology, and the Estimation of Risk". Annual Review of Sociology. 14: 491–517. doi:10.1146/annurev.so.14.080188.002423.
- Heimer, Carol A. (1999). "Competing Institutions: Law, Medicine, and Family in Neonatal Intensive Care". Law & Society Review. 33 (1): 17–66. doi:10.2307/3115095. ISSN 0023-9216. JSTOR 3115095.
- Heimer, Carol A. (August 2001). "Cases and Biographies: An Essay on Routinization and the Nature of Comparison". Annual Review of Sociology. 27 (1): 47–76. doi:10.1146/annurev.soc.27.1.47. ISSN 0360-0572.
- Heimer, Carol A. (August 1, 2007). "Old Inequalities, New Disease: HIV/AIDS in Sub-Saharan Africa". Annual Review of Sociology. 33 (1): 551–577. doi:10.1146/annurev.soc.31.041304.122203. ISSN 0360-0572.
- Heimer, Carol A.; Petty, Juleigh (2010). "Bureaucratic Ethics: IRBs and the Legal Regulation of Human Subjects Research". Annual Review of Law and Social Science. 6: 601–626. doi:10.1146/annurev.lawsocsci.093008.131454.
- Petty, JuLeigh; Heimer, Carol A. (2011). "Extending the rails: How research reshapes clinics". Social Studies of Science. 41 (3): 337–360. doi:10.1177/0306312710396402. ISSN 0306-3127. JSTOR 41301936. PMID 21879525. S2CID 22809359.
- Heimer, Carol A. (February 1, 2012). "Inert facts and the illusion of knowledge: strategic uses of ignorance in HIV clinics". Economy and Society. 41 (1): 17–41. doi:10.1080/03085147.2011.637332. ISSN 0308-5147. S2CID 143777582.
- Heimer, Carol A. (December 1, 2013). "'Wicked' ethics: Compliance work and the practice of ethics in HIV research". Social Science & Medicine. 98: 371–378. doi:10.1016/j.socscimed.2012.10.030. ISSN 0277-9536. PMID 23312301.
- Heimer, Carol A.; Tolman, Arielle W. (December 2021). "Between the constitution and the clinic: Formal and de facto rights to healthcare". Law & Society Review. 55 (4): 563–586. doi:10.1111/lasr.12577. ISSN 0023-9216. S2CID 244931586.
- Heimer, Carol A.; Davis, Clay (October 18, 2022). "Good Law to Fight Bad Bugs: Legal Responses to Epidemics". Annual Review of Law and Social Science. 18 (1): 1–26. doi:10.1146/annurev-lawsocsci-050420-113513. ISSN 1550-3585.
