= Lucius E. Burch Jr. =

American lawyer

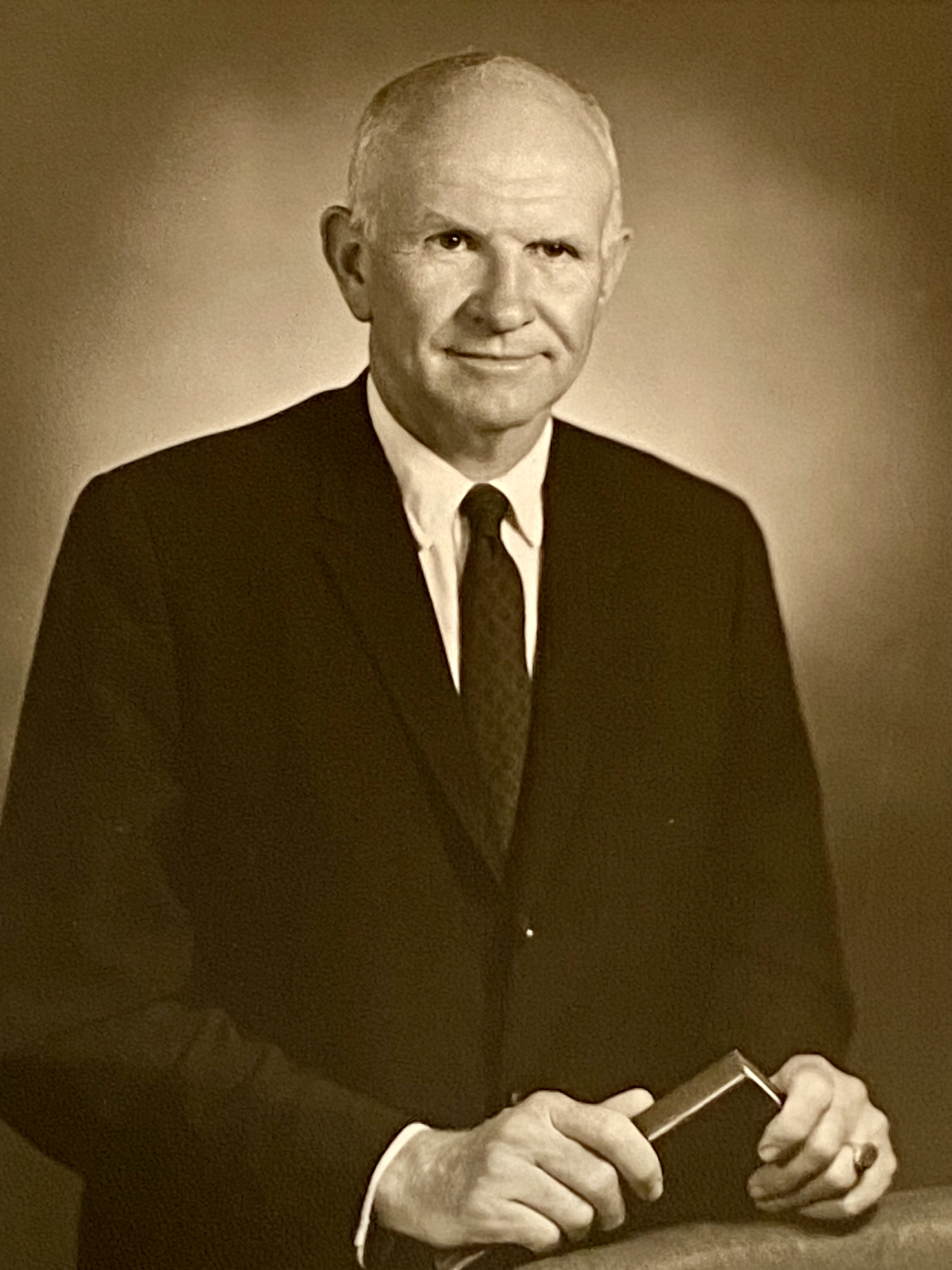
- Born: Lucius Edward Burch Jr. January 25, 1912; Nashville, Tennessee, U.S.
- Died: March 10, 1996 (aged 84); Memphis, Tennessee, U.S.
- Burial place: Mount Olivet Cemetery
- Education: Vanderbilt University
- Occupations: Lawyer, conservationist
- Political party: Democratic
- Spouse: Elsie Caldwell (m. 1935)
- Children: 4
- Parents: Lucius Edward Burch; Sarah Polk Cooper

Lucius Edward Burch Jr. (January 25, 1912 – March 10, 1996) was an American lawyer based in Memphis, Tennessee, best known for his contributions in the areas of conservation and civil rights and has been described as "the most liberal conscience in Memphis."

== Early life ==
Burch was born near Nashville, Tennessee, in 1912. His father, Dr. Lucius E. Burch, was the Dean of Vanderbilt University Medical School, and his mother was the former Sarah ("Sadie") Polk Cooper. The family's ancestry included U.S. presidents Andrew Jackson and James K. Polk, Nashville founder John Donelson, and Episcopal bishop and Confederate Army general Leonidas Polk. Burch spent much of his childhood at Riverwood, a Nashville mansion that belonged to his mother's family. He attended the Peabody Demonstration School (now University School of Nashville), graduating in 1930. After completing his undergraduate studies at Vanderbilt University, Burch enrolled at Vanderbilt University Law School, obtaining his law degree in 1936.

== Career ==
Burch joined the Memphis law firm of Burch, Minor and McKay, headed at the time by an uncle, Charles N. Burch. The firm's three senior partners died within the next few years and Burch inherited the firm's leadership. Together with new partners Jesse Johnson and John Porter, Burch was to lead the firm, now named Burch, Porter, and Johnson, for some fifty years.

Burch became one of the most active trial lawyers of his era, participating in many well-known trials. He was active in political affairs, opposing the Memphis political machine of E. H. Crump and supporting the civil rights movement. In 1968, he worked on behalf of Dr. Martin Luther King Jr. in a successful effort to lift a U.S. District Court injunction against a planned march in support of the striking workers in the Memphis sanitation strike.

Burch was a Fellow of the American College of Trial Lawyers and the American Bar Foundation. He served as Chairman of the Tennessee Game and Fish Commission, president of the Tennessee Conservation League, and a member of the Tennessee Democratic Executive Committee. A life member of the NAACP, he was also a founder, charter member, and president of the Memphis Community Relations Council.

== Writings ==
Burch wrote articles on diverse topics, ranging from hunting and fishing to civic affairs and politics. In 2003, a book of Burch's collected writings was published under the title Lucius: Writings of Lucius Burch. In 2007, Memphis Magazine named the book as one of "32 exceptional examples of literature by Memphians, about Memphis, or set in the city," saying of the book, "In the absence of a biography, this collection of his letters offers a glimpse into the mind and manners of this remarkable gentleman."

== Philanthropy ==
An avid outdoorsman and an amateur pilot, Burch traveled widely to engage in hunting, fishing, hiking, camping, and scuba-diving. As a young man, he worked in Alaska for the U.S. Biological Survey and the Territory of Alaska, shooting bald eagles, which were considered a nuisance. In later years, he was to become a strong supporter of wildlife conservation.

Late in his life, Burch was a leader of efforts to save the Shelby Farms area of Shelby County from development, a conservation initiative that culminated in the establishment of the Shelby Farms Park on 6,000 acres (2,400 ha). The Lucius E. Burch State Natural Area, a 728-acre (295 ha) state natural area within Shelby Farms Park, is now named in his honor. Among the awards that he received were the Carter Patten Award of the Tennessee Conservation League, the "Lawyer's Lawyer" Award of the Memphis and Shelby County Bar Association, the Certificate of Merit of the Memphis Urban League, an honorary doctorate from Rhodes College, and honorary life membership in the Tennessee Academy of Sciences.

== Personal life ==
Burch married Elsie Caldwell in 1935. The couple were the parents of four daughters. They resided in Collierville, Tennessee, and also maintained a summer cottage at Beersheba Springs that had belonged to Lucius' parents.

In the late 1990s, after her husband's death, Elsie Caldwell Burch donated $575,000 toward the construction of a new public library in Collierville. The library, completed in 2000, is named the Lucius E. Burch Jr. and Mrs. Elsie C. Burch Library in honor of the Burch donation.
