= Richard Hynes =

American molecular biologist (1944–2026)

Richard Hynes FRS
- Born: Richard Olding Hynes; 29 November 1944; Nairobi, Colony and Protectorate of Kenya
- Died: 6 January 2026 (aged 81)
- Citizenship: American; British
- Education: University of Cambridge (BA, MA); Massachusetts Institute of Technology (PhD)
- Known for: Cell adhesion research Discovery of fibronectin
- Awards: Canada Gairdner International Award; E.B. Wilson Medal; Robert J. and Claire Pasarow Foundation Medical Research Award; Albert Lasker Award for Basic Medical Research
- Scientific career
- Fields: Cell biology
- Workplaces: Massachusetts Institute of Technology; Howard Hughes Medical Institute; Broad Institute
- Thesis: Regulation of gene expression during early cleavage in sea urchin embryos (1971)
- Doctoral advisor: Paul R. Gross
- Doctoral students: Denisa Wagner

Richard Olding Hynes FRS (29 November 1944 – 6 January 2026) was a British biologist, who was a Howard Hughes Medical Institute Investigator, and the Daniel K. Ludwig Professor for Cancer Research at the Koch Institute for Integrative Cancer Research, Massachusetts Institute of Technology (MIT). His research focused on cell adhesion and the interactions between cells and the extracellular matrix, with a particular interest in understanding molecular mechanisms of cancer metastasis. Hynes is regarded as a co-discoverer of fibronectin molecules, a discovery that has been listed by Thomson Scientific ScienceWatch as a Nobel Prize candidate.

== Education ==
Hynes earned his B.A. in 1966 and M.A. in 1970 from the University of Cambridge, both in biochemistry. He received his Ph.D. in biology from the Massachusetts Institute of Technology in 1971. He worked as a postdoctoral fellow at the Imperial Cancer Research Fund from 1971 to 1974.

== Academic career ==
Hynes became a faculty member in the biology department at MIT in 1973 and was promoted to full professor in 1983. He was awarded Howard Hughes Medical Institute Investigator status in 1988. He served as the head of the biology department from 1989 to 1991 and as the director of the MIT Center for Cancer Research from 1991 to 2001, and became the Daniel K. Ludwig Professor for Cancer Research and affiliated with the Koch Institute for Integrative Cancer Research in 1999. In 2004 he became an associate member of the Broad Institute.

He served as the president of the American Society for Cell Biology in 2000. He was a member of the Board of Governors of the Wellcome Trust beginning in 2007. He also served on the Life Sciences jury for the Infosys Prize in 2012.

Hynes also published on public policy and participated in the development of United States research guidelines for stem cell research, particularly embryonic stem cells.

== Death ==
Hynes died on 6 January 2026, at the age of 81.

== Awards and honours ==
- Guggenheim Fellowship (1982)
- Fellow of the American Association for the Advancement of Science (1987)
- Fellow of the Royal Society (1989)
- Fellow of the American Academy of Arts and Sciences (1994)
- Member of the Institute of Medicine (now National Academy of Medicine) (1995)
- Member of the National Academy of Sciences (1996)
- Canada Gairdner International Award (1997)
- E.B. Wilson Medal (2007)
- Robert J. and Claire Pasarow Foundation Medical Research Award (2007)
- Fellow of the American Association for Cancer Research Academy (2014)
- Fellow of the American Society for Cell Biology (2016)
- David Rall Medal (2017)
- Albert Lasker Award for Basic Medical Research (2022)
