= Harold G. Maier =

American international law scholar (1937–2014)

- Born: March 25, 1937; Cincinnati, Ohio, U.S.
- Died: August 24, 2014 (aged 77)

Academic background
- Education: University of Cincinnati; University of Cincinnati College of Law (JD); University of Michigan (LL.M.)

Harold G. Maier (March 25, 1937 – August 24, 2014) was an American scholar in the field of international law, international civil litigation, and conflict of laws. After receiving his undergraduate education at the University of Cincinnati, he obtained his Juris Doctor degree from the University of Cincinnati College of Law. He also earned an LL.M. from the University of Michigan. He held the title of David Daniels Allen Professor of Law Emeritus at Vanderbilt University Law School.

In addition to being a prolific author, Maier has served as Counselor on International Law to the Legal Adviser at the U.S. Department of State, as a member of the U.S. Secretary of State's Advisory Committee on Private International Law, and as a consultant to the Office of the Secretary of the Army on the Panama Canal Treaty Negotiations. Additionally, he has testified before congressional committees on various issues, including emergency presidential controls on international economic transactions. In 1985 he was an expert witness for the U.S. Government in civil litigation resulting from the Mariel boatlift.

At Vanderbilt, he established the law school's Transnational Studies Program as well as the Vanderbilt Journal of Transnational Law.

Maier died on August 24, 2014, at the age of 77.
