= William Loch Cook =

American judge (1869–1942)

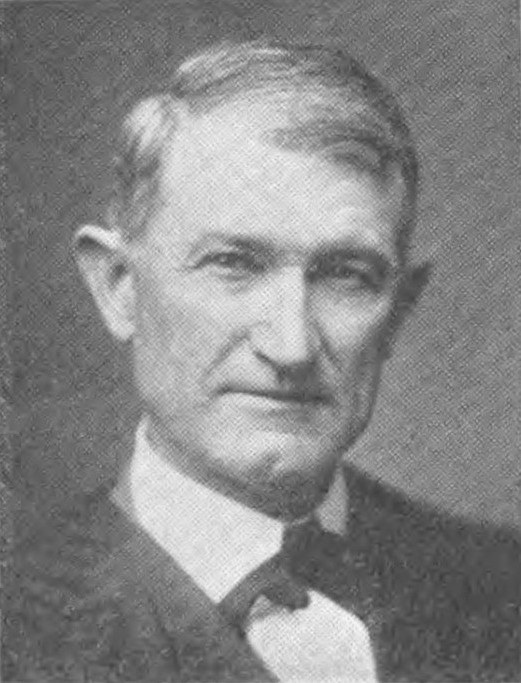
William L. Cook

William Loch Cook (December 6, 1869 – March 5, 1942) was an associate justice of the Tennessee Supreme Court from 1923 to 1942.

Cook was born on December 6, 1869 in Bon Aqua, Hickman County, Tennessee, the son of William Cook and his wife Elizabeth Weems. He was raised in Montgomery County and received his early education in Montgomery and Dickson Counties. Cook studied in the law department of Vanderbilt University and then completed his legal training in the office of T. C. Morris in Charlotte, Tennessee. In 1892, he was admitted to the bar in Charlotte and began to practice law both there and in Nashville.

Cook served in the Tennessee House of Representatives for Dickson County in the 50th General Assembly from 1897 to 1898 as a Democrat. In 1908, he was elected to a seat on the Tennessee Ninth Judicial Circuit, where he remained until 1923, when Governor Austin Peay appointed Cook to a seat on the Tennessee Supreme Court vacated by the resignation of Justice D. L. Lansden. Cook died on March 5, 1942 in Charlotte and was interred at Collier Cemetery there.

Political offices
Preceded by D. L. Lansden	Justice of the Tennessee Supreme Court; 1923–1942	Succeeded by A. B. Neil
