= Joseph S. Fowler =

American politician

Joseph Smith Fowler
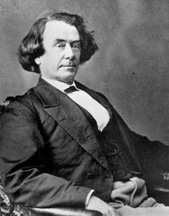

United States Senator from Tennessee
- In office July 24, 1866 – March 3, 1871
- Preceded by: Alfred O. P. Nicholson
- Succeeded by: Henry Cooper

Tennessee Comptroller of the Treasury
- In office May, 1862 – May 1865
- Preceded by: James T. Dunlap
- Succeeded by: Samuel W. Hatchett

Personal details
- Born: August 31, 1820 Steubenville, Ohio
- Died: April 1, 1902 (aged 81) Washington, D.C.
- Resting place: Lexington Cemetery, Lexington, Kentucky
- Party: Republican
- Education: Franklin College, New Athens, Ohio
- Profession: Attorney

Joseph Smith Fowler (August 31, 1820 – April 1, 1902) was an American attorney and politician. As a resident of Tennessee, he was notable for his support of the Union during the American Civil War. Fowler served as state comptroller during the military governorship of Andrew Johnson. After the war, Fowler served as a United States Senator from Tennessee from 1866 to 1871.

== Early life ==
Fowler was born in Steubenville, Ohio on August 31, 1820, a son of James and Sarah (Atkinson) Fowler, natives of Maryland and Virginia respectively. He graduated from Steubenville's Grove Academy attended Franklin College in New Athens, Ohio, from which he graduated in 1843. He taught school in Shelby County, Kentucky in 1844 and was a professor of mathematics at Franklin College in Davidson County, Tennessee from 1845 to 1849. He studied law in Bowling Green, Kentucky, was admitted to the bar, and practiced in Tennessee until 1861. From 1856 to 1861 he served as president of Howard Female College in Gallatin, Tennessee.

== Civil War ==
Fowler was an ardent Unionist and at the start of the American Civil War he moved his family to Springfield, Illinois. He returned to Tennessee when a pro-Union government was established. From 1862 to 1865, Fowler served as Tennessee's state comptroller, holding office during the military governorship of Andrew Johnson.

== United States Senator ==
In 1866, Tennessee became the first former Confederate state to be readmitted to the Union; the Tennessee General Assembly elected Fowler to the Senate, where his service began on July 24, 1866. Fowler became a part of the majority Republican caucus. In the 40th Congress he served as chairman of the Committee on Engrossed Bills. He was one of 13 senators, and one of five Republican senators, to oppose the Fifteenth Amendment to the United States Constitution.

=== Impeachment trial of Andrew Johnson ===
During President Andrew Johnson's impeachment trial, Fowler broke party ranks, along with nine other Republican senators, and voted for acquittal. Including Fowler, seven Republican senators were disturbed by how the proceedings had been manipulated in order to give a one-sided presentation of the evidence. The other Republican senators expressing these concerns were William Pitt Fessenden James W. Grimes, John B. Henderson, Lyman Trumbull, Peter G. Van Winkle, and Edmund G. Ross of Kansas, who provided the decisive vote. Together, with three other Republican Senators (James Dixon, James Rood Doolittle, Daniel Sheldon Norton) they all defied their party and public opinion and voted against convicting Johnson. After the trial, Congressman Benjamin Butler conducted hearings on the widespread reports that Republican senators had been bribed to vote for Johnson's acquittal. In Butler's hearings, and in subsequent inquiries, there was increasing evidence that some acquittal votes were acquired by promises of patronage jobs and cash.

== Later life ==
Fowler was not a candidate for reelection, and left the Senate at the end of his term in 1871. He returned to Tennessee, and practiced law in Nashville. In 1872, he was active in the Liberal Republican Party, and was a delegate to its national convention. In 1875, Fowler was selected by the committee planning the public memorial in Nashville that commemorated Andrew Johnson's death to deliver the funeral oration. In 1878, Fowler moved to Washington, D.C., where he practiced law until shortly before his death. Fowler also authored articles for The Magazine of American History and other publications.

== Death and burial ==
Fowler died in Washington on April 1, 1902. He was buried at Lexington Cemetery in Lexington, Kentucky.

== Family ==
On November 12, 1846, Fowler married Maria Louisa Embry (1827-1866). They were the parents of two children, Louisa Fowler (1849-1889) and James Bowling Fowler (1859-1887).

== Legacy ==
A collection of Fowler's papers is maintained by the Tennessee State Library and Archives.

U.S. Senate
Preceded by American Civil War (vacancy), previously Alfred O.P. Nicholson	U.S. senator (Class 2) from Tennessee; 1866–1871; Served alongside: David T. Patterson, William G. Brownlow	Succeeded by Henry Cooper
