= Stuart Bondurant =

UNC School of Medicine professor

Stuart O. Bondurant FRCPE (September 9, 1929 – May 26, 2018) was professor and dean emeritus at the UNC School of Medicine in Chapel Hill, North Carolina. As dean, he was noted for his efforts to expand the university's hospital system, and for leading improvements in the school's curriculum. In particular, he is recognized for his efforts to reduce infant mortality in North Carolina in his capacity as chair of the Governor's Commission on the Reduction of Infant Mortality.

== Education ==
A native of Winston-Salem, North Carolina, Bondurant received a B.S. in medicine from the University of North Carolina at Chapel Hill in 1952, followed by a medical degree from Duke University in 1953.

== Career ==
Bondurant served as dean of the UNC School of Medicine from 1979 to 1994, and served as the school's interim dean from 1996 to 1997. He was also a co-founder of the North Carolina Institute of Medicine, and served as vice chair of its board of directors from 1984 to 2005. From 1989 to 1996, he was chair of the Governor's Commission on the Reduction of Infant Mortality.

== Professional affiliations ==
Bondurant has served as president of the American College of Physicians, chair of the Association of American Medical Colleges, and president of the National Academy of Medicine (then known as the Institute of Medicine).

== Awards and recognition ==
In 1980, Bondurant received an honorary D.S. degree from Indiana University. In 1998, he received the Thomas Jefferson Award from UNC-Chapel Hill's Office of Faculty Governance. In 2000, he was the first recipient of the National Academy of Medicine's David Rall Medal. In 2006, UNC School of Medicine dedicated Bondurant Hall (formerly known as the Medical Sciences Research Building) in his honor. His other awards include a Citation for Distinguished Service to Research and an Award of Merit from the American Heart Association, as well as a Distinguished Alumnus Award from the Duke University School of Medicine.
