= Earl C. Arnold =

American academic administrator

- Born: June 8, 1884; Iola, Kansas, U.S.
- Died: November 21, 1949 (aged 65); Nashville, Tennessee, U.S.
- Education: Baker University; Northwestern University Pritzker School of Law

Earl Caspar Arnold (8 June 1884 – 21 November 1949) was an American academic administrator. He served as the dean of the Vanderbilt University Law School from 1930 to 1945.

== Early life ==
Arnold was born on 8 June 1884 in Iola, Kansas. He graduated from Baker University in 1906, and he earned a JD from the Northwestern University Pritzker School of Law in 1909.

== Career ==
Arnold was a Law professor at the University of Idaho, the University of Florida, the University of Cincinnati and George Washington University. He was the dean of the Vanderbilt University Law School from 1930 to 1945.

Arnold authored Outlines of Suretyship and Guardianship.

== Personal life and death ==
Arnold married Susan Vaughan. They had a son and a daughter. They resided on Rosemont Avenue in Nashville. He was a member of the Cosmos Club. At the time of his death, they were building a house in Montgomery County, Tennessee.

Arnold died on November 21, 1949, at Mid-State Baptist Hospital in Nashville. His funeral was held at the West End United Methodist Church in Nashville, and he was buried in Iola, Kansas.
