= Henry Cooper (Tennessee politician) =

American politician

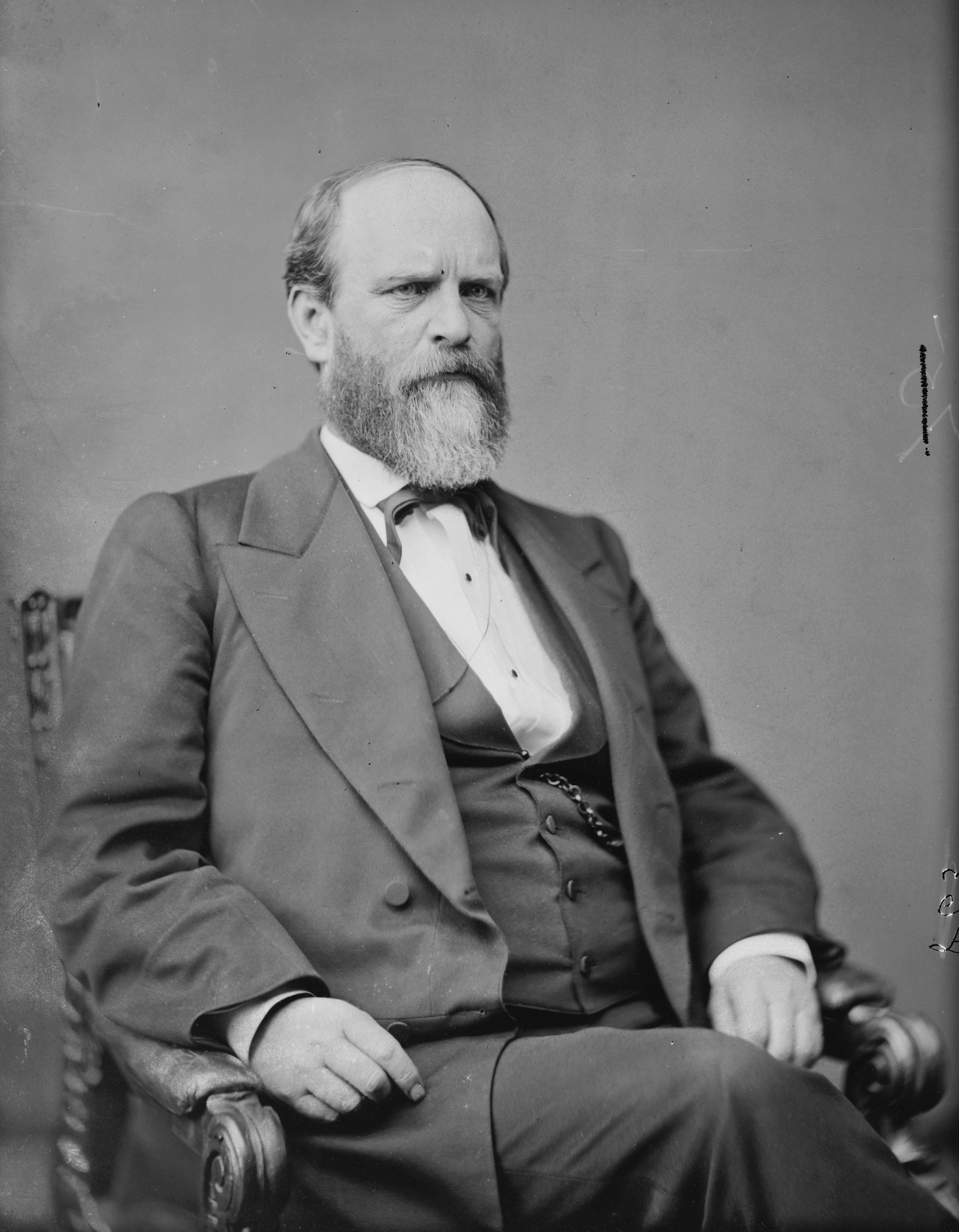

United States Senator from Tennessee
- In office March 4, 1871 – March 3, 1877
- Preceded by: Joseph S. Fowler
- Succeeded by: Isham G. Harris

Member of the Tennessee House of Representatives
- In office 1853–1855; 1857–1859

Personal details
- Born: August 22, 1827 Columbia, Tennessee, US
- Died: February 4, 1884 (aged 56) Tierra Blanca, Guadalupe y Calvo, Chihuahua, Mexico
- Party: Democratic

Henry Cooper (August 22, 1827 – February 4, 1884) was a Tennessee attorney, judge, and politician who served one term in the United States Senate, 1871–1877. During his career, Cooper had various political affiliations, including Whig, Know Nothing, and Democrat.

== Early life ==
Henry Cooper was born on August 22, 1827, in Columbia, Tennessee. He had three brothers, including William Frierson Cooper and Edmund Cooper, and two half-brothers, including Duncan Brown Cooper.

Cooper attended Dixon Academy in Shelbyville, Tennessee, and graduated from Jackson College in Jackson, Tennessee, in 1847. He studied law and was admitted to the bar in 1850.

== Political career ==
Cooper served as a member of the Tennessee House of Representatives from 1853 to 1855 and again from 1857 to 1859. He was appointed judge of the former 7th Judicial Circuit in April, 1862. In January, 1866 he resigned this position and moved to Lebanon, Tennessee, where he became a professor at the Cumberland School of Law. In 1867 he moved to Nashville, where he served in the Tennessee State Senate, 1869-1870.

The Tennessee General Assembly elected him to the United States Senate for the term beginning March 4, 1871. He did not seek another term, and his Senate service ended on March 3, 1877.

== Mining career and death ==
By the early 1880s, he was engaged in mining operations in Tierra Blanca, Guadalupe y Calvo, Chihuahua, Mexico.

Cooper was murdered there by bandits on February 4, 1884. He was buried nearby, and a cenotaph to his memory was erected at Old City Cemetery in Shelbyville, Tennessee.

== Sources ==
- United States Congress. "Henry Cooper (id: C000751)". Biographical Directory of the United States Congress.
- Henry Cooper at The Political Graveyard

U.S. Senate
Preceded by Joseph S. Fowler	U.S. senator (Class 2) from Tennessee; March 4, 1871 – March 3, 1877; Served alongside: William Gannaway Brownlow, Andrew Johnson, David M. Key and James E. Bailey	Succeeded by Isham G. Harris
