= Denisa Wagner =

American biologist

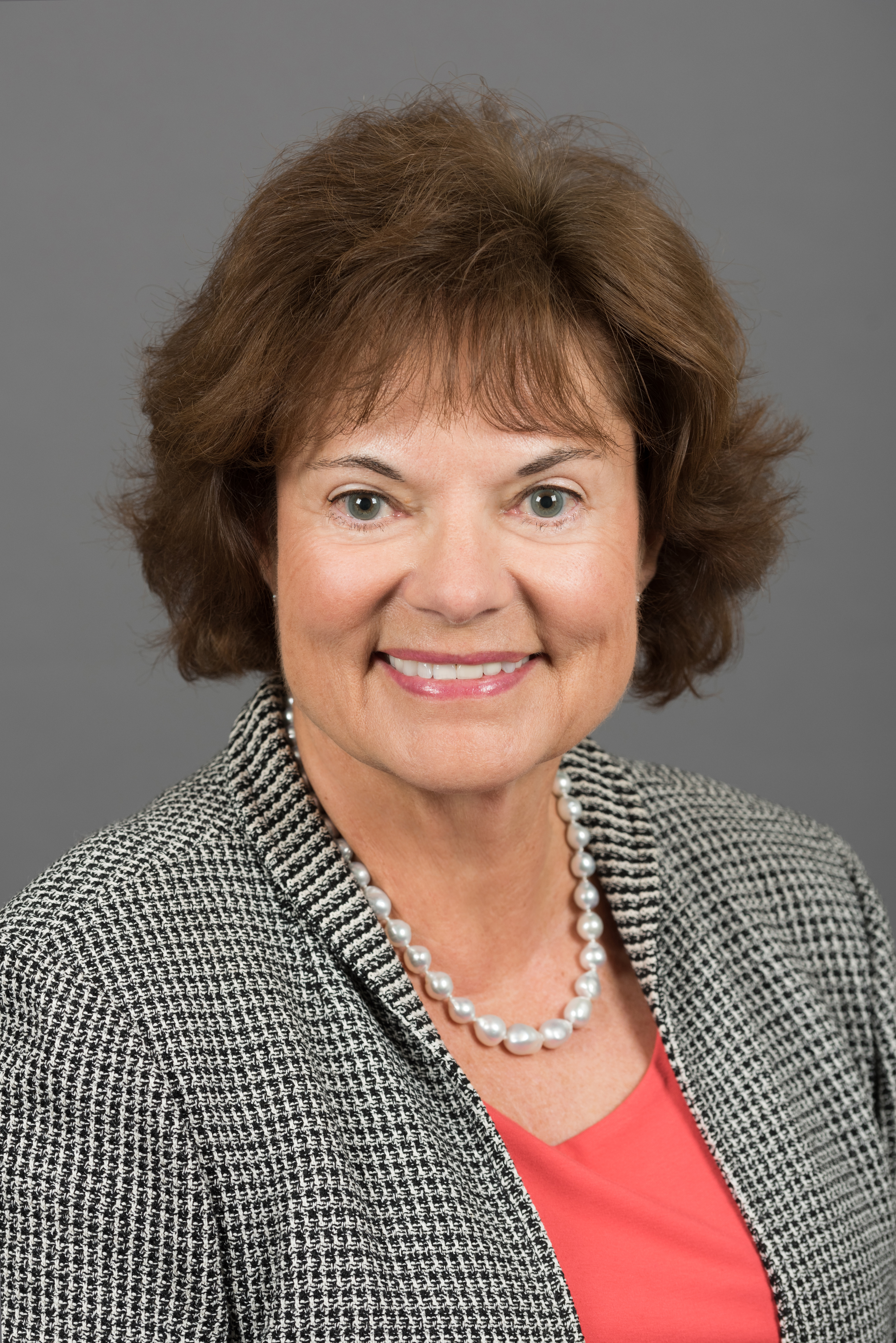
- Born: Prague, Czechoslovakia
- Education: Université de Geneve, Switzerland; Massachusetts Institute of Technology, Cambridge, MA; Harvard University, Cambridge, MA
- Awards: International Society on Thrombosis and Haemostasis, Robert P. Grant Medal (2015); American Heart Association’s Distinguished Scientist Award (2017); American Heart Association's Russell Ross Memorial Lectureship in Vascular Biology (2021); American Society of Hematology, Henry B. Stratton Medal in Basic Science (2021)
- Scientific career
- Thesis: (1980)
- Doctoral advisor: Richard O. Hynes

Denisa D. Wagner is an American biologist currently the Edwin Cohn Professor of Pediatrics at Boston Children's Hospital (BCH), Harvard Medical School. Wagner first arrived in the United States in 1975 as a refugee from Czechoslovakia. She received her PhD in Biology from the Massachusetts Institute of Technology (MIT) and taught at the University of Rochester and Tufts University before joining the Harvard faculty in 1994. Prior to this, Wagner studied at the University of Geneva, where she received her undergraduate degree in biochemistry.

== Career ==
While attending MIT, Wagner started to work at the Center for Cancer Research. After graduating, Wagner started a post doc with Dr Joanna Olmsted at the University of Rochester. Later on, Dr Fred Rosen a physician at Boston Children's Hospital approached Wagner after several high profile papers came out. He offered Wagner a position, at the time she had 3 jobs offers.

== Work ==
The Wagner Lab contributes in the fields of vascular biology, inflammation, and thrombosis. Her Lab focuses on how blood cells and endothelial cells respond to vascular injury. Also her lab has been studying NETs (Neutrophil Extracellular Traps) for more than a decade. In 2015, research from the lab shed light on healing wounds in patients with diabetes. In the same year she received the Robert P. Grant Medal, which is the highest award of the International Society on Thrombosis and Hemostasis (ISTH).

== Accomplishments ==
Wagner is an Elected Fellow of the American Association for the Advancement of Science. In 2017, the American Heart Association honored her as one of the year's Distinguished Scientists and in 2021, she delivered the Russell Ross Memorial Lectureship in Vascular Biology. In 2021, Wagner received the Henry B. Stratton Medal in Basic Science from the American Society of Hematology. Wagner is widely published, with almost 70,000 citations and an h-index of 144.

== Selected publications ==
Denisa D. Wagner has published more than 100 scientific articles.

- Neutrophil extracellular traps promote deep vein thrombosis in mice A Brill, TA Fuchs, AS Savchenko, GM Thomas, K Martinod, SF De Meyer, ...Journal of Thrombosis and Haemostasis 10 (1), 136-144
- Cell biology of von Willebrand factor DD Wagner Annual review of cell biology 6 (1), 217-242
- Cancers predispose neutrophils to release extracellular DNA traps that contribute to cancer-associated thrombosis M Demers, DS Krause, D Schatzberg, K Martinod, JR Voorhees, TA Fuchs, ... Proceedings of the National Academy of Sciences 109 (32), 13076-13081
- Platelets in inflammation and thrombosis DD Wagner, PC Burger Arteriosclerosis, thrombosis, and vascular biology 23 (12), 2131-2137
- Leukocyte rolling and extravasation are severely compromised in P selectin-deficient mice TN Mayadas, RC Johnson, H Rayburn, RO Hynes, DD Wagner Cell 74 (3), 541-554
