= Jonathan Charney =

American academic (1943–2002)

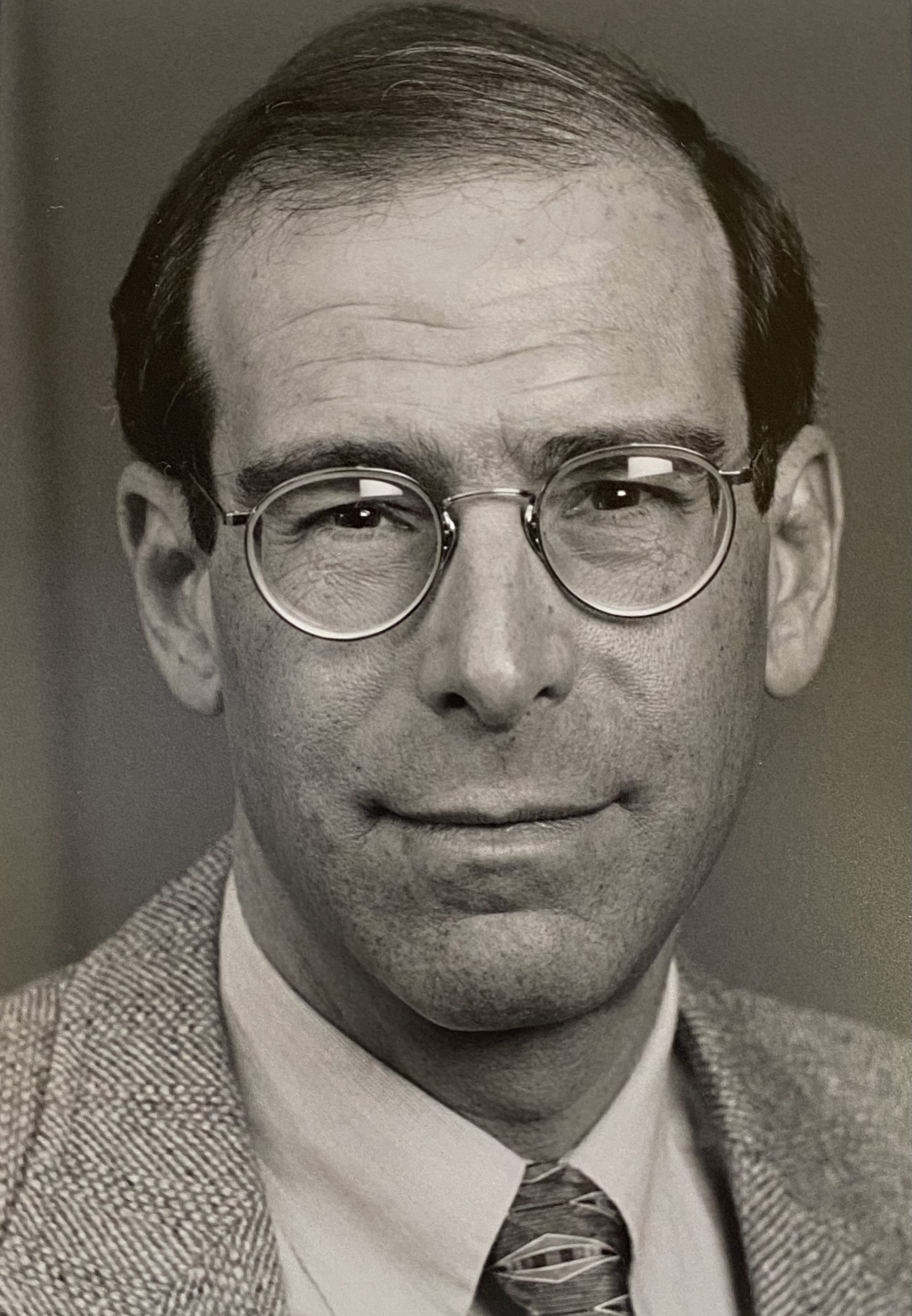

Jonathan I. Charney (1943 – September 7, 2002) was an American academic, author, lawyer and the Lee S. and Charles A. Spier Professor at Vanderbilt University School of Law in Nashville, Tennessee. He was also co-editor-in-chief of the American Journal of International Law.

== Early life ==
Charney earned his BA in 1965 from New York University. His JD was awarded by the University of Wisconsin School of Law.

== Career ==
Charney joined the faculty of Vanderbilt Law School in 1972.

In addition to his academic career, he was a member of the US delegation which negotiated the United Nations Convention on the Law of the Sea in 1982. Charney was a member of the US delegation at the Third United Nations Conference on the Law of the Sea (UNCLOSIII); and he served on the US Advisory Committee on the Law of the Sea.

== Selected works ==
In a statistical overview derived from writings by and about Jonathan Charney, OCLC/WorldCat encompasses roughly 50+ works in 70+ publications in 5 languages and 800+ library holdings.

- The New nationalism and the use of common spaces: issues in marine pollution and the exploitation of Antarctica (1981)
- International maritime boundaries (1996)
- Politics, values, and functions: international law in the 21st century: essays in honor of Professor Louis Henkin (1997)
- Politics, values and functions (1998)
- La contribution de l'académie au développement de la science et de la pratique du droit international privé (The contribution of the academy to the development of the science and practice of public international law) (1999)
- Conférences prononcées à l'occasion du soixante-quinzième anniversaire de l'Académie (Addresses delivered on the occasion of the 75th anniversary of the Academy by A.V.M Struycken) (1999)

== Honors ==
- American Society of International Law, Certificate of Merit, 1993.
