= Arthur Stinchcombe =

American sociologist (1933–2018)

- Born: Arthur Leonard Stinchcombe; May 16, 1933; Clare County, Michigan, U.S.
- Died: July 3, 2018 (aged 85)
- Spouse: Carol Heimer

Academic background
- Education: Central Michigan University; University of California, Berkeley
- Thesis: Social Sources of Rebellion in a High School (1960)

Academic work
- Discipline: Sociology
- Sub-discipline: Economic sociology; historical sociology; legal sociology; organizational sociology
- Institutions: Johns Hopkins University; University of California, Berkeley; University of Chicago; University of Arizona; Northwestern University
- Doctoral students: John R. Logan; Erik Olin Wright

Arthur Leonard Stinchcombe (May 16, 1933 – July 3, 2018) was an American sociologist. Stinchcombe was born on May 16, 1933, in Clare County, Michigan, and attended Central Michigan University, where he earned a bachelor's degree in mathematics. He then pursued graduate study in sociology at the University of California, Berkeley, earning a doctorate.

Stinchcombe began his teaching career at Johns Hopkins University before returning to Berkeley from 1967 to 1975. He then left for the University of Chicago, followed by a stint at the University of Arizona.

Stinchcombe joined the Northwestern University faculty in 1983 and was named John Evans Professor of Sociology in 1990. He retired in 1995. Stinchcombe died on July 3, 2018.

== Awards ==
Over the course of his career, Stinchcombe was granted fellowship by the American Academy of Arts and Sciences (1977), and National Academy of Sciences (2003). He was awarded a Guggenheim Fellowship in 1991.

== Academic research ==
Stinchcombe's most cited work, "Social Structure and Organizations" (1965), is a study of the relation of the society outside organizations to the internal life of organizations. The work proposes that “social structure” be understood as "any variables which are stable characteristics of the society outside the organization". It suggests that “organization” be understood as "a set of stable social relations deliberately created, with the explicit intention of continuously accomplishing some specific goals or purposes". This work is seen as an important contribution to organizational theory.

Another field to which Stinchcombe contributed was critical juncture theory. Stinchcombe elaborated the idea of historical causes (such as critical junctures) as a distinct kind of cause that generates a "self-replicating causal loop." Stinchcombe explained that the distinctive feature of such a loop is that "an effect created by causes at some previous period becomes a cause of that same effect in succeeding periods."

Stinchcombe is also credited with contributing to the revival of economic sociology.

== Major works ==
- Arthur L Stinchcombe, "Social Structure and Organizations," pp. 142–193, in James G March (ed.), Handbook of Organizations. Chicago: Rand McNally, 1965.
- Arthur L Stinchcombe, Constructing Social Theories. New York, NY: Harcourt, Brace, and World, 1968.
- Arthur L Stinchcombe, Theoretical Methods in Social History. New York, NY: Academic Press, 1978.
- Arthur L Stinchcombe, Economic Sociology. New York: Academic Press, 1983.
- Arthur L Stinchcombe, Information and Organizations. Berkeley: University of California Press, 1990.
- Arthur L Stinchcombe, Sugar Island Slavery in the Age of Enlightenment: the Political Economy of the Caribbean World. Princeton: Princeton University Press, 1995.
- Arthur L Stinchcombe, When Formality Works: Authority and Abstraction in Law and Organizations. Chicago: University of Chicago Press, 2001.
- Arthur L Stinchcombe, The Logic of Social Research. Chicago: University of Chicago Press, 2005.

== See also ==
- Critical juncture theory
- Economic sociology
- Organizational theory

Awards
Preceded by Immanuel Wallerstein	W.E.B. Du Bois Career of Distinguished Scholarship Award; 2004	Succeeded by Charles Tilly
Preceded by Immanuel Wallerstein	W.E.B. Du Bois Career of Distinguished Scholarship Award; 2004	Succeeded by Charles V. Willie
