= Osagie Obasogie =

American bioethicist and law professor

Osagie K. Obasogie
- Born: Osagie Kingsley Obasogie; August 21, 1977 (age 49); Ohio, USA
- Education: Yale University; Columbia Law School; University of California, Berkeley
- Scientific career
- Fields: Bioethics; Sociology; Legal studies
- Workplaces: University of California, San Francisco; University of California, Hastings College of the Law; University of California, Berkeley

Osagie Kingsley Obasogie (born August 21, 1977) is a law professor and bioethicist at UC Berkeley. He is the Haas Distinguished Chair, Professor of Law at Berkeley Law, and Professor of Bioethics in the UC Berkeley – UCSF Joint Medical Program and the UC Berkeley School of Public Health. He studies bioethics, sociology, and law, in particular race in law and medicine.

== Education and academic positions ==
Obasogie studied sociology and political science at Yale University, where he received his B.A. in 1999. In 2002 he graduated with a J.D. from Columbia Law School, where he was a Harlan Fiske Stone Scholar. He then studied sociology at the University of California, Berkeley, obtaining his PhD there in 2008. From 2008 to 2016, Obasogie was a law professor at The University of California, Hastings College of the Law.

== Academic work ==
Obasogie is known for his 2013 book Blinded by Sight: Seeing Race In The Eyes Of The Blind, which describes his research on how blind people perceive race. In Blinded by Sight, Obasogie established through interview research that the perception of race does not depend on the ability to see individuals' skin colors; rather, people who are not able to see are nevertheless able to assemble contextual cues to determine others' races, and this can affect how they behave towards others. Obasogie argues that this sociological phenomenon has immediate implications for jurisprudence, for example in considerations about the Equal Protection Clause, where the legal consensus rests on the idea that a person's racial identity is visually obvious and immediately knowable. The book was noted for employing a successful research design to recover original insights which challenge the seemingly obvious assumption that race is communicated visually, contributing to sociological, legal, and ethical theories about race.

Obasogie has been credited, together with a few other faculty members, with causing the University of California, Berkeley to shut down a eugenics research fund that it had used to fund research by faculty members in its School of Public Health.

Obasogie has been a frequent media commentator and analyst on topics like racial justice and medical ethics, publishing opinion articles in outlets such as The New York Times, The Washington Post, and The Atlantic.
