= Vanderbilt Law Review =

- Discipline: Law
- Language: English
- Edited by: Jacqueline Faith Tubbs

Publication details
- History: 1947–present
- Publisher: Vanderbilt University Law School (United States)
- Frequency: Bimonthly

Standard abbreviations
- Bluebook: Vand. L. Rev.
- ISO 4: Vanderbilt Law Rev.

Indexing
- ISSN: 0042-2533
- LCCN: 79010506

Links
- Journal homepage; HeinOnline

The Vanderbilt Law Review is the flagship academic journal of Vanderbilt University Law School. The law review was founded in 1947 and is published six times per year. In 2022, it was ranked #8 among general-topic law reviews by the Washington and Lee law journal rankings. Articles appearing in the Vanderbilt Law Review have been cited by the Supreme Court, all thirteen federal circuit courts of appeal, and hundreds of other law reviews and journals. In 2008, the Vanderbilt Law Review launched Vanderbilt Law Review En Banc, an online companion to the law review. En Banc publishes responses to articles in the Vanderbilt Law Review, book reviews and comments, shorter essays on developing topics in legal scholarship, and Delaware Corporate Law Bulletins which comment on recent corporate case law developments in Delaware.
