= Ellen Wright Clayton =

American geneticist

Ellen Wright Clayton is an American academic specializing in law and medicine. She is the Rosalind E. Franklin Professor of Genetics at Vanderbilt University and chairwoman of the Institute of Medicine Board at the Population Health and Public Health Practice. She was the 2013 recipient of the David Rall Medal.

== Early life ==
Wright Clayton was born in Houston, Texas, where she attended school. She graduated from Duke with a degree in zoology and then obtained master's degree in biochemistry from Stanford University. Some years later she got her degree in law from Yale, and medical degree from Harvard respectively.

== Career ==
From 1988, Wright Clayton served as Vanderbilt University faculty member and since that time has published two books and over 150 peer-reviewed articles relating to law, medicine and public health. She serves on the advisory board panel of both the National Institutes of Health and Human Genome Organisation. In 2006, she was elected to Institute of Medicine and three years later became its council member.

In 2012, she began her three-year term as the Bachelor of Philosophy chairwoman at Vanderbilt University. Since November 6, 2013, she has served as Nashville Business Journal editor. Currently she teaches in both medical and law schools and is a director of Vanderbilt's Center for Genetics and Health Policy.

Clayton is a fellow of American Association for the Advancement of Science and American Pediatric Society. She was elected a fellow of the American College of Medical Informatics in 2023.

== Personal life ==
On Sundays she sang in a choir.

== Selected publications ==
- Gerald B Hickson; Ellen Wright Clayton; Penny B Githens; Frank A Sloan (1992). "Factors that prompted families to file medical malpractice claims following perinatal injuries". JAMA. 267 (10): 1359–1363. doi:10.1001/jama.1992.03480100065032. PMID 1740858.
- Ellen Wright Clayton; Gerald B Hickson; Cynthia S Miller (1994). "Parents' responses to vaccine information pamphlets". Pediatrics. 93 (3). American Academy of Pediatrics: 369–372. doi:10.1542/peds.93.3.369. PMID 8115193. S2CID 37152397.
- A Kohrman; E Wright Clayton; JE Frader; MA Grodin; KL Moseley; IH Porter; VM Wagner (1995). "Informed consent, parental permission, and assent in pediatric practice". Pediatrics. 95 (2): 314–317. doi:10.1542/peds.95.2.314. ISSN 0031-4005. S2CID 22221051.
- Ellen Wright Clayton (2005). "Informed consent and biobanks". The Journal of Law, Medicine & Ethics. 33 (1): 15–21. doi:10.1111/j.1748-720x.2005.tb00206.x. PMID 15934662. S2CID 26573101.
- Ellen Wright Clayton; Lainie Friedman Ross (2006). "Implications of disclosing individual results of clinical research". JAMA. 295 (1): 33–38. doi:10.1001/jama.295.1.37-a. PMID 16391213.
- Dan M Roden; Jill M Pulley; Melissa A Basford; Gordon R Bernard; Ellen W Clayton; Jeffrey R Balser; Dan R Masys (2008). "Development of a large-scale de-identified DNA biobank to enable personalized medicine". Clinical Pharmacology & Therapeutics. 84 (3): 362–369. doi:10.1038/clpt.2008.89. PMC 3763939. PMID 18500243.
- Susan M Wolf; Frances P Lawrenz; Charles A Nelson; Jeffrey P Kahn; Mildred K Cho; Ellen Wright Clayton; et al. (2008). "Managing incidental findings in human subjects research: analysis and recommendations". The Journal of Law, Medicine & Ethics. 36 (2): 219–248. doi:10.1111/j.1748-720X.2008.00266.x. PMC 2575242. PMID 18547191.
- Jill Pulley; Ellen Clayton; Gordon R Bernard; Dan M Roden; Daniel R Masys (2010). "Principles of Human Subjects Protections Applied in an Opt‐Out, De‐identified Biobank". Clinical and Translational Science. 3 (1): 42–48. doi:10.1111/j.1752-8062.2010.00175.x. PMC 3075971. PMID 20443953.
- Ellen Wright Clayton; Amy L. McGuire (2012). "The legal risks of returning results of genomics research". Genetics in Medicine. 14 (4): 473–477. doi:10.1038/gim.2012.10. PMC 3779603. PMID 22323070.
- Ellen Wright Clayton; Karen K Steinberg; Muin J Khoury; Elizabeth Thomson; Lori Andrews; Mary Jo Ellis Kahn; Loretta M Kopelman; Joan O Weiss (2013). "Informed consent for genetic research on stored tissue samples". JAMA. 274 (22): 1786–1792. doi:10.1001/jama.1995.03530220052033. PMID 7500511.
