= Frank A. Sloan =

American health economist

Frank Allen Sloan (born August 15, 1942) is an American health economist. As of 2023, he is the J. Alexander McMahon Distinguished Professor Emeritus of Health Policy and Management and Professor of Economics at Duke University.

== Early life and education ==
Sloan was born in the United States and received his A.B. in Economics from Oberlin College in 1964 and his Ph.D. in economics from Harvard University in 1969. His dissertation was on the Economic Models of Physician Supply.

== Career ==
After graduation, Sloan worked as a research economist at the RAND Corporation. Sloan served as the Centennial Professor of Economics at Vanderbilt University from April 1984 to June 1993. Sloan was appointed as the J. Alexander McMahon Professor of Health Policy and Management and Professor of Economics at Duke University in 1993. He also served as director of the Duke Center for Health Policy, Law and Management from 1998 to 2004.

Sloan researches and writes about the economic aspects of health issues. He is the author of a number of books detailing the results of his investigations. He has also written or contributed to more than 300 published articles on a variety of medical topics, ranging from macular degeneration to government economic policy.
