= David Rall Medal =

The David Rall Medal is an award given annually by the National Academy of Medicine of the United States to one of its members who "...has demonstrated distinguished leadership as chair of a study committee or other such activity, showing commitment above and beyond the usual responsibilities of the position." It is named in honor of the late David Rall, the former director of the National Institute of Environmental Health Sciences. The first award was given in 2000.

== Recipients ==
- 2000 - Stuart Bondurant
- 2001 - Dorothy P. Rice
- 2002 - Joshua Lederberg
- 2003 - Daniel Federman
- 2004 - Marie McCormick
- 2005 - Torsten N. Wiesel
- 2006 - Fitzhugh Mullan
- 2007 - William C. Richardson
- 2008 - Sheila Burke
- 2009 - Bernard Guyer
- 2010 - Nancy Adler
- 2011 - Virginia Stallings
- 2012 - Linda Rosenstock
- 2013 - Ellen Wright Clayton
- 2014 - Richard B. Johnston, Jr.
- 2015 - Jonathan Samet
- 2016 - Donna Shalala
- 2017 - Richard O. Hynes
- 2018 - Hedvig Hricak
- 2019 - David Savitz
- 2020 - David Eaton

== See also ==
- List of medicine awards
