= Paige Skiba =

American economist

Paige Marta Skiba
- Citizenship: United States
- Education: University of California at Berkeley (PhD); University of Massachusetts at Amherst (BA)
- Scientific career
- Fields: Law and economics
- Workplaces: Vanderbilt University School of Law
- Website: https://law.vanderbilt.edu/phd/faculty/paige-skiba/index.php

Paige Marta Skiba is an American economist who is a FedEx Research Professor Professor of Law and Professor of Economics at Vanderbilt University Law School, and an associate editor of the International Review of Law and Economics. She is an expert on the causes of consequences of consumer borrowing at high interest rates, such as payday loans and pawnshop loans. She finds that these borrowers have few other options for credit, but often default on these loans after making expensive payments. During the COVID-19 recession, she was among a group of scholars of bankruptcy in the United States who proposed giving small businesses more time during the bankruptcy process to regain solvency.

== Selected works ==
- Skiba, Paige Marta, and Jeremy Tobacman. "Do payday loans cause bankruptcy?." The Journal of Law and Economics 62, no. 3 (2019): 485–519.
- Agarwal, Sumit, Paige Marta Skiba, and Jeremy Tobacman. "Payday loans and credit cards: New liquidity and credit scoring puzzles?." American Economic Review 99, no. 2 (2009): 412–17.
- Bhutta, Neil, Paige Marta Skiba, and Jeremy Tobacman. "Payday loan choices and consequences." Journal of Money, Credit and Banking 47, no. 2-3 (2015): 223–260.
- Dobbie, Will, and Paige Marta Skiba. "Information asymmetries in consumer credit markets: Evidence from payday lending." American Economic Journal: Applied Economics 5, no. 4 (2013): 256–82.
- Hankins, Scott, Mark Hoekstra, and Paige Marta Skiba. "The ticket to easy street? The financial consequences of winning the lottery." Review of Economics and Statistics 93, no. 3 (2011): 961–969.
