= Jim Rossi =

American legal scholar

Jim Rossi is an American legal scholar. He is the Judge D.L. Lansden Chair in Law at Vanderbilt University Law School, where he specializes in Energy Law and Administrative Law. His books include Regulatory Bargaining and Public Law (Cambridge University Press 2005), New Frontiers of State Constitutional Law: Dual Enforcement of Norms (Oxford University Press 2010) (with James Gardner) and Energy, Economics and the Environment (Sixth edition, Foundation Press 2024) (with Joel Eisen, Emily Hammond, Joshua Macey, David Spence & Hannah Wiseman).

== Education and career ==
Rossi holds an LL.M. from Yale Law School, a J.D. from the University of Iowa, and a B.S. from the Honors College at Arizona State University. Following law school he practiced energy law in Washington, D.C.

Rossi serves on the Advisory Council for the Electric Power Research Institute. He formerly was the Harry M. Walborsky Professor at Florida State University College of Law (from 1995 until 2012), and also has taught as a visiting professor at Harvard Law School (2009) and the University of Texas School of Law (2000–01).

Rossi has authored publications that deal with legal framework governing energy transitions in the U.S., including federalism, judicial oversight of energy markets, public utility regulation, and "stranded cost" issues. His 2019 Cornell Law Review article "Energy Exactions" (coauthored with Vanderbilt Law Professor Chris Serkin) received the 2020 Morrison Prize for the most impactful sustainability-related legal academic article published in North America during the previous year. Rossi has also published on administrative law. "Agency Coordination in Shared Regulatory Space" (a 2012 Harvard Law Review article coauthored with Harvard Professor Jody Freeman) inspired a study and policy recommendations on agency coordination adopted in 2012 by the Administrative Conference of the United States.
