= Thomas H. Malone =

2nd Dean of Vanderbilt University Law School, 1875-1904

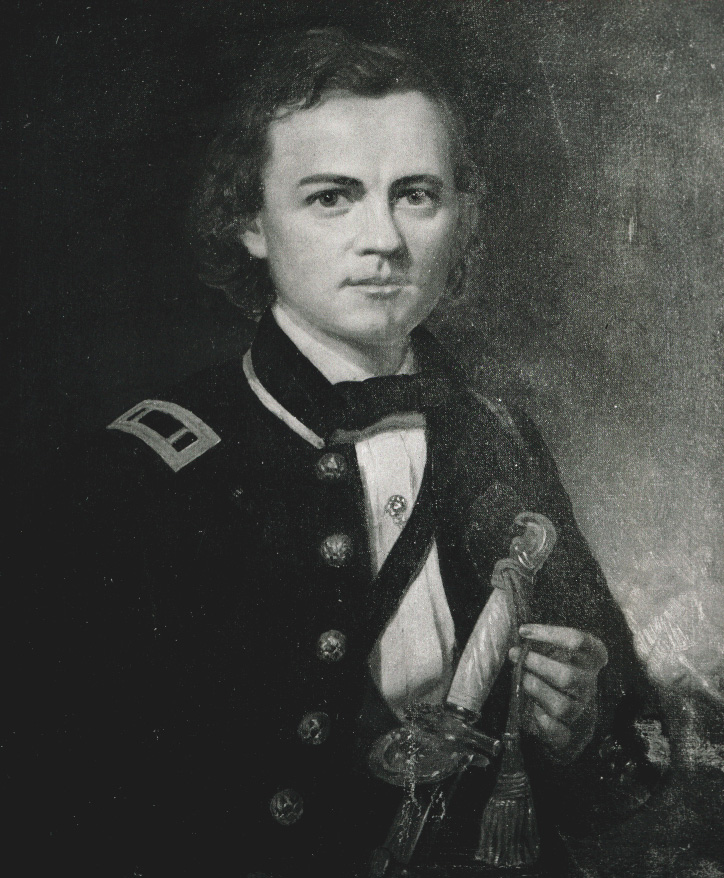
- Malone (c. 1861)
- Born: 1834; Limestone County, Alabama, U.S.
- Died: 1906 (aged 71–72); Nashville, Tennessee, U.S.
- Education: University of Virginia
- Occupations: Lawyer, businessman, academic
- Spouses: Ellen Fall; Milbrey Ewing Fall
- Children: 2 sons, 2 daughters
- Parent: James C. Malone

Thomas H. Malone (1834-1906) was an American Confederate veteran, judge, businessman and academic administrator. He served as the President of the Nashville Gas Company from 1893 to 1906. He served as the second Dean of the Vanderbilt University Law School from 1875 to 1904.

== Early life ==
Thomas H. Malone was born in 1834 in Limestone County, Alabama. His father, James C. Malone, was a large planter.

Malone graduated from the University of Virginia in 1855. He clerked with Houston & Brown, a law firm in Nashville, and he was admitted to the state bar in 1859.

== Career ==
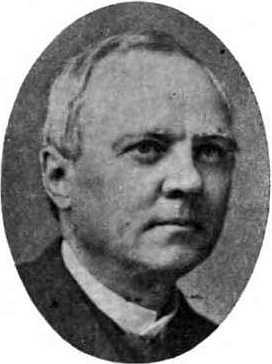
Thomas H. Malone

Malone started his legal career with Houston, Vaughn & Malone in the early 1860s At the outset of the American Civil War, he served as lieutenant in the Rock City Guards, a Nashville militia. He subsequently served in the Confederate States Army, first under General Dabney H. Maury and then under General Joseph Wheeler. He was caught by Union forces in Shelbyville, Tennessee.

After the war, Malone co-founded the law firm DeMoss & Malone. He worked for the firm until 1892. He was elected as a judge on the chancery court of the 6th division of Tennessee and later served as its chancellor. Malone served the President of the Nashville Gas Company from 1898 to 1906.

Malone served as the second Dean of the Vanderbilt University Law School from 1875 to 1904. One of his students was Jacob M. Dickinson.

Malone was a recipient of the Southern Cross of Honor from the Bate Chapter of the United Daughters of the Confederacy.

== Personal life ==
Malone married Ellen Fall in 1866. They had two sons, Thomas H. Malone Jr. and Edward F. Malone, and two daughters, Jane (who married William T. MacGruder) and Julia. After she died in 1897, he married Milbrey Ewing Fall.

Malone was a member of the Methodist Episcopal Church, South. He was also a Knight Templar.

== Death and legacy ==
Malone died in 1906 in Nashville, Tennessee. His funeral was conducted by Collins Denny. Malone bequeathed his Honeywood Farm to his widow while his sons received stocks from the Nashville Gas Company. Moreover, one of his sons, Thomas H. Malone Jr., was elected to the Board of Directors of the Nashville Gas Company; he was also Assistant Professor at the Vanderbilt University Law School.
