= Terry Maroney =

American law professor

Terry A. Maroney is the Robert S. and Theresa L. Reder Chair in Law at Vanderbilt University Law School. She is known for her work linking the law and human behavior and emotions.

== Education and career ==
Maroney received her B.A. from Oberlin College in 1989 and earned her J.D. in 1998 from New York University School of Law. Following law school she worked at New York University, and served as a clerk for Amalya Kearse. She joined the faculty at Vanderbilt University Law School in 2006 and was named the Robert S. and Theresa L. Reder Chair in Law in 2021.

== Scholarship ==
Maroney is known for her work on law and emotion. She has spoken on the legal rights of children, and on the expression of emotion by judges during court cases. She has publicly discussed instances when judges have tried to reduce publicity about a case, and signed on to a letter opposing the lawfirm Skadden, Arps, Slate, Meagher & Flom's concession to the demands of Donald Trump.

== Selected publications ==
- Maroney, Terry A. (2006). "Law and Emotion: A Proposed Taxonomy of an Emerging Field". Law and Human Behavior. 30 (2): 119–142. doi:10.1007/s10979-006-9029-9. ISSN 1573-661X.
- Maroney, Terry A. (2011). "Emotional Regulation and Judicial Behavior". California Law Review. 99: 1485.
- Maroney, Terry A. (2011). "The Persistent Cultural Script of Judicial Dispassion". California Law Review. 99: 629.
- Maroney, Terry A.; Gross, James J. (2014). "The Ideal of the Dispassionate Judge: An Emotion Regulation Perspective". Emotion Review. 6 (2): 142–151. doi:10.1177/1754073913491989. ISSN 1754-0739.
