= J. B. Ruhl =

Academic work
- Discipline: Law
- Sub-discipline: Environmental law
- Institutions: Vanderbilt University Law School

Dr. J.B. Ruhl is an American legal academic who specializes in environmental law. He is the David Daniels Allen Distinguished Chair in Law at Vanderbilt Law School. He received his B.A. and J.D. degrees from the University of Virginia as well as his LL.M. (1986) in Environmental Law from the George Washington University Law School. He also holds a Ph.D. in geography from Southern Illinois University. He is an elected member of the American Law Institute.

== Scholarly contributions ==
His books include The Law of Biodiversity and Ecosystem Management (Foundation Press, 2nd ed. 2006) and The Law and Policy of Ecosystem Services (Island Press 2007). He has written many journal articles on environmental law and administrative law. His work on regulation addresses complexity theory and the law as well as the role of peer review and science in environmental regulation. As a leading authority on endangered species protection and wetlands mitigation banking, he is recognized as one of the most cited U.S. academics in environmental law.
