= Lucius E. Burch =

American football player and surgeon (1874–1959)

- Born: December 10, 1874; Nashville, Tennessee
- Died: October 15, 1959 (aged 84); Nashville, Tennessee
- Known for: Professor Emeritus Obstetrics & Gynecology
- Football career

Vanderbilt Commodores
- Position: Guard
- Class: 1896

Career information
- College: Vanderbilt (1894–1897)

Awards and highlights
- SIAA championship (1897); All-time Vanderbilt first team (1912)

Lucius Edward "Luke" Burch (December 10, 1874 – October 15, 1959) was a college football player and prominent surgeon in the South who was once Dean of Vanderbilt University Medical School. He was the father of Lucius E. Burch Jr.

== Early life ==
Burch attended the Webb School in Bell Buckle, Tennessee.

== Vanderbilt University ==
Burch received his M. D. Degree in 1896.

=== Football ===
He was a prominent player on the Vanderbilt Commodores football team from 1894 to 1897 – "one of the best guards developed in the United States during his athletic career." Burch was selected first team for an all-time Vanderbilt football team in 1912. One writer opines "Captain Keller...was the greatest football expert that ever played on a southern field. I think also that Luke Burch was the greatest guard and that Phil Connell was the greatest fullback that has ever played on a southern field."

==== 1897 ====
The 1897 team went undefeated allowing no points and had the first conference championship for the school.

== Medical practice ==
Burch practiced briefly in Bear Spring, Tennessee before studying surgery at St. George's Hospital in London. He joined the Vanderbilt School of Medicine in 1904 as Professor of Gynecology before becoming dean ten years later.
