= Zion Presbyterian Church (Columbia, Tennessee) =

Historic church in Tennessee, United States

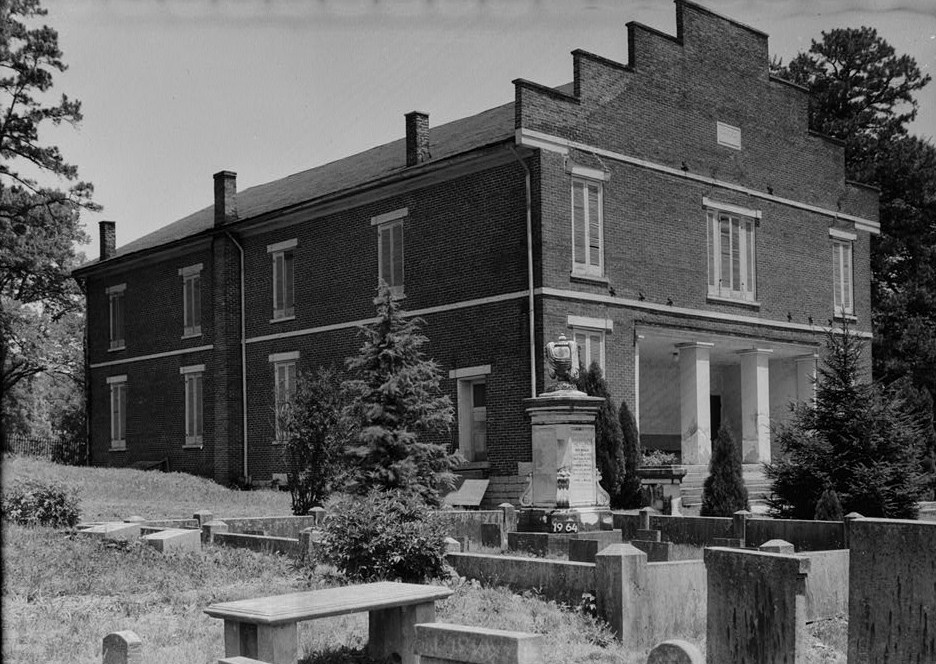
- Zion Presbyterian Church in 1936

- Location in the state of Tennessee
- 35°35′56″N 87°8′42″W
- Location: Maury County, Tennessee
- Country: United States
- Denomination: Presbyterian Church in America
- Website: www.zioncolumbia.org

History
- Status: Church

Architecture
- Functional status: Active
- Style: Greek Revival
- Completed: April 7, 1849; 177 years ago
- Construction cost: US$7,000

Specifications
- Materials: Brick

Clergy
- Pastor(s): Rev. Jeff Wilkins; Rev. Keaton Paul
- Zion Presbyterian Church
- U.S. National Register of Historic Places
- NRHP reference No.: 72001245
- Added to NRHP: June 13, 1972

Floor plan

The Zion Presbyterian Church is a historic building in Maury County, Tennessee. The church was built between 1847 and 1849 of brick in the Greek Revival style. President James K. Polk attended a school conducted by the church. The property was listed on the National Register of Historic Places on June 13, 1972.

== History ==
Zion Presbyterian Church was established in the early 19th century by Scots-Irish families from South Carolina who moved to Maury County, Tennessee. In 1807, they organized and built a structure on 5,000 acres (20 km^{2}) of land they purchased from heirs of Major-General Nathanael Greene, who had received the land as part of a 25,000-acre (100 km^{2}) American Revolutionary War land grant. The original building was replaced with a brick structure in 1813. The present building was constructed in the Greek Revival style by members and their slaves using brick, limestone, and timber. The architectural styling features stepped gables and a recessed open vestibule. A gallery was also provided for slaves to attend service. In the 1880s, windows styled after Tiffany Stained Glass were added to the church building.

== Cemetery ==
With over 1,500 graves, the Zion Presbyterian Church cemetery of is also of historical significance. In addition to many of the church's founding members, soldiers from the American Revolutionary War, the War of 1812, and the American Civil War are also interred there. The church cemetery contains a monument to "Daddy Ben," a slave who, during the Revolutionary War, refused to tell the British where his master was hiding, and survived three hanging attempts by the British Army.

== See also ==
- National Register of Historic Places listings in Maury County, Tennessee
