= Jennifer Robbennolt =

American lawyer

Jennifer K. Robbennolt is an American lawyer, an expert in the areas of psychology and law, torts, and dispute resolution and her research involving psychology into the study of law and legal institutions, focusing primarily on legal decision-making and the use of empirical research methodology in law, currently the Alice Curtis Campbell Professor at University of Illinois.
