= Tharin =

Tharin may refer to:

- Tharin Gartrell, individual involved in the Barack Obama assassination plot in Denver
- Irène Tharin, French politician
