= Sheryl H. Lipman =

American judge (born 1963)

Sheryl Lipman
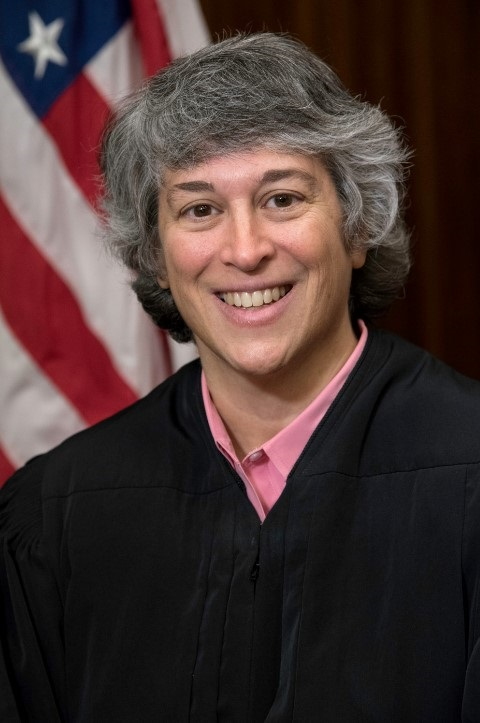
- Lipman in 2023

Chief Judge of the United States District Court for the Western District of Tennessee
- Incumbent
- Assumed office January 20, 2023
- Preceded by: S. Thomas Anderson

Judge of the United States District Court for the Western District of Tennessee
- Incumbent
- Assumed office May 1, 2014
- Appointed by: Barack Obama
- Preceded by: Jon Phipps McCalla

Personal details
- Born: Sheryl Halle Lipman; 1963 (age 61–62) Memphis, Tennessee, U.S.
- Education: University of Michigan (BA); New York University (JD)

Sheryl Halle Lipman (born 1963) is the chief United States district judge of the United States District Court for the Western District of Tennessee and a former university counsel for the University of Memphis.

== Biography ==
Lipman received a Bachelor of Arts degree in 1984 from the University of Michigan. She received a Juris Doctor in 1987 from the New York University School of Law. She served as a law clerk to Judge Julia S. Gibbons of the United States District Court for the Western District of Tennessee from 1987 to 1988. From 1988 to 1991, she worked at the law firm of Reed Smith, focusing on white-collar criminal defense work. From 1991 to 1995, she worked at Wyatt, Tarrant & Combs LLP, focusing on civil litigation. From 1996 to 1997, she served as vice president of comprehensive services at the Memphis Race Relations & Diversity Institute. She worked at Burch, Porter & Johnson, PLLC, practicing civil litigation from 1997 to 1999. From 1999 until 2014 she worked at the University of Memphis, joining in 1999 as a senior attorney and becoming university counsel in 2002. In the latter capacity, she was responsible for the legal interests of the university by serving as the primary in-house counsel on all major litigation and providing regulatory advice on a wide variety of issues.

=== Federal judicial service ===
On August 1, 2013, President Barack Obama nominated Lipman to serve as a United States district judge of the United States District Court for the Western District of Tennessee. Lipman was nominated to the seat vacated by Judge Jon Phipps McCalla, who assumed senior status on August 23, 2013. On January 16, 2014, Lipman's nomination was reported out of a U.S. Senate committee. On April 11, 2014, Senate Majority Leader Reid filed a motion to invoke cloture on the nomination. On April 29, 2014, the United States Senate invoked cloture on her nomination by a 58–39 vote. On April 30, 2014, her nomination was confirmed by a 95–0 vote. Lipman received her judicial commission on May 1, 2014, and took the oath of office on August 15, 2014. She became the chief judge on January 20, 2023.

== See also ==
- List of Jewish American jurists

Legal offices
| Preceded by Jon Phipps McCalla | Judge of the United States District Court for the Western District of Tennessee; 2014–present | Incumbent |
| Preceded by S. Thomas Anderson | Chief Judge of the United States District Court for the Western District of Tennessee; 2023–present | Incumbent |
