= NCLR (disambiguation) =

The National Council of La Raza is the former name of UnidosUS, a U.S. Latino advocacy nonprofit.

NCLR may also refer to:

- National Center for LGBTQ Rights, formerly the National Center for Lesbian Rights
- National Conference of Law Reviews
