= Battle of Preston =

Battle of Preston may refer to:

- Battle of Preston (1648) was a victory for Oliver Cromwell over the Royalists during the English Civil War.
- Battle of Preston (1715) was a defeat for the rebels in the Jacobite Rising.
- Battle of Prestonpans 1745, a victory for the Jacobites over the British government in 1745.

== See also ==
- W. Preston Battle (1908–1969), American lawyer and judge
