= Walter Preston Battle =

American judge (1908–1969)

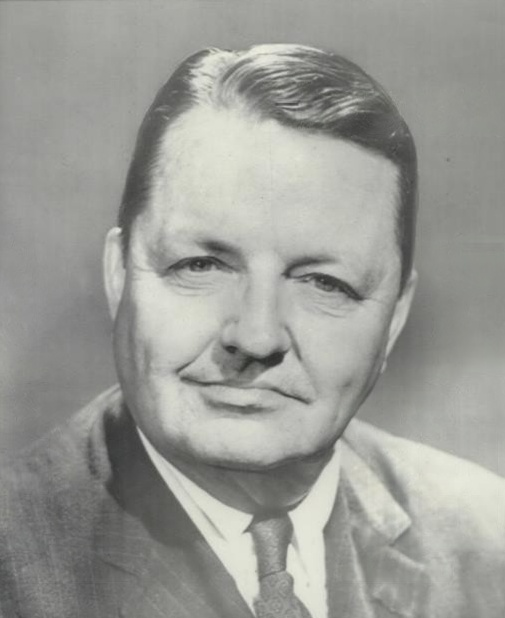
- Battle c. 1968

Criminal Court Judge
- In office 1959–1969

Personal details
- Born: May 6, 1908 Memphis, Tennessee, U.S.
- Died: March 31, 1969, age 60 Memphis, Tennessee, U.S.

Walter Preston Battle (May 6, 1908 – March 31, 1969), known professionally as W. Preston Battle, (Note: The legal literature is largely consistent after 1959 in referring to Battle as "W. Preston Battle." Outside the legal literature, however, and both before and after 1959, his name appears in a variety of forms, including "Walter Preston Battle", "Walter Preston Battle Jr.", "W. P. Battle Jr.", and "Preston Battle".) was an American lawyer and criminal court judge in Shelby County, Tennessee. He served as an assistant district attorney general for more than a decade before spending 14 years in private practice as a criminal defense attorney. He later became a judge of the Criminal Court for what was then known as the Fifteenth Judicial Circuit.

Battle presided over the criminal proceedings in State of Tennessee v. James Earl Ray (1969), in which James Earl Ray pleaded guilty to the assassination of Martin Luther King Jr.; Battle sentenced Ray to 99 years in prison. Legal commentators note the unusually strict security and press restrictions Battle imposed during the proceedings to protect the court and prevent prejudicial publicity. Battle died in office 21 days after sentencing Ray.

== Early life ==
Battle was born in Memphis, Tennessee, on May 6, 1908, to Walter Preston Battle Sr., a broker in the cottonseed industry, and Fannie Perkins. He had one younger brother, John Hampden Battle. He grew up in a family that identified with its Confederate heritage, with ancestors who had fought in the American Civil War.

He attended secondary school at Memphis University School and Woodberry Forest School. After graduating from high school, he enrolled at Washington and Lee University (1930), where he was a member of Beta Theta Pi and served as vice president of the college drama club. He later earned his law degree from the University of Memphis Law School and was admitted to the bar in 1933.

== Career ==
Battle began his legal career as an assistant district attorney general in Shelby County in 1934. He first served under district attorney general W. T. McLain until his death in July 1938. McLain was originally elected in 1934 for a term of eight years. A controversy over who would be the next district attorney general ensued, with the governor's appointment of candidate Joseph Hanover in dispute.

With the office empty, Battle was appointed as acting district attorney general (pro tempore) by Judge Phil Wallace to serve out the remainder of McLain's term until a special election could be held the next month. Marion Speed Boyd was subsequently elected and served as district attorney general from 1938 to 1940, followed by Will Gerber from 1940 to 1948.

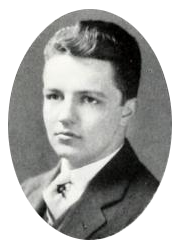
Battle in 1929

During his 11-year tenure as assistant to the district attorney general, Battle worked on thousands of criminal cases, many involving homicide. "In those days", Battle told The Birmingham News, "Memphis was known as the murder capital of the world." Battle resigned from his position in 1945 and entered private practice as a criminal lawyer for the next 14 years. He considered the Landon V. Butler case one of the most "exciting" of his career. He attempted to defend Butler from charges of warehouse fraud involving Alabama Grain Elevator Company, but he was eventually convicted and sentenced to three years in prison.

In 1952, Battle was admitted to the bar of the Supreme Court of the United States. He later ran in a Shelby County bar association primary for Circuit Court judge, winning in 1959. The governor appointed him judge of Division 3 of the Criminal Court of Shelby County, then organized as the Fifteenth Judicial Circuit. He served on the court for the next decade.

As a judge, Battle presided over several notable cases, including the murder trial of grocery store owner Louis F. Montesi. In another case, he dismissed the indictment against a movie theatre manager charged under the state's obscenity law for planning to screen I Spit on Your Grave (1959), a film containing interracial sex scenes, ruling that the law was unconstitutional. Although the decision drew public criticism, Battle stood by his ruling. He unsuccessfully pursued an appointment to the Tennessee Supreme Court in 1965. Battle was re-elected to an eight-year term as judge of the Criminal Court in 1966.

=== State of Tennessee v. James Earl Ray ===
The assassination of Martin Luther King Jr. occurred on April 4, 1968, during King's visit to Tennessee in support of the Memphis sanitation strike. On May 7, the Shelby County Criminal Court returned an indictment charging escaped prisoner James Earl Ray with the first-degree murder of King. He was subsequently captured in London on June 8 and extradited back to Memphis more than a month later on July 19. Judge Battle was chosen to preside over the case after a random draw among five (Note: Walter Preston Battle, Arthur C. Faquin, Jr., Perry H. Sellers, C. O. Horton, and John P. Colton, Sr.) criminal court judges in Shelby County. The trial proceedings took place in the Shelby County Criminal Courts Building at 150 Washington Avenue in downtown Memphis, Shelby County's main criminal courthouse at the time. (Note: In the 1980s, criminal court operations were relocated to the Walter L. Bailey Jr. Criminal Justice Center at 201 Poplar Avenue.)

Due to the worldwide attention given to the case, Battle became concerned about prejudicial publicity and, citing Sheppard v. Maxwell (1966), issued a series of restrictive orders to protect the proceedings. He consulted with an advisory committee of eight lawyers, who helped develop and enforce guidelines governing courtroom security and restricting publicity. The New York Times described the courtroom safeguards as "perhaps the strictest security measures in American trial history."

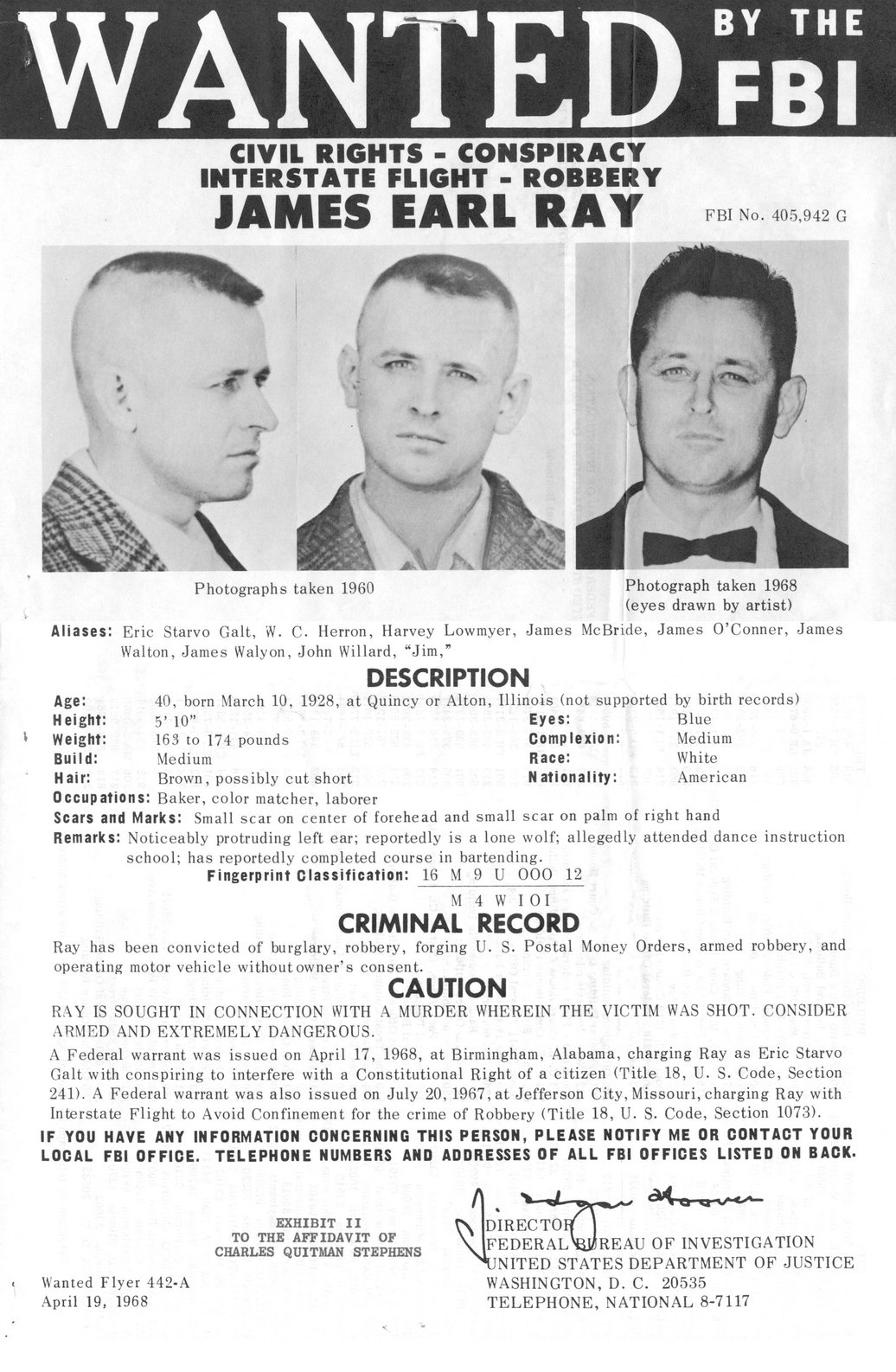
Flyer issued April 19, 1968. Ray was #277 on the FBI Ten Most Wanted Fugitives of the 1960s under FBI Director J. Edgar Hoover.

Battle's restrictions against publicity initially prohibited all recording devices of any kind, including courtroom sketches, and banned virtually all participants, including law enforcement officials, from speaking with the media. James E. Fox later wrote in the Memphis State University Law Review that they were "probably the strictest regulations of news media and courtroom procedures ever witnessed in Tennessee."

The orders even extended to United States Attorney General Ramsey Clark and the Department of Justice, with Battle's advisory committee accusing the nation's chief law enforcement officer of contempt, along with Ray's own attorney and the local Shelby County sheriff. In October, Battle held journalists Charles Edmundson of The Commercial Appeal and Roy Hamilton of the Memphis Press-Scimitar, along with Ray's attorney, Arthur J. Hanes Sr., and his investigator, Renfro Hays, in contempt of court for violating the restrictions. Battle later referred to his own enforcement of the restrictions as operating on the "frontier of the law".

After a delay in November, the court date was postponed until the next year, in March 1969. The case was short, lasting only 144 minutes, as Ray agreed to a plea bargain to avoid the death penalty. He confessed to shooting Martin Luther King Jr. and pled guilty on March 10 in exchange for a sentence of 99 years in prison. Ray was moved to the Tennessee State Prison the next day. He fired his lawyer on March 12 and notified Battle about his intent to file for a new hearing in a letter.

Shortly before leaving on vacation on March 16, Battle told the Associated Press that despite the guilty plea and sentencing, the case still had many open questions. He questioned how Ray managed to escape Memphis without being detected despite a widespread police alert, but believed that a full trial would have complicated rather than clarified the strong evidence identifying Ray as the assassin. Ultimately, Battle believed there was still no compelling evidence of a conspiracy. After the judge left for vacation, Ray sent a second letter to Battle's office on March 26, requesting permission to withdraw the plea and proceed to trial.

== Death ==
After a week-long vacation, Battle returned to work on Monday, March 31. He was last seen before 1 p.m. Battle is believed to have died while writing at his desk that afternoon. He was found slumped over his desk in his chambers at approximately 5:25 p.m. His body was later determined to have been in that state for approximately two hours prior to being found. An assistant district attorney and prosecutor in the case against Ray made the discovery after trying and failing to contact the judge. After noticing a light on in Battle's office after working hours, he decided to investigate, eventually finding Battle's body. Authorities at the scene said there was no evidence of foul play.

Battle was transported to Methodist Hospital where he was declared dead at 6:02 p.m. At the time of his death, Battle was 60 years old, just over a month away from his 61st birthday. He had been previously treated for a mild case of diabetes and for neck problems. An autopsy was performed that night by Jerry T. Francisco, the same medical examiner who had originally conducted the postmortem on Martin Luther King Jr. He reported that Battle showed signs of coronary insufficiency, possibly exacerbated by the emotional strain of the case. Battle had no known history of heart problems. A service took place at Grace-St. Luke's Episcopal Church the next day, with a burial at Elmwood Cemetery.

== Posthumous events ==
After Battle's untimely death, both of Ray's letters were entered into the court. Battle was succeeded by Arthur C. Faquin, who rejected Ray's request for a new trial, as did the Tennessee Supreme Court in 1970. The court claimed that Ray had "voluntarily waived his right to appeal". Ray's attorney later argued, however, citing an obscure Tennessee law, that a defendant may be entitled to a new trial if a judge dies while a motion affecting the case is still under consideration.

== Personal life ==
Battle married Florence Warfield Boyce and helped raise four children. Early in his career, he was friends with the son of influential politician E. H. Crump. Battle was involved in a car accident on August 9, 1940, and was arrested and fined for drunk driving. As a young, 30 year-old prosecutor at the time, the incident received attention in Tennessee newspapers (Note: According to the Newspapers.com archive, Battle's drunk driving incident was distributed by the Associated Press and covered just under 30 times in the month of August 1940 by about half a dozen Tennessee newspapers.) and was distributed by the Associated Press. He sought treatment for his alcoholism and became active with Alcoholics Anonymous and was open about his road to recovery. He was appointed by Governor Frank G. Clement to the State Alcoholism Commission in 1955.

== Legacy ==
In his book A Search for Justice (1971), journalist John Seigenthaler, formerly writer and editor of The Tennessean and assistant to attorney general Robert F. Kennedy, provides a comprehensive, yet critical analysis of Battle's legacy in relation to the criminal proceedings in the Ray case and the impact of Battle's legal career that may have played an influential role in the outcome.

Battle, Seigenthaler argues, "was admired as a man who had saved himself" from alcoholism "and had become a good citizen and a good judge," but he believed that Battle was fearful of being reversed by a higher court. Just several years earlier, the Tennessee Supreme Court overruled two of Battle's decisions in separate convictions in the Montesi murder case.

Seigenthaler describes Battle as "A graying man with heavy jowls...industrious, careful, even studious when it was necessary to research precedents. He enjoyed reading the Greek Classics. Some lawyers called him 'old unflappable.' But he had a tendency to be an absolutist: to make up his mind that he was right on a narrow legal question and then proceed, looking neither left nor right."

== See also ==
- Nebraska Press Association v. Stuart

== Sources ==
=== Books ===
- Battle, Herbert Bemerton; Yelverton, Lois; Battle, William James (1930). The Battle Book: A Genealogy of the Battle Family in America. The Paragon Press. OCLC 608594727.
- "Boyd, Marion Speed". Justices and Judges of the United States Courts. Vol. 1. Administrative Office of the United States Courts. 1980. OCLC 1423262767.
- Hutchinson, Campbell C., ed. (1929). "Juniors". Calyx. Washington and Lee University. OCLC 8424064.
- Posner, Gerald (1998). Killing the Dream: James Earl Ray and the Assassination of Martin Luther King, Jr. Random House. ISBN 9780375500824. OCLC 37675792.
- Seigenthaler, John (1971). A Search for Justice. With contributions by James Squires, John Hemphill, and Frank Ritter. Aurora Publishers. pp. 132–200, 354–393. ISBN 9780876950036. OCLC 160907.
- Social Register of Memphis. Press of Memphis Linotype Printing Co. 1925. OCLC 9391818.
- Tennessee Blue Book. Secretary of State of Tennessee. 1938. OCLC 35735724.

=== Reports ===
- United States Commission on Civil Rights (1961). Hearings before the United States Commission on Civil Rights: Hearings held in Detroit, Michigan, December 14, 1960 [and] December 15, 1960 (Report). U.S. Government Printing Office. OCLC 609001418 – via HathiTrust Digital Library.
- U.S. Department of Justice, Federal Bureau of Investigation (July 21, 2025). Records Related to the Assassination of the Reverend Dr. Martin Luther King, Jr.: FBI file 44-HQ-38861, HS1-233652821, document 25-02 (part 1 of 6) (PDF) (Report). National Archives and Records Administration.
- United States House Select Committee on Assassinations (1979). Final Report of the Select Committee on Assassinations, U.S. House of Representatives, Ninety-fifth Congress, Second Session (Report). U.S. Government Printing Office.

=== Legal scholarship ===
- Degen, Ronald D.; Effros, Stephen R.; Liberto, P. Frank; Rigby, Louis G. (1968). "Criminal Procedure". Annual Survey of American Law. 1968 (Part One) – via HeinOnline.
- Fox, James E. (1970). "Fair Trial versus Free Press: Control of Prejudicial Publicity by Use of the Contempt Power". Memphis State University Law Review. 1 (1) – via HeinOnline.

=== Newspapers ===
- "Trail [sic] Facts at a Glance". Orange County Register. United Press International. November 10, 1968.
- "Agriculture Commissioner To Decide on Revoking Grain Elevator Co. Permit". The Tuscaloosa News. Associated Press. April 1, 1955. p. 5.
- "Battle's Death May Give Ray New Trial". Lodi News-Sentinel. United Press International. April 2, 1969.
- "Clement Appoints Alcoholism Board". Kingsport Times. March 25, 1955.
- "Death of Judge is Said to Entitle James Earl Ray to a New Trial". The New York Times. Associated Press. September 3, 1997.
- "Delay Ray Trial Until March 3". The Tri-State Defender. Vol. 17, no. 51. November 16, 1968.
- Evans, James (April 1, 1969). "Death of judge could Bring Ray new trial". The Bryan Times. United Press International. p. 12.
- "Ex-Army Officer Gets State Post". Kingsport Times-News. January 20, 1946 – via NewspaperArchive.
- Gavzer, Bernard (March 17, 1969). "Full Truth in Ray Case Still Mystery to Judge". The Commercial Appeal. Associated Press.
- Hamilton, Roy B. (July 30, 1968). "Judge Goes Along With Bar Report". Memphis Press-Scimitar.
- "He's 'Stickler For the Law'". Memphis Press-Scimitar. July 19, 1968.
- "Judge Battle Dead; Heart Attack Seen". Sarasota Herald-Tribune. Associated Press. April 1, 1969.
- "Judge Dies, May Mean Trial by Jury for Ray". The Free Lance-Star. Associated Press. April 1, 1969.
- "Judge Refuses to OK Hanover Appointment", The Kingsport Times, vol. 23, no. 152, July 8, 1938
- "Judge W. Preston Battle Found Fatally Stricken, Victim of Heart Attack". The Commercial Appeal. April 1, 1969.
- "Judge W. Preston Battle Dies; Presided Over the Ray Trial". The New York Times. April 1, 1969.
- Landau, Jack (November 10, 1968). "4 persons on stage in Ray trial drama". The Birmingham News.
- "Nagging questions linger in King Assassination". The Gadsden Times. Associated Press. April 4, 1976.
- "New Trial for Ray?". The Beaver County Times. United Press International. April 1, 1969.
- "W. Preston Battle Is Under Arrest". The Jackson Sun. Associated Press. August 11, 1940.
- "Restrictions on Coverage". San Mateo Times. United Press International. July 19, 1968 – via NewspaperArchive.
- Stone, Doug (April 1, 1969). "Death Raises Ray's Hopes of New Trial". The Herald-News. Associated Press.

=== Magazines ===
- "Judges: On the Spot in the Spotlight". Time. Vol. 93, no. 2. January 10, 1969.
- Osborne, John (August 31, 1968). "The Ray Case". The New Republic. Vol. 159, no. 9. ISSN 0028-6583. EBSCOhost 10087390.
- "Trials: Maneuvers in Memphis". Time. Vol. 92, no. 15. October 10, 1968. ISSN 0040-781X.
