= Iloc =

Iloc or ILOC may refer to:

- Indian Law and Order Commission, United States government body focusing on legal issues in Native American Indian communities
- Initial Logistics Officers' Course, course for Supply Officer (Royal Navy)
- Interim Libor Oversight Committee, established by the British Bankers Association as a result of the Libor scandal
- Iloc Island, also known as Barangonan, barangay and island in Linapacan Municipality, Palawan Province, Philippines
- Cristina Casandra, maiden name Cristina Iloc, Romanian long-distance runner
