= Barack Obama assassination plot in Tennessee =

Plot to shoot presidential nominee Barack Obama in Tennessee in 2008

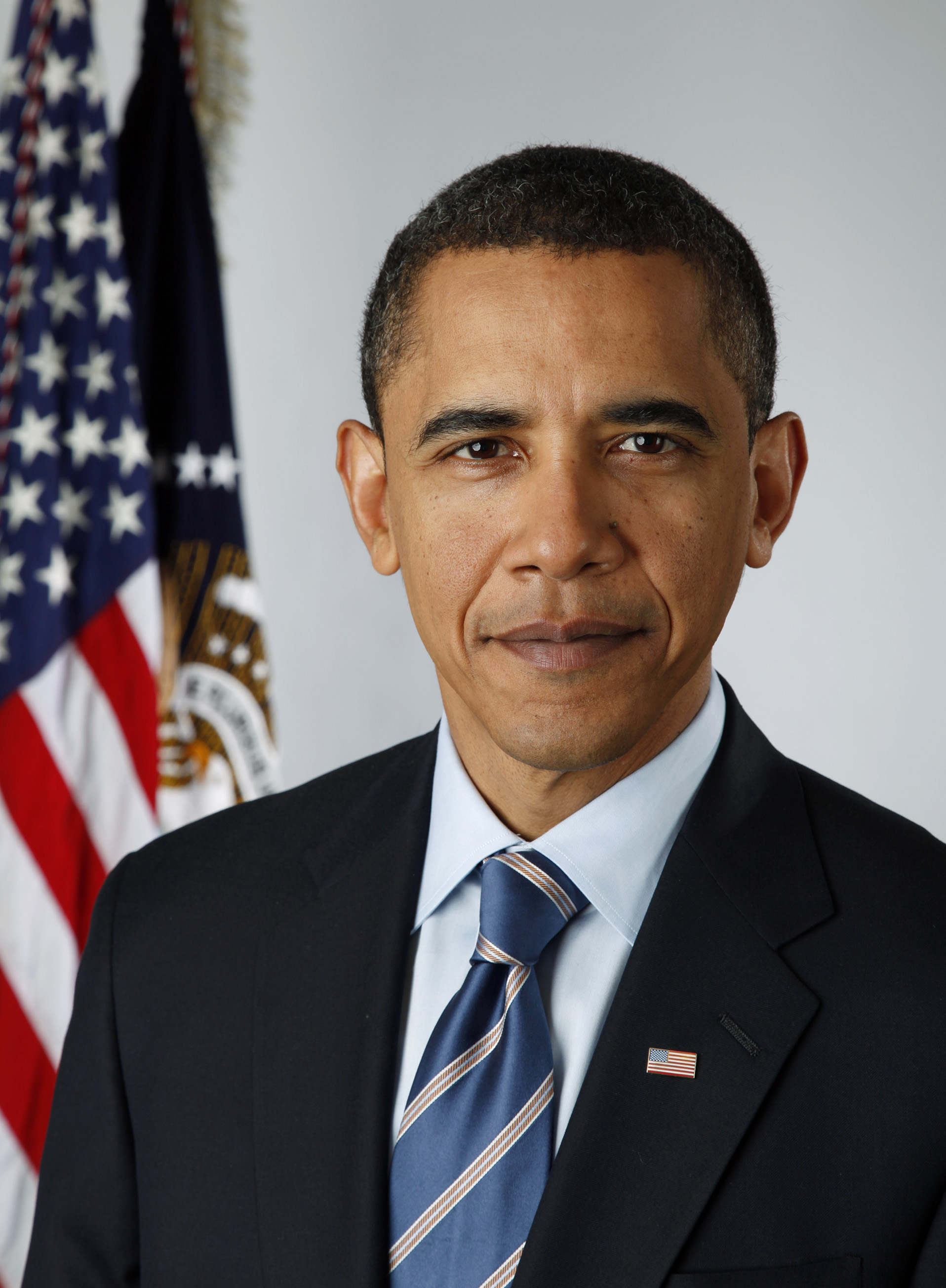
Barack Obama, the 44th President of the United States and target of an alleged assassination plot during his candidacy

The Barack Obama assassination plot in Tennessee was a plot by Paul Schlesselman and Daniel Cowart to assassinate Barack Obama, who was then the 2008 Democratic Party presidential nominee. The two men—both Neo-Nazi white power skinheads—spoke of killing Obama during a planned murder spree of 88 African Americans in Tennessee (in reference to the Nazi slogan Heil Hitler), 14 of whom were to be beheaded (a reference to the Fourteen Words slogan), many of whom were young students at an unidentified, predominantly black school.

Schlesselman and Cowart were arrested on October 22, 2008, and found to be in possession of several weapons. The men told authorities of their planned assassination and killing spree, and said they intended to rob a weapon store to obtain additional weapons and commit home robberies to help fund the operation. Although the United States Secret Service said it was taking the plot seriously, authorities were unsure how capable Schlesselman and Cowart were of carrying out the alleged plot. Both plotters pleaded guilty to various federal charges; Judge J. Daniel Breen of the United States District Court for the Western District of Tennessee sentenced Schlesselman to 10 years imprisonment on April 15, 2010, and Cowart to 14 years in prison on October 22, 2010.

== Investigation and arrests ==
Paul Schlesselman, 18, of Helena–West Helena, Arkansas, and Daniel Cowart, 20, of Bells, Tennessee, allegedly plotted to assassinate Barack Obama during his 2008 presidential campaign. Both Neo-Nazis, Schlesselman and Cowart were introduced to each other via the Internet in September 2008 by a mutual friend who shared their white supremacist beliefs. Within a month they began planning to kill Obama by driving their vehicle toward him as fast as they could and shooting at him from the windows. The murder was planned as the final act of violence of a killing spree in which the men planned to kill 88 African Americans by gunfire, mostly children at an unidentified, predominantly black school. They also planned to behead 14 of the 88 victims. The numbers were chosen for their special significance in the white power movement: 88 means "Heil Hitler", since H is the eighth letter in the alphabet, and 14 represents the 14-word white supremacist mantra, "We must secure the existence of our people and a future for white children."

Schlesselman and Cowart chatted on the Internet about how to carry out the operation. Schlesselman suggested using a sawed-off shotgun because it would be easy to maneuver; he also said he planned to steal a gun from his father. Prior to their arrest, the men decorated their car with a swastika and drew the numbers 88 and 14 on their hood using window chalk. Authorities believe the men may have planned to move from state to state to choose their victims. They also planned to wear white tuxedos and top hats during the assassination attempt.

The convicted assassination plotters: Paul Schlesselman (left) and Daniel Cowart (right)

On October 22, Schlesselman and Cowart shot at a glass window on the front door of the Allen Baptist Church in Brownsville, Tennessee. The two men bragged to a female friend about the shooting; the friend told her mother, who notified the Haywood County Sheriff's Department. Investigators traced the shell casings to Schlesselman and Cowart, and notified the Crockett County Sheriff's Department, who took the pair into custody after spotting the swastikas, slurs and 88 and 14 numbers on their car.

Police seized a rifle, a sawed-off shotgun and three pistols from the men at the time of the arrest. They were detained in Bells, Tennessee for a few days before being moved to another facility. During interrogation, the men told authorities of their plan to kill Obama. The Bureau of Alcohol, Tobacco, Firearms and Explosives handled the initial federal investigation of the case. The United States Secret Service became involved in the investigation once the assassination plot was discovered. The Federal Bureau of Investigation was also involved in the investigation. Both men were charged with illegal possession of a sawed-off shotgun, conspiracy to rob a firearms dealer and making threats against a presidential candidate; a superseding indictment additionally charged the pair with civil rights conspiracy and conspiracy, and charged Cowart with destruction of religious property and a related firearms charge. Authorities have found no evidence that anyone besides the two men were involved in the plot, but as of October 2008 authorities were said to be investigating the possibility.

Both Schlesselman and Cowart acknowledged that they would be killed as a result of the murders and insisted they were willing to die. Authorities said the pair planned to break into a gun shop to steal more weapons for their attack, and also bought nylon rope and ski masks at Walmart to use in a robbery or home invasion to fund the spree. Schlesselman and Cowart asked a friend to drive them to a house they planned to rob, but they canceled the robbery after getting scared by a dog and two vehicles in the driveway.

== Assessment of threat ==
Secret Service and other authorities said they were treating the plot very seriously, but acknowledged it did not appear to have moved to an advanced stage. Authorities said there did not appear to be any formal assassination plan and said they were unable to immediately assess how capable the men were of carrying out the attack. Federal authorities told the Associated Press they did not believe Schlesselman and Cowart had the means to carry out their threat. Barack Obama did not have any campaign appearances planned for Tennessee. One federal law enforcement official told the AP that plans did not include Obama's schedule or a specific time and place for the assassination because, "I don't think they had that level of detail." Authorities said they made several mistakes during their planning, including drawing too much attention to themselves with their car markings. Authorities also felt their inability to carry out a home robbery together indicated they would be unable to carry out a sophisticated assassination plot. When asked whether the alleged threats were real, Daniel Cowart's lawyer, Joe H. Byrd, told reporters, "White top hats and tuxedos? You tell me."

"They sound crazy, like a really bad movie – Quentin Tarantino gone awry. You listen to that, and you say, 'In a hundred thousand years, they never would have reached Obama.' But the reality is, they might have walked into a black high school and killed 20, 30, 40 people before anybody knew who they were."

— Mark Potok, director of the Southern Poverty Law Center

Fred Fielder, police chief in Helena–West Helena, Arkansas, said the alleged plot in Tennessee particularly concerned him due to the fact that 66 percent of the city's 12,200 population are African American; he said to reporters, "Predominantly black school, take your pick." Mark Potok, director of the Southern Poverty Law Center, described the plans and weapons arsenal as frightening, but said, "With the part about wearing top hats ... it gets a bit hard to take them seriously." Nevertheless, Potok said "the reality is, they might have walked into a black high school and killed 20, 30, 40 people before anybody knew who they were". An editorial in The Daily News Journal in Murfreesboro, Tennessee, said the plot emphasized a dark undercurrent of racism still alive in the United States, but said their chances of killing Obama were "almost nil. Their plot was so disorganized they appear to be candidates for 'dumb criminals', not calculating assassins".

Despite initial concerns about the plot, the Obama campaign was not immediately notified of the alleged plot; an Obama aide told ABC News, "They were given no heads up." Concerns were already strong about possible plots against Obama due to his status as the first African American presidential nominee for a major political party. The senator had been receiving Secret Service protection since May 2007, which was the earliest for any candidate, and authorities had already foiled an alleged assassination plot at the 2008 Democratic National Convention in Denver, Colorado.

== Histories of plotters ==
=== Paul Schlesselman ===
Paul Schlesselman is a high school dropout raised by a single father in Helena–West Helena, Arkansas. He hated his small Delta region hometown because of its predominantly black population. He had never had any problems with the law prior to the alleged Obama plot. He had a strong affinity for drinking and smoking.

Schlesselman publicly claimed white people were the master race and would often say "Sieg Heil" and "Heil Hitler." He spoke out against Obama, saying things like, "Obama would make the world suffer." His sister Kayla, who is two years younger than Paul, often argued with him about his racial beliefs. A few days before his arrest, a neighbor said he heard semiautomatic gunfire coming from an open field behind Schlesselman's house. After his arrest, Schlesselman's family expressed doubt that he seriously intended to carry out the plot; his father, Mike, said, "I think it's just a lot of talk. He would never do something like this." Kayla said she spoke with her brother after the charges were made public, and that Paul "said he's sorry about everything he's done."

=== Daniel Cowart ===
Daniel Cowart was raised in Bells, Tennessee. He had a strong interest in computers and had no criminal record. Cowart attended Jackson Christian School until 2006, but did not graduate. He was expelled from Jackson Christian after calling in a bomb threat. He applied for Jackson State Community College to study computers but, although his family believed he was indeed attending the school, he never provided documentation or pursued other steps to enroll there. Cowart worked at a Bells grocery store called the Bells Market Place for one year until May 2007 before moving to Texas in the spring of 2007 to live with friends he met on the Internet, but was unable to find work and returned to Bells to live with his grandparents a month later. Cowart worked and got along with several minority co-workers, who later expressed shock at his arrest. Mitchell Twitty, a black former co-worker, said of Cowart, "He treated me like we were best friends. I never, ever heard him make a racist remark." Twitty said Cowart tended to keep to himself and at times acted "a little strange." Other co-workers described him as hard-working and friendly, but said he did not have many friends. One family friend thought he was intelligent and full of potential: "I always saw him as a doctor or lawyer, or even a senator. He even had the potential to become what Obama is, running for president."

According to the Southern Poverty Law Center, Cowart belonged to the Supreme White Alliance, a white supremacist group. A photograph of Cowart celebrating the birthday of Adolf Hitler with other members was on the group's website. On the group's social networking site, Cowart described himself as "easygoing and easy to get along with, as long as you are white!" Cowart was allegedly kicked out of the group sometime prior to his arrest. The club's president, Steve Edwards of Central City, Kentucky, resigned due to the negative press following Cowart's arrest. Although Edwards acknowledged Cowart's membership, he said the group had no part in the plan, and claimed that the media exaggerated Cowart's connection to the group.

== Trials ==
A courtroom sketch of the first hearing and not guilty pleas of Paul Schlesselman (center) and Daniel Cowart (right)

A grand jury indicted Paul Schlesselman and Daniel Cowart on November 5, 2008, on federal charges of threatening to kill and inflict bodily harm upon a major presidential candidate, conspiracy, interstate unlawful transportation of an unregistered firearm, interstate transportation of a firearm with the intent to commit a felony, transporting a short-barreled shotgun across state lines without a license and unlawful possession of a short-barreled shotgun. Cowart was also charged with damaging religious property and use of a firearm during a crime of violence. On November 6, Schlesselman and Cowart pleaded not guilty before a federal magistrate in Memphis, Tennessee. The two were placed into federal custody without bail. The charges carry a maximum punishment of 50 years in prison and $540,000 in fines.

At the request of federal authorities, the men were placed on lockdown in their Obion County, Tennessee, jail cell for their own safety. The two men could leave their cell for only one hour to watch television or use the phone; authorities said they had caused no problems during their time in the jail.

Cowart's lawyer argued in a November 13 petition that the grand jury was racially stacked against him because it included only two white members, while "21 were African-American or of another race or races". Cowart's attorney argued his indictment should be dismissed because the jury could not "under the most modest constitutional scrutiny ... be considered fair, impartial and unprejudiced." In February 2009, a federal judge granted Schlesselman and Cowart limited access to court records on the grand jury selection and gave them permission to question procedures for selecting jurors. However, their defense attorneys were not allowed to challenge the resulting racial makeup of the actual jury. Also in February 2009, Schlesselman's lawyer asked the court to dismiss statements he previously gave police and evidence that he contended was wrongfully seized during searches of his home and another residence. Judge J. Daniel Breen of the United States District Court for the Western District of Tennessee refused this request in April. Schlesselman's counsel argued his assassination threat charges should be dropped because he said the alleged comments were made while in custody, so he could not have carried them out and they were not a "true threat". Judge Breen rejected that argument in March 2009.

The prosecution asked for two separate trials, which were expected to take place in Jackson, Tennessee, the area where the alleged crimes occurred.

== Guilty pleas and sentencing ==
Schlesselman pleaded guilty to two counts in the indictment against him plus one count of an information on January 14, 2010, with an agreed-upon sentence of ten years. Cowart pleaded guilty to eight of the nine counts in the superseding indictment on March 29, 2010. On April 15, 2010, Judge Breen sentenced Schlesselman to 10 years in federal prison. Judge Breen sentenced Cowart to 14 years in prison on October 22, 2010. The U.S. Justice Department said that Cowart could have been sentenced to a maximum 75 years, and Cowart was originally to be sentenced on August 13.

== Incarceration ==
Schlesselman served his sentence at the medium-security Federal Correctional Institution in McKean, Pennsylvania, and was released in July 2017. Cowart served his sentence at the medium-security Federal Correctional Institution in Williamsburg, South Carolina, and was released in January 2021.
