= Kevin Ritz =

Kevin Ritz may refer to:

- Kevin Ritz (baseball) (born 1965), American Major League Baseball pitcher
- Kevin G. Ritz (born 1974), American lawyer and judge
