= Overton Park Shell =

Amphitheater in Memphis, Tennessee, USA

Coordinates: 35.1457°N 89.9948°W

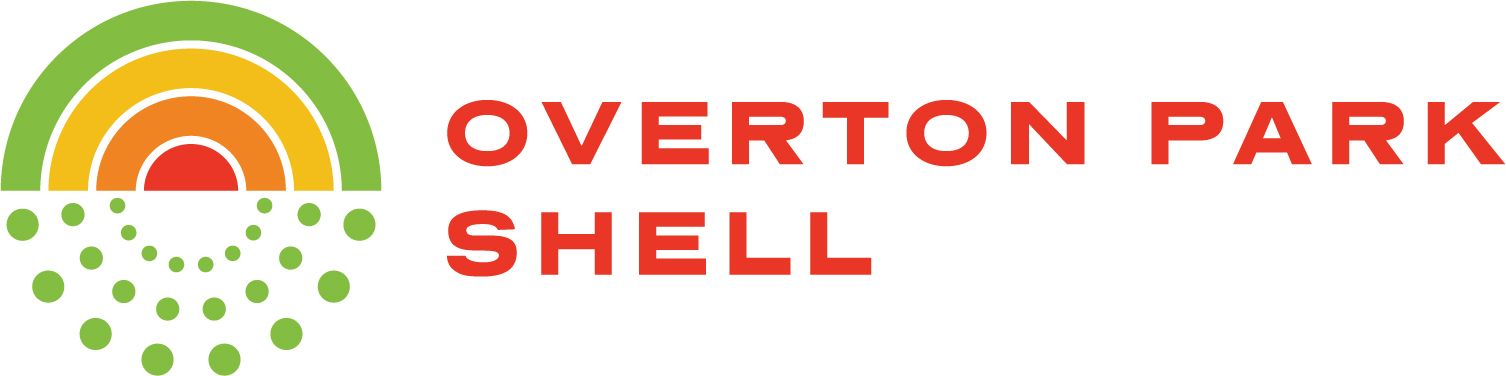

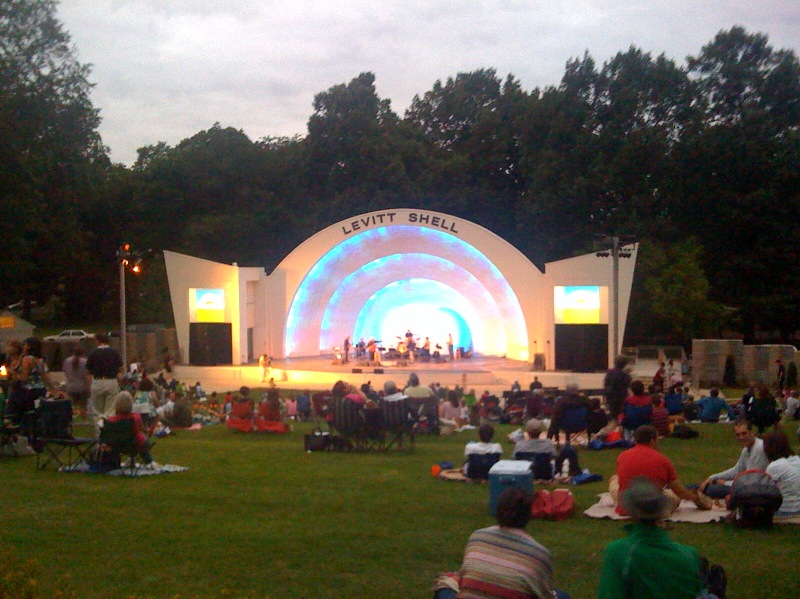
Overton Park Shell (formerly Levitt Shell), June 2009

The Overton Park Shell (formerly Levitt Shell, Shell Theater, and Memphis Open Air Theater) is an open-air amphitheater and museum located in Overton Park, Memphis, Tennessee. Elvis Presley gave his first paid concert there on July 30, 1954.

The Overton Park Shell was built in 1936 by the City of Memphis and the Works Progress Administration for $11,935, as part of the New Deal. Designed by architect Max Furbringer, it was modeled after similar shells in Chicago, New York, and St. Louis. The WPA built 27 band shells, the Overton Park Shell is one of only a few that still remain.

During the 1930s and 1940s, the Shell was the site of Memphis Open Air Theater orchestral shows, along with various light opera and musicals. However, on July 30, 1954, Elvis Presley opened for headliner Slim Whitman, and performed what music historians call the first-ever rock and roll show.

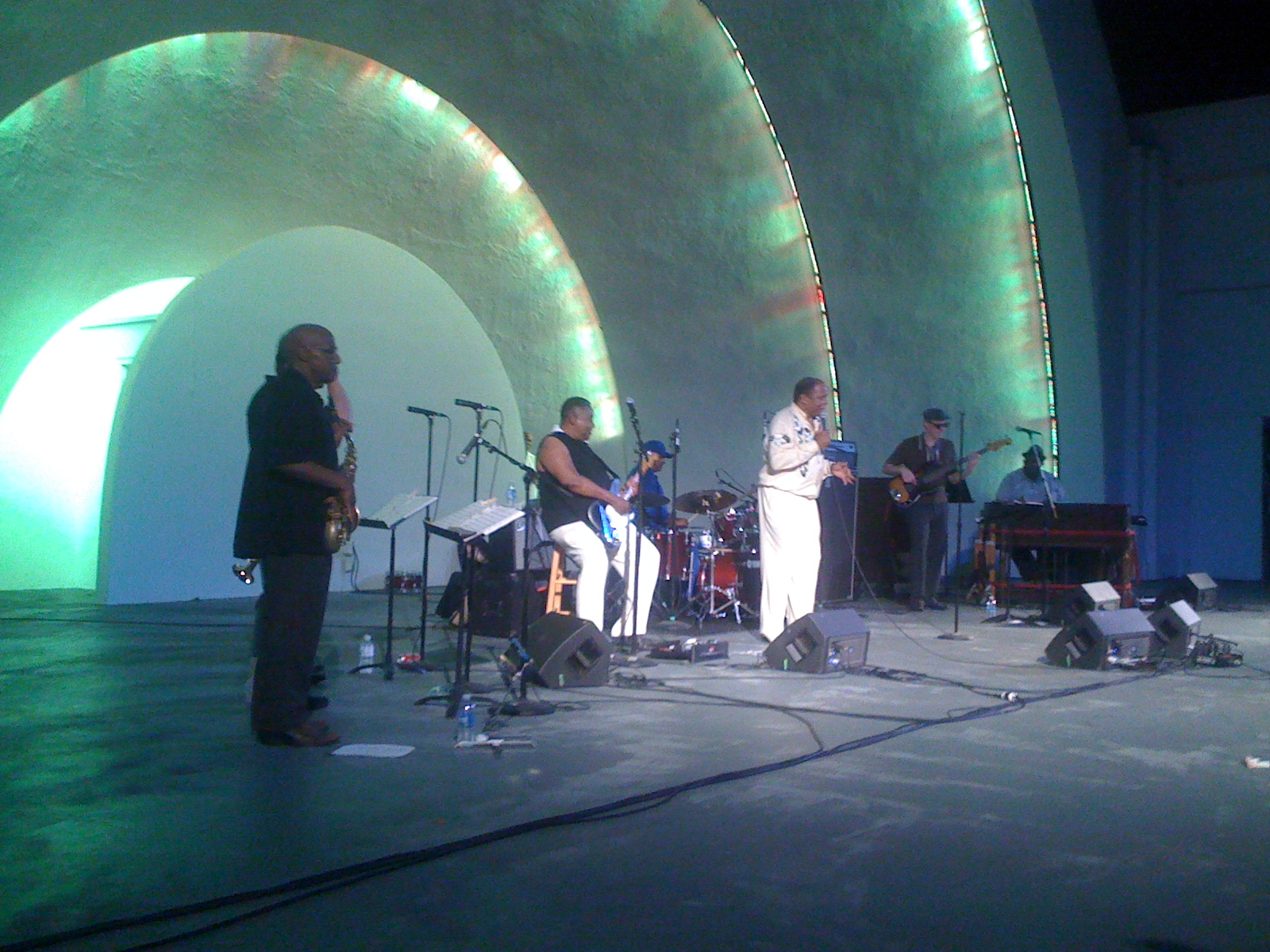
Musicians performing at the Overton Park Shell (formerly Levitt Shell) in June 2011

In the mid-1960s, the Shell was turned over to the Memphis Arts Center, who planned to raze it in order to build a $2 million theater. However, a campaign led by Noel Gilbert, long-time conductor of the Memphis Concert Orchestra, gathered 6,000 signatures in order to prevent its destruction. Later, in 1972, the Shell was nearly removed in order to build a parking garage, but was again saved by the outcry from the community.

In 1982, the National Conference of Christians and Jews proposed a restoration, and the Shell was renamed in honor of Raoul Wallenberg. However, they could not raise the necessary funds, so by 1984, the previous plan for a parking lot began once again. This time, the Shell was saved by Mayor Richard Hackett. He pledged to fund a renovation if a private group would spearhead an arts program.

In 1985, the Shell lay dormant for the first time in its history. In 1986, a corporation was formed by private citizens named Save Our Shell, Inc. For the following 20 years, Save Our Shell presented hundreds of free programs there.

In 2007, the Shell was renamed Levitt Shell at Overton Park and a large-scale renovation funded by the Levitt Foundation took place. The renovation was conducted by Memphis firm Askew Nixon Ferguson Architects with state-of-the-art audio and visual design. With the completion of the renovations on September 8, 2008, free concerts are now once again held in the Shell. The Shell offers concerts on Thursday, Friday, Saturday, and Sunday nights during its spring and fall seasons. In the summer of 2011, Indie Memphis debuted The Concert Film Series, presenting free concert films for the public on weekends during the summer months.

On March 3, 2022, the Levitt Shell was renamed back to its historic name of the Overton Park Shell aligning with an expansion of the Shell's mission to being music to underserved neighborhoods.

== See also ==
- List of contemporary amphitheatres
