= James Dale Todd =

American judge (born 1943)

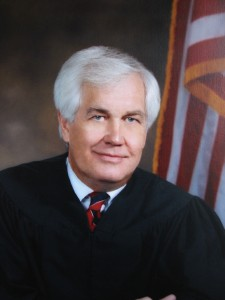

Senior Judge of the United States District Court for the Western District of Tennessee
- Incumbent
- Assumed office May 20, 2008

Chief Judge of the United States District Court for the Western District of Tennessee
- In office 2001–2007
- Preceded by: Julia Smith Gibbons
- Succeeded by: Jon Phipps McCalla

Judge of the United States District Court for the Western District of Tennessee
- In office July 11, 1985 – May 20, 2008
- Appointed by: Ronald Reagan
- Preceded by: Seat established by 98 Stat. 333
- Succeeded by: S. Thomas Anderson

Personal details
- Born: May 20, 1943 (age 82) Scotts Hill, Tennessee, U.S.
- Education: Lambuth University (BS); University of Mississippi (MCS); University of Memphis (JD)

James Dale Todd (born May 20, 1943) is a senior United States district judge of the United States District Court for the Western District of Tennessee.

== Education and career ==
Todd was born in Scotts Hill, Tennessee. He received a Bachelor of Science degree from Lambuth University in 1965, a Master of Combined Sciences from the University of Mississippi in 1968, and a Juris Doctor from the Cecil C. Humphreys School of Law at the University of Memphis in 1972. He was in private practice in Jackson, Tennessee from 1972 to 1983. He was a Circuit judge of the State of Tennessee from 1983 to 1985.

=== Federal judicial service ===
On June 5, 1985, Todd was nominated by President Ronald Reagan to a new seat on the United States District Court for the Western District of Tennessee created by 98 Stat. 333. He was confirmed by the United States Senate on July 10, 1985, and received his commission the following day. He served as Chief Judge from 2001 to 2007, assuming senior status on May 20, 2008. Judge Todd assumed inactive status on the 21st of September, 2021. He served the judiciary for 36 years.

== Sources ==
Legal offices
Preceded by Seat established by 98 Stat. 333	Judge of the United States District Court for the Western District of Tennessee; 1985–2008	Succeeded by S. Thomas Anderson
Preceded by Julia Smith Gibbons	Chief Judge of the United States District Court for the Western District of Tennessee; 2001–2007	Succeeded by Jon Phipps McCalla
