= Kevin G. Ritz =

American judge (born 1974)

Kevin Ritz
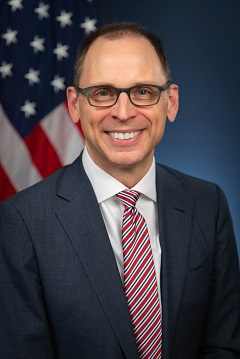

Judge of the United States Court of Appeals for the Sixth Circuit
- Incumbent
- Assumed office September 19, 2024
- Appointed by: Joe Biden
- Preceded by: Julia Smith Gibbons

United States Attorney for the Western District of Tennessee
- In office September 28, 2022 – September 18, 2024
- Appointed by: Joe Biden
- Preceded by: D. Michael Dunavant
- Succeeded by: D. Michael Dunavant

Personal details
- Born: Kevin Gafford Ritz; 1974 (age 51–52) Memphis, Tennessee, U.S.
- Education: University of Virginia (BA, JD); Georgetown University (MS)

Kevin Gafford Ritz (born 1974) is an American lawyer who has served as a United States circuit judge of the United States Court of Appeals for the Sixth Circuit since 2024. He previously served as the United States attorney for the Western District of Tennessee September 2022 to September 2024.

== Education ==
A native of Memphis, Ritz graduated from White Station High School. Ritz received a Bachelor of Arts from the University of Virginia in 1997, where he was a Jefferson Scholar. He later received a Master of Science from Georgetown University in 1999, and a Juris Doctor from the University of Virginia School of Law in 2004.

== Career ==
From 2004 to 2005, Ritz served as a law clerk for Judge Julia Smith Gibbons of the United States Court of Appeals for the Sixth Circuit. In 2005, he became an assistant United States attorney in the United States Attorney's office for the Western District of Tennessee. Ritz worked as a prosecutor in drug trafficking and gun-related crimes before moving to appellate law later in his career. He appeared as counsel in United States v. Castleman.

=== U.S. attorney for the Western District of Tennessee ===
On July 29, 2022, President Joe Biden announced his intent to nominate Ritz to be the United States attorney for the Western District of Tennessee. On August 1, 2022, his nomination was sent to the United States Senate, and the nomination was confirmed on September 22, 2022, by voice vote. Ritz was sworn in by Chief Judge S. Thomas Anderson on September 28, 2022. On September 18, 2024, he resigned as the US Attorney for the Western District of Tennessee to serve as a circuit judge of the Sixth Circuit.

=== Federal judicial service ===
On March 20, 2024, President Joe Biden announced his intent to nominate Ritz to serve as a United States circuit judge of the United States Court of Appeals for the Sixth Circuit. His nomination drew opposition from Senator Marsha Blackburn, who said the White House had abandoned discussions with her and fellow Tennessee senator Bill Hagerty about finding a nominee for the position. On March 21, 2024, his nomination was sent to the Senate. President Biden nominated Ritz to the seat being vacated by Judge Julia Smith Gibbons, who announced her intent to assume senior status upon confirmation of a successor. On April 17, 2024, a hearing on his nomination was held before the Senate Judiciary Committee. During his confirmation hearing, Republican senators questioned Ritz about an ethics complaint filed against him during his tenure as an Assistant United States Attorney. The complaint, brought by defense counsel, alleged that Ritz had misrepresented charges during a plea agreement in a criminal case. Ritz responded by stating that he was unaware of the ethics complaint at the time. Additionally, he faced inquiries about why federal gun charges were not pursued against a suspect allegedly involved in the fatal shooting of Memphis police officer Joseph McKinney. On May 9, 2024, his nomination was reported out of committee by an 11–10 party-line vote. On September 12, 2024, the United States Senate invoked cloture on his nomination by a 49–42 vote, with Senator Kyrsten Sinema voting against the motion. On September 16, 2024, his nomination was confirmed by a 48–46 vote, with Senator Sinema voting against confirmation. He received his judicial commission on September 19, 2024.

Legal offices
Preceded by Joe Murphy (Acting)	United States Attorney for the Western District of Tennessee; 2022–2024	Succeeded by Reagan Taylor Fondren (Acting)
Preceded by Julia Smith Gibbons	Judge of the United States Court of Appeals for the Sixth Circuit; 2024–present	Incumbent
