= J. Daniel Breen =

American judge (born 1950)

John Daniel Breen
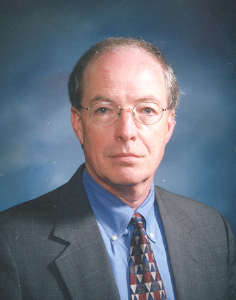

Senior Judge of the United States District Court for the Western District of Tennessee
- Incumbent
- Assumed office March 18, 2017

Chief Judge of the United States District Court for the Western District of Tennessee
- In office August 23, 2013 – March 18, 2017
- Preceded by: Jon Phipps McCalla
- Succeeded by: S. Thomas Anderson

Judge of the United States District Court for the Western District of Tennessee
- In office March 14, 2003 – March 18, 2017
- Appointed by: George W. Bush
- Preceded by: Julia Smith Gibbons
- Succeeded by: Mark Norris

Magistrate Judge of the United States District Court for the Western District of Tennessee
- In office 1991 – March 14, 2003

Personal details
- Born: John Daniel Breen; July 10, 1950 (age 76) Jackson, Tennessee, U.S.
- Education: Spring Hill College (BA); University of Tennessee (JD)

John Daniel Breen (born July 10, 1950) is a senior United States district judge of the United States District Court for the Western District of Tennessee.

== Education and career ==
Breen was born in Jackson, Tennessee. He received a Bachelor of Arts degree from Spring Hill College in 1972 and a Juris Doctor from the University of Tennessee College of Law in 1975. He was in private practice in Jackson from 1975 to 1991.

== Federal judicial service ==
He served as United States magistrate judge of the U.S. District Court for the Western District of Tennessee from 1991 to 2003 before being nominated as a federal judge.

On January 7, 2003, Breen was nominated by President George W. Bush to a seat on the United States District Court for the Western District of Tennessee vacated by Julia Smith Gibbons. He was confirmed by the United States Senate on March 13, 2003 and received his commission on March 14, 2003. He served chief judge from August 8, 2013 to March 18, 2017. He assumed senior status on March 18, 2017.

=== Notable case ===
Breen presided over the case of Daniel Cowart and Paul Schlesselman, the perpetrators in the Barack Obama assassination plot in Tennessee. In 2010, Breen convicted the two of conspiracy to murder Obama and other African-American people and sentenced Cowart and Schlesselman to 14 and 10 years in federal prison respectively; both suspects pleaded guilty to conspiracy to their charges.

== Sources ==
Legal offices
Preceded by Julia Smith Gibbons	Judge of the United States District Court for the Western District of Tennessee; 2003–2017	Succeeded by Mark Norris
Preceded by Jon Phipps McCalla	Chief Judge of the United States District Court for the Western District of Tennessee; 2013–2017	Succeeded by S. Thomas Anderson
