= Julia Smith Gibbons =

American judge (born 1950)

Julia Gibbons
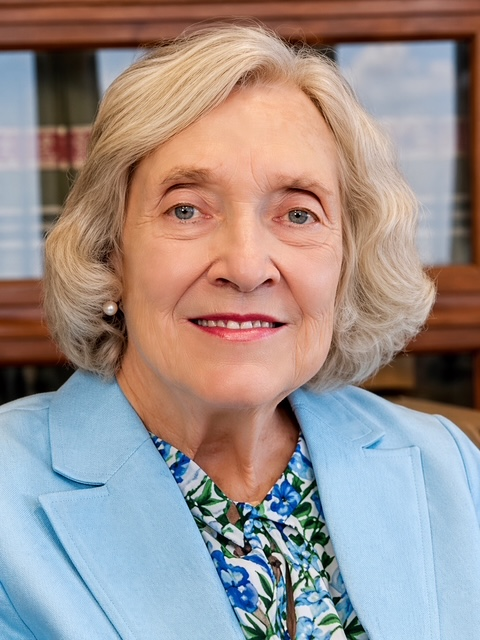
- Gibbons in 2026

Senior Judge of the United States Court of Appeals for the Sixth Circuit
- Incumbent
- Assumed office September 17, 2024

Judge of the United States Court of Appeals for the Sixth Circuit
- In office July 31, 2002 – September 17, 2024
- Appointed by: George W. Bush
- Preceded by: Gilbert S. Merritt Jr.
- Succeeded by: Kevin G. Ritz

Chief Judge of the United States District Court for the Western District of Tennessee
- In office 1994–2000
- Preceded by: Odell Horton
- Succeeded by: James Dale Todd

Judge of the United States District Court for the Western District of Tennessee
- In office June 7, 1983 – August 2, 2002
- Appointed by: Ronald Reagan
- Preceded by: Harry W. Wellford
- Succeeded by: J. Daniel Breen

Personal details
- Born: Julia Smith; 1950 (age 75–76) Pulaski, Tennessee, U.S.
- Spouse: Bill Gibbons
- Education: Vanderbilt University (BA); University of Virginia (JD)

Julia Smith Gibbons (née Smith; born in 1950) is a senior United States circuit judge of the United States Court of Appeals for the Sixth Circuit.

== Education and career ==
Gibbons was born and grew up in Pulaski, Tennessee. She attended public schools and was the valedictorian at Giles County High School, class of 1968. She received a Bachelor of Arts, magna cum laude, from Vanderbilt University in 1972 and was elected to Phi Beta Kappa. She received a Juris Doctor from the University of Virginia School of Law in 1975, where she was elected to Order of the Coif and was an editor of the Virginia Law Review.

After graduation, from 1975 to 1976, she served as a law clerk to the late Honorable William Ernest Miller, Circuit Judge of the United States Court of Appeals for the Sixth Circuit. She was admitted to the Tennessee bar in 1975. She was in private practice from 1976 to 1979 with the Memphis firm of Farris, Hancock, Gilman, Branan & Lanier. In 1979, she joined Tennessee Governor Lamar Alexander's staff as a legal advisor.

== Judicial service ==
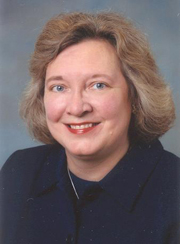
Gibbons in the 1990s

=== State Court service ===
In 1981, Governor Lamar Alexander appointed Gibbons to serve as a judge of the Tennessee Circuit Court for the Fifteenth Judicial Circuit, which at the time was Shelby County. She was elected to a full term in 1982. She is the first woman judge on a trial court in Tennessee.

=== District Court service ===
Gibbons was nominated by President Ronald Reagan on April 12, 1983, to a seat on the United States District Court for the Western District of Tennessee vacated by Judge Harry W. Wellford. She was confirmed by the United States Senate on June 6, 1983, and received commission on June 7, 1983. She served as Chief Judge from 1994 to 2000. Her service terminated on August 2, 2002, due to elevation to the court of appeals.

=== Court of Appeals service ===
Gibbons was nominated by President George W. Bush on October 9, 2001, to a seat on the United States Court of Appeals for the Sixth Circuit vacated by Judge Gilbert S. Merritt Jr. She was confirmed by the Senate on July 29, 2002, by a 95–0 vote. She received her commission on July 31, 2002. On August 18, 2023, she announced her intention to assume senior status upon confirmation of a successor. Gibbons assumed senior status on September 17, 2024.

=== Honors and distinctions ===
In 1985 and again in 2001, Gibbons was selected by Memphis attorneys to receive Outstanding Judge of the Year Award.

In 1992, Gibbons was selected by the Association for Women Attorneys to receive the Marion Griffin-Frances Loring Award. The same year, she was selected by Girls, Inc. to receive the "She Knows Where She's Going" award.

From 1994 to 1999, Gibbons was chair of the Judicial Resources Committee of the Judicial Conference.

In 2000, Gibbons was selected by the Memphis Bar Association to receive the Heroine for Women in the Law Award.

From 2000 to 2003, Gibbons was a member of the Judicial Panel on Multidistrict Litigation.

In 2005, Gibbons was appointed by Chief Justice William H. Rehnquist to chair the Budget Committee of the Judicial Conference of the United States. She served in that position until January 2018 and testified before Congress on behalf of the judiciary 16 times.

In 2017, she received the Pillars of Excellence Award from the University of Memphis Law Alumni Association. In 2015, she received the King's Award from Carnival Memphis.

In 2019, Gibbons was elected to the American Law Institute.

In 2021, Gibbons received the Devitt Award, the highest honor awarded to an Article III judge, for distinguished career and significant contributions to the administration of justice, the advancement of the rule of law, and the improvement of society as a whole.

In 2025, Gibbons was awarded the Lewis F. Powell Jr. Award for exemplary service in the areas of professionalism, ethics, civility, and excellence by the American Inns of Court.

Also in 2025, Gibbons was awarded the Women of Achievement Steadfastness award for a lifetime of service.

=== Notable cases ===
Gibbons wrote a concurring opinion in a 2–1 decision upholding Biden administration COVID-19 vaccine mandate for federal employees and contractors. In her concurrence, Gibbons highlighted the limited role of the federal judiciary in COVID policy.

In September 2026, Gibbons wrote the unanimous opinion holding that prediction market platform, Kalshi, failed to show that its sports event contracts were "swaps" under the Commodity Exchange Act (CEA) and that the CEA does not expressly or impliedly preempt Ohio's or Tennessee's gambling laws.

== Personal ==
Gibbons has been married since 1973 to Bill Gibbons, a former Shelby County district attorney. Shelby County contains Memphis. Bill Gibbons was a 2010 Republican gubernatorial candidate for the state of Tennessee. They have two adult children.

In 2003, she discussed her views on women in the judiciary at a University of Virginia School of Law event.

In 2009, she was invited to judge the Annual William Minor Lile Moot Court Competition at the University of Virginia School of Law.

In 2010, she was invited to judge the Ames Moot Court Competition at Harvard Law School.

In 2016, she was invited to judge the Bass Berry & Sims Moot Court Competition at Vanderbilt Law School.

== See also ==
- List of United States federal judges by longevity of service

Legal offices
Preceded by Harry W. Wellford	Judge of the United States District Court for the Western District of Tennessee; 1983–2002	Succeeded by J. Daniel Breen
Preceded by Odell Horton	Chief Judge of the United States District Court for the Western District of Tennessee; 1994–2000	Succeeded by James Dale Todd
Preceded by Gilbert S. Merritt Jr.	Judge of the United States Court of Appeals for the Sixth Circuit; 2002–2024	Succeeded by Kevin G. Ritz
