= Troy Eid =

American lawyer (born 1963)

United States Attorney for the District of Colorado
- In office 2006–2009
- President: George W. Bush
- Preceded by: John Suthers
- Succeeded by: John F. Walsh

Personal details
- Born: 1963 (age 62–63) Chicago, Illinois, U.S.
- Party: Republican
- Spouse: Allison H. Eid
- Children: 2
- Education: Stanford University (BA); University of Chicago (JD)

Troy A. Eid (born 1963) is an American attorney who served as United States Attorney for the District of Colorado from 2006 to 2009. He is also an adjunct professor of law at the University of Colorado Law School and University of Denver College of Law, where he teaches civil and criminal law with a focus on energy, natural resources, environmental regulation, and American Indian law.

== Early life and education ==
Troy Eid was born in 1963 in Chicago, Illinois to Edward and Sandra Eid. Edward Eid was an Egyptian who immigrated to the United States in 1957 with $100. Eid was raised in Wheat Ridge, Colorado and graduated from Stanford University in 1986, majoring in Russian Language and Literature. At Stanford, he was a research assistant for then-Associate Professor Condoleezza Rice.

Eid was elected editor-in-chief of the student newspaper, The Stanford Daily, and met his future wife, Allison Hartwell, while standing in line at a dorm cafeteria, where she was working as a food-service worker. Eid graduated in 1986 and, along with Hartwell, attended the University of Chicago Law School, where he earned his J.D. degree in 1991.

== Career ==
Eid is admitted to practice law in Colorado and the Navajo Nation, and his legal practice has focused on environmental, natural resources and federal Indian law. He was elected to membership in the American Law Institute, and has been recognized as one of the country's top practicing attorneys in both American Indian Law and environmental law by Chambers USA and was named by The Denver Post as one of 2007's "People to Watch". He passed the Navajo Nation bar examination in 2005 and now chairs the Committee on Training for the Navajo Nation Bar Association, which is responsible for legal education and the semi-annual bar exam on the country's largest Indian reservation.

Eid served as a law clerk to Edith Jones, Chief Judge of the Fifth U.S. Circuit Court of Appeals before entering private law practice in 1992 at Holme Roberts & Owen in Denver. From 1994 to 1999, Eid served as general counsel and chief operating officer of the National Information Infrastructure Testbed, an Internet technology research consortium formed to prototype advanced Internet applications in such areas as manufacturing, health care and environmental protection. In his capacity with the consortium, Eid directed engineering teams in North America, Europe and Asia.

=== Cabinet of Bill Owens ===
From 1999 to 2003, Eid served in the cabinet of then-Colorado Governor Bill Owens. Owens first appointed him chief legal counsel, where he oversaw the appointment of 34 state judges. Eid also served as executive director for the Department of Personnel & Administration, where he was responsible for Colorado's workforce of 70,000. Within days of the 1999 Columbine High School massacre, Eid was chosen to head an independent commission reviewing the Jefferson County law enforcement response. He also chaired the Colorado State's Board of Ethics, served on more than a dozen state boards during his time in Owens' cabinet and eventually served as chief administrative officer for Colorado's $13-billion state government. Owens described Eid as a model of integrity and uprightness while serving on the cabinet, and said of his work during that time, "It's a trial by fire, and when you survive it, typically it means you're going to be a very good lawyer." In recognition of his reforms to the state personnel system, Eid – who co-chaired a statewide commission with former Colorado Governor Richard D. Lamm (D) focused on the future of the state workforce – was awarded the "Outstanding Governmental Official of the Year Award" by both the Denver Hispanic Chamber of Commerce and the U.S. Hispanic Chamber of Commerce in 2003.

=== U.S. Attorney ===
When Colorado U.S. Attorney John Suthers was appointed the state's attorney general in December 2004, Eid was considered for his replacement, along with Larimer County District Attorney Stu VanMeveren and Arapahoe County District Attorney Jim Peters. Eid withdrew his name from consideration in January 2006, claiming the 13-month selection process was taking too long. Eid also withdrew in part because his wife, Allison Eid, was under consideration for the Denver-based Tenth U.S. Circuit Court of Appeals; the appointment would have created a conflict of interest since the U.S. Attorney oversees cases that often end up in the circuit court. Eid denied that his withdrawal had anything to do with Jack Abramoff, who had recently been fired from Greenberg Traurig and who was later sentenced to serve five years and ten months in prison on numerous fraud convictions. Eid insisted the fact that he had been selected for an internal ethics committee at the firm indicated that he didn't "have an Abramoff problem."

After withdrawing, Eid announced he would run for an at-large seat on the University of Colorado Board of Regents. In March 2006, Allison Eid was appointed Associate Justice on the Colorado Supreme Court, which removed the potential conflict because the U.S. Attorney does not get involved in state court matters. By that time, VanMeveren and Peters had also been removed from consideration for U.S. Attorney. When the White House asked for three more names, Senator Wayne Allard recommended only William Leone, who had been serving as acting U.S. Attorney since January 1, 2005. Leone, however, had been placed on a list of U.S. Attorneys to be fired for political reasons by Kyle Sampson, Chief of Staff to Attorney General Alberto Gonzales, and the White House instead asked Eid to reconsider. White House officials did not consider any other candidates besides Eid, who suspended his campaign for the University of Colorado Board of Regents in order to accept the U.S. Attorney position.

Eid was appointed to the position by President George W. Bush on June 9, 2006, making him the 41st United States Attorney for the state of Colorado and the first Arab-American ever appointed to serve as a U.S. Attorney. Eid, who said he was "totally stunned" by the invitation, was unanimously confirmed by the United States Senate on August 4, 2006. He served as Colorado's chief federal criminal prosecutor and represented the United States in civil cases where the government was party to a lawsuit. When Eid started the position with about 2,500 civil and criminal cases among 120 people, which he described as one of the heaviest caseloads outside of Washington, D.C. In addition to the cases, Eid said his priorities upon assuming the office were enforcing immigration laws, cracking down on drug trafficking, and creating a cyber-crime unit to fight child solicitation and pornography. In his first few weeks on the job, Eid visited with local, state and federal law enforcement and met one-on-one with everybody on his approximately 140-person staff.

In August 2008, Eid charged Marc Garold Ramsey, 39, for sending a threatening letter with a white powdery substance to 2008 Republican Party presidential nominee Senator John McCain. Although the powder was not lethal, Ramsey could face at least five years on charges of knowingly mailing a threat. Later that month, Eid also assessed an alleged assassination plot against then-Senator Barack Obama, the Democratic presidential nominee, after alleged plotters Shawn Robert Adolf, Tharin Robert Gartrell and Nathan Johnson were arrested just prior to the 2008 Democratic National Convention. Although the trio were charged with drug and weapon charges, Eid declared that the racist statements the suspects made following their arrests had not risen to the legal standard that would have allowed the filing of federal charges for threatening a presidential candidate. At an August 26 press conference, Eid dismissed the trio as drug addicts and said the "meth heads were not a true threat to the candidate, the Democratic National Convention or the people of Colorado."

Eid was accused by some of showing a political bias by prosecuting Ramsey without charging Gartrell, Adolf and Johnson, but Eid defended the decision; in a letter responding to the criticism, he wrote, "It would have been disgraceful for me or any other prosecutor to charge someone for a crime he didn't commit. ... There was no probable cause to support such a charge. To the extent you challenge my motives or those of the many investigating agents and career prosecutors who all reached this conclusion in this matter, you're mistaken." Eid aides admitted, however, that the decision not to charge was at least in part because they did not believe a jury would convict them based on the reliability of Johnson's testimony; Jeffrey Dorschner, Eid's spokesman, said a defense attorney "would tear him apart."

Eid also focused extensively on Native American issues while serving as Colorado's U.S. Attorney. He partnered with the Southern Ute Indian Tribe and the Director of its Justice Department, Janelle Doughty, to create a regional program to train tribal, state and local law enforcement officers to enforce federal criminal law on Indian reservations in Southwestern Colorado. This program later expanded to include officers from more than 35 Indian tribes from 17 states. Eid's pilot program gained the attention of Senator Byron L. Dorgan, who praised it as a national success story in strengthening criminal justice in Indian Country and used it as the model for the bill's expanded training provisions.

=== Joseph Nacchio trial ===
Eid was appointed as the United States Attorney for the District of Colorado on June 9, 2006. Among the cases Eid inherited from his predecessor, acting U.S. Attorney Bill Leone, was the ongoing prosecution of Joseph Nacchio, the former chairman of the board and chief executive officer of Qwest Communications International indicted on 42 counts of insider trading. Nacchio was accused of selling $101 million of Qwest stock in the first five months of 2001 despite knowledge from company insider's that Qwest's financial condition was deteriorating. Leone had been lead prosecutor on the Nacchio case since 2002, but several members of the prosecution team had left throughout the years due to infighting that threatened to derail the case. Due to the problems with the Nacchio team and prior failures to achieve convictions against other Qwest employees, U.S. Department of Justice officials became concerned about the Denver office's ability to get a conviction and considered taking over the prosecution. Eid persuaded them otherwise in part by hiring Cliff Stricklin, who prosecuted the case against former Enron officials Jeffrey Skilling and Kenneth Lay in response to the Enron scandal. Although Stricklin was difficult to woo following his Enron success, Eid successfully hired Stricklin in August 2006 as First Assistant U.S. Attorney of Colorado and the head prosecutor for the Nacchio case

The prosecution team, which had about seven months to prepare for trial, also included Justice Department litigator Colleen Conry; Colorado Assistant U.S. Attorney Kevin Traskos; former tobacco litigation task force prosecutor Leo Wise; and Colorado Assistant U.S. Attorney James Hearty, the only prosecutor who served on Leone's original Qwest team. The prosecutors reportedly got along very well and heeded lessons from previous unsuccessful corporate fraud, which prompted Stricklin to describe them as "the very best team" he ever worked with. The trial began in March 2007 and in April, Nacchio was convicted of 19 of the 42 counts of insider trading. On July 28, he was sentenced to six years in prison and ordered to pay a $19 million fine and forfeit the $52 million he grossed on the illegal sales. Eid described the Nacchio case as the largest insider trading case in United States history; regarding the verdict and sentencing, Eid said, "This is what the American criminal justice system is all about" and said, "'Convicted felon Joe Nacchio' has a very nice ring to it."

Nacchio appealed the verdict, arguing that then-federal Judge Edward Nottingham had improperly excluded a defense witness from offering expert evidence during the trial. In a two-to-one decision on March 17, 2008, the Tenth U.S. Circuit Court of Appeals overturned all 19 guilty counts and ordered a new trial before a different judge. Eid appealed the decision to the full appellate court, and recruited Edwin Kneedler, principal deputy solicitor general for the Department of Justice and a veteran Supreme Court attorney, to represent the government in the case; Eid said of Kneedler, "We wanted the best and we got him." In February 2009, an en banc panel of the Tenth Circuit reversed the previous panel's decision and reinstated all 19 convictions.

=== Operation Central ===
Beginning in 2007, Eid oversaw the nationally recognized Operation Central, a successful joint U.S.-Mexican prosecution of criminal trafficking in endangered sea turtles. A three-year international investigation led to multiple arrests on charges of smuggling the skins of endangered sea turtles and other protected animals for use in making boots, belts and wallets. Eid described as "unprecedented" the cooperation between U.S. Fish and Wildlife Service agents and Mexican authorities.

In recognition of the success of Operation Central, the U.S. Fish and Wildlife Service and the U.S. Department of Justice were later awarded the Animal Welfare Institute's prestigious Clark R. Bavin Law Enforcement Award for this multi-year undercover investigation of unlawful international trafficking in sea turtle parts and products. The award was presented by Willem Wijnstekers, Secretary-General of the Convention on the International Trade in Endangered Species of Wild Fauna and Flora (CITES).

Operation Central was the largest probe ever of the unlawful commercial exploitation of highly endangered sea turtles – all of which are listed under Appendix I of CITES which bans international trade. Operation Central was planned and designed to infiltrate two widely active segments of the black market wildlife trade – sea turtle skin and skin products moving illegally from Mexico to the United States and sea turtle shell and shell products being smuggled to the United States from China. The investigation also documented the role of U.S. retailers in the unlawful commercial exploitation of other CITES-listed species (including caimans and lizards) in the exotic boot trade. The government of Mexico coordinated enforcement activities with the Fish and Wildlife Service that also resulted in arrests in Mexico.

The Clark R. Bavin Wildlife Law Enforcement Awards are named in memory of the late Chief of the U.S. Fish and Wildlife Service's Office of Law Enforcement, who pioneered the agency's highly effective use of covert investigations and "sting" operations to uncover illegal wildlife trade. The awards have traditionally been presented by the Secretary-General of CITES during meetings of the Conference of the Parties.

=== Resignation and Attorney General bid ===
With the election of President Barack Obama, Eid was expected to be replaced as U.S. Attorney, as is the custom with a change of presidential administrations. On January 7, 2009, Eid announced he would resign as U.S. Attorney on January 19, the day before President Barack Obama's inauguration, and run for Colorado Attorney General in 2010. Eid sought to fill the position expected to be vacated by John W. Suthers, who was planning to run for governor or U.S. Senate. However, shortly after Eid's resignation, Suthers announced that he would seek re-election as attorney general rather than run for higher office. In response, Eid dropped plans to run for attorney general, describing Suthers as one of his close friends and claiming, "Challenging John is not part of my equation." Eid rejoined the private firm Greenberg Traurig, where he had worked from 2003 to 2006.

Eid also served on the Indian Law and Order Commission.

== Personal life ==
Eid is married to Allison Hartwell Eid, who was appointed an Associate Justice of the Colorado Supreme Court by then-Governor Bill Owens in February 2006. The Eids have two children. Allison has described her husband as one who enjoys and embraces challenges; citing his decision to take the Navajo Nation's bar exam during his time as a private attorney, she said, "What 41-year-old man is going to willingly take the bar? He's just someone who jumps in and says, 'I'm going to meet this challenge.'"

Eid competes regularly in trail races, marathons and other distance-running events.

== Writings ==
Eid wrote the article "Strategic Democracy-Building: How U.S. States Can Help" for The Washington Quarterly magazine, anthologized in the 2003 book, Winning Hearts and Minds: Using Soft Power to Undermine Terrorist Networks. He also wrote a 2007 article for The Federal Lawyer entitled "Beyond Oliphant: Strengthening Criminal Justice in Indian Country."

Eid and one of his former students at CU Law School, Carrie Covington Doyle, co-authored an article concluding that the federal criminal justice system in Indian Country illegally discriminates against the rights of Native Americans in violations of the Equal Protection Clause of the U.S. Constitution. Among other things, Eid and Doyle noted that the punishments imposed on Native American offenders, especially juveniles, are systematically harsher than punishments for identical or very similar offenses committed by non-Indians. "Separate But Unequal: The Federal Criminal Justice System in Indian Country," 81 University of Colorado Law Review 1067 (Fall 2010).
