= Jon Phipps McCalla =

American judge (1947–2026)

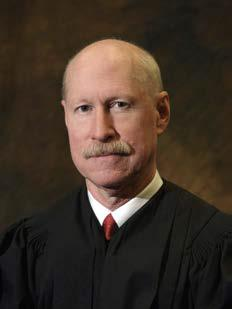

Senior Judge of the United States District Court for the Western District of Tennessee
- In office August 23, 2013 – May 15, 2026

Chief Judge of the United States District Court for the Western District of Tennessee
- In office 2008–2013
- Preceded by: James Dale Todd
- Succeeded by: J. Daniel Breen

Judge of the United States District Court for the Western District of Tennessee
- In office February 10, 1992 – August 23, 2013
- Appointed by: George H. W. Bush
- Preceded by: Seat established by 104 Stat. 5089
- Succeeded by: Sheryl H. Lipman

Personal details
- Born: February 16, 1947 Memphis, Tennessee, U.S.
- Died: May 15, 2026 (aged 79) Baltimore, Maryland, U.S.
- Education: University of Tennessee (BS); Vanderbilt University (JD)

Jon Phipps McCalla (February 16, 1947 – May 15, 2026) was a United States district judge of the United States District Court for the Western District of Tennessee.

== Early life and career ==
McCalla was born in Memphis, Tennessee, on February 16, 1947. He received a Bachelor of Science degree from the University of Tennessee in 1969 and was in the United States Army from 1969 to 1971, achieving the rank of Lieutenant. He received a Juris Doctor from Vanderbilt University Law School in 1974. He was a law clerk to Judge Bailey Brown of the United States District Court for the Western District of Tennessee from 1974 to 1975. He was in private practice in Memphis from 1975 to 1992.

=== Federal judicial service ===
On August 1, 1991, McCalla was nominated by President George H. W. Bush to a new seat on the United States District Court for the Western District of Tennessee created by 104 Stat. 5089. He was confirmed by the United States Senate on February 6, 1992, and received his commission on February 10, 1992. He was chief judge from 2008 to 2013, managing the third-busiest federal judicial district in the United States. In April 2018 McCalla decided a case involving an important constitutional challenge to Tennessee's controversial billboard law. He took senior status on August 23, 2013.

During McCalla's tenure as chief judge from 2008 to 2013, his work helped to make the United States District Court for the Western District of Tennessee one of the more efficient federal courthouses in the country, according to various statistical measurements including time to trial (one of the lowest) and trials completed (the second highest).

=== Reprimand ===
In 2000, several attorneys who practiced before Judge McCalla and in his courtroom filed complaints against him alleging misconduct. Specifically, the lawyers accused McCalla of being verbally abusive. McCalla admitted the allegations. He agreed to a formal reprimand which was imposed by the Sixth Circuit Judicial Council in 2001. McCalla was only one of seven federal judges to be formally disciplined in the 2000s.

== Death ==
McCalla died in Baltimore on May 15, 2026, at the age of 79.

== Sources ==
Legal offices
Preceded by Seat established by 104 Stat. 5089	Judge of the United States District Court for the Western District of Tennessee; 1992–2013	Succeeded by Sheryl H. Lipman
Preceded by James Dale Todd	Chief Judge of the United States District Court for the Western District of Tennessee; 2008–2013	Succeeded by J. Daniel Breen
