= Bill Gibbons =

American lawyer

2nd Commissioner of the Tennessee Department of Safety and Homeland Security
- In office January 2011 – September 2016
- Appointed by: Bill Haslam
- Preceded by: David Mitchell
- Succeeded by: David Purkey

District Attorney General of the 30th Judicial District of Tennessee
- In office 1996 – c. 2010
- Appointed by: Don Sundquist

Personal details
- Born: Arkansas, U.S.
- Party: Independent
- Spouse: Julia Smith Gibbons
- Children: 2
- Education: Vanderbilt University

Bill Gibbons is the Executive Director at The Public Safety Institute at the University of Memphis. Gibbons was previously Commissioner of the Tennessee Department of Safety and Homeland Security until 2016. He was appointed to the post by the Governor of Tennessee, Bill Haslam. He is a former District Attorney General of the 30th Judicial District of Tennessee, which includes Shelby County and the city of Memphis, Tennessee. He was a Republican candidate in the 2010 Tennessee gubernatorial election, but dropped out on March 26, 2010, due to "lack of sufficient campaign funds to go forward."

== Early life ==
Gibbons was born and raised on a small farm in southern Arkansas, the youngest of six children. When Gibbons was 4, his father, an alcoholic, abandoned him and his family, leaving it impoverished. As a result, he grew up without a telephone or TV despite them being common American household conveniences during his childhood in the 1950s and 1960s. Also, his mother had to sell their chairs, tables, silverware, dishes, and other staple household necessities to pay for food and electricity. Eventually, his mother lost the small farm to foreclosure. As a child, Gibbons was a habitual truant that skipped school; but it was his fourth grade school teacher that convinced him that education was the path out of poverty.

Even as his mother sold the bookcases containing the books, his mother refused to sell the books in their home, because she believed that literacy and education were the key to escaping poverty. One of the set of books she refused to sell was a six-volume biography of Abraham Lincoln by Carl Sandburg. Gibbons is convinced that this was one of the major reasons he became a Republican.

At the age of 15, an older brother packed up Bill and the family and moved to Memphis, where he attended Central High School. While in high school, Bill Gibbons was asked by former Tennessee Governor Lamar Alexander, who at the time was running Howard Baker's campaign for the U.S. Senate, to startup and a head a group called Young Tennesseans for Baker in Shelby County.

After high school, Bill attended college at Vanderbilt University, where he served as president of the Vanderbilt College Republicans. He went on from there to also earn a law degree from Vanderbilt University Law School, after which he entered private law practice in Memphis.

== Career ==
Bill Gibbons joined Governor Bill Haslam’s cabinet as Commissioner for the Department of Safety and Homeland Security in January 2011. Prior to his appointment as Commissioner, Gibbons served as Shelby County District Attorney General for approximately 14 years.

As Commissioner, Gibbons oversaw the agency’s law enforcement, driver licensing, and homeland security responsibilities. His major priorities include reducing traffic fatalities through the data-driven DUI and seat belt enforcement efforts of the Tennessee Highway Patrol, interdiction of drug trafficking on our interstates, providing driver license services, and providing training and other support to local law enforcement on homeland security matters.

Gibbons chaired a public safety subcabinet composed of all state executive branch departments and agencies involved in public safety to develop a single, consistent state agenda to combat crime. The group has developed a Public Safety Action Plan for Governor Haslam that focuses on holding offenders accountable, prevention and intervention efforts, victim assistance, and homeland security challenges.

Gibbons began his state government career in 1979 as a special policy assistant for former Governor Lamar Alexander and then returned to private law practice in 1981. He rejoined state government in 1996, after former Governor Don Sundquist named him District Attorney General in order to fill an unexpired term. Gibbons was then elected to a pair of eight-year terms in 1998 and 2006.

His accomplishments as DA included a no plea bargaining policy on the most violent crimes, his joint effort with other law enforcement to crack down on possession of guns by convicted felons, and his creation of special prosecution units to focus on gang violence, drug trafficking, domestic violence and child abuse.

From 2009-2014, Gibbons chaired Operation: Safe Community, an initiative to reduce crime in Memphis and Shelby County. Gibbons has also served on the Board of Directors for the National District Attorneys Association (NDAA), the American Prosecutors Research Institute (APRI), as well as the U. S. Department of Justice’s Coordinating Council on Juvenile Justice and Delinquency Prevention. Currently, he serves on the board of the Memphis/Shelby County Crime Commission.

Prior to serving as District Attorney, Gibbons was a partner in the law firm of Evans & Petree and served in part-time elective positions as a member of both the Memphis City Council and the Shelby County Commission.

== Personal ==
Bill Gibbons is married to Julia Smith Gibbons, a federal judge on the United States Court of Appeals for the Sixth Circuit. She was first appointed as a federal judge by President Ronald Reagan.

== See also ==
- 2010 Tennessee gubernatorial election
