= D. Michael Dunavant =

American lawyer (born 1970)

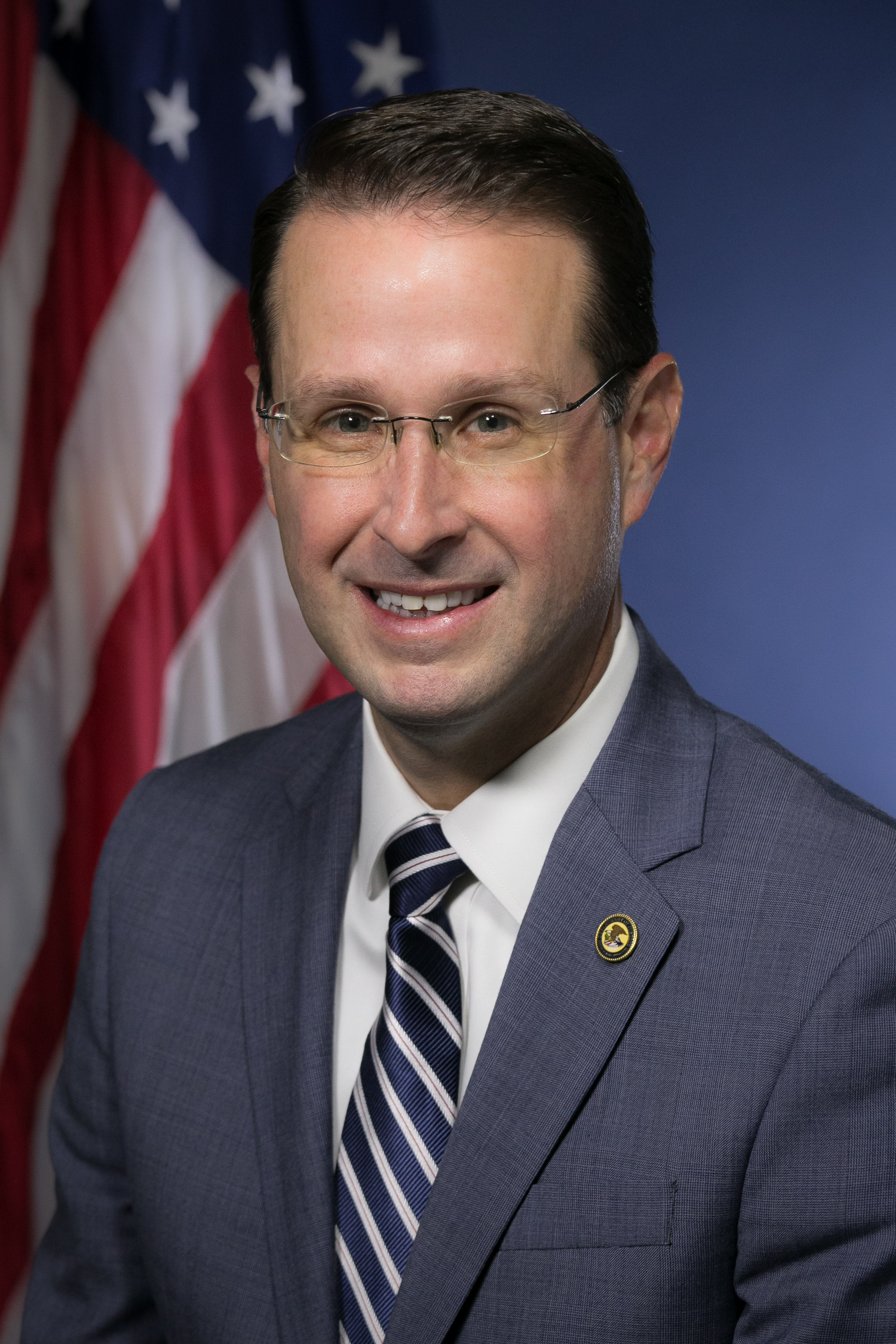

United States Attorney for the Western District of Tennessee
- Incumbent
- Assumed office October 10, 2025
- President: Donald Trump
- Preceded by: Kevin G. Ritz

United States Attorney for the Western District of Tennessee
- In office September 21, 2017 – February 28, 2021
- President: Donald Trump; Joe Biden
- Preceded by: Edward L. Stanton III
- Succeeded by: Kevin G. Ritz

Personal details
- Born: David Michael Dunavant; 1970 (age 55–56) Millington, Tennessee, U.S.
- Spouse: Marianne
- Children: 1
- Education: University of Tennessee (BA); University of Mississippi (JD)

David Michael Dunavant (born 1970) is an American lawyer who served as the United States Attorney for the Western District of Tennessee from 2017 to 2021. He formerly served as the District Attorney General for the 25th Judicial District in Tennessee from 2006 to 2017.

== Education and legal career ==
Dunavant received his Bachelor of Arts from the University of Tennessee in 1992 and his Juris Doctor from the University of Mississippi School of Law in 1995.

== Career ==
Dunavant worked as a lawyer at the firm of Carney, Wilder & Dunavant from 1995 to 2006. From 2006 to 2017, Dunavant served as District Attorney General for the 25th Judicial District in Tennessee.

=== United States Attorney ===
In June 2017, Dunavant was nominated by President Donald Trump to become the United States Attorney for the Western District of Tennessee. He was confirmed by the United States Senate on September 14, 2017; becoming the chief law-enforcement officer for the 22 counties that make up Tennessee's western judicial district, which includes the Memphis area.

According to Ryan J. Reilly in HuffPost, Dunavant is "an unflinching critic of criminal justice reformers." Dunavant tweeted, "The U.S. does have a very large prison population: not because too many innocent people are incarcerated; but because too many people commit serious, usually violent crimes. That's why most people are imprisoned in America. Period. Full stop." He criticized Alice Marie Johnson, a 64-year-old federal prisoner whose sentence was commuted by Trump in 2018 to time served, after Johnson had been imprisoned for 21 years of a life sentence for involvement in a cocaine trafficking operation. Dunavant opposed a request by Johnson to end her term of supervised release; he called Johnson a drug "kingpin" and said, "Uninformed members of the public continue to celebrate her criminality."

On February 8, 2021, he along with 55 other Trump-era attorneys were asked to resign. On February 10, Dunavant announced his resignation, effective February 28.
