= The Memphis 13 =

Children who integrated Memphis schools in 1961

The Memphis 13 are the group of young children who integrated the schools of Memphis, Tennessee. On October 3, 1961, 13 African-American first grade students were enrolled in schools that were previously all white. The schools that the students attended were Bruce, Gordon, Rozelle, and Springdale elementary schools.

The students attended the following schools: Bruce Elementary (Dwania Kyles, Harry Williams, Michael Willis); Gordon Elementary (Alvin Freeman, Sharon Malone, Sheila Malone, Pamela Mayes); Rozelle Elementary (Joyce Bell, E.C. Freeman, Leandrew Wiggins, Clarence Williams); Springdale Elementary (Deborah Ann Holt; Jacqueline Moore).

When these students desegregated Memphis City Schools, there was no violence like the violence witnessed in other parts of the South. There was neither a great deal of news coverage nor a great deal of public discussion about what was going on. Rev. Samuel Kyles was the chairman of the local NAACP's education committee at the time noted that the decision to use first-graders instead of high school students was intentional. Kyles believed that first graders were not tainted and therefore were better suited to integrate the schools.

The story of the Memphis 13 has been made into a documentary by Professor Daniel Kiel, a professor at the University of Memphis Cecil C. Humphreys School of Law. The documentary is 35 minutes and consists of interviews with the 13 students and their family members about their experiences and feelings during the time. In October 2015, historical markers were placed at the four schools students attended. The students have been honored as part of the City of Memphis "Be the Dream" awards program at Mason Temple in January 2016 and were honored at screenings of the documentary at Harvard Law School, the Little Rock Reel Civil Rights Film Festival, Thurgood Marshall School of Law, and the University of Mississippi School of Law.
