= University of Memphis, School of Law campus =

Building in Tennessee, United States

University of Memphis School of Law building
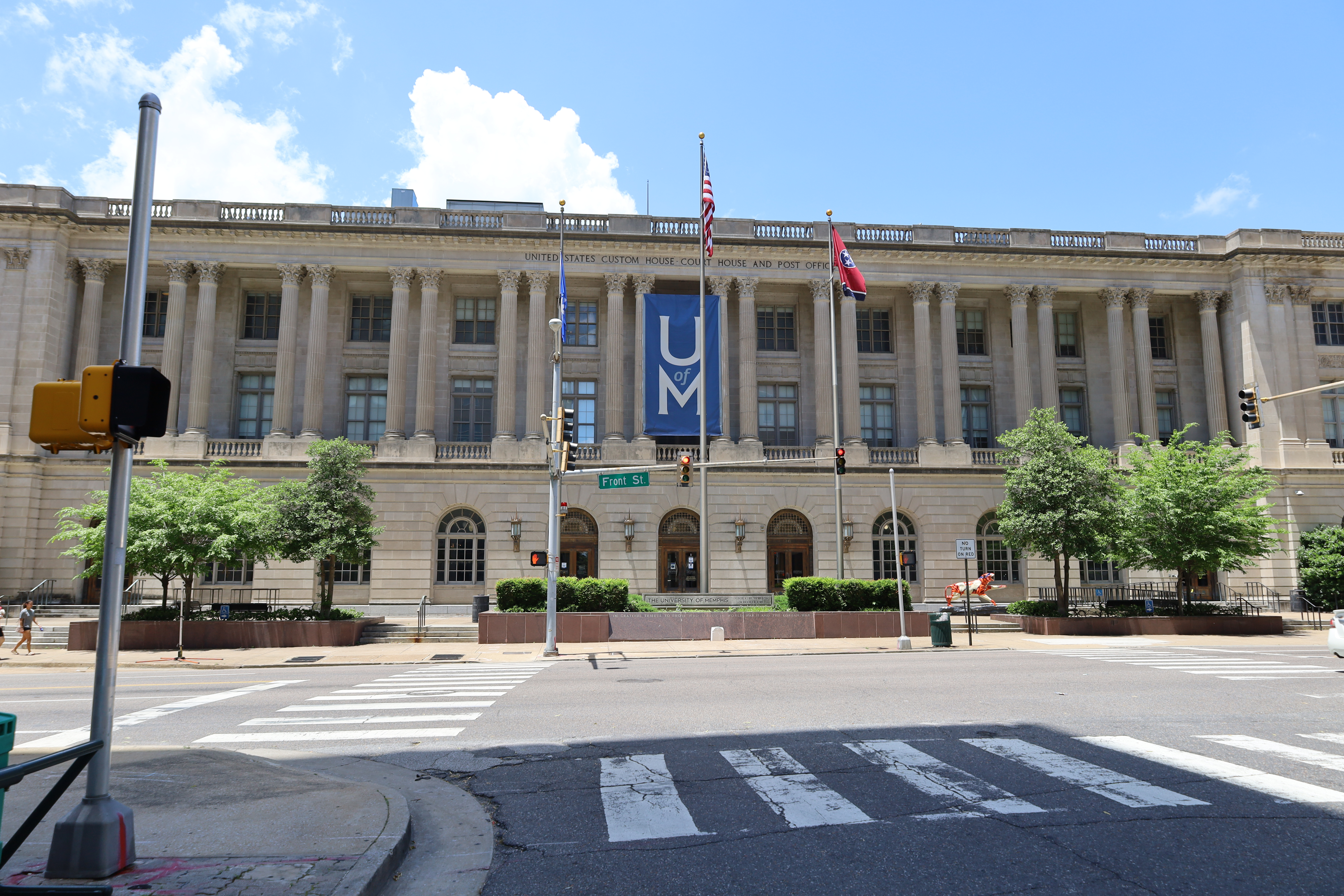
- The building in 2022
- Interactive map of the University of Memphis; School of Law building area
- Former names: U.S. Customs House (Memphis) & U.S. Post Office
- Alternative names: Customs House

General information
- Architectural style: neo-classical
- Location: 1 North Front Street, Memphis, Tennessee
- Coordinates: 35.14565°N 90.05469°W
- Construction started: 1876
- Completed: 1885
- Renovated: 1903, 1930

Technical details
- Floor count: 5
- Floor area: 169,000 square feet (15,700 m^{2})

Design and construction
- Architect: numerous
- U.S. Post Office-Front Street Station
- U.S. National Register of Historic Places
- Location within Tennessee Location within the United States
- Coordinates: 35.14565°N 90.05469°W
- Area: less than one acre
- Architectural style: Italian Villa, Renaissance Revival
- NRHP reference No.: 80003873
- Added to NRHP: June 30, 1980

The University of Memphis, School of Law building (also commonly known as the Customs House, Post Office, or Courthouse reflecting its prior uses) is a 5-story former federal building, located in downtown Memphis. As of 2010, the building is owned entirely by the University of Memphis and houses its law school. It is located at the corner of Front Street and Madison Avenue. It has 169,000 square feet (15,700 m^{2}) of usable space that has been re-purposed as classrooms, offices, and administrative space. One of the original courtrooms from the building's former use as a courthouse has been restored as the University of Memphis moot courtroom. The building is made of steel and concrete, and employs many decorative elements including Tennessee marble, granite, and detailed plaster work.

== Location ==
The building, which has an address of 1 North Front Street, sits just west of Court Square, Memphis. The building's location on a natural bluff overlooking the Mississippi River affords it magnificent westerly views of the river, including Mud Island, and Arkansas. Because of its location on a natural promontory, the building was not affected by the 2011 Mississippi River floods.

== History ==
The building was built originally in the 1880s to house the U.S. Customs House, but it provided space for several other federal offices. Locally, it became known as the "Customs House." Over the following one hundred years, the U.S. federal building served many purposes, including as the federal courthouse, customs house, and post office. The building underwent a large expansion in 1929–1930, creating new a new facade on Front Street.

It was placed on the National Register of Historic Places in 1980.

== Current Use ==
After extensive award-winning renovations, in 2010 the building became home to the University of Memphis, School of Law. As such, it houses the University of Memphis Law Review offices, as well as the University of Memphis, Legal Aid Clinic.

== Gallery ==
View of downtown Memphis, looking west on Madison Ave, 1920.

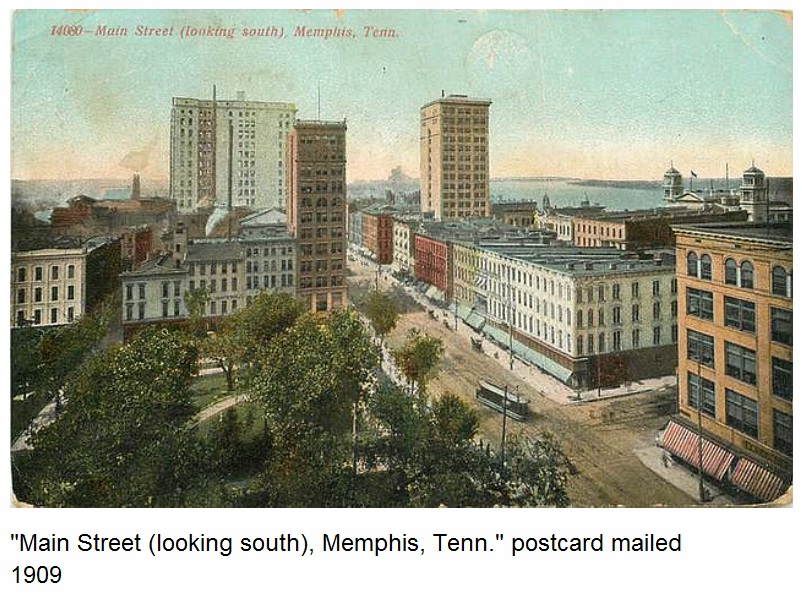
Downtown Memphis in 1909, overlooking Court Square.

View of downtown Memphis in 1907 from the Mississippi River.

View of Madison Avenue, and Customs House and Post Office in 1907.

View of building in 1913, looking North.

View of building in 1914, looking West.

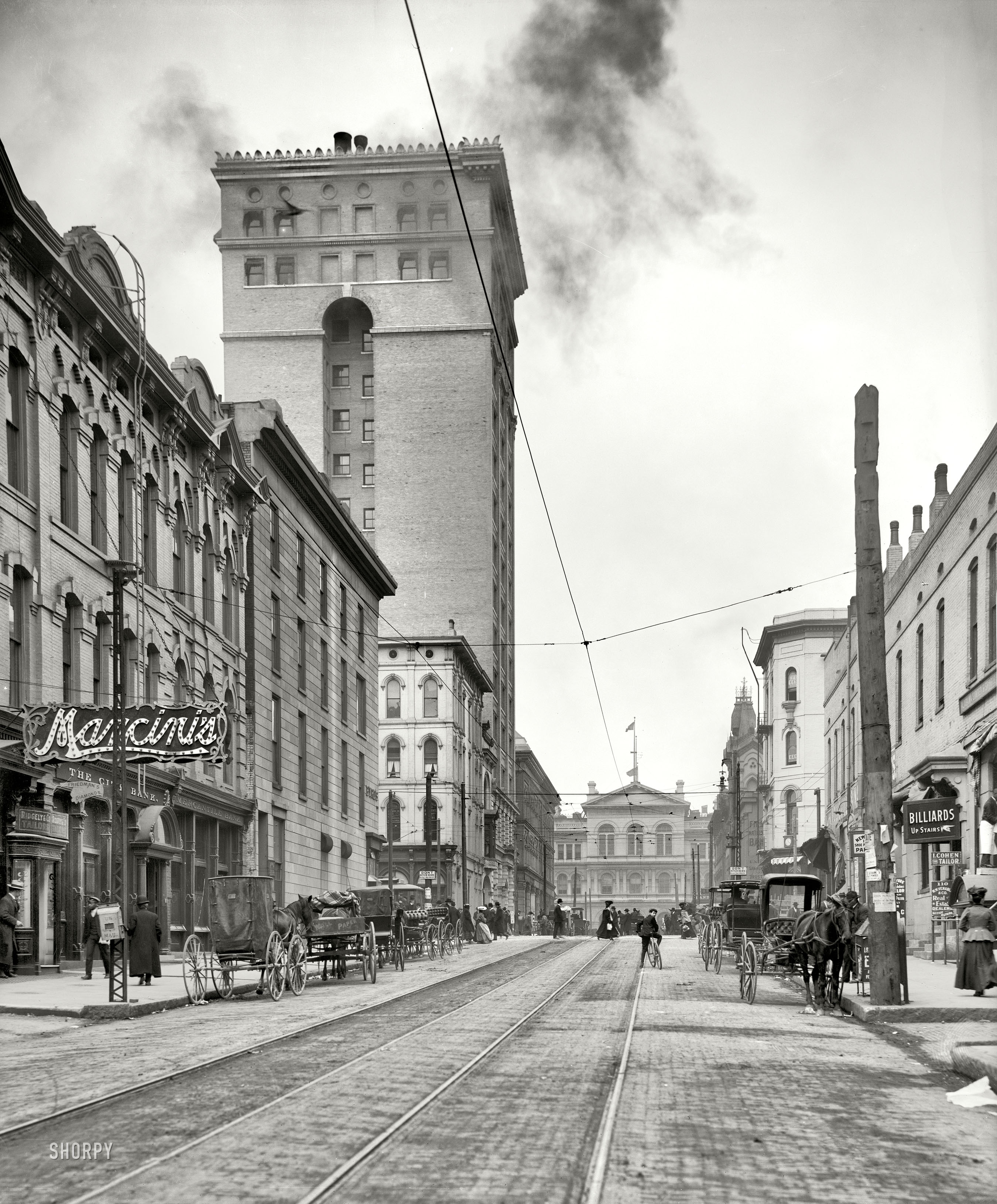
View west on Madison Avenue, ending with the Customs House (1906)

== See also ==
- University of Memphis, School of Law
- List of tallest buildings in Memphis
- Downtown Memphis
