= Barack Obama assassination plot in Denver =

Assassination plot to shoot Barack Obama at the 2008 Democratic National Convention

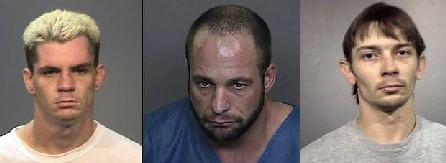
Booking shots of Tharin Gartrell, Nathan Johnson and Shawn Adolf following their arrest for plotting to assassinate Barack Obama

Shawn Robert Adolf, Tharin Robert Gartrell and Nathan Dwaine Johnson plotted to assassinate Barack Obama, then the 2008 Democratic Party presidential nominee. The trio allegedly planned to shoot then Senator Obama with a high-powered rifle during the Democratic National Convention in Denver, Colorado.

The alleged motive for the attempted assassination was a white supremacist belief that an African American should not be elected President of the United States. Gartrell was arrested August 24, 2008, and found to be in possession of rifles and other weaponry; Adolf and Johnson were arrested shortly thereafter. In a televised interview after his arrest, Johnson identified Adolf as the man who allegedly hatched the assassination plot and planned to be the shooter.

Although their suspected white supremacist affiliations led federal authorities to investigate possible ties to a larger group, authorities later downplayed the trio as drug addicts who had little chance of carrying out the plot. The three men were charged with drug and weapons charges, but did not face federal charges of threatening a presidential candidate.

== Investigation and arrests ==
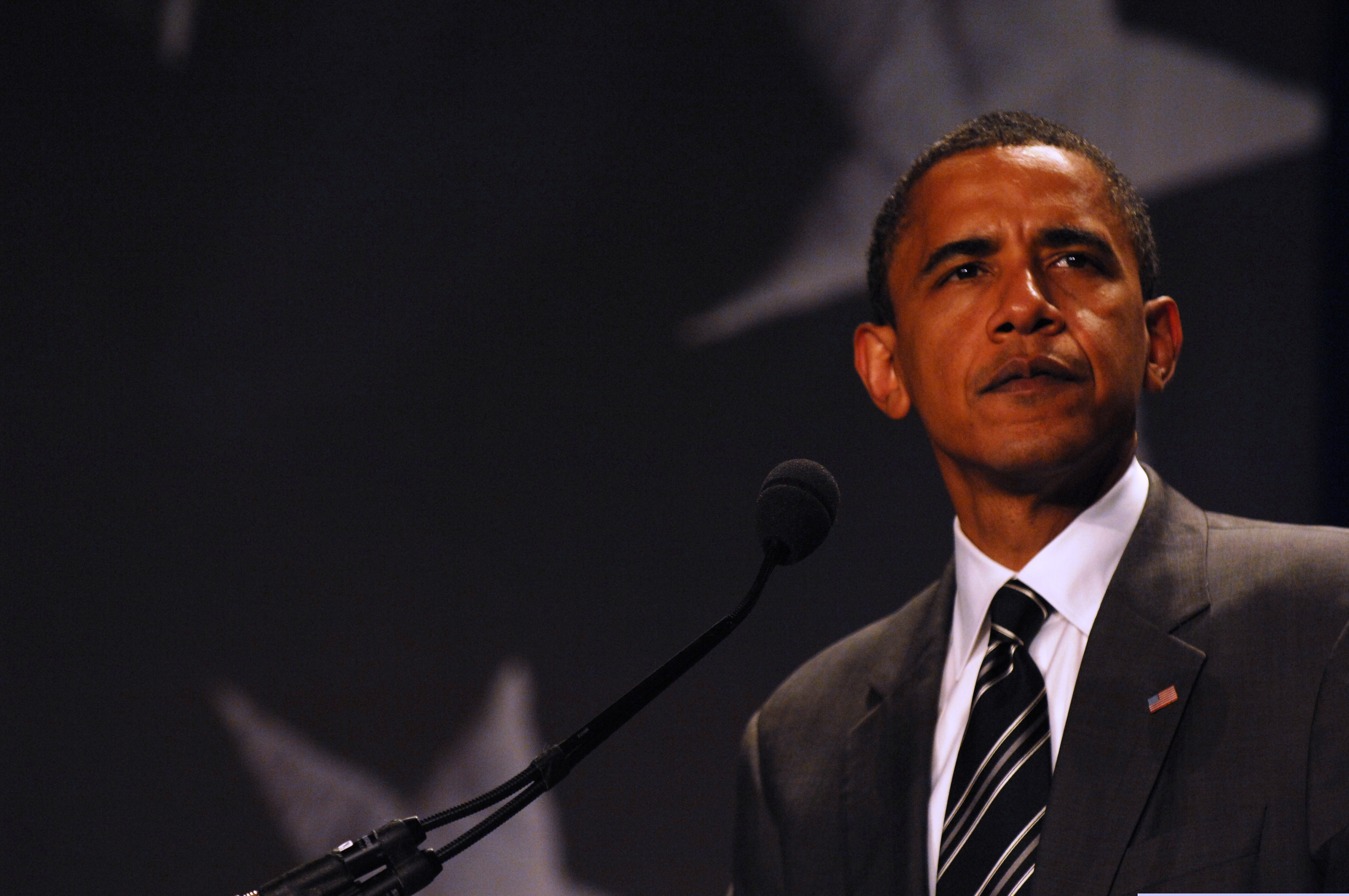
The three men allegedly planned to shoot Barack Obama during his acceptance speech at the 2008 Democratic National Convention.

In August 2008 Tharin Robert Gartrell, 28, his cousin Shawn Robert Adolf, 33, and their friend Nathan Dwaine Johnson, 32, allegedly came to Denver, Colorado, specifically to kill then-Senator Barack Obama at the Democratic National Convention. The men came to Denver before Obama arrived there, and rented a room at the Hyatt Regency, where they mistakenly believed Obama was staying (in fact, Obama was staying at another Denver hotel). Federal authorities began an investigation into the trio after they made alleged racist threats against Obama while taking methamphetamine in the hotel room. A woman present for their conversation, who was not identified by a police affidavit, told Colorado State Patrol officers they "could not believe how close he was to becoming President". they spoke about killing the presumed Democratic presidential nominee, and that Adolf allegedly said, "No nigger should ever live in the White House." A woman in the group said it would be a "suicide mission", and it would be best done by hiding a gun inside a hollowed-out television video camera, a method used in the 1992 Kevin Costner film, The Bodyguard. Security had already been increased for Obama due to low-grade fears of possible assassination attempts against the first African American major party presidential candidate. Authorities did not identify the woman who informed on the trio, nor did they disclose whether she was charged with a crime.

Gartrell was driving to buy cigarettes when he was arrested at about 1:30 a.m. on August 24. Police in Aurora, Colorado, a suburb east of Denver, pulled over his rented 2008 blue Dodge Ram truck, which was swerving erratically. Police found a Ruger Model M77 Mark II .22-250 bolt-action rifle with an attached scope and bipod, and a Remington Model 721 270 bolt-action rifle with an attached hunting scope. One of the rifles was fitted with a silencer. Police also found two wigs, three fake IDs, camouflage clothing, a bulletproof vest, two walkie-talkies and 4.4 grams of what appeared to be methamphetamine in the truck. The truck contained enough drug-making equipment for the vehicle to be considered "a mobile lab". At least one of the rifles had been reported stolen. Gartrell was under the influence of methamphetamine when arrested. He was found to be driving on a suspended license, and was carrying a false Colorado identification card with a Centennial, Colorado address. Gartrell was using crutches at the time of his arrest.

"He don't belong in political office. Blacks don't belong in political office. He ought to be shot."

— Nathan Johnson

Gartrell told an agent with the Bureau of Alcohol, Tobacco, Firearms and Explosives that the weapons belonged to his cousin Adolf, and he led police to the hotels where Adolf and Johnson were staying. Johnson was arrested at the Hyatt Regency Tech Center, at about 4:30 a.m. Adolf was arrested at the Cherry Creek Hotel in Glendale at about 5 a.m. Adolf jumped out of a sixth-story hotel window when police arrived. He fell four stories onto the second-floor roof of the hotel kitchen, then jumped again onto the ground around the hotel. He broke his ankle in the fall, but tried to run before police found him a short distance away. Adolf, who was hospitalized shortly after his arrest, was wearing body armor when police apprehended him. He told police this was because "someone wanted to shoot him". Like Gartrell, Johnson and Adolf were found to be under the influence of methamphetamine during their arrests. During interviews with police, both men made racist statements similar to those allegedly made in their earlier hotel room discussions.

== Johnson implicates Adolf ==
Johnson told the United States Secret Service he rented the Hyatt hotel room at Adolf's request and that he believed "without a doubt" that Adolf came to Denver to kill Obama. According to a police affidavit, "Johnson said the only reason for such killing would be because Obama is black." During an August 25 interview with KCNC-TV, a CBS owned-and-operated television station in Denver, Johnson first denied being personally involved with the plot and, when asked whether he felt the men had serious plans to go through with the assassination, he said, "Looking back at it, I don't want to say yes, but I don't want to say no." Eventually, however, he admitted the other two men had planned a killing when he said, "Yeah, they were here to do that, to assassinate him ... it's about as hard for me to swallow as it is for you to understand." Johnson said the plan was for Adolf to, "shoot Obama from a high vantage point using a [rifle] sighted at 750 yards". Johnson said the shooting was to take place during Obama's acceptance speech on August 28 at the Democratic National Convention in INVESCO Field at Mile High. Johnson told the station, "He don't belong in political office. Blacks don't belong in political office. He ought to be shot."

Johnson said Adolf previously made comments about killing any African American who ran for president: "He made a comment in the past. I can't honestly tell you how long ago in the past, that he didn't believe a black should be the leader of this country." According to Johnson, Adolf said he was already wanted for other crimes, so it "wouldn't matter if he killed Obama". Johnson also claimed Adolf said he would never be taken alive and wanted to "go down in a blaze of glory". Law enforcement sources told KCNC-TV that one of the suspects "was directly asked if they had come to Denver to kill Obama. He responded in the affirmative." Johnson said Gartrell came to Denver to help Adolf execute the plan, and Gartrell later admitted to police that in talking about Obama, they referred to "shooting on a grassy knoll," a reference to the assassination of John F. Kennedy. However, Johnson also told the reporter he came to the conclusion that there was an assassination plot planned only after being questioned by the Federal Bureau of Investigation multiple times, adding, “I told them I had no idea there was a plot, a plan, a conspiracy or anything like that ... When the feds came and laid out everything on the table and how it looked, I was in agreement that they could have been up here to do something like that." Johnson later rejected additional media interview requests.

== Assessment of threat ==
FBI Special Agent Robert Sawyer initially said there was probable cause to believe the trio were conspiring to kill Obama, based on searches of their hotel rooms and cars. However, United States Attorney Troy Eid said the racist statements the suspects made following their arrests had not risen to the legal standard that would have allowed the filing of federal charges for threatening a presidential candidate, an offense that falls under the same statute as threatening the president of the United States. Prosecutors also said they had insufficient evidence that they had the means to carry out a plot to kill Obama. Eid said the searches of the suspects' rooms and computers turned up no evidence of a plot or conspiracy. Eid and his aides said the decision not to press charges of threatening a presidential candidate was at least in part because they did not believe a jury would convict them based on the reliability of Johnson's testimony. Jeffrey Dorschner, Eid's spokesman, said a defense attorney “would tear him apart”. Although Eid would be accused of racism and political posturing for not seeking the charge, Eid said, "The 'political' thing to have done in this case, of course, would have been to charge all three defendants with making a threat against Obama and then quietly drop those charges later — expedient, Machiavellian and self-serving, but also illegal, unethical and immoral."

The Secret Service, ATF, FBI, a U.S. Joint Terrorism Task Force and the U.S. Attorney's office investigated the plot. Inconsistencies with the men's stories led investigators to downgrade the threat the men presented to Barack Obama. During a press conference on August 26, federal authorities said Gartrell, Adolf and Johnson had possessed little, if any, chance of actually assassinating Obama. Eid described the alleged plot as "more aspirational, perhaps, than operational", and said, "We're absolutely confident that the meth heads were not a true threat to the candidate, the Democratic National Convention or the people of Colorado." Officials did not believe the men had a clear path to hit the stage from outside the convention hall, and had little chance of getting to Obama outside the convention, especially since they were incorrect about which hotel Obama would be staying at. FBI officials said no additional precautions were planned in response to the alleged plot because security had already been high due to the prospect of threats from extremist groups. Secret Service protection for Obama began after the Senator received a death threat in 2007, marking the earliest time a candidate received such protection before being nominated. Obama and his campaign officials did not comment on the arrests, just as Obama had usually declined discussing death threats against him in the past since entering the presidential race.

"We're absolutely confident that the meth heads were not a true threat to the candidate, the Democratic National Convention or the people of Colorado."

— U.S. Attorney Troy Eid

Although officials downplayed the level of threat the trio presented to Obama, they said they planned further investigations into how a gang of supposedly small-time criminals collected such a massive arsenal. Authorities believed the men had at least some white supremacist involvement, although experts at the Southern Poverty Law Center, which tracks the radical right, said no evidence existed linking any of them to a white supremacist group. Nevertheless, the possible connections prompted FBI officials, who originally considered the threat "relatively minor", to develop stronger concerns about whether the motives from the three plotters could have been connected to a larger organization. The FBI stated that with an African American candidate for president, "you are certainly going to look at the general threat picture against any candidate and factor in the threats posed by those who preach hate and racism."

William Boone, political science professor at Clark Atlanta University, said drug influence should not have been cause for prosecutors to dismiss the threat, and that drugs have historically caused criminals to follow through with such crimes and schemes. Boone said, "The whole idea of just dismissing it as not credible is incredible. ... It’s surprising given the whole history of crime and drug use in the United States."

== Histories of alleged plotters ==
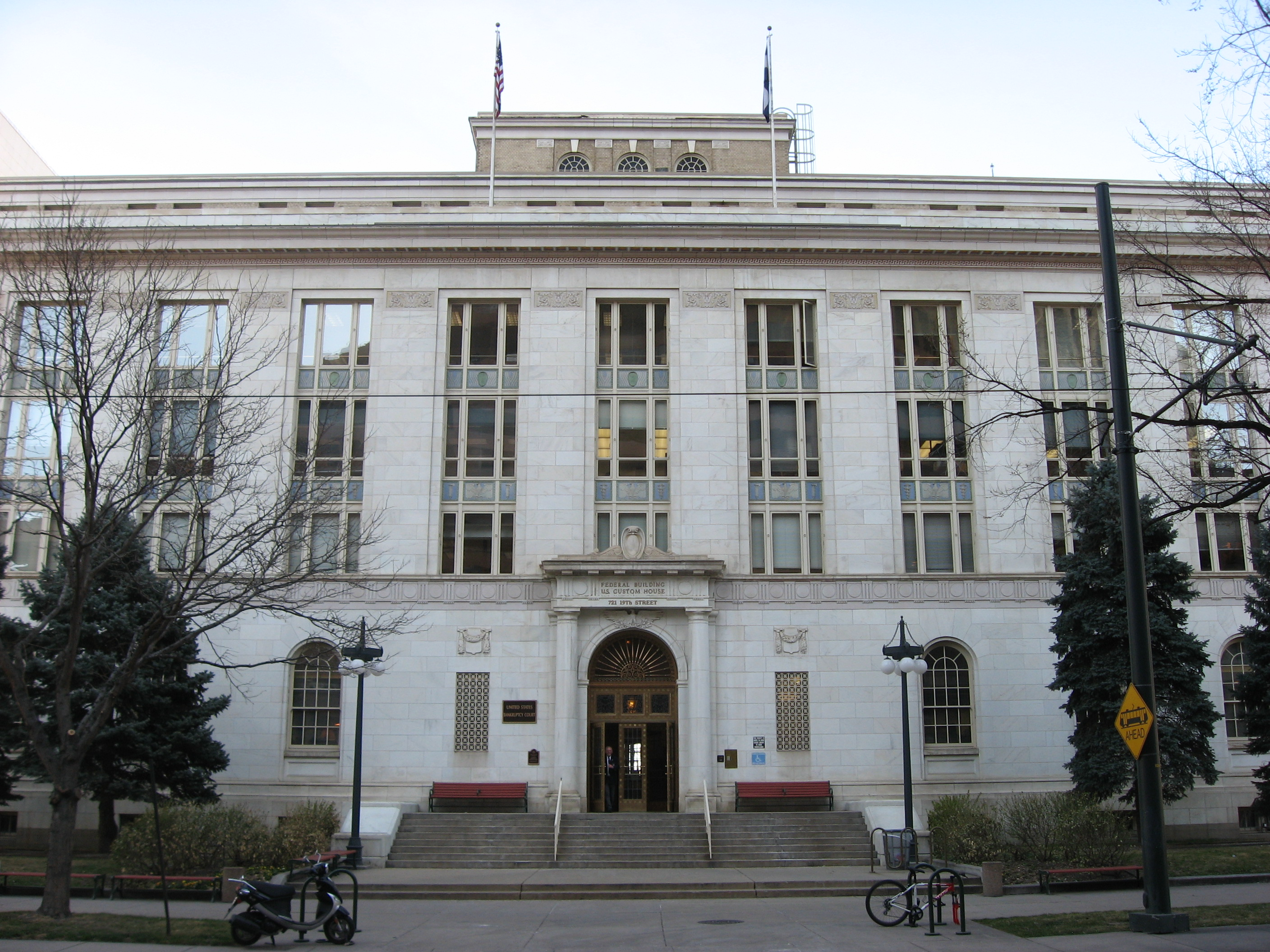
Adolf, Gartrell and Johnson were linked to vandalism shootings, one of which targeted the U.S. Custom House in Denver.

After their arrest, law enforcement officials investigated whether Adolf, Gartrell and Johnson were linked to vandalism shootings that targeted at least two federal buildings in Denver two weeks prior to their arrest. Windows were shot at the U.S. Custom House and the U.S. Military Entrance Processing Station in Denver's downtown Federal District. Authorities were also studying whether a bullet recovered from a Hertz rental car shot on August 15 could have matched the guns seized from the men.

Adolf, a Greeley, Colorado resident, was the only one of the three alleged plotters with any prior history of violence. Adolf was arrested on May 14, 1997, for his involvement in a theft of $350,000-worth of construction equipment, materials and vehicles in Greeley. He served prison time starting in 1997 on drug-related charges, and faced two third-degree assault charges in 2001. At the time of his arrest for the alleged assassination plot, eight outstanding warrants had been issued for him in response various crimes committed around Colorado, including one for skipping out on a $1 million bond. He was on the most-wanted list of the Weld County, Colorado sheriff's department for burglary, larceny, aggravated motor vehicle theft and other prior charges. Adolf possessed a handcuff key on one hand and a swastika ring on the other when he was arrested for the alleged assassination plot. His criminal history also included forgery, drug and weapon charges. Vicki Harbert, an investigator with the Weld County Sheriff's Department, had been pursuing Adolf since 2006 and feared he would eventually kill a police officer. Harbert said of Adolf after his 2008 arrest, "I've been a cop for 18 years and he was not your typical bad guy."

Tharin Gartrell is a professional club-music disc jockey, originally from Lincoln County, Nevada. He lived in Pioche, Nevada until the 1990s, when he moved to another rural Nevada town with his father, Carl "Flash" Gartrell, a journeyman ranch hand and heavy equipment operator. Carl Gartrell has a history of multiple drug- and alcohol-related arrests and, in August 2008, a warrant was issued for his arrest in Lincoln County. Tharin Gartrell, who had no known address at the time of his arrest, was run over by a truck as a child and, according to Lincoln County, Nevada Sheriff Kerry Lee, "It was absolutely amazing that he wasn't hurt badly." Gartrell experienced significant disciplinary action problems in high school and was told he would have to enroll in an alternative school, but never did. Friends said Gartrell had been on probation for drugs and had not committed any crimes for several years, but fell off the wagon and started spending time with Adolf in mid-August 2008. Like Adolf, Gartrell and Johnson had a criminal history involving burglary, forgery, drug and weapon charges. Tharin is registered with the Republican Party in Colorado.

== Comparison to other cases ==
The failure to prosecute the trio with federal charges caused some speculation about a government cover-up, particularly revolving around Troy Eid, who was appointed U.S. Attorney by President George W. Bush, and has been accused of showing political biases. Some questioned why Eid did not pursue federal charges against Gartrell, Adolf and Johnson, but filed similar charges against Marc Harold Ramsey, who allegedly sent a threatening letter to 2008 Republican presidential nominee Senator John McCain from behind bars in the Arapahoe County Jail. Ramsey, who faced five years in federal prison and $250,000 in fines if convicted, sent McCain a package with a harmless white powdery substance and a letter that read, "Senator McCain, If you are reading this then you are already DEAD! Unless of course you can't or don't breathe." Eid said the Ramsey case was "absolutely distinguishable" from that of Gartrell, Adolf and Johnson because there was no evidence of actual planning on the part of the trio.

In North Carolina, Jerry Blanchard was indicted for threatening to kill Obama during a July 15, 2008 breakfast at a Waffle House. He allegedly called Obama the "Antichrist" at the breakfast, and made similar threats against Obama later at a hotel. Blanchard was placed in custody despite the fact that no evidence surfaced that he planned to go through with an assassination attempt. Later that same month in Florida, Raymond H. Geisel was charged with making threatening statements against Obama during a bail-bonds training class on July 31. Geisel also threatened to put a bullet in the head of then-President Bush, although Geisel later claimed he was joking. He was found to be in possession of ammunition, body armor, a combat-style hatchet, tear gas, a loaded 9 mm handgun and four loaded magazines. Geisel said he collected firearms, and was only using the gun for his bail-bonds course. Geisel remained in custody for a month.

Eid said the Blanchard and Geisel situations were different from those of Gartrell, Adolf and Johnson because credible witnesses heard specific threats being made in both cases. Eid said Gartrell never made any threatening statements about killing Obama, and Johnson could not be considered a credible witness because he was under the influence of drugs when he made accusations against Gartrell and Adolf. Blanchard's attorney, Lawrence Hewitt, said he planned to research the Colorado cases to see whether it would have any bearing on his client's case. In a letter responding to criticism about not pursuing federal charges against Gartrell, Adolf and Johnson, Eid wrote, “It would have been disgraceful for me or any other prosecutor to charge someone for a crime he didn’t commit. ... There was no probable cause to support such a charge. To the extent you challenge my motives or those of the many investigating agents and career prosecutors who all reached this conclusion in this matter, you’re mistaken.”

== Media coverage ==
The story was reported by The New York Times and The Washington Post on August 27, 2008, as well as CNN's website. The alleged plot was originally listed as the 15th story on the CNN website and was not posted on the MSNBC site at all. The story was also unreported by ABC World News, NBC Nightly News, CBS Evening News and PBS NewsHour.

Troy Eid wrote an opinion piece saying the story was blown out of proportion by the blogosphere, and that legitimate newspapers reported on rumors and allegations in response to the blogs. Eid said he was "hounded" by countless bloggers about the story and accused of "racism and worse" for not charging the trio with threatening a presidential candidate. He said the situation was characteristic of the way the mainstream media was changing in response to the Information Age."

== Criminal charges ==
Shawn Adolf was retained in prison on a $1 million bond for several outstanding warrants involving drug charges. He was initially charged with possession of a firearm by a prohibited person, possession of body armor by a violent felon and possession of methamphetamine with intent to distribute. On November 6, 2009, Adolf pleaded guilty to the firearm possession charge, and the other two charges were dropped. On February 5, 2010, Adolf was sentenced to 30 months in federal prison over the weapons charges; that sentence is concurrent with Adolf's subsequent sentence on March 15 to 10 years in Colorado state prison on unrelated robbery charges.

Nathan Johnson was charged with simple possession of methamphetamine and possession of a firearm by a convicted felon, and received a $10,000 bond at a bond hearing. Some media outlets said the low bond amount indicated authorities did not believe he was capable of assassinating Obama. On December 16, 2008, Johnson pleaded guilty to one count of possession of a weapon by a prohibited person. Johnson was released from the Englewood Federal Correctional Institution on March 4, 2010.

Tharin Gartrell was sentenced to 15 days in prison and six months in a halfway house for a charge of possessing methamphetamine on January 29, 2009. During his sentencing, District Judge Robert E. Blackburn said, "Frankly, Mr. Gartrell, it's time you grew up." Phil Ewing, Gartrell's best friend, said at the hearing that the entire case was a misunderstanding and said, "Now people are going to see him as a racist, and that is not him." Gartrell was released from federal custody on June 12, 2009.

== See also ==
- Barack Obama assassination threats
- Barack Obama assassination plot in Tennessee
