= Cecil C. Humphreys School of Law =

Public law school in Memphis, Tennessee, US

University of Memphis Cecil C. Humphreys School of Law
- Motto: Imaginari. Cogitare. Facere.
- Parent school: University of Memphis
- Established: 1962
- School type: Public
- Parent endowment: $180 million
- Dean: Jim Strickland
- Location: Memphis, Tennessee, US; 35.14565°N 90.05469°W
- Enrollment: 314 (FT)
- Faculty: 26 (FT)/16 (PT Adjuncts)
- USNWR ranking: 140th (tie) (2024)
- Bar pass rate: 81.1% (July 2019)
- Website: www.memphis.edu/law
- ABA profile: University of Memphis, School of Law

The University of Memphis Cecil C. Humphreys School of Law is an American Bar Association accredited law school and is the only law school in Memphis, Tennessee. The school has been associated with the University of Memphis since the law school's formation in 1962. The school was named in honor of former University president Cecil C. Humphreys. It is also referred to as U of M Law, Memphis Law, or Memphis Law School.

According to Memphis Law's 2017 ABA-required disclosures, 69.69% of the Class of 2017 obtained full-time, long-term, bar passage-required employment after graduation, excluding solo practitioners.

== History ==
The law school was founded in 1962 as the Memphis State University College of Law. It gained ABA accreditation three years later in 1965. Former Memphis businessman Herbert Herff was a major benefactor to the University of Memphis. When he died in 1966, Herff left the bulk of his estate in trust with the State of Tennessee for the benefit of the University. Among his Foundation's funding is the Herbert Herff Presidential Law Scholarships and the Herbert Herff Chair of Excellence in Law.

Prior to the law school's founding, there were several other law schools in Memphis, including Memphis Law School, and Southern Law School (not to be confused with Southern University Law Center in Baton Rouge, LA), both of which subsequently merged with Memphis State University Law School. Memphis Law School existed as early as 1922 as the University of Memphis School of Law. Despite the names, neither Southern Law University nor the early University of Memphis School of Law had university connections, but rather offered part-time legal education programs, though both were approved by the State Board of Law Examiners.

The law school joined the Association of American Law Schools (AALS) in 2001. Reflecting the law school's increased profile, the Tennessee Supreme Court convened at the University of Memphis School of Law on November 4, 2010. In September 2012, the law school celebrated its semicentennial.

== Academics ==
The new Cecil C. Humphreys School of Law, a former United States federal courthouse, opened in 2010.

The law school has graduated more than 5,000 students since its inception, and it currently has approximately 314 students and twenty-six full-time professors. It is consistently named a “best value” in legal education by National Jurist Magazine. Additionally, it has a job placement rate such that 83% of graduates were employed, with 68% employed where bar admission was required, in long-term jobs within ten months of graduation (Class of 2016-2018). In the winter 2018 issue of preLaw, the University of Memphis Law School received an A− grade in "Best Value Law Schools" list. PreLaw has also recently included Memphis Law in their 2018 "Health Law Honor Roll."

U.S. News & World Report ranks Memphis Law as tied for No. 138 of American law schools in its 2020 rankings.

Memphis Law was recognized in 2014 by the National Jurist and preLaw magazine as having the "Best Law School Facilities in the Nation", and more recently, was named by the same publications as having the "Best Law School Building in the Nation."

For the class entering in Fall 2019, 62.05% of applicants were accepted for admission, 20.9% of those accepted actually matriculated, with entering students having a median LSAT score of 152 and a median undergraduate grade point average of 3.2.

Many students participate on moot court or mock trial teams or are involved with the school's law journal, the University of Memphis Law Review (founded in 1970). Additionally, the school's Moot Court/Mock Trial program has a history of fielding teams from the ABA National Appellate Advocacy Competition teams to specialized teams such as the Duberstein Bankruptcy Section team and the ABA Mediation Team.

The University of Memphis Law School was recognized in 2017 by Pre-law magazine as a "Most Diverse Law School" earning a B+ in diversity.

== New downtown campus ==
Main lobby of University of Memphis School of Law

Because of inadequate, old facilities, former Dean James Smoot positioned the law school for a move from its building on the University's main campus in East Memphis to a former customs house on the Mississippi River in downtown Memphis. The new law school campus is more than twice the size of the old campus. Until purchased by the law school, a portion of the building had been serving as a post office. Designed by Memphis firms Askew Nixon Ferguson Architects and Fleming Associates Architects, the new law school is located in the heart of Memphis' downtown. Former Tennessee governor, Phil Bredesen, has also lent his support and pledged $41 million in state funds for the move. Along with the purpose-specific interior redesign, the architect (Bill Nixon) oversaw structural renovations, including a $2 million seismic retrofit. The move was officially announced on January 12, 2006, and it was anticipated that the downtown facility would be ready for classes January 2010.

As of Fall 2010, the new downtown campus is fully operational, with a dedication ceremony held on January 16, 2010. The 169,000-square-foot (4-acre) building originally housed the late 19th century U.S. Customs House. Built in the early 1880s, the Italianate Revival-style building opened in 1885. Over the years, the building has served as Memphis' main customs house, federal court house, and most recently, as a U.S. post office. It was placed on the National Register of Historic Places in 1980.

Among features preserved in the restoration are the old federal courtroom, which now serves as one of the law school's moot courtrooms. During the restoration, a number of architectural details were rediscovered, including a decorative ceiling and roof monitor. The South Wing of the law school serves as the Plough Law Library; the library occupies all five levels of the South Wing, and includes West-facing glass walls overlooking the Mississippi River. The law library contains more than 250,000 volumes of books, journals and other legal materials. In addition, two of the building's 10 original security vaults serve as study spaces and small offices.

In the North Wing, administrative and faculty offices are on the second and third floors. The first floor houses a student lounge, study areas and a law student bookstore. The North Wing's lowest level contains the University of Memphis Legal Clinic, locker rooms and student organization offices. As a result of digital security measures, students, faculty and staff have 24/7 access to the law school, study rooms, and library.

Following the law school's move to the downtown location in 2010, it was ranked by the Princeton Review as a top 10 law school nationally for quality of life.

Memphis Law has been recognized by the National Jurist and preLaw magazine as having the "Best Law School Facilities in the Nation" in 2014, and more recently, was named by the same publications as having the "Best Law School Building in the Nation."

=== Library facilities ===
The new law school campus houses the Plough Foundation Law Library, which contains more than 270,000 volumes of books and microforms including statutes, court reports, digests, encyclopedias, treatises, loose-leaf services, periodicals, and government documents. The Law Library serves as a selective depository library for U.S. government publications since 1979. In addition to its own law library resources, students and staff also have access to the following libraries:

- McWherter Library—the main University of Memphis library and its departmental branches;
- Shelby County Law Library, located on the third floor of the Shelby County Courthouse, two blocks away from the law school.
- Memphis Public Library, Cossitt Branch Library, located adjacent to the law school. As of 2019 this branch is no longer in service.

== Post-graduation employment ==
According to Memphis Law's official 2013 ABA-required disclosures, 60.5% of the Class of 2013 obtained full-time, long-term, bar passage-required employment nine months after graduation, excluding solo-practitioners. The school ranked 75th out of the 201 ABA-approved law schools in terms of the percentage of 2013 graduates with non-school-funded, full-time, long-term, bar passage required jobs nine months after graduation.

Memphis Law's Law School Transparency under-employment score is 23.4%, indicating the percentage of the Class of 2013 unemployed, pursuing an additional degree, or working in a non-professional, short-term, or part-time job nine months after graduation. 83.1% of the Class of 2013 was employed in some capacity while 15.3% were unemployed nine months graduation.

== Costs ==
The total cost of attendance (indicating the cost of tuition & fees) at Memphis Law for the 2017-18 academic year is $19,197 for Tennessee residents and $26,402 for non-residents.

== Notable alumni ==
View of University of Memphis, School of Law facing north.

- John Ray Clemmons (born 1977), member of the Tennessee House of Representatives
- Bernice B. Donald (JD '79), Judge, United States Court of Appeals for the Sixth Circuit
- Holly M. Kirby (JD '82), Justice, Tennessee Supreme Court
- James Dale Todd (JD '72), U.S. federal judge
- Caroline C. Hunter, (JD '00), Chair, Federal Election Commission
- David Kustoff (JD '92), U.S. Representative for Tennessee's 8th Congressional District.
- Jim Kyle (JD '76), member of the Tennessee Senate
- S. Thomas Anderson (JD '80), U.S. federal judge
- Carol Chumney (JD '86), Tennessee politician
- Stu Grimson (JD '05), former professional hockey player
- John S. Wilder, Tennessee politician
- Avron Fogelman, Memphis real estate developer
- Steve Cohen (JD '73), U.S. Representative for Tennessee's 9th Congressional District.
- Tracy Hudson (JD '82), Judge, Virginia 31st Judicial Circuit
- William Sanderson (JD '71), film and television actor
- Jim Strickland (JD '89), Mayor of Memphis
- Don Tracy (JD '76), Chairman of Illinois Republican Party and Chairman of the Illinois Gaming Board

== Notable faculty ==
- Lee Harris, TN State Senator; Shelby County Mayor
- Andrew McClurg, author of 1L of a Ride
- Steven J. Mulroy, election and constitutional law scholar and politician.
- Robert Banks, co-author of the seminal treatise "Tennessee Civil Procedure."
- Daniel Kiel, director of The Memphis 13 documentary film

== In popular culture ==
- In the 1997 Hollywood film The Rainmaker, Rudy Baylor (played by Matt Damon) is a graduate of University of Memphis, School of Law.
- Reggie Love, the lawyer played by Susan Sarandon in The Client, mentioned she attended Memphis State, which is what the University was formerly known as.
