= S. Thomas Anderson =

American judge (born 1953)

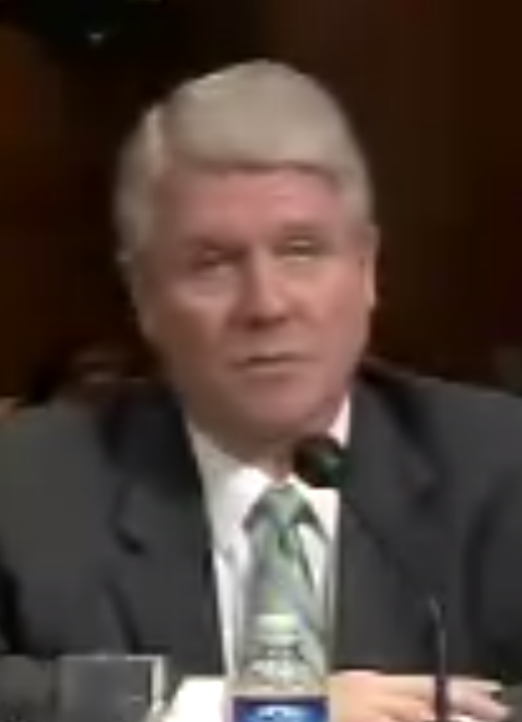

Chief Judge of the United States District Court for the Western District of Tennessee
- In office March 18, 2017 – January 20, 2023
- Preceded by: J. Daniel Breen
- Succeeded by: Sheryl H. Lipman

Judge of the United States District Court for the Western District of Tennessee
- Incumbent
- Assumed office May 21, 2008
- Appointed by: George W. Bush
- Preceded by: James Dale Todd

Magistrate Judge of the United States District Court for the Western District of Tennessee
- In office 2003 – May 21, 2008

Personal details
- Born: Stanley Thomas Anderson; 1953 (age 72–73) Lexington, Tennessee, U.S.
- Education: University of Tennessee (BS); University of Memphis (JD)

Stanley Thomas Anderson (born 1953) is United States district judge of the United States District Court for the Western District of Tennessee.

== Education and career ==
Anderson received a Bachelor of Science degree from the University of Tennessee in 1976 and a Juris Doctor from the University of Memphis School of Law in 1980. He was then in private practice in Tennessee until 1983, and again from 1987 to 2003, serving in the interim as an assistant commissioner of the Tennessee Department of Transportation from 1983 to 1985, and as a claims commissioner for the Tennessee Department of Treasury from 1985 to 1987.

=== Federal judicial service ===
In 2003, Anderson became a United States magistrate judge for the Western District of Tennessee. On September 6, 2007, he was nominated by President George W. Bush to a seat on the United States District Court for the Western District of Tennessee vacated by James Dale Todd. On April 10, 2008, Anderson was confirmed by the United States Senate by voice vote. and received his commission on May 21, 2008. He became Chief Judge on March 18, 2017 and served until January 20, 2023.

In May 2024, NPR revealed that Anderson had received free travel in December 2021 to the Breakers Colloquium, a privately funded legal seminar hosted at The Breakers resort in Palm Beach, Florida, but had failed to disclose this on his annual financial disclosure form for that year, in violation of federal ethics law. In response, a public affairs officer for the Administrative Office of the U.S. Courts told NPR that this omission was "due to an inadvertent oversight."

Legal offices
Preceded by James Dale Todd	Judge of the United States District Court for the Western District of Tennessee; 2008–present	Incumbent
Preceded by J. Daniel Breen	Chief Judge of the United States District Court for the Western District of Tennessee; 2017–2023	Succeeded by Sheryl H. Lipman
