= ANF Partners =

American architecture firm

ANF Architects, formerly Askew Nixon Ferguson Architects and originally Lee Askew and Associates, is a Memphis, Tennessee-based architectural firm established in 1975. It is led by Lee Askew III, a fellow (FAIA) at the American Institute of Architects. The firm's founders were Lee H. Askew, William B. Ferguson, William Nixon and Butch Wolfe.

In 1982 the firm became Askew Nixon Ferguson Wolfe. It became Askew Nixon Ferguson Architects in 1998. In 2008, the firm was run by eight partners, including Askew and Ferguson, and employed about thirty registered architects.

Its office building features a gallery which displays monthly art shows of local Memphis artists.

The work of ANF Architects includes museums, civic projects, high-design retail stores, and university projects.

== Notable projects ==
- University of Memphis, School of Law campus, re-purposing, retrofitting and interior design work

== Awards ==
- Design Award of Excellence, American Institute of Architects
- Award of Honor, American Institute of Architects
- Award of Excellence, American Institute of Architects
- Design Award, American Institute of Architects
- Design Award, Progressive Architecture Magazine
- Honorable Mention for Design, American Institute of Architects
- Educational Design Excellence, American School and University Magazine
