= University of Memphis Law Review =

- Discipline: American law
- Language: English

Publication details
- Former names: Memphis State University Law Commentary; Memphis State University Law Review
- History: 1968–present
- Frequency: Quarterly

Standard abbreviations
- Bluebook: U. Mem. L. Rev.
- ISO 4: Univ. Memphis Law Rev.

The University of Memphis Law Review is a student-run legal journal. It is the only academic journal of the Cecil C. Humphreys School of Law.

A predecessor of the review, entitled Memphis State University Law Commentary, began publishing in a topically arranged loose-leaf format in post binders in 1968. Its first editor-in-chief was Charles H. Johnston. It was not until 1970 that this publication was reformatted as a regular journal, entitled Memphis State University Law Review. In 1994, the review officially became known as the University of Memphis Law Review.

In 1993, the National Conference of Law Reviews, an organization of approximately 200 law reviews and journals, selected the University of Memphis Law Review as its first national headquarters, and the review held that position until 2003.

The review publishes four issues per year and is staffed by approximately sixty students. From the third-year members, an editorial board is selected, typically in early spring, which manages the review.
