= Indian Law and Order Commission =

The Indian Law and Order Commission (ILOC) is a federal commission established by the U.S. Congress in the Tribal Law and Order Act, (Pub.L. 111-211, H.R. 725, 124 Stat. 2258, enacted July 29, 2010), in Section 235 of the Act. Its chairman is Hon. Troy Eid.

The nine-member commission is charged with conducting a comprehensive study of law enforcement and criminal justice in tribal communities, and submitting a report to the President and Congress with its findings, conclusions and recommendations for, among other things, simplifying jurisdiction in Indian country, improving services and programs to prevent juvenile crime on Indian land, to rehabilitate Indian youth in custody, to reduce recidivism among Indian youth, as well as adjustments to the penal authority of tribal courts and alternatives to incarceration.

Appointments to the Commission were made in 2010 and allocated by the TLOA to the President, 3 members; the Majority Leader of the Senate, 2 members; the Senate Minority Leader, 1 member; the Speaker of the House of Representatives, 2 members; and the House Minority Leader, 1 member. The nine members appointed, alphabetically, with their appointing authority are:

- Hon. Troy Eid, former U.S. Attorney, Colorado (Sen. Reid);
- Affie Ellis, attorney, Wyoming (Sen. McConnell);
- Tom Gede, attorney, California (Rep. Boehner);
- Carole Golderg, Professor of Law and Vice Chancellor, UCLA (Pres. Obama);
- Hon. Stephanie Herseth Sandlin, former Member of Congress, South Dakota (Rep. Pelosi);
- Hon. Jefferson Keel, Lt. Governor, Chickasaw Nation, Oklahoma (Sen. Reid);
- Hon. Earl Pomeroy, former Member of Congress, North Dakota (Rep. Pelosi);
- Hon. Theresa Pouley, Chief Judge, Tulalip Tribal Court (Pres. Obama);
- Ted Quasula, former chief BIA Law Enforcement (Pres. Obama).

The Indian Law and Order Commission held its first in-person session on Wednesday, April 6, 2011

== See also ==
- 25 U.S.C. sec. 2812(e)(1)-(6).
- Pub.L. 111-211, H.R. 725, 124 Stat. 2258, § 235 (July 29, 2010).
