= Jackson Christian School =

Private Christian school in Jackson, Tennessee, United States

Coordinates: 35.668994°N 88.865753°W

Location
- 832 Country Club Lane; Jackson, Tennessee 38305; United States

Information
- School type: private Christian
- Religious affiliation: Churches of Christ
- Denomination: Christian
- Established: 1976
- NCES District ID: 01615341
- President: Billy Lones
- Elementary Principal: Lindsey Bradford
- Faculty: 140
- Grades: PK-12
- Enrollment: 1,020
- Student to teacher ratio: 15:1
- Hours in school day: 7.2
- Color
- Mascot: Eagles
- Accreditation: Southern Association of Colleges and Schools and the National Christian School Association
- Tuition: Varies by grade
- Website: jcseagles.org

Jackson Christian School is a private Christian school located in Jackson, Tennessee. Founded in 1976, Jackson Christian School provides education for students from Pre-K through high school.

== History ==
Jackson Christian School was founded in 1976 as a Christian school for students in grades 1 through 8, with an original enrollment of 58 students. Three years later, Jackson Christian School moved from its original location at the Central Church of Christ in Jackson, Tennessee to its current 28-acre facility.

== Campus ==
The school's current campus was built in 1979. Located on Country Club Lane near The Columns shopping district in Jackson, TN, the campus covers an area of 28 acres (110,000 m^{2}). It includes two gymnasiums, multiple computer labs, and a library.

=== Preschool location ===
Jackson Christian School has a preschool program in a separate location than the primary campus. Located at Campbell Street Church of Christ, the preschool program is for children ages 2–4.
