= National Conference of Law Reviews =

Voluntary organization of law reviews

The National Conference of Law Reviews (NCLR) is a voluntary organization of law reviews in the United States, Canada, and Puerto Rico. The NCLR is devoted to helping its members to better serve both the academic and legal communities. In pursuit of this goal, the NCLR holds an annual four-day conference each spring. The conference offers law review editors from member publications the opportunity to exchange ideas on issues common to student-edited law journals.

Texas Wesleyan University School of Law is the current national headquarters. The national headquarters is responsible for the annual membership drive, collecting membership dues, maintaining the NCLR website, coordinating the bidding for and hosting of the annual conference, and conducting the annual board meeting.
