= Michael Gerhardt =

American law professor

Michael J. Gerhardt
- Born: 1956 (age 69–70); Madison, Wisconsin, U.S.
- Education: Yale University (BA); London School of Economics (MSc); University of Chicago (JD)

Michael J. Gerhardt (born 1956) is the Samuel Ashe Distinguished Professor of Constitutional Law at the University of North Carolina School of Law in Chapel Hill. He is director of the Center on Law and Government at the University of North Carolina at Chapel Hill and considered an expert on constitutional law, separation of powers, and the legislative process. He is a Scholar in Residence at the National Constitution Center and visiting scholar at the University of Pennsylvania Law School.

On December 2, 2019, it was announced that Gerhardt would testify before the House Judiciary Committee regarding the constitutional grounds for presidential impeachment in the impeachment inquiry against Donald Trump.

== Early life and education ==
Gerhardt was born in 1956 in Madison, Wisconsin, and grew up in Mobile, Alabama, where he attended UMS-Wright and was ranked second in the state in junior tennis. He is a cum laude graduate of Yale University (B.A., 1978), attended graduate school at the London School of Economics (M.Sc., 1979), and graduated from the University of Chicago Law School (J.D., 1982). Gerhardt is Jewish.

Gerhardt served as a clerk for Chief Judge Robert McRae of the United States District Court for the Western District of Tennessee (1982–1983) and Judge Gilbert Merritt of the United States Court of Appeals for the Sixth Circuit from 1983 to 1984. After his clerkships, he served as deputy media director of Al Gore's Senate campaign. Gerhardt then worked for two law firms in Washington, D.C., and Atlanta.

== Career ==
Gerhardt joined the UNC law faculty in 2005. Prior to UNC, Gerhardt worked at Wake Forest School of Law and William & Mary Law School, served as dean of the Law School at Case Western Reserve, and had been a visiting professor at Duke and Cornell Law Schools. Gerhardt is the author of several books regarding constitutional law and history, including The Power of Precedent. His most recent book is The Forgotten Presidents: Their Untold Constitutional Legacy, published in April 2013 by Oxford University Press.

Gerhardt has assisted members of Congress and the White House on a range of various constitutional issues, beginning with drafting the judicial selection policy for the transition of Bill Clinton into office. Gerhardt then worked with the National Commission on Judicial Discipline and Removal. He has testified several times before the House Judiciary Committee, including as the only joint witness in the 1998 hearing on the history of U.S. impeachment, during the consideration of the impeachment of President Bill Clinton. Also, he was one of only two legal scholars to testify against the constitutionality of the Line Item Veto Act of 1996, which the Supreme Court struck down in Clinton v. City of New York.

In 2009, he testified as an expert before the select House committee considering whether to impeach Judge Thomas Porteous. He testified before the Senate regarding the constitutionality of filibustering.

Gerhardt has worked and testified in Senate confirmation proceedings for Supreme Court Justices, beginning in 1994 when he counseled the White House regarding Associate Justice Stephen Breyer's confirmation hearings. In 2005, he consulted with senators on the John Roberts nomination as Chief Justice of the United States. Gerhardt then served as a witness in the Senate Judiciary Committee's hearings on the nomination of Samuel Alito, to become an associate justice of the Supreme Court.

Along with Professor Laurence Tribe of Harvard Law School, he is the only legal scholar to have been invited to testify in both the 1998 impeachment proceedings against President Clinton and the confirmation hearings for Associate Justice Alito. He also acted as Special Counsel to Senator Patrick Leahy regarding the nominations of Elena Kagan and Sonia Sotomayor to the Supreme Court of the United States. In 2012, Gerhardt testified again before the House Committee on Oversight and Government Reform.

During the 2021 second impeachment trial of Donald Trump, Gerhardt served as special counsel to the presiding officer Patrick Leahy.

Gerhardt is interviewed frequently by news outlets as an expert on constitutional law and issues.

== Personal life ==
Gerhardt is married to Deborah Gerhardt, who teaches contracts, copyright, and trademark law at the University of North Carolina School of Law. They have three children together: Benjamin, Daniel, and Noah Gerhardt.

== Writings ==
- Gerhardt, Michael (2013). The Forgotten Presidents: Their Untold Constitutional Legacy. Oup USA. ISBN 978-0-19-996779-7.
- Gerhardt, Michael (2007). Constitutional Theory: Arguments and Perspective.Gerhardt, Michael (2011). The Power of Precedent.
- Gerhardt, Michael (2000). The Federal Impeachment Process: A Constitutional and Historical Analysis.
- Gerhardt, Michael (2003). The Federal Impeachment Process: A Constitutional and Historical Analysis (Constitutional Conflicts).
