= List of first minority male lawyers and judges in Tennessee =

This is a list of the first minority male lawyer(s) and judge(s) in Tennessee. It includes the year in which the men were admitted to practice law (in parentheses). Also included are other distinctions such as the first minority men in their state to graduate from law school or become a political figure.

== Firsts in Tennessee's history ==
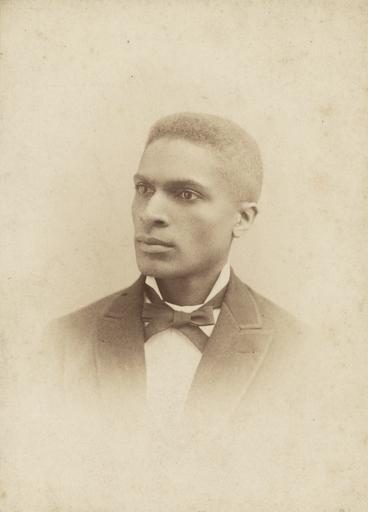
Fredrick McGhee: First African American male lawyer in Tennessee (1885)

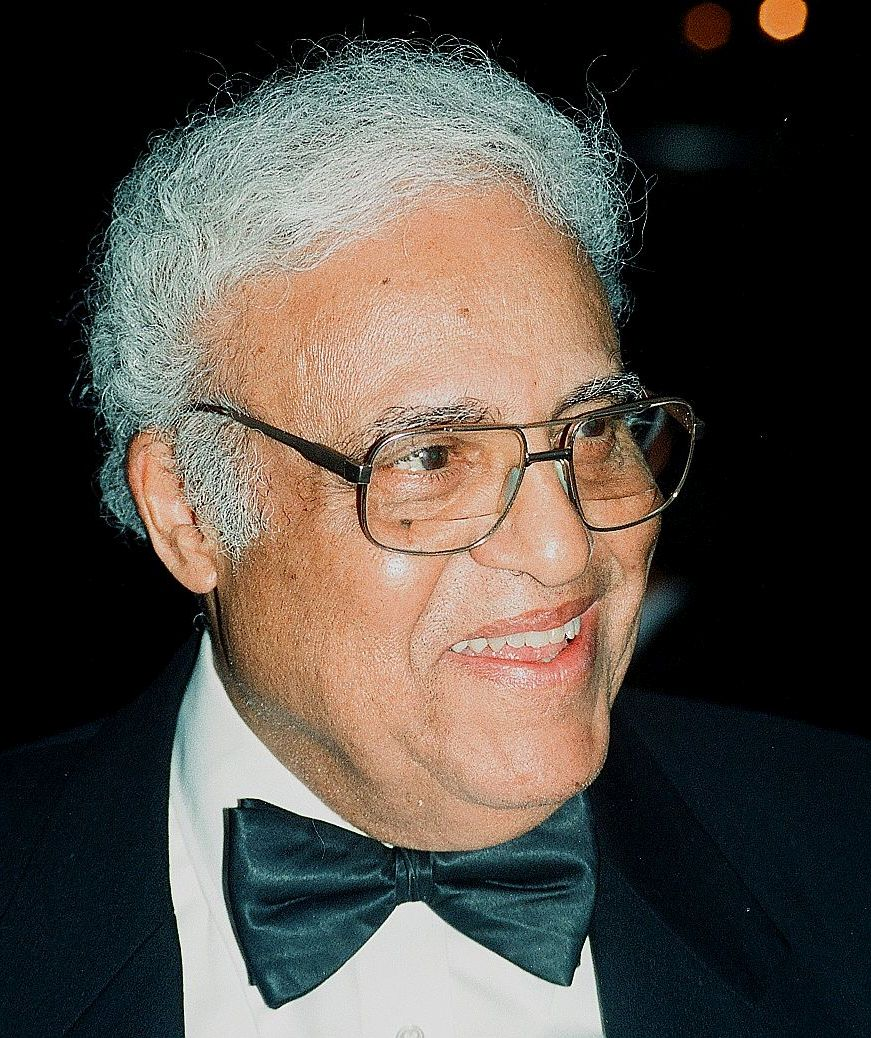
Benjamin Hooks: First African American male judge in Tennessee since Reconstruction Era (1965)

=== Lawyers ===
- First African American male: Horatio Nelson Rankin (1868)
- First African American male to argue a case before the Tennessee Supreme Court: William F. Yardley (1872) in 1883

=== State judges ===
- First Jewish American male (upon his brief appointment to the Supreme Court of Tennessee): Leopold Lehman in 1892
- First African American male (since Reconstruction): Benjamin Hooks (1948) in 1965
- First African American male (General Sessions Court): A. A. Birch Jr. (1956) in 1969
- First African American male (city court): S.A. Wilbun in 1973 (1973)
- First African American male (circuit court) S.A. Wilbun in 1978 (1978)
- First African American male (criminal court): A. A. Birch Jr. (1956) in 1978
- First African American male (Tennessee Supreme Court): George H. Brown in 1980
- First African American male (Chief Justice; Tennessee Supreme Court): A. A. Birch Jr. (1956) in 1994
- First African American male (Tennessee Court of Appeals): Richard Dinkins in 2008
- First Hispanic American male (trial court judge): Hector Sanchez in 2022

=== Federal judges ===
- First African American male (U.S. District Court for the Western District of Tennessee): Odell Horton (1956) in 1980
- First African American male (United States District Court for the Eastern District of Tennessee): Curtis L. Collier in 1995
- First African American male (U.S. District Court for the Middle District of Tennessee): William Joseph Haynes Jr. (1973) in 1999
- First Greek American male (Judge and Chief Judge): United States District Court for the Eastern District of Tennessee): Thomas A. Varlan in 2003 and 2012 respectively
- First African American male from Tennessee (United States Court of Appeals for the Sixth Circuit): Andre Mathis in 2022

=== Assistant United States Attorney ===
- First African American male: Odell Horton (1956)

=== Assistant District Attorney ===
- First African American males (since Reconstruction): Arthur T. Bennett and A. A. Birch Jr. (1956) respectively around 1965-1966

=== Public Defender ===
- First African American male: Benjamin Hooks (1948)

=== Faculty ===
- First African American male law professor: Joseph H. Dismukes in 1883

== Firsts in local history ==
- Nathan Pride: First African American male to serve as a Judge of the 26^{th} Judicial Circuit (2012). He was also the first African American male to serve as the Jackson City Attorney and the district’s public defender. [Chester, Henderson, and Madison Counties, Tennessee]
- Prince Albert Ewing: First African American male lawyer in Nashville, Davidson County, Tennessee
- A. A. Birch Jr. (1956): First African American male to serve as a prosecutor and judge in Davidson County, Tennessee
- Martesha L. Johnson (2018) First African American to serve as a Chief Public Defender for Metro Nashville, Davidson County and second woman.
- Rheubin Taylor: First African American male to serve as the County Attorney for Hamilton County, Tennessee (1994)
- Gerald Webb: First African American male judge in Hamilton County, Tennessee (2019)
- Wade Hinton: First African American male to serve as the City Attorney of Chattanooga, Hamilton County, Tennessee (2013)
- Robert L. Carter and H.T. Lockard: First African American male lawyers to argue a case before a Brownsville court (1961; Haywood County, Tennessee)
- William Francis Yardley (1872): First African American male lawyer in Knoxville, Knox County, Tennessee
- Charles E. Bush: First African American male judge in Montgomery County, Tennessee (1995)
- General Quarles Boyd: First African American male lawyer in Clarksville, Montgomery County, Tennessee
- John McClellan Sr.: First African American male to serve as the Justice of the Peace in Putnam County, Tennessee (1972)
- Thomas Frank Cassels: First African American male to serve as the Attorney General Pro Tem of Shelby County Criminal Court (c. 1880s)
- Josiah T. Settle (1875): First African American male to serve as a prosecutor in Shelby County, Tennessee
- Ural B. Adams: First African American male to serve as the Public Defender of Shelby County, Tennessee (1979)
- Floyd Peete: First African American male to serve as the Chancellor of Shelby County Chancery Court (1990)
- Tarik Sugarmon: First African American male to serve as a juvenile court judge in Shelby County, Tennessee (2022)
- S.A. Wilbun: First African American male to serve as the Assistant City Attorney in Memphis, Tennessee (1964) and City Court Judge (1973) in Memphis, Shelby County, Tennessee
- John George Morris: First Greek American lawyer in Memphis, Tennessee [Shelby County, Tennessee]
- Joe Brown: First African American male prosecutor in Memphis, Tennessee [Shelby County, Tennessee]

== See also ==
- List of first minority male lawyers and judges in the United States

== Other topics of interest ==
- List of first women lawyers and judges in the United States
- List of first women lawyers and judges in Tennessee
