= List of people executed in Tennessee (pre-1972) =

The following is a list of people executed in the U.S. state of Tennessee before 1972, when capital punishment was briefly abolished by the Supreme Court's ruling in Furman v. Georgia. For executions since 1976, when the court's ruling in Gregg v. Georgia restored capital punishment, see List of people executed in Tennessee.

== 1796–1909 ==
Slave executions

=== 1796–1809 ===
Name	Race	Age	Sex	Date of execution	County	Crime	Victim(s)	Governor
Robert Parker	White		M	April 28, 1797	Knox	Theft-Stealing	Thomas Humes, white	John Sevier
George	Native American		M	July 17, 1800	Knox (Federal)	Murder		John Sevier
Jack	Black		M	August 4, 1801 (Note: Executed by burning.)	Knox	Murder-Rape	Sarah Crawford, white	John Sevier
Aron Gist	White		M	January 15, 1802	Knox			Archibald Roane
Molly	Black		F	March 20, 1807	Williamson	Murder	Her child, black	John Sevier
Moses Penrice	Black		M	March 30, 1807	Montgomery	Murder	Samuel Minnott, white (owner)	John Sevier
Unknown	Black		F	1808	Jefferson	Murder	Female, white	John Sevier

=== 1810s ===
Name	Race	Age	Sex	Date of execution	County	Crime	Victim(s)	Governor
Unknown	Black		M	1810	Sumner	Rape		Willie Blount
Jacob Pickering	White		M	July 13, 1811	Davidson	Murder	Elijah Gardner, white	Willie Blount
Stewart Thornton	White		M	July 13, 1811	Davidson	Murder	Elijah Gardner, white	Willie Blount
James Brice	White		M	July 20, 1814	Blount	Slave stealing		Willie Blount
Unknown	Black		F	1819	Sumner	Murder	Female, white (owner)	Joseph McMinn

=== 1820s ===
Name	Race	Age	Sex	Date of execution	County	Crime	Victim(s)	Governor
John Lusk	White		M	June 26, 1820	Davidson	Rape		Joseph McMinn
Kinchen	Black		M	June 8, 1821	Montgomery	Murder	Elizabeth Crockett, white	Joseph McMinn
Mitchell Markum	White		M	June 29, 1821	Grainger	Murder		Joseph McMinn
Unknown	Black		M	May 1822	Henry	Murder	Male, black	William Carroll
Allen	Black		M	March 1, 1823	Williamson	Rape	Phebe Powell, white	William Carroll
Jim	Black		M	May 31, 1823	Williamson	Burglary	Mr. and Mrs. Robert Beard, white	William Carroll
Elias	Black		M	April 11, 1825	Montgomery	Rape		William Carroll
Duncan Bonds	White		M	October 13, 1826	Lincoln	Murder	Felix Grundy, white	William Carroll
James Bennett	White	30	M	April 2, 1827	Maury	Murder	Male, elderly, white	William Carroll
Thomas Jamison	White		M	May 4, 1827	Madison	Murder	Francis Sanders, white (father-in-law)	William Carroll
Randal	Black		M	May 4, 1827	Madison	Murder	Francis Sanders, white (father-in-law)	William Carroll
Mitchum	White		M	August 22, 1828	Hardeman	Murder	Female, white (wife)	Sam Houston
Henry Lunsford	White		M	September 26, 1828	Blount	Murder	Mr. Thompson, white	Sam Houston
Sam McClure	White		M	1829 (Note: Likely Spring 1829.)	Lincoln	Murder	Edward McBride, white	Sam Houston
Joshua Young	White	67	M	August 17, 1829	Knox	Murder	Female, 64, white (wife)	William Hall
James White	White	24	M	August 17, 1829	Knox	Murder	George W. Brown, white	William Hall

=== 1830s ===
Name	Race	Age	Sex	Date of execution	County	Crime	Victim(s)	Governor
Joe Bearden	White		M	1830	Humphreys	Murder		William Carroll
Charles	Black		M	1830	Williamson	Murder	John Turner, white (owner)	William Carroll
Unknown	White		M	1833	Davidson			William Carroll
Wiley	Black		M	December 28, 1833	Dickson	Murder	William C. Bird, white	William Carroll
Bennet Dula	White		M	September 14, 1835	White	Murder	William Patton, white	William Carroll
Clayton	Black		M	November 26, 1836	Wilson	Murder	Mr. Hunt and his daughter, white	Newton Cannon
Bob White	Black		M	December 4, 1836	Stewart	Murder		Newton Cannon
Mrs. Hughes	White		F	1837	Hardin	Murder	Male, white (husband)	Newton Cannon
Julius	Black		M	1837	Maury	Arson		Newton Cannon
Isaac Dale	White		M	1837	Giles	Murder		Newton Cannon
Milton Reilly	White		M	June 9, 1839	Madison	Murder (Note: Another man confessed to the crime many years later.)	William Willis, white	Newton Cannon
Charles Cox	Black		M	October 25, 1839	Blount	Murder	David Humes, white (wife's owner)	James K. Polk

=== 1840s ===
Name	Race	Age	Sex	Date of execution	County	Crime	Victim(s)	Governor
Two unknowns	Black		M	January 1840	Fentress			James K. Polk
Peter	Black		M	December 28, 1841	McMinn	Murder	Three females, white (Note: Wife and two daughters of John McMahan.)	James C. Jones
Jacob	Black		M	1842	Davidson	Murder	Robert Bradford, white (owner)	James C. Jones
Dick	Black		M	August 15, 1842	Williamson	Attempted rape	Elizabeth J. Hodges, white	James C. Jones
Willis Carroll	White		M	February 10, 1843	Davidson	Murder-Robbery	Rev. Isaac Lindsey, white	James C. Jones
Archibald Kirby	White		M	February 10, 1843	Davidson	Murder	Polly Hunter, white (Note: Previously acquitted of the murder of Peter Elrod.)	James C. Jones
Zebadiah Payne	White		M	February 10, 1843	Davidson	Murder-Robbery	William Coltart, white	James C. Jones
Henry	Black		M	April 4, 1843	Gibson	Murder	William C. Franklin, white	James C. Jones
Four unknowns	Black		M	December 22, 1843	Haywood	Murder	Thomas Branch, white	James C. Jones
Jim Payne	Black		M	1845 (Note: Likely Spring 1845.)	DeKalb	Murder	Isaac, black	James C. Jones
Bill Moore	Black		M	March 14, 1845	Lincoln	Attempted rape	Female, white	James C. Jones
Ned	Black		M	October 31, 1845	Robertson	Murder	David I. Walton, white (owner)	Aaron V. Brown
Skelt	Black		M	April 15, 1846	Henry	Murder	Mr. Dupree, white	Aaron V. Brown
Nelson	Black		M	June 8, 1846	Hardin	Murder	David Sellars, white	Aaron V. Brown
Bob Wood	Black		M	December 4, 1846	Stewart	Murder		Aaron V. Brown
Frank Oliver	Black		M	May 1847	Carroll	Murder	Mrs. Rumley, white	Aaron V. Brown
Gilbert	Black		M	1847	Henry	Murder	Armistead Forrest, elderly, white (owner)	Brown or Brown
Unknown	Black		M	March 3, 1848	Maury	Attempted murder	Mr. Haley, white	Neill S. Brown
John M. Riley	White		M	June 15, 1849	Madison	Murder	William Wells, white	Neill S. Brown

=== 1850s ===
Name	Race	Age	Sex	Date of execution	County	Crime	Victim(s)	Governor
Moses	Black		M	February 21, 1851	Davidson (Note: Change of venue from Sumner County.)	Murder	Male, white (owner)	William Trousdale
Henry	Black		M	February 21, 1851	Williamson	Murder	John G. Eelbeck and William P. Barham, white	William Trousdale
Alec	Black		M	April 17, 1852	Davidson	Murder	Two females, white	William B. Campbell
Jerry	Black		M	April 17, 1852	Davidson	Murder	Two females, white	William B. Campbell
Bob	Black		M	April 17, 1852	Davidson	Murder	Two females, white	William B. Campbell
Unknown	Black		M	April 1854	Franklin			Andrew Johnson
Martin	Black		M	1855	Giles	Murder		Andrew Johnson
Ben Harbert	Mixed (Note: Mulatto.)		M	March 7, 1856	Montgomery	Murder-Robbery	Hannah Frazier, black	Andrew Johnson
Four unknowns	Black		M	December 5, 1856	Stewart	Slave revolt	N/A	Andrew Johnson
John Lewis	White	21	M	December 16, 1859	Campbell	Murder	S. D. Queener (sheriff) and Travis Gibson, white	Isham G. Harris
Jesse Lewis	White	23	M	December 16, 1859	Campbell	Murder	S. D. Queener (sheriff) and Travis Gibson, white	Isham G. Harris

=== 1860s ===
Executions by firing squad

Name	Race	Age	Sex	Date of execution	County	Crime	Victim(s)	Governor
Two unknowns	Black		M	1861	Hawkins	Murder-Arson	Four people, white	Isham G. Harris
Alfred	Black		M	March 1, 1861	Lincoln	Murder	William Stevens, white (owner)	Isham G. Harris
Isaac	Black		M	May 31, 1861	Shelby	Murder	Gideon Bowen, white (overseer)	Isham G. Harris
Moses	Black		M	May 31, 1861	Shelby	Murder	Giacomo Passagno, white	Isham G. Harris
Levi Storer	White		M	June 28, 1861	Shelby	Murder	Aaron B. Stearns, white	Isham G. Harris
Charles Alexander Hahn	White		M	December 10, 1861	Knox (Military)	Sabotage	N/A	Isham G. Harris
Henry Harmon	White		M	December 17, 1861	Greene (Military)	Sabotage	N/A	Isham G. Harris
Jacob Harmon	White		M	December 17, 1861	Greene (Military)	Sabotage	N/A	Isham G. Harris
Michael Connel	White		M	March 5, 1862	? (Military)			Andrew Johnson
Harris	White		M	May 2, 1862	Hardeman (Military)	Desertion	N/A	Andrew Johnson
Julius Milika	White		M	May 15, 1863	Davidson (Military)	Desertion	N/A	Andrew Johnson
William A. Selkirk	White		M	June 4, 1863	Wilson	Murder	Adam Weaver, white	Andrew Johnson
William O. Williams	White		M	June 12, 1863	Williamson (Military)	Espionage	N/A	Andrew Johnson
Walter G. Peter	White		M	June 12, 1863	Williamson (Military)	Espionage	N/A	Andrew Johnson
David Blazer	White		M	June 23, 1863	Rutherford (Military)	Desertion	N/A	Andrew Johnson
Joseph Ford	White	20	M	July 24, 1863	Hamilton (Military)	Espionage	N/A	Andrew Johnson
John K. Ould	White	23	M	July 24, 1863	Hamilton (Military)	Espionage	N/A	Andrew Johnson
Hiram Reynolds	White		M	August 17, 1863	Davidson (Military)			Andrew Johnson
J. P. Pledger	White		M	September 4, 1863	Hamilton (Military)	Sedition	N/A	Andrew Johnson
Erastus C. Daily	White		M	November 13, 1863	Hamilton (Military)	Desertion	N/A	Andrew Johnson
Benjamin Valentine	White		M	November 13, 1863	Hamilton (Military)	Desertion	N/A	Andrew Johnson
Sam Davis	White	21	M	November 27, 1863	Giles (Military)	Espionage	N/A	Andrew Johnson
Edward S. Dodd	White	24	M	January 8, 1864	Knox (Military)	Espionage		Andrew Johnson
Four unknowns	White		M	March 1864	Madison (Military)			Andrew Johnson
John Myers	White		M	April 28, 1864	Giles (Military)	Murder	Capt. Henry W. Allen, white	Andrew Johnson
Martin Smith	White		M	April 29, 1864	Shelby (Military)	Sedition	N/A	Andrew Johnson
John Callaghan	White		M	June 10, 1864	Shelby (Military)	Rape		Andrew Johnson
Thomas Johnson	White		M	June 10, 1864	Shelby (Military)	Rape		Andrew Johnson
John Snover	White		M	June 10, 1864	Shelby (Military)	Rape		Andrew Johnson
William Lemmon	White		M	July 1, 1864	Davidson (Military)	Sabotage		Andrew Johnson
Cyrus Lee Cathie	White		M	July 1, 1864	Davidson (Military)	Sabotage		Andrew Johnson
Jesse B. Neeten	White		M	July 1, 1864	Davidson (Military)	Sabotage		Andrew Johnson
Thomas R. West	White		M	July 1, 1864	Davidson (Military)	Sabotage		Andrew Johnson
Benjamin F. West	White		M	July 1, 1864	Davidson (Military)	Sabotage		Andrew Johnson
James Jacob Sly	White		M	January 8, 1865	? (Military)	Guerilla activity		Andrew Johnson
Champ Ferguson	White	43	M	October 21, 1865	Davidson (Military)	Terrorism		Parson Brownlow
George Crab	White	17	M	January 26, 1866	Davidson	Murder-Robbery	William Hefferman, elderly, white	Parson Brownlow
James Lysaught	White	17	M	January 26, 1866	Davidson	Murder-Robbery	William Hefferman, elderly, white	Parson Brownlow
Thomas Ferry	White		M	January 26, 1866	Davidson	Murder-Robbery	William Hefferman, elderly, white	Parson Brownlow
James Knight	White	17	M	January 26, 1866	Davidson	Murder-Robbery	William Hefferman, elderly, white	Parson Brownlow
Columbus German	White		M	July 28, 1866	Overton	Murder	Lee Hays, white	Parson Brownlow
Jacob Huff	Black	32	M	December 27, 1867	Hamilton	Murder	Mr. Kilpatrick, white	Parson Brownlow
John Nance	White		M	December 27, 1867	Grainger	Murder	William McBee, white	Parson Brownlow
James Galvin	White	25	M	August 20, 1869	Shelby	Murder	Mr. Fenton, white (police officer) (Note: A child was also fatally wounded by a stray bullet.)	Dewitt Clinton Senter
Sam Moody	Black	20	M	August 20, 1869	Shelby	Murder-Burglary	Capt. Perry, white	Dewitt Clinton Senter

=== 1870s ===
Name	Race	Age	Sex	Date of execution	County	Crime	Victim(s)	Governor
Andrew Williams	White	21	M	December 16, 1870	Hamilton	Murder	Adolph Deutsch, white	Dewitt Clinton Senter
Edmund Lee	Black	22	M	February 8, 1872	Haywood	Murder	Elias King, 23, white	John C. Brown
Calvin Logston	White		M	April 5, 1872	Fentress	Murder	Three people, white (Note: Two women and a child.)	John C. Brown
John Presswood Jr.	White	18	M	May 24, 1872	DeKalb	Murder-Rape	Rachel Fowler Certain Billings, 39, white	John C. Brown
Prague Bryant	White		M	April 10, 1874	Giles	Murder	Alexander Steel, white	John C. Brown
Bill Kelly	Black	38	M	May 9, 1874	Davidson	Rape	Ms. Moore, white	John C. Brown
Robert Bascom	Black		M	September 26, 1874	Hardeman	Murder	John Marlow, white	John C. Brown
Shade Woods Westmoreland	White		M	November 20, 1874	Hamilton	Murder	William Emberlin, white	John C. Brown
Ananias Honeycutt	White	25	M	August 12, 1875	Claiborne	Murder-Robbery	Thomas Ausnus, white	James D. Porter
John Webb	White		M	August 13, 1875	Knox	Murder	Mr. and Mrs. Richard Reynolds, white	James D. Porter
Milton McLean	White		M	January 7, 1876	Madison	Murder	Thaddeus Pope, white	James D. Porter
Frank Scott	Black		M	January 7, 1876	Shelby	Murder	Ransom Phipps, black	James D. Porter
Bill Williams	Black	40	M	January 7, 1876	Shelby	Murder	Joe Fields, white	James D. Porter
Bob Beatty	Black		M	March 1876	Maury	Murder	Female, black (wife)	James D. Porter
Burr Spinks	Black		M	May 27, 1876	Wilson	Murder	Robert Hamilton, white	James D. Porter
Bill Mockbee	Black		M	May 25, 1877	Stewart	Murder-Robbery	Wylie McClish, white	James D. Porter
Millard Wilson	Black		M	July 13, 1877	Madison	Murder	Capt. Newton C. Perkins, white	James D. Porter
Jack Hunt	White	23	M	December 18, 1877	Monroe	Murder	Female, 18, white (wife)	James D. Porter
Jacob Harris	White		M	December 29, 1877	Anderson	Murder	Isaac White, white	James D. Porter
Brown Cable	Black		M	March 14, 1878	Franklin	Murder	Felix Gardner, black	James D. Porter
Joseph Brassell	White	23	M	March 27, 1878	Putnam	Murder	Russell and John Allison, white (Note: Serial killers, it is believed that Joseph murdered at least nine men and George at least three.)	James D. Porter
George Brassell	White	20	M	March 27, 1878	Putnam	Murder	Russell and John Allison, white	James D. Porter
George Howell	Black	17	M	September 5, 1878	Greene	Murder	Joseph Martin, white	James D. Porter
Stephen Griffey	White		M	November 22, 1878	Cocke	Rape	Eva Clark, 10, white	James D. Porter
Knox Martin	Black		M	March 28, 1879	Davidson	Murder	Mr. and Mrs. John Whittemeyer, white	Albert S. Marks
Anthony Blair	Black		M	September 26, 1879	Hamblen	Murder	Maggie Walker, 16, black (stepdaughter)	Albert S. Marks

=== 1880s ===
Name	Race	Age	Sex	Date of execution	County	Crime	Victim(s)	Governor
John Hall	Black		M	February 20, 1880	Rutherford	Murder	Major S. H. Pugh, white	Albert S. Marks
Burrill Smith	Black		M	February 20, 1880	Rutherford	Murder	Major S. H. Pugh, white	Albert S. Marks
Dan Potter	White		M	November 12, 1880	Cocke	Murder	Willis McMahan, white	Albert S. Marks
Ed Long	Black		M	December 18, 1880	Madison	Murder	Tito Rogers, black	Albert S. Marks
John Williams	Black		M	April 8, 1881	Humphreys	Murder	Female, black (wife)	Alvin Hawkins
Andrew Sanders	Black		M	August 26, 1881	Tipton	Murder	Mr. Miller, white	Alvin Hawkins
Henry Lawson	Black		M	September 2, 1881	Hamilton	Rape (Note: Evidence exonerating Lawson was later found.)	Nancy Donaldson, white	Alvin Hawkins
Joseph Harris	White		M	November 25, 1881	Hawkins	Murder-Robbery	Charles Brown and Mr. Heck, white	Alvin Hawkins
W. W. Rea	White		M	May 12, 1882	Giles	Murder	James T. Goodwin, white	Alvin Hawkins
Sandy Matthews	Black		M	June 2, 1882	Shelby	Murder	Jesse Polk, black	Alvin Hawkins
Samuel Hodges	Black		M	November 10, 1882	Knox	Murder	Jim McFarland, white	Alvin Hawkins
Milton Hodges	Black		M	November 10, 1882	Knox	Murder	Jim McFarland, white	Alvin Hawkins
Robert Wilson	Black	20	M	July 20, 1883	Shelby	Murder	Frank B. Russell, white	William B. Bate
Andy Taylor	White		M	November 23, 1883	Loudon	Murder	William T. Cate and J. J. Conway, white (Hamilton County sheriff and deputy)	William B. Bate
Shin Forrest	White		M	July 11, 1884	Henry	Murder	David Cruise and Jane Forrest, white (grandfather and mother)	William B. Bate
Charley Phillips	Black		M	July 31, 1884	Carroll	Murder	Frank Prince, black	William B. Bate
Ike Fain	Black		M	October 31, 1884	Roane	Murder	Frank Curran, white	William B. Bate
Joe Clark	Black		M	June 5, 1885	Hardeman	Murder	Peter Woodin, black	William B. Bate
Bill Morrow	White	35	M	June 20, 1885	Montgomery	Murder	Dick Overton, black (Note: Previously murdered another black man, Jim Brown, and was given a life sentence for the crime. Morrow accused Brown and Overton of attempting to rape his sister and daughter respectively.)	William B. Bate
John McKeever	Black		M	June 26, 1885	Shelby	Murder	William J. Traynor, white	William B. Bate
James Baxter	Black		M	June 4, 1886	Wilson	Murder-Robbery	Mrs. Lane, elderly, white	William B. Bate
Ben Brown	Black		M	April 15, 1887	Davidson	Murder	Frank Arnold, elderly, black	Robert Love Taylor
Napoleon Lester	White	60	M	April 20, 1888	Wilson	Murder	Lt. J. T. Lane, white	Robert Love Taylor
Hicks Carmichael	Black	23	M	July 20, 1888	Knox	Murder	Mr. Shipe, white (sheriff)	Robert Love Taylor
Jim Turney	Black		M	March 27, 1889	Wilson	Murder-Robbery	Male, black	Robert Love Taylor
Mark Francis	Black		M	March 27, 1889	Wilson	Murder-Robbery	Male, black	Robert Love Taylor
John Hanner	Black		M	July 1, 1889	Henry	Murder	Joseph Ellis, black	Robert Love Taylor
Thomas Jefferson	Black		M	July 13, 1889	Shelby	Murder	William Ragland, black	Robert Love Taylor
Charles Wirt	Black		M	July 13, 1889	Fayette	Murder	Evaline Hester, black	Robert Love Taylor
Thomas Condor	White	45	M	July 16, 1889	Obion	Murder	Jack Riley, white	Robert Love Taylor

=== 1890s ===
Name	Race	Age	Sex	Date of execution	County	Crime	Victim(s)	Governor
Parker Harris	Mixed (Note: Mulatto.)	31	M	June 24, 1890	Shelby	Murder	Letha Harris, black (wife)	Robert Love Taylor
Ed Carr	Black	28	M	June 24, 1890	Shelby	Murder	Martha Carr, black (wife)	Robert Love Taylor
Hardy Ballard	Black	45	M	June 24, 1890	Shelby	Murder	G. E. Pinkston, white	Robert Love Taylor
Frank Brenish	White	36	M	June 24, 1890	Shelby	Murder	Female, white (wife)	Robert Love Taylor
Jack Maples	Black		M	November 21, 1890	Knox	Rape	Mrs. Rufe Lewis, white	Robert Love Taylor
Houston Kelly	Black		M	November 12, 1891	Hawkins	Murder	Dan Carmichael, white	John P. Buchanan
Lemuel Jones	Black		M	December 28, 1891				John P. Buchanan
Jesse Frierson	Black	26	M	January 2, 1892	Hamilton	Murder	David Crockett Musgrove, 55, white (Chattanooga police officer)	John P. Buchanan
Larkin Lancaster	Black		M	April 19, 1892	Davidson	Murder	Zack Dixon, white	John P. Buchanan
Joe Wallace	White		M	June 17, 1892	Marion	Murder-Robbery	Henry Cote, white	John P. Buchanan
George Stone	Black		M	July 6, 1892	Lincoln	Murder		John P. Buchanan
John Turner	Black		M	February 16, 1893	Marion	Murder	George Dawson, white	Peter Turney
Fred Worley	Black		M	February 16, 1893	Marion	Murder	George Dawson, white	Peter Turney
John Armstrong	Black		M	December 13, 1893	McMinn	Murder	French Sharp, black	Peter Turney
Allan Cousans	White		M	December 21, 1893	Knox	Murder	Female, white (wife) (Note: Serial killer, murdered five people in Mexico (four Mexicans and a black man) "in a row" over one of the Mexicans, the black man's wife.)	Peter Turney
Lafayette Richey	Black		M	May 9, 1894	Jackson	Murder	William Stephens, white	Peter Turney
Harry Bennett	Black		M	July 24, 1894	Shelby	Murder	Female, black (wife)	Peter Turney
General Kennedy	White		M	December 18, 1894	Marion	Murder-Robbery	J. S. Lowery, white	Peter Turney
John Kennedy	White		M	December 18, 1894	Marion	Murder-Robbery	J. S. Lowery, white	Peter Turney
Clarence Cox	White	16	M	December 22, 1894	Union	Murder-Robbery	Mr. and Mrs. Henry Snoderly, 90 and 76, white	Peter Turney
John Stanley	White		M	December 22, 1894	Union	Murder-Robbery	Mr. and Mrs. Henry Snoderly, 90 and 76, white	Peter Turney
George Mapp	Black	20	M	January 11, 1895	Hamilton	Murder-Robbery	Marion Ross, white	Peter Turney
Buddy Wooten	Black		M	January 11, 1895	Hamilton	Murder-Robbery	Marion Ross, white	Peter Turney
Matthew Galloway	Black		M	April 20, 1895	Maury	Murder	James Walters, black	Peter Turney
Robert Ford	Black		M	April 20, 1895	Davidson	Murder		Peter Turney
Mike King	White		M	May 17, 1895	Scott	Murder-Robbery	A. C. Buck, white	Peter Turney
Robert Greene	White		M	July 30, 1896	Madison	Murder	Miles P. Mitchell, white	Peter Turney
William Whitlock	Black		M	August 13, 1896	Fayette	Murder	Mr. Holliday, white (La Grange constable)	Peter Turney
Frank Johnson	Black		M	December 4, 1896	Maury	Murder-Robbery	Male, black	Peter Turney
Marion Hatfield	White		M	December 16, 1896	Hancock	Murder	Jonas Trail, white	Peter Turney
Henry DeBerry	Black		M	August 19, 1897	Shelby	Attempted rape	Leonora Eigemann, 7, white	Robert Love Taylor
Robert Sims	Black		M	November 17, 1897	Washington	Murder	Walter Galloway, white	Robert Love Taylor
William Mays	White		M	November 17, 1897	Sullivan	Murder	C. D. Massengild, white	Robert Love Taylor
Mynatt Leach	White		M	December 8, 1897	Anderson	Murder	J. L. Heck, white	Robert Love Taylor
William Johnson	Black		M	December 17, 1897	Tipton	Murder	Walter Byrd, white	Robert Love Taylor
Daniel Harris			M	March 2, 1898	Davidson	Murder		Robert Love Taylor
George Pearson	Black		M	June 18, 1898	Madison	Murder	Sam Walker, black	Robert Love Taylor
Hiram Hall	White	21	M	April 13, 1899	Cumberland	Murder	Ida Belle Hall, 17, white (wife)	Benton McMillin
Catlett Tipton	White		M	July 5, 1899	Sevier	Murder	William and Laura Whaley, white	Benton McMillin
Pleas Wynn	White		M	July 5, 1899	Sevier	Murder	William and Laura Whaley, white	Benton McMillin

=== 1900s ===
Name	Race	Age	Sex	Date of execution	County	Crime	Victim(s)	Governor
Bill Brown	White		M	April 25, 1900	Warren	Murder	Mary Brown, white (wife)	Benton McMillin
Sonny Crain	Black	40	M	April 25, 1900	Warren	Murder	John Brown, white (Note: Brother of Bill Brown, also hung that same day.) (Note: Also previously murdered Will Shelling and was awaiting transportation to the state penitentiary at time of crime.)	Benton McMillin
John Watson	White	58	M	April 25, 1900	Warren	Murder	James Hillis, white	Benton McMillin
Henderson House	Black		M	September 19, 1900	Lauderdale	Murder	Duncan Goodrich, white	Benton McMillin
Dillard Warren	White		M	September 27, 1900	Cannon	Murder	E. L. Evans, white	Benton McMillin
Abe Petaway	Black		M	July 18, 1901	Davidson	Murder-Robbery	M. C. Wrenn, white	Benton McMillin
Babe Battise	Black		M	July 18, 1901	Davidson	Murder	Cain Miller, black	Benton McMillin
Decur Thompson	Black		M	July 18, 1901	Davidson	Murder	Cain Miller, black	Benton McMillin
Nathan Carruthers	Black		M	August 6, 1901	Shelby	Murder-Robbery	Charles Neebe, white	Benton McMillin
Armstrong Hensley	White		M	February 6, 1902	Unicoi	Murder	Female, 6, white (stepdaughter)	Benton McMillin
Dan Farley	Black		M	July 30, 1902	Shelby	Murder	Female, black (wife)	Benton McMillin
Henry Judge	White		M	May 5, 1904	Franklin	Murder	Mr. and Mrs. Simon Bucher, elderly, white	James B. Frazier
Joseph Delp	White		M	May 5, 1904	Franklin	Murder	Mr. and Mrs. Simon Bucher, elderly, white	James B. Frazier
John Evans	White		M	May 5, 1904	Franklin	Murder	Mr. and Mrs. Simon Bucher, elderly, white	James B. Frazier
Ben Springfield	Black		M	July 28, 1904	Madison	Murder	Female, black (wife)	James B. Frazier
James Scudder	Black	51	M	April 5, 1905	Davidson	Murder	James Alfred Scudder, 3, black (son)	John I. Cox
Andrew Hibbert	Black		M	April 5, 1905	Davidson	Murder	Mary Norvelle, black (mother-in-law)	John I. Cox
Toots Taylor	Black		M	July 18, 1905	Shelby	Murder	Sam Gaines, black	John I. Cox
A. M. Miles	Black		M	July 18, 1905	Shelby	Murder	Mattie Miles, black (estranged wife)	John I. Cox
Major Mills	Black		M	July 18, 1905	Shelby	Murder	Alex Gill, black (father-in-law)	John I. Cox
General Bone	Black		M	August 18, 1905	Shelby	Murder-Rape	Mattie Maben and her child, 3 months, black	John I. Cox
John Champion	Black		M	August 18, 1905	Shelby	Murder	Irene Jones, black (ex-girlfriend)	John I. Cox
James Norfleet	Black		M	August 18, 1905	Shelby	Murder	Lucy Norfleet, black (wife)	John I. Cox
John Hill	White		M	October 10, 1905	Tipton	Murder	Kate Hill, white (wife)	John I. Cox
Finley Preston	Black	27	M	November 7, 1905	Johnson	Murder	Lillie Shaw, black (love interest)	John I. Cox
Arthur Parson	Black		M	February 8, 1906	Wayne	Rape	Female, 13, white	John I. Cox
John Mitchell	Black		M	August 8, 1906	Dyer	Murder	Moses Weddle, white	John I. Cox
Andrew Upton	Black		M	December 20, 1906	Monroe	Murder-Burglary	Richard Johnson, elderly, white	John I. Cox
Hill Upton	Black		M	December 20, 1906	Monroe	Murder-Burglary	Richard Johnson, elderly, white	John I. Cox
John Thomas	Black		M	January 10, 1907	Knox	Murder	Ernest Perkins, white	John I. Cox
William Baird	White		M	May 24, 1907	Lincoln	Murder	Female, white (wife)	Malcom R. Patterson
Moses Walds	Black		M	October 31, 1907	Shelby	Murder	Frank A. Deering, white	Malcom R. Patterson
Beulah McGhee	Black		M	November 26, 1907	McMinn	Murder	Charlie Hicks, white	Malcom R. Patterson
Peter Turner	Black	37	M	January 11, 1908	Knox	Murder	Minnie Scott, black (girlfriend)	Malcom R. Patterson
John Carmack	Black	29	M	February 27, 1908	Knox	Murder-Robbery	Henry Ittner, 25, black	Malcom R. Patterson
Ed Turner	White	27	M	February 27, 1908	Hamilton	Murder	Lillie Turner, 17, white (wife)	Malcom R. Patterson
John McPherson	White	24	M	March 23, 1908	Knox	Murder	Grant Smith, white	Malcom R. Patterson
Marshall Lewis			M	July 12, 1908	Davidson	Murder		Malcom R. Patterson
Henry Johnson	Black		M	August 8, 1908	Shelby	Rape	Ida May Broadway, 3, white	Malcom R. Patterson
Dave Edwards	White		M	January 28, 1909	Hamilton	Murder	J. W. Davis, white	Malcom R. Patterson
Frank Gilbreath	Black		M	March 2, 1909	Lincoln	Murder	Ed Pigg, white	Malcom R. Patterson

== 1909–1960 ==
In 1909, all hangings in Tennessee were moved to the state penitentiary in Nashville, and on September 29, 1913, governor Ben W. Hooper officially signed into law the replacement of hanging with electrocution as passed by the state legislature during the final hours of an extra session that 26th.

Name	Race	Age	Sex	Date of execution	County	Crime	Victim(s)	Governor
Cecil Palmer	Black		M	October 1, 1909	Wilson	Rape	Mrs. W. W. Yates, white	Malcolm R. Patterson
William Mitchell	White	42	M	October 1, 1909	Rutherford	Murder-Robbery	Squire W. H. Hindman, white	Malcolm R. Patterson
Brice McDonald	Black		M	October 3, 1910	Madison	Murder	Female, black (brother's wife)	Malcolm R. Patterson
John Casson	Black		M	November 9, 1910	Shelby	Murder-Robbery	Martin Christenden, white	Malcolm R. Patterson
Moses Cook	White		M	November 9, 1910	Shelby	Murder	Female, white (wife)	Malcolm R. Patterson
Love Bond	Black		M	November 9, 1910	Hardeman	Murder	Female, black (wife)	Malcolm R. Patterson
F. T. Byrom	White	53	M	March 15, 1911	Wilson	Murder	Female, white (wife)	Ben W. Hooper
Robert Cook	Black		M	November 17, 1911	Hamilton	Murder-Robbery	William Houston, elderly, black	Ben W. Hooper
Tom Kinnon	Black		M	January 13, 1912	Gibson	Rape	Mrs. R. M. Watson, white	Ben W. Hooper
George Shelton	White	25	M	July 26, 1912	Decatur	Murder-Robbery	Three people, black (Note: Ben Pettigrew and his two children.)	Ben W. Hooper
John Bailey	White	25	M	July 26, 1912	Decatur	Murder-Robbery	Three people, black	Ben W. Hooper
George Rose	White	70	M	August 26, 1912	McMinn	Murder	J. M. Miller, white	Ben W. Hooper
Sid Dunlap	Black		M	September 4, 1912	Fayette	Murder-Robbery	Mary Ewell, white	Ben W. Hooper
Leo Temples	Black	17	M	December 19, 1912	Shelby	Rape	Clara Queen, 7, white	Ben W. Hooper
Pat Mulloy	Black	32	M	May 9, 1913	Davidson	Murder-Robbery	Herman Henning, elderly, white	Ben W. Hooper
Julius Morgan	Black	22	M	July 13, 1916	Dyer	Rape	Laura Sullivan, 20, white (Note: Serial rapist, previously served two years in Arkansas for assaulting another white woman in her home in 1913.)	Thomas Clarke Rye
Eddie Alsup	Black	17	M	July 8, 1918	Giles	Rape	Female, 16, white	Thomas Clarke Rye
J. D. Williams	Black		M	July 8, 1918	Giles	Rape	Female, 16, white	Thomas Clarke Rye
Frank Ewing	Black		M	May 21, 1919	Davidson	Rape	Anna Ferguson, white	Albert H. Roberts
Winifred Walker	Black		M	January 8, 1920	Jefferson	Rape	Frances Rankin, <12 white	Albert H. Roberts
Lorenzo Young	Black		M	September 3, 1920	Shelby	Murder	J. G. Brinkley, white (Memphis police sergeant)	Albert H. Roberts
Taylor Neal	Black	19	M	August 3, 1921	Hamilton	Murder-Rape-Robbery	Abe Baron and his girlfriend, white	Alfred A. Taylor
Cyrenas Jackson	Black	18	M	August 3, 1921	Hamilton	Murder-Rape-Robbery	Abe Baron and his girlfriend, white	Alfred A. Taylor
Hamp Gholson	Black		M	August 17, 1921	Shelby	Murder	Isaac Levy, white	Alfred A. Taylor
Chesley Graham	Black		M	August 17, 1921	Hardin	Murder-Robbery	Harry Allen, white	Alfred A. Taylor
Will Allen	Black		M	August 17, 1921	Hardin	Murder-Robbery	Harry Allen, white	Alfred A. Taylor
John Green	White		M	February 17, 1922	Washington	Murder	Robert Houston, white (Note: Previously served 12 years for the murder of Johnson City police officer Walter McPeak.)	Alfred A. Taylor
Asbury Fields	White	47	M	February 18, 1922	Bradley	Murder-Robbery	J. R. Pierce, white	Alfred A. Taylor
John B. McClure	White	26	M	March 1, 1922	Anderson	Murder-Robbery	Andrew Crumley, white	Alfred A. Taylor
Charles Petree	White	23	M	March 1, 1922	Anderson	Murder-Robbery	Andrew Crumley, white	Alfred A. Taylor
Otto Stephens	White	29	M	March 1, 1922	Anderson	Murder-Robbery	Andrew Crumley, white	Alfred A. Taylor
Tom Christmas	White	26	M	March 1, 1922	Anderson	Murder-Robbery	Andrew Crumley, white	Alfred A. Taylor
Maurice Mays	Mixed (Note: Mulatto.)	32	M	March 15, 1922	Knox	Murder-Rape	Bertie Lindsey, white	Alfred A. Taylor
Granville Bunch	White		M	April 11, 1922	Anderson	Murder	Female, white (wife)	Alfred A. Taylor
William Dwight	Black	18	M	July 25, 1922	Hamilton	Murder-Robbery	Frank Stoner, white	Alfred A. Taylor
Jim McElroy	White	50	M	August 15, 1922	Roane	Murder	Ed Ronnecker, white	Alfred A. Taylor
Austin Harris	Black		M	August 15, 1922	Madison	Murder	Male, black	Alfred A. Taylor
Ben Burchfield	White	44	M	January 14, 1925	Sullivan	Murder	Five people, white (Note: His wife Delia, their 12-year-old son Charles, Mr. and Mrs. J. W. Smith, and their 2-year-old daughter Ruby.)	Austin Peay
Robert Tate	White	26	M	November 5, 1925	Marion	Murder-Robbery	A. W. Condra, elderly, white	Austin Peay
Charles Barr	Black	26	M	August 20, 1926	Shelby	Murder-Rape-Robbery	Four people, white (Note: Duncan Waller, Ruth McElwaine Tucker, W. Obe Spencer, and Laura Wheaton Johnson. Tucker was raped and Johnson survived her injuries.)	Austin Peay
John Franklin Webb	Black		M	May 20, 1927	Shelby	Rape	Female, white	Austin Peay
John Henry Wallace	Black	37	M	May 23, 1927	Rutherford	Murder-Burglary	Everett Hedgecoth, 25, white	Austin Peay
Herman Coggin	White	29	M	November 10, 1927	Davidson	Rape	Female, 10, white	Henry Hollis Horton
Ben Fowler	White		M	January 25, 1928	Scott	Murder	J. W. West (police officer) and Dr. W. W. Foust, white (Note: Suspected serial killer, believed response for four or more previous murders.)	Henry Hollis Horton
Will Terrell	Black	22	M	June 19, 1928	Davidson	Rape	Emma Porter, 51, white	Henry Hollis Horton
Henry Brown	Black		M	August 22, 1928	Davidson	Rape-Burglary	Female, white	Henry Hollis Horton
John Jones	Black	20	M	February 14, 1930	Roane	Murder	Tom Sartain, white	Henry Hollis Horton
Carey Gunn	Black	21	M	March 14, 1930	Hardeman	Rape	Female, 15, white	Henry Hollis Horton
Theodore James Harris	Black	22	M	January 27, 1931	Knox	Murder-Burglary	Three people, white (Note: Dr. and Mrs. Barclay J. Jones and their 14-year-old nephew, George Lane.)	Henry Hollis Horton
John Thomas Shaw	Black	26	M	July 3, 1933	Davidson	Murder-Rape	Mary Lee Foster, 12, white	Hill McAlister
Oscar Bevins	Black	25	M	September 7, 1933	Hamilton	Rape	Female, white	Hill McAlister
Andrew Wilcoxen	Black	25	M	September 7, 1933	Hamilton	Rape	Female, white	Hill McAlister
Willie Jones	Black	24	M	October 30, 1933	Shelby	Murder	Granville Garner, white	Hill McAlister
James Allen	Black	21	M	January 5, 1934	Knox	Murder-Robbery	Roy Painter, 37, white	Hill McAlister
Joseph Emory	Black	39	M	February 5, 1934	Knox	Murder	Marian Arthur, black (ex-wife)	Hill McAlister
James Swann	Black	20	M	February 5, 1934	Jefferson	Murder-Rape	Sarah Abbie Rainwater, 53, white	Hill McAlister
Lewis Fain	Black	26	M	February 26, 1934	Knox	Murder-Rape-Burglary	Carrie Allen, 24, white	Hill McAlister
Percy Smith	Black	20	M	April 4, 1934	Shelby	Rape	Female, white	Hill McAlister
Jasper Graham	Black	29	M	April 4, 1934	Shelby	Rape	Female, white	Hill McAlister
Frank Mays	Black	30	M	April 4, 1934	Shelby	Rape	Female, white	Hill McAlister
John Deal	Black	31	M	September 15, 1934	Shelby	Murder-Burglary	Elizabeth Summerfield, white	Hill McAlister
James Pillow	Black	23	M	September 15, 1934	Shelby	Murder-Robbery	S. K. Lum, Asian	Hill McAlister
Walter Kennedy	White	22	M	January 21, 1936	Anderson	Murder-Robbery	John Lytle, 65, white	Hill McAlister
Bill Lee	White	24	M	January 21, 1936	Monroe	Murder-Burglary	Three people, elderly, white (Note: His grandparents Mr. and Mrs. Jasper Shaw and a visitor, Matt Hensley.)	Hill McAlister
Louis Willis	Black	27	M	January 28, 1936	Davidson	Murder	Ed Lowry, white (inmate) (Note: Trusty acting as a guard at the state penitentiary, murdering during an escape attempt.)	Hill McAlister
Ernest Womack	Black	18	M	April 10, 1936	Warren	Murder-Robbery	Paul Cunningham, white	Hill McAlister
Ernest K. Harris	Black	23	M	May 22, 1936	Bedford	Rape	Female, white	Hill McAlister
James Smith	Black	27	M	August 14, 1936	Lincoln	Murder-Robbery	Hugh Matlock, 56, white	Hill McAlister
Curley Ballard	Black	56	M	August 14, 1936	Sullivan	Murder	Willie Green, 17, black	Hill McAlister
James Clark	Black	23	M	August 14, 1936	Shelby	Murder-Burglary	Richard Sheehan, 27, white	Hill McAlister
Elmer Barrett	Black	22	M	November 18, 1936	Knox	Murder-Robbery	N. M. Hardwick, white	Hill McAlister
James Taylor	Black	25	M	March 15, 1937	Davidson	Rape-Robbery	Female, 24, white	Gordon Browning
Anderson Berry	Black		M	March 17, 1937	Lincoln	Murder-Robbery	Hugh Matlock, 65, white	Gordon Browning
Tom Franklin	Black	20	M	March 18, 1937	Davidson	Murder-Robbery	James B. Scott and Horace King, white	Gordon Browning
Gus McCoig	White	25	M	April 8, 1937	Union	Murder	L. B. Hutchison, white (sheriff)	Gordon Browning
Roy W. Eatmon	White	24	M	April 16, 1937	Shelby	Murder-Robbery	Griffith C. Thomasson, white	Gordon Browning
William Farmer	White	19	M	April 30, 1937	Davidson	Murder-Robbery	Jasper K. Milliken, 47, white	Gordon Browning
Howard Dunn	White	22	M	April 30, 1937	Davidson	Murder-Robbery	Jasper K. Milliken, 47, white	Gordon Browning
James Turner	Black	25	M	May 5, 1937	Shelby	Murder	Roy A. Scott, 32, white (patrolman)	Gordon Browning
Jimmie Lee Parrish	Black	35	M	August 9, 1937	Davidson	Rape	Female, 6, white	Gordon Browning
Fred Ritchie	White	32	M	August 10, 1937	Davidson	Murder	Elsie Ritchie, white (estranged wife)	Gordon Browning
Gus McKinney	Black	19	M	April 15, 1938	Shelby	Murder-Robbery	John Russell, black	Gordon Browning
Arthur Mosby	Black	30	M	July 25, 1938	Shelby	Rape	Female, white	Gordon Browning
Ernest Stanley	Black		M	January 10, 1939	Morgan	Murder	Glenn Johnson, white (guard)	Gordon Browning
White Miller Tollett	White	28	M	January 11, 1939	Carter	Murder	Three children, white (Note: Sonia June, Roma Jean, and Luena Gouge, ages 9, 6, and 7 respectively.)	Gordon Browning
Frank Murray	Black	19	M	March 28, 1939	Davidson	Murder-Robbery	Isaac Gordon, 34, white	Prentice Cooper
Herman Johnson	Black	22	M	March 28, 1939	Davidson	Murder-Robbery	Isaac Gordon, 34, white	Prentice Cooper
Hubert Harris	Black	22	M	April 4, 1939	Davidson	Murder-Burglary	Mike Finnegan, elderly, white	Prentice Cooper
Willie James Smith	Black		M	April 10, 1939	Shelby	Murder	Oliver James George, 22, white	Prentice Cooper
Joseph McKay	Black		M	April 10, 1939	Shelby	Murder	Oliver James George, 22, white	Prentice Cooper
James O. Martin	White	43	M	April 10, 1939	Shelby	Murder	Oliver James George, 22, white	Prentice Cooper
Willie Williams	Black	33	M	April 15, 1939	Davidson	Murder-Robbery	William James Sr., 67, white	Prentice Cooper
Harley Evans	White	26	M	August 28, 1939	Fentress	Murder	Ross Phillips, white (Note: Also under a life sentence for the murder of town marshal Oder Fowler on the same day.)	Prentice Cooper
Clyde Wills	White	29	M	January 10, 1940	Knox	Rape-Robbery	Female, white	Prentice Cooper
C. C. Mobley	Black	35	M	March 15, 1940	Shelby	Rape-Robbery	Female, white	Prentice Cooper
James Goodin	Black	21	M	September 4, 1940	Shelby	Murder-Robbery	Joseph Payne, 50, white	Prentice Cooper
William Nelson	White	44	M	September 4, 1940	Dyer	Murder	Frank Boyd, 54, white	Prentice Cooper
Van Gilmore	Black	31	M	April 18, 1941	Shelby	Rape-Robbery	Female, 25, white (Note: Serial rapist, previously attacked two black women and another white woman.)	Prentice Cooper
Walter Reed	Black	55	M	July 18, 1941	Hamilton	Murder-Rape	Jane Fowler Cathey, 37, white	Prentice Cooper
Willie Lee Porter	Black	21	M	July 24, 1941	Madison	Murder-Burglary	U. S. Grant Vernon, 57, white	Prentice Cooper
Carl Leonard Cole	Black	19	M	July 24, 1941	Madison	Murder-Burglary	U. S. Grant Vernon, 57, white	Prentice Cooper
Lawrence West	Black		M	July 30, 1941	Montgomery	Murder		Prentice Cooper
Roy Walden	White	36	M	February 13, 1942	Knox	Rape	Female, 8, white	Prentice Cooper
John Dockery	White	20	M	February 14, 1942	Knox	Rape-Robbery	Female, white	Prentice Cooper
Ernest Dixon	White	23	M	February 14, 1942	Knox	Rape-Robbery	Female, white	Prentice Cooper
Clarence May	White	33	M	March 20, 1942	Polk	Murder	Annie May, white (wife)	Prentice Cooper
John Henry Goode	Black		M	March 20, 1942	Shelby	Murder	Clyde Othel Miller, black	Prentice Cooper
Robert Cannon	Black	27	M	March 30, 1943	Shelby	Murder-Robbery	Roy E. Woods, 21, white	Prentice Cooper
William Hedden	White	44	M	March 30, 1943	Polk	Murder	Arline Dillard Glowan, white (Note: Also indicted for the murders of his sister-in-law Mrs. Jack Hedden and Glowan's 1-year-old son.)	Prentice Cooper
James F. Tucker	White	29	M	July 15, 1943	Davidson	Murder	Minnie Margaret Tucker, 22, white (wife)	Prentice Cooper
Marshall Spigner	White	40	M	July 15, 1943	Shelby	Murder-Rape-Robbery	Jewel Roberts, 27, white (love interest) (Note: Previously murdered a white girl who also resisted his advances and served 14 years in the state penitentiary.)	Prentice Cooper
Clyde Arwood	White	41	M	August 14, 1943	N/A (Federal)	Murder	William M. Pugh, white (federal investigator) (Note: Also previously murdered deputy sheriff James Wyatt Lunsford.)	Prentice Cooper
Robert Hall	Black	50	M	December 15, 1943	Hamilton	Murder	Arlie E. Carr, white (Chattanooga police officer)	Prentice Cooper
George Hambrick	Black		M	April 24, 1945	Davidson	Murder	E. P. McGrew, 72, white (guard)	Jim Nance McCord
Billy Dixon	Black		M	July 18, 1945	Montgomery	Rape		Jim Nance McCord
Thomas Walker	Black	33	M	March 1, 1946	Shelby	Murder-Robbery	Andrew Jackson Mitchison, 34, white	Jim Nance McCord
Johnnie Outlaw	Black	27	M	March 1, 1946	Shelby	Murder-Robbery	Andrew Jackson Mitchison, 34, white	Jim Nance McCord
George Douglas	Black	20	M	July 5, 1946	Shelby	Rape	Female, 17, white	Jim Nance McCord
John H. Luffman	White	46	M	August 30, 1946	Stewart	Murder-Rape	Grady and Ruthine Cherry, white (Note: Luffman subsequently served five years for raping a young girl and Hicks one year for attempted rape.)	Jim Nance McCord
Alvin Hicks	White	21	M	August 30, 1946	Stewart	Murder-Rape	Grady and Ruthine Cherry, white	Jim Nance McCord
Albert Duboise	White		M	April 11, 1947	Rutherford	Murder	Albert Willis, white	Jim Nance McCord
John Hodge Jr.	Black	28	M	June 19, 1947	Davidson	Rape	Female, white	Jim Nance McCord
Fred Jackson	Black	18	M	August 11, 1947	Shelby	Murder	Sammie M. Goss, 3, white (Note: Raped Mrs. Goss before attacking her two children.)	Jim Nance McCord
John Kelley	White	21	M	April 22, 1948	Hickman	Murder-Robbery	J. Edward Sprouse, 36, white	Jim Nance McCord
James Sandusky	White	20	M	April 22, 1948	Hickman	Murder-Robbery	J. Edward Sprouse, 36, white	Jim Nance McCord
Tommy Taylor	Black	33	M	August 31, 1948	Davidson	Rape	Two females, both 19, white	Jim Nance McCord
James Scribner	Black	25	M	August 31, 1948	Davidson	Rape	Two females, both 19, white	Jim Nance McCord
William J. C. Turner	Black	21	M	August 31, 1948	Davidson	Rape	Two females, both 19, white	Jim Nance McCord
Barney Thompson	Black	29	M	February 17, 1949	Bradley	Murder	Maggie Ashmore, black (girlfriend)	Gordon Browning
Bruce Edward Watson	Black	25	M	June 10, 1949	Shelby	Rape	Edith Comer, 50, white	Gordon Browning
Steve Paul Lacy	Black	28	M	November 15, 1949	Maury	Murder-Rape	Mrs. Otie C. Brown, 67, white	Gordon Browning
Clyde Steele	Black	21	M	January 24, 1950	Knox	Rape	Female, 58, white	Gordon Browning
Samuel L. Voss	Black	29	M	April 15, 1955	Davidson	Murder-Robbery	Louis Hutchison, white (Note: Also robbed and murdered James R. Cox a month later.)	Frank G. Clement
Charles Sullins	White	34	M	August 1, 1955	Wilson	Murder-Robbery	Ed Collier, white	Frank G. Clement
Harry Kirkendall	Black	33	M	August 1, 1955	Wilson	Murder-Robbery	Ed Collier, white	Frank G. Clement
Robert Crenshaw	Black	41	M	September 15, 1955	Davidson	Rape	Female, white	Frank G. Clement
Jimmy Allen	Black	36	M	March 15, 1957	Davidson	Murder	Janet Allen, 1, black (stepdaughter) (Note: Suspected serial killer, suspected of poisoning his first wife and their son Jimmy (9) and his stepson Reginald Allen (3) died under circumstances similar to Janet while the family was living in Miami.)	Frank G. Clement
Billy Thomas Gibbs	White	25	M	May 6, 1957	Coffee	Murder	Bratcher family, white	Frank G. Clement
Tom Rutledge	White	32	M	June 15, 1959	Warren	Murder-Rape	Greva Joyce Raper, 12, white (second cousin)	Buford Ellington
William Tines	Black	37	M	November 7, 1960	Roane	Rape	Bertha Riggs, white (Note: Serving a life sentence for murder at time of crime.)	Buford Ellington

== See also ==
- Capital punishment in Tennessee
- Crime in Tennessee
