= Edward L. Stanton III =

American lawyer

Edward Stanton
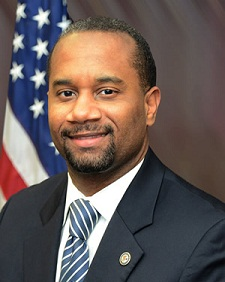

United States Attorney for the Western District of Tennessee
- In office August 16, 2010 – February 28, 2017
- President: Barack Obama; Donald Trump
- Preceded by: David Kustoff
- Succeeded by: D. Michael Dunavant

Personal details
- Born: Edward Lesley Stanton III; 1972 (age 53–54) Memphis, Tennessee, U.S.
- Education: University of Memphis

Edward Lesley Stanton III (born 1972) is a former United States attorney for the Western District of Tennessee and is a former nominee to be a United States district judge of the United States District Court for the Western District of Tennessee.

== Biography ==
Stanton was born in Memphis, Tennessee in 1972 and is a lifelong Memphian, graduating from Central High School in Memphis. Stanton received a Bachelor of Arts degree in political science in 1994 from the University of Memphis. He received a Juris Doctor in 1997 from the Cecil C. Humphreys School of Law at the University of Memphis. A member of Alpha Phi Alpha fraternity, Stanton was initiated into the University of Memphis chapter (Kappa Eta) in 1991. He began his career as an associate in the Law Offices of Charles E. Carpenter, P.C., from 1997 to 2000. He served as an assistant city attorney for the City of Memphis Law Division, from 2000 to 2001. From 2001 to 2002, he was an associate in the Memphis office of the law firm Armstrong Allen PLLC. From 2002 to 2010, he was senior counsel in the litigation department of FedEx. From 2010 to 2017, he served as United States attorney for the Western District of Tennessee.

=== Service as United States attorney ===
On April 14, 2010, President Barack Obama nominated Stanton to be United States attorney for the Western District of Tennessee, in lieu of David F. Kustoff, who had resigned. His nomination was reported by the Senate Judiciary Committee on June 24, 2010 and he was confirmed by voice vote on August 5, 2010. He received his commission and was sworn in on August 16, 2010. He resigned on February 28, 2017.

=== Expired nomination to district court ===
On May 21, 2015, President Barack Obama nominated Stanton to serve as a United States district judge of the United States District Court for the Western District of Tennessee, to the seat being vacated by Judge Samuel H. Mays Jr., who took senior status on July 1, 2015. He received a hearing before the Senate Judiciary Committee on September 30, 2015. On October 29, 2015 his nomination was reported out of committee by voice vote. His nomination expired on January 3, 2017, with the end of the 114th Congress.
