= Marion Speed Boyd =

American judge (1900–1988)

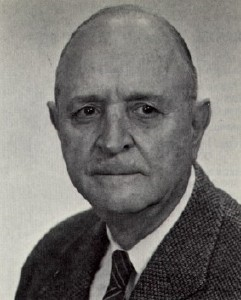

Senior Judge of the United States District Court for the Western District of Tennessee
- In office August 1, 1966 – January 9, 1988

Chief Judge of the United States District Court for the Western District of Tennessee
- In office 1961–1966
- Preceded by: Office established
- Succeeded by: Bailey Brown

Judge of the United States District Court for the Western District of Tennessee
- In office September 27, 1940 – August 1, 1966
- Appointed by: Franklin D. Roosevelt
- Preceded by: John Donelson Martin Sr.
- Succeeded by: Robert Malcolm McRae Jr.

Personal details
- Born: Marion Speed Boyd; September 12, 1900 Covington, Tennessee, U.S.
- Died: January 9, 1988 (aged 87)
- Education: University of Tennessee College of Law (LLB.)

Marion Speed Boyd (September 12, 1900 – January 9, 1988) was a United States district judge of the United States District Court for the Western District of Tennessee.

== Education and career ==
Born in Covington, Tennessee, Boyd received a Bachelor of Laws from the University of Tennessee College of Law in 1921 and entered private practice in Memphis, Tennessee. He was a member of the Tennessee House of Representatives from 1925 to 1927, and was then an assistant district attorney general of Shelby County, Tennessee until 1935. He served in the Tennessee Senate in 1935, and was then a Referee in Bankruptcy for the United States District Court for the Western District of Tennessee from 1935 to 1937. He was a Judge of the City Court of Memphis from 1937 to 1938, and district attorney general of Shelby County from 1938 to 1940.

== Federal judicial service ==
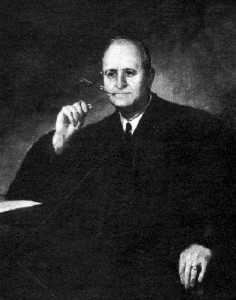
Judicial portrait of Boyd, 1964, by K. Doyle Boyd.

On September 13, 1940, Boyd was nominated by President Franklin D. Roosevelt to a seat on the United States District Court for the Western District of Tennessee vacated by Judge John Donelson Martin Sr. Boyd was confirmed by the United States Senate on September 18, 1940, and received his commission on September 27, 1940. He served as a member of the Judicial Conference of the United States from 1960 to 1963, and as Chief Judge from 1961 to 1966, assuming senior status on August 1, 1966, and continuing in that capacity until his death on January 9, 1988.

=== Notable cases ===
Boyd confirmed the death sentence of Clyde Arwood in January 1942, Tennessee's only federal death sentence.

== See also ==
- List of United States federal judges by longevity of service

== Sources ==
Legal offices
| Preceded by John Donelson Martin Sr. | Judge of the United States District Court for the Western District of Tennessee; 1940–1966 | Succeeded by Robert Malcolm McRae Jr. |
| Preceded by Office established | Chief Judge of the United States District Court for the Western District of Tennessee; 1961–1966 | Succeeded by Bailey Brown |
