= Bailey Brown =

American judge (1917-2004)

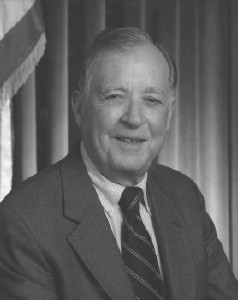

Senior Judge of the United States Court of Appeals for the Sixth Circuit
- In office June 16, 1982 – December 31, 1997

Judge of the United States Court of Appeals for the Sixth Circuit
- In office September 26, 1979 – June 16, 1982
- Appointed by: Jimmy Carter
- Preceded by: Harry Phillips
- Succeeded by: Harry W. Wellford

Chief Judge of the United States District Court for the Western District of Tennessee
- In office 1966–1979
- Preceded by: Marion Speed Boyd
- Succeeded by: Robert Malcolm McRae Jr.

Judge of the United States District Court for the Western District of Tennessee
- In office August 21, 1961 – September 26, 1979
- Appointed by: John F. Kennedy
- Preceded by: Seat established by 75 Stat. 80
- Succeeded by: Odell Horton

Personal details
- Born: Bailey Brown; June 16, 1917 Memphis, Tennessee, U.S.
- Died: October 6, 2004 (aged 87) Memphis, Tennessee, U.S.
- Education: University of Michigan (AB); Harvard Law School (LLB)

Bailey Brown (June 16, 1917 – October 6, 2004) was a United States circuit judge of the United States Court of Appeals for the Sixth Circuit and prior to that was a United States district judge of the United States District Court for the Western District of Tennessee.

== Education and career ==
Born in Memphis, Tennessee, Brown received an Artium Baccalaureus degree from the University of Michigan in 1939, and a Bachelor of Laws from Harvard Law School in 1942. He was a lieutenant in the United States Navy during World War II, from 1942 to 1946. He was in private practice in Memphis from 1946 to 1961.

== Federal judicial service ==
Brown was nominated by President John F. Kennedy on August 7, 1961, to the United States District Court for the Western District of Tennessee, to a new seat authorized by 75 Stat. 80. He was confirmed by the United States Senate on August 21, 1961, and received his commission on August 21, 1961. He served as Chief Judge from 1966 to 1979. His service terminated on September 26, 1979, due to elevation to the Sixth Circuit.

Brown was nominated by President Jimmy Carter on March 15, 1979, to a seat on the United States Court of Appeals for the Sixth Circuit vacated by Judge Harry Phillips. He was confirmed by the Senate on September 25, 1979, and received his commission on September 26, 1979. He assumed senior status on June 16, 1982. His service terminated on December 31, 1997, due to retirement.

== Death ==
Brown died on October 6, 2004, in Memphis.

== Sources ==
Legal offices
Preceded by Seat established by 75 Stat. 80	Judge of the United States District Court for the Western District of Tennessee; 1961–1979	Succeeded by Odell Horton
Preceded by Marion Speed Boyd	Chief Judge of the United States District Court for the Western District of Tennessee; 1966–1979	Succeeded by Robert Malcolm McRae Jr.
Preceded by Harry Phillips	Judge of the United States Court of Appeals for the Sixth Circuit; 1979–1982	Succeeded by Harry W. Wellford
