= Baker Donelson =

U.S. law firm

Baker, Donelson, Bearman, Caldwell & Berkowitz P.C.
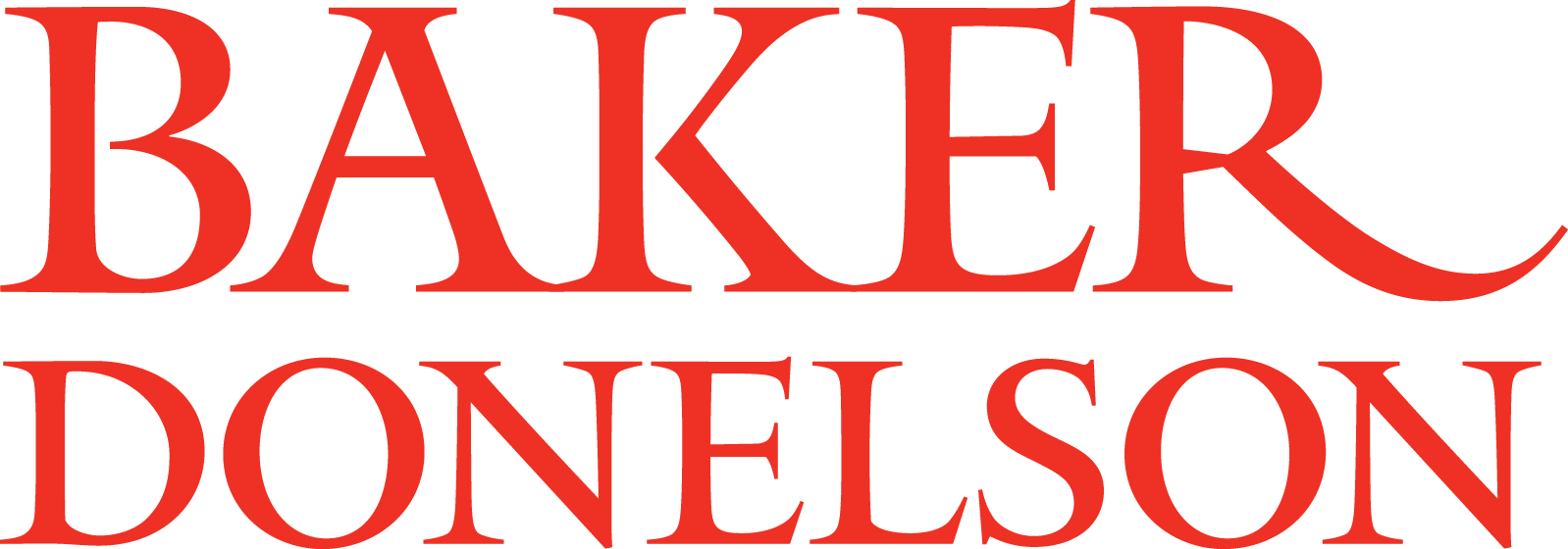
- Headquarters: Memphis, Tennessee Washington, D.C. Huntsville, Tennessee (formerly)
- No. of offices: 25 total
- No. of attorneys: 700+ (2025)
- Major practice areas: General practice
- Key people: Timothy Lupinacci, Chairman & CEO
- Date founded: 1888
- Founder: James F. Baker
- Company type: Professional corporation
- Website: bakerdonelson.com

Baker, Donelson, Bearman, Caldwell & Berkowitz P.C. is a large U.S. law firm and lobbying group with offices in the Southeastern United States and Washington, D.C. The firm was co-founded by James F. Baker, the father of Republican Representative Howard Baker Sr. and grandfather of Senate Majority Leader Howard Baker Jr. As of 2024, Baker Donelson is ranked the 79th largest U.S. law firm according to the National Law Journal's 2024 NLJ 500 ranking. The firm ranked 102nd on The American Lawyer's 2025 Am Law 200 ranking.

Fortune has selected Baker Donelson as one of the 100 Best Companies to Work For nine times, citing the firm's commitment to diversity, public service and pro bono work.

== History ==
Baker, Donelson, Bearman, Caldwell & Berkowitz traces its roots back to Baker, Worthington, Crossley, Stansberry & Wolff, founded circa 1888 in Huntsville, Tennessee by James F. Baker.

James F. Baker's son, Howard Baker Sr., who served as a U.S. Representative from Tennessee, was a lawyer at the firm, as was his son Howard Baker Jr., who was U.S. Senate majority leader and White House Chief of Staff. Howard Baker Jr. was the last lawyer from the original Huntsville office, which closed after his death in 2014.

The current firm, headquartered in Memphis, is the result of a series of mergers of many different predecessor firms spread throughout the Southern United States. This includes its merger with healthcare law-focused Maryland firm Ober|Kaler, which was announced in 2016.

== Practice areas ==
In addition to its broad-based litigation practice, the firm has practices in corporate law, mergers & acquisitions, labor and employment, real estate, bankruptcy, health law, intellectual property, international business law, and tax law. It is also known as a large lobbying firm.

== Notable lawyers and alumni ==
=== Members of the U.S. Congress ===
- Howard Baker Sr., former U.S Representative from Tennessee's 2nd district (1951-1964); son of firm co-founder James F. Baker.
- Howard Baker Jr., former U.S. Senator from Tennessee (1967-1985) and Senate Majority Leader, former U.S. Ambassador to Japan; grandson of James F. Baker, later Senior Counsel to the firm before his death in 2014.
- Barbara Comstock, former U.S. Representative from Virginia's 10th district (2015-2019)
- Nancy Johnson, former U.S Representative from Connecticut's 6th and later 5th districts (1983-2007)
- Tom Daschle, former U.S. Senator from South Dakota (1987-2005) and Senate Majority Leader
- Ellen Tauscher, former U.S Representative from California's 10th district (1997-2009); former Under Secretary of State for Arms Control and International Security Affairs under Barack Obama

=== Federal appointees ===
==== Cabinet and sub-cabinet level officials ====
- Lawrence Eagleburger, former U.S. Secretary of State (1992-1993) under George H. W. Bush; served as a foreign policy advisor to the firm
- Ray Mabus, former U.S. Secretary of the Navy under Barack Obama (2009-2017); former Governor of the Mississippi from (1988-1992), and former United States Ambassador to Saudi Arabia from (1994 to 1996.

==== Other federal appointees ====
- David Addington, former Chief of Staff to Vice President Dick Cheney (2005-2009)
- Robb LaKritz, former advisor to the Deputy Secretary of the Treasury under George W. Bush
- James C. Duff, former director of the Administrative Office of the United States Courts

==== U.S. attorneys and judges ====
- Joe D. Whitley, former United States Attorney for the Northern District of Georgia (1990-1993); former General Counsel for the United States Department of Homeland Security.
- Tommy Parker, United States District Judge of the District Court for the Western District of Tennessee (2018-present).

=== Other figures ===
- Catherine Crosby, former Miss Alabama 2003.
- Lewis Donelson, former member of the Memphis City Council and major figure within the Tennessee Republican Party.
- Linda Klein, Immediate Past President of the American Bar Association.
