= Linda Klein (lawyer) =

American lawyer

Linda Klein is an American lawyer, past president of the American Bar Association, and senior managing shareholder at the Baker Donelson law firm.

== Education and academia ==
Klein received her bachelor's degree, cum laude, from Union College in 1980, and a J.D. from Washington & Lee University in 1983.

Klein has served on the boards of directors for multiple organizations, and is currently a member of the executive committee of the Buckhead Coalition, and is a board member of the Georgia Bar Foundation and OnBoard. Other previous roles include serving as president of the Board of Directors' Network, the Caucus of State Bars, Southface Energy Institute, and as chair of the Institute for Continuing Legal Education in Georgia and the Lawyers Foundation of Georgia. She currently serves on the advisory boards of Best Lawyers in America and Super Lawyers. Klein is also an advisory board member of the Cuba Consortium, an assembly of companies, non¬profit organizations, investors, academics, and entrepreneurs organized by The Howard Baker Forum, to track and examine the normalization process in the US and Cuba. She is a member of the American Law Institute, and serves as a mediator and arbitrator.

Klein has lectured in France, Sweden, Spain, Russia, Great Britain, Poland, Croatia, Canada and throughout the United States, and is the author of numerous published works.

== Career ==
=== State Bar of Georgia ===
In June 1997, Klein became the first woman to serve as president of the State Bar of Georgia. During her term, she advocated for the state to allocate funding to help indigent victims of domestic violence get legal help. A statewide group of community organizations and local and minority bar associations that she organized convinced the General Assembly to appropriate $2 million.

=== American Bar Association ===
Klein is immediate past president of the American Bar Association (ABA). During her term as ABA president, Klein's priorities included an effort to mobilize lawyers on behalf of enhanced legal services for the nation's veterans. In August 2016, she launched a Veterans Legal Services Initiative. The initiative focused on developing online resources to address the legal needs of veterans, and increasing the availability of legal services through law schools and bar associations by using new and under-employed lawyers, and promoting legal check-ups for veterans through VA medical facilities. The initiative resulted in an increase in pro bono services to veterans.

Klein also launched a campaign in support of Legal Services Corp. after funding for the provider of civil legal aid services was eliminated in a proposed federal budget. And under her leadership, the ABA filed a lawsuit against the U.S. Department of Education when the DOE changed its policy regarding eligibility under the Public Service Loan Forgiveness program, which allows those who work in non-profit sectors to have student loan debt forgiven.

Other priorities during Klein's term as ABA president included the ABA Blueprint, an initiative to help members be more efficient and productive; a non-partisan voting initiative that encouraged political participation; and an education commission tasked with studying and reporting on legal concerns from families struggling with a substandard education system.

Klein's previous ABA roles include chair of the ABA's House of Delegates, the association's policy making body; chair of the Tort Trial and Insurance Practice Section; chair of the committee on Rules and Calendar of the House of Delegates; chair of the Coalition for Justice, and chair of ABA Day, the association's Congressional outreach effort. Klein was also a recent member of the Council of the ABA Section of International law and served as a columnist and member of the Board of Editors of Law Practice Management Magazine. She continues to write a column for the magazine.

=== Law firm ===
A senior managing shareholder at Baker Donelson, Klein works frequently with clients in the construction, higher education and pharmaceutical industries and focuses on business dispute prevention and resolution, including contract law, employment law, professional liability, and risk management. Klein served a six-year term on the firm's Board of Directors. Before joining Baker Donelson, Klein served as Managing Partner of the Georgia based law firm of Gambrell & Stolz, LLP. As Managing Partner she led the merger of Gambrell & Stolz, LLP with Baker Donelson.
