= Clyde Arwood =

American executed by the U.S. Federal Government in Tennessee (1901–1943)

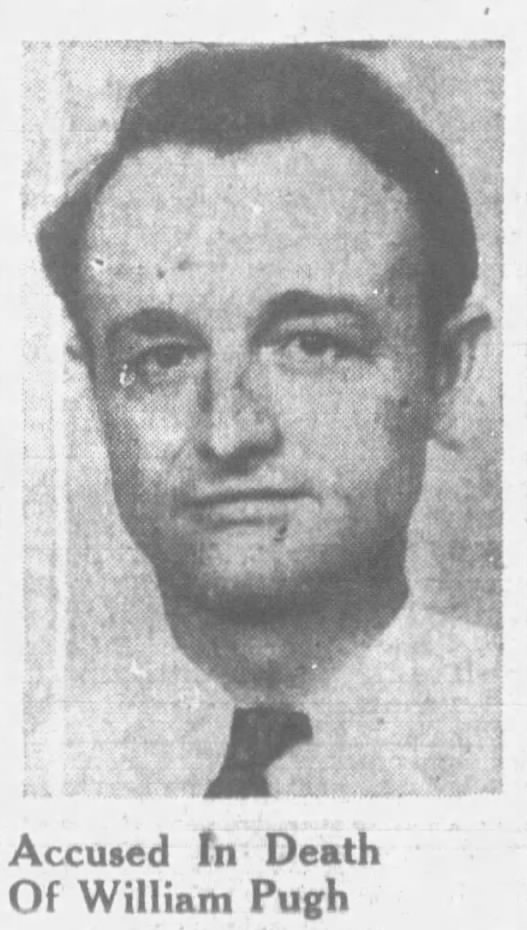
- Born: James Clyde Arwood; September 7, 1901; Ripley, Tennessee, U.S.
- Died: August 14, 1943 (aged 41); Tennessee State Penitentiary, Tennessee, U.S.
- Known for: Tennessee's only federal execution
- Status: Executed by electrocution
- Motive: To avoid arrest
- Convictions: Tennessee; Second degree murder Federal; First degree murder of a federal employee
- Penalty: Tennessee; 21 years imprisonment; commuted to 10 to 20 years imprisonment Federal; Death

Details
- Victims: 2

James Clyde Arwood (September 7, 1901 – August 14, 1943) was the only person executed by the United States federal government in Tennessee. He was sentenced to death after his conviction of murdering William Pugh, a federal agent, during a raid on Arwood's illegal still.

Arwood was executed in the electric chair at age 41 in Tennessee State Penitentiary in Nashville. Arwood was the last federal inmate executed under the administration of President Franklin D. Roosevelt.

== Early life ==
James Clyde Arwood was born in Ripley, Tennessee, on September 7, 1901, to James Monroe Arwood and Dora Arwood (née Akin). According to his death certificate, Arwood was employed as a barber. He was married to Bessie Arwood, although they divorced sometime before his execution.

=== Murder of J.W. Lunsford ===
On August 2, 1931, Deputy Sheriffs James Wyatt Lunsford and C.A. Borders went to the home of Arwood's brother, Cornelius Arwood, near Ripley, Tennessee, following a report that Clyde Arwood had beaten Cornelius's wife severely enough to break her arm in retaliation for her not giving him a pistol. At the time, Arwood was heavily intoxicated. Lunsford and Borders attempted to arrest Arwood, but Arwood resisted arrest. After some time, Arwood agreed to speak to Lunsford, but as Lunsford approached him, Arwood shot him with a shotgun. Lunsford remained in the hospital for several days, during which his left arm developed gangrene and had to be amputated. On Wednesday, August 5, Lunsford died from his injuries.

Arwood was arrested for Lunsford's death and held in the Lauderdale County Jail. He was charged with Lunsford's murder on Thursday, August 6. On June 28, 1932, Arwood was convicted of Lunsford's murder and sentenced to 21 years in state prison. On August 24, 1938, Governor Gordon Browning commuted Arwood's sentence to 10–20 years in prison, and he was released on parole effective that day. Arwood violated his parole about a year later, leading to his return to prison on either August 31 or October 31, 1939, but he was paroled again on February 16, 1940. Around the time of Arwood's execution, Lunsford was repeatedly misidentified in newspapers as "Wyde Lunsford."

== Murder of federal agent William Pugh ==
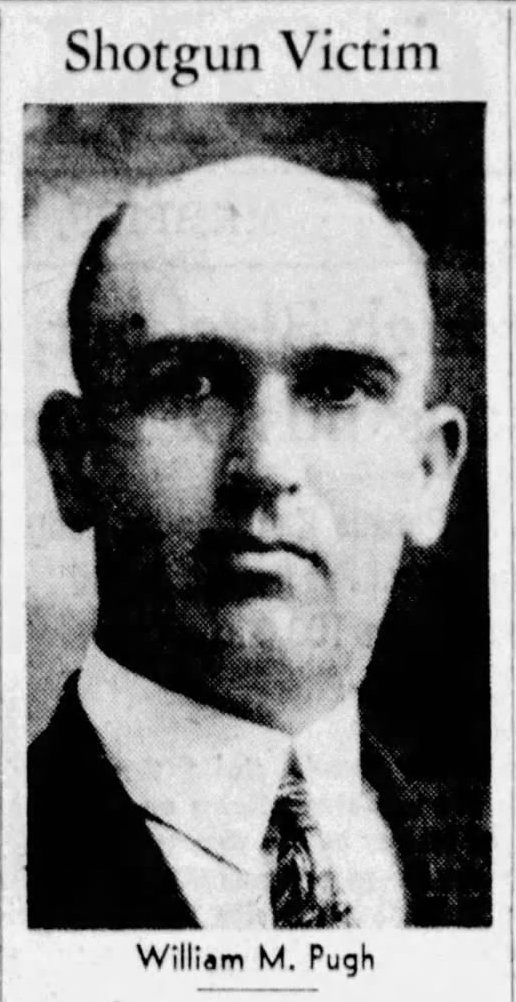
William Pugh, victim of murder by Clyde Arwood

Following Arwood's parole, Arwood moved back to Lauderdale County and began operating an illegal still, where he manufactured moonshine. Approximately one year later, on November 21, 1941, federal agents arrived at Arwood's home in west Lauderdale County, Tennessee, to arrest him for operating an unlicensed still. Before completing the arrest, Arwood requested to go back inside his house so he could bid farewell to his aged mother. Authorities allowed him to go back inside. Arwood reemerged from his house with a shotgun. He fired at William M. Pugh, a federal alcohol tax unit investigator and former federal prohibition agent from Memphis, Tennessee, and struck Pugh point-blank in the face. The shotgun wound mortally wounded Pugh, and although emergency medical services were summoned, Pugh died either on the way to the hospital, or within minutes of his arrival.

After the shooting, Arwood fled into the nearby woods, evading detection for hours while a posse searched the woods and swamps for him. Arwood later returned to his house and barricaded himself inside. At approximately 9:30 pm, the posse returned to Arwood's house and found the door locked. Realizing Arwood was inside, the posse opened fire on the house. Arwood fled to the attic as officers in the posse launched tear gas bombs into the house. Eventually, officers in the posse ran out of tear gas bombs and had to retrieve more; as their cars returned at approximately 3:30 am with more tear gas bombs, Arwood surrendered. He had not been injured. An officer later said, "We fired hundreds and hundreds of bullets into the house from all angles and never hit him. How we missed him is more than I can understand. He's a tough man."

== Indictment and trial ==
After his arrest, Arwood was interned in a jail in Shelby County. He was denied bond at a preliminary hearing. Prior to Arwood's case, Tennessee had never seen a federal murder trial. Prior to 1934, only cases involving officers employed with the United States Internal Revenue Service and Customs fell under U.S. federal jurisdiction. A new federal law after 1934 allowed cases involving all federal employees to fall under federal jurisdiction, meaning Arwood was eligible to be charged with murder in the West Tennessee Federal Courts, rather than in a state court.

On Friday, November 28, a federal grand jury indicted Arwood for the first-degree murder of William Pugh and three counts related to operating his illegal still and making illegal mash. The three counts related to the still carried a maximum punishment of six years imprisonment, while the first-degree murder charge carried a mandatory death sentence. After Arwood pleaded not guilty, his trial date was set at January 5, 1942.

=== Trial ===
Arwood's trial took place in January 1942 in the United States District Court for the Western District of Tennessee, in Memphis. Witnesses called to the stand at the trial included other federal agents who were with Pugh before and during the murder, as well as Pugh's widowed wife. One of the federal agents who was with Pugh, James Howes, was the principal witness; he described evidence linking Arwood to the illegal still, including a watch they found which Arwood's mother confirmed as his. Howes also testified to having observed Arwood chopping trees in the nearby woods on an earlier occasion, suggesting Arwood lived near the area. Another federal employee, Howard Taylor, displayed Pugh's daily reports wherein Pugh surmised that Arwood owned the still.

Another witness at the trial was Arwood's 70-year-old mother. During her testimony, Arwood's mother detailed his chronic drunkenness, alcoholism, and patterns of strange behavior. She also testified that she was in the house in which Arwood barricaded himself after Pugh's murder and that she was almost hit by the gunfire from the posse outside. At one point during her testimony, she collapsed on the stand, prompting Arwood to break down in tears, in contrast to the stoicism he had maintained during the other trial proceedings. The testimony of Arwood's mother, as well as the testimonies of other relatives corroborating Arwood's alcoholism and strange behavior, went towards his defense strategy of entering a plea of temporary insanity, wherein Arwood confessed to murdering Pugh but maintained that he was legally not of sound mind during the killing.

After a three-day trial, the jury rejected Arwood's insanity plea and convicted him of Pugh's murder on January 11, 1942. They did not offer a recommendation that Arwood be given mercy, making a death sentence mandatory. Arwood's attorney, Bailey Walsh, motioned for a new trial; a meeting was therefore scheduled for January 26, 1942, so Arwood's attorneys could argue in favor of a new trial or for a judge to challenge the jury's failure to recommend mercy for Arwood.

During the January 26 hearing, United States federal judge Marion Speed Boyd rejected Arwood's motion for a new trial and formally sentenced Arwood to death. Arwood was reportedly emotionless during his sentencing. The execution was first scheduled to take place on June 1, 1942.

== Appeals, imprisonment, and execution ==
Appeals delayed the execution of Arwood's sentence for approximately one year. After the motion for a new trial was denied and Arwood was formally sentenced to death, he and his attorneys appealed to the United States Court of Appeals for the Sixth Circuit. By a 2–1 vote, the Sixth Circuit Court of Appeals upheld Arwood's conviction and death sentence, with Judges Xen Hicks and Florence E. Allen affirming. The lone dissent came from Judge Elwood Hamilton, who questioned Pugh's authority to be on Arwood's property at the time, as well as Pugh's authority to conduct the arrest preceding his murder.

Until shortly before the execution was to take place, Arwood was housed at the Shelby County Jail; afterwards, he was transported to the Tennessee State Penitentiary in Nashville, where Tennessee's execution chamber was located at the time.

Arwood personally wrote to U.S. President Franklin D. Roosevelt and First Lady Eleanor Roosevelt requesting clemency and a commutation of his death sentence. Weeks prior to the execution, U.S. Attorney General Francis Biddle informed Arwood that President Franklin D. Roosevelt had denied clemency, allowing the execution to move forward.

Tennessee State Penitentiary Warden Thomas P. Gore described Arwood as a good prisoner and that Arwood made very few requests during his time on death row, only asking for a daily copy of the local newspaper so he could keep up with World War II news. He also requested that his civilian clothes be given to his brothers following his execution, opting to wear prison garb instead. Arwood spent his last minutes with his brothers, who departed only a few minutes before the execution took place.

Arwood walked to the execution chamber at 5:30 a.m., and he was strapped into the electric chair at 5:35 a.m. After walking into the execution chamber, Arwood said, "Goodbye, friends." When asked for a formal final statement, Arwood only replied, "That's all." The prison physician pronounced him dead five minutes later, at 5:40 a.m. The execution was supervised by Charles W. Miles, the United States Marshal for the western district of Tennessee, who was assisted by Tennessee State Penitentiary Deputy Warden Glenn Swafford.

== See also ==
- List of people executed by electrocution
- Capital punishment by the United States federal government
- List of people executed by the United States federal government
- List of people executed in the United States in 1943
