= Harry Phillips (judge) =

American judge (1909–1985)

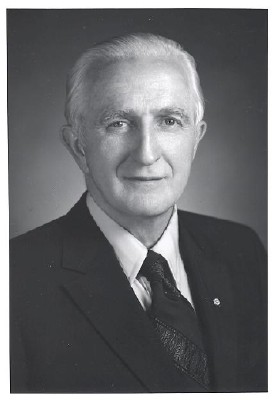

Senior Judge of the United States Court of Appeals for the Sixth Circuit
- In office January 15, 1979 – August 3, 1985

Chief Judge of the United States Court of Appeals for the Sixth Circuit
- In office 1969–1979
- Preceded by: Paul Charles Weick
- Succeeded by: George Clifton Edwards Jr.

Judge of the United States Court of Appeals for the Sixth Circuit
- In office July 3, 1963 – January 15, 1979
- Appointed by: John F. Kennedy
- Preceded by: John Donelson Martin Sr.
- Succeeded by: Bailey Brown

Personal details
- Born: Harry Phillips; July 28, 1909 Watertown, Tennessee, U.S.
- Died: August 3, 1985 (aged 76) London, England
- Education: Cumberland University (AB); Cumberland School of Law (LLB)

Harry Phillips (July 28, 1909 – August 3, 1985) was a United States circuit judge of the United States Court of Appeals for the Sixth Circuit.

== Education and career ==
Born in Watertown, Tennessee, Phillips received an Artium Baccalaureus degree from Cumberland University in 1932 and a Bachelor of Laws from Cumberland School of Law in 1933. He was in private practice in Watertown from 1935 to 1937, and served as a member of the Tennessee House of Representatives from 1935 to 1937, and then as an assistant state attorney general of Tennessee from 1937 to 1943. He was in the United States Navy during World War II, from 1943 to 1946, achieving the rank of Lieutenant Commander. He was again an assistant state attorney general of Tennessee from 1946 to 1950, thereafter returning to private practice in Nashville, Tennessee from 1950 to 1963.

== Federal judicial service ==
On June 4, 1963, Phillips was nominated by President John F. Kennedy to a seat on the United States Court of Appeals for the Sixth Circuit vacated by Judge John Donelson Martin Sr. Phillips was confirmed by the United States Senate on June 28, 1963, and received his commission on July 3, 1963. He served as Chief Judge from 1969 to 1979, assuming senior status on January 15, 1979 and serving in that capacity until his death on August 3, 1985, in London, England, due to injuries suffered from being struck by the driver of a vehicle while crossing a street in London.

== Posthumous Legacy ==
In 1986, the United States Court of Appeals for the Sixth Circuit named its Nashville satellite library after Judge Phillips in recognition of his lifelong commitment to legal scholarship.

The Harry Phillips American Inn of Court (AIC) was founded in 1990 in Nashville, Tennessee. It is the 120th American Inn of Court in the United States. From 1990 to 2011, approximately 400 lawyers, judges, law professors, and law students living and working in Middle Tennessee have been members of the Harry Phillips AIC. As one of its first official acts, the Inn adopted the name "Harry Phillips American Inn of Court."

== Sources ==
- "Harry Phillips American Inn of Court". harryphillipsaic.com.

Legal offices
Preceded by John Donelson Martin Sr.	Judge of the United States Court of Appeals for the Sixth Circuit; 1963–1979	Succeeded by Bailey Brown
Preceded by Paul Charles Weick	Chief Judge of the United States Court of Appeals for the Sixth Circuit; 1969–1979	Succeeded by George Clifton Edwards Jr.
