= Samuel H. Mays Jr. =

American judge (born 1948)

Senior Judge of the United States District Court for the Western District of Tennessee
- Incumbent
- Assumed office July 1, 2015

Judge of the United States District Court for the Western District of Tennessee
- In office May 10, 2002 – July 1, 2015
- Appointed by: George W. Bush
- Preceded by: Jerome Turner
- Succeeded by: Tommy Parker

Personal details
- Born: 1948 (age 77–78) Memphis, Tennessee, U.S.
- Education: Amherst College (BA); Yale University (JD)

Samuel Hardwicke Mays Jr. (born 1948) is a senior United States district judge for the Western District of Tennessee.

== Early life and education ==
Mays was born in 1948 in Memphis, Tennessee. He received a Bachelor of Arts degree from Amherst College in 1970 and a Juris Doctor from Yale Law School in 1973, where he served on the editorial board of The Yale Law Journal.

== Career ==
Mays practiced at Baker Donelson in Memphis from 1973 to 1995. He then worked in the office of the governor as legal counsel for two years, and then as deputy and chief of staff to Governor Don Sundquist for three years, until 2000. Mays returned to private practice as a partner at Baker Donelson for the next two year.

== Federal judicial service ==
On January 23, 2002, Mays was nominated by President George W. Bush to a seat on the United States District Court for the Western District of Tennessee vacated by Jerome Turner. He was confirmed by the United States Senate on May 9, 2002, received his commission on May 10, 2002, and then assumed senior status on July 1, 2015.

== Notable cases ==
Mays presided over federal litigation arising from the consolidation of Memphis City Schools and Shelby County Schools, which produced one of the largest school district mergers in United States history. In August 2011, he ruled that the Memphis City Schools board had acted lawfully in surrendering its charter, allowing for the two systems to merge under Shelby County administration. In November 2012, Mays ruled that state legislation enabling six Shelby County suburbs to establish independent school districts violated the Tennessee Constitution. His ruling voided the August 2012 referendum in which suburban voters had approved the new districts. In response, the Tennessee legislature passed House Bill 1288, repealing a fifteen-year statewide prohibition on new municipal school districts, which Governor Bill Haslam signed into law on April 24, 2013.

Legal offices
Preceded by Jerome Turner	Judge of the United States District Court for the Western District of Tennessee; 2002–2015	Succeeded by Tommy Parker
