= Harry W. Wellford =

American judge (1924–2021)

Senior Judge of the United States Court of Appeals for the Sixth Circuit
- In office January 15, 1991 – April 17, 2021

Judge of the United States Court of Appeals for the Sixth Circuit
- In office August 20, 1982 – January 15, 1991
- Appointed by: Ronald Reagan
- Preceded by: Bailey Brown
- Succeeded by: Eugene E. Siler Jr.

Judge of the United States District Court for the Western District of Tennessee
- In office December 12, 1970 – September 10, 1982
- Appointed by: Richard Nixon
- Preceded by: Seat established by 84 Stat. 294
- Succeeded by: Julia Smith Gibbons

Personal details
- Born: Harry Walker Wellford; August 6, 1924 Memphis, Tennessee, U.S.
- Died: April 17, 2021 (aged 96) Memphis, Tennessee, U.S.
- Education: Washington and Lee University (BA); Vanderbilt University Law School (LLB)

Harry Walker Wellford (August 6, 1924 – April 17, 2021) was a United States circuit judge of the United States Court of Appeals for the Sixth Circuit and a United States district judge of the United States District Court for the Western District of Tennessee.

== Education and early career ==
Wellford was born on August 6, 1924, in Memphis, Tennessee. He received a Bachelor of Arts degree from Washington and Lee University in 1947. He received a Bachelor of Laws from Vanderbilt University Law School in 1950. He was in the United States Navy as an Ensign from 1944 to 1946. He was in private practice of law in Memphis from 1950 to 1970. He also was active in political affairs, managing the successful campaigns of Howard Baker for United States Senate in 1966 and Winfield Dunn for Governor of Tennessee in 1970.

== Federal judicial service ==
Wellford was nominated by President Richard Nixon on November 24, 1970, to the United States District Court for the Western District of Tennessee, to a new seat created by 84 Stat. 294. He was confirmed by the United States Senate on December 11, 1970, and received commission on December 12, 1970. His service was terminated on September 10, 1982, due to elevation to the Sixth Circuit.

On August 4, 1976 President Gerald Ford nominated Wellford to a seat on the United States Court of Appeals for the Sixth Circuit to replace William Ernest Miller, who had died on April 12, 1976. Civil rights groups objected to Wellford's nomination and, with the nomination coming so late in Ford's presidency, the Senate never took a vote on his nomination before Ford left office. President Jimmy Carter declined to renominate Wellford when he took office, nominating Gilbert S. Merritt Jr. instead.

On July 27, 1982, he was nominated by President Ronald Reagan, to a seat on the United States Court of Appeals for the Sixth Circuit vacated by Judge Bailey Brown. He was confirmed by the Senate on August 20, 1982, and received commission the same day. He assumed senior status on January 15, 1991.

== Personal life ==
Wellford was married to Katherine Estes Potts Wellford, and they had five children. He died in Memphis in April 2021 at the age of 96.

== See also ==
- Gerald Ford judicial appointment controversies
- List of United States federal judges by longevity of service

== Sources ==
Legal offices
Preceded by Seat established by 84 Stat. 294	Judge of the United States District Court for the Western District of Tennessee; 1970–1982	Succeeded by Julia Smith Gibbons
Preceded by Bailey Brown	Judge of the United States Court of Appeals for the Sixth Circuit; 1982–1991	Succeeded by Eugene Edward Siler Jr.
