= Jerome Turner =

American judge

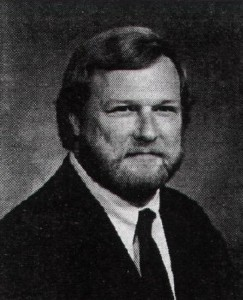

Judge of the United States District Court for the Western District of Tennessee
- In office December 9, 1987 – February 12, 2000
- Appointed by: Ronald Reagan
- Preceded by: Robert Malcolm McRae Jr.
- Succeeded by: Samuel H. Mays Jr.

Personal details
- Born: February 18, 1942 Memphis, Tennessee
- Died: February 12, 2000 (aged 57) Memphis, Tennessee
- Education: Washington and Lee University (B.A.); Washington and Lee University School of Law (LL.B.)

Jerome Turner (February 18, 1942 – February 12, 2000) was a United States district judge of the United States District Court for the Western District of Tennessee.

== Education and career ==
Born in Memphis, Tennessee, Turner received a Bachelor of Arts degree from Washington and Lee University in 1964 and a Bachelor of Laws from Washington and Lee University School of Law in 1966. He was a law clerk for Judge Robert Malcolm McRae Jr. of the United States District Court for the Western District of Tennessee from 1966 to 1967. He was in private practice in Memphis from 1967 to 1988.

== Federal judicial service ==
On July 1, 1987, Turner was nominated by President Ronald Reagan to the very seat on the United States District Court for the Western District of Tennessee vacated by McRae. Turner was confirmed by the United States Senate on December 8, 1987, and received his commission on December 9, 1987. Turner served in that capacity until his death, on February 12, 2000, in Memphis.

== Sources ==
Legal offices
Preceded by Robert Malcolm McRae Jr.	Judge of the United States District Court for the Western District of Tennessee; 1987–2000	Succeeded by Samuel H. Mays Jr.
