= Andre Mathis =

American judge (born 1980)

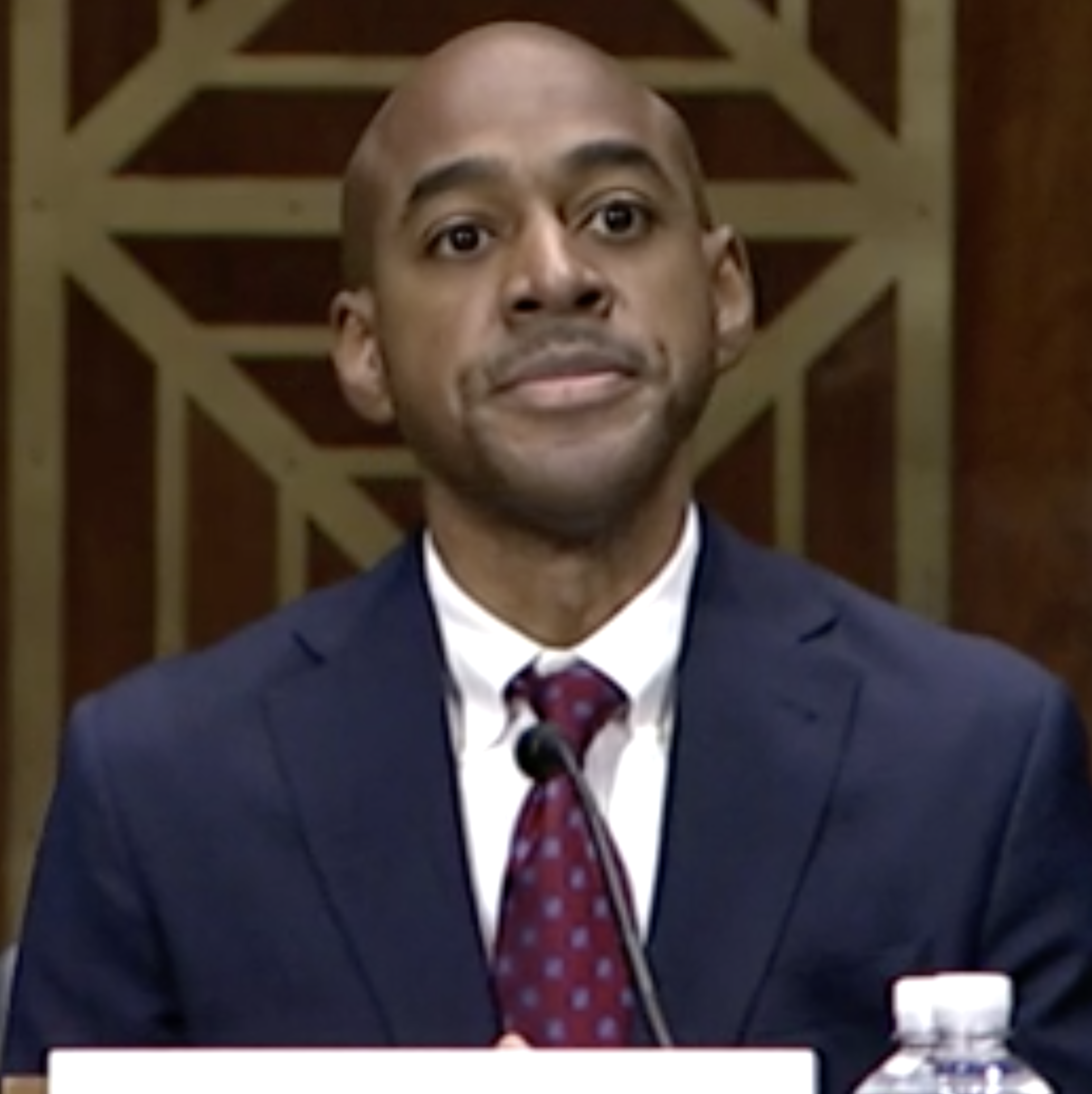

Judge of the United States Court of Appeals for the Sixth Circuit
- Incumbent
- Assumed office September 27, 2022
- Appointed by: Joe Biden
- Preceded by: Bernice B. Donald

Personal details
- Born: Andre Bernard Mathis; 1980 (age 45–46) Memphis, Tennessee, U.S.
- Education: University of Memphis (BA, JD)

Andre Bernard Mathis (born 1980) is an American lawyer who is serving as a United States circuit judge of the United States Court of Appeals for the Sixth Circuit.

== Education ==
Mathis earned a Bachelor of Arts from the University of Memphis in 2003 and a Juris Doctor from the Cecil C. Humphreys School of Law at the University of Memphis in 2007.

== Career ==
After graduating from law school, Mathis joined the Memphis law firm of Glankler Brown as an associate. He worked in criminal defense as a member of the Criminal Justice Act Panel for the Western District of Tennessee and with the Tennessee Innocence Project. He served as a member of the Magistrate Judge Merit Selection Panel for the United States District Court for the Western District of Tennessee from 2010 to 2011 and again from 2019 to 2020. He was also a member of the Federal Defender Evaluation Committee for the United States Court of Appeals for the Sixth Circuit from 2012 to 2013. He served on the Disciplinary Hearing Committee of the Tennessee Board of Professional Responsibility from 2015 to 2021 and on the Shelby County Ethics Commission from 2013 to 2017.

In January 2020, Mathis joined the Memphis office of Butler Snow LLP.

=== Federal judicial service ===
On November 17, 2021, President Joe Biden announced his intent to nominate Mathis to serve as a United States circuit judge for the United States Court of Appeals for the Sixth Circuit; his nomination was sent to the Senate the following day. President Biden nominated Mathis to the seat vacated by Judge Bernice B. Donald, who announced her intent to assume senior status upon confirmation of her successor. The nomination drew controversy, as both senators from Tennessee had declined to return favorable blue slips and said that the White House had not consulted with them. On January 3, 2022, his nomination was returned to the President under Rule XXXI, Paragraph 6 of the United States Senate; he was renominated later the same day.

On January 12, 2022, a contentious hearing on his nomination was held before the Senate Judiciary Committee. During the hearing, Senator Marsha Blackburn complained that not only had she not turned in a blue slip, but that she had never been sent a blue slip asking whether she supported the nomination, something that had never happened before. Senate Judiciary Committee Chairman Dick Durbin conceded that this was a serious mistake and apologized, but said that Mathis was personally blameless for the oversight. Blackburn then said she had "serious concerns" about Mathis' lack of experience in federal law and referenced his "rap sheet" due in part to three previous speeding tickets that he didn't respond to. She stated, "He has a rap sheet with a laundry list of citations, including multiple failures to appear in court. In Tennessee, we expect our judges to respect the law. If Mr. Mathis thought he was above the law before, imagine how he'll conduct himself if he's confirmed as a federal judge." Blackburn and fellow senator Bill Hagerty had recommended an alternative pick, Camille McMullen, a Democratic appointee to the Tennessee Court of Criminal Appeals who is also Black.

On February 10, 2022, his nomination was favorably reported by the committee by a 12–10 vote. On August 7, 2022, Majority Leader Chuck Schumer filed cloture on his nomination. On September 7, 2022, the United States Senate invoked cloture on his nomination by a 48–45 vote. On September 8, 2022, his nomination was confirmed by a 48–47 vote. Senator John Kennedy broke ranks with his Republican colleagues to help confirm Mathis, the first Black man to be confirmed to any federal circuit court in 3,160 days since Robert L. Wilkins was confirmed to the United States Court of Appeals for the District of Columbia Circuit on January 13, 2014. He received his judicial commission on September 27, 2022.

== See also ==
- Joe Biden judicial appointment controversies
- List of African American federal judges
- List of African American jurists

Legal offices
Preceded by Bernice B. Donald	Judge of the United States Court of Appeals for the Sixth Circuit; 2022–present	Incumbent
