= Odell Horton =

American judge (1929–2006)

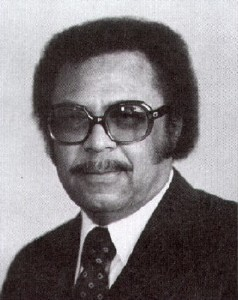

Senior Judge of the United States District Court for the Western District of Tennessee
- In office May 16, 1995 – February 22, 2006

Chief Judge of the United States District Court for the Western District of Tennessee
- In office 1987–1994
- Preceded by: Robert Malcolm McRae Jr.
- Succeeded by: Julia Smith Gibbons

Judge of the United States District Court for the Western District of Tennessee
- In office May 12, 1980 – May 16, 1995
- Appointed by: Jimmy Carter
- Preceded by: Bailey Brown
- Succeeded by: Bernice B. Donald

Personal details
- Born: Odell Horton; May 13, 1929 Bolivar, Tennessee, U.S.
- Died: February 22, 2006 (aged 76) Memphis, Tennessee, U.S.
- Education: Morehouse College (BA); Howard University School of Law (LLB)

Odell Horton (May 13, 1929 – February 22, 2006) was a United States district judge of the United States District Court for the Western District of Tennessee.

== Education and career ==
Born in Bolivar, Tennessee, Horton served in the United States Marine Corps from 1946 to 1947, and again from 1951 to 1953. He received a Bachelor of Arts degree from Morehouse College in 1951, where he was a member of Alpha Phi Alpha fraternity, and received a Bachelor of Laws from Howard University School of Law in 1956. He was in private practice in Memphis, Tennessee from 1957 to 1962. He was an Assistant United States Attorney of the Western District of Tennessee from 1962 to 1968. He was the director of the Division of Hospital and Health Services for the City of Memphis in 1968. He was a judge of the Shelby County Criminal Court in Tennessee from 1969 to 1970, and was then president of LeMoyne–Owen College from 1970 to 1974, also appearing as a commentator on WREC-TV (CBS) from 1972 to 1974. He was the director of Community Health Services, Mid-South Medical Center Council in Memphis from 1974 to 1976. He then served as a United States Bankruptcy Judge in the Western District of Tennessee from 1976 to 1980.

== Federal judicial service ==
On February 27, 1980, Horton was nominated by President Jimmy Carter to a seat on the United States District Court for the Western District of Tennessee vacated by Judge Bailey Brown. Horton was confirmed by the United States Senate on May 9, 1980, and received his commission on May 12, 1980. He served as Chief Judge from 1987 to 1994. He assumed senior status on May 16, 1995. Horton served in that capacity until his death of respiratory failure on February 22, 2006, in Memphis.

== See also ==
- List of African-American federal judges
- List of African-American jurists
- List of first minority male lawyers and judges in Tennessee

== Sources ==
Legal offices
Preceded by Bailey Brown	Judge of the United States District Court for the Western District of Tennessee; 1980–1995	Succeeded by Bernice B. Donald
Preceded by Robert Malcolm McRae Jr.	Chief Judge of the United States District Court for the Western District of Tennessee; 1987–1994	Succeeded by Julia Smith Gibbons
