= Bernice B. Donald =

American judge (born 1951)

Bernice Donald
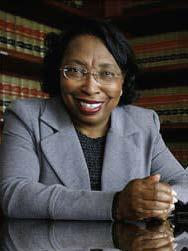

Senior Judge of the United States Court of Appeals for the Sixth Circuit
- In office September 27, 2022 – January 20, 2023

Judge of the United States Court of Appeals for the Sixth Circuit
- In office September 8, 2011 – September 27, 2022
- Appointed by: Barack Obama
- Preceded by: Ronald Lee Gilman
- Succeeded by: Andre Mathis

Judge of the United States District Court for the Western District of Tennessee
- In office December 26, 1995 – September 8, 2011
- Appointed by: Bill Clinton
- Preceded by: Odell Horton
- Succeeded by: John T. Fowlkes Jr.

Personal details
- Born: Bernice Bouie; September 17, 1951 (age 75) DeSoto County, Mississippi, U.S.
- Education: University of Memphis (BA, JD)

Bernice B. Donald (née Bouie; born September 17, 1951) is an American lawyer and former federal judge. She served as a United States circuit judge of the United States Court of Appeals for the Sixth Circuit from 2011 to 2023. She previously served as a United States district judge for the United States District Court for the Western District of Tennessee from 1995 to 2011. In January 2024, she became a member of the law firm of Burch, Porter and Johnson, PLLC.

== Biography ==
Donald was born in DeSoto County, Mississippi. She received a Bachelor of Arts degree from University of Memphis in 1974 and a Juris Doctor from University of Memphis School of Law in 1979. She was in private practice in Memphis, Tennessee, from 1979 to 1980, then became a staff attorney of the Employment Law & Economic Development Unit, Memphis Area Legal Services, Tennessee in 1980. Donald was an assistant public defender in the Shelby County Public Defender's Office, Tennessee from 1980 to 1982. From 1985 to 1988, she was an adjunct professor at Cecil C. Humphreys School of Law.

After her retirement from the bench, Judge Bernice Bouie Donald joined the law firm of Burch, Porter and Johnson, PLLC.

== Judicial career ==
=== State judicial service ===
Donald was a judge on Tennessee's General Sessions Criminal Court from 1982 to 1988, also teaching as an adjunct professor at Southwest Tennessee Community College from 1984 to 1989. Donald became a member of Zeta Phi Beta sorority Alpha Eta Zeta chapter (Memphis, Tennessee) in 1983.

=== Federal judicial service ===
==== Bankruptcy court service ====
From 1988 to 1995, Donald served as a United States bankruptcy judge for the Western District of Tennessee.

==== District court service ====
On December 7, 1995, she was nominated by President Bill Clinton to a seat on the United States District Court for the Western District of Tennessee vacated by Odell Horton. She was confirmed by the United States Senate on December 22, 1995, and received her commission on December 26, 1995. Her service as a U.S. district judge was terminated on September 8, 2011, when she was elevated to the federal appellate court.

==== Court of appeals service ====
On December 1, 2010, President Barack Obama nominated Donald for a judgeship on the United States Court of Appeals for the Sixth Circuit to replace Judge Ronald Lee Gilman who assumed senior status on November 21, 2010. The Senate confirmed Donald on September 6, 2011, by a 96–2 vote. She received her commission on September 8, 2011. On September 8, 2022, her successor, Andre Mathis, was confirmed by the Senate. Donald assumed senior status on September 27, 2022, and retired from active service on January 20, 2023.

== See also ==
- List of African-American federal judges
- List of African-American jurists
- List of first women lawyers and judges in the United States
- List of first women lawyers and judges in Tennessee

Legal offices
Preceded by Odell Horton	Judge of the United States District Court for the Western District of Tennessee; 1995–2011	Succeeded by John T. Fowlkes Jr.
Preceded by Ronald Lee Gilman	Judge of the United States Court of Appeals for the Sixth Circuit; 2011–2022	Succeeded by Andre Mathis
