= Tommy Parker (judge) =

American judge (born 1963)

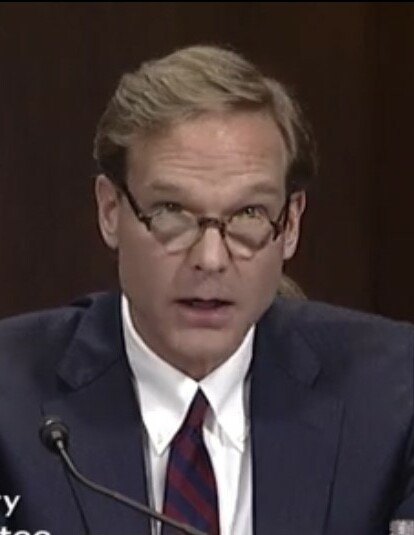

Judge of the United States District Court for the Western District of Tennessee
- Incumbent
- Assumed office January 30, 2018
- Appointed by: Donald Trump
- Preceded by: Samuel H. Mays Jr.

Personal details
- Born: Thomas Lee Robinson Parker; 1963 (age 62–63) Memphis, Tennessee, U.S.
- Education: University of South Carolina (BS); Vanderbilt University (JD)

Thomas Lee Robinson "Tommy" Parker (born 1963) is a United States district judge of the United States District Court for the Western District of Tennessee.

== Education and career ==
Parker received a Bachelor of Science degree in 1985 from the University of South Carolina. He received a Juris Doctor in 1989 from Vanderbilt University School of Law. Parker began his legal career as an associate at Waring Cox Lawyers in Memphis, Tennessee. He then served as an assistant United States attorney in the Western District of Tennessee for nine years. Before becoming a federal judge, he was a shareholder in the Memphis office of Baker, Donelson, Bearman, Caldwell & Berkowitz, P.C., where he represented clients in civil litigation and criminal matters. Additionally, he previously served as president of the Memphis Bar Association and is a fellow in the American College of Trial Lawyers.

=== Federal judicial service ===
On July 13, 2017, President Donald Trump nominated Parker to serve as a United States district judge of the United States District Court for the Western District of Tennessee, to the seat vacated by Judge Samuel H. Mays Jr., who assumed senior status on July 1, 2015. A hearing on his nomination before the Senate Judiciary Committee was held on September 6, 2017. On October 5, 2017, his nomination was reported out of committee by a voice vote. On January 9, 2018, the United States Senate invoked cloture on his nomination by a 96–1 vote. On January 10, 2018, his nomination was confirmed by a 98–0 vote. He received his commission on January 30, 2018. He was sworn into office on February 2, 2018.

=== Notable ruling ===
On June 2, 2023, Parker ruled Tennessee's drag ban unconstitutional.

Legal offices
Preceded by Samuel H. Mays Jr.	Judge of the United States District Court for the Western District of Tennessee; 2018–present	Incumbent
