= John Donelson Martin Sr. =

American judge (1883–1962)

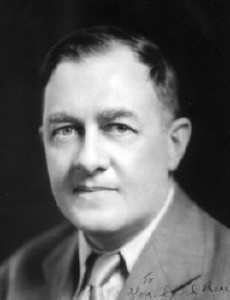
- Martin in 1940

Chief Judge of the United States Court of Appeals for the Sixth Circuit
- In office 1959
- Preceded by: Florence E. Allen
- Succeeded by: Thomas Francis McAllister

Judge of the United States Court of Appeals for the Sixth Circuit
- In office September 4, 1940 – April 2, 1962
- Appointed by: Franklin D. Roosevelt
- Preceded by: Seat established by 54 Stat. 219
- Succeeded by: Harry Phillips

Judge of the United States District Court for the Western District of Tennessee
- In office May 3, 1935 – September 16, 1940
- Appointed by: Franklin D. Roosevelt
- Preceded by: Harry B. Anderson
- Succeeded by: Marion Speed Boyd

Personal details
- Born: John Donelson Martin; May 4, 1883 Memphis, Tennessee, U.S.
- Died: April 2, 1962 (aged 78)
- Education: University of Virginia School of Law (LLB)

John Donelson Martin Sr. (May 4, 1883 – April 2, 1962) was a United States circuit judge of the United States Court of Appeals for the Sixth Circuit and previously was a United States district judge of the United States District Court for the Western District of Tennessee.

== Education and career ==
Born in Memphis, Tennessee, Martin received a Bachelor of Laws from the University of Virginia School of Law in 1905. He was in private practice in Memphis from 1905 to 1935.

== Federal judicial service ==
Martin was nominated by President Franklin D. Roosevelt on April 22, 1935, to a seat on the United States District Court for the Western District of Tennessee vacated by Judge Harry B. Anderson. He was confirmed by the United States Senate on April 30, 1935, and received his commission on May 3, 1935. His service terminated on September 16, 1940, due to his elevation to the Sixth Circuit.

Martin was nominated by President Roosevelt on August 12, 1940, to the United States Court of Appeals for the Sixth Circuit, to a new seat authorized by 54 Stat. 219. He was confirmed by the Senate on August 27, 1940, and received his commission on September 4, 1940. He served as Chief Judge and as a member of the Judicial Conference of the United States in 1959. His service terminated on April 2, 1962, due to his death.

== Family ==
John Donelson Martin Sr. (or III) was a son of John Donelson Martin Jr. (or II) (1858–1890) and Mary Walker Hull (1859–1906). Martin was the grandson of John Donelson Martin (1830-1862), who served as a Confederate Colonel in the American Civil War and was killed at the age of 32 at the Second Battle of Corinth.

== Sources ==
Legal offices
Preceded by Harry B. Anderson	Judge of the United States District Court for the Western District of Tennessee; 1935–1940	Succeeded by Marion Speed Boyd
Preceded by Seat established by 54 Stat. 219	Judge of the United States Court of Appeals for the Sixth Circuit; 1940–1962	Succeeded by Harry Phillips
Preceded by Florence E. Allen	Chief Judge of the United States Court of Appeals for the Sixth Circuit; 1959	Succeeded by Thomas Francis McAllister
