= John T. Fowlkes Jr. =

American judge (born 1951)

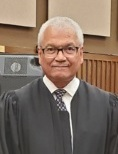
- Fowlkes in 2022

Senior Judge of the United States District Court for the Western District of Tennessee
- Incumbent
- Assumed office September 1, 2022

Judge of the United States District Court for the Western District of Tennessee
- In office August 1, 2012 – September 1, 2022
- Appointed by: Barack Obama
- Preceded by: Bernice B. Donald
- Succeeded by: Brian C. Lea

Personal details
- Born: April 20, 1951 (age 74) Washington, D.C., U.S.
- Education: Valparaiso University (BA); University of Denver (JD)

John Thomas Fowlkes Jr. (born April 20, 1951) is a senior United States district judge of the United States District Court for the Western District of Tennessee.

== Biography ==
Fowlkes was born in Washington, D.C. He received a Bachelor of Arts in 1975 from Valparaiso University and a Juris Doctor in 1977 from the University of Denver School of Law. He began his career as an assistant public defender in the Shelby County Public Defender's Office in Memphis, Tennessee. He served as an assistant district attorney general in the Shelby County District Attorney General's Office from 1979 to 1989. He then served as an assistant United States attorney in the Western District of Tennessee from 1989 to 2002. He was chief administrative officer of the Shelby County government from 2002 to 2007. He was a judge of the Shelby County Criminal Court from 2007 to 2012.

=== Federal judicial service ===
On December 16, 2011, President Barack Obama nominated Fowlkes to be a United States district judge of the United States District Court for the Western District of Tennessee. He was nominated to the seat vacated by Judge Bernice Bouie Donald who was elevated to the United States Court of Appeals for the Sixth Circuit on September 8, 2011. He received a hearing before the Senate Judiciary Committee on March 14, 2012, and his nomination was reported to the floor on April 19, 2012, by voice vote, with Senator Mike Lee recorded as voting no. On July 10, 2012, the Senate voted to confirm Fowlkes in a 94–2 vote. He received his commission on August 1, 2012. He assumed senior status on September 1, 2022.

== See also ==
- List of African-American federal judges
- List of African-American jurists

Legal offices
Preceded by Bernice B. Donald	Judge of the United States District Court for the Western District of Tennessee; 2012–2022	Succeeded by Brian C. Lea
