= Harry B. Anderson =

American judge

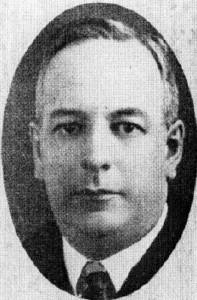

Judge of the United States District Court for the Western District of Tennessee
- In office September 12, 1925 – April 9, 1935
- Appointed by: Calvin Coolidge
- Preceded by: John William Ross
- Succeeded by: John Donelson Martin Sr.

Personal details
- Born: Harry Bennett Anderson; November 5, 1879 Van Buren County, Michigan, U.S.
- Died: April 9, 1935 (aged 55)
- Party: Republican
- Education: University of Chicago (Ph.B.); Christian Brothers University (A.M.); Columbia Law School (LL.B.)

Harry Bennett Anderson (November 5, 1879 – April 9, 1935) was a United States district judge of the United States District Court for the Western District of Tennessee.

== Education and career ==
Born in Van Buren County, Michigan, Anderson received a Bachelor of Philosophy degree from the University of Chicago, an Artium Magister degree from Christian Brothers College (now Christian Brothers University), followed by a Bachelor of Laws from Columbia Law School in 1904. He was in private practice in Memphis, Tennessee from 1904 to 1917, and was a member of the Republican state committee from 1904 to 1910. He was a lieutenant colonel in the United States Army during World War I from 1917 to 1918, thereafter returning to private practice in Memphis until 1925.

== Federal judicial service ==
Anderson received a recess appointment from President Calvin Coolidge on September 12, 1925, to a seat on the United States District Court for the Western District of Tennessee vacated by Judge John William Ross. He was nominated to the same position by President Coolidge on December 8, 1925. He was confirmed by the United States Senate on January 29, 1926, and received his commission the same day. His service terminated on April 9, 1935, due to his death.

== Sources ==
Legal offices
Preceded by John William Ross	Judge of the United States District Court for the Western District of Tennessee; 1925–1935	Succeeded by John Donelson Martin Sr.
