= John William Ross =

American judge

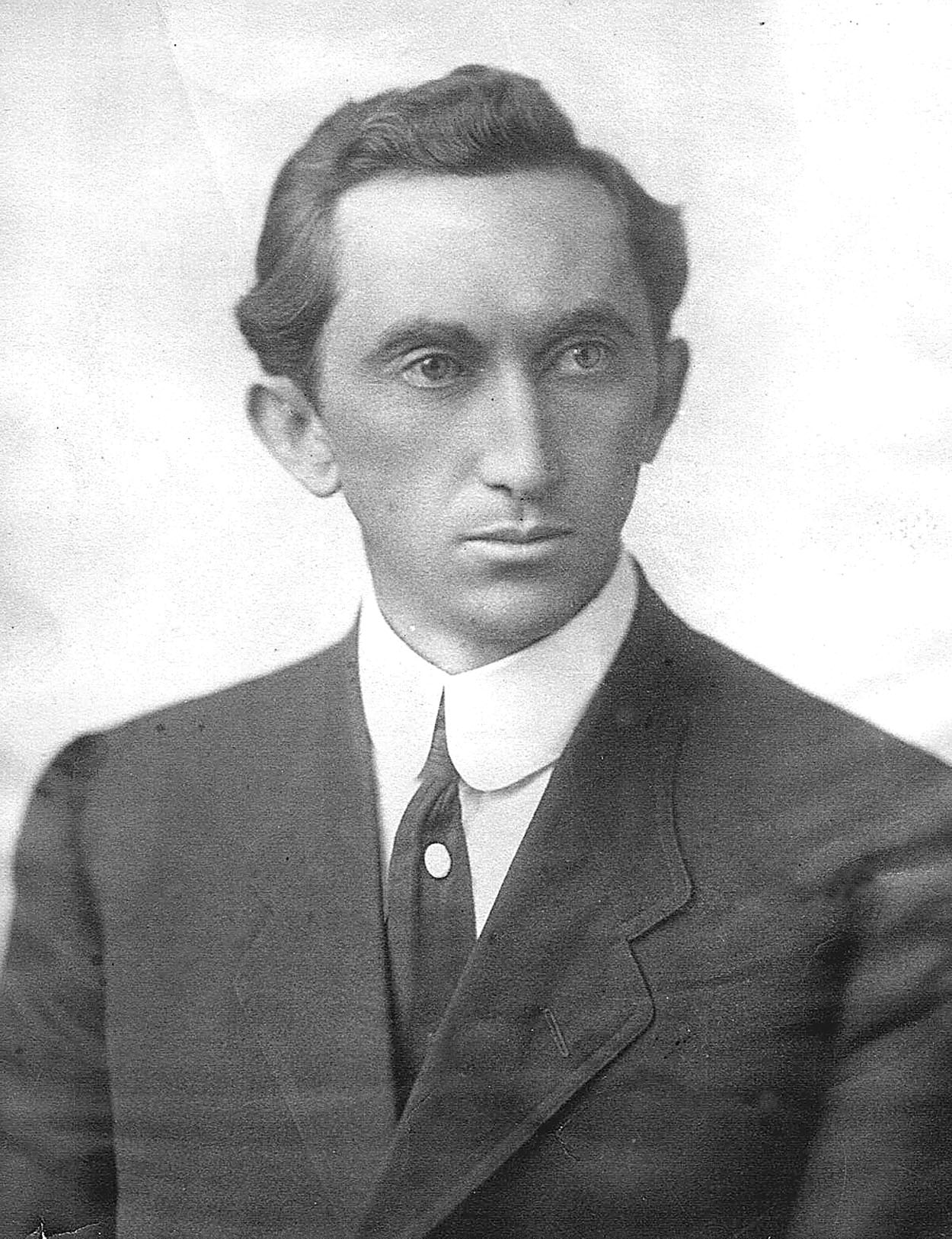

Judge of the United States District Court for the Western District of Tennessee
- In office May 31, 1921 – July 9, 1925
- Appointed by: Warren G. Harding
- Preceded by: John E. McCall
- Succeeded by: Harry B. Anderson

Personal details
- Born: John William Ross; March 9, 1878 Hardin County, Tennessee
- Died: July 9, 1925 (aged 47) Madison County, Tennessee
- Education: Cumberland School of Law (LL.B.)

John William Ross (March 9, 1878 – July 9, 1925) was a United States district judge of the United States District Court for the Western District of Tennessee.

== Education and career ==
Born on March 9, 1878, in Hardin County, Tennessee, Ross received a Bachelor of Laws from Cumberland School of Law (then part of Cumberland University, now part of Samford University) in 1900. Ross was in private practice in Savannah, Tennessee from 1900 to 1913, and was a Chancellor of the 8th Chancery District of Tennessee from 1913 to 1921.

== Federal judicial service ==
On May 26, 1921, Ross was nominated by President Warren G. Harding to a seat on the United States District Court for the Western District of Tennessee vacated by Judge John E. McCall. Ross was confirmed by the United States Senate on May 31, 1921, and received his commission the same day. Ross served in that capacity until his death on July 9, 1925.

Ross was indicted on forgery and embezzlement charges on July 8, 1925, in connection with the failure of the Peoples Saving Bank of Jackson, Tennessee. He died early the next morning when his automobile plunged off a bridge and into a creek. The coroner ruled his death an accident.

== Personal ==
With his wife Sara, Ross purchased the Ross-Sewell House in Jackson, Tennessee in 1920.

== Sources ==
Legal offices
Preceded by John E. McCall	Judge of the United States District Court for the Western District of Tennessee; 1921–1925	Succeeded by Harry B. Anderson
