= Robert Malcolm McRae Jr. =

American judge

Senior Judge of the United States District Court for the Western District of Tennessee
- In office December 31, 1986 – June 25, 2004

Chief Judge of the United States District Court for the Western District of Tennessee
- In office 1979–1986
- Preceded by: Bailey Brown
- Succeeded by: Odell Horton

Judge of the United States District Court for the Western District of Tennessee
- In office November 3, 1966 – December 31, 1986
- Appointed by: Lyndon B. Johnson
- Preceded by: Marion Speed Boyd
- Succeeded by: Jerome Turner

Personal details
- Born: Robert Malcolm McRae Jr. December 31, 1921 Memphis, Tennessee, U.S.
- Died: June 25, 2004 (aged 82)
- Education: Vanderbilt University (BA, LLB)

Robert Malcolm McRae Jr. (December 31, 1921 – June 25, 2004) was a United States district judge of the United States District Court for the Western District of Tennessee.

== Education and career ==
Born in Memphis, Tennessee, McRae received a Bachelor of Arts degree from Vanderbilt University in 1943 and was a United States Naval Reserve Lieutenant during World War II, from 1943 to 1946. He received a Bachelor of Laws from the University of Virginia School of Law in 1948. He was in private practice in Memphis from 1948 to 1964. He was an assistant city attorney of Memphis from 1961 to 1964. He was a judge of the 15th Judicial Circuit Court in Memphis from 1964 to 1966.

== Federal judicial service ==
McRae was nominated by President Lyndon B. Johnson on September 22, 1966, to a seat on the United States District Court for the Western District of Tennessee vacated by Judge Marion Speed Boyd. He was confirmed by the United States Senate on October 20, 1966, and received his commission on November 3, 1966. He served as Chief Judge from 1979 to 1986. He assumed senior status on December 31, 1986. McRae served in that capacity until his death on June 25, 2004.

== Notable case ==
One of McRae's notable cases was Northcross v. Board of Education, which implemented desegregation busing in the now defunct Memphis City Schools.

== Sources ==
Legal offices
Preceded by Marion Speed Boyd	Judge of the United States District Court for the Western District of Tennessee; 1966–1986	Succeeded by Jerome Turner
Preceded by Bailey Brown	Chief Judge of the United States District Court for the Western District of Tennessee; 19791986	Succeeded by Odell Horton
