= United States District Court for the Western District of Tennessee =

United States federal district court in Tennessee

Coordinates: 35.1498°N 90.0517°W

- (W.D. Tenn.)
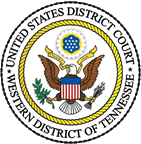

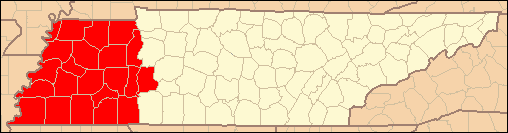
- Location: Memphis More locations: Jackson; Dyersburg
- Appeals to: Sixth Circuit
- Established: April 29, 1802
- Judges: 5
- Chief Judge: Sheryl H. Lipman

Officers of the court
- U.S. Attorney: D. Michael Dunavant
- U.S. Marshal: Tyreece L. Miller
- www.tnwd.uscourts.gov

The United States District Court for the Western District of Tennessee (in case citations, W.D. Tenn.) is the federal district court covering the western part of the state of Tennessee. Appeals from the Western District of Tennessee are taken to the United States Court of Appeals for the Sixth Circuit (except for patent claims and claims against the U.S. government under the Tucker Act, which are appealed to the Federal Circuit).

== Jurisdiction ==
The jurisdiction of the Western District of Tennessee comprises the following counties: Benton, Carroll, Chester, Crockett, Decatur, Dyer, Fayette, Gibson, Hardeman, Hardin, Haywood, Henderson, Henry, Lake, Lauderdale, Madison, McNairy, Obion, Perry, Shelby, Tipton, and Weakley.

The court's jurisdiction includes the entirety of West Tennessee, plus Perry County in Middle Tennessee. This area includes the cities of Jackson and Memphis.

The United States Attorney's Office for the Western District of Tennessee represents the United States in civil and criminal litigation in the court. As of October 20, 2025 the Office of the United States attorney is D. Michael Dunavant.

== History ==
The United States District Court for the District of Tennessee was established with one judgeship on January 31, 1797, by 1 Stat. 496. The judgeship was filled by President George Washington's appointment of John McNairy. Since Congress failed to assign the district to a circuit, the court had the jurisdiction of both a district court and a circuit court. Appeals from this one district court went directly to the United States Supreme Court.

On February 13, 1801, in the famous "Midnight Judges" Act of 1801, 2 Stat. 89, Congress abolished the U.S. district court in Tennessee, and expanded the number of circuits to six, provided for independent circuit court judgeships, and abolished the necessity of Supreme Court Justices riding the circuits. It was this legislation which created the grandfather of the present Sixth Circuit. The act provided for a "Sixth Circuit" comprising two districts in the State of Tennessee, one district in the State of Kentucky and one district, called the Ohio District, composed of the Ohio and Indiana territories (the latter including the present State of Michigan). The new Sixth Circuit Court was to be held at "Bairdstown" in the District of Kentucky, at Knoxville in the District of East Tennessee, at Nashville in the District of West Tennessee, and at Cincinnati in the District of Ohio. Unlike the other circuits which were provided with three circuit judges, the Sixth Circuit was to have only one circuit judge with district judges from Kentucky and Tennessee comprising the rest of the court. Any two judges constituted a quorum. New circuit judgeships were to be created as district judgeships in Kentucky and Tennessee became vacant.

The repeal of this Act restored the District on March 8, 1802, 2 Stat. 132. The District was divided into the Eastern and Western Districts on April 29, 1802. On February 24, 1807, Congress again abolished the two districts and created the United States Circuit for the District of Tennessee. On March 3, 1837, Congress assigned the judicial district of Tennessee to the Eighth Circuit. On June 18, 1839, by 5 Stat. 313, Congress divided Tennessee into three districts, Eastern, Middle, and Western. Again, only one judgeship was allotted for all three districts. On July 15, 1862, Congress reassigned appellate jurisdiction to the Sixth Circuit. Finally, on June 14, 1878, Congress authorized a separate judgeship for the Western District of Tennessee. President Rutherford B. Hayes then appointed Eli Shelby Hammond as the first judge for only the Western District of Tennessee.

There are now five permanent judgeships and four magistrate judgeships for the Western District of Tennessee.

== Current judges ==
As of March 2, 2026:

#	Title	Judge	Duty station	Born	Term of service			Appointed by
#	Title	Judge	Duty station	Born	Active	Chief	Senior	Appointed by
24	Chief Judge	Sheryl H. Lipman	Memphis	1963	2014–present	2023–present	—	Obama
22	District Judge	S. Thomas Anderson	Jackson	1953	2008–present	2017–2023	—	G.W. Bush
25	District Judge	Tommy Parker	Memphis	1963	2018–present	—	—	Trump
26	District Judge	Mark Norris	Memphis	1955	2018–present	—	—	Trump
27	District Judge	Brian C. Lea	Memphis	1983	2026–present	—	—	Trump
16	Senior Judge	James Dale Todd	inactive	1943	1985–2008	2001–2007	2008–present	Reagan
20	Senior Judge	Samuel H. Mays Jr.	Memphis	1948	2002–2015	—	2015–present	G.W. Bush
21	Senior Judge	J. Daniel Breen	Jackson	1950	2003–2017	2013–2017	2017–present	G.W. Bush
23	Senior Judge	John T. Fowlkes Jr.	inactive	1951	2012–2022	—	2022–present	Obama

== Former judges ==
#	Judge	Born–died	Active service	Chief Judge	Senior status	Appointed by	Reason for termination
1	John McNairy	1762–1837	1802–1833 (Note: Reassigned from the District of Tennessee. Jointly appointed to the Eastern and Western Districts of Tennessee.)	—	—	Washington/Operation of law	resignation
2	Morgan Welles Brown	1800–1853	1834–1853 (Note: Jointly appointed to the Eastern and Western Districts of Tennessee. From 1839 to 1853, Judge Brown was jointly appointed to the Middle District of Tennessee.)	—	—	Jackson	death
3	West Hughes Humphreys	1806–1882	1853–1862 (Note: Jointly appointed to the Eastern, Middle, and Western Districts of Tennessee.)	—	—	Pierce	removal
4	Connally Findlay Trigg	1810–1880	1862–1878	—	—	Lincoln	reassignment
5	Eli Shelby Hammond	1838–1904	1878–1904	—	—	Hayes	death
6	John E. McCall	1859–1920	1905–1920	—	—	T. Roosevelt	death
7	John William Ross	1878–1925	1921–1925	—	—	Harding	death
8	Harry B. Anderson	1879–1935	1925–1935 (Note: Recess appointment; formally nominated on December 8, 1925, confirmed by the United States Senate on January 29, 1926, and received commission the same day.)	—	—	Coolidge	death
9	John Donelson Martin Sr.	1883–1962	1935–1940	—	—	F. Roosevelt	elevation
10	Marion Speed Boyd	1900–1988	1940–1966	1961–1966	1966–1988	F. Roosevelt	death
11	Bailey Brown	1917–2004	1961–1979	1966–1979	—	Kennedy	elevation
12	Robert Malcolm McRae Jr.	1921–2004	1966–1986	1979–1986	1986–2004	L. Johnson	death
13	Harry W. Wellford	1924–2021	1970–1982	—	—	Nixon	elevation
14	Odell Horton	1929–2006	1980–1995	1987–1994	1995–2006	Carter	death
15	Julia Smith Gibbons	1950–present	1983–2002	1994–2000	—	Reagan	elevation
17	Jerome Turner	1942–2000	1987–2000	—	—	Reagan	death
18	Jon Phipps McCalla	1947–2026	1992–2013	2008–2013	2013–2026	G.H.W. Bush	death
19	Bernice B. Donald	1951–present	1995–2011	—	—	Clinton	elevation

== Chief judges ==
Chief judges have administrative responsibilities with respect to their district court. Unlike the Supreme Court, where one justice is specifically nominated to be chief, the office of chief judge rotates among the district court judges. To be chief, a judge must have been in active service on the court for at least one year, be under the age of 65, and have not previously served as chief judge.

A vacancy is filled by the judge highest in seniority among the group of qualified judges. The chief judge serves for a term of seven years, or until age 70, whichever occurs first. The age restrictions are waived if no members of the court would otherwise be qualified for the position.

When the office was created in 1948, the chief judge was the longest-serving judge who had not elected to retire, on what has since 1958 been known as senior status, or declined to serve as chief judge. After August 6, 1959, judges could not become or remain chief after turning 70 years old. The current rules have been in operation since October 1, 1982.

== Succession of seats ==
Seat 1
Seat reassigned from District of Tennessee on April 29, 1802 by 2 Stat. 165 (concurrent with Eastern District)
McNairy	1802–1833
Seat made concurrent with Middle District on June 18, 1839 by 5 Stat. 313
Brown	1833–1853
Humphreys	1853–1862
Trigg	1862–1878
Seat reassigned solely to Eastern and Middle Districts on June 14, 1878 by 20 Stat. 132

Seat 2
Seat established on June 14, 1878 by 20 Stat. 132
Hammond	1878–1904
McCall	1905–1920
Ross	1921–1925
H. Anderson	1926–1935
Martin, Sr.	1935–1940
Boyd	1940–1966
McRae, Jr.	1966–1986
Turner	1987–2000
Mays, Jr.	2002–2015
Parker	2018–present

Seat 3
Seat established on May 19, 1961 by 75 Stat. 80
Brown	1961–1979
Horton	1980–1995
Donald	1995–2011
Fowlkes, Jr.	2012–2022
Lea	2026–present

Seat 4
Seat established on June 2, 1970 by 84 Stat. 294
Wellford	1970–1982
Gibbons	1983–2002
Breen	2003–2017
Norris, Sr.	2018–present

Seat 5
Seat established on July 10, 1984 by 98 Stat. 333
Todd	1985–2008
S. Anderson	2008–present

Seat 6
Seat established on December 1, 1990 by 104 Stat. 5089
McCalla	1992–2013
Lipman	2014–present

== Courthouses ==
The U.S. District Court for the Western District of Tennessee is based out of two courthouses, the Odell Horton Federal Building on 167 North Main Street in downtown Memphis and the Ed Jones Federal Building in Jackson, Tennessee.

== List of U.S. attorneys ==
- Thomas Stuart 1803–1810
- John E. Beck 1810–1818
- Henry Crabb 1818–1827
- Thomas H. Fletcher 1827–1829
- James Collinsworth 1829–1835
- William T. Brown 1835–1836
- James P. Grundy 1836–1838
- Joseph H. Talbot 1838-1838
- Henry W. McCorry 1838–1850
- Charles N. Gibbs 1850–1853
- Richard J. Hays 1853–1856
- Alexander W. McCampbell 1856–1861
- John M. McCarmack 1861–1877
- W.W. Murray 1877–1882
- William F. Poston 1882–1885
- Henry W. McCorry 1885–1889
- Samuel W. Hawkins 1889–1894
- Julius A. Taylor 1894–1895
- Charles B. Simonton 1895–1898
- George Randolph 1898–1910
- Casey Todd 1910–1914
- Hubert F. Fisher 1914–1917
- William D. Kyser 1917–1921
- S.E. Murray 1921–1926
- Tilmon A. Lancaster 1926–1926
- Nugent Dodds 1926–1926
- Lindsay B. Phillips 1926–1931
- Nelson H. Carver 1931–1932
- Dwayne D. Maddox 1932–1933
- William McClanahan 1933–1948
- John Brown 1948–1953
- Milsaps Fitzhugh 1953–1960
- Warner Hodges 1960–1961
- Thomas L. Robinson 1961–1969
- Thomas F. Turley, Jr. 1969–1977
- W.J. Michael Cody 1977–1981
- Hickman Ewing 1981–1991
- Ed Bryant 1991–1993
- Daniel A. Clancy 1993
- Veronica F. Coleman 1993–2001
- Lawrence J. Laurenzi 2001-2001
- Terrell L. Harris 2001–2005
- Lawrence J. Laurenzi 2005–2006
- David Kustoff 2006–2008
- Lawrence J. Laurenzi 2008–2010
- Edward L. Stanton III 2010–2017
- Lawrence J. Laurenzi 2017
- D. Michael Dunavant 2017–2021
- Joseph C. Murphy Jr. 2021–2022 (acting)
- Kevin G. Ritz 2022–2024
- Reagan T. Fondren (acting) 2024–2025
- D. Michael Dunavant 2025–

== See also ==
- Courts of Tennessee
- List of current United States district judges
- List of United States federal courthouses in Tennessee
