= Jane Branstetter Stranch =

American judge (born 1953)

Jane Stranch
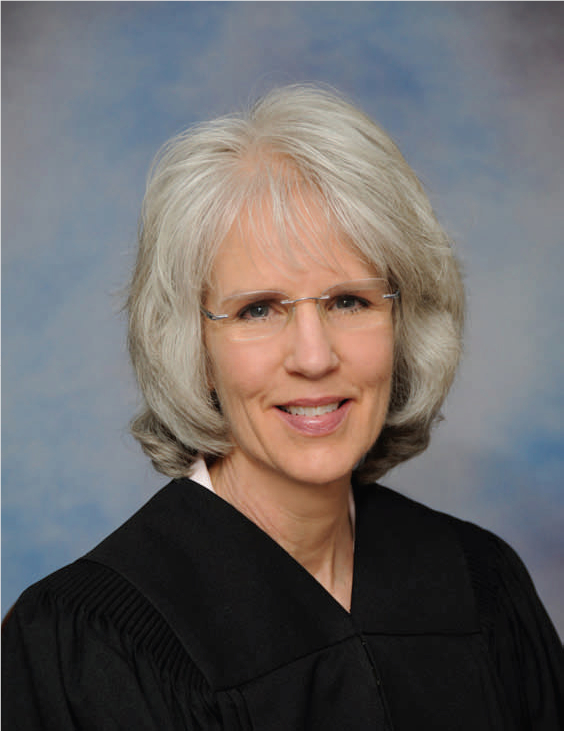

Senior Judge of the United States Court of Appeals for the Sixth Circuit
- Incumbent
- Assumed office July 14, 2025

Judge of the United States Court of Appeals for the Sixth Circuit
- In office September 15, 2010 – July 14, 2025
- Appointed by: Barack Obama
- Preceded by: Martha Craig Daughtrey
- Succeeded by: Whitney Hermandorfer

Personal details
- Born: Kathy Jane Branstetter; September 17, 1953 (age 72); Nashville, Tennessee, U.S.
- Education: University of Tennessee (attended); Vanderbilt University (BA, JD)

Kathy Jane Branstetter Stranch (born September 17, 1953) is a senior United States circuit judge of the United States Court of Appeals for the Sixth Circuit.

== Early life and education ==
Born Kathy Jane Branstetter in Nashville, Tennessee, Stranch first attended the University of Virginia from 1971 to 1972 and then the University of Tennessee from 1972 to 1973 and earned no degree. In 1973, Stranch enrolled at Vanderbilt University earning a Bachelor of Arts degree, summa cum laude, in 1975. She then earned a Juris Doctor from Vanderbilt University Law School in 1978, where she was elected to the Order of the Coif.

== Professional career ==
Stranch started her professional career at the law firm of Branstetter, Stranch & Jennings, PLLC as a law clerk working summers and part-time 1975 through the summer of 1978. Following the bar exam, Stranch was promoted to an associate in 1978 and became a partner in 1994. From 1981 through 1983 Stranch, taught a general introductory course in labor law at Belmont University. Early in her career Stranch practiced law in both the state and federal courts with a focus in labor employment, Employee Retirement Income Security Act of 1974 (ERISA), personal injury, worker's compensation, wrongful death, and utility law. During the latter part of the 1990s, Stranch's practice was mainly complex litigation and class action work throughout the United States. Many of her cases involved representation of plan participants who had lost their individual account pensions due to fiduciary breaches, often concurrent with corporate scandals. Stranch litigated approximately 85% of her cases before the federal courts and 15% in state courts and other administrative agencies. The vast majority (95%) were in civil proceedings.

== Federal judicial service ==
On August 6, 2009, President Barack Obama announced that he had nominated Stranch to a vacancy on the United States Court of Appeals for the Sixth Circuit, to the seat vacated by Judge Martha Craig Daughtrey, who assumed senior status on January 1, 2009. Stranch was one of several candidates whom NashvillePost.com had reported in April 2009 was being considered for the seat, along with United States District Judge William Joseph Haynes Jr., United States District Judge Bernice B. Donald, Nashville criminal defense attorney David Raybin and Vanderbilt University Law School Professor Lisa Schultz Bressman. In addition, in the February 8, 2009 Nashville Tennessean, Stranch was interviewed by the newspaper about her interest in the vacancy, and she told The Tennessean that "I think there's value in a judge having a great deal of federal experience, but also one who's litigated. I would hope to bring to the bench a fair temperament but also an understanding of what it means to be a litigator in the courts." After a more than one-year wait, the United States Senate confirmed Stranch on September 13, 2010, by a 71–21 vote. She waited longer than any other Obama nominee to receive a confirmation vote by the Senate. She received her commission on September 15, 2010. On January 29, 2024, she announced her intent to assume senior status upon confirmation of a successor, and later assumed senior status on July 14, 2025.

== Notable opinions ==
In United States v. Edward L. Young, the Sixth Circuit considered whether a mandatory 15-year sentence, as required under the Armed Career Criminal Act (ACCA) constituted cruel and unusual punishment for a convicted felon who possessed seven shotgun shells. Young's prior felony offenses, for burglary, had occurred roughly twenty years before he was found with the shells. On September 11, 2014, a three-judge panel, including Judge Stranch, upheld the sentence. But Judge Stranch wrote a concurrence to express her view on mandatory minimum sentencing: "I therefore join the continuous flood of voices expressing concern that the ACCA and other mandatory minimum laws are ineffective in achieving their purpose and damaging to our federal criminal justice system and our nation. I commend this case as another example of the need to reconsider the ACCA and mandatory sentencing in general."

On December 17, 2021, Stranch wrote the majority opinion in a 2–1 decision upholding a Biden administration requirement that all federal employees and contractors be vaccinated from COVID-19, and corporations with over 100 employees be either vaccinated or tested weekly.

== Personal ==
Stranch's husband, James G. Stranch III, is a Nashville attorney who is a partner in the law firm of Branstetter, Stranch & Jennings. They have four children, two of whom also practice at the firm.

Legal offices
Preceded by Martha Craig Daughtrey	Judge of the United States Court of Appeals for the Sixth Circuit; 2010–2025	Succeeded by Whitney Hermandorfer
