= Stanley W. Merrell =

American judge

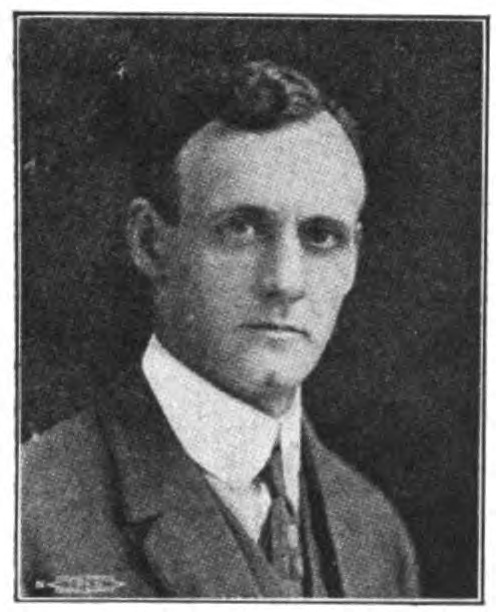
- circa 1914

Associate Justice of the Ohio Supreme Court
- In office December 2, 1919 – June 18, 1920
- Appointed by: James M. Cox
- Preceded by: Maurice H. Donahue
- Succeeded by: Coleman W. Avery

Personal details
- Born: December 26, 1876 Price Hill, Cincinnati, Ohio
- Died: February 14, 1921 (aged 44) Hyde Park, Cincinnati, Ohio
- Resting place: Spring Grove Cemetery
- Party: Democratic
- Spouse: Mary Louise Caldwell
- Children: two
- Education: Harvard University; Harvard Law School

Stanley W. Merrell (December 26, 1876 – February 14, 1921) was a lawyer from a prominent Cincinnati family in the U.S. State of Ohio. He was a local judge and prosecutor, and was appointed a justice of the Ohio Supreme Court in 1919.

== Biography ==
Stanley W. Merrell was born on Mt. Hope Road, Price Hill, Cincinnati, Ohio, December 26, 1876. He was the son of George and Cornelia Spear Merrell, and grandson of William Stanley Merrell, founder of the William S. Merrell Company. William Stanley Merrell was the "first educated chemist to take up residence west of the Allegheny Mountains", discovered and introduced podophyllin, and his company was one of the largest pharmaceutical manufacturers of its time. George Merrell was president of the company and president of the board of directors of the Cincinnati College of Pharmacy.

Stanley W. Merrell attended Hughes High School for two years before graduating from the private Franklin School. He graduated B.A. from Harvard University in 1899 and LL.B. from Harvard Law School in 1901. He returned to Cincinnati in the fall of 1901, passed the bar exam, and started a partnership with Bentley Matthews, a brother of Stanley Matthews of the United States Supreme Court, which would last until 1908, when Merrell went into practice alone.

== Public Service ==
Merrell was elected a member-at-large of the Cincinnati City Council 1906 to 1908. He was the only Democrat on the council. He was assistant county prosecutor for Hamilton County, Ohio 1909 to 1911, and was appointed assistant city solicitor in 1912. He resigned when Governor James M. Cox appointed him a judge on the Cincinnati Superior Court on September 1, 1913. He was elected to a full six year term, (1/1/1914-12/31/1919), in November of that year.

One month before the expiration of his term in Cincinnati, Merrell was appointed by Governor Cox to the Ohio Supreme Court on December 2, 1919, to a seat vacated by Maurice H. Donahue, who had been appointed to the United States Court of Appeals for the Sixth Circuit. He served only six months before resigning June 18, 1920, to accept the job of general counsel for the Big Four Railroad, with offices in Cincinnati. He also became a professor at the Cincinnati Law School.

On February 11, 1921, Merrell became ill at his Big Four office in Cincinnati, and he died February 14, 1921, at his Hyde Park, Cincinnati home. Funeral services were at his home, and he was buried at Spring Grove Cemetery.

Stanley W. Merrell was married April, 1905 to Mary Louise Caldwell of Cincinnati. They had daughters named Alice and Mina Louise.

Merrell was associated fraternally with the Avon Lodge of A. F. and A. M.
