= John K. Richards =

American judge (1856–1909)

John Kelvey Richards
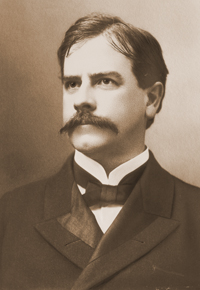

Judge of the United States Court of Appeals for the Sixth Circuit
- In office February 23, 1903 – March 1, 1909
- Appointed by: Theodore Roosevelt
- Preceded by: William R. Day
- Succeeded by: John Wesley Warrington

10th Solicitor General of the United States
- In office July 1, 1897 – March 16, 1903
- Appointed by: William McKinley
- Preceded by: Holmes Conrad
- Succeeded by: Henry M. Hoyt

20th Attorney General of Ohio
- In office January 11, 1892 – January 13, 1896
- Governor: William McKinley
- Preceded by: David K. Watson
- Succeeded by: Frank S. Monnett

Member of the Ohio Senate from the 8th district
- In office January 6, 1890 – January 3, 1892 Serving with J. L. Carpenter
- Preceded by: William J. Rannells
- Succeeded by: J. L. Carpenter

Personal details
- Born: John Kelvey Richards; March 15, 1856 Ironton, Ohio, US
- Died: March 1, 1909 (aged 52) Cincinnati, Ohio, US
- Education: Swarthmore College (AB); Harvard University (AB) read law

John Kelvey Richards (March 15, 1856 – March 1, 1909) was the 20th Attorney General of Ohio, the 10th Solicitor General of the United States and a United States circuit judge of the United States Court of Appeals for the Sixth Circuit and of the United States Circuit Courts for the Sixth Circuit.

== Education and career ==
Born on March 15, 1856, in Ironton, Lawrence County, Ohio, Richards was the son of Samuel and Sarah (Kelvey) Richards. Having received his early education in the schools of his native town, Richards received an Artium Baccalaureus degree in 1875 from Swarthmore College, an Artium Baccalaureus degree in 1877 from Harvard University and read law in 1879, in the office of Judge William Wartenbee Johnson, later Chief Justice of the Supreme Court of Ohio. He was a prosecutor for Lawrence County from 1880 to 1882. He was city solicitor for Ironton from 1885 to 1889. He was a member of the Ohio Senate from 1890 to 1892, serving as Chairman of the Judiciary Committee. He was the 20th Attorney General of Ohio from 1892 to 1896, his term running currently with that of Governor of Ohio William McKinley. He was a member of the Commission to Codify Insurance Laws of Ohio from 1895 to 1896. He was counsel for the Commission on Taxation of the Ohio General Assembly in 1896. He was general counsel for the Ohio State Board of Medical Registration and Examination from 1896 to 1898. He was special counsel for the Ohio State Board of Appraisers and Assessors from 1896 to 1898. He was the 10th Solicitor General of the United States from July 1, 1897 to March 16, 1903.

=== Notable cases as Ohio Attorney General ===
While serving as the Ohio Attorney General, Richards successfully fought through the courts the claim of the state that though it had granted the canal beds to these cities for streets and sewage purposes, the cities had no right to turn them over to the railroads and that the railroads must surrender their use to the state. The tax bills which he as counsel for the legislative committee helped to draft, he was called upon to uphold in state courts and in the United States Supreme Court. His successful defense of these bills, which taxed the franchises of foreign corporations, the property of interstate express companies by the "unit" rule, and the proportionate share of cars of sleeping car companies, gave rise to decisions which became the basis for much important excise and property-tax law.

=== Notable cases as Solicitor General ===
As Solicitor General, Richards was called upon to handle the difficult legal questions arising out of the Spanish–American War, particularly in reference to the territory acquired by the United States. A number of the Insular Cases were argued by him in the Supreme Court, as were also the Joint Traffic Association and the Addyston Pipe & Steel Company cases. He prepared the briefs and handled the Northern Securities case until his appointment to the bench in 1903.

== Federal judicial service ==
Richards was nominated by President Theodore Roosevelt on February 19, 1903, to a joint seat on the United States Court of Appeals for the Sixth Circuit and the United States Circuit Courts for the Sixth Circuit vacated by Judge William Rufus Day. He was confirmed by the United States Senate on February 23, 1903, and received his commission the same day. His service terminated on March 1, 1909, due to his death in Cincinnati, Ohio.

=== Judicial opinions ===
During his time on the federal bench, Richards wrote over 140 opinions, few being over three pages long, and many only one or two.

== Personal ==
On June 12, 1890, Richards married Anna Willard Steece of Ironton, Ohio, who with one daughter and two sons survived him.

== Sources ==
Legal offices
| Preceded by David K. Watson | 20th Attorney General of Ohio; 1892–1896 | Succeeded by Frank S. Monnett |
| Preceded by Holmes Conrad | 10th Solicitor General of the United States; 1897–1903 | Succeeded by Henry M. Hoyt |
| Preceded by William R. Day | Judge of the United States Circuit Courts for the Sixth Circuit; 1903–1909 | Succeeded by John Wesley Warrington |
| Preceded by William R. Day | Judge of the United States Court of Appeals for the Sixth Circuit; 1903–1909 | Succeeded by John Wesley Warrington |
