= 110th Ohio Volunteer Infantry =

- Active: October 3, 1862, to June 25, 1865
- Country: United States
- Allegiance: Union
- Branch: Infantry
- Engagements: Second Battle of Winchester; New York Draft Riots; Bristoe Campaign; Mine Run Campaign; Battle of the Wilderness; Battle of Spotsylvania Court House; Battle of Cold Harbor; Battle of Monocacy; Shenandoah Valley Campaign; Third Battle of Winchester; Battle of Cedar Creek; Siege of Petersburg

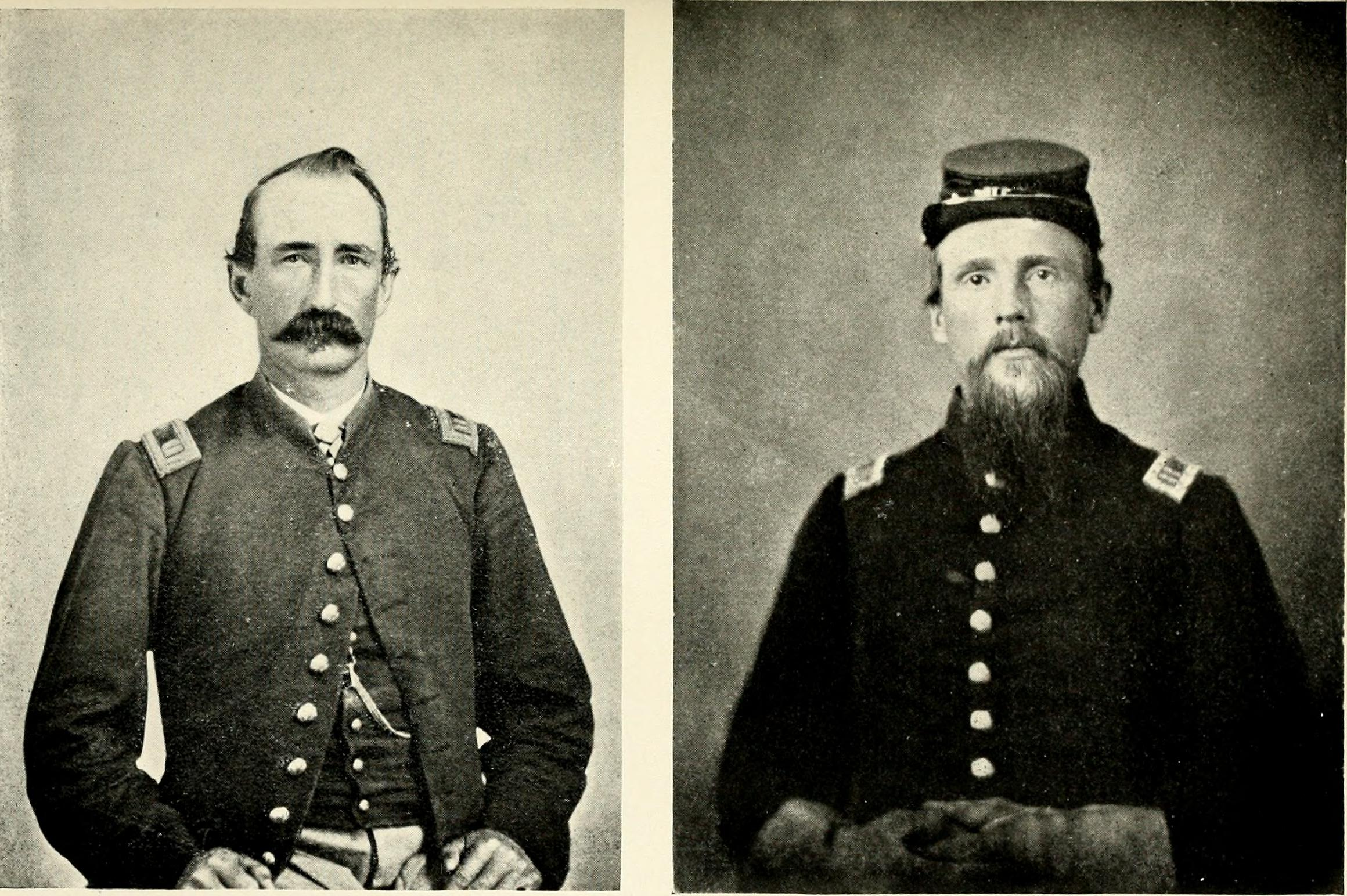
Two officers of the Ohio 110th Volunteer Infantry, Major William S. McElwain and Brevet Lieutenant-Colonel Aaron Spangler

The 110th Ohio Volunteer Infantry (or 110th OVI) was an infantry regiment in the Union Army during the American Civil War.

== Service ==
The 110th Ohio Infantry was organized at Camp Piqua in Piqua, Ohio, and mustered in for three years service on October 3, 1862, under the command of Colonel Joseph Warren Keifer.

The regiment was attached to Railroad Division, Clarksburg, Western Virginia, Middle Department, to January 1863. Milroy's Command, Winchester, Va., VIII Corps, Middle Department, to March 1863. 1st Brigade, 2nd Division, VIII Corps, Middle Department, to June 1863. 1st Brigade, Elliott's Command, VIII Corps, to July 1863. 2nd Brigade, 3rd Division, III Corps, Army of the Potomac, to March 1864. 2nd Brigade, 3rd Division, VI Corps, Army of the Potomac and Army of the Shenandoah, Middle Military Division, to June 1865.

The 110th Ohio Infantry mustered out of service at Washington, D.C. on June 25, 1865.

== Detailed service ==
Moved to Zanesville, Ohio, October 19; thence to Parkersburg, Va. Moved to Clarksburg, Va., November 3, 1862; thence moved to New Creek November 25, and to Moorefield December 13. Expedition to Winchester December 28, 1862, to January 1, 1863, and duty there until June. Reconnaissance toward Wardensville and Strasburg April 20. Battle of Winchester June 13–15. Retreat to Harper's Ferry June 15–16, thence to Washington, D.C., July 1–4. Moved to Frederick City, Md., and joined Army of the Potomac July 5. Pursuit of Lee to Manassas Gap, Va., July 5–24. Wapping Heights July 23. Duty on line of the Rappahannock until August 15, and at New York during draft disturbances August 16-September 6. Bristoe Campaign October 9–22. Advance to line of the Rappahannock November 7–8. Kelly's Ford November 7. Mine Run Campaign November 26-December 2. Payne's Farm November 27. Demonstration on the Rapidan February 6–7, 1864. Campaign from the Rapidan to the James River May 3-June 15. Battles of the Wilderness May 5–7; Spotsylvania May 8–12; Spotsylvania Court House May 12–21. Assault on the Salient, "Bloody Angle," May 12. North Anna River May 23–26. On line of the Pamunkey May 26–28. Totopotomoy May 28–31. Cold Harbor June 1–12. Before Petersburg June 18-July 6. Jerusalem Plank Road June 22–23. Moved to Baltimore, Md., July 6–8. Battle of Monocacy Junction, Md., July 9. Sheridan's Shenandoah Valley Campaign August 7-November 28. Charlestown August 29. Battle of Opequon (also called Third Battle of Winchester), September 19. Fisher's Hill September 22. Battle of Cedar Creek October 19. Duty at Kernstown until December. Moved to Washington, D. C, thence to Petersburg, Va., December 3–6. Siege of Petersburg December 6, 1864, to April 2, 1865. Appomattox Campaign March 28-April 9, 1865. Fall of Petersburg April 2. Pursuit of Lee April 3–9. Saylor's Creek April 6. Appomattox Court House April 9. Surrender of Lee and his army. March to Danville, Va., April 17–27, and duty there until May. Moved to Richmond, Va., May 16; thence to Washington, D.C., May 24-June 2. Corps Review June 9.

== Casualties ==
The regiment lost a total of 230 men during service; 10 officers and 107 enlisted men killed or mortally wounded, 2 officers and 111 enlisted men died of disease.

== Commanders ==
- Colonel Joseph Warren Keifer - Brevet Brigadier General, October 19, 1864; Brevet Major General, April 11, 1865; mustered out with regiment, June 27, 1865
- Lieutenant Colonel Otto H. Brinkley - commanded at the Battle of Monocacy
- Lieutenant Colonel William N. Foster - commanded at the Battle of Opequan

== Notable members ==
- Private Isaac James, Company H - Medal of Honor recipient for action at Petersburg
- Colonel J. Warren Keifer - 34th Speaker of the United States House of Representatives, 1881–1883 and member of the U.S. House of Representatives from Ohio, 1877–1885 and 1905-1911
- Sergeant Francis M. McMillen, Company C - Medal of Honor recipient for action at Petersburg
- John Wesley Warrington - judge of the U.S. Court of Appeals for the 6th Circuit, 1909–1919

== See also ==
- List of Ohio Civil War units
- Ohio in the Civil War
