= Church Hill, Alabama =

- Unincorporated community
- Location within Alabama Location within the United States
- Coordinates: 32°38′54″N 85°44′53″W
- Country: United States
- State: Alabama
- County: Tallapoosa
- Elevation: 597 ft (182 m)
- Time zone: UTC-6 (Central (CST))
  - Summer (DST): UTC-5 (CDT)
- Area codes: 256 & 938
- GNIS feature ID: 137384

Church Hill is an unincorporated community in Tallapoosa County, Alabama, United States. Church Hill is the birthplace of Herschel W. Arant, a legal academic and jurist who served on the United States Court of Appeals for the Sixth Circuit from 1939 to 1941. A post office was operated in Church Hill from 1888 to 1904.
