= Whitney Hermandorfer =

American judge (born 1987)

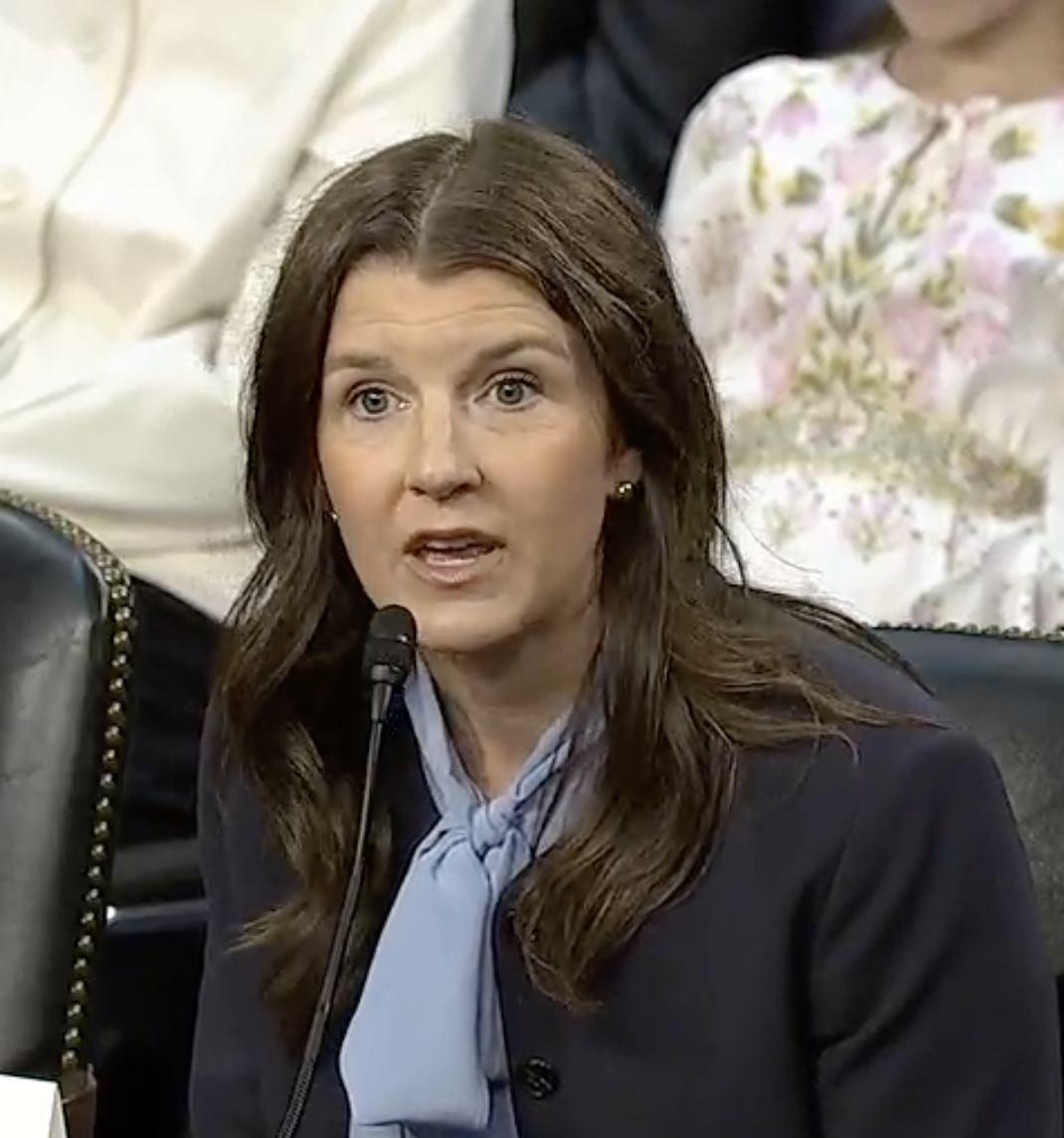

Judge of the United States Court of Appeals for the Sixth Circuit
- Incumbent
- Assumed office July 17, 2025
- Appointed by: Donald Trump
- Preceded by: Jane Branstetter Stranch

Personal details
- Born: Whitney Dianne Downs; 1987 (age 38–39) Clearwater, Florida, U.S.
- Education: Princeton University (AB); George Washington University (JD)

Whitney Downs Hermandorfer (née Downs; born 1987) is an American lawyer who is serving as a United States circuit judge of the United States Court of Appeals for the Sixth Circuit. She previously was the director of the Strategic Litigation Unit in the Tennessee Attorney General's office from 2023 to 2025.

== Early life and education ==
Hermandorfer was born Whitney Dianne Downs in 1987 in Clearwater, Florida. She graduated from Princeton University with an Artium Baccalaureus degree and with a minor in sociology magna cum laude in 2009. She received her Juris Doctor from George Washington University Law School in 2015 and was editor-in-chief of The George Washington Law Review. In law school, she won the John Bell Larner Award for achieving the highest cumulative grade point average.

== Career ==
In 2015, Hermandorfer joined the law firm of Williams and Connolly in Washington D.C. as an associate, where she focused on appellate and administrative law. Hermandorfer was a law clerk for then-Judge Brett Kavanaugh from 2016 to 2017 while he served on the United States Court of Appeals for the District of Columbia Circuit, as well as for Judge Richard Leon on the United States District Court for the District of Columbia from 2017 to 2018. She later clerked for Associate Justices Samuel Alito (2018–19) and Amy Coney Barrett (2020–21) on the United States Supreme Court. She returned to Williams and Connolly in 2021 and then in 2023 joined the Tennessee Attorney General's office as director of the newly formed Strategic Litigation Unit under attorney general Jonathan Skrmetti

Hermandorfer is a member of the Federalist Society.

=== Federal judicial service ===
On May 2, 2025, President Donald Trump announced his intent to nominate Hermandorfer to serve on the United States Court of Appeals for the Sixth Circuit , to fill the seat of Judge Jane Branstetter Stranch, who had announced her intention to assume senior status upon the confirmation of a successor. Hermandorfer was Trump's first judicial nominee of the second term.

Her nomination was sent to the Senate on May 12, 2025. On June 26, 2025, the Senate Judiciary Committee advanced it by a party-line 12–10 vote. The United States Senate invoked cloture on July, 10, 2025, by a 51–43 vote and confirmed Hermandorfer on July 14, 2025 by a 46–42 vote. She received her judicial commission on July 17, 2025.

== See also ==
- List of law clerks for the sixth seat of the Supreme Court of the United States
- List of law clerks for the eighth seat of the Supreme Court of the United States

Legal offices
Preceded by Jane Branstetter Stranch	Judge of the United States Court of Appeals for the Sixth Circuit; 2025–present	Incumbent
