= Maurice Donahue =

Maurice Donahue may refer to:

- Maurice H. Donahue (1864–1928), United States federal judge
- Maurice A. Donahue (1918–1999), American politician in Massachusetts
