= Mushroom House (Cincinnati) =

House in Cincinnati, Ohio

Coordinates: 39.141219°N 84.423718°W

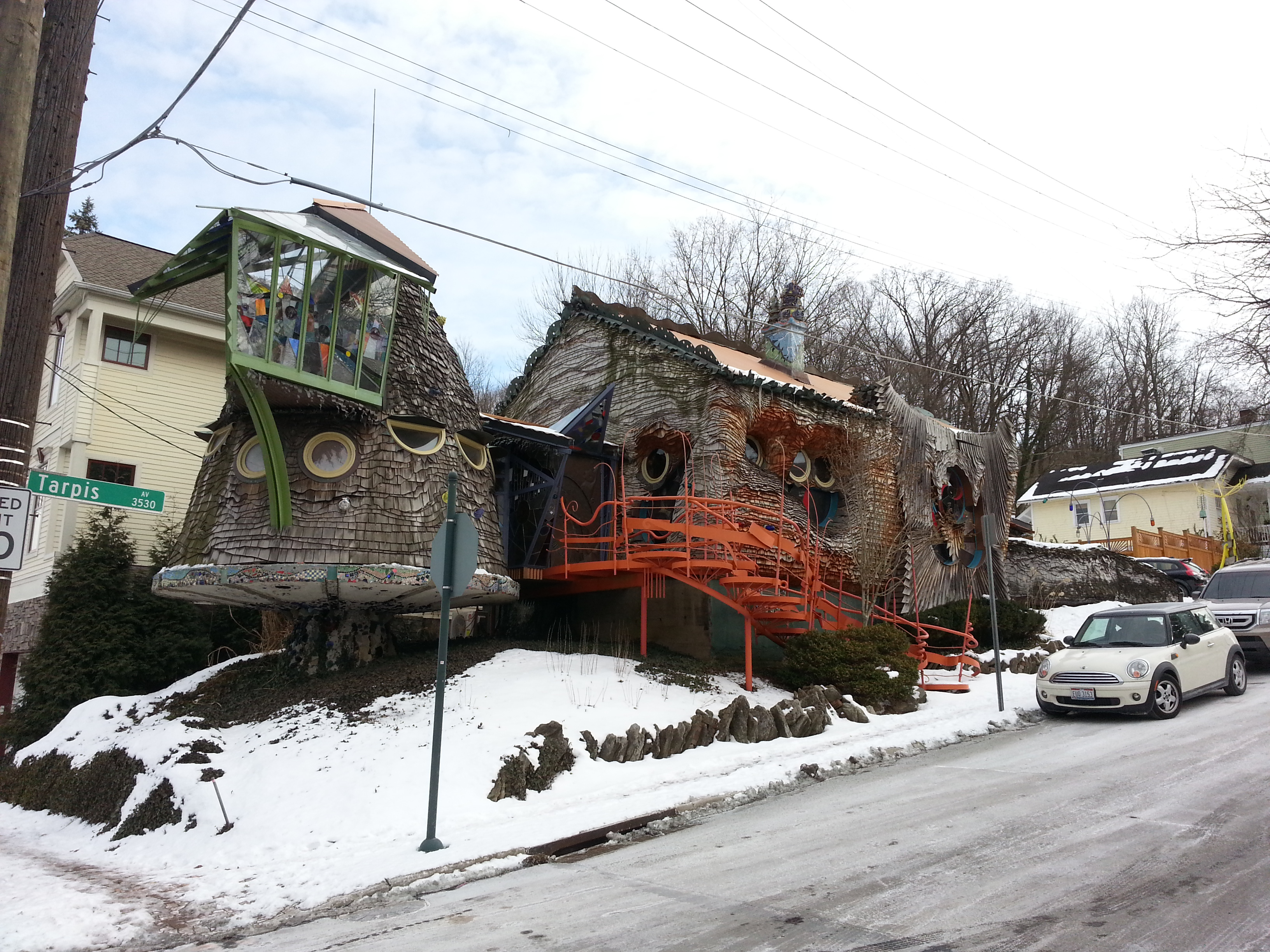
- Interactive map of the Mushroom House area

General information
- Location: 3331 Erie Avenue; Cincinnati, Ohio
- Construction started: 1992
- Completed: 2006

Design and construction
- Architect: Terry Brown

The Studio (also known as the Mushroom House) is an ornately fanciful home built by architect Terry Brown in the Hyde Park neighborhood of Cincinnati, Ohio. The one-bedroom house features a cone shaped addition and a spiral staircase entry.

It was built between 1992 and 2006. The structure as it is currently was completed in 2016. The Studio served as the architect's office and secondary residence until his death in 2008.
