= George Clifton Edwards Jr. =

American judge (1914–1995)

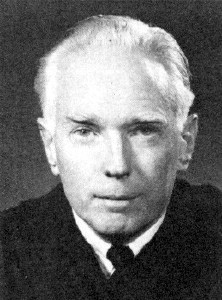
- Edwards circa 1970

Senior Judge of the United States Court of Appeals for the Sixth Circuit
- In office January 15, 1985 – April 8, 1995

Chief Judge of the United States Court of Appeals for the Sixth Circuit
- In office January 14, 1979 – October 1, 1983
- Preceded by: Harry Phillips
- Succeeded by: Pierce Lively

Judge of the United States Court of Appeals for the Sixth Circuit
- In office December 19, 1963 – January 15, 1985
- Nominated by: John F. Kennedy
- Appointed by: Lyndon B. Johnson
- Preceded by: Thomas Francis McAllister
- Succeeded by: James L. Ryan

Commissioner of the Detroit Police Department
- In office January 2, 1962 – December 19, 1963
- Mayor: Jerome Cavanaugh
- Preceded by: Herbert W. Hart
- Succeeded by: Ray Girardin

Justice of the Michigan Supreme Court
- In office 1956–1962

Judge of the Wayne County Circuit Court
- In office 1951–1956

Probate Judge of the Wayne County Juvenile Court
- In office 1951–1956
- Appointed by: G. Mennen Williams

Chairman of the Detroit Election Commission
- In office 1946–1950

President of the Detroit Common Council
- In office 1946–1950

Member of the Detroit Common Council
- In office 1941–1950

Director–Secretary of the Detroit Housing Commission
- In office 1939–1941
- Appointed by: Edward Jeffries

Personal details
- Born: George Clifton Edwards Jr. August 6, 1914 Dallas, Texas, U.S.
- Died: April 8, 1995 (aged 80) Cincinnati, Ohio, U.S.
- Education: Southern Methodist University (BA); Harvard University (MA); Detroit College of Law (JD)

George Clifton Edwards Jr. (August 6, 1914 – April 8, 1995) was a justice of the Michigan Supreme Court and a United States circuit judge of the United States Court of Appeals for the Sixth Circuit. He also served as commissioner of the Detroit Police Department, a probate judge of the juvenile court of Wayne County, a judge of the Wayne County circuit court, chairman of the Detroit Election Commission, president of the Detroit Common Council (city council), and director–secretary of the Detroit Housing Commission.

== Education and early career ==
Born in Dallas, Texas, Edwards received a Bachelor of Arts degree from Southern Methodist University in 1933 and a Master of Arts from Harvard University in 1934. Edwards moved to Detroit, Michigan, in 1936 and became a United Automobile Workers union organizer. In 1939, Edwards was appointed director-secretary of the Detroit Housing Commission by Mayor Edward Jeffries. He was elected to the Detroit Common Council in 1941 at the age of 25. He was in the United States Army during World War II, from 1943 to 1946, primarily stationed in the Philippines, where he became a 2nd Lieutenant.

Edwards received a Certificate of Completion from Detroit College of Law (now Michigan State University College of Law) in 1944, and a Juris Doctor from the same institution in 1949. Upon return from army duty, Edwards began his law practice and also returned to the common council and was elected president of the council that year. In 1949, Edwards ran for Mayor of Detroit but lost to Albert Cobo in a racially charged election in which Edwards stood up for equal rights for blacks and the protection of individual civil rights. Edwards continued serving as President of the Detroit Common Council from 1946 to 1950, and was also Chairman of the Detroit Election Commission from 1946 to 1950.

== State judicial service (1951—1962) ==
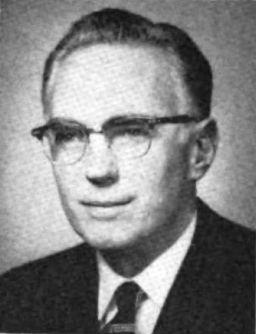
Edwards, circa 1961

In 1951, Governor G. Mennen Williams appointed Edwards as probate judge of the Wayne County Juvenile Court. In 1954, he was elected to the Wayne County Circuit Court. In 1956, he was appointed to the Michigan Supreme Court to fill a vacancy, and was subsequently elected to this court for two more terms, serving until 1961.

== Detroit Police Commissioner (1962–1963) ==
Edwards resigned from the Michigan Supreme Court in 1962 when he was appointed Detroit Police commissioner by Mayor Jerome Cavanagh, in hopes that he could help ease the racial troubles in the city.

== Federal judicial service ==
On September 9, 1963, Edwards was nominated by President John F. Kennedy to a seat on the United States Court of Appeals for the Sixth Circuit vacated by Judge Thomas Francis McAllister. His confirmation hearing in the United States Senate commenced the day before President Kennedy was assassinated. Edwards was confirmed on December 16, 1963, over the objections of the Director of the Federal Bureau of Investigation, J. Edgar Hoover. Edwards received his commission on December 19, 1963, from President Lyndon B. Johnson. He served as Chief Judge from January 16, 1979, to September 30, 1983, assuming senior status on January 15, 1985. Edwards served in that capacity until his death on April 8, 1995, in Cincinnati, Ohio.

== Writing credits ==
Edwards wrote Pioneer at Law: A Legacy in Pursuit of Justice, a biography of his father, George C. Edwards, a lawyer and activist on behalf of labor unions, the poor, and African Americans, in Dallas, Texas, during the first half of the 20th century, and an autobiographical account of his own early life; it was published in 1974.

== Sources ==
- bio of Edwards
- Edwards 6th circuit page
- Pioneer At Law book review
- Bridging the river of Hatred: The Pioneering Efforts of Detroit Police Commissioner George Edwards

Legal offices
Preceded by Thomas Francis McAllister	Judge of the United States Court of Appeals for the Sixth Circuit; 1963–1985	Succeeded by James L. Ryan
Preceded by Harry Phillips	Chief Judge of the United States Court of Appeals for the Sixth Circuit; 1979–1983	Succeeded by Pierce Lively
