= Rogers v. Wal-Mart Stores, Inc. =

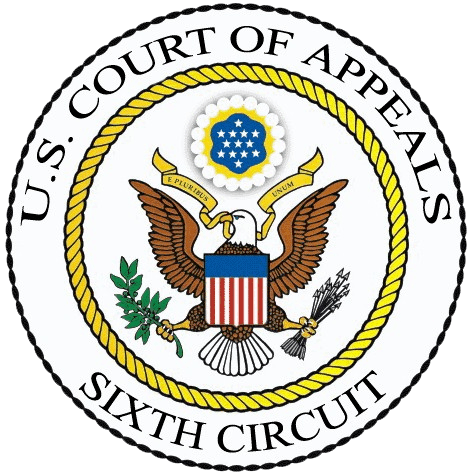
- Court: United States Court of Appeals for the Sixth Circuit
- Full case name: Shirley K. Rogers v. Wal-Mart Stores, Inc.
- Argued: September 13, 2000
- Decided: October 26, 2000
- Citation: 230 F.3d 868

Case history
- Prior history: Motion to remand denied by U.S. District Court for the Western District of Tennessee, June 23, 1999

Court membership
- Judges sitting: Ralph B. Guy Jr., Karen Nelson Moore, David D. Dowd, Jr. (N.D. Ohio)

Case opinions
- Majority: Dowd, joined by a unanimous court

Laws applied
- 28 U.S.C. § 1441

Rogers v. Wal-Mart Stores, Inc., 230 F.3d 868 (6th Cir. 2000), was a case decided by the United States Court of Appeals for the Sixth Circuit that held that remand to a state court cannot be achieved after removal to a federal court by lowering the damages sought to fall below the amount in controversy requirement.

== Decision ==
The plaintiff sued Walmart in state court for a state law negligence action, seeking $950,000 in damages. Pursuant to 28 U.S.C. § 1441, the defendant removed to federal court on the basis of diversity jurisdiction. The plaintiff reduced the damages sought to less than $75,000 and petitioned for remand to state court because the amount in controversy requirement was no longer met. The 6th Circuit upheld a denial of the petition for remand, holding that the amount in controversy at the time of removal was what mattered.
