= Shackelford Miller Jr. =

American judge (1892–1965)

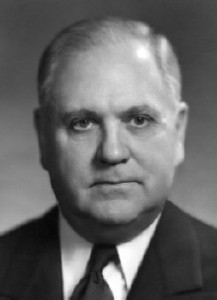
- Miller in 1950

Senior Judge of the United States Court of Appeals for the Sixth Circuit
- In office November 1, 1965 – November 24, 1965

Chief Judge of the United States Court of Appeals for the Sixth Circuit
- In office 1961–1962
- Preceded by: Thomas Francis McAllister
- Succeeded by: Lester LeFevre Cecil

Judge of the United States Court of Appeals for the Sixth Circuit
- In office December 11, 1945 – November 1, 1965
- Appointed by: Harry S. Truman
- Preceded by: Elwood Hamilton
- Succeeded by: Bert Combs

Judge of the United States District Court for the Western District of Kentucky
- In office March 4, 1939 – December 20, 1945
- Appointed by: Franklin D. Roosevelt
- Preceded by: Elwood Hamilton
- Succeeded by: Roy Mahlon Shelbourne

Personal details
- Born: Shackelford Miller Jr. September 4, 1892 Louisville, Kentucky, U.S.
- Died: November 24, 1965 (aged 73)
- Education: Princeton University (AB); Harvard Law School (LLB)

Shackelford Miller Jr. (September 4, 1892 – November 24, 1965) was a United States circuit judge of the United States Court of Appeals for the Sixth Circuit and previously was a United States district judge of the United States District Court for the Western District of Kentucky.

== Education and career ==
Born in Louisville, Kentucky, Miller received an Artium Baccalaureus degree from Princeton University in 1914. He received a Bachelor of Laws from Harvard Law School in 1917. He was in private practice of law in Louisville from 1919 to 1939.

== Federal judicial service ==
Miller was nominated by President Franklin D. Roosevelt on February 16, 1939, to a seat on the United States District Court for the Western District of Kentucky vacated by Judge Elwood Hamilton. He was confirmed by the United States Senate on February 20, 1939, and received his commission on March 4, 1939. His service was terminated on December 20, 1945, due to his elevation to the Sixth Circuit.

Miller was nominated by President Harry S. Truman on November 23, 1945, to a seat on the United States Court of Appeals for the Sixth Circuit vacated by Judge Elwood Hamilton. He was confirmed by the Senate on December 4, 1945, and received his commission on December 11, 1945. He served as Chief Judge and as a member of the Judicial Conference of the United States from 1961 to 1962. He assumed senior status on November 1, 1965. His service was terminated on November 24, 1965, due to his death.

== Sources ==
Legal offices
Preceded by Elwood Hamilton	Judge of the United States District Court for the Western District of Kentucky; 1939–1945	Succeeded by Roy Mahlon Shelbourne
Preceded by Elwood Hamilton	Judge of the United States Court of Appeals for the Sixth Circuit; 1945–1965	Succeeded by Bert Combs
Preceded by Thomas Francis McAllister	Chief Judge of the United States Court of Appeals for the Sixth Circuit; 1961–1962	Succeeded by Lester LeFevre Cecil
