= Thomas Francis McAllister =

American judge (1896–1976)

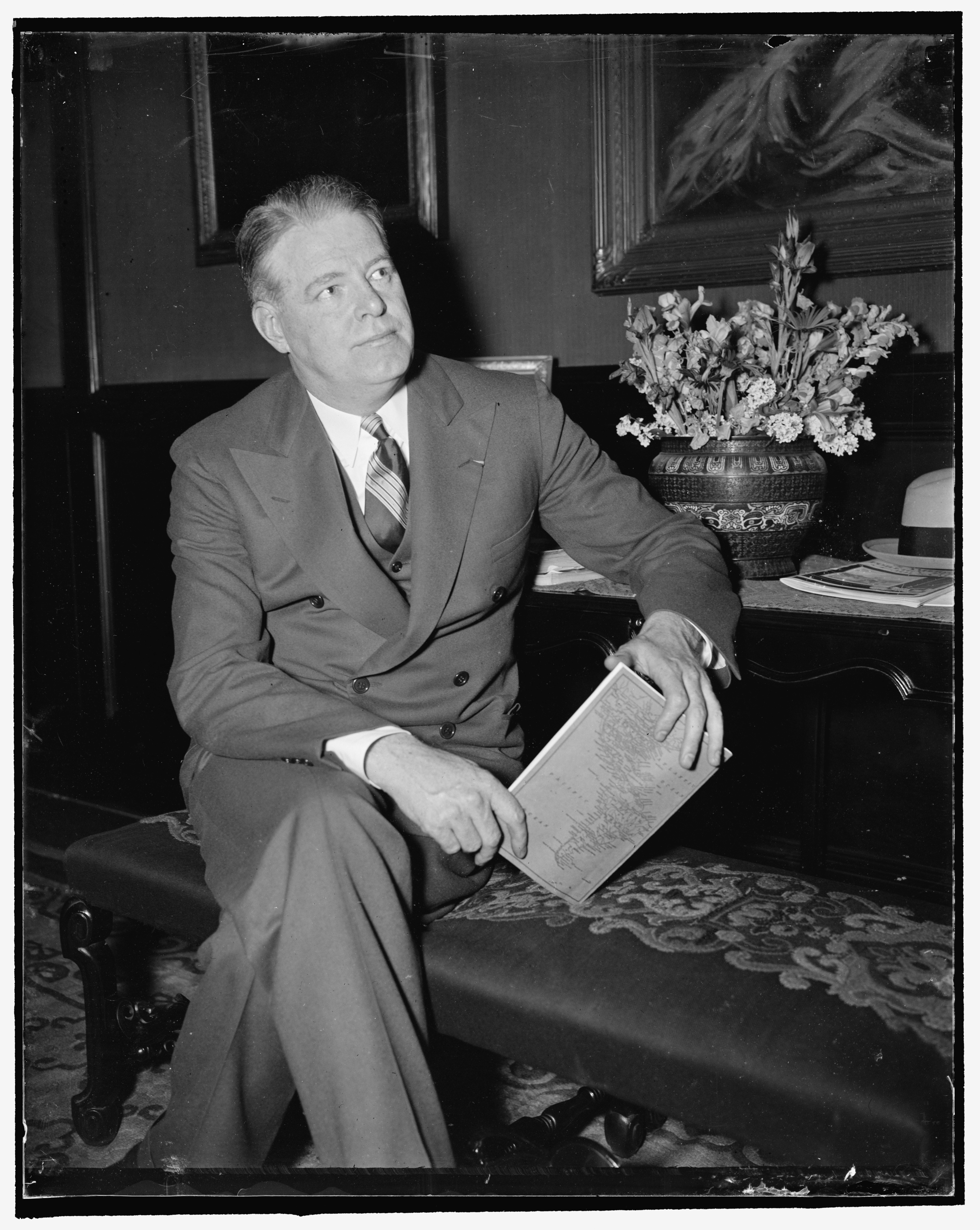
- McAllister in 1937

Senior Judge of the United States Court of Appeals for the Sixth Circuit
- In office January 1, 1963 – November 10, 1976

Chief Judge of the United States Court of Appeals for the Sixth Circuit
- In office 1959–1961
- Preceded by: John Donelson Martin Sr.
- Succeeded by: Shackelford Miller Jr.

Judge of the United States Court of Appeals for the Sixth Circuit
- In office May 22, 1941 – January 1, 1963
- Appointed by: Franklin D. Roosevelt
- Preceded by: Herschel W. Arant
- Succeeded by: George Clifton Edwards Jr.

Personal details
- Born: Thomas Francis McAllister; March 4, 1896 Grand Rapids, Michigan, U.S.
- Died: November 10, 1976 (aged 80)
- Party: Democratic
- Education: University of Michigan Law School (AB) read law

Thomas Francis McAllister (March 4, 1896 – November 10, 1976) was a United States circuit judge of the United States Court of Appeals for the Sixth Circuit.

== Education and career ==
Born in Grand Rapids, Michigan, McAllister was a volunteer in the French Foreign Legion from 1917 to 1918. He received an Artium Baccalaureus degree from the University of Michigan Law School in 1918 and read law to enter the bar in 1921. He was in private practice in Grand Rapids from 1921 to 1937. He was a member of the Michigan State Advisory Liquor Commission in 1933. He was a Democratic candidate for the United States House of Representatives from Michigan in 1934 and 1936. He was a special assistant to the United States attorney general for the Criminal Division of the United States Department of Justice in 1937. He was a justice of the Supreme Court of Michigan from 1938 to 1941. He was a member of the Attorney General's Commission on Bankruptcy Administration in 1939.

== Federal judicial service ==
McAllister was nominated by President Franklin D. Roosevelt on April 25, 1941, to a seat on the United States Court of Appeals for the Sixth Circuit vacated by Judge Herschel W. Arant. He was confirmed by the United States Senate on May 19, 1941, and received his commission on May 22, 1941. He was a Judge of the Emergency Court of Appeals from 1945 to 1962. He served as Chief Judge from 1959 to 1961. He was a member of the Judicial Conference of the United States from 1959 to 1960. He assumed senior status on January 1, 1963. McAllister served in that capacity until his death on November 10, 1976.

== Sources ==
Legal offices
Preceded by Herschel W. Arant	Judge of the United States Court of Appeals for the Sixth Circuit; 1941–1963	Succeeded by George Clifton Edwards Jr.
Preceded by John Donelson Martin Sr.	Chief Judge of the United States Court of Appeals for the Sixth Circuit; 1959–1961	Succeeded by Shackelford Miller Jr.
