= Smith Hickenlooper =

American judge (1880–1933)

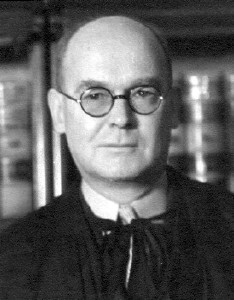

Judge of the United States Court of Appeals for the Sixth Circuit
- In office December 17, 1928 – December 22, 1933
- Appointed by: Calvin Coolidge
- Preceded by: Maurice H. Donahue
- Succeeded by: Florence E. Allen

Judge of the United States District Court for the Southern District of Ohio
- In office March 3, 1923 – January 7, 1929
- Appointed by: Warren G. Harding
- Preceded by: John Weld Peck
- Succeeded by: Robert Reasoner Nevin

Personal details
- Born: February 13, 1880 Cincinnati, Ohio, U.S.
- Died: December 22, 1933 (aged 53) Cincinnati, Ohio, U.S.
- Spouse: Anna Bailey Wright
- Parents: Andrew Hickenlooper; Maria Lloyd Smith Hickenlooper
- Relatives: John Hickenlooper (paternal grandson); George Hickenlooper (paternal grandson)
- Education: University of Cincinnati (BA); Harvard University (LLB)

Military service
- Branch/service: United States Army
- Battles/wars: World War I

Smith Hickenlooper (February 13, 1880 – December 22, 1933) was an American attorney and jurist who served as a United States circuit judge of the United States Court of Appeals for the Sixth Circuit. He was previously a United States district judge of the United States District Court for the Southern District of Ohio.

== Early life and education ==
Born in Cincinnati, Ohio, Hickenlooper was the son of Maria Lloyd (Smith) and Andrew Hickenlooper, who was a civil engineer, politician, industrialist, and a Union Army lieutenant colonel. He graduated from Woodward High School, and received a Bachelor of Arts degree from the University of Cincinnati in 1901 and a Bachelor of Laws from Harvard Law School in 1904. While at the University of Cincinnati, Smith, along with his brother Andrew, founded Sigma Sigma in 1898.

== Career ==
He was in private practice in Cincinnati from 1904 to 1918, also serving as a member of the Cincinnati Board of Education from 1908 to 1909, and as a member of the board of directors of the University of Cincinnati from 1910 to 1916. He was an assistant prosecuting attorney of Hamilton County, Ohio from 1916 to 1918, but left to join the United States Army during World War I, serving as a private in a field artillery unit in 1918. Hickenlooper returned to Ohio before the end of 1918 and served as a judge on the Superior Court of Cincinnati from 1918 to 1923.

=== Federal judicial service ===
Hickenlooper was nominated by President Warren G. Harding on March 3, 1923, to a seat on the United States District Court for the Southern District of Ohio vacated by Judge John Weld Peck. He was confirmed by the United States Senate on March 3, 1923, and received his commission the same day. His service terminated on January 7, 1929, due to his elevation to the Sixth Circuit.

Hickenlooper was nominated by President Calvin Coolidge on December 6, 1928, to a seat on the United States Court of Appeals for the Sixth Circuit vacated by Judge Maurice H. Donahue. He was confirmed by the Senate on December 17, 1928, and received his commission the same day. His service terminated on December 22, 1933, due to his death in Cincinnati.

== Personal life ==
Hickenlooper married Anna Bailey Wright of Cincinnati on October 18, 1910. His grandson is U.S. Senator and former governor John Hickenlooper. He is also related to pianist Olga Samaroff, (née Lucy Mary Olga Agnes Hickenlooper).

== Sources ==
Legal offices
Preceded by John Weld Peck	Judge of the United States District Court for the Southern District of Ohio; 1923–1929	Succeeded by Robert Reasoner Nevin
Preceded by Maurice H. Donahue	Judge of the United States Court of Appeals for the Sixth Circuit; 1928–1933	Succeeded by Florence E. Allen
