= John Wesley Warrington =

American judge (1844–1921)

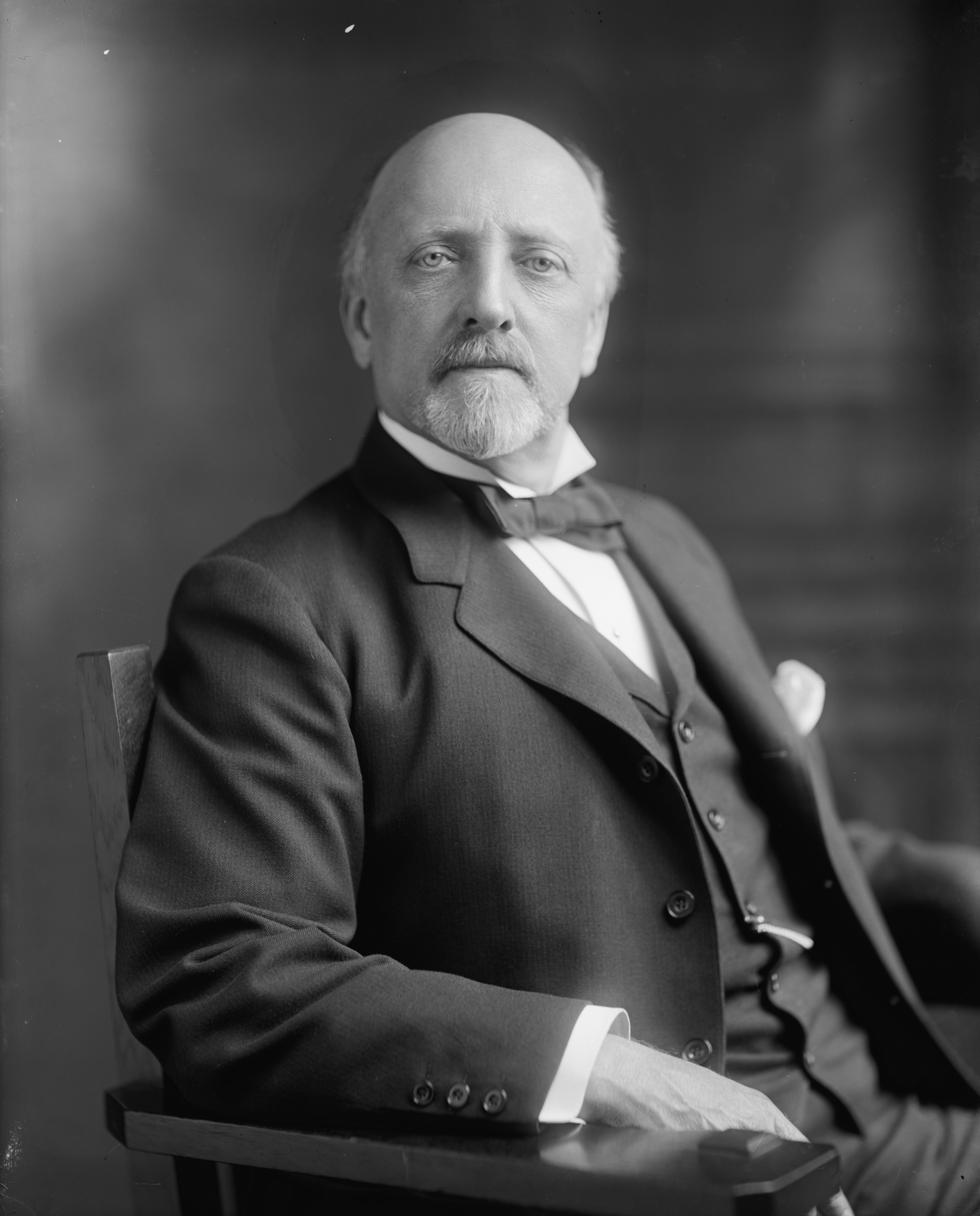
- Portrait by Harris & Ewing, 1905–1921

Senior Judge of the United States Court of Appeals for the Sixth Circuit
- In office October 6, 1919 – May 26, 1921

Judge of the United States Court of Appeals for the Sixth Circuit
- In office March 16, 1909 – October 6, 1919
- Appointed by: William Howard Taft
- Preceded by: John K. Richards
- Succeeded by: Maurice H. Donahue

Judge of the United States Circuit Courts for the Sixth Circuit
- In office March 16, 1909 – December 31, 1911
- Appointed by: William Howard Taft
- Preceded by: John K. Richards
- Succeeded by: Seat abolished

Personal details
- Born: John Wesley Warrington; July 22, 1844 Clark County, Ohio
- Died: May 26, 1921 (aged 76) Cincinnati, Ohio
- Party: Republican
- Education: Cincinnati Law School (LLB)
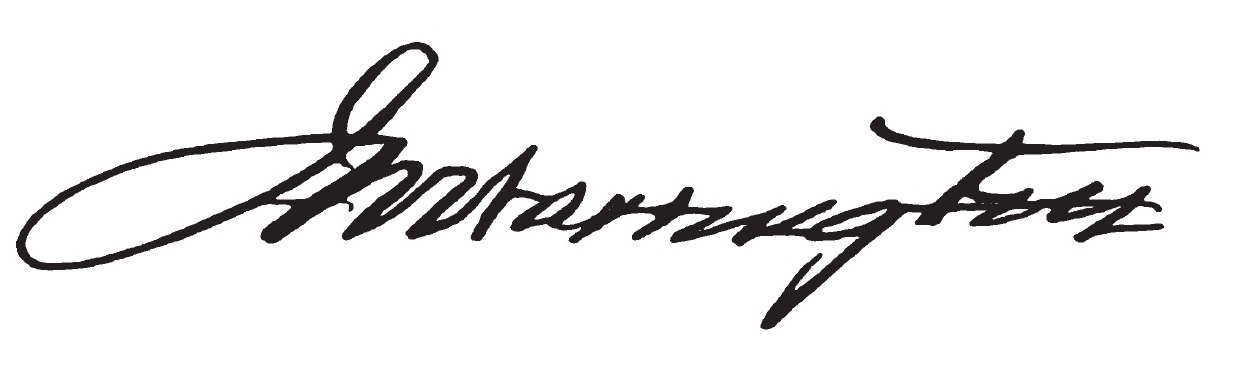
- Signature

John Wesley Warrington (July 22, 1844 – May 26, 1921) was a United States circuit judge of the United States Court of Appeals for the Sixth Circuit and the United States Circuit Courts for the Sixth Circuit.

== Early life ==
Born in Clark County, Ohio, Warrington joined the United States Army during the American Civil War, serving in the 110th Ohio Infantry from 1862 to 1865. He thereafter attended Cincinnati Law School (now the University of Cincinnati College of Law), receiving a Bachelor of Laws in 1869.

== Career ==
Warrington worked for the city of Cincinnati, Ohio, as an assistant city solicitor from 1869 to 1873, and then as city solicitor until 1875. He was a Republican Presidential elector for Hayes/Wheeler in 1876. He was in private practice in Cincinnati from 1876 to 1909, during which time he was a professor of equity jurisprudence and trusts at the Cincinnati Law School, from 1901 to 1904. He was president of the Ohio State Bar Association in 1902.

Warrington was nominated by President William Howard Taft on March 16, 1909, to a joint seat on the United States Court of Appeals for the Sixth Circuit and the United States Circuit Courts for the Sixth Circuit vacated by Judge John K. Richards. He was confirmed by the United States Senate on March 16, 1909, and received his commission the same day. On December 31, 1911, the Circuit Courts were abolished and he thereafter served only on the Court of Appeals.

He assumed senior status on October 6, 1919, becoming the first judge to enter this form of semi-retirement, which had recently been created by statute.

== Personal life ==
Warrington died on May 26, 1921, in Cincinnati.

Legal offices
Preceded by John K. Richards	Judge of the United States Circuit Courts for the Sixth Circuit; 1909–1911	Succeeded by Seat abolished
Preceded by John K. Richards	Judge of the United States Court of Appeals for the Sixth Circuit; 1909–1919	Succeeded by Maurice H. Donahue
