= Herschel W. Arant =

American judge (1887–1941)

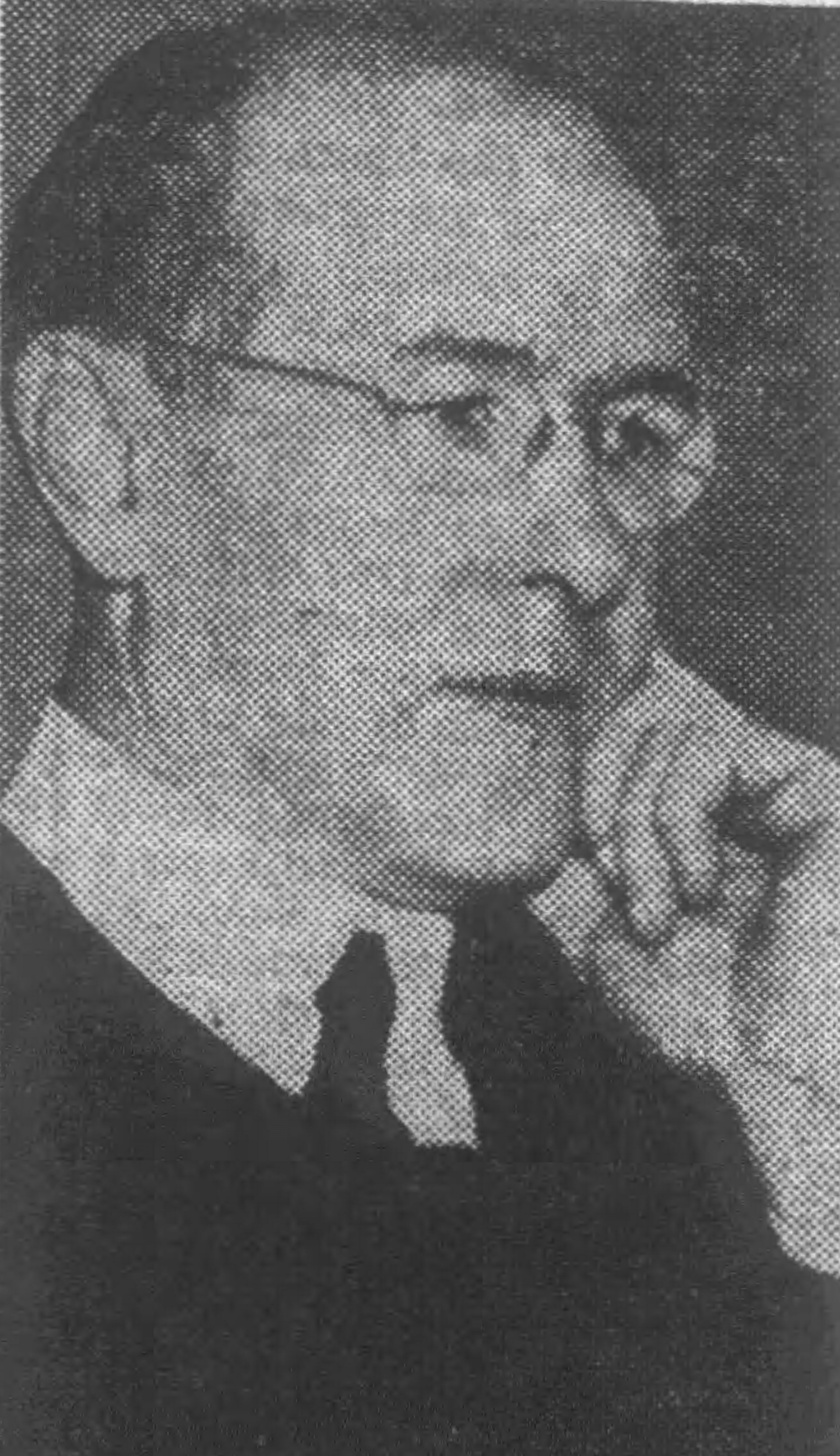

Judge of the United States Court of Appeals for the Sixth Circuit
- In office March 4, 1939 – January 14, 1941
- Appointed by: Franklin D. Roosevelt
- Preceded by: Seat established by 52 Stat. 584
- Succeeded by: Thomas Francis McAllister

7th Dean of Moritz College of Law
- In office 1928–1939
- Preceded by: Alonzo H. Tuttle
- Succeeded by: Arthur T. Martin

Dean of University of Kansas School of Law
- In office 1922–1928

Personal details
- Born: Herschel Whitfield Arant; July 18, 1887 Church Hill, Alabama, U.S.
- Died: January 14, 1941 (aged 53)
- Education: University of Alabama (BS); Yale University (BA, MA, LLB)

Herschel Whitfield Arant (July 18, 1887 – January 14, 1941), frequently known as H. W. Arant, was a United States circuit judge of the United States Court of Appeals for the Sixth Circuit and former dean of the Ohio State University Moritz College of Law.

== Education and career ==
Born in Church Hill, Alabama, Arant received a Bachelor of Science degree from the University of Alabama in 1910. He went on to receive a Bachelor of Arts degree from Yale University in 1911, a Master of Arts degree from the same institution in 1913, and a Bachelor of Laws from Yale Law School in 1915. Arant entered private practice in Atlanta, Georgia from 1915 to 1920. He was a professor of law at the Emory University School of Law from 1916 to 1920, and then the Yale Law School as an assistant professor from 1920 to 1922. He was a professor of law and dean at the University of Kansas School of Law from 1922 to 1928, and then moved to hold the same positions at the Ohio State University Moritz College of Law from 1928 to 1939.

== Federal judicial service ==
Arant was nominated by President Franklin D. Roosevelt on February 9, 1939, to the United States Court of Appeals for the Sixth Circuit, to a new seat authorized by 52 Stat. 584. He was confirmed by the United States Senate on February 21, 1939, and received his commission on March 4, 1939. His service terminated on January 14, 1941, due to his death.

== Sources ==
Legal offices
Preceded by Seat established by 52 Stat. 584	Judge of the United States Court of Appeals for the Sixth Circuit; 1939–1941	Succeeded by Thomas Francis McAllister
