= Arthur T. Martin =

8th Dean of Moritz College of Law
- In office 1940–1946
- Preceded by: Herschel W. Arant
- Succeeded by: Harry W. Vanneman

Personal details
- Born: 1903 Hadjin, Ottoman Empire
- Died: February 7, 1946 (aged 42–43) Columbus, Ohio
- Education: Oberlin, B.A. Ohio State, J.D. Columbia, LL.M
- Occupation: Professor; Lawyer; Administrator

Arthur T. Martin (1903–1946) was the eighth Dean of the Ohio State University Moritz College of Law.

== Education ==
Martin was born in the Ottoman Empire to a Canadian father. He became a US citizen in 1931.

Martin received a bachelor's degree from Oberlin College in 1923. He then received a law degree from the Ohio State University Moritz College of Law in 1929 and master's of law degree from the Columbia Law School in 1930.

== Legal career ==
Martin entered academia as a member of the faculty at the Ohio State University Moritz College of Law, teaching as an assistant professor of law from 1930 to 1934, associate professor of law from 1934 to 1937, and became a full professor of law in 1937. In 1940, Martin became the eighth Dean of the Ohio State University Ohio State until his death in 1946 at the age of 43.

In addition to teaching, Martin was on the legal staff of the National Recovery Administration in 1934 and 1935, a U.S. Labor Department referee in 1936 and 1937, a War Production Board Commissioner in 1942 and an arbitrator and mediator for the National War Labor Board in 1942 and 1943. He also served as chairman of the Administrative Law Commission of the State of Ohio in 1941 and 1942.

== Scholarly work ==
Martin focused his scholarly work on property law publishing “Cases and Other Materials on the Law of Conveyances” in 1939 and “Cases and Materials on the Law of Real Property” in 1943.

Academic offices
Preceded by Herschel W. Arant	Dean of Moritz College of Law; 1965-1970	Succeeded by Jefferson B. Fordham
