= Coleman W. Avery =

American judge (1880–1938)

Ohio Supreme Court Associate Justice
- In office June 10, 1920 – December 7, 1920
- Appointed by: James M. Cox
- Preceded by: Stanley W. Merrell
- Succeeded by: Benson W. Hough

Personal details
- Born: February 22, 1880 Cincinnati, Ohio, U.S.
- Died: March 14, 1938 (aged 58) Cincinnati, Ohio, U.S.
- Resting place: Spring Grove Cemetery
- Party: Democratic
- Spouse(s): Elinor Coates Baer; Sarah Loving
- Children: 5
- Education: University of Cincinnati; University of Cincinnati College of Law

Coleman W. Avery (February 22, 1880 – March 14, 1938) was an American judge. He came from a prominent, wealthy family in Cincinnati, Ohio, in the United States. He was appointed as a justice of the Ohio Supreme Court in 1920. He killed himself after murdering his wife in 1938.

== Biography ==
Coleman W. Avery was born on February 22, 1880. He was the son of William Ledyard and Johanna Avery of Cincinnati, Ohio. He was educated in the public schools of the city and graduated in 1902 from the University of Cincinnati, and in 1905 from the University of Cincinnati College of Law.

Avery was admitted to the bar in 1905, and first held public office in 1909, when Hamilton County prosecutor Henry T. Hunt appointed him an assistant prosecutor. In 1912, he was named assistant city solicitor for Cincinnati. In 1914, he ran unsuccessfully for Hamilton County Court of Common Pleas judge.

Beginning in 1915, Avery had a private practice, and taught at the Cincinnati Law School from 1916 to 1918. He was also a special district attorney for war work for the United States attorney for the Southern District of Ohio, 1917 to 1919. He also served as a major in the Second Battalion, Cincinnati Home Guards.

In 1919, Avery returned to private practice. On June 10, 1920, Stanley W. Merrell resigned from the Ohio Supreme Court, and Ohio Governor James M. Cox appointed Avery to the court that same day. He lost the November election that year to finish the last two years of the term to Ohio Adjutant General Benson W. Hough. His term ended December 7, 1920.

Following his electoral defeat, Avery returned to Cincinnati. He returned to private practice, and lectured at the YMCA School of Law of Cincinnati night classes. In 1935, his oldest son joined him in private practice.

Avery married Elinor Coates Baer of Baltimore, Maryland, in 1904. She had five children, and died May 22, 1928, in Asheville, North Carolina, from tuberculosis. Avery married Sarah Loving, of Lynchburg, Virginia, in 1934.

During the Great Depression, Avery's failing investments in real estate, and uncollected fees of $35,000, put financial stress on his family. He was hospitalized for depression, drank heavily, and had a heart attack. On March 14, 1938, after arguing with his wife over his driving after drinking, Avery murdered his second wife, and killed himself at his North Bend Road mansion.

A private service was held for Avery's family on March 16, 1938, with burial later that day at Spring Grove Cemetery.
