= The George Washington Law Review =

- Discipline: Law
- Language: English
- Edited by: Tegan V. Oliver

Publication details
- History: 1932–present
- Publisher: The George Washington Law Review
- Frequency: Bimonthly
- Open access: Yes
- Impact factor: 1.548 (2021)

Standard abbreviations
- Bluebook: Geo. Wash. L. Rev.
- ISO 4: George Wash. Law Rev.

Indexing
- ISSN: 0016-8076
- LCCN: 36031422
- OCLC no.: 818988457

Links
- Journal homepage; Online archive

The George Washington Law Review is a bimonthly law review edited and published by students at the George Washington University Law School. The Law Review was established in 1931 and is a continuation of the Constitutional Review, published from 1917–1931. The Law Review publishes scholarly articles, essays, and student notes.

The inaugural volume of the George Washington Law Review expressed the goal of serving the emerging specialization of governmental law:

The practice of law, as most modern professions, has developed tendencies toward specialization. One of the most rapidly developing of these specialized branches of legal learning is the broad field of governmental law. Thousands of attorneys throughout the country are specializing and even limiting their practices to such matters as patents, taxation, interstate commerce, trade regulation, and international law. It is our hope to serve this large class of the profession. The proximity of this University to the primary sources of governmental law suggests naturally specialization in this field. The scope of this REVIEW will include such subjects as, administrative law, constitutional law, trade regulation, taxation, international law, patents, interstate commerce, federal trade commission, copyrights, trade-marks, tariff commission, radio commission, veterans' administration, and immigration.
While this service to the specialist is our primary aim, we hope, in addition, to interest all members of the profession in the development of governmental law.

Since 2006, the Law Review has published the Annual Review of Administrative Law, reflecting the special focus of the legal practice in Washington, D.C. The Law Review hosts an annual symposium on legal topics of national significance, culminating in the publication of a special issue on the topic.

The George Washington Law Review Arguendo is the online companion to the Law Review, founded in 2010. Emphasizing constitutional and federal law issues, Arguendo follows an expedited editing process with the same editing standards as the print publication. The Law Review provides responsive legal commentary on Supreme Court opinions through its online forum, On the Docket.

According to the Journal Citation Reports, the journal has a 2021 impact factor of 1.548. Its 2023 impact factor was 1.61, according to the Washington and Lee University School of Law Journal Rankings.

== Membership ==
The Law Review is managed by a Board of Editors, comprising thirty-six 3L students. The Law Review selects approximately 75 rising 2L students during the Law School’s journal competition, administered annually during the spring recess. The selection process is completely anonymized and is highly selective, based on competition scores, first year grades, and personal statements.

== Notable alumni ==
- J. William Fulbright (Board of Student Editors, Vol. 2)
- Earl E. Anderson (Student Editor-in-Chief, Vol. 20)
- Bob Casey Sr. (Research Editor, Vol. 24)
- Patricia Roberts Harris (Associate Editor, Vol. 28)
- John Liu Fugh (Publicity Editor, Vol. 28)
- Gregory G. Garre (Editor-in-Chief, Vol. 59)
- Jennifer Mascott (Senior Projects Editor, Vol. 74)
- Whitney Downs Hermandorfer (Editor-in-Chief, Vol. 83)

== Notable Articles ==
- J. Edgar Hoover, Scientific Methods of Crime Detection in the Judicial Process, 4 GEO. WASH. L. REV. 1 (1935).
- James M. Landis, Legislative History of the Securities Act of 1933, 28 GEO. WASH. L. REV. 29 (1959).
- William N. Eskridge, Jr., Should the Supreme Court Read The Federalist but Not Statutory Legislative History?, 66 GEO. WASH. L. REV. 1301 (1998).
- Orin S. Kerr, A User's Guide to the Stored Communications Act, and a Legislator's Guide to Amending It, 72 GEO. WASH. L. REV. 1208 (2004).
- Amy Coney Barrett, Statutory Stare Decisis in the Courts of Appeals, 73 GEO. WASH. L. REV. 317 (2005).
- Peter L. Strauss, Overseer, or “The Decider”? The President in Administrative Law, 75 GEO. WASH. L. REV. 696 (2007).
- Mila Sohoni, The Power to Vacate a Rule, 88 GEO. WASH. L. REV. 1121 (2020).
