= Maurice H. Donahue =

American judge (1864–1928)

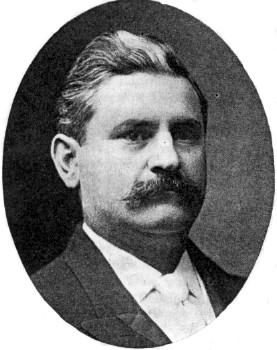
- Donahue c. 1920

Judge of the United States Court of Appeals for the Sixth Circuit
- In office October 29, 1919 – September 10, 1928
- Appointed by: Woodrow Wilson
- Preceded by: John Wesley Warrington
- Succeeded by: Smith Hickenlooper

75th Associate Justice of the Ohio Supreme Court
- In office January 1, 1911 – November 11, 1919
- Preceded by: Augustus N. Summers
- Succeeded by: Stanley W. Merrell

Personal details
- Born: Maurice Herbert Donahue; May 10, 1864 Monroe, Ohio, US
- Died: September 10, 1928 (aged 64) Bexley, Ohio, US
- Resting place: New Lexington Cemetery; New Lexington, Ohio, US
- Party: Democratic
- Education: read law

Maurice Herbert Donahue (May 10, 1864 – September 10, 1928) was the 75th Justice of the Ohio Supreme Court and a United States circuit judge of the United States Court of Appeals for the Sixth Circuit.

== Education and career ==
Born on May 10, 1864, in Monroe, Ohio, Donahue read law in 1885. He entered private practice in New Lexington, Ohio from 1885 to 1900. He was prosecutor for Perry County, Ohio from 1887 to 1903. He was a Judge of the Circuit Court of Ohio for the Fifth Judicial Circuit from 1900 to 1910, serving as Chief Judge from 1908 to 1910. He was elected as a Democrat on November 8, 1910, and reelected in 1916, as the 75th Associate Justice of the Supreme Court of Ohio, serving from January 1, 1911, to November 11, 1919.

== Federal judicial service ==
Donahue was nominated by President Woodrow Wilson on October 1, 1919, to a seat on the United States Court of Appeals for the Sixth Circuit vacated by Judge John Wesley Warrington. He was confirmed by the United States Senate on October 29, 1919, and received his commission the same day. He took the oath of office and commenced service on November 13, 1919. His service terminated on September 10, 1928, due to his death.

== Family ==
Donahue married Martina Johnson of Perry County on September 10, 1889. They had two daughters.

== Death ==
Donahue began suffering from heart disease in 1927, and worked until June 1928. He was confined to his home in Bexley, Ohio until his death there on his 39th wedding anniversary on September 10, 1928. He was buried at New Lexington Cemetery in New Lexington.

== Portrait ==
A portrait of Donahue presented by his family in December 1928 hangs in Courtroom 507 of the Potter Stewart United States Courthouse.

== Sources ==
Legal offices
Preceded by John Wesley Warrington	Judge of the United States Court of Appeals for the Sixth Circuit; 1919–1928	Succeeded by Smith Hickenlooper
