= Karen Nelson Moore =

American judge (born 1948)

Karen Moore
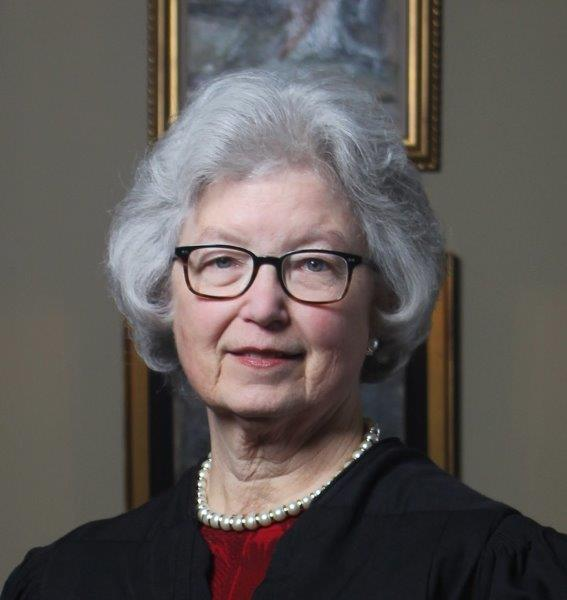

Judge of the United States Court of Appeals for the Sixth Circuit
- Incumbent
- Assumed office March 24, 1995
- Appointed by: Bill Clinton
- Preceded by: Robert B. Krupansky

Personal details
- Born: Karen Mary Nelson; 1948 (age 77–78) Washington, D.C., U.S.
- Education: Radcliffe College (BA); Harvard University (JD)

Karen Mary Nelson Moore (née Nelson; born 1948) is an American attorney and jurist serving as a United States circuit judge of the United States Court of Appeals for the Sixth Circuit. Her chambers are in Cleveland, Ohio.

== Education ==
Moore received her Artium Baccalaureus from Radcliffe College in 1970, graduating Phi Beta Kappa and magna cum laude. She received her Juris Doctor from Harvard Law School, also magna cum laude, in 1973. During her time at Harvard, Moore served as an editor for the Harvard Law Review, during which time she was the Law Review's only female member. Moore also served as an instructor for the International Tax Law Program at Harvard Law School from 1972 to 1973.

== Career ==
Moore clerked for Judge Malcolm Richard Wilkey of the United States Court of Appeals for the District of Columbia Circuit from 1973 to 1974 and was his first female law clerk. She then clerked for Justice Harry Blackmun of the United States Supreme Court during the October 1974 term. Moore was one of the first women to clerk on the Supreme Court and Blackmun's first female clerk.

From 1975 to 1977, Moore was an associate at Jones Day in Cleveland. From 1977 to 1995, she was a faculty member at Case Western Reserve University Law School. Moore was the school's first tenured female professor and the first woman to hold an endowed chair. She won awards for her teaching at Case Western, including its inaugural Teacher of the Year Award. She taught courses in civil procedure, federal income tax, complex litigation, conflict of laws, and International law.

Moore was a visiting professor at Harvard Law School from 1990 to 1991. She has also served as director and vice president of the Harvard Alumni Association and as a presiding judge for the Ames Moot Court Competition. Most recently, Moore served a six-year term for Harvard's Board of Overseers, and was elected to serve as the President of the Overseers during the 2015–16 academic year.

=== Federal judicial service ===
On January 24, 1995, President Bill Clinton nominated Moore to a seat on the United States Court of Appeals for the Sixth Circuit vacated by Judge Robert B. Krupansky. On March 24, 1995, the United States Senate confirmed her by voice vote, and she received her commission the same day.

Moore has been recognized as an academic feeder judge, with several of her former clerks on the faculty at U.S. law schools. She was also considered a contender for nomination to the United States Supreme Court in the early 2000s.

== Selected publications ==
- Moore, K.N. (1978). "Procedural Due Process in Quasi in Rem Actions After Shaffer v. Heitner." William & Mary Law Review. 20: 157–234.
- Moore, K.N. (1981). "Collateral Attack on Subject Matter Jurisdiction: A Critique of the Restatement (Second) of Judgments." Cornell Law Review. 66: 534–592.
- Moore, K.N. (1984). "Appellate Review of Judicial Disqualification Decisions in the Federal Courts." Hastings Law Journal. 35: 829–868.
- Moore, K.N. (1988). "The Foreign Tax Credit for Foreign Taxes Paid in Lieu of Income Taxes: An Evaluation of the Rationale and a Reform Proposal." American Journal on Tax Policy. 7: 207–248.
- Moore, K.N. (1989). "The Sham Transaction Doctrine: An Outmoded and Unnecessary Approach to Combating Tax Avoidance." Florida Law Review. 41: 659–719.
- Moore, K.N. (1998). "Justice Harry A. Blackmun: A Model Judge." Constitutional Law Quarterly. 26: 5–10.
- Moore, K.N. (1992). "The Supplemental Jurisdiction Statute: An Important But Controversial Supplement to Federal Jurisdiction." Emory Law Journal. 41: 31–68.
- Moore, K.N. (1993) "The Supreme Court's Role in Interpreting the Federal Rules of Civil Procedure." Hastings Law Journal. 44: 1039–1109.
- Moore, K.N. (2013). "Aliens and the Constitution." New York University Law Review. 88: 801–877.
- Moore, K.N. (2017). "Justice Blackmun and Preclusion in the State-Federal Context." Dickinson Law Review. 122: 311–331.

== See also ==
- List of law clerks for the second seat of the Supreme Court of the United States
- List of United States federal judges by longevity of service

Legal offices
Preceded by Robert B. Krupansky	Judge of the United States Court of Appeals for the Sixth Circuit; 1995–present	Incumbent
