= Elwood Hamilton =

American judge (1883–1945)

Judge of the United States Court of Appeals for the Sixth Circuit
- In office March 4, 1938 – September 19, 1945
- Appointed by: Franklin D. Roosevelt
- Preceded by: Charles Harwood Moorman
- Succeeded by: Shackelford Miller Jr.

Judge of the United States District Court for the Western District of Kentucky
- In office June 20, 1935 – April 1, 1938
- Appointed by: Franklin D. Roosevelt
- Preceded by: Charles I. Dawson
- Succeeded by: Shackelford Miller Jr.

Member of the Kentucky House of Representatives
- In office 1912-1914

Personal details
- Born: Elwood Hamilton; February 22, 1883 Benson, Kentucky, U.S.
- Died: September 19, 1945 (aged 62)
- Education: University of Louisville School of Law (LLB)

Elwood Hamilton (February 22, 1883 – September 19, 1945) was a United States circuit judge of the United States Court of Appeals for the Sixth Circuit and previously was a United States district judge of the United States District Court for the Western District of Kentucky.

== Education and career ==
Born in Benson (an unincorporated community in Franklin County), Kentucky, Hamilton received a Bachelor of Laws from the University of Louisville School of Law in 1904. He was in private practice in Frankfort, Kentucky from 1905 to 1922. He was a member of the Kentucky House of Representatives from 1912 to 1914. He was a collector of internal revenue for the State of Kentucky from 1917 to 1922, returning to private practice in Louisville, Kentucky from 1922 to 1935.

== Federal judicial service ==
Hamilton was nominated by President Franklin D. Roosevelt on June 14, 1935, to a seat on the United States District Court for the Western District of Kentucky vacated by Judge Charles I. Dawson. He was confirmed by the United States Senate on June 18, 1935, and received his commission on June 20, 1935. His service terminated on April 1, 1938, due to his elevation to the Sixth Circuit.

Hamilton was nominated by President Roosevelt on February 25, 1938, to a seat on the United States Court of Appeals for the Sixth Circuit vacated by Judge Charles Harwood Moorman. He was confirmed by the Senate on March 1, 1938, and received his commission on March 4, 1938. His service terminated on September 19, 1945, due to his death.

== Sources ==
Legal offices
Preceded by Charles I. Dawson	Judge of the United States District Court for the Western District of Kentucky; 1935–1938	Succeeded by Shackelford Miller Jr.
Preceded by Charles Harwood Moorman	Judge of the United States Court of Appeals for the Sixth Circuit; 1938–1945	Succeeded by Shackelford Miller Jr.
