= Charles Harwood Moorman =

American judge (1876–1938)

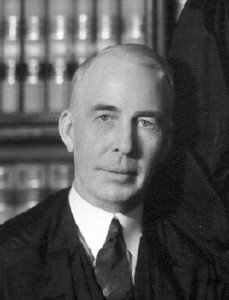

Judge of the United States Court of Appeals for the Sixth Circuit
- In office January 13, 1925 – January 26, 1938
- Appointed by: Calvin Coolidge
- Preceded by: Loyal Edwin Knappen
- Succeeded by: Elwood Hamilton

Judge of the United States District Court for the Western District of Kentucky
- In office January 8, 1924 – February 2, 1925
- Appointed by: Calvin Coolidge
- Preceded by: Walter Evans
- Succeeded by: Charles I. Dawson

Justice of the Kentucky Court of Appeals
- In office November 18, 1921 – January 8, 1924
- Preceded by: Huston Quin
- Succeeded by: Henry W. Robinson

Personal details
- Born: Charles Harwood Moorman; April 24, 1876 Big Spring, Kentucky, U.S.
- Died: January 26, 1938 (aged 61)
- Education: read law

Charles Harwood Moorman (April 24, 1876 – January 26, 1938) was a United States circuit judge of the United States Court of Appeals for the Sixth Circuit and previously was a United States district judge of the United States District Court for the Western District of Kentucky.

== Education and career ==
Born in Big Spring, Kentucky, Moorman read law to enter the bar in 1900. He was in private practice in Elizabethtown, Kentucky from 1900 to 1906, and then in Louisville, Kentucky until 1921. He volunteered with the American Red Cross in France during World War I from 1917 to 1918, and was a Major in the United States Army JAG Corps in 1918. He was a Judge of the Kentucky Court of Appeals from 1921 to 1924.

== Federal judicial service ==
Moorman was nominated by President Calvin Coolidge on January 3, 1924, to a seat on the United States District Court for the Western District of Kentucky vacated by Judge Walter Evans. He was confirmed by the United States Senate on January 8, 1924, and received his commission the same day. His service terminated on February 2, 1925, due to his elevation to the Sixth Circuit.

Moorman was nominated by President Coolidge on January 2, 1925, to a seat on the United States Court of Appeals for the Sixth Circuit vacated by Judge Loyal Edwin Knappen. He was confirmed by the Senate on January 13, 1925, and received his commission the same day. He was a member of the Conference of Senior Circuit Judges (now the Judicial Conference of the United States) from 1932 to 1937. His service terminated on January 26, 1938, due to his death.

== Sources ==
Legal offices
Preceded by Walter Evans	Judge of the United States District Court for the Western District of Kentucky; 1924–1925	Succeeded by Charles I. Dawson
Preceded by Loyal Edwin Knappen	Judge of the United States Court of Appeals for the Sixth Circuit; 1925–1938	Succeeded by Elwood Hamilton
