= Potter Stewart United States Courthouse =

US federal courthouse in Cincinnati, Ohio

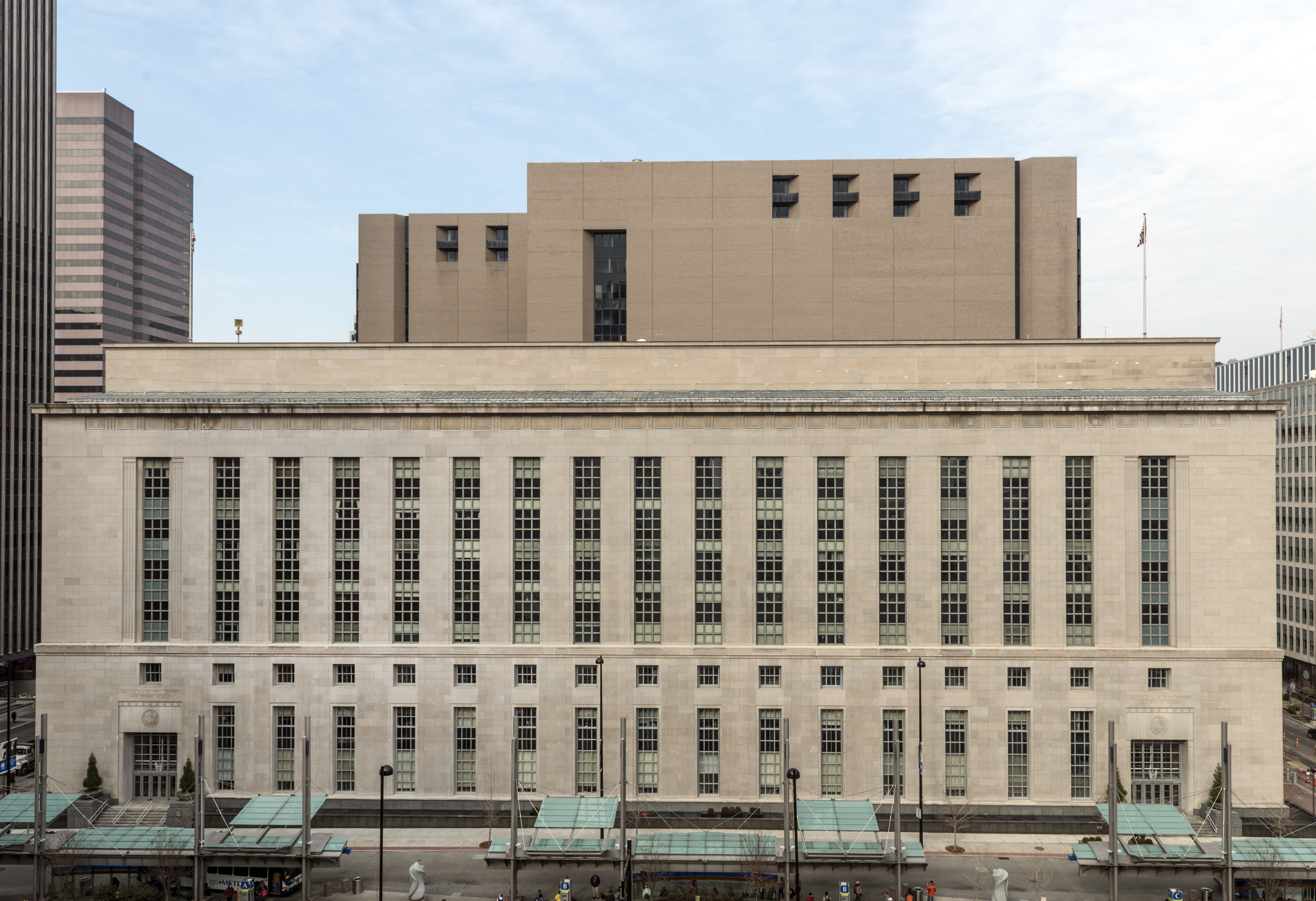
- Interactive map of the Potter Stewart United States Courthouse area
- Former names: United States Post Office and Courthouse

General information
- Architectural style: Art Moderne
- Location: Cincinnati, Ohio, 100 E. Fifth St.
- Coordinates: 39°6′6″N 84°30′38″W
- Construction started: November 30, 1936
- Inaugurated: January 14, 1939
- Cost: $3,170,000
- Owner: General Services Administration, U.S. Government

Height
- Height: 116 ft (35 m)

Technical details
- Floor count: 12
- Floor area: 432,535

Design and construction
- Architect: Louis A. Simon

The Potter Stewart United States Courthouse is a courthouse and federal building of the United States government located in Cincinnati, Ohio, and housing the headquarters of the United States District Court for the Southern District of Ohio and the United States Court of Appeals for the Sixth Circuit. Completed in 1938, it was renamed for Supreme Court Justice Potter Stewart in 1994. It was listed on the National Register of Historic Places in 2015.

== History ==
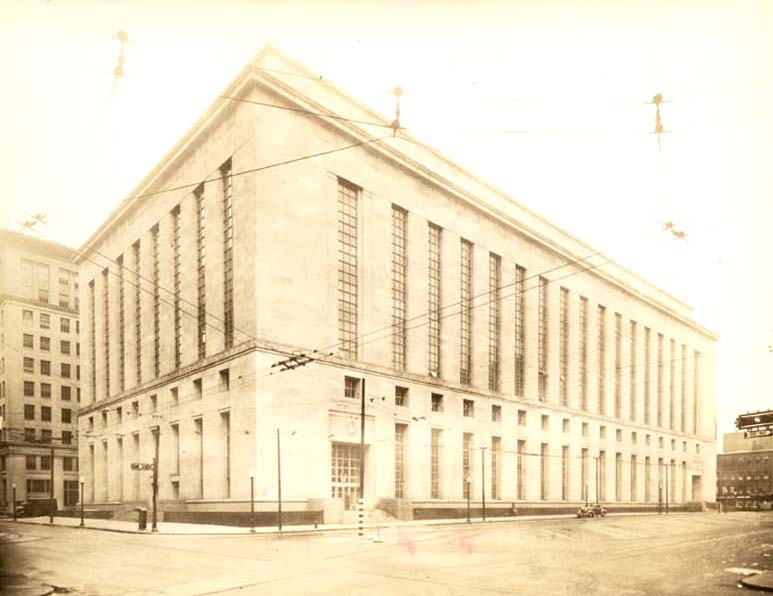
The courthouse as it appeared in 1938

The building was designed and constructed in response to the demand for suitable and adequate quarters for the growing services of the Federal Government in Cincinnati. The previous Federal building on the site, completed in 1885, had become too small. Construction was begun on November 30, 1936, and when dedicated in January 1939, the building housed 51 agencies of the Federal Government.

=== Previous courthouse ===
The existing courthouse was at the time of its construction, Cincinnati's third Federal Building. The site for the first – the southwest corner of Fourth and Vine Streets – was bought in 1851 in response to a general demand in the city that scattered Federal offices be assembled. Construction of that first building took seven years and cost $339,183. Then, after 27 years of use, the site and structure were sold in 1879 for $100,000 to make way for the Merchants' Exchange.

Even before the Government became responsive to the growing city's demand for a larger building and began to take an interest in Fifth Street as a site, the section now embraced by Fountain Square and Government Square had assumed historic importance. Three Presidents – James Monroe, Andrew Jackson and John Quincy Adams – had visited it. Abraham Lincoln had spoken there. The fountain and esplanade were installed in the early 1870s, becoming leading attractions of the city. It seemed a good place for a Federal Building, then as now. However, business men in the "Bottoms" complained when the move to Fifth Street was proposed. They contended Fifth Street was too far from the business center of the city.

The site for the United States Custom House and Post Office was acquired by condemnation and cost the Government $708,026. The act authorizing construction of a new building was passed by Congress, March 18, 1872, and signed by President Ulysses S. Grant immediately, but it was not until April 1874 that the last of the business houses on the land had been torn down. Excavation for foundations, done entirely by hand labor, required another year. In all, it took 11 years to complete construction. Its cost was $5,088,328.

=== Current courthouse ===
Nearly half a century went by, and then again, in the 1930s, the demand arose for suitable and adequate quarters for the growing services of the Federal Government in Cincinnati. The old building, completed in 1885 to house 27 departments, had grown too small. A new building was the answer, although the new structure would technically be smaller than the previous structure. The courthouse, when constructed had 6,640,000 cubic feet (188,000 m^{3}) where the old building had 7,883,500. However, the working area in the new USPO/Courthouse was 485,000 square feet (45,100 m^{2}) as against 240,000 in the old – more than double the working space in a smaller building. Part of the explanation is to be found in the fact that the new building was nine stories, where the old had only five, although the height of the old was virtually the same. The cost of the new courthouse was approximately $3,170,000.

Designed by Treasury Department architects in Washington, Supervising Architect Louis A. Simon, the new building was constructed by Great Lakes Construction Company of Chicago, as the general contractor. Calvin H. Cool, Treasury Department Construction Engineer, was in charge in Cincinnati for the two years of building, with Joseph Areokelan and O.V. Dukes as assistants. Work began November 30, 1936, with the start of demolition.

== Architecture ==
The building is located one block east of Fountain Square in downtown Cincinnati and is bounded on the half-city block by Walnut, East Fifth and Main Streets. These agencies were accommodated in a nine-story extended U-shaped building with its symmetrical long facade facing south onto East Fifth Street. The structural system is steel frame, the floors and roof are reinforced concrete and the exterior walls are clad in limestone set atop a dark granite base. The style is predominately Art Moderne.

The block-long south facade has seventeen fenestration bays as defined by vertical recessed window and spandrel panel openings. Stylized pavilions at the southeast and southwest corners contain two-story glass and aluminum framed entrances. The vertical thrust of the recessed window openings is interrupted by a Greek key belt course at the fourth floor level and terminated by a carved frieze and projecting cornice at the top of the facade. The view of this facade has been compromised by the installation of a pick-up/drop-off hub for the Southwest Ohio Regional Transit Authority's Metro bus system. This block-long facility's 1979 design consisted of a series of concrete, aluminum frame and tinted-glass kiosks of a futuristic appearance. Their location and design seriously detracted from the overall character of the building. A redesigned transit center opened in August 2006.

The half-block east and west elevations, identical to each other, have eight fenestration bays and pairs of one-story entry doors located toward the center of each elevation. The Greek key belt course and carved frieze and cornice continue from the front facade.

The north elevation has a pair of identical three-bay limestone facades on the ends of the east and west wings while the central section of the north elevation is the buff-colored brick light court. The light court rises from the roof of the first floor postal service loading dock up to the roof of the nine-story U-shaped portion.

Typically, the plan of the building is composed of a long corridor running east-west the length of the building. At the southeast and southwest corners of the building, the corridors intersect with the elevator lobbies and above the first floor, turn north to service the east and west wings of floors two through nine. The corridors of the upper floors are generally double-loaded, have tile floors, marble and plaster walls and suspended acoustical tile ceilings. The elevator lobbies have the same finishes and feature the original elevator doors and cabs.

On the interior, significant spaces are found on the first floor in the entry/elevator lobbies at the southeast and southwest corners of the building and their connecting east-west corridor, formerly the postal service lobby. These two-story lobbies and the connecting corridor have tile floors, marble walls and plaster ceilings. Also, historic courtrooms exist on the sixth and eighth floors. Although these two-story rooms have had carpeting and acoustical ceiling tiles installed, the original wood paneling and details, as well as their overall spatial volume, remains intact.
