= J. L. Carpenter =

American politician

Member of the Ohio Senate from the 8th district
- In office January 1890 – January 1894; January 1898 – January 1900

Member of the Ohio House of Representatives from the Meigs County district
- In office January 1878 – January 1882

Personal details
- Born: April 13, 1839 Columbia Township, Meigs County, Ohio, US
- Died: September 29, 1919 (aged 80) Athens, Ohio, US
- Party: Republican
- Spouse: Mary Hauk
- Children: 3
- Occupation: farmer

Jeremiah Longfellow Carpenter (April 13, 1839 – September 29, 1919) was an American politician in the state of Ohio. He served in the Ohio House of Representatives for Meigs County (63rd, 64th General Assemblies) and later the Ohio State Senate for the Eighth District (69th, 70th, 73rd General Assemblies).

Carpenter was born at a farm, Lawnfield, at Columbia Township, Meigs County, Ohio, in 1839, to Jeremiah and Sarah Ann (née Simpson) Carpenter. He was educated in the surrounding schools and became a farmer by occupation, particularly livestock farming. During his time in the Ohio General Assembly, he focused on agricultural educational issues for his particular districts. A Republican, Carpenter was also on many occasions a member of the Ohio State Central Committee. In the Senate, he sat as chairman on the Committee on Agriculture and Penitentiary, and as a member of the Finance, Labor, Common Schools, School Land, Privileges and Elections, Benevolent Institutions, Agriculture, and Rules. His state political service was lauded by the Ohio State Board of Agriculture for his "active interest in the farmers; the agricultural societies, as bodies and as individuals, have never asked anything of him that he didn't take up with pleasure and desire to execute for their interests".

He is a practical garmer and stock raiser, a business man of ability, a good executive, and his knowledge of men gained as a member of the Ohio senate from the Tenth district will make him a valuable official of the institution.

— The Athens Messenger upon his appointment as steward of the Athens State Hospital, August 4, 1904

Carpenter was a member of the Freemasons where he was a knight templar. He served on the Ohio State Board of Agriculture. In 1904, he was named a steward of the State Hospital in Athens, Ohio.

He was married to Mary Hannah Hauk and had three children, Elizabeth Hartinger née Carpenter, Sarah Emily Murphey née Carpenter, and Frankenstein Simpson Carpenter (born 1880). His son, known as simply "Frank", was a lawyer in Mount Sterling, Ohio.

He died at his Athens home on September 29, 1919, of complications of atherosclerosis.
