= Hyde Park, Cincinnati =

Coordinates: 39°8′23″N 84°26′33″W

Hyde Park
- Neighborhood of Cincinnati
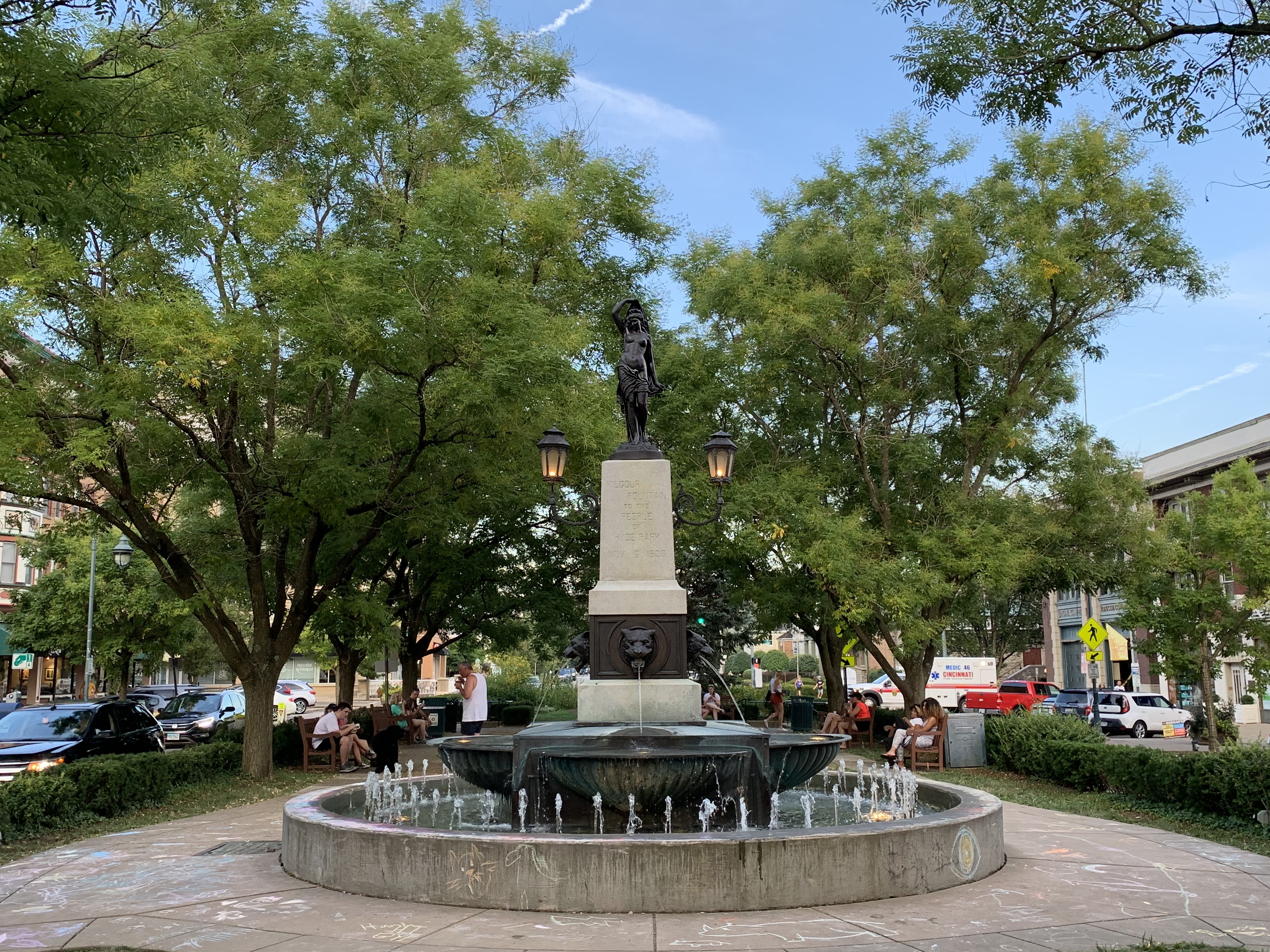
- Hyde Park Square

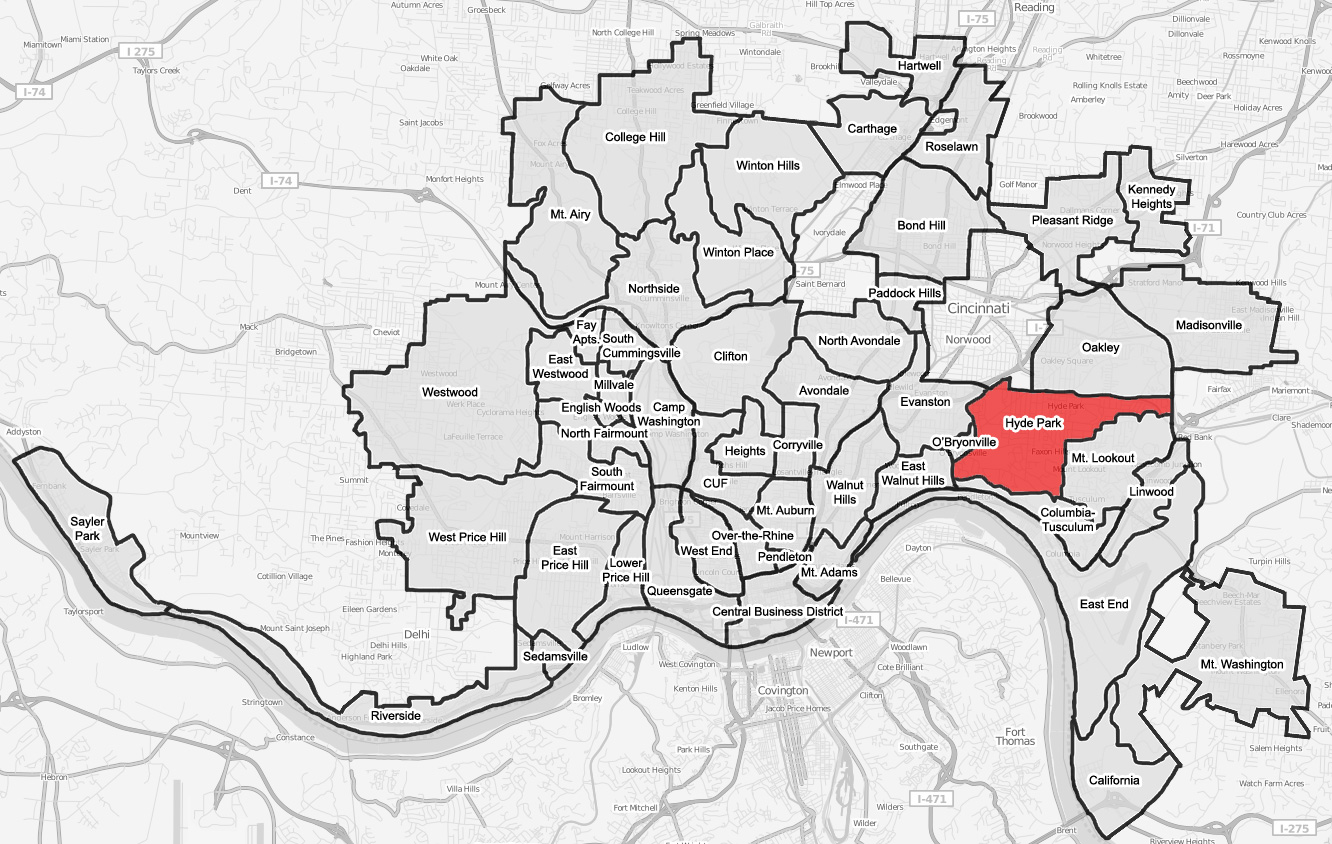
- Hyde Park (red) within Cincinnati
- Country: United States
- State: Ohio
- City: Cincinnati

Area
  - Total: 2.736 sq mi (7.09 km^{2})
- Elevation: 659 ft (201 m)

Population (2020)
  - Total: 14,193
- Time zone: UTC-5 (EST)
  - Summer (DST): UTC-4 (EDT)
- ZIP code: 45208

Hyde Park is one of the 52 neighborhoods of Cincinnati, Ohio. Originally established as a retreat for the city's wealthy, the neighborhood is predominantly residential, with a central business district known as Hyde Park Square. The population was 14,193 at the 2020 census.

== History ==
The area now home to Hyde Park initially consisted of a sparsely populated rural area until 1885, when the Norfolk and Western Railway linked it with Cincinnati in 1872. Shortly afterwards, population began to increase and in 1892, several prominent Cincinnati real estate businessmen, collectively known as the Mornington syndicate, capitalized on the new transportations to downtown and purchased much of the land to create a community exclusively for Cincinnati's wealthy, selling old parcels to residents who met such criteria. In 1896, the village of Hyde Park was incorporated and was named after the affluent hamlet of Hyde Park in New York. The name "Hyde Park" was suggested by Cincinnati architect Gustave W. Drach.

In November 1903, the western portion of Hyde Park was annexed by the City of Cincinnati. The eastern portion of the community was later annexed in 1909. Almost immediately thereafter, it experienced a real estate and population boom.

== Geography ==
Hyde Park is located on the eastern side of Cincinnati, approximately six miles away from the Central Business District. Much of the neighborhood is situated between Interstate 71 and the Ohio River. It is bordered by the neighborhoods of East Walnut Hills, Evanston, Mt. Lookout, O'Bryonville, Oakley, and the City of Norwood.

Hyde Park is located on a plateau above the Ohio River Valley and the Miami Valley. Linwood Road, Torrence Parkway and Delta Avenue, all flow towards the Ohio River and follow the major pathways by the major drainage valleys that cut into the plateau.

== Demographics ==
Population of Hyde Park 1900-2020
Year	Pop.	±%
1900	3,860	—
1910	6,499	+68.4%
1920	10,325	+58.9%
1930	14,903	+44.3%
1940	15,007	+0.7%
1950	16,357	+9.0%
1960	16,104	−1.5%
1970	17,220	+6.9%
1980	14,955	−13.2%
1990	13,927	−6.9%
2000	13,640	−2.1%
2010	13,356	−2.1%
2020	14,193	+6.3%

As of the census of 2020, there were 14,193 people living in the neighborhood. There were 7,488 housing units. The racial makeup of the neighborhood was 86.0% White, 3.8% Black or African American, 0.1% Native American, 3.3% Asian, 0.0% Pacific Islander, 1.0% from some other race, and 5.7% from two or more races. 3.6% of the population were Hispanic or Latino of any race.

There were 6,632 households, out of which 48.3% were families. 42.7% of all households were made up of individuals.

17.6% of the neighborhood's population were under the age of 18, 70.8% were 18 to 64, and 11.6% were 65 years of age or older. 44.2% of the population were male and 55.8% were female.

According to the U.S. Census American Community Survey, for the period 2016-2020 the estimated median annual income for a household in the neighborhood was $109,890. About 2.8% of family households were living below the poverty line. About 81.4% had a bachelor's degree or higher.

== Economy ==
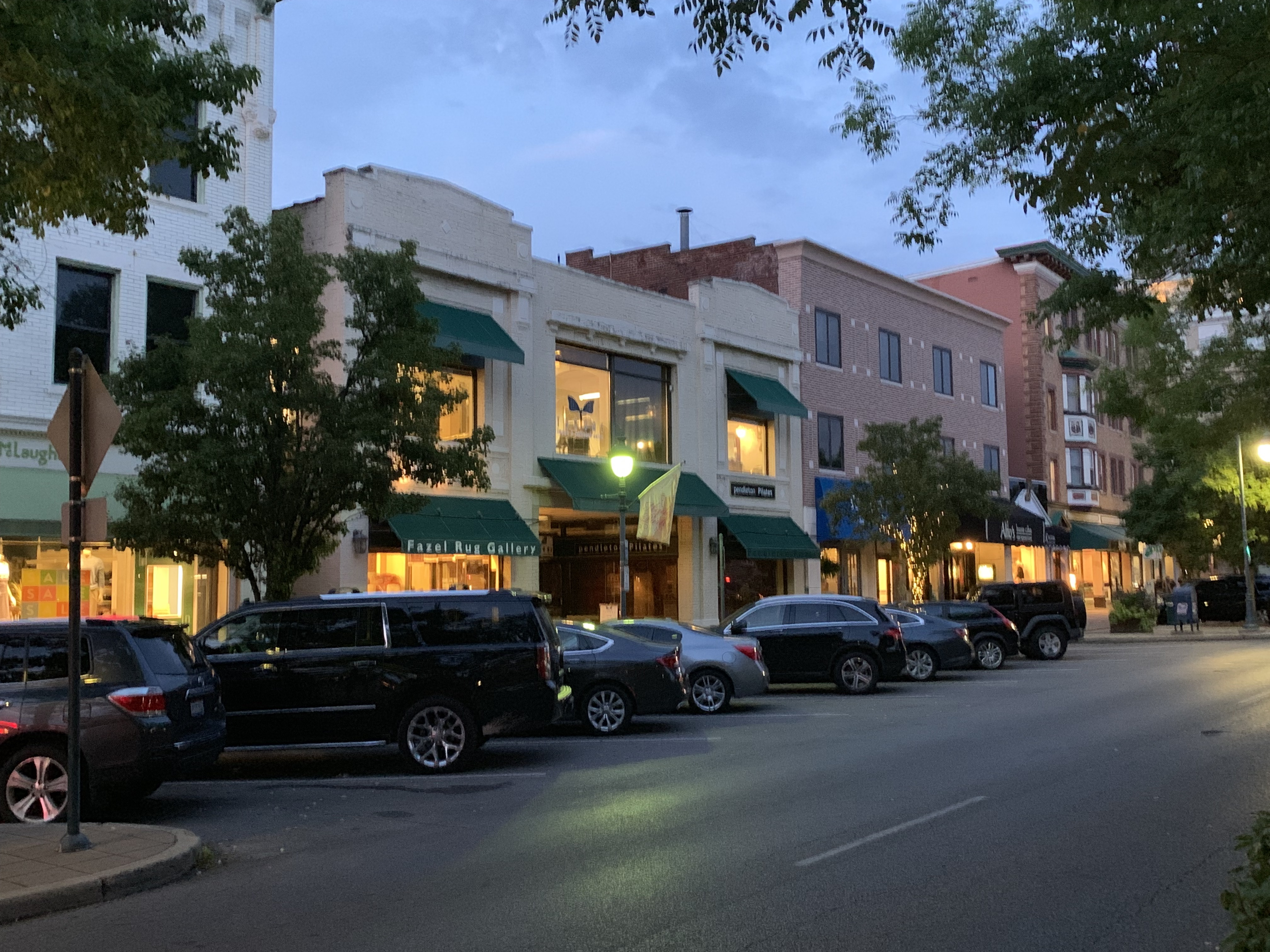
Shops and restaurants in Hyde Park

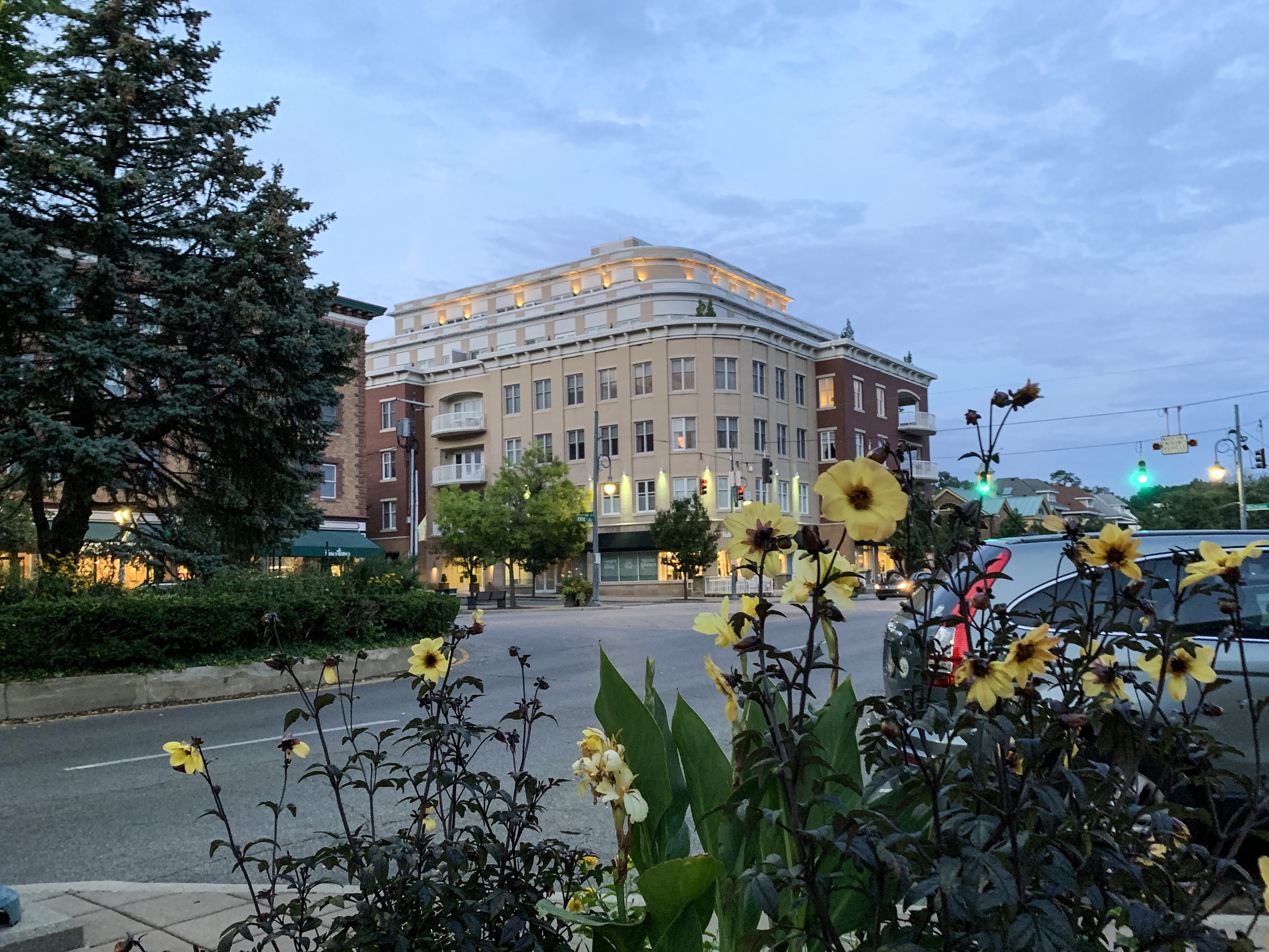
Hyde Park Square

Hyde Park is a largely residential neighborhood, as such, its economy is focused towards small, privately owned businesses. Hyde Park Square is considered the neighborhood's commercial district. The square features a park in the center surrounded by retail shops and restaurants. Its centerpiece is the Kilgour Fountain, which was donated in 1900 by John and Charles Kilgour.

== Education ==
The Cincinnati Public Schools district operates public schools, including Withrow High School, Clark Montessori, and The Hyde Park School. Private schools in the neighborhood include the Summit Country Day School, the Springer School and Center, and St. Mary Grade School.

Hyde Park is also served by a branch of the Public Library of Cincinnati and Hamilton County.

=== Schools ===
- Hyde Park School, elementary school
- Withrow High School, high school
- Clark Montessori, high school
- Summit Country Day School, Catholic school
- St. Mary Grade School, Catholic school, part of the National Blue Ribbon School Program.
- Springer School and Center

== Notable people ==
- Levi Addison Ault, Cincinnati Parks Commissioner
- Jim Borgman, Pulitzer Prize winning cartoonist
- Franklin B. Dyer, educator
- Dana Fabe, Chief Justice, Alaska Supreme Court
- Henry Heimlich, thoracic surgeon and medical researcher
- Joseph Longworth, lawyer, real-estate magnate, art collector, and philanthropist
- Stanley W. Merrell, lawyer, judge, and prosecutor
- Jim Tarbell, entrepreneur, former Cincinnati vice-mayor
