= American College of Tax Counsel =

- ACTC
- Type: Professional Association
- Established: 1981
- Affiliations: American Tax Policy Institute (ATPI); Theodore Tannenwald Jr. Foundation for Excellence in Tax Scholarship
- Director: Pamela Lyons
- Location: Rochester, New York, United States
- Website: www.actconline.org/

The American College of Tax Counsel (ACTC) was established in 1981. It is a professional organization of tax lawyers and is limited to a maximum number of 700 attorneys. Members, called “Fellows,” are peer-elected to membership in recognition of their exceptional dedication, commitment, contributions, accomplishments, and achievements related to the practice of tax law in the United States.

In order to improve the tax system in the United States, ACTC provides recommendations to the Internal Revenue Service and U.S. Congress, and provides input in selected tax cases through amicus curiae (also known as friend of the court) briefs. In addition, ACTC supports public tax policy conferences and the publication of scholarly articles through its affiliations with the American Tax Policy Institute and the Tannewald Foundation. ACTC also sponsors an annual Erwin Griswold Lecture on Tax Policy.

Charles Rettig, United States Commissioner of Internal Revenue, is a former president of ACTC.
