= United States Court of Appeals for the Sixth Circuit =

Current United States federal appellate court

- (6th Cir.)
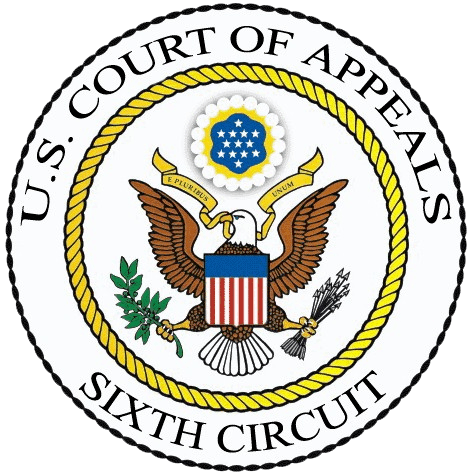

- Location: Potter Stewart U.S. Courthouse (Cincinnati, Ohio)
- Appeals from: Eastern District of Kentucky; Western District of Kentucky; Eastern District of Michigan; Western District of Michigan; Northern District of Ohio; Southern District of Ohio; Eastern District of Tennessee; Middle District of Tennessee; Western District of Tennessee
- Established: June 16, 1891
- Judges: 16
- Circuit Justice: Brett Kavanaugh
- Chief Judge: Raymond Kethledge
- www.ca6.uscourts.gov

The United States Court of Appeals for the Sixth Circuit (in case citations, 6th Cir.) is a federal court with appellate jurisdiction over the district courts in the following districts:

- Eastern District of Kentucky
- Western District of Kentucky
- Eastern District of Michigan
- Western District of Michigan
- Northern District of Ohio
- Southern District of Ohio
- Eastern District of Tennessee
- Middle District of Tennessee
- Western District of Tennessee

The court is composed of sixteen judges and is based at the Potter Stewart U.S. Courthouse in Cincinnati, Ohio. It is one of 13 United States courts of appeals.

The United States federal courts were divided into six circuits in 1801, but a circuit court of appeals was not established until the passage of the Judiciary Act of 1891.

William Howard Taft, the only person ever to serve as both President and Chief Justice of the United States, once served on the Sixth Circuit. Four other judges of the Sixth Circuit have been elevated to serve on the Supreme Court, the last being Potter Stewart in 1958.

== Current composition of the court ==
As of October 2, 2026:

#	Title	Judge	Duty station	Born	Term of service			Appointed by
#	Title	Judge	Duty station	Born	Active	Chief	Senior	Appointed by
67	Chief Judge	Raymond Kethledge	Ann Arbor, MI	1966	2008–present	2026–present	—	G.W. Bush
56	Circuit Judge	Karen Nelson Moore	Cleveland, OH	1948	1995–present	—	—	Clinton
58	Circuit Judge	Eric L. Clay	Detroit, MI	1948	1997–present	—	—	Clinton
65	Circuit Judge	Richard Allen Griffin	Traverse City, MI	1952	2005–present	—	—	G.W. Bush
71	Circuit Judge	Amul Thapar	Covington, KY	1969	2017–present	—	—	Trump
72	Circuit Judge	John K. Bush	Louisville, KY	1964	2017–present	—	—	Trump
73	Circuit Judge	Joan Larsen	Ann Arbor, MI	1968	2017–present	—	—	Trump
74	Circuit Judge	John Nalbandian	Cincinnati, OH	1969	2018–present	—	—	Trump
75	Circuit Judge	Chad Readler	Columbus, OH	1972	2019–present	—	—	Trump
76	Circuit Judge	Eric E. Murphy	Columbus, OH	1979	2019–present	—	—	Trump
77	Circuit Judge	Stephanie D. Davis	Detroit, MI	1967	2022–present	—	—	Biden
78	Circuit Judge	Andre Mathis	Memphis, TN	1980	2022–present	—	—	Biden
79	Circuit Judge	Rachel Bloomekatz	Columbus, OH	1982	2023–present	—	—	Biden
80	Circuit Judge	Kevin G. Ritz	Memphis, TN	1974	2024–present	—	—	Biden
81	Circuit Judge	Whitney Hermandorfer	Nashville, TN	1987	2025–present	—	—	Trump
82	Circuit Judge	Benjamin M. Flowers	Columbus, OH	1987	2026–present	—	—	Trump
49	Senior Judge	James L. Ryan	inactive	1932	1985–2000	—	2000–present	Reagan
50	Senior Judge	Danny Julian Boggs	Louisville, KY	1944	1986–2017	2003–2009	2017–present	Reagan
51	Senior Judge	Alan Eugene Norris	Columbus, OH	1935	1986–2001	—	2001–present	Reagan
52	Senior Judge	Richard Fred Suhrheinrich	inactive	1936	1990–2001	—	2001–present	G.H.W. Bush
53	Senior Judge	Eugene E. Siler Jr.	London, KY	1936	1991–2001	—	2001–present	G.H.W. Bush
54	Senior Judge	Alice M. Batchelder	Medina, OH	1944	1991–2019	2009–2014	2019–present	G.H.W. Bush
55	Senior Judge	Martha Craig Daughtrey	inactive	1942	1993–2009	—	2009–present	Clinton
57	Senior Judge	R. Guy Cole Jr.	Columbus, OH	1951	1995–2023	2014–2021	2023–present	Clinton
59	Senior Judge	Ronald Lee Gilman	Memphis, TN	1942	1997–2010	—	2010–present	Clinton
60	Senior Judge	Julia Smith Gibbons	Memphis, TN	1950	2002–2024	—	2024–present	G.W. Bush
61	Senior Judge	John M. Rogers	inactive	1948	2002–2018	—	2018–present	G.W. Bush
62	Senior Judge	Jeffrey Sutton	Columbus, OH	1960	2003–2026	2021–2026	2026–present	G.W. Bush
63	Senior Judge	Deborah L. Cook	Akron, OH	1952	2003–2019	—	2019–present	G.W. Bush
64	Senior Judge	David McKeague	Lansing, MI	1946	2005–2017	—	2017–present	G.W. Bush
68	Senior Judge	Helene White	Detroit, MI	1954	2008–2022	—	2022–present	G.W. Bush
69	Senior Judge	Jane Branstetter Stranch	Nashville, TN	1953	2010–2025	—	2025–present	Obama

== List of former judges ==
#	Judge	State	Born–died	Active service	Chief Judge	Senior status	Appointed by	Reason for termination
1	Howell E. Jackson	TN	1832–1895	1891–1893	—	—	Cleveland / Operation of law	elevation
2	William Howard Taft	OH	1857–1930	1892–1900	—	—	B. Harrison	resignation
3	Horace Harmon Lurton	TN	1844–1914	1893–1909	—	—	Cleveland	elevation
4	William R. Day	OH	1849–1923	1899–1903	—	—	McKinley	elevation
5	Henry Franklin Severens	MI	1835–1923	1900–1911	—	—	McKinley	resignation
6	John K. Richards	OH	1856–1909	1903–1909	—	—	T. Roosevelt	death
7	John Wesley Warrington	OH	1844–1921	1909–1919	—	1919–1921	Taft	death
8	Loyal Edwin Knappen	MI	1854–1930	1910–1924	—	1924–1930	Taft	death
9	Arthur Carter Denison	MI	1861–1942	1911–1931	—	—	Taft	resignation
10	Maurice H. Donahue	OH	1864–1928	1919–1928	—	—	Wilson	death
11	Charles Moorman	KY	1876–1938	1925–1938	—	—	Coolidge	death
12	Xenophon Hicks	TN	1872–1952	1928–1952	1948–1952	1952	Coolidge	death
13	Smith Hickenlooper	OH	1880–1933	1928–1933	—	—	Coolidge	death
14	Julian Mack	IL	1866–1943	1929–1930	—	—		reassignment
15	Charles C. Simons	MI	1876–1964	1932–1959	1952–1958	1959–1964	Hoover	death
16	Florence E. Allen	OH	1884–1966	1934–1959	1958–1959	1959–1966	F. Roosevelt	death
17	Elwood Hamilton	KY	1883–1945	1938–1945	—	—	F. Roosevelt	death
18	Herschel W. Arant	OH	1887–1941	1939–1941	—	—	F. Roosevelt	death
19	John Donelson Martin Sr.	TN	1883–1962	1940–1962	1959	—	F. Roosevelt	death
20	Thomas Francis McAllister	MI	1896–1976	1941–1963	1959–1961	1963–1976	F. Roosevelt	death
21	Shackelford Miller Jr.	KY	1892–1965	1945–1965	1961–1962	1965–1965	Truman	death
22	Potter Stewart	OH	1915–1985	1954–1958	—	—	Eisenhower	elevation
23	Lester LeFevre Cecil	OH	1893–1982	1959–1965	1962–1963	1965–1982	Eisenhower	death
24	Paul Charles Weick	OH	1899–1997	1959–1981	1963–1969	1981–1997	Eisenhower	death
25	Clifford Patrick O'Sullivan	MI	1897–1975	1960–1969	—	1969–1975	Eisenhower	death
26	Harry Phillips	TN	1909–1985	1963–1979	1969–1979	1979–1985	Kennedy	death
27	George Clifton Edwards Jr.	MI	1914–1995	1963–1985	1979–1983	1985–1995	L. Johnson	death
28	Anthony J. Celebrezze	OH	1910–1998	1965–1980	—	1980–1998	L. Johnson	death
29	John Weld Peck II	OH	1913–1993	1966–1978	—	1978–1993	L. Johnson	death
30	Wade H. McCree	MI	1920–1987	1966–1977	—	—	L. Johnson	resignation
31	Bert Combs	KY	1911–1991	1967–1970	—	—	L. Johnson	resignation
32	Henry Luesing Brooks	KY	1905–1971	1969–1971	—	—	Nixon	death
33	William Ernest Miller	TN	1908–1976	1970–1976	—	—	Nixon	death
34	W. Wallace Kent	MI	1916–1973	1970–1973	—	—	Nixon	death
35	Pierce Lively	KY	1921–2016	1972–1989	1983–1988	1989–2016	Nixon	death
36	Albert J. Engel Jr.	MI	1924–2013	1973–1989	1988–1989	1989–2013	Nixon	death
37	Damon Keith	MI	1922–2019	1977–1995	—	1995–2019	Carter	death
38	Gilbert S. Merritt Jr.	TN	1936–2022	1977–2001	1989–1996	2001–2022	Carter	death
39	Bailey Brown	TN	1917–2004	1979–1982	—	1982–1997	Carter	retirement
40	Cornelia Kennedy	MI	1923–2014	1979–1999	—	1999–2014	Carter	death
41	Boyce F. Martin Jr.	KY	1935–2016	1979–2013	1996–2003	—	Carter	retirement
42	Nathaniel R. Jones	OH	1926–2020	1979–1995	—	1995–2002	Carter	retirement
43	Leroy John Contie Jr.	OH	1920–2001	1982–1986	—	1986–2001	Reagan	death
44	Robert B. Krupansky	OH	1921–2004	1982–1991	—	1991–2004	Reagan	death
45	Harry W. Wellford	TN	1924–2021	1982–1991	—	1991–2021	Reagan	death
46	Herbert Theodore Milburn	TN	1931–2016	1984–1996	—	1996–2016	Reagan	death
47	Ralph B. Guy Jr.	MI	1929–2026	1985–1994	—	1994–2026	Reagan	death
48	David Aldrich Nelson	OH	1932–2010	1985–1999	—	1999–2010	Reagan	death
66	Susan Bieke Neilson	MI	1956–2006	2005–2006	—	—	G.W. Bush	death
70	Bernice B. Donald	TN	1951–present	2011–2022	—	2022–2023	Obama	retirement

== Chief judges ==
Chief Judge
Hicks	1948–1952
Simons	1952–1958
Allen	1958–1959
Martin	1959
McAllister	1959–1961
S. Miller, Jr.	1961–1962
Cecil	1962–1963
Weick	1963–1969
Phillips	1969–1979
Edwards, Jr.	1979–1983
Lively	1983–1988
Engel, Jr.	1988–1989
Merritt, Jr.	1989–1996
Martin, Jr.	1996–2003
Boggs	2003–2009
Batchelder	2009–2014
Cole, Jr.	2014–2021
Sutton	2021–2026
Kethledge	2026–present

Chief judges have administrative responsibilities with respect to their circuits, and preside over any panel on which they serve, unless the circuit justice (the Supreme Court justice responsible for the circuit) is also on the panel. Unlike the Supreme Court, where one justice is specifically nominated to be chief, the office of chief judge rotates among the circuit judges.

To be chief, a judge must have been in active service on the court for at least one year, be under the age of 65, and have not previously served as chief judge. A vacancy is filled by the judge highest in seniority among the group of qualified judges, with seniority determined first by commission date, then by age. The chief judge serves for a term of seven years, or until age 70, whichever occurs first. If no judge qualifies to be chief, the youngest judge over the age of 65 who has served on the court for at least one year shall act as chief until another judge qualifies. If no judge has served on the court for more than a year, the most senior judge shall act as chief. Judges can forfeit or resign their chief judgeship or acting chief judgeship while retaining their active status as a circuit judge.

When the office was created in 1948, the chief judge was the longest-serving judge who had not elected to retire, on what has since 1958 been known as senior status, or declined to serve as chief judge. After August 6, 1959, judges could not become or remain chief after turning 70 years old. The current rules have been in operation since October 1, 1982.

== Succession of seats ==
The court has 16 seats for active judges, numbered in the order in which they were initially filled. Judges who assume senior status enter a kind of retirement in which they remain on the bench but vacate their seats, thus allowing the U.S. President to appoint new judges to fill their seats.

Seat 1
Established on December 10, 1869 by the Judiciary Act of 1869 as a circuit judgeship for the Sixth Circuit
Reassigned to the United States Circuit Court of Appeals for the Sixth Circuit by the Judiciary Act of 1891
Jackson	TN	1891–1893
Lurton	TN	1893–1909
Knappen	MI	1910–1924
Moorman	KY	1925–1938
Hamilton	KY	1938–1945
S. Miller, Jr.	KY	1945–1965
Combs	KY	1967–1970
Kent	MI	1971–1973
Engel, Jr.	MI	1973–1989
Suhrheinrich	MI	1990–2001
McKeague	MI	2005–2017
Larsen	MI	2017–present

Seat 2
Established on June 16, 1891 by the Judiciary Act of 1891
Taft	OH	1892–1900
Severens	MI	1900–1911
Denison	MI	1911–1931
Simons	MI	1932–1959
O'Sullivan	MI	1960–1969
W. Miller	TN	1970–1976
Merritt, Jr.	TN	1977–2001
Gibbons	TN	2002–2024
Ritz	TN	2024–present

Seat 3
Established on January 25, 1899 by 30 Stat. 803
Day	OH	1899–1903
Richards	OH	1903–1909
Warrington	OH	1909–1919
Donahue	OH	1919–1928
Hickenlooper	OH	1928–1933
Allen	OH	1934–1959
Weick	OH	1959–1981
Krupansky	OH	1982–1991
Moore	OH	1995–present

Seat 4
Established on May 8, 1928 by 45 Stat. 492
Hicks	TN	1928–1952
Stewart	OH	1954–1958
Cecil	OH	1959–1965
Celebrezze	OH	1965–1980
Contie, Jr.	OH	1982–1986
Norris	OH	1986–2001
Cook	OH	2003–2019
Readler	OH	2019–present

Seat 5
Established on May 31, 1938 by 52 Stat. 584
Arant	OH	1939–1941
McAllister	MI	1941–1963
Edwards, Jr.	MI	1963–1985
Ryan	MI	1985–2000
Kethledge	MI	2008–present

Seat 6
Established on May 24, 1940 by 54 Stat. 219
J. Martin	TN	1940–1962
Phillips	TN	1963–1979
Brown	TN	1979–1982
Wellford	TN	1982–1991
Siler Jr.	KY	1991–2001
Rogers	KY	2002–2018
Nalbandian	KY	2018–present

Seat 7
Established on March 18, 1966 by 80 Stat. 75
Peck	OH	1966–1978
Jones	OH	1979–1995
Cole, Jr.	OH	1995–2023
Bloomekatz	OH	2023–present

Seat 8
Established on March 18, 1966 by 80 Stat. 75
McCree	MI	1966–1977
Keith	MI	1977–1995
Griffin	MI	2005–present

Seat 9
Established on June 18, 1968 by 82 Stat. 184
Brooks	KY	1969–1971
Lively	KY	1972–1989
Batchelder	OH	1991–2019
Murphy	OH	2019–present

Seat 10
Established on October 20, 1978 by 92 Stat. 1629
Kennedy	MI	1979–1999
Neilson	MI	2005–2006
White	MI	2008–2022
Davis	MI	2022–present

Seat 11
Established on October 20, 1978 by 92 Stat. 1629
B. Martin, Jr.	KY	1979–2013
Thapar	KY	2017–present

Seat 12
Established on July 10, 1984 by 98 Stat. 333
Milburn	TN	1984–1996
Gilman	TN	1997–2010
Donald	TN	2011–2022
Mathis	TN	2022–present

Seat 13
Established on July 10, 1984 by 98 Stat. 333
Nelson	OH	1985–1999
Sutton	OH	2003–2026
Flowers	OH	2026–present

Seat 14
Established on July 10, 1984 by 98 Stat. 333
Guy, Jr.	MI	1985–1994
Clay	MI	1997–present

Seat 15
Established on July 10, 1984 by 98 Stat. 333
Boggs	KY	1986–2017
Bush	KY	2017–present

Seat 16
Established on December 1, 1990 by 104 Stat. 5089
Daughtrey	TN	1993–2009
Stranch	TN	2010–2025
Hermandorfer	TN	2025–present

== Case law ==
- Rogers v. Wal-Mart Stores, Inc. 230 F.3d 868 (6th Cir. 2000)

== See also ==
- Judicial appointment history for United States federal courts#Sixth Circuit
- List of current United States circuit judges
