= Senior status =

Form of semi-retirement for US judges

Senior status is a form of semi-retirement for United States federal judges. To qualify, a judge in the federal court system must be at least 65 years old, have served at least 10 years, and the sum of the judge's age and years of service must be at least 80 years. As long as senior judges carry at least a 25 percent caseload or meet other criteria for activity, they remain entitled to maintain a staffed office and chambers, including a secretary and their normal complement of law clerks, and they continue to receive annual cost-of-living increases. The president may appoint new full-time judges to fill the vacancies in full-time judgeships caused by senior status.

Some U.S. states have similar systems for senior judges. State courts with a similar system include Iowa (for judges on the Iowa Court of Appeals), Pennsylvania, and Virginia (for justices of the Virginia Supreme Court).

== Statutory requirements ==
Senior status at the federal level is defined by statute: 28 U.S.C. § 371. To qualify for senior status, § 371(e)(1) requires that a judge be annually certified by the chief judge as having met at least one of three criteria:

- Having carried, in the preceding calendar year, a caseload involving courtroom participation which is equal to or greater than the amount of similar work which an average judge in active service would perform in three months. §371(e)(1)(a)
- Having performed, in the preceding calendar year, substantial judicial duties not involving courtroom participation, but including settlement efforts, motion decisions, writing opinions in cases that have not been orally argued, and administrative duties for the court to which the justice or judge is assigned. §371(e)(1)(b)
- Having performed substantial administrative duties, either directly relating to the operation of the courts, or for a Federal or State governmental entity. §371(e)(1)(d)

In addition, §371(e)(1)(e) provides that a judge not meeting any of these criteria may be certified as being in senior status by the chief judge if the criteria were not met "because of a temporary or permanent disability".

== Nomenclature ==
The United States Code does not refer to senior status in its body text, although the title of 28 U.S.C. § 371 is "Retirement on salary; retirement in senior status." The term senior judge is explicitly defined by 28 U.S.C. § 294 to mean an inferior court judge who is in senior status.

A justice of the Supreme Court who (after meeting the age and length of service requirements prescribed in 28 U.S.C. § 371) retires is thereafter referred to as a "retired justice". No mention is made, either in section 371 or in section 294 (which does address the assignment of retired justices), of senior justice. In practice, when a circuit or district judge on senior status sits on an inferior court case, the judge is referred to as "Senior Judge" in the opinion, while a retired justice is referred to as "Associate Justice" when doing so.

== Assignment ==
The rules governing assignment of senior judges are laid out in 28 U.S.C. § 294. In essence, under normal conditions, the chief judge or judicial council of a circuit may assign a senior judge belonging to that circuit to perform any duty within the circuit that the judge is willing and able to perform. A senior district judge can be assigned to an appellate case, and a circuit judge can be assigned to preside over a trial. For courts that do not fall within a circuit, such as the United States Court of International Trade, the chief judge of that court can assign a senior judge of that court to perform any duty within the circuit that the judge is willing and able to perform.

In special cases, the chief justice can assign a senior judge to any court. This is referred to as an assignment by designation, and requires that a certification of necessity be issued by the appropriate supervisor of the court. For a circuit or district court, this supervisor is either the chief judge or the circuit justice of the circuit. For any other court, this supervisor is the chief judge of the court.

Retired justices can be assigned to any court (except the Supreme Court) that the justice is willing to accept. Theoretically, a retired justice could also be assigned to act as circuit justice for a circuit, but this has never occurred.

== History ==
In 1919, Congress created the senior status option for inferior court judges. Before that, a judge who reached the age of seventy with at least ten years of service as a federal judge was allowed to retire and receive a pension for the rest of their life; afterward, a judge who qualified for retirement could assume senior status. John Wesley Warrington became the first federal judge to exercise this option on October 6, 1919. At that time, Warrington had been on the bench for ten years and six months and was 75 years old.

In 1937, the option was extended to Supreme Court justices, although justices so electing are generally referred to as "retired" justices rather than having senior status. A senior justice is essentially an at-large senior judge, able to be assigned to any inferior federal court by the chief justice, but receiving the salary of a retired justice. However, a retired justice no longer participates in the work of the Supreme Court itself. That same year, Willis Van Devanter became the first Supreme Court justice to exercise the option. Since this option became available to Supreme Court justices, only ten have died while still in active service, the most recent being Ruth Bader Ginsburg on September 18, 2020.

In 1954, Congress revised requirements for senior status. Federal judges or justices could still assume senior status at seventy with ten years of service, but they could also assume senior status at 65 with fifteen years of service. In 1984, the requirements were further revised to what is often called the "Rule of 80": once a judge or justice reached age 65, if the sum of years of age and years of service on the federal bench is eighty or more, the judge is entitled to senior status.

The "senior status" option was referred to as "retired judge" in 1919, when it was created. The title of "senior judge" was used to refer to the active judge with the most seniority in a given court. After 1948, the most senior judge was given the title "chief judge". In 1958, the term "senior judge" was given its current meaning of a judge who had assumed senior status.

In a 2007 article in the Cornell Law Review, David Stras and Ryan Scott suggested that senior status may be unconstitutional.

== International equivalents ==
In the United Kingdom, retired justices of the Supreme Court of the United Kingdom and certain other retired senior judges may, with the approval of the president of the Supreme Court, be appointed to a "supplementary panel" of the Court, and, at the request of the president, then sit as "acting judges". Their appointment ceases at the age of 75.
