= Connally Findlay Trigg =

Connally Findlay Trigg may refer to:

- Connally Findlay Trigg (judge) (1810-1880), American district judge
- Connally Findlay Trigg (congressman) (1847-1907), American lawyer, Confederate soldier, and Virginia Congressman
