= William L. Boyd Jr. =

American slave trader (1825–1888)

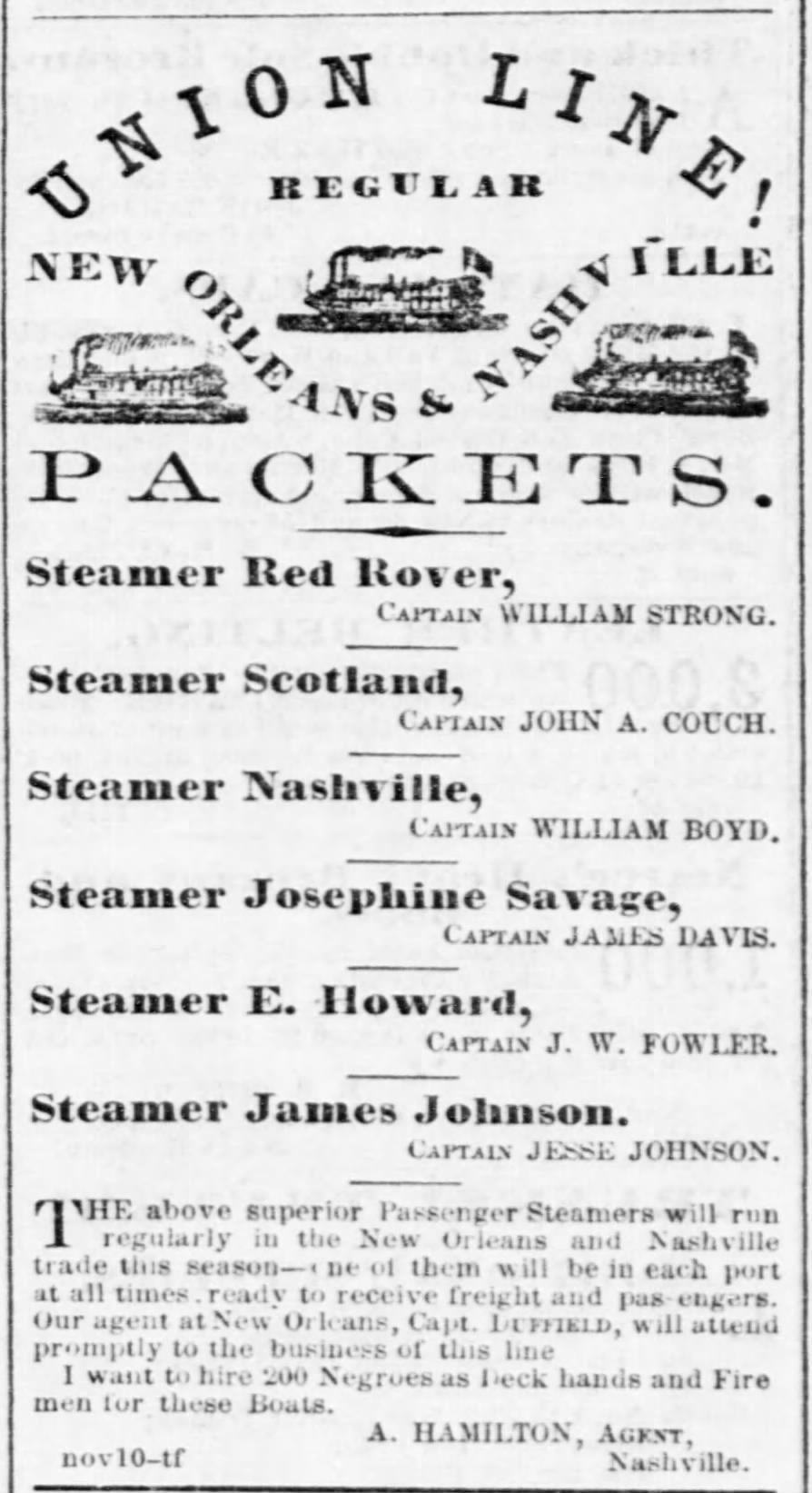
- "Union Line! Regular New Orleans & Nashville Packets" – Steamer Nashville, Captain William Boyd – Daily Nashville Patriot, December 13, 1858
- Born: February 17, 1825; Tennessee, U.S.
- Died: October 31, 1888 (aged 63); Tennessee, U.S.
- Occupation(s): Slave trader, real estate broker, steamboat captain
- Years active: 1853–1883
- Known for: Slave trading, steamboat operations, legal troubles
- Spouse: Susan Boyd

William L. Boyd Jr. (February 17, 1825 – October 31, 1888) was an American slave trader, real estate broker, and steamboat captain from Nashville, Tennessee. Boyd was a prominent figure in the slave trade in Tennessee during the mid-19th century. He was convicted of the murder of his girlfriend in 1883.

== Early life ==
Boyd was born on February 17, 1825, in Tennessee to parents with Virginia and North Carolina origins. He began his career in the early 1850s, initially as a partner in a real estate and slave trading business located on North Cherry Street, Nashville.

== Career ==
The first record of Boyd as slave trader appears in 1853 when he and a partner by the name of Glover "Agents and collectors for the sale and purchase of real estate, negroes, etc., and collectors in the City-Office, 50 N. Cherry St." In 1854 Wm. L. Boyd listed for sale, via city newspaper advertisements, both real estate and "8 or 10 likely negroes." He also placed a listing for himself as a slave dealer in the Southern Business Directory published in Charleston. On the night of March 12, 1855, Albert, Tom, and Mary escaped from Boyd's "yard"; he offered a $30 for their return. In December 1855 he advertised wanting to buy "A WET NURSE, for which I will pay a good price Apply immediately."

In 1857 his stable burned down as a result of an arson fire, believed to have been started by a serial arsonist. In 1860 the offices of the Nashville Democrat newspaper, "devoted to sustaining the principles advocated by Stephen A. Douglas," were located in Boyd's building on Cherry Street. He listed his occupation as "Negro trader" on the 1860 census. His entry in the 1860 Nashville city directory read "Boyd, Wm. L. Jr., general agent and dealer in slaves, 50, north Cherry st., residence, 6, north Cherry st." According to Frederic Bancroft's Slave-Trading in the Old South, Boyd was one of at least half a dozen slave dealers, traders and buying agents working in 1860 Nashville: "Nashville, the capital of Tennessee, and the political, social and business center of the State, was advantageously situated for purchases in Kentucky and sales in northern Alabama and northeastern Mississippi....Much local and intra-state trading was a matter of course. Yet Nashville's market did not rise above the second class. Tennessee's first-class market and phenomenally large traders were in Memphis." Historian Chase C. Mooney noted, "Will Boyd, Jr., was the next most extensive advertiser in Nashville papers, but his notices were not as 'catchy' to the eye as were those of E. S. Hawkins."

Boyd also ventured into the steamboat business, operating vessels like the Nashville and the James Wood along the Cumberland, Ohio, and Mississippi Rivers, extending his influence beyond Tennessee.

== Legal troubles ==
Boyd's life was marked by significant legal issues. In 1861, it was determined in a court of law that Boyd was legally not a resident of Tennessee, possibly due to his steamboat operations and frequent travel.

In 1868, Boyd was involved in a violent altercation where he brandished a gun during a fistfight between his son and another man. His most infamous legal battle occurred in 1883 when he was charged with the murder of his girlfriend, Birdie Patterson. Boyd was convicted twice of second-degree murder and sentenced to 15 years in prison, but both verdicts were overturned on appeal. He died in 1888 while awaiting a third trial and was buried in Mount Olivet Cemetery.

== Personal life ==
Boyd married Susan Boyd, and by 1880, he was listed as retired and living on Summer Street, Nashville. In 1883, he placed an advertisement seeking a lost family Bible, highlighting his interest in preserving family heritage. A family Bible matching his description was later found in a 2009 compilation of Tennessee family records.

== See also ==
- Robert J. Lyles
- List of Tennessee slave traders
- Nashville, Tennessee slave market
- History of Nashville, Tennessee
- Nashville, Tennessee slave market
- History of slavery in Tennessee
