= West Hughes Humphreys =

American judge

West Humphreys
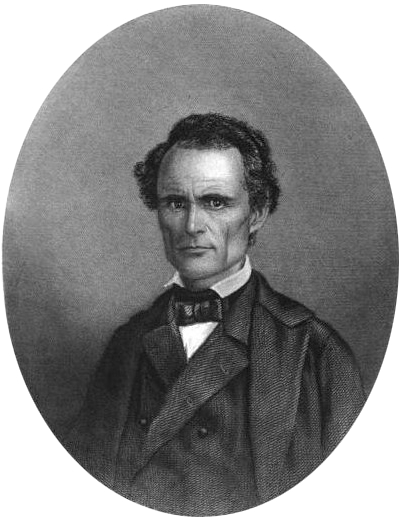

Judge of the United States District Court for the Eastern District of Tennessee Judge of the United States District Court for the Middle District of Tennessee Judge of the United States District Court for the Western District of Tennessee
- In office March 26, 1853 – June 26, 1862
- Appointed by: Franklin Pierce
- Preceded by: Morgan Welles Brown
- Succeeded by: Connally Trigg

3rd Attorney General of Tennessee
- In office 1839–1851
- Governor: James K. Polk; James C. Jones; Aaron V. Brown; Neill S. Brown; William Trousdale
- Preceded by: Return Meigs
- Succeeded by: William Graham Swan

Personal details
- Born: West Hughes Humphreys; August 26, 1806 Montgomery County, Tennessee, U.S.
- Died: October 16, 1882 (aged 76) Nashville, Tennessee, U.S.
- Relatives: Parry Wayne Humphreys (father); John Morton (son-in-law)
- Education: Transylvania University

West Hughes Humphreys (August 26, 1806 – October 16, 1882) was the 3rd attorney general of Tennessee and a United States district judge of the United States District Court for the Eastern District of Tennessee, the United States District Court for the Middle District of Tennessee, and the United States District Court for the Western District of Tennessee.

During the American Civil War, he served as a Confederate judge from 1861 until the end of the war in 1865. He was ultimately impeached by the United States House of Representatives in 1862, being convicted and removed from office by the United States Senate for supporting the Confederate States of America. He was banned from federal service for life.

== Education and career ==
Born on August 26, 1806, in Montgomery County, Tennessee, Humphreys was the son of attorney and judge Parry Wayne Humphreys and his wife Mary West. His father later served on the State Supreme Court, was elected to one term in Congress, and served nearly two decades on the state judicial circuit.

Humphreys was educated privately and attended the law department of Transylvania University. Failing to graduate due to ill health, he read law with an established firm in 1828. He passed the bar and entered private practice in Clarksville, Tennessee from 1828 to 1829.

He moved to Somerville, Tennessee, continuing in private practice from 1829 to 1839. He was elected and served as a member of the Tennessee House of Representatives from 1835 to 1838. He was the 3rd Attorney General of Tennessee from 1839 to 1851. He was reporter for the Tennessee Supreme Court from 1839 to 1851. He resumed private practice in Nashville, Tennessee from 1851 to 1853.

== Federal judicial service ==
Humphreys was nominated by President Franklin Pierce on March 24, 1853, to a joint seat on the United States District Court for the Eastern District of Tennessee, the United States District Court for the Middle District of Tennessee and the United States District Court for the Western District of Tennessee vacated by Judge Morgan Welles Brown. He was confirmed by the United States Senate on March 26, 1853, and received his commission the same day. During the American Civil War, his service terminated on June 26, 1862, due to impeachment, conviction, and removal from office for support of the Confederacy.

=== Impeachment, conviction and removal from office ===
Humphreys served as a Judge of the Confederate District Court for the District of Tennessee from 1861 to 1865.

On May 19, 1862, the United States House of Representatives voted to impeach Humphreys on the following charges: publicly calling for secession; giving aid to an armed rebellion; conspiring with Jefferson Davis; serving as a Confederate judge; confiscating the property of Military Governor Andrew Johnson and United States Supreme Court Justice John Catron; and imprisoning a Union sympathizer with "intent to injure him."

On June 26, 1862, the United States Senate began the trial of the impeachment in his absence and later that day unanimously convicted him of all charges presented, except that of confiscating the property of Andrew Johnson. Humphreys was removed from office and barred from holding office under the United States for life. He held his Confederate judgeship until the end of the Civil War.

== Later career and death ==
Following the end of the American Civil War, Humphreys resumed private practice in Nashville from 1866 to 1882. In later life, Humphreys argued for the prohibition of alcohol and wrote several books. He died on October 16, 1882, in Nashville.

== Family ==
Humphreys' father, Parry Wayne Humphreys, was an attorney, judge who served on the state Supreme Court and nearly two decades in the state judiciary, and one term as United States Representative from Tennessee.

Humphreys was a member of the Methodist Episcopal Church, South. He married and had a daughter, Annie Humphreys, who married John W. Morton, who during the Civil War served as a captain in the Confederate States Army. Afterward, Morton was a founder of the Nashville chapter of the Ku Klux Klan. Reportedly Morton initiated former Confederate general Nathan Bedford Forrest into the KKK.

== Works ==
- Suggestions on the Subject of Bank Charters (1859)
- Some Suggestions on the Subject of Monopolies and Special Charters (1859)
- An Address on the Use of Alcoholic Liquors and the Consequences (1879)

Legal offices
Preceded by Return Meigs	Attorney General of Tennessee; 1839–1851	Succeeded by William Graham Swan
Preceded by Morgan Welles Brown	Judge of the United States District Court for the Eastern District of Tennessee; 1853–1862	Succeeded by Connally Trigg
Preceded by Morgan Welles Brown	Judge of the United States District Court for the Middle District of Tennessee; 1853–1862	Succeeded by Connally Trigg
Preceded by Morgan Welles Brown	Judge of the United States District Court for the Western District of Tennessee; 1853–1862	Succeeded by Connally Trigg
