= Morgan Welles Brown =

American judge (1800–1853)

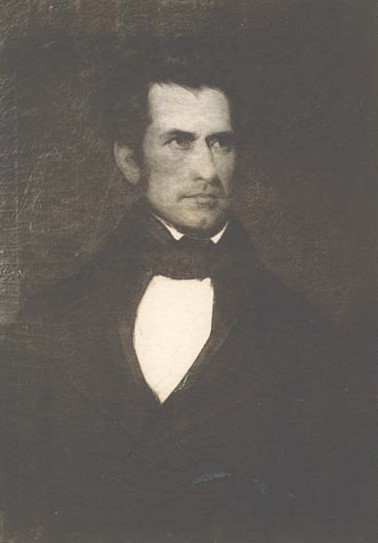

Judge of the United States District Court for the Middle District of Tennessee
- In office June 18, 1839 – March 7, 1853
- Appointed by: operation of law
- Preceded by: Seat established by 5 Stat. 313
- Succeeded by: West Hughes Humphreys

Judge of the United States District Court for the Eastern District of Tennessee Judge of the United States District Court for the Western District of Tennessee
- In office January 3, 1834 – March 7, 1853
- Appointed by: Andrew Jackson
- Preceded by: John McNairy
- Succeeded by: West Hughes Humphreys

Personal details
- Born: Morgan Welles Brown; 1800 Clarksville, Tennessee
- Died: March 7, 1853 (aged 52–53) Nashville, Tennessee
- Resting place: Mount Olivet Cemetery; Nashville, Tennessee
- Education: read law

Morgan Welles Brown (January 1, 1800 – March 7, 1853) was a United States district judge of the United States District Court for the Eastern District of Tennessee, the United States District Court for the Middle District of Tennessee and the United States District Court for the Western District of Tennessee, back when one judge covered all three districts.

== Education and career ==
Born in 1800, in Clarksville, Tennessee, Brown read law c. 1830, in the offices of his brother, William Little Brown, who served as Solicitor General of Tennessee (1814–1822) and as Justice of the Supreme Court of Appeals and Errors (1822 to 1824). He entered private practice in Nashville, Tennessee until 1833. He was editor of the Nashville Republican from 1832 to 1833.

=== Contemporary description ===
Brown was described as a man "of considerable reading and literary tastes, a fine miscellaneous writer . . . and a gentleman of polished manners and high social qualities."

== Federal judicial service ==
Brown was nominated by President Andrew Jackson on December 18, 1833, to a joint seat on the United States District Court for the Eastern District of Tennessee and the United States District Court for the Western District of Tennessee vacated by Judge John McNairy. He was confirmed by the United States Senate on December 31, 1833, and received his commission on January 3, 1834. Brown was assigned by operation of law to additional and concurrent service on the United States District Court for the Middle District of Tennessee on June 18, 1839, to a new seat authorized by 5 Stat. 313. His service terminated on March 7, 1853, due to his death in Nashville. He was interred in Mount Olivet Cemetery in Nashville.

=== Controversy regarding his appointment ===
In nominating Brown, President Jackson ignored the recommendations of the Tennessee Democratic legislative delegation who found Brown unacceptable because "he had edited an anti-Jackson newspaper during the Nullification Crisis." Instead Jackson was influenced by Brown's brother, Justice William Little Brown, as well as State Supreme Court Justice and later United States Supreme Court Justice John Catron and pushed through Brown's appointment.

=== Other service ===
Concurrent with his federal judicial service, Brown served as commissioner to oversee erection of the state capitol in Nashville from 1843 to 1844.

== Family ==
Brown was the son of Morgan Brown, who studied medicine and was called "Dr. Brown" although he seems never to have practiced medicine. His mother was the former Elizabeth Little. His parents were originally from Grassy Island on the Pee Dee River in Anson County, North Carolina. In 1795, they migrated to Tennessee and settled near the Cumberland River where Dr. Brown founded the town of Palmyra, a former community in Montgomery County, which was made a port of entry, the only one at the time west of the Allegheny Mountains. On November 10, 1826, Brown married Ann Maria Childress of Nashville, one of the daughters of U.S. Marshal John Childress, and they had three children; through his wife he was a brother-in-law of Supreme Court Justice John Catron.

Brown was mentioned on Lionel Richie's episode of the American version of Who Do You Think You Are? as the likely biological father of John Lewis Brown, the maternal great-grandfather of Lionel and the founder of African-American fraternal organization Knights of the Wise Men.

== Sources ==
- Green, John W. (1943). "Six Judges of the United States District Court for Tennessee (1797–1908)". Tennessee Law Review. 17 (8.1). Knoxville, Tennessee: University of Tennessee Law School: 889–898.

Legal offices
Preceded by John McNairy	Judge of the United States District Court for the Eastern District of Tennessee; Judge of the United States District Court for the Western District of Tennessee; 1834–1853	Succeeded by West Hughes Humphreys
Preceded by Seat established by 5 Stat. 313	Judge of the United States District Court for the Middle District of Tennessee; 1839–1853	Succeeded by West Hughes Humphreys
