= Connally Trigg =

Connally Trigg may refer to:

- Connally Findlay Trigg (1810–1880), U.S. attorney and federal judge
- Connally Findlay Trigg (1847–1907), U.S. Congressman
