= List of United States Supreme Court cases, volume 57 =

Supreme Court of the United States
- Interactive map of Supreme Court of the United States
- 38°53′26″N 77°00′16″W
- Established: March 4, 1789; 236 years ago
- Location: Washington, D.C.
- Coordinates: 38°53′26″N 77°00′16″W
- Composition method: Presidential nomination with Senate confirmation
- Authorised by: Constitution of the United States, Art. III, § 1
- Judge term length: life tenure, subject to impeachment and removal
- Number of positions: 9 (by statute)
- Website: supremecourt.gov

This is a list of cases reported in volume 57 (16 How.) of United States Reports, decided by the Supreme Court of the United States in 1853 and 1854.

== Nominative reports ==
In 1874, the U.S. government created the United States Reports, and retroactively numbered older privately-published case reports as part of the new series. As a result, cases appearing in volumes 1–90 of U.S. Reports have dual citation forms; one for the volume number of U.S. Reports, and one for the volume number of the reports named for the relevant reporter of decisions (these are called "nominative reports").

=== Benjamin Chew Howard ===
Starting with the 42nd volume of U.S. Reports, the Reporter of Decisions of the Supreme Court of the United States was Benjamin Chew Howard. Howard was Reporter of Decisions from 1843 to 1860, covering volumes 42 through 65 of United States Reports which correspond to volumes 1 through 24 of his Howard's Reports. As such, the dual form of citation to, for example, Steamboat New World v. King is 57 U.S. 469 (16 How.) (1854).

== Justices of the Supreme Court at the time of 57 U.S. (16 How.) ==
The Supreme Court is established by Article III, Section 1 of the Constitution of the United States, which says: "The judicial Power of the United States, shall be vested in one supreme Court . . .". The size of the Court is not specified; the Constitution leaves it to Congress to set the number of justices. Under the Judiciary Act of 1789 Congress originally fixed the number of justices at six (one chief justice and five associate justices). Since 1789 Congress has varied the size of the Court from six to seven, nine, ten, and back to nine justices (always including one chief justice).

When the cases in 57 U.S. (16 How.) were decided the Court comprised these nine members:

Portrait	Justice	Office	Home State	Succeeded	Date confirmed by the Senate (Vote)	Tenure on Supreme Court
	Roger B. Taney	Chief Justice	Maryland	John Marshall	March 15, 1836 (29–15)	March 28, 1836 – October 12, 1864 (Died)
	John McLean	Associate Justice	Ohio	Robert Trimble	March 7, 1829 (Acclamation)	January 11, 1830 – April 4, 1861 (Died)
	James Moore Wayne	Associate Justice	Georgia	William Johnson	January 9, 1835 (Acclamation)	January 14, 1835 – July 5, 1867 (Died)
	John Catron	Associate Justice	Tennessee	newly created seat	March 8, 1837 (28–15)	May 1, 1837 – May 30, 1865 (Died)
	Peter Vivian Daniel	Associate Justice	Virginia	Philip P. Barbour	March 2, 1841 (25–5)	January 10, 1842 – May 31, 1860 (Died)
	Samuel Nelson	Associate Justice	New York	Smith Thompson	February 14, 1845 (Acclamation)	February 27, 1845 – November 28, 1872 (Retired)
	Robert Cooper Grier	Associate Justice	Pennsylvania	Henry Baldwin	August 4, 1846 (Acclamation)	August 10, 1846 – January 31, 1870 (Retired)
	Benjamin Robbins Curtis	Associate Justice	Massachusetts	Levi Woodbury	December 20, 1851 (Acclamation)	October 10, 1851 – September 30, 1857 (Resigned)
	John Archibald Campbell	Associate Justice	Alabama	John McKinley	March 22, 1853 (Acclamation)	April 11, 1853 – April 30, 1861 (Resigned)

== Citation style ==
Under the Judiciary Act of 1789 the federal court structure at the time comprised District Courts, which had general trial jurisdiction; Circuit Courts, which had mixed trial and appellate (from the US District Courts) jurisdiction; and the United States Supreme Court, which had appellate jurisdiction over the federal District and Circuit courts—and for certain issues over state courts. The Supreme Court also had limited original jurisdiction (i.e., in which cases could be filed directly with the Supreme Court without first having been heard by a lower federal or state court). There were one or more federal District Courts and/or Circuit Courts in each state, territory, or other geographical region.

Bluebook citation style is used for case names, citations, and jurisdictions.

- "C.C.D." = United States Circuit Court for the District of . . .
  - e.g.,"C.C.D.N.J." = United States Circuit Court for the District of New Jersey
- "D." = United States District Court for the District of . . .
  - e.g.,"D. Mass." = United States District Court for the District of Massachusetts
- "E." = Eastern; "M." = Middle; "N." = Northern; "S." = Southern; "W." = Western
  - e.g.,"C.C.S.D.N.Y." = United States Circuit Court for the Southern District of New York
  - e.g.,"M.D. Ala." = United States District Court for the Middle District of Alabama
- "Ct. Cl." = United States Court of Claims
- The abbreviation of a state's name alone indicates the highest appellate court in that state's judiciary at the time.
  - e.g.,"Pa." = Supreme Court of Pennsylvania
  - e.g.,"Me." = Supreme Judicial Court of Maine

== List of cases in 57 U.S. (16 How.) ==
Case Name	Page and year	Opinion of the Court	Concurring opinion(s)	Dissenting opinion(s)	Lower Court	Disposition
Lewis v. Darling	1 (1854)	Wayne	none	none	N.D. Ala.	reversed
Turner v. Yates	14 (1854)	Curtis	none	none	C.C.D. Md.	affirmed
Yerger v. Jones	30 (1854)	Grier	none	none	N.D. Ala.	affirmed
Conrad v. Griffey	38 (1854)	McLean	none	none	C.C.E.D. La.	affirmed
Burgess v. Gray	48 (1854)	Taney	none	none	Mo.	affirmed
Pennington v. Gibson	65 (1854)	Daniel	none	none	C.C.D. Md.	affirmed
Fourniquet v. Perkins	82 (1854)	Taney	none	none	C.C.E.D. La.	affirmed
McCabe v. Worthington	86 (1854)	Catron	none	none	Mo.	affirmed
Sizer v. Many	98 (1854)	Taney	none	none	C.C.D. Mass.	dismissed
Piquignot v. Pennsylvania Railroad Company	104 (1854)	Grier	none	none	C.C.W.D. Pa.	affirmed
Robertson v. Coulter	106 (1853)	Taney	none	none	Miss.	dismissed
Chapman ex rel. Leavitt v. Smith	114 (1854)	Nelson	none	none	M.D. Ala.	affirmed
Stafford v. Union Bank	135 (1854)	McLean	Catron	none	D. Tex.	dismissal denied
Davenport v. Fletcher	142 (1854)	McLean	none	none	C.C.E.D. La.	dismissed
Adams v. Law	144 (1854)	McLean	none	none	C.C.D.C.	dismissal denied
Stuart v. Maxwell	150 (1854)	Curtis	none	none	C.C.S.D.N.Y.	affirmed
Cross v. Harrison	164 (1854)	Wayne	none	none	C.C.S.D.N.Y.	affirmed
Chouteau v. Molony	203 (1854)	Wayne	none	none	D. Iowa	affirmed
Denise v Ruggles	242 (1854)	Catron	none	none	C.C.D. Mo.	affirmed
Thorp v. Raymond	247 (1854)	Nelson	none	none	C.C.S.D.N.Y.	affirmed
Maillard v. Lawrence	251 (1854)	Daniel	none	none	C.C.S.D.N.Y.	affirmed
Bartlett v. Kane	263 (1854)	Campbell	none	none	C.C.D. Md.	affirmed
Carroll v. Carroll's Lessee	275 (1854)	Curtis	none	none	C.C.D. Md.	affirmed
Smith v. Swormstedt	288 (1854)	Nelson	none	none	C.C.D. Ohio	reversed
Marshall v. Baltimore and Ohio Railroad Company	314 (1854)	Grier	none	Catron; Daniel	C.C.D. Md.	affirmed
Homer v. Brown	354 (1854)	Wayne	none	none	C.C.D. Mass.	affirmed
State Bank v. Knoop	369 (1854)	McLean	Taney	Catron; Daniel; Campbell	Ohio	reversed
Ohio Life Insurance and Trust Company v. Debolt	416 (1854)	plurality	Taney; Catron; Daniel; Campbell; McLean	Curtis	Ohio	affirmed
Gamache v. Piquignot	451 (1854)	Catron	none	none	Mo.	affirmed
The Steamboat New World	469 (1854)	Curtis	none	Daniel	N.D. Cal.	affirmed
Seymour v. McCormick	480 (1854)	Grier	none	none	C.C.N.D.N.Y.	reversed
Amis v. Myers	492 (1854)	Campbell	none	none	C.C.E.D. La.	reversed
Guitard v. Stoddard	494 (1854)	Campbell	none	none	C.C.D. Mo.	reversed
Irwin v. United States	513 (1854)	Grier	none	none	C.C.W.D. Pa.	affirmed
Fanning v. Gregoire	524 (1854)	McLean	none	none	D. Iowa	affirmed
Barney v. Saunders	535 (1854)	Grier	none	none	C.C.D.C.	multiple
Southard v. Russell	547 (1854)	Nelson	none	none	C.C.D. Ky.	affirmed
Slicer v. Bank of Pittsburg (sic)	571 (1854)	McLean	none	none	C.C.W.D. Pa.	affirmed
Calvert v. Bradley	580 (1854)	Daniel	none	none	C.C.D.C.	affirmed
Early v. Rogers	599 (1854)	Campbell	none	none	W.D. Va.	affirmed
Early v. Doe	610 (1854)	Wayne	none	none	C.C.D.C.	affirmed
Cervantes v. United States	619 (1854)	McLean	none	none	N.D. Cal.	reversed
Deshler v. Dodge	622 (1854)	Nelson	none	Catron; Daniel	C.C.D. Ohio.	reversed
Doe v. Braden	635 (1854)	Taney	none	none	N.D. Fla.	affirmed

== See also ==
- Certificate of division
