= Robert J. Lyles =

American slave trader (1817–1860)

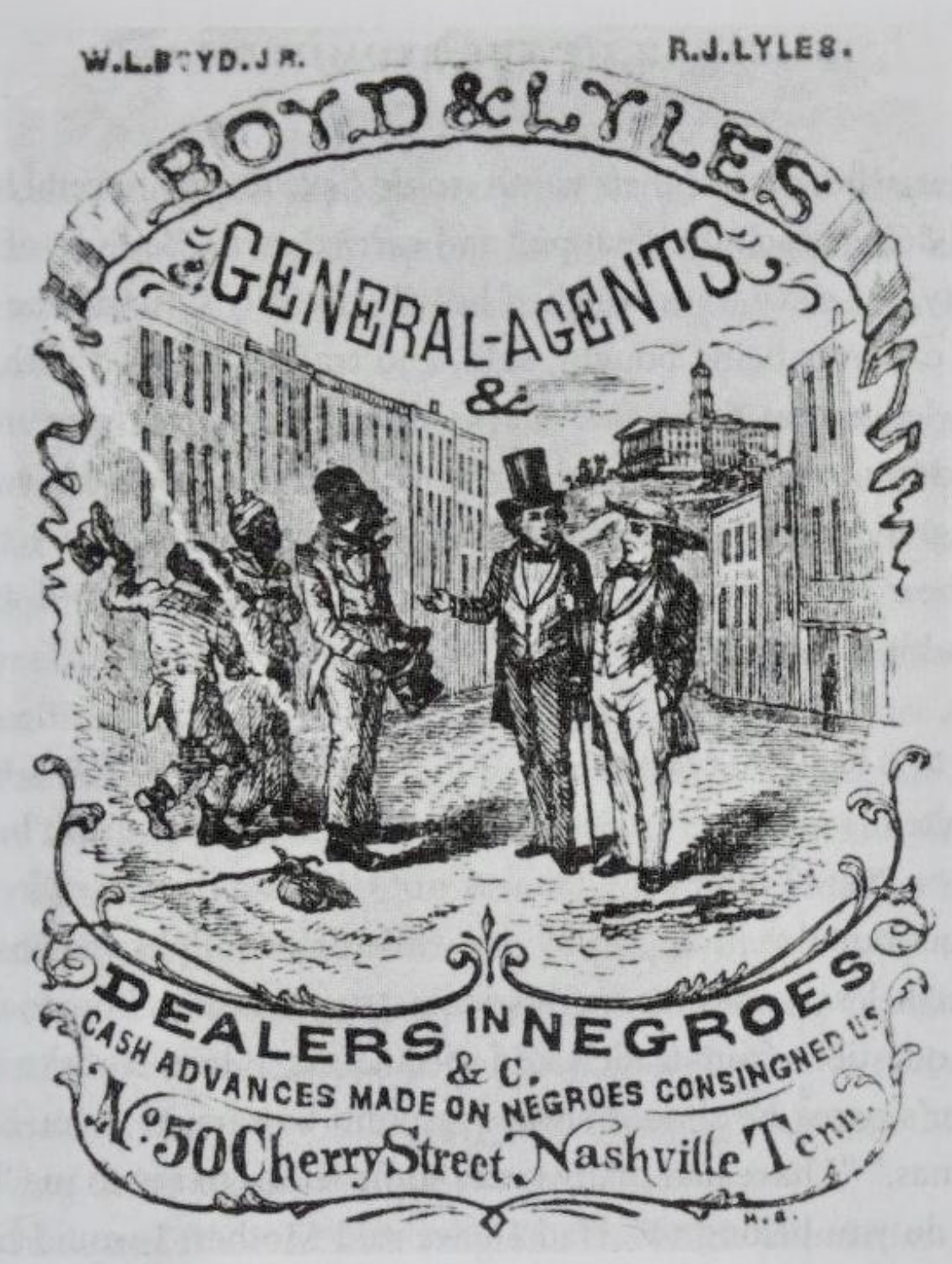
- Born: 1817; Maryland or Tennessee
- Died: May 18, 1860 near Grand Ecore, Louisiana
- Occupation: Slave trader
- Spouse: Mary Roy Hutchison
- Children: 7

Robert J. Lyles (1817 – May 18, 1860) was a slave trader who worked in Nashville, Tennessee, and New Orleans, Louisiana.

== Early life and ancestry ==
Robert J. Lyles was born in 1817 in Maryland or Tennessee to Robert Lyles and Juliet Johnson. His grandfather was doctor Richard Lyles, a surgeon's mate at the hospital in Williamsburg during the Revolution. This makes Lyles a relative of James Breathed, once leader of Jeb Stuart's horse artillery.

== Tennessee ==
Lyles married Mary Roy Hutchison in Sumner County, Tennessee on February 20, 1843. In 1850, Lyles owned ten slaves.

Lyles was first a scout for slave trader Henry H. Haynes at 33 Cedar St., then partnered with George W. Hitchings in 1859. He also sometimes partnered with William L. Boyd Jr. Historian Frederic Bancroft in Slave-Trading in the Old South described Lyles & Hitchings as one of Nashville's "resident leaders in the interstate traffic" in 1859–60.

== New Orleans ==
Lyles bought and sold slaves from the New Orleans market and frequently traveled there. In 1842 he was a passenger on a steamboat that hit a snag while traveling between New Orleans and St. Francisville in Louisiana. In 1847 he was a guest at New Orleans' St. Charles Hotel.

=== Death ===
Upon one such voyage, on the steamer B. L. Hodge, while on the Red River near Grand Ecore, he was stabbed to death by hunchback passenger Bazile L. Sheath. Passenger Charles Fort also died and F. G. Jernigan was wounded severely in the neck. Slave trader Montgomery Little applied in New Orleans for curatorship of the Robert J. Lyles estate. Lyles' son-in-law G. L. Pierce was the administrator of his estate. Lyles is buried in Nashville's Spring Hill Cemetery.

In 1888, more than 30 years after the fact, a Chicago Times reporter writing about the old slave markets in Nashville mentioned Lyles' death but erroneously reported his demise as a gun suicide, writing: "Robert F. Lyles, who was connected with the mart as a trader, committed suicide by shooting himself on a Mississippi river steamer in the year 1856 or 1857. He had delivered a number of slaves in Louisiana and was on his way home when the rash act occurred. The cause of his action was never ascertained."

== See also ==
- List of Tennessee slave traders
- Nashville, Tennessee slave market
- New Orleans slave market
