= Parry Wayne Humphreys =

American judge

Member of the U.S. House of Representatives from Tennessee's 6th district
- In office March 4, 1813 – March 3, 1815
- Preceded by: District created
- Succeeded by: James B. Reynolds

Member of the Tennessee Senate
- In office 1807

Member of the Tennessee House of Representatives
- In office 1805

Personal details
- Born: 1778 Staunton, Virginia
- Died: February 12, 1839 (aged 60–61) Hernando, Mississippi, U.S.
- Party: Democratic-Republican

Parry Wayne Humphreys (1778 – February 12, 1839) was an American attorney, judge, and politician who represented Tennessee in the United States House of Representatives. After serving one term in the House, he later served eighteen years as a judge on the state judicial circuit. About 1836 Humphreys moved to Hernando, Mississippi, where he worked in banking for the remainder of his life.

When established in 1809, Humphreys County, Tennessee was named for the judge. He had served on the Supreme Court of Tennessee from 1807 through 1809.

== Biography ==
Humphreys was born in Staunton, Virginia. As a child, he moved with his family to Kentucky in 1789, part of a westward migration across the Appalachians after the American Revolutionary War. He later settled in Middle Tennessee. After he finished preparatory studies, Humphreys studied law by apprenticing with an established firm (known as "reading the law"). He was admitted to the bar in 1801.

== Career ==
Humphreys opened his practice in Nashville, Tennessee, a major city in Middle Tennessee. He became politically active and was elected to the Tennessee House of Representatives in 1805 and the Tennessee Senate in 1807. He served as a justice of the Supreme Court of Tennessee from 1807 to 1809, and a judge of the State judicial circuit from 1809 to 1813.

Elected as a Democratic-Republican to the Thirteenth Congress, Humphreys served one term from March 4, 1813 to March 3, 1815. In 1817 he was an unsuccessful candidate for the United States Senate.

Following that, he gained another judicial appointment. He served as a judge on the State judicial circuit for nearly two decades, from 1818 to 1836.

Humphreys moved to Hernando, Mississippi. There he engaged in banking until his death.

== Personal life, death and legacy ==
Humphreys married Mary West, and they had a son, West Hughes Humphreys. He served as a judge during the period of the Confederacy.

Parry Wayne Humphreys died on February 12, 1839, at the age of 61. He was interred at Methodist Cemetery. Humphreys County, Tennessee was named for him when it was established in 1809, when he was serving as judge.

His granddaughter Annie Humphreys married John W. Morton. He served as a captain in the Confederate States Army during the Civil War. Afterward, he was a founder of the Nashville chapter of the Ku Klux Klan, which worked to maintain white supremacy over freedmen and their allies. Morton reportedly initiated noted Confederate general Nathan Bedford Forrest into the KKK. Forrest became the Grand Wizard of the organization.

U.S. House of Representatives
Preceded by District created	Member of the U.S. House of Representatives from Tennessee's 6th congressional district 1813–1815	Succeeded by James B. Reynolds
