= John Childress =

U.S. Marshal (d. 1819)

John Childress was a pioneer resident of Nashville, Tennessee with ties to future U.S. president Andrew Jackson. Childress, who served as a United States marshal for 16 years, was remembered as a man of "great wealth" known for his magnificent mansion, Rokeby, later acquired by the father of Adelicia Hayes Franklin Acklen Cheatham.

== Biography ==
Childress served as "entry taker" for Davidson County, Tennessee. In 1803 he and four others, Joel Lewis, George Ridley, Alexander Ewing, and William Luntz, were appointed to raise money and hire contractors for a Davidson County/Mero District Jail.

Childress was appointed the United States Marshal for the United States District Court for the Western District of Tennessee in 1803 and was reappointed, at four-year intervals, serving continuously until his death. In January 1805 he was a signatory to a petition protesting the court-martial of Thomas Butler, probably produced at the behest of Andrew Jackson and sent to Thomas Jefferson's government, recorded in official state papers under the title "Disobedience of Orders Justified on the Grounds of Illegality". In 1805, on the occasion of a duel between Thomas Jefferson Overton (nephew of John Overton) and John Dickinson, Andrew Jackson served as second to Overton and Childress served as second to Dickinson.

Childress' wife was Matilda Robertson, a daughter of either Jonathan Robertson and Dolly Maclin, or militia leader Elijah Robertson (and a niece of Nashville pioneer James Robertson). Childress' offspring included five daughters who were important belles of early Nashville. One of the belles, Matilda Childress, married future U.S. Supreme Court Justice John Catron. Another daughter, Ann Maria Childress, married Morgan Welles Brown, appointed by President Andrew Jackson in 1839 to be judge of the United States District Court for the District of Tennessee. Jane Childress married Sam Marshall, Minerva Childress married Benjamin Litton, Bessie Childress married V. K. Stephenson. One of Childress' sons was George C. Childress, an important pioneer of the Republic of Texas. Son James Childress moved to Arkansas. Another son was John Childress Jr.

Childress died in 1819. He was succeeded as U.S. marshal by Robert Purdy, "lately a Colonel in the Army."

== Sources ==
- Various; Jackson, Andrew (1984). Moser, Harold D.; MacPherson, Sharon (eds.). The Papers of Andrew Jackson, Volume II, 1804–1813. University of Tennessee Press. ISBN 978-0-8704-9441-3.
- Kelley, Sarah Foster (1987). West Nashville: Its People and Environs. Nashville, Tennessee: Douglas Printing, Inc. ISBN 978-0-9615960-0-2. LCCN 87174035. OCLC 17229742.
- Thomas, Jane Henry (1897). Old Days in Nashville, Tennessee. Nashville, Tennessee: Publishing house Methodist Episcopal church, South, Barbee & Smith, agents. hdl:loc.gdc/scd0001.00146133502. LCCN 08018615. OCLC 4159540. OL 140000W.
