= John W. Morton (Tennessee politician) =

American politician

John Watson Morton
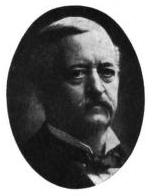
- Born: September 19, 1842; Williamson County, Tennessee, U.S.
- Died: November 21, 1914 (aged 72); Memphis, Tennessee, U.S.
- Resting place: Mount Olivet Cemetery, Nashville, Tennessee, U.S.
- Education: Western Military Institute
- Alma mater: University of Nashville
- Occupation: Farmer
- Political party: Democratic Party
- Spouses: Annie Humphreys; Ellen Bourne Tynes
- Children: 2 sons, 1 daughter
- Parent(s): John A. Morton; Sarah Buchanan
- Relatives: West Hughes Humphreys (1st father-in-law)
- Military career
- Allegiance: Confederate States of America
- Branch: Confederate States Army
- Service years: 1861–1865
- Rank: Captain

John Watson Morton (September 19, 1842 – November 21, 1914) was an American Confederate military officer, farmer and politician. Educated at the Western Military Institute, he entered military service soon after graduation, with the outbreak of war. He served as captain of artillery under General Nathan Bedford Forrest in the Confederate States Army during the American Civil War. Afterward he was the founder of the Nashville chapter of the Ku Klux Klan during the Reconstruction era.

Although Morton studied medicine after the war and practiced as a physician for two years, he decided to go into farming. He led various agricultural societies and served as the Tennessee Secretary of State from 1901 to 1909.

== Early life ==
Morton was born on September 19, 1842, in Williamson County, Tennessee, to Dr John A. Morton and his wife Sarah Buchanan. He had a brother, Thomas P. Morton. The family moved to Nashville, Tennessee, in 1854.

Morton was educated at the private Western Military Institute. At the outset of the American Civil War of 1861-1865, he joined the Rock City Guards, a Nashville militia. He subsequently served as the captain of artillery under General Nathan Bedford Forrest in the Confederate States Army. He was the youngest captain in the Confederate forces. He subsequently wrote a book about his war service.

After the war, Morton studied medicine at the University of Nashville, graduating as valedictorian in 1867.

== Career ==
After the war Morton was the founder of the Nashville chapter of the Ku Klux Klan. Morton initiated former general Nathan Bedford Forrest into the KKK, in Room 10 of the Maxwell House Hotel in fall of 1866.

Morton practiced medicine for two years, until he decided to take up farming in Tennessee. From 1881 to 1901, he served as the editor of Tennessee Farmer, an agrarian journal. He also served as the president of the Tennessee Farmers' Publishing Company.

Morton served as assistant commissioner of agriculture of Tennessee from 1891 to 1896. He assisted with the Tennessee Centennial and International Exposition of 1897, and he subsequently published a book entitled The History of the Tennessee Centennial. He served as the first president of the Tennessee Fruit and Vegetable Growers' Association.

Morton was a member of the Democratic Party. He served as the Tennessee Secretary of State from 1901 to 1909.

== Personal life and death ==
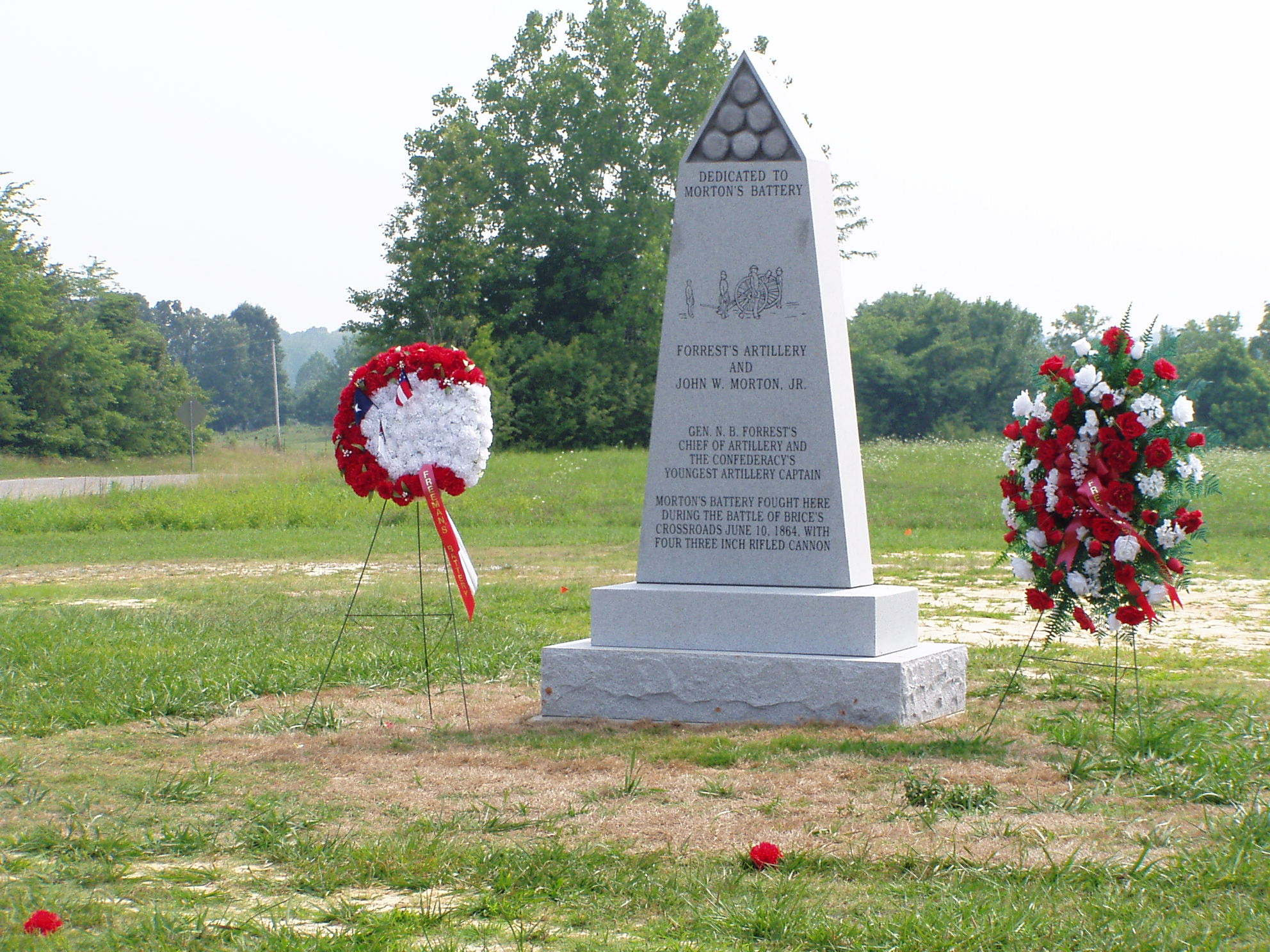
A memorial to Nathan Bedford Forrest and John W. Morton in Brices Cross Roads National Battlefield Site.

Morton was married twice. He first married Annie Humphreys, the daughter of Confederate Judge West Hughes Humphreys and his wife, and granddaughter of Congressman Parry Wayne Humphreys, on September 15, 1868. He married Ellen Bourne Tynes on August 6, 1901. He had two sons, John W. Morton, Jr., an attorney in Nashville, and West H. Morton, the register of Davidson County, Tennessee, and a daughter, Mrs Samuel A. Stout of Memphis. He was a member of the Methodist Episcopal Church, South. He was also a Freemason and an Elk.

Morton died on November 21, 1914, in Memphis, Tennessee. He was buried in his Confederate uniform at the Mount Olivet Cemetery in Nashville, Tennessee.

== Works ==
- Morton, John Watson (1909). The Artillery of Nathan Bedford Forrest's Cavalry, "the Wizard of the Saddle". Nashville, Tennessee: Publishing House of the M.E. church, South. OCLC 1591230.

Political offices
Preceded by William S. Morgan	Secretary of State of Tennessee; 1901–1909	Succeeded by Hallum W. Goodloe
