= History of Nashville, Tennessee =

This article pertains to the history of Nashville, the state capital of Tennessee. What is now Nashville was the center of civilization for the Mississippian culture around 1300. In 1779, Fort Nashborough was built here in 1779 by pioneers from North Carolina. In 1784 it was incorporated as a town by the North Carolina legislature. The Southwest Territory became the state of Tennessee in 1796 and Nashville became an incorporated city in 1806. In 1843 it became the state capital of Tennessee. In the Civil War Nashville was seized by Federal troops in 1862 and became a major Union military base. Confederate General J. B. Hood was decisively defeated in the Battle of Nashville in 1864. The city became the political, transportation, business and cultural center of the Middle Tennessee region. Besides the state government, it is best known for its educational, musical and religious establishments. In 1963 Nashville and Davidson County were consolidated under a single charter and are administered by a mayor and a council.

== Prehistory ==
The first known settlers in the area of modern Nashville were Native Americans who arrived in the region by at least 13,000 BC during the Paleoindian period of regional prehistory. For millennia the descendants of these first Tennesseans continued to live along the river terraces and uplands overlooking the Cumberland River, leaving behind a dense archaeological record spanning the Paleoindian, Archaic, Woodland, and Mississippian periods. The final prehistoric Native American culture to inhabit what would become Nashville was a regional manifestation of the Mississippian culture known as Middle Cumberland Mississippian, identified by archaeologists based on the specific combination of burial practices, artistic style, and ceramic styles. Recent studies suggest that Middle Cumberland Mississippian culture may be the result of interactions between local populations and outsiders from the American Bottom who moved into the western portion of the Nashville Basin around AD 1000, settling at the site of Mound Bottom. The archaeological footprint of the Middle Cumberland Mississippian culture appears throughout Nashville as the many platform mounds, extensive stone box cemeteries, palisaded villages, and small prehistoric farmsteads that have been destroyed by antiquarian scholars, relic hunters, and urban development. All archaeological evidence for Mississippian culture appears to vanish from the Nashville area by around AD 1475–1500. Archaeologists believe this regional collapse may have been the result of extreme pressures brought on by rapid population growth and dwindling resource availability following prolonged droughts leading to increased occurrences of disease, nutritional deficiencies, and warfare.

== Early history ==
There is no reliable historical or archaeological evidence for Native American presence in the Nashville area from 1500 through the late 1600s. The region between the Ohio and Tennessee Rivers was a hunting ground for many tribes, and while the Shawnee occupied the area in the later part of the 17th century, by 1700 they were being challenged by the Cherokee and Chickasaw.

The first Europeans to enter what would become Tennessee were part of the expedition led by Hernando de Soto in the 16th century. Although the exact route of the Desoto expedition is unclear, they do not appear to have reached Middle Tennessee or the Nashville area. Instead, the earliest Europeans in what would become Nashville were French fur traders such as Martin Chartier, who established a trading post in 1689 on the Cumberland River, near the present-day site of the city. Jean du Charleville (aka Charles Charleville) established a trading post in 1710 at a natural sulfur and saline spring near what is now Bicentennial Capitol Mall State Park. The natural salt lick attracted animals, which in turn attracted Native American hunters with whom the French could trade, and the area became known as "French Lick." This same portion of Nashville would later be known as Sulphur Spring Bottom and Sulphur Dell. In 1769, French-Canadian hunter Timothy DeMonbreun began a series of trips up the Cumberland to Nashville and built a cabin near the lick to use as a base of operations for fur trapping during his visits to the area. DeMonbreun settled in Nashville permanently in 1788, and ran a tavern and mercantile business.

== Fort Nashborough ==
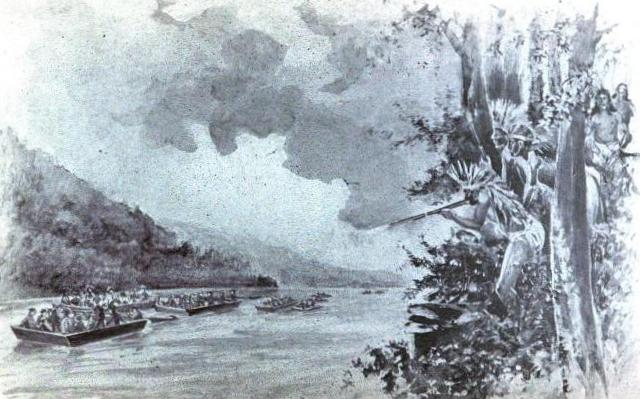
Artist's depiction of Donelson's flatboats descending the Cumberland River in 1784

John Buchanan Sr., born in either Scotland or Ireland, migrated with his family from their home in Cumberland Co., Pennsylvania, to the Watauga Valley, Washington District of North Carolina. Afterward, they took a long horseback trek to Kentucky, left their women and traveled down to the Cumberland Settlements in late 1778, building a station on the southern side of the Cumberland River above the French Lick, on the high ground where Nashville now stands, in the early spring of 1779. His son, Major John Buchanan, known for the siege of Buchanan's Station, is considered to be one of the founders of Nashville, Tennessee. Another settlement arrived when James Robertson left the Watauga settlement in northwestern North Carolina, traveled overland for two months, and arrived on the banks of the Cumberland River near the center of present downtown Nashville on Christmas Day, 1779. They cleared the land and built a log stockade they called the Bluff station. Richard Henderson had planned to call the settlement Nashborough in honor of General Francis Nash, who won acclaim in the American Revolution. For a brief time, court records did use the Nashborough designation but there is no evidence that any of the settlers did. Robertson's friend and fellow Watauga settler John Donelson, along with some 60 families, including women and children, came in 30 flatboats and several pirogues down the Tennessee River and up the Cumberland, arriving April 23, 1780. They founded a new community that was then a part of the state of North Carolina. The town was officially created and named Nashville in 1784, by an act of the North Carolina legislature.

As the northern terminus of the Natchez Trace, the town quickly developed as a cotton center and river port and later as a railroad hub. It soon became the commercial center of the entire Middle Tennessee region. By 1800, the city had 345 residents, including 136 enslaved Blacks and 14 free Blacks.

== Early statehood ==
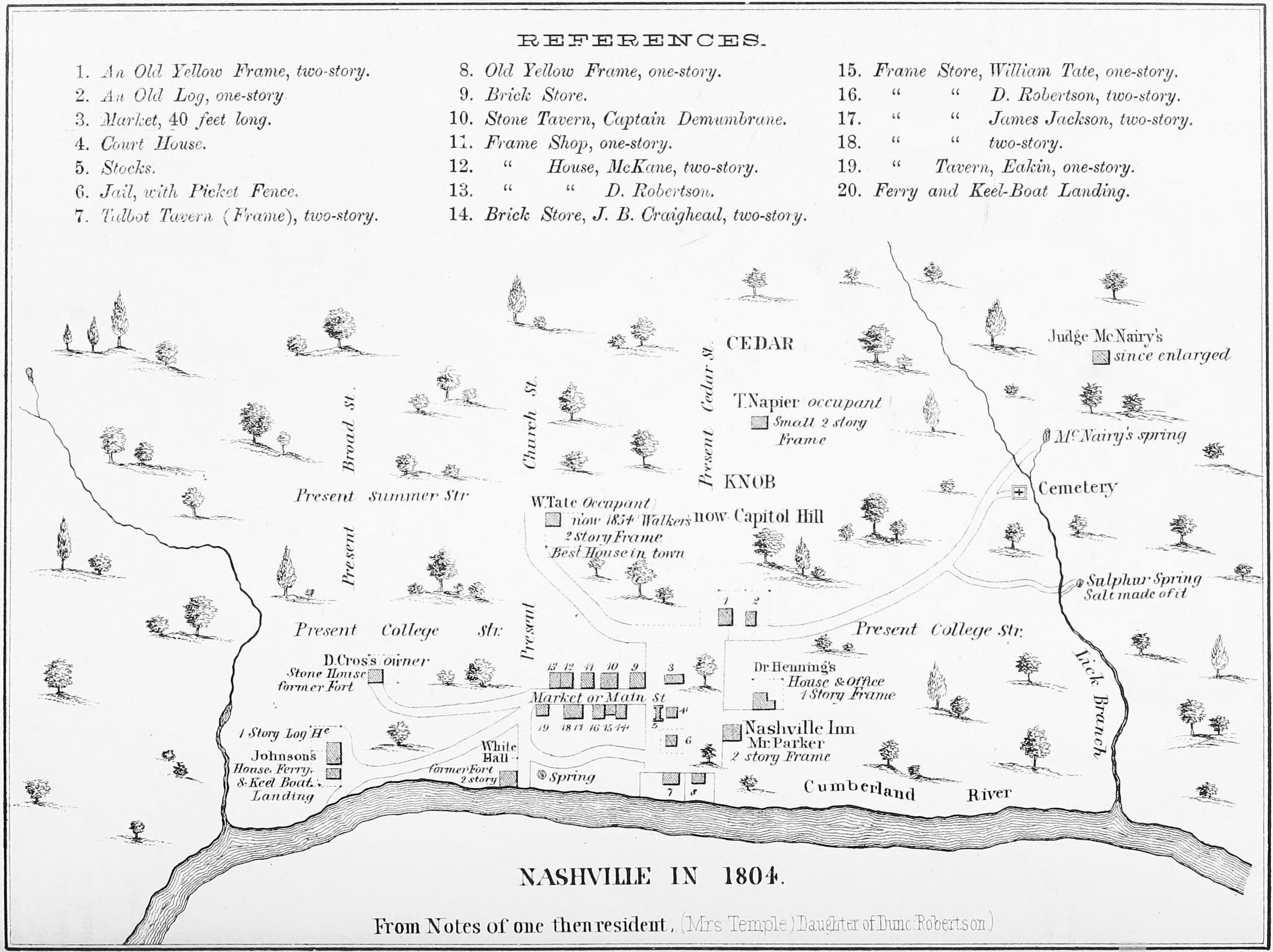
Map of Nashville, Tennessee in 1804, published in 1880

After the failed experiment of the State of Franklin, North Carolina ceded its land from the Allegheny Mountains to the Mississippi River to the federal government. In 1796, that territory was admitted to the union as the state of Tennessee. Nashville at that time was still a small settlement in a vast wilderness, but its central location and status as the state capital made it the political, commercial, financial and religious center of the state.

In 1806, Nashville was chartered as a city. The city's first debt and first large-scale public works project was the building of the Nashville Water Works, centered around the reservoir located on a bluff south of the city, now known as Rolling Mill Hill. The money was loaned by Philadelphia businessmen, and part of the amount was used to purchase around 12 enslaved Black men in Virginia to work on the project. The $50,000 loan was insufficient to cover the $55,000 cost of construction, but the rising value of the slaves purchased by the city covered the difference when all but one or two were sold at the end of the project. Water from the Cumberland River is pumped by steam engine into the reservoir, which remains in use today.

=== Andrew Jackson ===
In the War of 1812, General Andrew Jackson, a Nashville lawyer and politician, defeated the Creek Indians at the Battle of Horseshoe Bend and the British invasion army at the Battle of New Orleans, becoming a national hero, thanks in large part to the fighting skills of the Tennessee militia. Jackson became a western hero, and building on his militia connections, Jackson built a strong political base, and in 1828 Jackson was elected president.

== Capital of Tennessee ==
More than 30 years after receiving its charter, Nashville was selected as the permanent capital of Tennessee on October 7, 1843. Several towns across Tennessee were nominated; all received votes, but Nashville and Charlotte were the top contenders. Nashville won by only one vote. Previously, the cities of Kingston (for one day) and Knoxville in Eastern Tennessee, and Murfreesboro, like Nashville located in Middle Tennessee, had each served as the temporary capital.

The Tennessee State Capitol building was constructed over a period of fourteen years from 1845 to 1859. It was designed by Philadelphia architect William Strickland, who modeled it after a Greek Ionic temple. Commercial, convict, and slave labor were used in the project. Fifteen enslaved Black men worked on carving the Capitol's limestone cellar from 1845 to 1847; Nashville stonemason A.G. Payne was paid $18 a month for their labor. It is believed to be "the most significant project where the [Tennessee] state government rented slave labor." It houses the Tennessee legislature and the Governor's office.

For years Nashville was considered one of the wealthiest southern capitals and a large portion of its prominence was from the iron business. Nashville led the south for iron production.

== Civil War ==
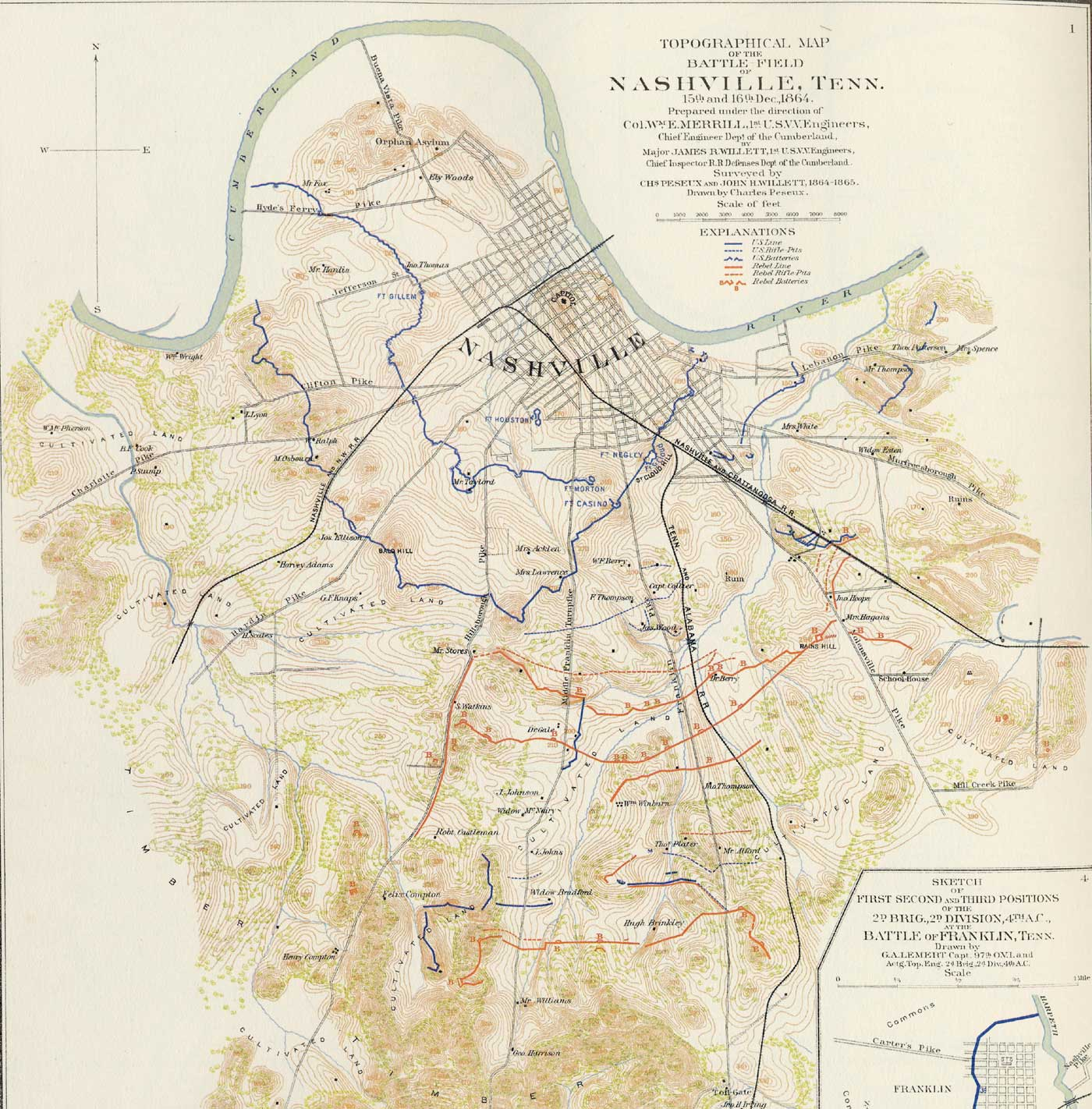
Map of Nashville during the Civil War

Tennessee was the last state to join the Confederacy on June 24, 1861, when Governor Isham G. Harris proclaimed "all connections by the State of Tennessee with the Federal Union dissolved, and that Tennessee is a free, independent government, free from all obligations to or connection with the Federal Government of the United States of America." Nashville was an immediate target of Union forces. The city's significance as a shipping port on the Cumberland River and its symbolic importance as the capital of Tennessee made it a desirable prize.

The General Assembly was in session at Nashville when Fort Donelson fell on February 16, 1862. Soon after at the end of the month, Nashville became the first state capital to fall to Union troops, under the command of Don Carlos Buell. Prior to that, Nashville was evacuated and Governor made a speech recommending the citizens burn their private property; retreating troops destroyed bridges crossing the Cumberland River. Governor Harris issued a call for the legislature to assemble at Memphis, and the executive office was moved to that city. In the meantime, President Lincoln appointed future President Andrew Johnson Military Governor of Tennessee. He set up offices in the capital at Nashville. Confederate uprisings and guerrilla attacks continued sporadically in the city.

On December 2, 1864, the Confederate Army of Tennessee (not to be confused with the rival Union Army of the Tennessee) arrived south of the city and set up fortifications facing the Union Army. After a lengthy stand-off, the Union forces attacked on December 15, starting the Battle of Nashville. The outnumbered Confederate forces were badly defeated and retreated south to the Tennessee River.

Refugees poured into Nashville during the war, because jobs were plentiful in the depots, warehouses and hospitals serving the war effort, and furthermore the city was much safer place than the countryside. Unionists and Confederate sympathizers both flooded in, as did free blacks and escaped slaves, and businessmen from the North. Nashville, with its very large transient population, had flourishing red light districts. Union wartime regulations forced prostitutes to purchase licenses and pass medical exams, primarily to protect soldiers from venereal disease. Their trade was deregulated once military control ended.

A secret Confederate underground operated in the city, smuggling arms, medicines and information to the Confederacy, helping prisoners escape, and giving information to Confederate spies.

== After the Civil War ==
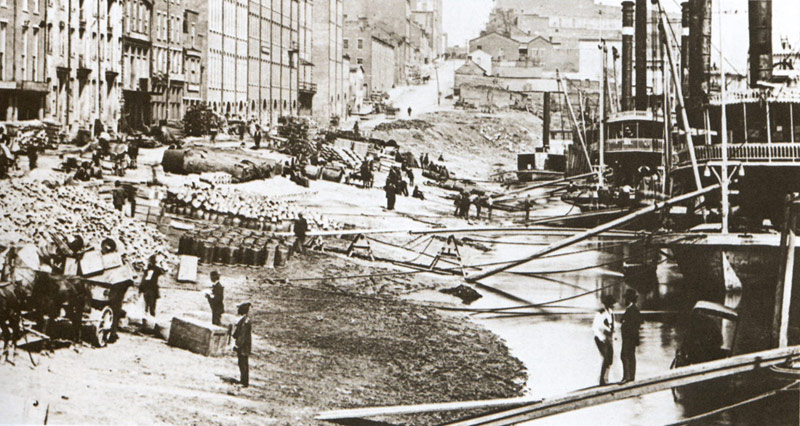
The Nashville Wharf, photographed shortly after the American Civil War

After the Civil War, Nashville quickly grew into an important trade center. Its population rose from 16,988 in 1860 to 80,865 by 1900. African-Americans increased from being 23 to 38 percent of the population between 1860 and 1870. Meanwhile, the Nashville chapter of the Ku Klux Klan was established by Confederate veteran John W. Morton, who initiated General Nathan Bedford Forrest.

When the Union army left, the Fisk Free Colored School took over the Fort Gillem grounds, near where the free blacks lived before the civil war and north of downtown, and was renamed as Fisk University in 1872, it became a leading institution of African-American higher education. A black business district grew up along the fort's wagon road, renamed Jefferson Street. Just across the Cumberland River downtown, several other large African-American districts developed around former camps in East and North Nashville.

In the late 1880s, its African-American and poor white populations were affected by changes to laws by the state legislature, which made voter registration and voting more difficult by requirements including imposition of a poll tax in 1889. The effect was to disenfranchise most blacks and many poor whites, after Tennessee had been one of the most competitive states politically after the Civil War. About one-third of the state's citizens were thus shut out of the political process, a status that lasted for decades, until after passage of legislation during the mid-1960s as a result of the civil rights movement.

In 1897, Nashville hosted the Tennessee Centennial and International Exposition, a World's Fair celebrating the 100th anniversary of Tennessee's entry into the Union. A replica of the Parthenon was built for the event. The Parthenon replica is now the centerpiece of Centennial Park.

An interesting sidenote occurred during the administration of Theodore Roosevelt. President Roosevelt visited Nashville and took his lodging at the Maxwell House Hotel. Joel Cheek, proprietor thereof, had served a special blend of coffee at the hotel's restaurant, and after drinking a cup of this coffee, Roosevelt proclaimed it "good to the last drop!" Cheek subsequently sold the blend to General Foods and to this day, Maxwell House coffee is enjoyed by millions.

In 1913 Nashville was the last of several major cities in Tennessee to adopt a commission form of government, with all members of a small commission elected at-large. Compared to single-member districts, this change resulted in further limiting the political power of any African Americans who were able to vote, as their candidates were unable to gain support by the majority of the city, which was white. Other cities that adopted this form of government in this period were Clarksville in 1907, Chattanooga and Knoxville in 1911, and Jackson in 1915. As a result of legal challenges beginning in the late 1970s, all these cities have adopted new systems, most by 1990. These established council or commissions with more numerous members, most of whom are elected from single-member districts, when enables minorities to elect one or more candidates of their choice.

On March 22, 1916, a fire in East Nashville erupted, destroying more than 500 homes. The fire was exacerbated by unusually high wind gusts, allowing it to spread quickly before firefighters could suppress it. This became known as the Great Fire of 1916. Though there were few injuries and only one fatality, the fire significantly damaged the economy of East Nashville for decades.

The Great train wreck of 1918 occurred on July 9, 1918, in Nashville when an inbound local train collided with an outbound express, killing 101 people. This was one of the most deadly rail accidents in U.S. history.

Tennessee was the state that put the 19th Amendment, allowing women to vote, over the top, and the ratification struggle convulsed the city in August 1920.

On March 1, 1941, W47NV began operations in Nashville, as the first fully licensed commercial FM radio station in the United States.

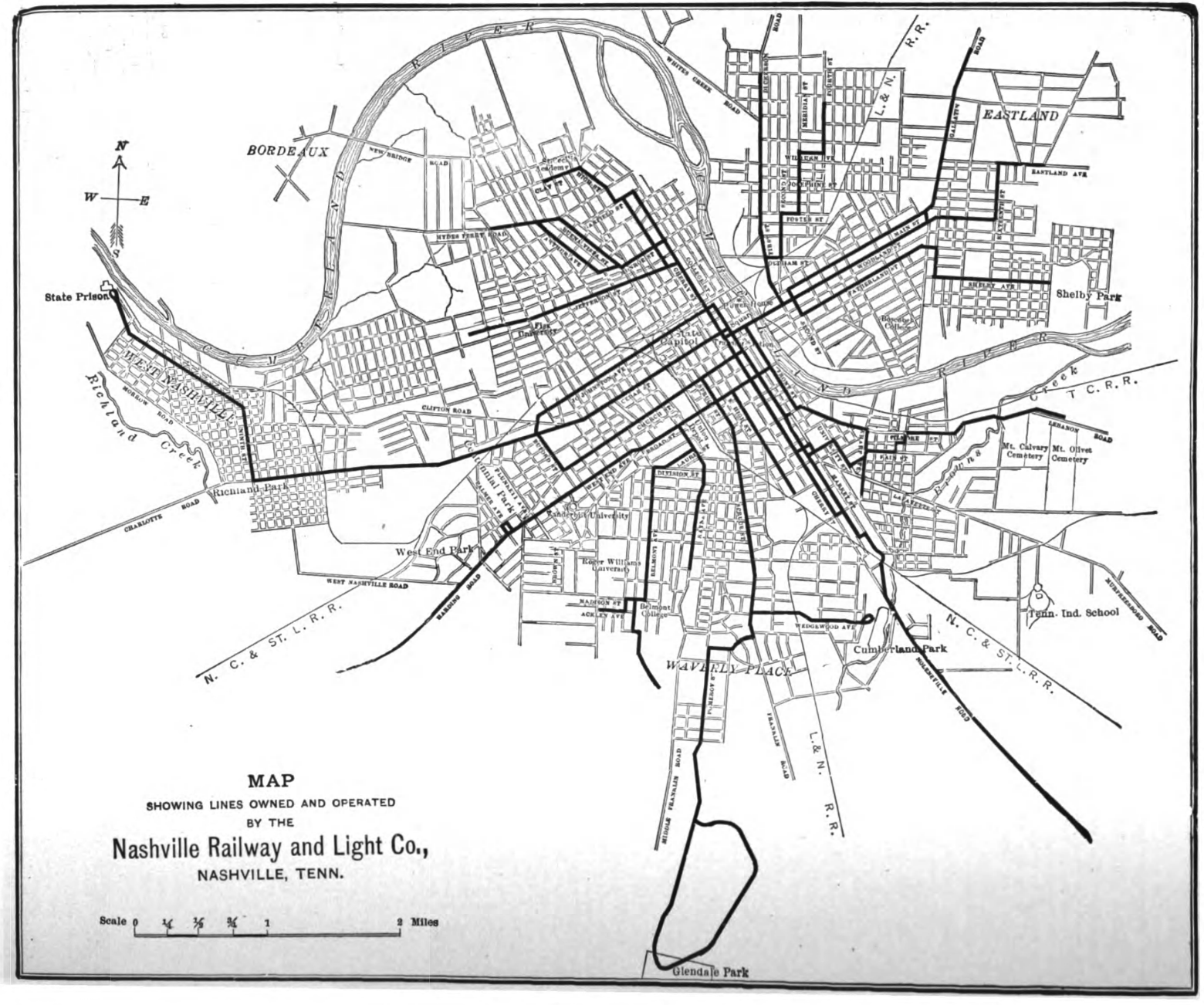
Map Showing Lines Owned and Operated by the Nashville Railway and Light Company c 1912

== Recent history (post-World War II) ==
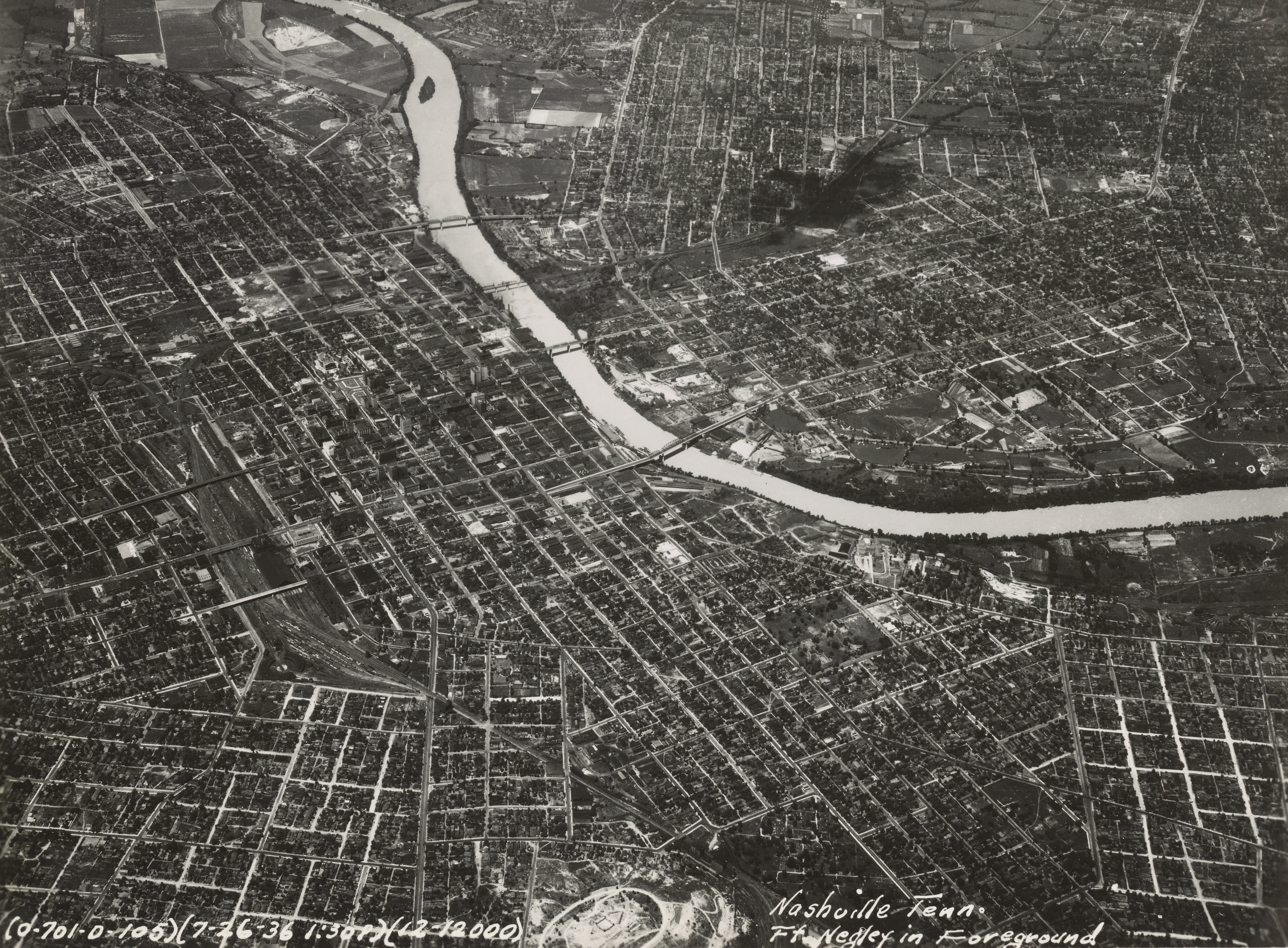
Aerial view of Nashville in 1936

In 1949, the city administration claimed 96 acres in Hell's Half Acre, a black neighborhood northwest of the state capital that housed the poorest African-Americans in the city. The city administration justified it by saying they would rid the city of vice, as the place was then known for saloons, prostitution, and other vices but also housed some of the city's oldest African-American churches and schools. The neighborhood was replaced with the State Library and Archives, a large office building, a six-lane parkway, terraced parking lots and green space, with few provisions for the people who lost their homes.

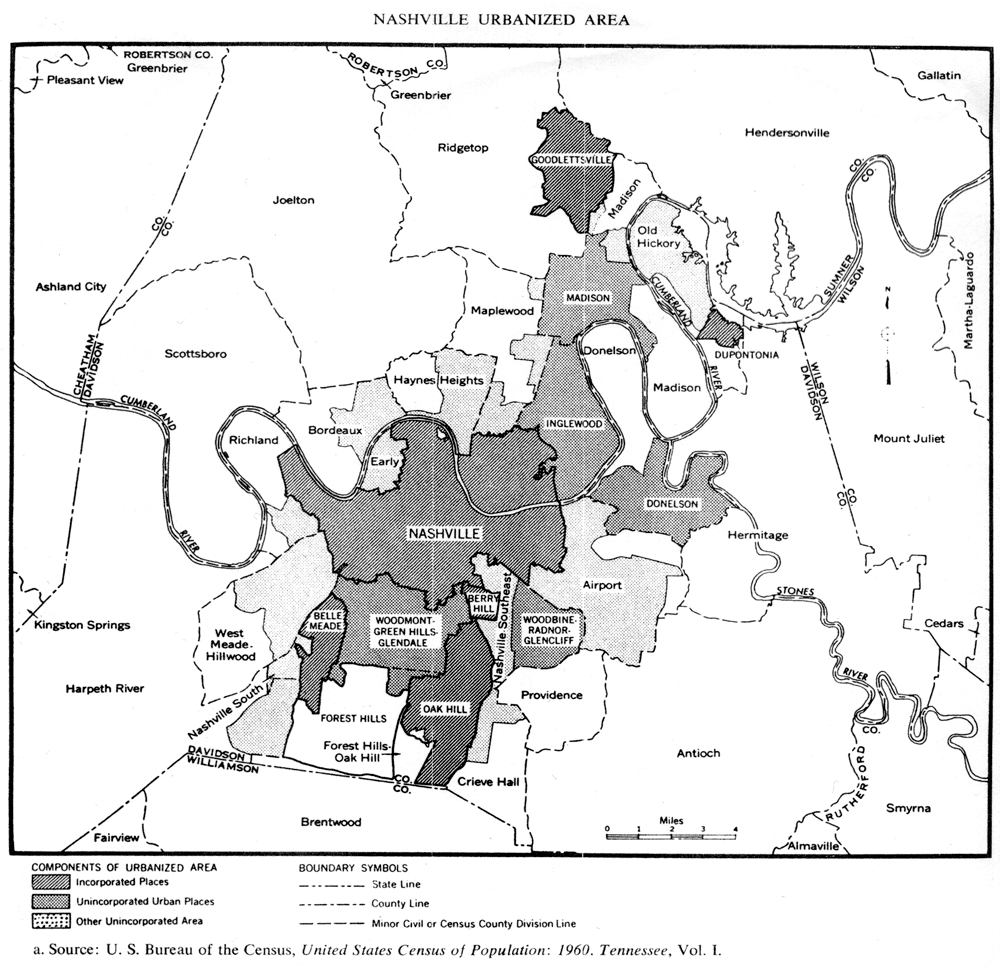
Map of the Nashville area in 1960, prior to consolidation

Music entrepreneurs such as Roy Acuff (1903–1992) made Nashville the country music capital after World War II. Acuff joined the Grand Ole Opry in 1938, and although his popularity as a musician waned in the late 1940s, he remained one of the Opry's key figures and promoters for nearly four decades. In 1942, he co-founded the first major Nashville-based country music publishing company—Acuff-Rose Music. The Second Avenue/lower Broadway district supports a large music industry as well as a musically flavored tourist center.

During the winter of 1951, Nashville experienced the most severe blizzard in the city's history. From Sunday, January 28 to Tuesday, January 30, an ice storm produced an inch of sleet and freezing rain, gridlocking the city and cutting off the power supply to many neighborhoods. On the afternoon of Wednesday, January 31, a blizzard swept through the city with wind gusts in excess of 50 mph and visibility down to zero. Eight inches of snow were recorded, and commute around the city was virtually impossible. On the night of February 2, low temperatures reached -13 degrees Fahrenheit, causing pipelines to burst. Many Nashville residents lacked both electricity and water. Due to the severity of the ice storm and the blizzard that followed afterward, this is known as the worst episode of winter weather in Nashville's history. The blizzard of 1951 holds third place for the most snow recorded in Nashville from a single storm system, behind the blizzard of 1892 and Winter Storm Jonas in 2016.

Nashville was a center of the Civil Rights Movement. In 1957, public schools began to be desegregated using the "stair-step" plan as proposed by Dan May; people protested integration and, at Hattie Cotton Elementary School, a bomb was detonated. No one was killed, and after that the desegregation plan went on without violence. The school board gerrymandered the school districts so that only nine black first-graders enrolled out of about 100 that were eligible. Seven years later, fewer than 800 black students were in formerly all-white schools while black teachers and principals faced demotions or layoffs as the city consolidated the system.

On February 13, 1960, hundreds of college students involved in the Nashville Student Movement launched a sit-in campaign to desegregate lunch counters throughout the city. Inspired by students in Greensboro, North Carolina, students from Fisk, the American Baptist Theological Seminary, and Tennessee A&I had similar sit-in protests and boycotts in Nashville. Although initially met with violence and arrests, the protesters were eventually successful in pressuring local businesses to end the practice of racial segregation. Many of the activists involved in the Nashville sit-ins—including James Bevel, Diane Nash, Bernard Lafayette, John Lewis and others—went on to organize the Student Nonviolent Coordinating Committee, which emerged as one of the most influential organizations of the civil rights movement. The first movement credited to SNCC was the 1961 Nashville Open Theater Movement, directed and strategized by James Bevel, which desegregated the city's theaters.

Inspired by their example, Nashville has had a consolidated city-county government (also known as a "metropolitan government") since 1963. Although a similar proposal had failed in 1958, Davidson County voters approved consolidation in a referendum on June 28, 1962.

On April 16, 1998, an F3 tornado struck the downtown area at around 3:30 p.m., causing serious damage and blowing out hundreds of windows from skyscrapers, raining shattered glass on the streets and closing the business district for nearly four days. Over 300 homes were damaged, and three cranes at the then incomplete Adelphia Coliseum were toppled. Though only one person was killed, it was one of the most costly urban tornadoes on record in the U.S.

The expansion of the National Hockey League brought the Nashville Predators to Nashville in 1998. They currently play at Bridgestone Arena, located in downtown Nashville. The franchise has performed exceptionally well in Nashville, valued at $270 million in 2016.

Shortly after the NHL expansion in 1998, the Tennessee Oilers moved from Memphis to Nashville in 1999, beginning its inaugural season as the Tennessee Titans. In two years, Nashville witnessed the expansion of two professional sports organizations. These franchises tremendously invigorated the revitalization of the downtown area.

In 2000, Nashville native Bill Frist rose to national political prominence when he became majority leader of the U.S. Senate. Frist was formerly a transplant surgeon at the Vanderbilt University Medical Center.

In 2006, commuter rail service from Nashville to Lebanon opened to the public. Further plans to expand the Music City Star (now known as the WeGo Star) were halted during the Great Recession of 2008–09; however, plans to expand commuter rail service are once again an objective for the city.

On April 30 through May 7, 2010, significant flooding impacted Nashville and its suburbs. Many areas in the Nashville MSA received more than 18 inches of rainfall in less than 48 hours. This caused significant damage to the downtown area, and three dozen lives were lost in the city. Due to the rarity of the amount of rainfall, meteorologists dubbed it a "thousand year event."

On January 22, 2016, Winter Storm Jonas brought blizzard conditions to Nashville, producing more than eight inches of snow. The National Weather Service issued a blizzard warning that morning. On January 22, Nashville set a record for snowfall received in a 24-hour period. The blizzard proceeded to the East Coast by January 23.

In 2016, Nashville experienced a growth of 82 residents per day. In 2017, Nashville surpassed Memphis as Tennessee's most populous city. Despite the Great Recession, Nashville has posted strong economic growth during the 21st Century and boasts one of the lowest unemployment rates in Tennessee.

From April 25–27, 2019, Nashville hosted the 2019 NFL draft. It broke draft attendance records with 600,000 people attending and is currently the most watched draft in NFL history with 47.5 million TV views.

In the early hours of March 3, 2020, Nashville was once again struck by a deadly tornado. This high-end EF-3 tornado killed two people in East Nashville and continued on into Wilson County where it killed an additional three people.

On December 9, 2023, a violent storm with multiple tornadoes left a line of destruction some hundred miles long through the area around Nashville. Especially hard hit was the Madison neighborhood of Nashville, in which three people were killed. Property damage was extensive.

== Recent economic development ==
On January 8, 2013, The New York Times declared Nashville "It" city in a publication titled "Nashville's Latest Hit Could Be the City Itself". This article is widely thought to have spurred new growth and construction in Nashville, ultimately leading to Nashville being declared the 5th fastest growing city in America by the end of 2013.

On May 28, 2013, the newly anticipated Music City Center opened its doors in the SoBro District of Downtown Nashville. This new convention center marked a major milestone by replacing the rapidly aging Nashville Convention Center, and also adding an 800-room Omni Hotel along with an expansion of the Country Music Hall of Fame's facilities. This construction project sparked a number of new construction projects in both the SoBro district and other parts of the city, and has continued to spur development up into 2015.

In November 2014, Bridgestone announced that they would be keeping their North American Headquarters in Nashville, and would invest $200 million to build a new 35 story skyscraper that would bring 1,700 jobs to downtown Nashville.

On January 26, 2015, Google announced that it was bringing its Fiber service to the Nashville Area, bringing with it super fast internet using fiber optic cables in the ground. This announcement was seen as a major plus for the up-and-coming tech scene in Nashville, along with other companies that either have a presence here or looking to relocate to the Nashville Area.

On April 17, 2015 First Tennessee Park opened in the Germantown district of Nashville, which provided a new home for the AAA Baseball team the Nashville Sounds.

As a whole, at least 123 projects are planned for or under construction in Davidson County, many of which have begun recently. In downtown alone, developments consist of a 27-story Westin Hotel under construction in the SoBro district, a 33-story residential apartment complex named "The Sobro", a 35-story JW Marriott is proposed across from the Music City Center, HCA's new 18 story headquarters along with a $1 billion development named Capitol View are both under construction in the North Gulch area, and a 44-story condo and apartment building named 505 cst is proposed for the downtown core which, if built, will be the tallest building in Nashville.

oneC1TY is an urban community under construction near the Charlotte Ave and 28/31st connector intersection. It will serve as a center of technology-enabled commercial, residential, research and retail activity. Its sustainable design features green space, and a community lawn will encourage walking, biking and enjoyment of the outdoors, music and art.

Nashville became the largest city in Tennessee in 2017, surpassing Memphis by a total of roughly 8,000 people.

Zillow ranked Nashville the hottest housing market in the entire United States in 2017, Milken Institute ranked Nashville as the 7th best performing city in the United States based on economic, social and communal factors on a local and national scale.

In August 2017 British Airways announced the launch of the first nonstop transatlantic flight on their airline from Nashville to London's Heathrow Airport, beginning on May 4, 2018. The flight is expected to contribute $100 million to Nashville's economy and promote business connections and leisure travel to the city.

In May 2018, The New York financial firm AllianceBernstein announced it would relocate its corporate headquarters to downtown Nashville in the Fifth and Broadway development, bringing at least 1000 new corporate jobs. Shortly after in June 2018 Nashville was named the host of the 2019 NFL draft.

On November 12, 2018, Nashville was announced as the East coast operations hub for Amazon's logistics and retail department, bringing at least 5000 new corporate jobs downtown to the Nashville Yards development and becoming the largest jobs announcement in the history of the state of Tennessee. Ernst & Young announced it would be opening a tech hub on Nashville's Music Row, bringing a further 600 jobs to the Nashville region.

On December 25, 2020, a car bomb exploded in downtown Nashville at the city's business district, outside the AT&T Building, injuring at least three people. Initial reports suggested that at least one building had collapsed. Officials believe the explosion was an "intentional act". The explosion was felt "miles" away from the blast site.

On March 27, 2023, a mass shooting occurred at The Covenant School in Nashville's Green Hills neighborhood, killing three adults, three children, and the perpetrator.

== See also ==
- Timeline of Nashville, Tennessee
