= G. L. Pierce =

- Born: November 18, 1835; Tennessee
- Died: October 2, 1882 (aged 46); Sumner County, Tennessee
- Occupations: Slave trader, stock trader
- Spouse: Nancy Lyles
- Children: 7

G. L. Pierce
- Military career
- Allegiance: Confederate States of America
- Branch: Confederate States Army
- Service years: 1861
- Rank: Private
- Unit: 7th Tennessee Infantry
- Conflicts: American Civil War

Granville Lafayette Pierce (November 18, 1835 – October 2, 1882) was a slave trader and stock trader in Nashville, Tennessee. Pierce was born in Tennessee on November 18, 1835, to Isaac Pierce III and Mary Lyles. The Pierces traveled from Fayette County, Pennsylvania, to Sumner County, Tennessee, c. 1790.

During the Civil War, Pierce fought with the 7th Tennessee Infantry, but was given sick furlough on September 9, 1861, and reported deserted on December 14. He married Nancy, the daughter of slave trader Robert J. Lyles, in Sumner County, Tennessee on November 25, 1863. He was the administrator of Lyles' estate. Pierce's son-in-law was Samuel W. Meek, assistant treasurer for the New York Times.
