= John Catron =

US Supreme Court justice from 1837 to 1865

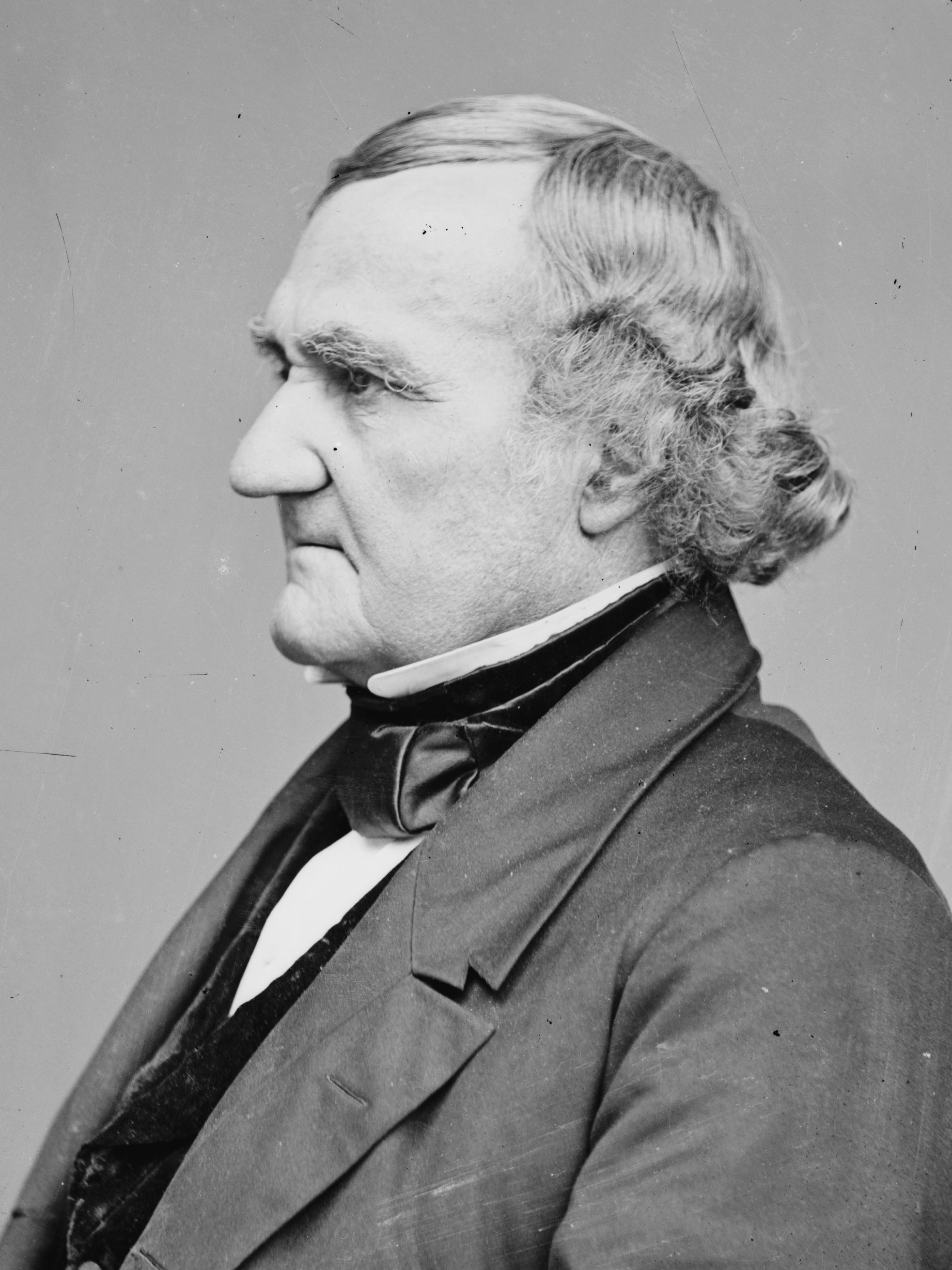
- Catron, c. 1855–1865

Associate Justice of the Supreme Court of the United States
- In office May 1, 1837 – May 30, 1865
- Nominated by: Andrew Jackson
- Appointed by: Martin Van Buren
- Preceded by: Seat established
- Succeeded by: Seat abolished

Personal details
- Born: January 7, 1786 Pennsylvania, U.S.
- Died: May 30, 1865 (aged 79) Nashville, Tennessee, U.S.
- Party: Democratic
- Spouse: Matilda Childress

Military service
- Allegiance: United States
- Branch/service: United States Army
- Battles/wars: War of 1812: Alabama Campaigns; Creek War; Battle of Talladega; Battle of Tallushatchee; Fort Strother; Battle of New Orleans

John Catron (January 7, 1786 – May 30, 1865) was an American jurist who served as an associate justice of the Supreme Court of the United States from 1837 to 1865, during the Taney Court.

== Early and family life ==
Little is known of Catron's early life, other than that all of his grandparents emigrated from Germany to Virginia, as part of the extensive emigration of Swiss and Germans from Hesse and the Palatinate due to wars, and economic and religious insecurity in the area. His father, Peter (Catron) Kettering, immigrated as a child with his parents from Mittelbrun in the German Palatinate and settled in Montgomery County (later Wythe County), Virginia. His mother, Maria Elizabetha Houck, was the daughter of immigrants from the Palatinate who settled in Virginia by way of Pennsylvania.

Catron's only sibling, Mary, married Thomas Swift and eventually moved west to Missouri and then Oregon. He was also a second cousin of Thomas Benton Catron, one of New Mexico's first U.S. Senators. Catron's father, Peter Catron, served in Captain William Doack's militia company from Montgomery County during the Revolutionary War. The family relocated to Kentucky in the early 19th century.

== Military service ==
When the War of 1812 broke out, Catron enlisted in the United States Army. He was sent south to participate in the Natchez Expedition and served under General Andrew Jackson in the Alabama campaigns during the Creek War. Catron saw action in notable engagements, including the Battle of Talladega, the Battle of Tallushatchee, and Fort Strother. According to some accounts, he also participated in the Battle of New Orleans.

Catron's military service was cut short when he was granted a release from the Army due to illness. Despite his brief time in the military, his service earned him the respect of influential figures, including Andrew Jackson and Attorney General Isaac Thomas. These relationships would prove significant in his later career.

== Law career and personal life ==
After leaving the military, Catron returned to Sparta, Tennessee, where he read law and was admitted to the Tennessee bar in 1815. He began practicing law in the Cumberland Mountains of Sparta and later established a land-law practice in Nashville in 1818. Catron was appointed prosecuting attorney for Sparta and, from 1824 to 1834, served on the Tennessee Supreme Court of Errors and Appeals, eventually becoming its Chief Justice in 1831. He retired in 1834 after the Tennessee state legislature abolished the chief-justice position. He returned to private practice in Nashville. During the election of 1836, Catron directed Martin Van Buren's presidential campaign in Tennessee against native son Hugh Lawson White.

Catron married Matilda Childress, daughter of U.S. Marshal for western Tennessee, John Childress. Matilda Childress was the sister of George C. Childress, a political leader of the Texas Republic and chair of the committee that drafted the Constitution of the Republic of Texas. John and Matilda Catron had no children.

A lifelong slaveholder, Catron had a relationship with Sally Thomas, an enslaved woman in Tennessee who operated a laundry in Nashville. Catron fathered her third mixed-race son, James P. Thomas, who was born into slavery. Although Catron only gave Thomas 25 cents in his lifetime, Sally effectively secured her son's freedom when James was six. James later built a successful business as a barber in Nashville, gained manumission permission from the Tennessee legislature to stay in the state in 1851 due to his achievements, and eventually owned property in St. Louis valued at $250,000. Thomas was Catron's only known child.

== Supreme Court tenure ==
The number of seats on the Supreme Court was expanded from seven to nine in 1837, as a result of the Eighth and Ninth Circuits Act. This allowed President Andrew Jackson the opportunity to appoint two new justices, which he did on March 3, 1837, his last full day in office. The newly seated Senate of the 25th Congress confirmed Catron's nomination five days later by a vote of 28–15. The nominee for the other seat, William Smith, was also confirmed, but he subsequently declined to serve. Catron took the judicial oath on May 1, 1837, and served for 28 years, until his death in May 1865.

Catron supported slavery and sided with the majority in the Dred Scott v. Sandford case (exchanging letters with president-elect James Buchanan in February 1857). However, he opposed secession and urged Tennessee to remain with the Union. For a brief time after Tennessee seceded from the Union but prior to Nashville being occupied by Federal troops, Catron left his residence in Nashville and temporarily lived in Louisville, Kentucky.

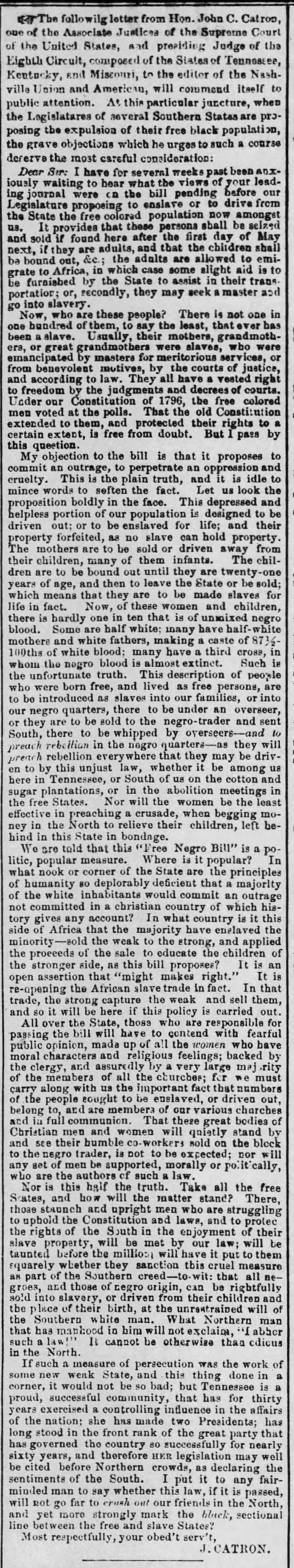
Some thoughts on freedom and slavery, from Justice Catron (Courier-Journal, Louisville, Ky., Dec. 13, 1859)

While he wrote few opinions, it is still possible to decipher his stance on certain political issues and determine his importance to the court. John Catron's political views primarily coincided with the views of his fellow Tennessean Andrew Jackson. Just as Jackson opposed the idea of the national bank, Catron also became an outspoken critic of the national bank. This view coincides with his political view on corporations. While Catron ultimately believed that corporate power could threaten the livelihoods of American citizens, his views were not always this way. During his early years on the Court, particularly in the case of Bank of Augusta v. Earle (1839), Catron actually concurred with the majority and agreed with the idea that corporations had the ability to conduct business nationwide. The Justices ruled in Bank of Augusta that a state could exclude a foreign corporation from doing business within that state, but, that the state would have to do so explicitly.

Catron's overpowering anti-corporate views were more evident in Piqua Branch of the State Bank of Ohio v. Knoop, 57 U.S. 369 (1854). This case raised the issue of whether or not a corporate charter constituted a contract between the state and the bank and therefore could not be repealed due to the Contract Clause in Article 1, Section 10 of the Constitution. The Piqua Branch of the State Bank of Ohio's original charter granted an exemption from state taxation. However, a new legislature was attempting to repeal this exemption and impose a tax on the bank. The majority of the Court ruled in favor of the charter, citing the Contract clause. John Catron, along with Justices Campbell and Daniel, however, dissented. In his dissent, Catron argued, "The sovereign political power is not the subject of contract so as to be vested in an irrepealable charter of incorporation, and taken away from, and placed beyond the reach of, future legislatures." With this statement, Catron argued against the power of corporations and for the power of the federal government. Catron made the stance that political power was not only sovereign but that it also was not to be overruled by a contract, especially a corporate charter. Essentially Catron argued that in this case, corporate power exceeded federal power. Because John Catron was a Jacksonian, he felt the American Union should always be the most powerful entity within the United States and therefore dissented in this case which he saw as granting more power to corporations than to the federal government. Catron argued that because of this ruling, corporations could overrule the government as long as a contract was present. Another case that exemplified Catron's anti-corporation views was the case of Ohio Life Insurance and Trust Co. v. DeBolt, 57 U.S. 416 (1853). This case primarily dealt with the power to tax corporations, but took on bigger-picture questions such as the role of corporations in American society and whether they had begun to possess more power than the states had originally granted them. Catron again dissented from the majority and re-stated his Jacksonian beliefs when he voiced his concern about "the vast amount of property, power, and exclusive benefits, prejudicial to other classes of society that are vested in and held by these numerous bodies of associated wealth." Catron also stated "that a different doctrine would tend to sap and eventually might destroy the state constitutions and governments" in his dissent when referring to the power that corporate charters and contracts could have over the United States government.

Despite Catron's opinion in the Dred Scott v. Sandford case and his pro-slavery stance, Catron resented the secession of his home state of Tennessee because he felt the American Union should be preserved at all costs, a reflection of his Jacksonian views. Following President Abraham Lincoln's inauguration, Catron left to "ride circuit" in the states of Missouri, Tennessee, and Kentucky. However, when Catron attempted to return to Nashville to perform his circuit duties, he was told that his very life could be in danger due to his views. Catron was forced to flee the state of Tennessee and reside permanently in Louisville, Kentucky, away from his wife and friends, who sympathized with the Confederacy. Catron's stance on the southern rebels was to "punish treason and will." This belief was present in his ruling in United States v. Republican Banner Officers (C.C.D. Tenn. 1863). This case raised the issue of whether non-personal property could be confiscated due to the federal Confiscation Act of 1861. The Republican Banner was a newspaper that at the time, was spreading very anti-Union and pro-Confederacy propaganda throughout the South. The employees of the Banner argued that because the newspaper was not a personal property, it could not be confiscated. In this case, Catron ruled that the Act authorized the confiscation. Catron argued that when, "there being then a formidable rebellion in progress, the intention of Congress in enacting this law must have been to deter persons from so using and employing their property as to aid and promote the insurrection.". Even to the end of his legal and judicial career, Catron held fast to his protection of the rights of states and his stance on preserving the Union whatever the cost.

== Death ==
Catron died on May 30, 1865, at the age of 79. He is interred at Nashville's Mount Olivet Cemetery. He was the last remaining federal judge on the bench appointed by President Van Buren.

After Catron's death, Congress eliminated his seat from the Court under the Judicial Circuits Act of 1866 as a way to prevent President Andrew Johnson from appointing any justices. Catron is the only Supreme Court judge to neither replace someone nor be replaced (he was appointed due to an expansion of the Court and his seat was abolished following his death).

== Legacy and honors ==
John Catron was an outspoken critic of the national bank, an advocate for federal power over corporate power, and a pro-Union, pro-slavery supporter. Many of his beliefs stemmed from the beliefs of his friend and battlefield leader, Andrew Jackson. Catron fought against corporations of accumulated wealth and privilege and for the rights of citizens. He remained true to his pro-slavery stance in the most important case the Supreme Court had ever seen until that point, Dred Scott v. Sandford. Despite his pro-slavery stance, Catron was a strong advocate for the Union and remained steadfast to this view, even leaving his wife and friends to help in the preservation of the United States. Ultimately, John Catron's most important contribution to the Supreme Court of the United States was his loyalty to the Constitution and his undying support of the Federal Union, despite the political costs.

During World War II the Liberty ship SS John Catron was built in Brunswick, Georgia, and named in his honor.

== See also ==
- List of justices of the Supreme Court of the United States
- List of United States federal judges by longevity of service

Legal offices
| New seat | Associate Justice of the Supreme Court of the United States; 1837–1865 | Seat abolished |
