= Connally Findlay Trigg (judge) =

American judge

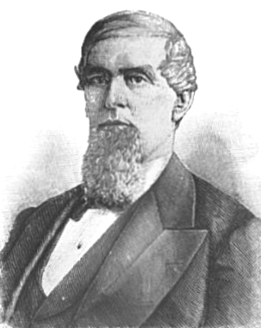

Judge of the United States District Court for the Eastern District of Tennessee Judge of the United States District Court for the Middle District of Tennessee
- In office July 17, 1862 – April 25, 1880
- Appointed by: Abraham Lincoln
- Preceded by: West Hughes Humphreys
- Succeeded by: David M. Key

Judge of the United States District Court for the Western District of Tennessee
- In office July 17, 1862 – June 14, 1878
- Appointed by: Abraham Lincoln
- Preceded by: West Hughes Humphreys
- Succeeded by: Seat abolished

Personal details
- Born: Connally Findlay Trigg; March 8, 1810 Abingdon, Virginia
- Died: April 25, 1880 (aged 70) Sullivan County, Tennessee
- Education: read law

Connally Findlay Trigg (March 8, 1810 – April 25, 1880) was a United States district judge of the United States District Court for the Eastern District of Tennessee, the United States District Court for the Middle District of Tennessee and the United States District Court for the Western District of Tennessee.

== Education and career ==
Born on March 8, 1810, in Abingdon, Virginia, Trigg read law in 1833. He entered private practice in Abingdon until 1856. He was a town councilman for Abingdon starting in 1835. He was clerk of the Washington County, Virginia Court from 1838 to 1852. Trigg was elected to the Virginia Constitutional Convention of 1850, one of four chosen for the delegate district including his home Washington County and Smyth and Wythe Counties. A Whig, he ran for the United States House of Representatives in 1855, but was defeated by the Democratic incumbent, Fayette McMullen. He continued private practice in Knoxville, Tennessee from 1856 to 1861. From 1856 to 1861, he was in partnership with Oliver Perry Temple.

== Unionist ==
Trigg largely avoided Knoxville politics until the secession crisis intensified in the weeks following the election of President Abraham Lincoln. During this crisis, Trigg remained a steadfast supporter of the Union. In February 1861, he was one of Knox County's pro-Union candidates for the proposed statewide secession convention (voters ultimately rejected holding the convention). In May and June 1861, he was one of Knox's delegates to the Unionist East Tennessee Convention. He served as chairman of the convention's business committee, which was tasked with drafting a set of grievances and resolutions.

== Federal judicial service ==
Trigg was nominated by President Abraham Lincoln on July 16, 1862, to a joint seat on the United States District Court for the Eastern District of Tennessee, the United States District Court for the Middle District of Tennessee and the United States District Court for the Western District of Tennessee vacated by Judge West Hughes Humphreys, who had been removed from office by the United States Senate on June 26, 1862, for siding with the Confederate States of America. He was confirmed by the United States Senate on July 17, 1862, and received his commission the same day. He was reassigned to serve only in the Eastern District and Middle District on June 14, 1878. His service terminated on April 25, 1880, due to his death in Bristol, Tennessee.

== Sources ==
- Pulliam, David Loyd (1901). The Constitutional Conventions of Virginia from the foundation of the Commonwealth to the present time. John T. West, Richmond. ISBN 978-1-2879-2059-5.

Legal offices
| Preceded by West Hughes Humphreys | Judge of the United States District Court for the Western District of Tennessee; 1862–1878 | Succeeded by Seat abolished |
| Preceded by West Hughes Humphreys | Judge of the United States District Court for the Eastern District of Tennessee; Judge of the United States District Court for the Middle District of Tennessee; 1862–1880 | Succeeded by David M. Key |
