= Deaths of United States federal judges in active service =

Deaths of United States federal judges in active service have profound political and procedural effects. Due to their implications for the political composition of the courts on which they serve, they can result in unexpected political conflicts regarding appointments to fill those seats. Such incidences can also disrupt the operations of the court with respect to active cases assigned to the deceased judge, and with opinions written by the deceased judge but not yet distributed. Historically, the rate of judges dying in active service was highest in the early days of the country, but declined sharply as lifespans increased, and as various legislation was introduced first allowing retiring judges to collect a pension, and later allowing judges to transition from active service to senior status, continuing to do judicial work in a semi-retired state.

== Background ==
While Article Three of the United States Constitution provides that "Judges, both of the supreme and inferior Courts, shall hold their Offices during good Behaviour", thereby securing lifetime appointments, in practice a substantial majority of federal judges have resigned, retired, or otherwise left active service prior to their death. In Federalist No. 79, Alexander Hamilton, advocating for lifetime judicial appointments rather than a set retirement age, suggested that the people should "consider how few there are who outlive the season of intellectual vigor, and how improbable it is that any considerable portion of the bench, whether more or less numerous, should be in such a situation at the same time". A majority of federal judges who died in office in the 18th and 19th centuries died before reaching the age of 65, with several dying in their 30s. As one source has noted, "given what we now know about health and ageing, it must have been uncommon then for old age to impact adversely on the performance of a federal judge's official duties. However, as the epidemiological transition took root, and as life expectancy in the United States lengthened, early death provided a dwindling solution to age-related declined in mental capacity. Instead, the judicial system had to place greater reliance on the discretion of federal judges to retire at an appropriate point in their careers". Concerns about the capacity of aging judges were often dealt with informally; for example, Supreme Court Justice George Shiras Jr. recounted having once been part of a committee "sent to suggest to an aged judge that he had remained in service too long".

The Judiciary Act of 1869 allowed judges to receive a pension upon retirement, and beginning in 1919, the retirement of judges from active duty was further facilitated by legislation creating senior status, in which a judge could retire from full-time service while continuing to receive full pay for engaging in a lighter amount of work. Historically, judges have often sought to time their retirement from the bench so that their replacement can be named by a president of the same political party; the death of a judge in office therefore presents a situation where this timing is out of the judge's control.

== Political consequences ==
Due to the unpredictability of such circumstances, deaths of judges in active service are more likely to lead to judicial appointment controversies (where one party resists the confirmation of a judge appointed by a president of the other party); such deaths occasionally change the structure of the court itself, as legislators may seek to avoid changing the balance of a particular court by abolishing the seat vacated by the death. These issues have most widely been reported in the popular media with respect to justices of the Supreme Court of the United States, but have also been reported with respect to judges of lower courts.

At the district court level, for example, Republicans were able to scuttle of the nomination by Democrat Jimmy Carter of recess appointment Walter Heen to replace Republican Gerald Ford-appointee Dick Yin Wong on the United States District Court for the District of Hawaii. Wong had died in 1978, and Republicans argued that there had always been Republican representation in the District. The seat was ultimately filled by Republican Ronald Reagan, who appointed Harold Fong.

== Logistical consequences ==
Judges preparing to retire generally wind down the active cases over which they are presiding, or make preparations for the reassignment of these cases to other judges. Unlike planned retirements, deaths of judges can disrupt these active cases, necessitating redistribution of the court's docket to accommodate the handling of previously scheduled proceedings. The Federal Rules of Criminal Procedure, in particular, provide for the reassignment of cases where the presiding judge has died during a criminal trial.

In 2019, the Supreme Court ruled that where a judge serving on a panel died after voting on the outcome of a case, but before the decision was announced, the vote of the deceased judge could no longer be counted. The Court noted that "[f]ederal judges are appointed for life, not for eternity". Traditionally, law clerks of the deceased judge may be reassigned to other judges on the same court, or may be held over in chambers to work for the successor appointed to replace the deceased judge, although there is no legal requirement or guarantee that they be retained. Legislation provides for a survivor's annuity to benefit the widow, widower or minor child of a judge who dies while in service, which may be purchased via a deduction of 2.2% to 3.5% from the retirement benefit.

== Lists ==
The following are lists of United States Article Three federal judges who died while in active service from 1789 to the present day. In some cases, judges have been appointed to one court, and then reassigned by operation of law to another court when the original court is subdivided, merged, or otherwise reconfigured. In other cases, judges initially appointed to one court have later been elevated to a higher court. This list indicates only the placement of the judge at the time of their death. For judges nominated by different presidents to different judicial offices, the list indicates only the last president to successfully nominate them to a judicial office.

=== 1789–1869 ===
A total of 107 United States Article III federal judges died in office between the establishment of the federal judiciary with the Judiciary Act of 1789 and the enactment of the Judiciary Act of 1869, which provided for pensions for retiring federal judges, making it easier for them to depart the bench before death. Of these, 22 were justices of the Supreme Court of the United States.

Judge	Appointing president	Court	Date of birth	Confirmation date	Date of death and age	Successor
William Drayton Sr.	Washington	D.S.C.	March 21, 1732	February 10, 1790	May 18, 1790 (aged 58)	Thomas Bee
David Brearley	Washington	D.N.J.	June 11, 1745	September 25, 1789	August 16, 1790 (aged 45)	Robert Morris
John Stokes	Washington	D.N.C.	March 20, 1756	August 3, 1790	October 12, 1790 (aged 34)	John Sitgreaves
Francis Hopkinson	Washington	D. Penn.	October 2, 1737	September 26, 1789	May 9, 1791 (aged 53)	William Lewis
John Sullivan	Washington	D.N.H.	February 17, 1740	September 26, 1789	January 23, 1795 (aged 54)	John Pickering
Henry Marchant	Washington	D.R.I.	April 9, 1741	July 3, 1790	August 30, 1796 (aged 55)	Benjamin Bourne
James Wilson	Washington	SCOTUS	September 14, 1742	September 26, 1789	August 21, 1798 (aged 55)	Bushrod Washington
William Paca	Washington	D. Md.	October 31, 1740	February 10, 1790	October 13, 1799 (aged 58)	James Winchester
James Iredell	Washington	SCOTUS	October 5, 1751	February 10, 1790	October 20, 1799 (aged 48)	Alfred Moore
John Sitgreaves	Washington	D.N.C.	1757	December 20, 1790	March 4, 1802 (aged 44–45)	Henry Potter
John Lowell	J. Adams	1st Cir.	June 17, 1743	February 20, 1801	May 6, 1802 (aged 58)	Seat abolished
John Sloss Hobart	J. Adams	D.N.Y.	May 6, 1738	April 12, 1798	February 4, 1805 (aged 66)	Matthias B. Tallmadge
Richard Law	Washington	D. Conn.	March 7, 1733	September 26, 1789	January 26, 1806 (aged 72)	Pierpont Edwards
James Winchester	J. Adams	D. Md.	September 13, 1772	December 10, 1799	April 5, 1806 (aged 33)	James Houston
William Paterson	Washington	SCOTUS	December 24, 1745	March 4, 1793	September 9, 1806 (aged 60)	Henry Brockholst Livingston
Allen Bowie Duckett	Jefferson	D.C. Cir.	1775	March 3, 1806	July 19, 1809 (aged 33–34)	Buckner Thruston
William Cushing	Washington	SCOTUS	March 1, 1732	September 26, 1789	September 13, 1810 (aged 78)	Joseph Story
Cyrus Griffin	Washington	D. Va.	July 16, 1748	February 10, 1790	December 14, 1810 (aged 62)	John Tyler Sr.
Samuel Chase	Washington	SCOTUS	April 17, 1741	January 27, 1796	June 19, 1811 (aged 70)	Gabriel Duvall
Thomas Bee	Washington	D.S.C.	1739	June 14, 1790	February 18, 1812 (aged 72–73)	John Drayton
Gunning Bedford Jr.	Washington	D. Del.	1747	September 26, 1789	March 30, 1812 (aged 64–65)	John Fisher
David L. Barnes	Jefferson	D.R.I.	January 28, 1760	January 26, 1802	November 3, 1812 (aged 52)	David Howell
John Tyler Sr.	Madison	D. Va.	February 28, 1747	January 3, 1811	January 6, 1813 (aged 65)	St. George Tucker
Nicholas Battalle Fitzhugh	Jefferson	D.C. Cir.	May 10, 1764	November 25, 1803	December 31, 1814 (aged 50)	James Sewall Morsell
Robert Morris	Washington	D.N.J.	1745	December 20, 1790	June 2, 1815 (aged 69–70)	William Sanford Pennington
Harry Innes	Washington	D. Ky.	January 4, 1752	September 26, 1789	September 20, 1816 (aged 64)	Robert Trimble
James Houston	Jefferson	D. Md.	October 10, 1767	April 21, 1806	June 8, 1819 (aged 51)	Theodorick Bland
Dominic Augustin Hall	Madison	D. La.	January 1, 1765	June 1, 1813	December 19, 1820 (aged 55)	John Dick
John Drayton	Madison	D.S.C.	June 22, 1766	May 7, 1812	November 27, 1822 (aged 56)	Thomas Lee
Henry Brockholst Livingston	Jefferson	SCOTUS	November 25, 1757	December 17, 1806	March 18, 1823 (aged 65)	Smith Thompson
William Bayard Shields	Monroe	D. Miss.	1780	April 20, 1818	April 18, 1823 (aged 42–43)	Peter Randolph
John Fisher	Madison	D. Del.	May 22, 1771	April 23, 1812	April 22, 1823 (aged 51)	Willard Hall
Jonathan Hoge Walker	Monroe	W.D. Pa.	July 20, 1754	April 20, 1818	March 23, 1824 (aged 69)	William Wilkins
John Dick	Monroe	E.D. La. W.D. La.	1788	March 2, 1821	April 23, 1824 (aged 35–36)	Thomas B. Robertson
David Howell	Madison	D.R.I.	January 1, 1747	November 16, 1812	July 30, 1824 (aged 77)	John Pitman
John G. Jackson	Monroe	W.D. Va.	September 22, 1777	February 24, 1819	March 28, 1825 (aged 47)	Philip C. Pendleton
Roger Skinner	Monroe	N.D.N.Y.	June 1, 1773	January 5, 1820	August 19, 1825 (aged 52)	Alfred Conkling
Thomas Todd	Jefferson	SCOTUS	January 23, 1765	March 2, 1807	February 7, 1826 (aged 61)	Robert Trimble
Pierpont Edwards	Jefferson	D. Conn.	April 8, 1750	February 24, 1806	April 5, 1826 (aged 75)	William Bristol
William P. Van Ness	Madison	S.D.N.Y.	February 13, 1778	May 26, 1812	September 6, 1826 (aged 48)	Samuel Betts
William Sanford Pennington	Madison	D.N.J.	1757	January 9, 1816	September 17, 1826 (aged 68–69)	William Rossell
Richard Peters	Washington	E.D. Pa.	June 22, 1744	January 13, 1792	August 22, 1828 (aged 84)	Joseph Hopkinson
Charles Willing Byrd	Jefferson	D. Ohio	July 26, 1770	March 3, 1803	August 25, 1828 (aged 58)	William Creighton Jr.
Robert Trimble	J.Q. Adams	SCOTUS	November 17, 1776	May 9, 1826	August 25, 1828 (aged 51)	John McLean
Thomas B. Robertson	Monroe	E.D. La. W.D. La.	February 27, 1779	May 26, 1824	October 5, 1828 (aged 49)	Samuel Hadden Harper
Bushrod Washington	J. Adams	SCOTUS	June 5, 1762	December 20, 1798	November 26, 1829 (aged 67)	Henry Baldwin
John S. Sherburne	Jefferson	D.N.H.	1757	March 24, 1804	August 2, 1830 (aged 72–73)	Matthew Harvey
George Hay	J.Q. Adams	E.D. Va.	December 17, 1765	March 31, 1826	September 21, 1830 (aged 64)	Philip P. Barbour
Peter Randolph	Monroe	D. Miss.	1779	December 9, 1823	January 30, 1832 (aged 52–53)	Powhatan Ellis
John Wilson Campbell	Jackson	D. Ohio	February 23, 1782	March 7, 1829	September 24, 1833 (aged 51)	Benjamin Tappan
John Boyle	J.Q. Adams	D. Ky.	October 28, 1774	February 12, 1827	January 28, 1834 (aged 59)	Thomas Bell Monroe
William Johnson	Jefferson	SCOTUS	December 27, 1771	March 24, 1804	August 4, 1834 (aged 62)	James M. Wayne
John Marshall	J. Adams	SCOTUS	September 24, 1755	January 27, 1801	July 6, 1835 (aged 79)	Roger B. Taney
Benjamin Parke	Monroe	D. Ind.	September 2, 1777	March 5, 1817	July 12, 1835 (aged 57)	Jesse Lynch Holman
William Bristol	J.Q. Adams	D. Conn.	June 2, 1779	May 22, 1826	March 7, 1836 (aged 56)	Andrew T. Judson
James H. Peck	Monroe	D. Mo.	January 12, 1790	April 5, 1822	April 29, 1836 (aged 46)	Robert William Wells
Samuel Hadden Harper	Jackson	E.D. La. W.D. La.	1783	March 7, 1829	July 19, 1837 (aged 53–54)	Philip Kissick Lawrence
Alexander Caldwell	J.Q. Adams	W.D. Va.	November 1, 1774	January 3, 1826	April 8, 1839 (aged 64)	Isaac S. Pennybacker
Jeremiah La Touche Cuyler	Monroe	D. Ga.	June 4, 1768	January 10, 1822	May 7, 1839 (aged 70)	John Cochran Nicoll
Thomas Lee	Monroe	D.S.C.	December 1, 1769	February 17, 1823	October 24, 1839 (aged 69)	Robert Budd Gilchrist
William Rossell	J.Q. Adams	D.N.J.	October 25, 1760	December 19, 1826	June 20, 1840 (aged 79)	Mahlon Dickerson
Philip P. Barbour	Jackson	SCOTUS	May 25, 1783	March 15, 1836	February 25, 1841 (aged 57)	Peter V. Daniel
Joseph Hopkinson	J.Q. Adams	E.D. Pa.	November 12, 1770	February 23, 1829	January 15, 1842 (aged 71)	Archibald Randall
Jesse Lynch Holman	Jackson	D. Ind.	October 24, 1784	March 29, 1836	March 28, 1842 (aged 57)	Elisha Mills Huntington
Smith Thompson	Monroe	SCOTUS	January 17, 1768	December 9, 1823	December 18, 1843 (aged 75)	Samuel Nelson
Henry Baldwin	Jackson	SCOTUS	January 14, 1780	January 6, 1830	April 21, 1844 (aged 64)	Robert Cooper Grier
Buckner Thruston	Madison	D.C. Cir.	February 9, 1763	December 13, 1809	August 30, 1845 (aged 82)	James Dunlop
Joseph Story	Madison	SCOTUS	September 18, 1779	November 18, 1811	September 10, 1845 (aged 65)	Levi Woodbury
Archibald Randall	Tyler	E.D. Pa.	May 24, 1797	March 8, 1842	June 8, 1846 (aged 49)	John K. Kane
William Crawford	J.Q. Adams	M.D. Ala. N.D. Ala. S.D. Ala.	1784	May 22, 1826	February 28, 1849 (aged 64–65)	John Gayle
Benjamin Johnson	Jackson	D. Ark.	January 22, 1784	June 29, 1836	October 2, 1849 (aged 65)	Daniel Ringo
Nathaniel Pope	Monroe	D. Ill.	January 5, 1784	March 3, 1819	January 23, 1850 (aged 66)	Thomas Drummond
Levi Woodbury	Polk	SCOTUS	December 22, 1789	January 3, 1846	September 4, 1851 (aged 61)	Benjamin Robbins Curtis
James McHall Jones	Fillmore	S.D. Cal.	December 31, 1823	December 26, 1850	December 15, 1851 (aged 27)	Seat abolished
Upton Scott Heath	Jackson	D. Md.	October 10, 1784	April 4, 1836	February 21, 1852 (aged 67)	John Glenn
John McKinley	Van Buren	SCOTUS	May 1, 1780	September 25, 1837	July 19, 1852 (aged 72)	John Archibald Campbell
Morgan Welles Brown	Jackson	E.D. Tenn. M.D. Tenn. W.D. Tenn.	1800	December 31, 1833	March 7, 1853 (aged 52–53)	West Hughes Humphreys
Andrew T. Judson	Jackson	D. Conn.	November 29, 1784	July 4, 1836	March 17, 1853 (aged 68)	Charles A. Ingersoll
John Glenn	Fillmore	D. Md.	October 9, 1795	March 19, 1852	July 8, 1853 (aged 57)	William F. Giles
Isaac H. Bronson	Polk	N.D. Fla.	October 16, 1802	August 8, 1846	August 13, 1855 (aged 52)	McQueen McIntosh
William Cranch	Jefferson	D.C. Cir.	July 17, 1769	February 24, 1806	September 1, 1855 (aged 86)	James Dunlop
John James Dyer	Polk	D. Iowa	July 26, 1809	March 3, 1847	September 14, 1855 (aged 46)	James M. Love
Robert Budd Gilchrist	Van Buren	D.S.C.	September 28, 1796	February 17, 1840	May 1, 1856 (aged 59)	Andrew Gordon Magrath
Samuel Prentiss	Tyler	D. Vt.	March 31, 1782	April 8, 1842	January 15, 1857 (aged 74)	David Allen Smalley
Henry Potter	Jefferson	D.N.C.	January 5, 1766	April 7, 1802	December 20, 1857 (aged 91)	Asa Biggs
John K. Kane	Polk	E.D. Pa.	May 16, 1795	June 17, 1846	February 21, 1858 (aged 62)	John Cadwalader
John Gayle	Taylor	M.D. Ala. N.D. Ala. S.D. Ala.	September 11, 1792	March 13, 1849	July 21, 1859 (aged 66)	William Giles Jones
Charles A. Ingersoll	Pierce	D. Conn.	October 19, 1798	April 8, 1853	January 12, 1860 (aged 61)	William Davis Shipman
Peter V. Daniel	Van Buren	SCOTUS	April 24, 1784	March 2, 1841	May 31, 1860 (aged 76)	Samuel Freeman Miller
John McLean	Jackson	SCOTUS	March 11, 1785	March 7, 1829	April 4, 1861 (aged 76)	Noah Haynes Swayne
Isaac Stockton Keith Ogier	Pierce	S.D. Cal.	July 27, 1819	January 23, 1854	May 21, 1861 (aged 41)	Fletcher Mathews Haight
Elisha Mills Huntington	Tyler	D. Ind.	March 29, 1806	May 2, 1842	October 26, 1862 (aged 56)	Caleb B. Smith
Philemon Dickerson	Van Buren	D.N.J.	January 11, 1788	February 27, 1841	December 10, 1862 (aged 74)	Richard Stockton Field
Caleb B. Smith	Lincoln	D. Ind.	April 16, 1808	December 22, 1862	January 7, 1864 (aged 55)	Albert Smith White
Albert Smith White	Lincoln	D. Ind.	October 24, 1803	January 18, 1864	September 4, 1864 (aged 60)	David McDonald
Robert William Wells	Jackson	W.D. Mo.	November 29, 1795	June 27, 1836	September 22, 1864 (aged 68)	Arnold Krekel
Archibald Williams	Lincoln	D. Kan.	June 10, 1801	March 12, 1861	September 21, 1863 (aged 62)	Mark W. Delahay
George Washington Lane	Lincoln	M.D. Ala. N.D. Ala. S.D. Ala.	1806	March 28, 1861	November 12, 1863 (aged 56–57)	Richard Busteed
Roger B. Taney	Jackson	SCOTUS	March 17, 1777	March 15, 1836	October 12, 1864 (aged 87)	Salmon P. Chase
John Pitman	Monroe	D.R.I.	February 23, 1785	January 3, 1825	November 17, 1864 (aged 79)	J. Russell Bullock
John Catron	Jackson	SCOTUS	January 7, 1786	March 8, 1837	May 30, 1865 (aged 79)	Seat abolished
Fletcher Mathews Haight	Lincoln	S.D. Cal.	November 28, 1799	August 5, 1861	February 23, 1866 (aged 66)	Seat abolished
Matthew Harvey	Jackson	D.N.H.	June 21, 1781	December 16, 1830	April 7, 1866 (aged 84)	Daniel Clark
Hiram V. Willson	Pierce	N.D. Ohio	April 1808	February 20, 1855	November 11, 1866 (aged 58)	Charles Taylor Sherman
James M. Wayne	Jackson	SCOTUS	1790	January 9, 1835	July 5, 1867 (aged 76–77)	Seat abolished
David McDonald	Lincoln	D. Ind.	May 8, 1803	December 13, 1864	August 25, 1869 (aged 66)	Walter Q. Gresham
Alexander W. Baldwin	Lincoln	D. Nev.	June 1835	March 11, 1865	November 14, 1869 (aged 34)	Edgar Winters Hillyer

=== 1870–1919 ===
138 United States Article III federal judges died in office between the enactment of the Judiciary Act of 1869, providing for pensions for retiring federal judges, and the enactment of legislation in 1919 allowing judges to serve in senior status. During this period the number of federal judgeships was substantially increased with the admission of new states to the union, and with the establishment of the United States courts of appeals by the Judiciary Act of 1891. In the same period, the two-party divide between the Democratic Party and the Republican Party became firmly established, with the appointment of judges developing as a point of contention between the two parties. Of the judges who died in office during this period, 17 were justices of the Supreme Court of the United States.

Judge	Appointing president	Court	Date of birth	Confirmation date	Date of death and age	Successor	Change of party
John McKinney	Grant	S.D. Fla.	1829	February 18, 1871	October 12, 1871 (aged 41–42)	James William Locke	No
Salmon P. Chase	Lincoln	SCOTUS	January 13, 1808	December 6, 1864	May 7, 1873 (aged 65)	Morrison Waite	No
John Curtiss Underwood	Lincoln	E.D. Va.	March 14, 1809	January 25, 1864	December 7, 1873 (aged 64)	Robert William Hughes	No
Nathan K. Hall	Fillmore	N.D.N.Y.	March 28, 1810	August 31, 1852	March 2, 1874 (aged 63)	William James Wallace	W → R
John W. Longyear	Grant	E.D. Mich.	October 22, 1820	February 18, 1870	March 10, 1875 (aged 54)	Henry Billings Brown	No
Lewis Bartholomew Woodruff	Grant	2d Cir.	June 19, 1809	December 22, 1869	September 10, 1875 (aged 66)	Alexander S. Johnson	No
Philip Fraser	Lincoln	N.D. Fla.	January 27, 1814	July 17, 1862	July 26, 1876 (aged 62)	Thomas Settle	No
David Allen Smalley	Pierce	D. Vt.	April 6, 1809	February 3, 1857	March 10, 1877 (aged 67)	Hoyt Henry Wheeler	D → R
Halmor Hull Emmons	Grant	6th Cir.	November 22, 1814	January 17, 1870	May 14, 1877 (aged 62)	John Baxter	No
James C. Hopkins	Grant	W.D. Wis.	April 27, 1819	July 9, 1870	September 3, 1877 (aged 58)	Romanzo Bunn	No
Alexander S. Johnson	Grant	2d Cir.	July 30, 1817	December 15, 1875	January 26, 1878 (aged 60)	Samuel Blatchford	No
George Foster Shepley	Grant	1st Cir.	January 1, 1819	December 22, 1869	July 20, 1878 (aged 59)	John Lowell	No
John Cadwalader	Buchanan	E.D. Pa.	April 1, 1805	April 24, 1858	January 26, 1879 (aged 73)	William Butler	D → R
William F. Giles	Pierce	D. Md.	April 8, 1807	January 11, 1854	March 21, 1879 (aged 71)	Thomas John Morris	D → R
David Campbell Humphreys	Grant	S.C.D.C.	November 9, 1817	May 10, 1870	July 12, 1879 (aged 61)	Charles Pinckney James	No
Bland Ballard	Lincoln	D. Ky.	September 4, 1819	January 22, 1862	July 29, 1879 (aged 59)	William Hercules Hays	No
Winthrop Welles Ketcham	Grant	W.D. Pa.	June 29, 1820	June 26, 1876	December 6, 1879 (aged 59)	Marcus W. Acheson	No
William Hercules Hays	Hayes	D. Ky.	August 26, 1820	December 10, 1879	March 7, 1880 (aged 59)	John W. Barr	No
Connally Findlay Trigg	Lincoln	E.D. Tenn. M.D. Tenn.	March 8, 1810	July 17, 1862	April 25, 1880 (aged 70)	David M. Key	No
Thomas Howard DuVal	Pierce	W.D. Tex.	November 4, 1813	March 3, 1857	October 10, 1880 (aged 66)	Ezekiel B. Turner	D → R
Nathan Clifford	Buchanan	SCOTUS	August 18, 1803	January 12, 1858	July 25, 1881 (aged 77)	Horace Gray	D → R
Edward Fox	A. Johnson	D. Me.	June 10, 1815	May 30, 1866	December 14, 1881 (aged 66)	Nathan Webb	D → R
George Washington Brooks	A. Johnson	E.D.N.C.	March 16, 1821	January 22, 1866	January 6, 1882 (aged 60)	Seat abolished	n/a
Edgar Winters Hillyer	Grant	D. Nev.	December 3, 1830	December 21, 1869	May 10, 1882 (aged 51)	George Myron Sabin	No
Philip Bergen Swing	Grant	S.D. Ohio	October 23, 1820	March 30, 1871	October 31, 1882 (aged 62)	William White	No
William White	Arthur	S.D. Ohio	January 28, 1822	February 19, 1883	March 12, 1883 (aged 61) (Note: Died without having taken the oath of office.)	George Read Sage	No
Edward Green Bradford	Grant	D. Del.	July 17, 1819	December 12, 1871	January 16, 1884 (aged 64)	Leonard Eugene Wales	No
John Baxter	Hayes	6th Cir.	March 5, 1819	December 13, 1877	April 2, 1886 (aged 67)	Howell E. Jackson	R → D
Solomon Lewis Withey	Lincoln	W.D. Mich.	April 21, 1820	March 11, 1863	April 25, 1886 (aged 66)	Henry Franklin Severens	R → D
Henry Kent McCay	Arthur	N.D. Ga.	January 8, 1820	August 4, 1882	July 30, 1886 (aged 66)	William Truslow Newman	R → D
Samuel H. Treat	Pierce	S.D. Ill.	June 21, 1811	March 3, 1855	March 27, 1887 (aged 75)	William J. Allen	No
David Kellogg Cartter	Lincoln	S.C.D.C.	June 22, 1812	March 11, 1863	April 16, 1887 (aged 74)	Edward Franklin Bingham	R → D
William Burnham Woods	Hayes	SCOTUS	August 3, 1824	December 21, 1880	May 14, 1887 (aged 62)	Lucius Quintus Cincinnatus Lamar	R → D
Morrison Waite	Grant	SCOTUS	November 29, 1816	January 21, 1874	March 23, 1888 (aged 71)	Melville Fuller	R → D
Ezekiel B. Turner	Hayes	W.D. Tex.	May 24, 1825	December 20, 1880	June 2, 1888 (aged 63)	Thomas Shelton Maxey	R → D
Thomas Settle	Grant	N.D. Fla.	January 23, 1831	January 30, 1877	December 1, 1888 (aged 57)	Charles Swayne	No (Note: Vacancy occurred during a Democratic administration, but was filled during a Republican administration.)
William Matthews Merrick	Cleveland	S.C.D.C.	September 1, 1818	March 30, 1886	February 4, 1889 (aged 70)	Andrew Coyle Bradley	D → R
Stanley Matthews	Garfield	SCOTUS	July 21, 1824	May 12, 1881	March 22, 1889 (aged 64)	David J. Brewer	No
John T. Nixon	Grant	D.N.J.	August 31, 1820	April 29, 1870	September 28, 1889 (aged 69)	Edward T. Green	No
Chauncey Brewer Sabin	Arthur	E.D. Tex.	August 6, 1824	April 5, 1884	March 30, 1890 (aged 65)	David Ezekiel Bryant	No
George Myron Sabin	Arthur	D. Nev.	August 1833	July 26, 1882	May 12, 1890 (aged 56)	Thomas Porter Hawley	No
Samuel Freeman Miller	Lincoln	SCOTUS	April 5, 1816	July 16, 1862	October 13, 1890 (aged 74)	Henry Billings Brown	No
Daniel Clark	A. Johnson	D.N.H.	October 24, 1809	July 27, 1866	January 2, 1891 (aged 81)	Edgar Aldrich	D → R
James M. Love	Pierce	S.D. Iowa	March 4, 1820	February 25, 1856	July 2, 1891 (aged 71)	John Simson Woolson	D → R
Ogden Hoffman Jr.	Fillmore	N.D. Cal.	October 16, 1822	February 27, 1851	August 9, 1891 (aged 68)	William W. Morrow	W → R
Lorenzo Sawyer	Grant	9th Cir.	May 23, 1820	January 10, 1870	September 7, 1891 (aged 71)	Joseph McKenna	No
Joseph P. Bradley	Grant	SCOTUS	March 14, 1813	March 21, 1870	January 22, 1892 (aged 78)	George Shiras Jr.	No
Lucius Quintus Cincinnatus Lamar	Cleveland	SCOTUS	September 17, 1825	January 16, 1888	January 23, 1893 (aged 67)	Howell E. Jackson	D → R
Matthew Deady	Buchanan	D. Ore.	May 12, 1824	March 9, 1859	March 24, 1893 (aged 68)	Charles B. Bellinger	No
Samuel Blatchford	Arthur	SCOTUS	March 9, 1820	March 22, 1882	July 7, 1893 (aged 73)	Edward Douglass White	R → D
Hugh Lennox Bond	Grant	4th Cir.	December 16, 1828	July 13, 1870	October 24, 1893 (aged 64)	Charles Henry Simonton	R → D
Edward Coke Billings	Grant	E.D. La.	December 3, 1829	February 10, 1876	December 1, 1893 (aged 63)	Charles Parlange	R → D
Howell E. Jackson	B. Harrison	SCOTUS	April 8, 1832	February 18, 1893	August 8, 1895 (aged 63)	Rufus W. Peckham	R → D
George Moulton Carpenter Jr.	Arthur	D.R.I.	April 22, 1844	December 18, 1884	July 31, 1896 (aged 52)	Arthur Lewis Brown	R → D
Alfred Delavan Thomas	B. Harrison	D.N.D.	August 11, 1837	February 25, 1890	August 8, 1896 (aged 58)	Charles F. Amidon	R → D
Alonzo J. Edgerton	B. Harrison	D.S.D.	June 7, 1827	January 16, 1890	August 9, 1896 (aged 69)	John Emmett Carland	R → D
Edward T. Green	B. Harrison	D.N.J.	1837	January 27, 1890	October 10, 1896 (aged 58–59)	Andrew Kirkpatrick	R → D
Elmer Scipio Dundy	A. Johnson	D. Neb.	March 5, 1830	April 9, 1868	October 28, 1896 (aged 66)	William Douglas McHugh	No
Isaac C. Parker	Grant	W.D. Ark.	October 15, 1838	March 19, 1875	November 17, 1896 (aged 58)	John Henry Rogers	R → D
Augustus Sherrill Seymour	Arthur	E.D.N.C.	November 30, 1836	February 21, 1882	February 19, 1897 (aged 60)	Thomas Richard Purnell	No
Leonard Eugene Wales	Arthur	D. Del.	November 26, 1823	March 20, 1884	February 8, 1897 (aged 73)	Edward Green Bradford II	No
Thomas Leverett Nelson	Hayes	D. Mass.	March 4, 1827	January 10, 1879	November 21, 1897 (aged 70)	Francis Cabot Lowell	No
Asa Wentworth Tenney	McKinley	E.D.N.Y.	May 20, 1833	July 8, 1897	December 10, 1897 (aged 64)	Edward B. Thomas	No
John B. Rector	B. Harrison	N.D. Tex.	November 24, 1837	March 28, 1892	April 9, 1898 (aged 60)	Seat abolished	n/a
John William Showalter	Cleveland	7th Cir.	February 8, 1844	March 1, 1895	December 10, 1898 (aged 54)	Peter S. Grosscup	D → R
John Simson Woolson	B. Harrison	S.D. Iowa	December 6, 1840	January 11, 1892	December 4, 1899 (aged 58)	Smith McPherson	No
John A. Williams	B. Harrison	E.D. Ark.	May 1, 1835	September 22, 1890	July 7, 1900 (aged 65)	Jacob Trieber	No
William J. Allen	Cleveland	S.D. Ill.	June 9, 1829	January 19, 1888	January 26, 1901 (aged 71)	J. Otis Humphrey	D → R
William Allen Woods	B. Harrison	7th Cir.	May 16, 1837	March 17, 1892	June 29, 1901 (aged 64)	Francis E. Baker	No
John Bruce	Grant	M.D. Ala. N.D. Ala.	February 16, 1832	February 27, 1875	October 1, 1901 (aged 69)	Thomas G. Jones	No
John Paul	Arthur	W.D. Va.	June 30, 1839	March 3, 1883	November 1, 1901 (aged 62)	Henry C. McDowell Jr.	No
Linton McGee Collins	L.B. Johnson	Ct. Cl.	June 21, 1902	September 17, 1964	April 12, 1972 (aged 69)	Marion T. Bennett	D → R
Andrew Coyle Bradley	B. Harrison	S.C.D.C.	February 12, 1844	March 23, 1889	May 15, 1902 (aged 58)	Ashley Mulgrave Gould	No
Horace Gray	Arthur	SCOTUS	March 24, 1828	December 20, 1881	September 15, 1902 (aged 74)	Oliver Wendell Holmes Jr.	No
Charles Henry Simonton	Cleveland	4th Cir.	July 11, 1829	December 19, 1893	April 25, 1904 (aged 74)	Jeter C. Pritchard	D → R
Andrew Kirkpatrick	Cleveland	D.N.J.	October 8, 1844	December 15, 1896	May 3, 1904 (aged 59)	William M. Lanning	D → R
Eli Shelby Hammond	Hayes	W.D. Tenn.	April 1, 1838	June 17, 1878	December 17, 1904 (aged 66)	John E. McCall	No
Amos Madden Thayer	Cleveland	8th Cir.	October 10, 1841	August 9, 1894	April 24, 1905 (aged 63)	Elmer B. Adams	D → R
Charles B. Bellinger	Cleveland	D. Ore.	November 21, 1839	April 15, 1893	May 12, 1905 (aged 65)	Charles E. Wolverton	D → R
Marcus W. Acheson	B. Harrison	3d Cir.	June 7, 1828	February 3, 1891	June 21, 1906 (aged 78)	Joseph Buffington	No
George P. Wanty	McKinley	W.D. Mich.	March 12, 1856	March 13, 1900	July 9, 1906 (aged 50)	Loyal Edwin Knappen	No
Augustus J. Ricks	B. Harrison	N.D. Ohio	February 10, 1843	January 16, 1890	December 22, 1906 (aged 63)	Seat abolished	n/a
Charles Parlange	Cleveland	E.D. La.	July 23, 1851	January 15, 1894	February 4, 1907 (aged 55)	Eugene Davis Saunders	D → R
William Kneeland Townsend	T. Roosevelt	2d Cir.	June 12, 1849	January 21, 1902	June 2, 1907 (aged 57)	Walter Chadwick Noyes	No
Charles Swayne	B. Harrison	N.D. Fla.	August 10, 1842	April 1, 1890	July 5, 1907 (aged 64)	William Bostwick Sheppard	No
Louis E. McComas	T. Roosevelt	D.C. Cir.	October 28, 1846	December 6, 1905	November 10, 1907 (aged 61)	Josiah Alexander Van Orsdel	No
Charles Dickens Clark	Cleveland	E.D. Tenn. M.D. Tenn.	October 7, 1847	January 21, 1895	March 15, 1908 (aged 60)	Edward Terry Sanford	D → R
Thomas Richard Purnell	McKinley	E.D.N.C.	November 11, 1847	May 5, 1897	December 19, 1908 (aged 61)	Henry G. Connor	No
John K. Richards	T. Roosevelt	6th Cir.	March 15, 1856	February 23, 1903	March 1, 1909 (aged 52)	John Wesley Warrington	No
Solomon H. Bethea	T. Roosevelt	N.D. Ill.	May 18, 1852	March 18, 1905	August 3, 1909 (aged 57)	George Albert Carpenter	No
Rufus W. Peckham	Cleveland	SCOTUS	November 8, 1838	December 9, 1895	October 24, 1909 (aged 70)	Horace Harmon Lurton	D → R
Albert C. Thompson	McKinley	S.D. Ohio	January 23, 1842	December 20, 1898	January 26, 1910 (aged 68)	Seat abolished	n/a
David Ezekiel Bryant	B. Harrison	E.D. Tex.	October 19, 1849	May 27, 1890	February 5, 1910 (aged 60)	Gordon J. Russell	No
David J. Brewer	B. Harrison	SCOTUS	June 27, 1837	December 18, 1889	March 28, 1910 (aged 72)	Charles Evans Hughes	No
Melville Fuller	Cleveland	SCOTUS	February 11, 1833	July 20, 1888	July 4, 1910 (aged 77)	Edward Douglass White	D → R
Edward Whitson	T. Roosevelt	E.D. Wash.	October 6, 1852	March 14, 1905	October 15, 1910 (aged 58)	Frank H. Rudkin	No
Robert Walker Tayler	T. Roosevelt	N.D. Ohio	November 20, 1852	January 10, 1905	November 25, 1910 (aged 58)	William Louis Day	No
Francis Cabot Lowell	T. Roosevelt	1st Cir.	January 7, 1855	February 23, 1905	March 6, 1911 (aged 56)	William Schofield	No
John Henry Rogers	Cleveland	W.D. Ark.	October 9, 1845	December 15, 1896	April 17, 1911 (aged 65) (Note: Sources vary on Rogers' date of death, which is uncertain, most giving it as April 16 or 17, 1911.)	Frank A. Youmans	D → R
John Marshall Harlan	Hayes	SCOTUS	June 1, 1833	November 29, 1877	October 14, 1911 (aged 78)	Mahlon Pitney	No
Joseph V. Quarles	T. Roosevelt	E.D. Wis.	December 16, 1843	March 6, 1905	October 7, 1911 (aged 67)	Ferdinand August Geiger	No
George B. Adams	T. Roosevelt	S.D.N.Y.	April 3, 1845	December 17, 1901	October 9, 1911 (aged 66)	Julius Marshuetz Mayer	No
William M. Lanning	Taft	3d Cir.	January 1, 1849	May 18, 1909	February 16, 1912 (aged 63)	John Bayard McPherson	No
William Schofield	Taft	1st Cir.	February 14, 1857	June 6, 1911	June 10, 1912 (aged 55)	Frederic Dodge	No
Thomas John Morris	Hayes	D. Md.	September 24, 1837	July 1, 1879	June 6, 1912 (aged 74)	Seat abolished	n/a
John J. De Haven	McKinley	N.D. Cal.	March 12, 1845	June 8, 1897	January 26, 1913 (aged 67)	Maurice Timothy Dooling	R → D (Note: Vacancy occurred during a Republican administration, but was filled during a Democratic administration.)
James Perry Platt	T. Roosevelt	D. Conn.	March 31, 1851	February 28, 1902	January 26, 1913 (aged 61)	Edwin Stark Thomas	R → D
Joseph Cross	T. Roosevelt	D.N.J.	December 29, 1843	March 17, 1905	October 29, 1913 (aged 69)	Thomas Griffith Haight	R → D
James Scott Young	T. Roosevelt	W.D. Pa.	December 3, 1848	January 22, 1908	February 25, 1914 (aged 65)	W. H. Seward Thomson	R → D
Charles Andrew Willard	Taft	D. Minn.	May 21, 1857	May 18, 1909	March 13, 1914 (aged 56)	Wilbur F. Booth	R → D
Harry M. Clabaugh	T. Roosevelt (Note: As chief justice.)	S.C.D.C.	July 16, 1856	November 16, 1903	March 6, 1914 (aged 57)	J. Harry Covington	R → D
James Buchanan Holland	T. Roosevelt	E.D. Pa.	November 14, 1857	April 19, 1904	April 24, 1914 (aged 56)	Seat abolished	n/a
Thomas G. Jones	T. Roosevelt	M.D. Ala. N.D. Ala.	November 26, 1844	December 17, 1901	April 28, 1914 (aged 69)	Henry D. Clayton Jr.	R → D
Horace Harmon Lurton	Taft	SCOTUS	February 26, 1844	December 20, 1909	July 12, 1914 (aged 70)	James Clark McReynolds	R → D
David Davie Shelby	McKinley	5th Cir.	October 24, 1847	March 2, 1899	August 22, 1914 (aged 66)	Richard Wilde Walker Jr.	R → D
James Loren Martin	T. Roosevelt	D. Vt.	September 13, 1846	December 11, 1906	January 14, 1915 (aged 68)	Harland Bradley Howe	R → D
Smith McPherson	McKinley	S.D. Iowa	February 14, 1848	May 7, 1900	January 17, 1915 (aged 66)	Martin J. Wade	R → D
William Henry Seaman	T. Roosevelt	7th Cir.	November 15, 1842	March 1, 1905	March 8, 1915 (aged 72)	Evan Alfred Evans	R → D
William Henry Munger	Cleveland	D. Neb.	October 12, 1845	February 18, 1897	August 11, 1915 (aged 69)	Joseph William Woodrough	No
Joseph Rucker Lamar	Taft	SCOTUS	October 14, 1857	December 15, 1910	January 2, 1916 (aged 58)	Louis Brandeis	R → D
Alexander Boarman	Garfield	W.D. La.	December 10, 1839	May 18, 1881	August 30, 1916 (aged 76)	George W. Jack	R → D
William Hayes Pope	Taft	D.N.M.	June 14, 1870	February 20, 1912	September 13, 1916 (aged 46)	Colin Neblett	R → D
Thomas H. Anderson	T. Roosevelt	S.C.D.C.	June 6, 1848	February 4, 1902	October 1, 1916 (aged 68)	William Hitz	R → D
Elmer B. Adams	T. Roosevelt	8th Cir.	October 27, 1842	December 12, 1905	October 24, 1916 (aged 73)	Kimbrough Stone	R → D
Andrew Phelps McCormick	B. Harrison	5th Cir.	December 18, 1832	March 17, 1892	November 2, 1916 (aged 83)	R. L. Batts	R → D
Harry Theophilus Toulmin	Cleveland	S.D. Ala.	March 4, 1838	January 13, 1887	November 12, 1916 (aged 78)	Robert Tait Ervin	No
William Wallace Lambdin	Wilson	S.D. Ga.	October 25, 1861	March 3, 1915	December 20, 1916 (aged 55)	Beverly Daniel Evans Jr.	No
Francis Marion Wright	T. Roosevelt	E.D. Ill.	August 5, 1844	March 17, 1905	July 15, 1917 (aged 72)	George W. English	R → D
Waller Thomas Burns	T. Roosevelt	S.D. Tex.	January 14, 1858	April 24, 1902	November 17, 1917 (aged 59)	Joseph Chappell Hutcheson Jr.	R → D
Christian Cecil Kohlsaat	T. Roosevelt	7th Cir.	January 8, 1844	March 18, 1905	May 11, 1918 (aged 74)	George True Page	R → D
J. Otis Humphrey	McKinley	S.D. Ill.	December 30, 1850	March 8, 1901	June 14, 1918 (aged 67)	Louis FitzHenry	R → D
Henry Clay Niles	B. Harrison	N.D. Miss. S.D. Miss.	October 21, 1850	January 11, 1892	September 26, 1918 (aged 67)	Edwin R. Holmes	R → D
Emory Speer	Arthur	S.D. Ga.	September 3, 1848	February 18, 1885	December 13, 1918 (aged 70)	Seat abolished	n/a
John Bayard McPherson	Taft	3d Cir.	November 5, 1846	April 3, 1912	January 20, 1919 (aged 72)	Thomas Griffith Haight	R → D
Joseph T. Johnson	Wilson	W.D.S.C.	February 28, 1858	January 24, 1916	May 8, 1919 (aged 61)	Henry Hitt Watkins	No
Gordon J. Russell	Taft	E.D. Tex.	December 22, 1859	June 6, 1910	September 14, 1919 (aged 59)	William Lee Estes	R → D
Howard Clark Hollister	Taft	S.D. Ohio	September 11, 1856	March 7, 1910	September 24, 1919 (aged 63)	John Weld Peck	R → D
Don Albert Pardee	Garfield	5th Cir.	March 29, 1837	May 13, 1881	September 26, 1919 (aged 82)	Alexander Campbell King	R → D

=== 1920–1954 ===
168 United States Article III federal judges died in active service between the enactment of legislation in 1919 allowing judges over the age of 70 with more than 10 years of judicial service to serve in what later became known as senior status, and the expansion of that legislation in 1954 to cover judges over the age of 65 with more than 15 years of judicial service. Of the judges who died in office during this period, nine were justices of the Supreme Court of the United States.

Judge	Appointing president	Court	Date of birth	Confirmation date	Date of death and age	Successor	Change of party
William Truslow Newman	Cleveland	N.D. Ga.	June 23, 1843	January 13, 1887	February 14, 1920 (aged 76)	Seat abolished	n/a
Alston G. Dayton	T. Roosevelt	N.D. W.Va.	October 18, 1857	March 14, 1905	July 30, 1920 (aged 62)	William E. Baker	No
John E. McCall	T. Roosevelt	W.D. Tenn.	August 14, 1859	January 17, 1905	August 8, 1920 (aged 60)	John William Ross	No
Arthur Loomis Sanborn	T. Roosevelt	W.D. Wis.	November 17, 1850	January 9, 1905	October 18, 1920 (aged 69)	Claude Luse	No
Jeter C. Pritchard	T. Roosevelt	4th Cir.	July 12, 1857	April 27, 1904	April 10, 1921 (aged 63)	Edmund Waddill Jr.	No
Edward Douglass White	Taft	SCOTUS	November 3, 1845	December 12, 1910	May 19, 1921 (aged 75)	William Howard Taft	No
Ashley Mulgrave Gould	T. Roosevelt	S.C.D.C.	October 8, 1859	December 8, 1902	May 20, 1921 (aged 61)	Adolph A. Hoehling Jr.	No
Benjamin Franklin Keller	McKinley	S.D. W.Va.	April 21, 1857	December 17, 1901	August 8, 1921 (aged 64)	Seat abolished	n/a
William Cather Hook	T. Roosevelt	8th Cir.	September 24, 1857	November 17, 1903	August 11, 1921 (aged 63)	Robert E. Lewis	No
Edgar Aldrich	B. Harrison	D.N.H.	February 5, 1848	February 20, 1891	September 15, 1921 (aged 73)	George Franklin Morris	No
Walter I. Smith	Taft	8th Cir.	July 10, 1862	January 31, 1911	January 27, 1922 (aged 59)	William S. Kenyon	No
Beverly Daniel Evans Jr.	Wilson	S.D. Ga.	May 21, 1865	August 15, 1917	May 7, 1922 (aged 56)	William H. Barrett	D → R
Charles Prentiss Orr	Taft	W.D. Pa.	February 22, 1858	April 8, 1909	May 16, 1922 (aged 64)	Robert Murray Gibson	No
John Emmett Carland	Taft	8th Cir.	December 11, 1853	January 31, 1911	November 11, 1922 (aged 68)	Seat abolished	n/a
Thomas Chatfield	T. Roosevelt	E.D.N.Y.	October 4, 1871	January 9, 1907	December 24, 1922 (aged 51)	Robert Alexander Inch	No
Martin Augustine Knapp	Taft	4th Cir.	November 6, 1843	December 20, 1910	February 10, 1923 (aged 79)	Seat abolished	n/a
Oscar A. Trippet	Wilson	S.D. Cal.	March 6, 1856	March 3, 1915	July 15, 1923 (aged 67)	Paul John McCormick	D → R
William Cary Van Fleet	T. Roosevelt	N.D. Cal.	March 24, 1852	December 17, 1907	September 3, 1923 (aged 71)	Frank Henry Kerrigan	No
Walter Evans	McKinley	W.D. Ky.	September 18, 1842	March 3, 1899	December 30, 1923 (aged 81)	Charles Harwood Moorman	No
Francis E. Baker	T. Roosevelt	7th Cir.	October 20, 1860	January 21, 1902	March 15, 1924 (aged 63)	Albert B. Anderson	No
George W. Jack	Wilson	W.D. La.	November 1, 1875	March 16, 1917	March 15, 1924 (aged 48)	Benjamin C. Dawkins Sr.	D → R
Constantine Joseph Smyth	Wilson	D.C. Cir.	December 4, 1859	July 12, 1917	April 14, 1924 (aged 64)	George Ewing Martin	D → R
William Robert Smith	Wilson	W.D. Tex.	August 18, 1863	April 12, 1917	August 16, 1924 (aged 60)	Charles Albert Boynton	D → R
Maurice Timothy Dooling	Wilson	N.D. Cal.	October 12, 1860	July 28, 1913	November 4, 1924 (aged 64)	Adolphus Frederic St. Sure	D → R
Henry G. Connor	Taft	E.D.N.C.	July 3, 1852	May 25, 1909	November 23, 1924 (aged 72)	Isaac Melson Meekins	No
George W. Ray	T. Roosevelt	N.D.N.Y.	February 3, 1844	December 8, 1902	January 10, 1925 (aged 80)	Seat abolished	n/a
John F. McGee	Harding	D. Minn.	January 1, 1861	March 2, 1923	February 15, 1925 (aged 64)	Seat abolished	n/a
Charles Louis McKeehan	Harding	E.D. Pa.	March 29, 1876	February 9, 1923	March 23, 1925 (aged 48)	Seat abolished	n/a
Charles B. Witmer	Taft	M.D. Penn.	April 18, 1862	March 2, 1911	April 7, 1925 (aged 62)	Albert Williams Johnson	No
Charles Albert Woods	Wilson	4th Cir.	July 31, 1852	June 5, 1913	June 21, 1925 (aged 72)	John J. Parker	D → R
John William Ross	Harding	W.D. Tenn.	March 9, 1878	May 31, 1921	July 9, 1925 (aged 47)	Harry B. Anderson	No
Charlton Beattie	Coolidge	E.D. La.	April 22, 1869	January 19, 1925	August 23, 1925 (aged 56)	Louis Henry Burns	No
John Slater Partridge	Harding	N.D. Cal.	June 22, 1870	March 3, 1923	May 20, 1926 (aged 55)	Harold Louderback	No
Henry Wade Rogers	Wilson	2d Cir.	October 10, 1853	September 29, 1913	August 16, 1926 (aged 72)	Thomas Walter Swan	D → R
Charles E. Wolverton	T. Roosevelt	D. Ore.	May 16, 1851	January 10, 1906	September 21, 1926 (aged 75)	John Hugh McNary	No
John Carter Rose	Harding	4th Cir.	April 27, 1861	December 20, 1922	March 26, 1927 (aged 65)	Elliott Northcott	No
Charles Merrill Hough	Wilson	2d Cir.	May 18, 1858	August 21, 1916	April 22, 1927 (aged 68)	Augustus Noble Hand	D → R
Jacob Trieber	McKinley	E.D. Ark.	October 6, 1853	January 9, 1901	September 17, 1927 (aged 73)	John Ellis Martineau	No
Rhydon Mays Call	Wilson	S.D. Fla.	January 13, 1858	April 24, 1913	December 15, 1927 (aged 69)	Halsted L. Ritter	D → R
Walter Henry Sanborn	B. Harrison	8th Cir.	October 19, 1845	March 17, 1892	May 10, 1928 (aged 82)	John Hazelton Cotteral	No
Louis Henry Burns	Coolidge	E.D. La.	May 11, 1878	December 21, 1925	June 9, 1928 (aged 50)	Wayne G. Borah	No
Adam C. Cliffe	Harding	N.D. Ill.	June 25, 1869	December 22, 1922	June 12, 1928 (aged 58)	Charles Edgar Woodward	No
David C. Westenhaver	Wilson	N.D. Ohio	January 13, 1865	March 14, 1917	July 29, 1928 (aged 63)	Samuel H. West	D → R
Maurice H. Donahue	Wilson	6th Cir.	May 10, 1864	October 29, 1919	September 10, 1928 (aged 64)	Smith Hickenlooper	D → R
Henry D. Clayton Jr.	Wilson	M.D. Ala. N.D. Ala.	February 10, 1857	May 2, 1914	December 21, 1929 (aged 72)	Charles Brents Kennamer	D → R
Edward Terry Sanford	Harding	SCOTUS	July 23, 1865	January 29, 1923	March 8, 1930 (aged 64)	Owen Roberts	No
Lake Jones	Coolidge	S.D. Fla.	February 10, 1867	February 18, 1924	June 7, 1930 (aged 63)	Seat abolished	n/a
William Lee Estes	Wilson	E.D. Tex.	October 18, 1870	February 18, 1920	June 14, 1930 (aged 59)	Randolph Bryant	D → R
Frank Sigel Dietrich	Coolidge	9th Cir.	January 23, 1863	January 3, 1927	October 2, 1930 (aged 67)	William Henry Sawtelle	No
Robert S. Bean	Taft	D. Ore.	November 28, 1854	April 28, 1909	January 7, 1931 (aged 76)	James Alger Fee	No
Clarence W. Sessions	Taft	W.D. Mich.	February 8, 1859	March 2, 1911	April 1, 1931 (aged 72)	Arthur Carter Denison	No
Edmund Waddill Jr.	Harding	4th Cir.	May 22, 1855	June 2, 1921	April 9, 1931 (aged 75)	Morris Ames Soper	No
Martin J. Wade	Wilson	S.D. Iowa	October 20, 1861	March 3, 1915	April 16, 1931 (aged 69)	Seat abolished	n/a
William Ball Gilbert	B. Harrison	9th Cir.	July 4, 1847	March 18, 1892	April 27, 1931 (aged 83)	William Denman	No
Frank H. Rudkin	Harding	9th Cir.	April 23, 1864	January 9, 1923	May 3, 1931 (aged 67)	Francis Arthur Garrecht	No
Frederick Lincoln Siddons	Wilson	S.C.D.C.	November 21, 1864	January 15, 1915	June 19, 1931 (aged 66)	Daniel William O'Donoghue	D → R
William Nelson Runyon	Harding	D.N.J.	March 5, 1871	January 16, 1923	November 9, 1931 (aged 60)	Phillip Forman	No
Frank A. Youmans	Taft	W.D. Ark.	May 23, 1860	June 20, 1911	April 11, 1932 (aged 71)	Heartsill Ragon	R → D
Claude Luse	Harding	W.D. Wis.	February 23, 1879	April 27, 1921	May 28, 1932 (aged 53)	Patrick Thomas Stone	R → D
William Alexander Cant	Harding	D. Minn.	December 23, 1863	January 15, 1924	January 12, 1933 (aged 69)	Robert C. Bell	R → D
James Douglas Elliott	Taft	D.S.D.	October 7, 1859	June 7, 1911	January 30, 1933 (aged 73)	Seat abolished	n/a
John Hazelton Cotteral	Coolidge	10th Cir.	September 26, 1864	May 23, 1928	April 22, 1933 (aged 68)	Sam G. Bratton	R → D
William S. Kenyon	Harding	8th Cir.	June 10, 1869	January 31, 1922	September 9, 1933 (aged 64)	Charles Breckenridge Faris	R → D
James Arnold Lowell	Harding	D. Mass.	February 5, 1869	September 22, 1922	November 30, 1933 (aged 64)	George Clinton Sweeney	R → D
Smith Hickenlooper	Coolidge	6th Cir.	February 13, 1880	December 17, 1928	December 22, 1933 (aged 53)	Florence E. Allen	R → D
Ernest Ford Cochran	Coolidge	E.D.S.C.	September 12, 1865	January 17, 1924	March 4, 1934 (aged 68)	Francis Kerschner Myers	R → D
Frank Joseph Coleman	Coolidge	S.D.N.Y.	March 24, 1886	December 19, 1927	March 14, 1934 (aged 47)	George Murray Hulbert	R → D
William Bostwick Sheppard	T. Roosevelt	N.D. Fla.	October 4, 1860	May 20, 1908	April 21, 1934 (aged 73)	Augustus V. Long	R → D
Simon L. Adler	Coolidge	W.D.N.Y	August 30, 1867	January 16, 1928	May 23, 1934 (aged 66)	Harlan W. Rippey	R → D
Andrew McConnell January Cochran	McKinley	E.D. Ky.	February 4, 1854	December 17, 1901	June 12, 1934 (aged 80)	Hiram Church Ford	R → D
William Henry Sawtelle	Hoover	9th Cir.	August 27, 1868	January 22, 1931	December 17, 1934 (aged 66)	Clifton Mathews	R → D
Frank Henry Kerrigan	Coolidge	N.D. Cal.	September 17, 1868	January 28, 1924	February 9, 1935 (aged 66)	Michael Joseph Roche	R → D
Harry B. Anderson	Coolidge	W.D. Tenn.	November 5, 1879	January 29, 1926	April 9, 1935 (aged 55)	John Donelson Martin Sr.	R → D
William Hitz	Hoover	D.C. Cir.	April 21, 1872	January 28, 1931	July 3, 1935 (aged 63)	Harold Montelle Stephens	R → D
Nathan P. Bryan	Wilson	5th Cir.	April 23, 1872	April 23, 1920	August 8, 1935 (aged 63)	Edwin R. Holmes	No
James Edmund Boyd	McKinley	W.D.N.C.	February 14, 1845	January 9, 1901	August 21, 1935 (aged 90)	Seat abolished	n/a
William Irwin Grubb	Taft	N.D. Ala.	March 8, 1862	May 18, 1909	October 27, 1935 (aged 73)	David Jackson Davis	R → D
Louis FitzHenry	F.D. Roosevelt	7th Cir.	June 13, 1870	June 10, 1933	November 18, 1935 (aged 65)	James Earl Major	No
Benson W. Hough	Coolidge	S.D. Ohio	March 5, 1875	February 9, 1925	November 19, 1935 (aged 60)	Mell G. Underwood	R → D
John Hugh McNary	Coolidge	D. Ore.	January 31, 1867	February 28, 1927	October 25, 1936 (aged 69)	Claude C. McColloch	R → D
George Thomas McDermott	Hoover	10th Cir.	October 21, 1886	April 29, 1929	January 19, 1937 (aged 50)	Robert L. Williams	R → D
John Calvin Pollock	T. Roosevelt	D. Kan.	October 5, 1857	December 1, 1903	January 24, 1937 (aged 79)	Seat abolished	n/a
George Philip Hahn	Coolidge	N.D. Ohio	June 26, 1879	December 17, 1928	February 12, 1937 (aged 57)	Frank Le Blond Kloeb	R → D
John Ellis Martineau	Coolidge	E.D. Ark.	December 2, 1873	March 2, 1928	March 6, 1937 (aged 63)	Thomas Clark Trimble III	R → D
Josiah Alexander Van Orsdel	T. Roosevelt	D.C. Cir.	November 17, 1860	December 12, 1907	August 7, 1937 (aged 76)	Justin Miller	R → D
Charles Harwood Moorman	Coolidge	6th Cir.	April 24, 1876	January 13, 1925	January 26, 1938 (aged 61)	Elwood Hamilton	R → D
John Lyles Glenn Jr.	Hoover	E.D.S.C. W.D.S.C.	April 2, 1892	April 29, 1929	May 2, 1938 (aged 46)	Alva M. Lumpkin	R → D
Benjamin N. Cardozo	Hoover	SCOTUS	May 24, 1870	February 24, 1932	July 9, 1938 (aged 68)	Felix Frankfurter	R → D
Samuel H. West	Coolidge	N.D. Ohio	July 17, 1872	December 17, 1928	October 5, 1938 (aged 66)	Robert Nugen Wilkin	R → D
David Jackson Davis	F.D. Roosevelt	N.D. Ala.	October 15, 1878	January 22, 1936	December 7, 1938 (aged 60)	Seat abolished	n/a
John J. Gore	Harding	M.D. Tenn.	April 28, 1878	March 2, 1923	February 21, 1939 (aged 60)	Elmer David Davies	R → D
Joseph Winston Cox	Hoover	D.D.C.	October 19, 1875	July 1, 1930	September 9, 1939 (aged 63)	David Andrew Pine	R → D
Oliver Booth Dickinson	Wilson	E.D. Pa.	September 25, 1857	April 28, 1914	September 16, 1939 (aged 81)	Guy K. Bard	No
Pierce Butler	Harding	SCOTUS	March 17, 1866	December 21, 1922	November 16, 1939 (aged 73)	Frank Murphy	R → D
William P. James	Harding	S.D. Cal.	January 10, 1870	March 3, 1923	July 28, 1940 (aged 70)	James Francis Thaddeus O'Connor	R → D
Francis Kerschner Myers	F.D. Roosevelt	E.D.S.C.	March 7, 1874	June 9, 1934	August 2, 1940 (aged 66)	Julius Waties Waring	No
Heartsill Ragon	F.D. Roosevelt	W.D. Ark.	March 20, 1885	May 12, 1933	September 15, 1940 (aged 55)	John E. Miller	No
Herschel W. Arant	F.D. Roosevelt	6th Cir.	July 18, 1887	February 21, 1939	January 14, 1941 (aged 53)	Thomas Francis McAllister	No
Walter Emanuel Treanor	F.D. Roosevelt	7th Cir.	November 17, 1883	December 21, 1937	April 26, 1941 (aged 57)	Sherman Minton	No
William H. Barrett	Harding	S.D. Ga.	September 10, 1866	June 22, 1922	May 1, 1941 (aged 74)	Archibald Battle Lovett	R → D
Robert Johnston McMillan	Hoover	W.D. Tex.	August 21, 1885	January 12, 1932	October 27, 1941 (aged 56)	Walter Angus Keeling	R → D
Harold Louderback	Coolidge	N.D. Cal.	January 30, 1881	April 17, 1928	December 11, 1941 (aged 60)	Louis Earl Goodman	R → D
Charles Edgar Woodward	Coolidge	N.D. Ill.	December 1, 1876	March 2, 1929	May 15, 1942 (aged 65)	Elwyn R. Shaw	R → D
Rufus Edward Foster	Coolidge	5th Cir.	May 22, 1871	January 13, 1925	August 23, 1942 (aged 71)	Elmo Pearce Lee	R → D
Charles B. Davis	Coolidge	E.D. Mo.	March 9, 1877	January 31, 1924	March 3, 1943 (aged 65)	Rubey Mosley Hulen	R → D
Richard Joseph Hopkins	Hoover	D. Kan.	April 4, 1873	December 19, 1929	August 28, 1943 (aged 70)	Guy T. Helvering	R → D
Bert E. Haney	F.D. Roosevelt	9th Cir.	April 10, 1879	August 23, 1935	September 18, 1943 (aged 64)	Homer Bone	No
Luther B. Way	Hoover	E.D. Va.	September 26, 1879	March 2, 1931	October 23, 1943 (aged 64)	Charles Sterling Hutcheson	R → D
John Boyd Avis	Hoover	D.N.J.	July 11, 1875	October 2, 1929	January 21, 1944 (aged 68)	Thomas M. Madden	R → D
George F. Sullivan	F.D. Roosevelt	D. Minn.	January 30, 1886	August 17, 1937	April 14, 1944 (aged 58)	Dennis F. Donovan	No
Marcus Beach Campbell	Harding	E.D.N.Y.	November 18, 1866	January 3, 1923	August 3, 1944 (aged 77)	Harold Maurice Kennedy	R → D
Oscar Raymond Luhring	Hoover	D.D.C.	February 11, 1879	July 3, 1930	August 18, 1944 (aged 65)	Henry Albert Schweinhaut	R → D
Bascom Sine Deaver	Coolidge	M.D. Ga.	November 26, 1882	March 19, 1928	October 13, 1944 (aged 61)	Thomas Hoyt Davis	R → D
James H. Baldwin	F.D. Roosevelt	D. Mont.	August 1, 1876	May 29, 1935	October 26, 1944 (aged 68)	R. Lewis Brown	No
Edward C. Eicher	F.D. Roosevelt	D.D.C.	December 16, 1878	January 20, 1942	November 30, 1944 (aged 65)	Bolitha James Laws	No
Arthur J. Tuttle	Taft	E.D. Mich.	November 8, 1868	August 6, 1912	December 2, 1944 (aged 76)	Arthur A. Koscinski	R → D
Merrill E. Otis	Coolidge	W.D. Mo.	July 7, 1884	December 14, 1925	December 23, 1944 (aged 60)	Albert Alphonso Ridge	R → D
Walter Angus Keeling	F.D. Roosevelt	W.D. Tex.	November 22, 1873	January 26, 1942	January 22, 1945 (aged 71)	Ben Herbert Rice Jr.	No
Ralph E. Jenney	F.D. Roosevelt	S.D. Cal.	February 20, 1883	June 29, 1937	July 13, 1945 (aged 62)	William Carey Mathes	No
Frederick Howard Bryant	Coolidge	N.D.N.Y.	July 25, 1877	December 19, 1927	September 4, 1945 (aged 68)	Edward S. Kampf	R → D
Frederic Palen Schoonmaker	Harding	W.D. Pa.	March 11, 1870	December 22, 1922	September 5, 1945 (aged 75)	Wallace Samuel Gourley	R → D
Thomas Alexander Murphree	F.D. Roosevelt	N.D. Ala.	December 1, 1883	May 17, 1938	September 5, 1945 (aged 61)	Seybourn Harris Lynne	No
Elwood Hamilton	F.D. Roosevelt	6th Cir.	February 22, 1883	March 1, 1938	September 19, 1945 (aged 62)	Shackelford Miller Jr.	No
Archibald Battle Lovett	F.D. Roosevelt	S.D. Ga.	June 21, 1884	October 2, 1941	December 28, 1945 (aged 61)	Francis Muir Scarlett	No
Harry Aaron Hollzer	Hoover	S.D. Cal.	November 4, 1880	February 27, 1931	January 14, 1946 (aged 65)	Jacob Weinberger	R → D
Fred Morton Raymond	Coolidge	W.D. Mich.	March 22, 1876	December 18, 1925	February 6, 1946 (aged 69)	Raymond Wesley Starr	R → D
Harlan F. Stone	F.D. Roosevelt	SCOTUS	October 11, 1872	June 27, 1941	April 22, 1946 (aged 73)	Fred M. Vinson	No
Guy T. Helvering	F.D. Roosevelt	D. Kan.	January 10, 1878	September 28, 1943	July 4, 1946 (aged 68)	Seat abolished	n/a
Samuel Mandelbaum	F.D. Roosevelt	S.D.N.Y.	September 20, 1884	June 20, 1936	November 20, 1946 (aged 62)	Harold Medina	No
Adrian Joseph Caillouet	F.D. Roosevelt	E.D. La.	February 19, 1883	April 9, 1940	December 19, 1946 (aged 63)	Herbert William Christenberry	No
Grover M. Moscowitz	Coolidge	E.D.N.Y.	August 31, 1886	December 21, 1925	March 31, 1947 (aged 60)	Leo F. Rayfiel	R → D
John Bright	F.D. Roosevelt	S.D.N.Y.	May 23, 1884	June 3, 1941	March 24, 1948 (aged 63)	Samuel H. Kaufman	No
R. Lewis Brown	F.D. Roosevelt	D. Mont.	May 25, 1892	March 27, 1945	April 2, 1948 (aged 55)	William Daniel Murray	No
Evan Alfred Evans	Wilson	7th Cir.	March 19, 1876	May 10, 1916	July 7, 1948 (aged 72)	F. Ryan Duffy	No
Francis Arthur Garrecht	F.D. Roosevelt	9th Cir.	September 11, 1870	May 16, 1933	August 11, 1948 (aged 77)	Walter Lyndon Pope	No
Arthur Daniel Healey	F.D. Roosevelt	D. Mass.	December 29, 1889	December 16, 1941	September 16, 1948 (aged 58)	William T. McCarthy	No
Ernest Aloysius O'Brien	Hoover	E.D. Mich.	July 1, 1880	March 2, 1931	October 9, 1948 (aged 68)	Thomas Patrick Thornton	R → D
Frank Murphy	F.D. Roosevelt	SCOTUS	April 13, 1890	January 16, 1940	July 19, 1949 (aged 59)	Tom C. Clark	No
James Patrick Leamy	F.D. Roosevelt	D. Vt.	January 16, 1892	April 30, 1940	July 22, 1949 (aged 57)	Ernest W. Gibson Jr.	No
Elmo Pearce Lee	F.D. Roosevelt	5th Cir.	February 10, 1882	November 30, 1943	July 26, 1949 (aged 67)	Wayne G. Borah	No
Wiley Rutledge	F.D. Roosevelt	SCOTUS	July 20, 1894	February 8, 1943	September 10, 1949 (aged 55)	Sherman Minton	No
James Francis Thaddeus O'Connor	F.D. Roosevelt	S.D. Cal.	November 10, 1886	September 19, 1940	September 28, 1949 (aged 62)	William Matthew Byrne Sr.	No
Bower Slack Broaddus	F.D. Roosevelt	E.D. Okla. N.D. Okla. W.D. Okla.	May 30, 1888	September 27, 1940	December 10, 1949 (aged 61)	William Robert Wallace	No
John Joseph O'Connell	Truman	3d Cir.	September 8, 1894	October 3, 1945	December 16, 1949 (aged 55)	Austin Leander Staley	No
George Murray Hulbert	F.D. Roosevelt	S.D.N.Y.	May 14, 1881	June 14, 1934	April 26, 1950 (aged 68)	Edward Jordan Dimock	No
Curtis L. Waller	F.D. Roosevelt	5th Cir.	January 9, 1887	March 9, 1943	July 11, 1950 (aged 63)	Louie Willard Strum	No
Elwyn R. Shaw	F.D. Roosevelt	N.D. Ill.	October 19, 1888	May 3, 1944	July 18, 1950 (aged 61)	Joseph Sam Perry	No
Lloyd Llewellyn Black	F.D. Roosevelt	E.D. Wash. W.D. Wash.	March 15, 1889	August 4, 1939	August 23, 1950 (aged 61)	William James Lindberg	No
John McDuffie	F.D. Roosevelt	S.D. Ala.	September 25, 1883	February 7, 1935	November 1, 1950 (aged 67)	Daniel Holcombe Thomas	No
Herbert Wilson Erskine	Truman	N.D. Cal.	August 27, 1888	February 25, 1949	March 18, 1951 (aged 62)	Monroe Mark Friedman	No
Randolph Bryant	Hoover	E.D. Tex.	May 2, 1893	January 13, 1931	April 24, 1951 (aged 57)	Joseph Warren Sheehy	R → D
Thomas Alan Goldsborough	F.D. Roosevelt	D.D.C.	September 16, 1877	February 16, 1939	June 16, 1951 (aged 73)	Luther Youngdahl	No
Howard C. Speakman	Truman	D. Ariz.	May 25, 1892	April 9, 1946	June 17, 1952 (aged 60)	James Augustine Walsh	No
Owen McIntosh Burns	Truman	W.D. Pa.	September 6, 1892	March 8, 1950	October 26, 1952 (aged 60)	Joseph Putnam Willson	D → R
Otto Kerner Sr.	F.D. Roosevelt	7th Cir.	February 22, 1884	February 1, 1939	December 13, 1952 (aged 68)	Elmer Jacob Schnackenberg	D → R
Robert Reasoner Nevin	Coolidge	S.D. Ohio	August 2, 1875	January 21, 1929	December 31, 1952 (aged 77)	Mell G. Underwood	No
Gaston Louis Noel Porterie	F.D. Roosevelt	W.D. La.	January 22, 1885	February 1, 1939	March 24, 1953 (aged 68)	Edwin F. Hunter	D → R
William Alvah Stewart	Truman	W.D. Pa.	August 16, 1903	April 24, 1951	April 9, 1953 (aged 49)	John Lester Miller	D → R
Edward L. Leahy	Truman	D.R.I.	February 9, 1886	January 2, 1951	July 22, 1953 (aged 67)	Edward William Day	D → R
Walter Garrett Riddick	F.D. Roosevelt	8th Cir.	September 13, 1883	December 16, 1941	July 31, 1953 (aged 69)	Charles Joseph Vogel	D → R
Fred M. Vinson	Truman	SCOTUS	January 22, 1890	June 20, 1946	September 8, 1953 (aged 63)	Earl Warren	D → R
James McPherson Proctor	Truman	D.C. Cir.	September 4, 1882	March 2, 1948	September 17, 1953 (aged 71)	John A. Danaher	D → R
Abraham Benjamin Conger	Truman	M.D. Ga.	July 14, 1887	June 2, 1949	December 9, 1953 (aged 66)	William Augustus Bootle	D → R
Alfred Lee Wyman	Hoover	D.S.D.	December 9, 1874	May 10, 1929	December 15, 1953 (aged 79)	Seat abolished	n/a
Bennett Champ Clark	Truman	D.C. Cir.	January 8, 1890	September 24, 1945	July 13, 1954 (aged 64)	Walter M. Bastian	D → R
Louie Willard Strum	Truman	5th Cir.	January 16, 1890	September 23, 1950	July 26, 1954 (aged 64)	Warren Leroy Jones	D → R
Robert H. Jackson	F.D. Roosevelt	SCOTUS	February 13, 1892	July 7, 1941	October 9, 1954 (aged 62)	John Marshall Harlan II	D → R
Campbell E. Beaumont	F.D. Roosevelt	S.D. Cal.	August 27, 1883	August 1, 1939	November 19, 1954 (aged 71)	Gilbert H. Jertberg	D → R

=== 1954–present ===
As of January 2025, 241 United States Article III federal judges have died in active service since the 1954 expansion of senior status to cover judges over the age of 65 with more than 15 years of judicial service. Although this is the largest number of judges to die over such a period of time, it is the lowest percentage, due to substantial expansions of the judiciary branch. Notably, only three United States Supreme Court justices have died in office in that period, whereas 48 had died in office over the preceding periods.

Judge	Appointing president	Court	Date of birth	Confirmation date	Date of death and age	Successor	Change of party
Robert Lee Russell	Truman	5th Cir.	August 19, 1900	October 19, 1949	January 18, 1955 (aged 54)	John Robert Brown	D → R
Harold Montelle Stephens	Truman	D.C. Cir.	March 6, 1886	March 2, 1948	May 28, 1955 (aged 69)	Warren E. Burger	D → R
Charles Brents Kennamer	Hoover	M.D. Ala.	November 25, 1874	February 20, 1931	June 3, 1955 (aged 80)	Frank Minis Johnson	No
John Knight	Hoover	W.D.N.Y.	April 29, 1871	January 6, 1932	June 15, 1955 (aged 84)	Justin C. Morgan	No
Emerich B. Freed	F.D. Roosevelt	N.D. Ohio	November 22, 1897	October 2, 1941	December 4, 1955 (aged 58)	Paul Charles Weick	D → R
John Caskie Collet	Truman	8th Cir.	May 25, 1898	July 8, 1947	December 5, 1955 (aged 57)	Charles Evans Whittaker	D → R
J. Leroy Adair	F.D. Roosevelt	S.D. Ill.	February 23, 1887	April 20, 1937	January 19, 1956 (aged 68)	Frederick Olen Mercer	D → R
James A. Donohoe	F.D. Roosevelt	D. Neb.	August 9, 1877	April 20, 1933	February 26, 1956 (aged 78)	Richard Earl Robinson	D → R
Rubey Mosley Hulen	F.D. Roosevelt	E.D. Mo.	July 9, 1894	July 8, 1943	July 7, 1956 (aged 61)	Randolph Henry Weber	D → R
William A. Ekwall	F.D. Roosevelt	Cust. Ct.	June 14, 1887	February 9, 1942	October 16, 1956 (aged 69)	Scovel Richardson	D → R
John David Clifford Jr.	Truman	D. Me.	May 15, 1887	March 14, 1947	November 18, 1956 (aged 69)	Edward Thaxter Gignoux	D → R
William F. Riley	Truman	S.D. Iowa	March 20, 1884	December 14, 1950	December 29, 1956 (aged 72)	Edwin Richley Hicklin	D → R
Elmer David Davies	F.D. Roosevelt	M.D. Tenn.	January 12, 1899	July 12, 1939	January 7, 1957 (aged 57)	Seat abolished	n/a
Jerome Frank	F.D. Roosevelt	2d Cir.	September 10, 1889	March 20, 1941	January 13, 1957 (aged 67)	Leonard P. Moore	D → R
Hardress Nathaniel Swaim	Truman	7th Cir.	November 30, 1890	February 8, 1950	July 30, 1957 (aged 66)	William Lynn Parkinson	D → R
Alfred Egidio Modarelli	Truman	D.N.J.	November 27, 1898	January 2, 1951	September 22, 1957 (aged 58)	Mendon Morrill	D → R
Arthur Johnson Mellott	Truman	D. Kan.	August 30, 1888	November 27, 1945	December 29, 1957 (aged 69)	Arthur Jehu Stanley Jr.	D → R
Walter C. Lindley	Truman	7th Cir.	July 12, 1880	October 12, 1949	January 3, 1958 (aged 77)	Winfred George Knoch	D → R
Lamar John Ryan Cecil	Eisenhower	E.D. Tex.	November 2, 1902	December 2, 1954	February 14, 1958 (aged 55)	Joseph Jefferson Fisher	No
James Robert Kirkland	Truman	D.D.C.	February 15, 1903	March 8, 1950	February 25, 1958 (aged 55)	George Luzerne Hart Jr.	D → R
John J. Parker	Coolidge	4th Cir.	November 20, 1885	December 14, 1925	March 17, 1958 (aged 72)	Simon Sobeloff	No
Dal Millington Lemmon	Eisenhower	9th Cir.	October 29, 1887	April 27, 1954	April 26, 1958 (aged 70)	Gilbert H. Jertberg	No
Samuel Marion Driver	Truman	E.D. Wash.	May 22, 1892	April 9, 1946	September 12, 1958 (aged 66)	Charles Lawrence Powell	D → R
Ben Moore	F.D. Roosevelt	S.D. W.Va.	January 1, 1891	March 20, 1941	September 25, 1958 (aged 67)	John A. Field Jr.	D → R
Bolitha James Laws	F.D. Roosevelt	D.D.C.	August 22, 1891	February 22, 1945	November 14, 1958 (aged 67)	Leonard Patrick Walsh	D → R
Edward Preston Murphy	Truman	N.D. Cal.	March 13, 1904	December 13, 1950	December 13, 1958 (aged 54)	William Thomas Sweigert	D → R
Philip J. Finnegan	Truman	7th Cir.	June 25, 1886	May 3, 1949	January 4, 1959 (aged 72)	Latham Castle	D → R
Justin C. Morgan	Eisenhower	W.D.N.Y.	July 8, 1900	March 6, 1956	May 24, 1959 (aged 58)	John Oliver Henderson	No
James Alger Fee	Eisenhower	9th Cir.	September 24, 1888	April 23, 1954	August 25, 1959 (aged 70)	Montgomery Oliver Koelsch	No
James V. Allred	Truman	S.D. Tex.	March 29, 1899	October 12, 1949	September 24, 1959 (aged 60)	Reynaldo Guerra Garza	D → R
William Lynn Parkinson	Eisenhower	7th Cir.	September 18, 1902	August 22, 1957	October 26, 1959 (aged 57) (Note: Parkinson disappeared on October 26, 1959; his body was found in Lake Michigan six months later. He is presumed to have died on the day of his disappearance.)	Roger Kiley	R → D
William Lee Knous	Truman	D. Colo.	February 2, 1889	April 4, 1950	December 12, 1959 (aged 70)	Olin Hatfield Chilson	D → R
Philip Leo Sullivan	F.D. Roosevelt	N.D. Ill.	October 2, 1889	February 20, 1934	June 12, 1960 (aged 70)	James Benton Parsons	No
William Robert Wallace	Truman	E.D. Okla. N.D. Okla. W.D. Okla.	February 21, 1886	June 2, 1950	June 24, 1960 (aged 74)	Luther L. Bohanon	No
Roby C. Thompson	Eisenhower	W.D. Va.	March 30, 1898	August 28, 1957	July 29, 1960 (aged 62)	Thomas J. Michie	R → D
Benjamin Harrison	F.D. Roosevelt	S.D. Cal.	December 18, 1888	June 22, 1940	August 13, 1960 (aged 71)	Albert Lee Stephens Jr.	No
James Ward Morris	F.D. Roosevelt	D.D.C.	November 14, 1890	June 15, 1939	November 15, 1960 (aged 70)	Spottswood William Robinson III	No
Mendon Morrill	Eisenhower	D.N.J.	September 18, 1902	April 22, 1958	March 12, 1961 (aged 58)	James Aloysius Coolahan	R → D
Ernest Allen Tolin	Truman	S.D. Cal.	August 2, 1904	June 10, 1952	June 11, 1961 (aged 56)	Elisha Avery Crary	No
Thomas C. Egan	Eisenhower	E.D. Pa.	July 15, 1894	August 22, 1957	July 6, 1961 (aged 66)	John Morgan Davis	R → D
Louis Earl Goodman	F.D. Roosevelt	N.D. Cal.	January 2, 1892	December 15, 1942	September 15, 1961 (aged 69)	Stanley Alexander Weigel	No
Randolph Henry Weber	Eisenhower	E.D. Mo.	November 26, 1909	March 14, 1957	November 23, 1961 (aged 51)	John Keating Regan	R → D
Randle Jasper Smith	Eisenhower	W.D. Mo.	July 25, 1908	July 2, 1956	January 8, 1962 (aged 53)	Floyd Robert Gibson	R → D
Ashton Hilliard Williams	Truman	E.D.S.C.	August 15, 1891	July 2, 1952	February 25, 1962 (aged 70)	Charles Earl Simons Jr.	No
John W. Murphy	Truman	M.D. Penn.	April 26, 1902	May 21, 1946	March 28, 1962 (aged 59)	William Joseph Nealon Jr.	No
John Donelson Martin Sr.	F.D. Roosevelt	6th Cir.	May 4, 1883	August 27, 1940	April 2, 1962 (aged 78)	Thomas Francis McAllister	No
Irvin C. Mollison	Truman	Cust. Ct.	December 24, 1898	October 26, 1945	May 5, 1962 (aged 63)	Philip Nichols Jr.	No
Herbert Funk Goodrich	F.D. Roosevelt	3d Cir.	July 29, 1889	May 7, 1940	June 25, 1962 (aged 72)	Abraham Lincoln Freedman	No
Patrick Thomas Stone	F.D. Roosevelt	W.D. Wis.	June 21, 1889	June 10, 1933	January 13, 1963 (aged 73)	David Rabinovitz	No
Julius Howard Miner	Eisenhower	N.D. Ill.	May 25, 1896	February 25, 1958	March 13, 1963 (aged 66)	Abraham Lincoln Marovitz	R → D
John Rolly Ross	Eisenhower	D. Nev.	March 1, 1899	May 13, 1954	April 22, 1963 (aged 64)	Bruce Rutherford Thompson	R → D
Jed Johnson	Truman	Cust. Ct.	July 31, 1888	June 23, 1947	May 8, 1963 (aged 74)	James Lopez Watson	No
Alexander Bicks	Eisenhower	S.D.N.Y.	March 17, 1901	May 11, 1954	May 9, 1963 (aged 62)	Charles Henry Tenney	R → D
Harry Evans Watkins	F.D. Roosevelt	N.D. W.Va. S.D. W.Va.	November 6, 1898	March 2, 1937	June 6, 1963 (aged 64)	Sidney Lee Christie	No
John Wilson McIlvaine	Eisenhower	W.D. Pa.	June 22, 1907	July 29, 1955	July 1, 1963 (aged 56)	Gerald Joseph Weber	R → D
Arthur Marshall Davis	Kennedy	D. Ariz.	June 7, 1907	August 21, 1961	July 11, 1963 (aged 56)	Walter Early Craig	No
Charles Edward Clark	F.D. Roosevelt	2d Cir.	December 9, 1889	March 7, 1939	December 13, 1963 (aged 74)	Robert P. Anderson	No
Waldo Henry Rogers	Eisenhower	D.N.M.	May 17, 1908	May 13, 1954	January 12, 1964 (aged 55)	Howard C. Bratton	R → D
Ben Herbert Rice Jr.	Truman	W.D. Tex.	December 12, 1889	September 19, 1945	March 14, 1964 (aged 74)	Dorwin Wallace Suttle	No
Benjamin Franklin Cameron	Eisenhower	5th Cir.	December 14, 1890	March 14, 1955	April 3, 1964 (aged 73)	James P. Coleman	R → D
Gregory Francis Noonan	Truman	S.D.N.Y.	May 12, 1906	April 25, 1950	May 1, 1964 (aged 57)	Marvin E. Frankel	No
Charles Joseph McNamee	Truman	N.D. Ohio	December 5, 1890	March 6, 1951	May 2, 1964 (aged 73)	Seat abolished	n/a
Archie Owen Dawson	Eisenhower	S.D.N.Y.	October 9, 1898	April 23, 1954	August 3, 1964 (aged 65)	Constance Baker Motley	R → D
Charles Ferguson Paul	Eisenhower	N.D. W.Va.	April 26, 1902	March 1, 1960	February 17, 1965 (aged 62)	Robert Earl Maxwell	R → D
George T. Mickelson	Eisenhower	D.S.D.	July 23, 1903	February 9, 1954	February 28, 1965 (aged 61)	Fred Joseph Nichol	R → D
Sidney Carr Mize	F.D. Roosevelt	S.D. Miss.	March 7, 1888	February 2, 1937	April 26, 1965 (aged 77)	Dan Monroe Russell Jr.	No
Paul Jones	Harding	N.D. Ohio	November 4, 1880	March 2, 1923	August 4, 1965 (aged 84)	William Kernahan Thomas	R → D
Casper Platt	Truman	E.D. Ill.	June 6, 1892	October 12, 1949	September 16, 1965 (aged 73)	Henry Seiler Wise	No
Frederick Olen Mercer	Eisenhower	S.D. Ill.	March 11, 1901	June 13, 1956	April 3, 1966 (aged 65)	Robert Dale Morgan	R → D
Charles Cecil Wyche	F.D. Roosevelt	D.S.C.	July 7, 1885	January 22, 1937	September 17, 1966 (aged 81)	Donald S. Russell	No
Isaac Jack Martin	Eisenhower	CCPA	July 18, 1908	August 5, 1958	November 5, 1966 (aged 58)	Phillip Baldwin	R → D
Joseph Warren Sheehy	Truman	E.D. Tex.	October 21, 1910	June 7, 1951	February 23, 1967 (aged 56)	William Wayne Justice	No
J. Spencer Bell	Kennedy	4th Cir.	April 1, 1906	September 23, 1961	March 19, 1967 (aged 60)	John D. Butzner Jr.	No
Aloysius Joseph Connor	F.D. Roosevelt	D.N.H.	April 13, 1895	December 5, 1944	December 18, 1967 (aged 72)	Hugh H. Bownes	No
William Francis Smith	Kennedy	3d Cir.	February 24, 1903	August 30, 1961	February 26, 1968 (aged 65)	James Hunter III	D → R
Elmer Jacob Schnackenberg	Eisenhower	7th Cir.	August 22, 1889	February 9, 1954	September 15, 1968 (aged 79)	John Paul Stevens	No
Arthur Mumford Smith	Eisenhower	CCPA	September 19, 1903	April 29, 1959	November 20, 1968 (aged 65)	Donald Edward Lane	No
Ross Rizley	Eisenhower	W.D. Okla.	July 5, 1892	March 1, 1956	March 4, 1969 (aged 76)	Seat abolished	n/a
Claude Feemster Clayton	L.B. Johnson	5th Cir.	August 4, 1909	October 26, 1967	July 4, 1969 (aged 59)	Charles Clark	D → R
Gordon Elmo Young	Eisenhower	E.D. Ark.	April 26, 1907	September 2, 1959	August 20, 1969 (aged 62)	Garnett Thomas Eisele	No
William Bernard Herlands	Eisenhower	S.D.N.Y.	July 19, 1905	June 26, 1956	August 28, 1969 (aged 64)	Lawrence W. Pierce	No
Ernest W. Gibson Jr.	Truman	D. Vt.	March 6, 1901	October 15, 1949	November 4, 1969 (aged 68)	James L. Oakes	D → R
Fred Kunzel	Eisenhower	S.D. Cal.	June 2, 1901	September 9, 1959	November 19, 1969 (aged 68)	Edward Joseph Schwartz	No
Thaddeus M. Machrowicz	Kennedy	E.D. Mich.	August 21, 1899	September 1, 1961	February 17, 1970 (aged 70)	Cornelia Groefsema Kennedy	D → R
David Henry Stahl	L.B. Johnson	3d Cir.	May 29, 1920	October 10, 1968	February 21, 1970 (aged 49)	Max Rosenn	D → R
Joe Hickey	L.B. Johnson	10th Cir.	August 22, 1911	June 9, 1966	September 22, 1970 (aged 59)	James E. Barrett	D → R
Theodore Levin	Truman	E.D. Mich.	February 18, 1897	July 25, 1946	December 31, 1970 (aged 73)	Robert Edward DeMascio	D → R
Abraham Lincoln Freedman	L.B. Johnson	3d Cir.	November 19, 1904	July 2, 1964	March 13, 1971 (aged 66)	Joseph F. Weis Jr.	D → R
Gerald Sanford Levin	Nixon	N.D. Cal.	January 1, 1906	July 11, 1969	June 5, 1971 (aged 65)	Charles Byron Renfrew	No
Joseph Patrick Lieb	Eisenhower	M.D. Fla.	September 4, 1901	March 1, 1956	November 2, 1971 (aged 70)	William Terrell Hodges	No
Ted Cabot	L.B. Johnson	S.D. Fla.	February 5, 1917	August 10, 1966	December 4, 1971 (aged 54)	Norman Charles Roettger Jr.	D → R
Edwin Monroe Stanley	Eisenhower	M.D.N.C.	March 9, 1909	February 25, 1958	December 23, 1971 (aged 62)	Hiram Hamilton Ward	No
Henry Luesing Brooks	Nixon	6th Cir.	December 9, 1905	December 10, 1969	December 30, 1971 (aged 66)	Pierce Lively	No
Bernard J. Leddy	L.B. Johnson	D. Vt.	March 18, 1910	August 25, 1966	January 9, 1972 (aged 61)	Albert Wheeler Coffrin	D → R
Robert Shaw	Kennedy	D.N.J.	May 22, 1907	April 11, 1962	July 9, 1972 (aged 65)	Vincent P. Biunno	D → R
Alexander J. Napoli	L.B. Johnson	N.D. Ill.	October 7, 1905	September 20, 1966	July 12, 1972 (aged 66)	Prentice Marshall	D → R
Edward Cochrane McLean	Kennedy	S.D.N.Y.	October 16, 1903	July 13, 1962	October 12, 1972 (aged 68)	Richard Owen	D → R
James Rosen	Nixon	3d Cir.	October 23, 1909	September 21, 1971	November 18, 1972 (aged 63)	Leonard I. Garth	No
Richard A. Dier	Nixon	D. Neb.	February 27, 1914	December 6, 1971	December 7, 1972 (aged 58)	Albert Gerard Schatz	No
William McRae	Kennedy	M.D. Fla.	September 25, 1909	March 3, 1961	January 27, 1973 (aged 63)	John A. Reed Jr.	D → R
Thomas J. Michie	Kennedy	W.D. Va.	June 7, 1896	June 27, 1961	April 9, 1973 (aged 76)	Seat abolished	n/a
George Rosling	Kennedy	E.D.N.Y.	December 22, 1900	March 16, 1962	April 16, 1973 (aged 72)	Thomas Collier Platt Jr.	D → R
W. Wallace Kent	Nixon	6th Cir.	May 1, 1916	December 16, 1970	May 28, 1973 (aged 57)	Albert J. Engel Jr.	No
Orville Edwin Langley	L.B. Johnson	E.D. Okla.	October 28, 1908	January 26, 1965	September 12, 1973 (aged 64)	Joseph Wilson Morris	D → R
John Joseph Kitchen	Nixon	D.N.J.	December 29, 1911	October 13, 1970	September 21, 1973 (aged 61)	Henry Curtis Meanor	No
Sidney Lee Christie	L.B. Johnson	N.D. W.Va. S.D. W.Va.	April 17, 1903	April 30, 1964	February 15, 1974 (aged 70)	Charles Harold Haden II	D → R
Philip Neville	L.B. Johnson	D. Minn.	November 5, 1909	July 31, 1967	February 13, 1974 (aged 64)	Donald Alsop	D → R
John Oliver Henderson	Eisenhower	W.D.N.Y.	November 13, 1909	September 14, 1959	February 19, 1974 (aged 64)	John T. Elfvin	No
Ernest Allen Guinn	L.B. Johnson	W.D. Tex.	September 29, 1905	July 22, 1966	June 9, 1974 (aged 68)	William S. Sessions	D → R
Stephen John Roth	Kennedy	E.D. Mich.	April 21, 1908	May 1, 1962	July 11, 1974 (aged 66)	James Paul Churchill	D → R
George N. Beamer	Kennedy	N.D. Ind.	October 9, 1904	April 11, 1962	October 21, 1974 (aged 70)	Phil McClellan McNagny Jr.	D → R
Mac Swinford	F.D. Roosevelt	E.D. Ky. W.D. Ky.	December 23, 1899	August 20, 1937	February 3, 1975 (aged 75)	Eugene Edward Siler Jr.	D → R
Herbert William Christenberry	Truman	E.D. La.	December 11, 1897	December 18, 1947	October 5, 1975 (aged 77)	Charles Schwartz Jr.	D → R
William Nelson Goodwin	L.B. Johnson	E.D. Wash. W.D. Wash.	August 17, 1909	April 21, 1966	December 31, 1975 (aged 66)	Jack Edward Tanner	No
Richard Wellington McLaren	Nixon	N.D. Ill.	April 21, 1918	December 2, 1971	February 25, 1976 (aged 57)	Stanley Julian Roszkowski	R → D
William Ernest Miller	Nixon	6th Cir.	February 3, 1908	June 26, 1970	April 12, 1976 (aged 68)	Gilbert S. Merritt Jr.	R → D
Orrin Grimmell Judd	L.B. Johnson	E.D.N.Y.	September 6, 1906	June 24, 1968	July 7, 1976 (aged 69)	Eugene Nickerson	No
William Joseph Lynch	L.B. Johnson	N.D. Ill.	June 6, 1908	March 4, 1966	August 9, 1976 (aged 68)	Nicholas John Bua	No
Michael Henry Sheridan	Kennedy	M.D. Penn.	July 8, 1912	August 30, 1961	August 23, 1976 (aged 64)	Seat abolished	n/a
James Braxton Craven Jr.	L.B. Johnson	4th Cir.	April 3, 1918	June 29, 1966	May 3, 1977 (aged 59)	James Dickson Phillips Jr.	No
Clifton Rhodes Bratcher	Nixon	W.D. Ky.	December 23, 1917	October 13, 1970	July 25, 1977 (aged 59)	Thomas A. Ballantine Jr.	R → D
James Henry Gorbey	Nixon	E.D. Pa.	July 30, 1920	December 19, 1970	October 24, 1977 (aged 57)	Norma Levy Shapiro	R → D
Roger Blake West	Nixon	E.D. La.	May 10, 1928	June 18, 1971	January 24, 1978 (aged 49)	Adrian G. Duplantier	R → D
Willis William Ritter	Truman	D. Utah	January 24, 1899	June 29, 1950	March 4, 1978 (aged 79)	Bruce Sterling Jenkins	No
Lawrence Gubow	L.B. Johnson	E.D. Mich.	January 10, 1919	September 13, 1968	March 26, 1978 (aged 59)	Julian A. Cook	No
Terry Shell	Ford	E.D. Ark. W.D. Ark.	April 2, 1922	September 15, 1975	June 25, 1978 (aged 56)	Richard S. Arnold	R → D
Joseph Cornelius Waddy	L.B. Johnson	D.D.C.	May 26, 1911	March 2, 1967	August 1, 1978 (aged 67)	John Garrett Penn	No
Dick Yin Wong	Ford	D. Haw.	September 13, 1920	April 24, 1975	December 26, 1978 (aged 58)	Walter Heen (recess); Harold Fong	No (Note: Democratic President Jimmy Carter's recess appointment was not confirmed by the senate, and the seat was filled on a permanent basis by an appointee of Republican Ronald Reagan.)
William C. Frey	Nixon	D. Ariz.	July 24, 1919	November 25, 1970	February 16, 1979 (aged 59)	Richard Bilby	R → D
Allen E. Barrow	Kennedy	N.D. Okla.	January 22, 1914	August 1, 1962	February 26, 1979 (aged 65)	James O. Ellison	No
George H. Barlow	Nixon	D.N.J.	January 4, 1921	December 17, 1969	March 4, 1979 (aged 58)	Harold A. Ackerman	R → D
John H. Wood Jr.	Nixon	W.D. Tex.	March 31, 1916	November 25, 1970	May 29, 1979 (aged 63)	Lucius Desha Bunton III	R → D
Donald Edward Lane	Nixon	CCPA	June 10, 1909	June 19, 1969	May 30, 1979 (aged 69)	Helen W. Nies	R → D
Marshall Allen Neill	Nixon	E.D. Wash.	August 23, 1914	August 2, 1972	October 6, 1979 (aged 65)	Justin L. Quackenbush	R → D
Harold Leventhal	L.B. Johnson	D.C. Cir.	January 5, 1915	April 7, 1965	November 20, 1979 (aged 64)	Ruth Bader Ginsburg	No
Murray Gurfein	Nixon	2d Cir.	November 17, 1907	August 22, 1974	December 16, 1979 (aged 72)	Lawrence W. Pierce	R → D
José Victor Toledo	Nixon	D.P.R.	August 14, 1931	November 25, 1970	February 3, 1980 (aged 48)	Raymond L. Acosta	R → D
Charles Stanley Blair	Nixon	D. Md.	December 20, 1927	July 29, 1971	April 20, 1980 (aged 52)	Norman Park Ramsey	R → D
Daniel John Snyder Jr.	Nixon	W.D. Pa.	May 2, 1916	April 10, 1973	May 11, 1980 (aged 64)	Glenn E. Mencer	No
Morell Edward Sharp	Nixon	W.D. Wash.	September 12, 1920	December 2, 1971	October 19, 1980 (aged 60)	John C. Coughenour	No
Phil McClellan McNagny Jr.	Ford	N.D. Ind.	July 16, 1924	May 6, 1976	March 28, 1981 (aged 56)	Michael Stephen Kanne	No
William W. Knox	Nixon	W.D. Pa.	June 18, 1911	October 8, 1970	August 30, 1981 (aged 70)	Carol Los Mansmann	No
Robert A. Ainsworth Jr.	L.B. Johnson	5th Cir.	May 10, 1910	July 22, 1966	December 22, 1981 (aged 71)	W. Eugene Davis	D → R
Robert Lowe Kunzig	Nixon	Ct. Cl.	October 31, 1918	December 2, 1971	February 21, 1982 (aged 63)	Jean Galloway Bissell (Note: As a judge of the United States Court of Appeals for the Federal Circuit.)	No
Jack Murphy Gordon	Nixon	E.D. La.	February 13, 1931	June 18, 1971	March 4, 1982 (aged 51)	Martin Leach-Cross Feldman	No
Scovel Richardson	Eisenhower	USCIT	February 4, 1912	April 4, 1957	March 30, 1982 (aged 70)	Gregory W. Carman	No
Robert Arthur Sprecher	Nixon	7th Cir.	May 30, 1917	April 21, 1971	May 15, 1982 (aged 64)	Joel Flaum	No
Hernan Gregorio Pesquera	Nixon	D.P.R.	May 25, 1924	October 12, 1972	September 8, 1982 (aged 58)	Hector Manuel Laffitte	No
Frank Wiley Wilson	Kennedy	E.D. Tenn.	June 21, 1917	June 14, 1961	September 29, 1982 (aged 65)	Thomas Gray Hull	D → R
Cale James Holder	Eisenhower	S.D. Ind.	April 5, 1912	August 6, 1954	August 23, 1983 (aged 71)	Sarah Evans Barker	No
Mary Anne Richey	Ford	D. Ariz.	October 24, 1917	June 16, 1976	November 25, 1983 (aged 66)	William Docker Browning	No
Henry Frederick Werker	Nixon	S.D.N.Y.	April 16, 1920	June 21, 1974	May 10, 1984 (aged 64)	Louis L. Stanton	No
J. Waldo Ackerman	Ford	C.D. Ill.	January 1, 1926	July 2, 1976	November 23, 1984 (aged 58)	Harold Baker	No
Albert Gerard Schatz	Nixon	D. Neb.	August 4, 1921	May 10, 1973	April 30, 1985 (aged 63)	Lyle Elmer Strom	No
George Edward Cire	Carter	S.D. Tex.	September 29, 1922	May 10, 1979	May 5, 1985 (aged 62)	David Hittner	D → R
Edward Allen Tamm	L.B. Johnson	D.C. Cir.	April 21, 1906	March 11, 1965	September 22, 1985 (aged 79)	James L. Buckley	D → R
David Dortch Warriner	Nixon	E.D. Va.	February 25, 1929	May 16, 1974	March 17, 1986 (aged 57)	Rebecca Beach Smith	No
Albert Tate Jr.	Carter	5th Cir.	September 23, 1920	October 4, 1979	March 27, 1986 (aged 65)	John M. Duhé Jr.	D → R
Alfred Leopold Luongo	Kennedy	E.D. Pa.	August 17, 1920	September 21, 1961	July 19, 1986 (aged 65)	Franklin Van Antwerpen	D → R
Ross Thompson Roberts	Reagan	W.D. Mo.	November 28, 1938	August 20, 1982	April 24, 1987 (aged 48)	Dean Whipple	No
William Overton	Carter	E.D. Ark.	September 19, 1939	May 10, 1979	July 14, 1987 (aged 47)	Stephen M. Reasoner	D → R
Robert Madden Hill	Reagan	5th Cir.	January 13, 1928	June 15, 1984	October 19, 1987 (aged 59)	Jacques L. Wiener Jr.	No
Ross N. Sterling	Ford	S.D. Tex.	January 18, 1931	May 6, 1976	January 14, 1988 (aged 56)	Sim Lake	No
Edward Weinfeld	Truman	S.D.N.Y.	May 14, 1901	August 1, 1950	January 17, 1988 (aged 86)	John S. Martin Jr.	D → R
Lloyd Hudson Burke	Eisenhower	N.D. Cal.	April 1, 1916	July 21, 1958	March 15, 1988 (aged 71)	Seat abolished	n/a
J. Blaine Anderson	Ford	9th Cir.	January 19, 1922	July 2, 1976	April 16, 1988 (aged 66)	Thomas G. Nelson	No
Richard J. Daronco	Reagan	S.D.N.Y.	August 1, 1931	May 7, 1987	May 21, 1988 (aged 56)	Louis Freeh	No
Valdemar Aguirre Cordova	Carter	D. Ariz.	December 6, 1922	June 19, 1979	June 18, 1988 (aged 65)	Seat abolished	n/a
Oscar Hirsh Davis	Kennedy	Fed. Cir.	February 27, 1914	April 11, 1962	June 19, 1988 (aged 74)	Raymond C. Clevenger	D → R
Paul Peter Rao	Truman	USCIT	June 15, 1899	January 31, 1949	November 30, 1988 (aged 89)	Richard W. Goldberg	D → R
Philip Pratt	Nixon	E.D. Mich.	July 14, 1924	November 25, 1970	February 7, 1989 (aged 64)	Gerald Ellis Rosen	No
Robert Smith Vance	Carter	11th Cir.	May 10, 1931	December 15, 1977	December 16, 1989 (aged 58)	Joel Fredrick Dubina	D → R
George C. Carr	Carter	M.D. Fla.	July 26, 1929	December 15, 1977	January 26, 1990 (aged 60)	Anne C. Conway	D → R
Jean Galloway Bissell	Reagan	Fed. Cir.	June 9, 1936	June 8, 1984	February 4, 1990 (aged 53)	Randall Ray Rader	No
Eugene P. Spellman	Carter	S.D. Fla.	September 16, 1930	October 4, 1979	May 4, 1991 (aged 60)	K. Michael Moore	D → R
George Arceneaux	Carter	E.D. La.	May 17, 1928	September 25, 1979	April 6, 1993 (aged 64)	Stanwood Duval	No
George Hughes Revercomb	Reagan	D.D.C.	June 3, 1929	December 16, 1985	August 1, 1993 (aged 64)	James Robertson	R → D
John P. Vukasin Jr.	Reagan	N.D. Cal.	May 25, 1928	September 20, 1983	September 20, 1993 (aged 65)	Maxine M. Chesney	R → D
Sam B. Hall Jr.	Reagan	E.D. Tex.	January 11, 1924	May 3, 1985	April 10, 1994 (aged 70)	David Folsom	R → D
Ronald Edward Meredith	Reagan	W.D. Ky.	January 30, 1946	April 3, 1985	December 1, 1994 (aged 48)	Joseph H. McKinley Jr.	R → D
Veronica DiCarlo Wicker	Carter	E.D. La.	November 26, 1930	September 25, 1979	December 10, 1994 (aged 64)	Ivan L. R. Lemelle	No
Harold Fong	Reagan	D. Haw.	April 28, 1938	June 18, 1982	April 20, 1995 (aged 56)	Susan Oki Mollway	R → D
Carl Bernard Rubin	Nixon	S.D. Ohio	March 27, 1920	May 20, 1971	August 2, 1995 (aged 75)	Edmund A. Sargus Jr.	R → D
William D. Hutchinson	Reagan	3d Cir.	June 20, 1932	August 5, 1987	October 8, 1995 (aged 63)	Marjorie Rendell	R → D
Okla Jones II	Clinton	E.D. La.	September 23, 1945	October 7, 1994	January 8, 1996 (aged 50)	Carl Barbier	No
T. F. Gilroy Daly	Carter	D. Conn.	February 25, 1931	August 5, 1977	July 11, 1996 (aged 65)	Janet C. Hall	No
J. Daniel Mahoney	Reagan	2d Cir.	September 7, 1931	March 27, 1986	October 23, 1996 (aged 65)	Sonia Sotomayor	R → D
Donald S. Russell	Nixon	4th Cir.	February 22, 1906	April 21, 1971	February 22, 1998 (aged 92)	William Byrd Traxler Jr.	R → D
John David Kelly	Clinton	8th Cir.	October 9, 1934	July 31, 1998	October 21, 1998 (aged 64)	Kermit Edward Bye	No
Linda Hodge McLaughlin	G.H.W. Bush	C.D. Cal.	February 13, 1942	August 12, 1992	March 7, 1999 (aged 57)	Florence-Marie Cooper	R → D
Walter J. Cummings Jr.	L.B. Johnson	7th Cir.	September 29, 1916	August 10, 1966	April 24, 1999 (aged 82)	Ann Claire Williams	No
Giles Rich	Eisenhower	Fed. Cir.	May 30, 1904	July 19, 1956	June 9, 1999 (aged 95)	Richard Linn	R → D
Robert S. Gawthrop III	Reagan	E.D. Pa.	December 2, 1942	December 8, 1987	August 1, 1999 (aged 56)	Berle M. Schiller	R → D
Samuel James Ervin III	Carter	4th Cir.	March 2, 1926	May 21, 1980	September 18, 1999 (aged 73)	Allyson K. Duncan	D → R
D. Brook Bartlett	Reagan	W.D. Mo.	February 22, 1937	September 16, 1981	January 21, 2000 (aged 62)	Richard Everett Dorr	No
Jerome Turner	Reagan	W.D. Tenn.	February 18, 1942	December 8, 1987	February 12, 2000 (aged 57)	Samuel H. Mays Jr.	No
Morton A. Brody	G.H.W. Bush	D. Me.	June 12, 1933	July 18, 1991	March 25, 2000 (aged 66)	George Z. Singal	R → D
Francis Dominic Murnaghan Jr.	Carter	4th Cir.	June 20, 1920	July 12, 1979	August 31, 2000 (aged 80)	Andre M. Davis	No
Paul E. Riley	Clinton	S.D. Ill.	April 24, 1942	October 6, 1994	October 11, 2001 (aged 59)	Seat abolished	n/a
Hipolito Frank Garcia	Carter	W.D. Tex.	December 4, 1925	September 29, 1980	January 16, 2002 (aged 76)	Robert A. Junell	D → R
Carol Los Mansmann	Reagan	3d Cir.	August 7, 1942	April 3, 1985	March 9, 2002 (aged 59)	D. Brooks Smith	No
Allen G. Schwartz	Clinton	S.D.N.Y.	August 23, 1934	November 20, 1993	March 22, 2003 (aged 68)	Kenneth M. Karas	D → R
Edwin L. Nelson	G.H.W. Bush	N.D. Ala.	February 10, 1940	January 23, 1990	May 17, 2003 (aged 63)	Virginia Emerson Hopkins	No
Jay Waldman	Reagan	E.D. Pa.	November 16, 1944	October 14, 1988	May 30, 2003 (aged 58)	Juan Ramon Sánchez	No
Wilkie D. Ferguson	Clinton	S.D. Fla.	May 11, 1938	November 20, 1993	June 9, 2003 (aged 65)	Marcia G. Cooke	D → R
Fred I. Parker	Clinton	2d Cir.	February 2, 1938	October 7, 1994	August 12, 2003 (aged 65)	Peter W. Hall	D → R
Ralph Wilson Nimmons Jr.	G.H.W. Bush	M.D. Fla.	September 14, 1938	June 27, 1991	November 24, 2003 (aged 65)	Virginia M. Hernandez Covington	No
John H. Hannah Jr.	Clinton	E.D. Tex.	June 30, 1939	March 10, 1994	December 4, 2003 (aged 64)	Michael H. Schneider Sr.	D → R
Charles Harold Haden II	Ford	S.D. W.Va.	April 16, 1937	November 20, 1975	March 20, 2004 (aged 66)	Thomas E. Johnston	No
Judith Keep	Carter	S.D. Cal.	March 24, 1944	June 26, 1980	September 14, 2004 (aged 60)	Janis Lynn Sammartino	D → R
Harold Brent McKnight	G.W. Bush	W.D.N.C.	February 20, 1952	July 31, 2003	November 27, 2004 (aged 52)	Frank DeArmon Whitney	No
William Rehnquist	Reagan	SCOTUS	October 1, 1924	September 17, 1986	September 3, 2005 (aged 80)	John Roberts	No
Susan Bieke Neilson	G.W. Bush	6th Cir.	August 27, 1956	October 27, 2005	January 25, 2006 (aged 49)	Helene White	No
W. Craig Broadwater	Clinton	N.D. W.Va.	August 8, 1950	July 12, 1996	December 18, 2006 (aged 56)	Gina M. Groh	D → R
Richard C. Casey	Clinton	S.D.N.Y.	January 19, 1933	October 21, 1997	March 22, 2007 (aged 74)	Cathy Seibel	D → R
George Howard Jr.	Carter	E.D. Ark.	May 13, 1924	September 29, 1980	April 21, 2007 (aged 82)	Brian S. Miller	D → R
Phillip S. Figa	G.W. Bush	D. Colo.	July 27, 1951	October 2, 2003	January 5, 2008 (aged 56)	R. Brooke Jackson	No
Reginald C. Lindsay	Clinton	D. Mass.	March 19, 1945	November 20, 1993	March 12, 2009 (aged 63)	Denise J. Casper	No
Florence-Marie Cooper	Clinton	C.D. Cal.	February 9, 1940	November 10, 1999	January 15, 2010 (aged 69)	John Kronstadt	No
Thomas M. Golden	G.W. Bush	E.D. Pa.	November 1, 1947	May 4, 2006	July 31, 2010 (aged 62)	Jeffrey L. Schmehl	R → D
John Roll	G.H.W. Bush	D. Ariz.	February 8, 1947	November 22, 1991	January 8, 2011 (aged 63)	Jennifer Zipps	R → D
M. Blane Michael	Clinton	4th Cir.	February 17, 1943	September 30, 1993	March 25, 2011 (aged 68)	Stephanie Thacker	No
Ralph E. Tyson	Clinton	M.D. La.	August 13, 1948	July 31, 1998	July 18, 2011 (aged 62)	Shelly Dick	No
Pamela Ann Rymer	G.H.W. Bush	9th Cir.	January 6, 1941	May 18, 1989	September 21, 2011 (aged 70)	Paul J. Watford	R → D
W. Allen Pepper Jr.	Clinton	N.D. Miss.	July 20, 1941	June 30, 1999	January 24, 2012 (aged 70)	Debra M. Brown	No
William J. Hibbler	Clinton	N.D. Ill.	August 7, 1946	April 15, 1999	March 19, 2012 (aged 65)	Andrea Wood	No
Mark R. Kravitz	G.W. Bush	D. Conn.	June 21, 1950	June 11, 2003	September 30, 2012 (aged 62)	Jeffrey A. Meyer	R → D
Richard Everett Dorr	G.W. Bush	W.D. Mo.	August 26, 1943	August 1, 2002	April 24, 2013 (aged 69)	M. Douglas Harpool	R → D
Gary L. Lancaster	Clinton	W.D. Pa.	August 14, 1949	November 20, 1993	April 24, 2013 (aged 63)	Marilyn Horan	D → R
Antonin Scalia	Reagan	SCOTUS	March 11, 1936	September 17, 1986	February 13, 2016 (aged 79)	Neil Gorsuch	No
Beverly Reid O'Connell	Obama	C.D. Cal.	May 12, 1965	April 15, 2013	October 8, 2017 (aged 52)	Kenly Kiya Kato	No
Stephen Reinhardt	Carter	9th Cir.	March 27, 1931	September 11, 1980	March 29, 2018 (aged 87)	Kenneth K. Lee	D → R
Pamela L. Reeves	Obama	E.D. Tenn.	July 21, 1954	March 5, 2014	September 10, 2020 (aged 66)	Katherine A. Crytzer	D → R
Ruth Bader Ginsburg	Clinton	SCOTUS	March 15, 1933	August 3, 1993	September 18, 2020 (aged 87)	Amy Coney Barrett	D → R
Juan R. Torruella	Reagan	1st Cir.	June 7, 1933	October 4, 1984	October 26, 2020 (aged 87)	Gustavo Gelpí	R → D
Philip Ray Martinez	G.W. Bush	W.D. Tex.	July 13, 1957	February 5, 2002	February 26, 2021 (aged 63)	Ernesto Gonzalez	R → D
Martin Leach-Cross Feldman	Reagan	E.D. La.	January 28, 1934	October 4, 1983	January 26, 2022 (aged 87)	Brandon Scott Long	R → D
Michael Stephen Kanne	Reagan	7th Cir.	December 21, 1938	May 19, 1987	June 16, 2022 (aged 83)	Joshua P. Kolar	R → D
Edward G. Smith	Obama	E.D. Pa.	September 17, 1961	March 26, 2014	November 27, 2023 (aged 62)	Catherine Henry	No
Gene E. K. Pratter	G.W. Bush	E.D. Pa.	February 25, 1949	June 15, 2004	May 17, 2024 (aged 75)	Gail A. Weilheimer	R → D
Jeffrey A. Meyer	Obama	D. Conn.	April 13, 1963	February 24, 2014	January 12, 2025 (aged 61)		

== See also ==
- List of United States federal judges killed in office
- List of United States federal judges by longevity of service
- List of members of the United States Congress who died in office
- List of presidents of the United States who died in office
