= List of United States federal judges killed in office =

The following is a list of United States federal judges who were killed in office.

== Assassinations ==
=== John P. Slough ===
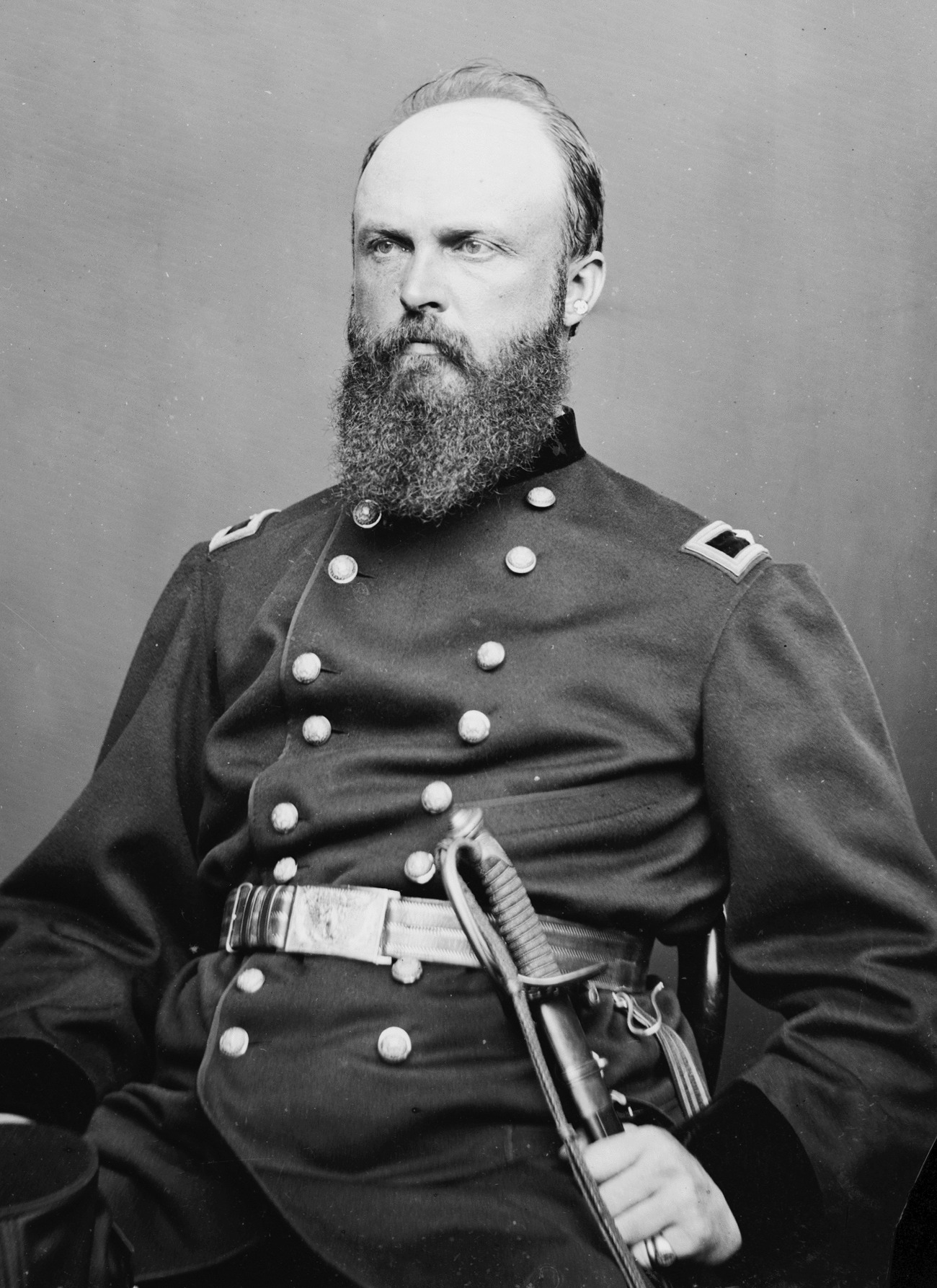
John P. Slough

John P. Slough was appointed by President Andrew Johnson to serve as chief justice of the New Mexico Territorial Supreme Court. In 1867, William Logan Rynerson, a member of the Territorial Legislative Council, took part in a campaign to denigrate the judge, and authored a resolution in the legislature to have the judge removed, leading Slough to slander Rynerson publicly. On December 15, 1867, Rynerson drew a gun on the judge in Santa Fe, New Mexico, and said, "Take it back". Slough exclaimed, "Shoot and be damned!" and Rynerson fired. Mortally wounded, Slough drew a derringer but was unable to fire. He died two days later.

At his trial, Rynerson was found not guilty (by reason of self-defense), an example of the growing power of what became known as the Republican controlled Santa Fe Ring. Outcries for a nonpartisan investigation were ignored over the protests of friends in New Mexico, Denver, and Cincinnati. Historian Richard Henry Brown says that the murder of Slough "helped affirm the position of New Mexico as 'apparently the only place where assassination became an integral part of the political system.'"

=== John H. Wood Jr. ===
John H. Wood Jr. was appointed by President Richard Nixon to the United States District Court for the Western District of Texas. He was assassinated on May 29, 1979, by Charles Harrelson in the parking lot outside Wood's home in San Antonio, Texas. Harrelson was convicted of killing Wood, having been hired to do so by drug dealer Jamiel Chagra of El Paso, Texas. Wood — nicknamed "Maximum John" because of his reputation for handing down long sentences for drug offenses — was originally scheduled to have Chagra appear before him on the day of his murder, but the trial had been delayed.

=== Richard J. Daronco ===
Richard J. Daronco was appointed by President Ronald Reagan to the United States District Court for the Southern District of New York. In April 1988, Daronco presided over a bench trial in a sex discrimination and sexual harassment case, in which the plaintiff represented herself. On May 19, 1988, Daronco issued a written decision holding in the defendant employer's favor and dismissing the case. On May 21, 1988, Charles L. Koster, a retired New York City police officer and the father of the unsuccessful plaintiff, shot and killed Daronco while the judge was doing yardwork at his home in Pelham, New York. Koster then committed suicide.

=== Robert Smith Vance ===
Robert Smith Vance was appointed by President Jimmy Carter to the United States Court of Appeals for the Fifth Circuit. Vance was killed at his home in Mountain Brook, Alabama on December 16, 1989, when he opened a package containing a mail bomb. Vance was killed instantly and his wife, Helen, was seriously injured. After an intensive investigation, the federal government charged Walter Leroy Moody Jr. with the murders of Vance and of Robert E. Robinson, a black civil rights attorney in Savannah, Georgia, who had been killed in a separate explosion. Moody was eventually convicted of the murder in both federal court and in Alabama state court, and was subsequently sentenced to death. Prosecutors speculated that Moody's motive for killing Vance was anger over the fact that the appeals court on which Vance sat had refused to expunge a prior conviction of Moody's, though Vance had not been directly involved in that decision. Moody was executed by lethal injection on April 19, 2018, in Alabama.

=== John Roll ===
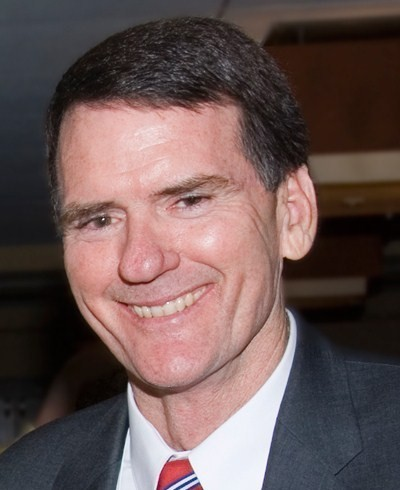
John Roll

John Roll was appointed by President George H. W. Bush to the United States District Court for the District of Arizona. Roll was fatally shot in the 2011 Tucson shooting, which occurred on January 8, 2011, outside a Safeway supermarket in Casas Adobes, Arizona, when a gunman opened fire at a "Congress on Your Corner" event held by Democratic U.S. House Representative Gabby Giffords; Roll later succumbed to his injuries, as did five other people. Fourteen others were wounded including Giffords. Roll had attended Mass earlier that morning and had decided to attend the event about an hour before the shooting.

Roll lived in the area, and a Giffords staff member suggested that Roll "had simply gone to the Safeway where the shooting occurred to shop." Jared Lee Loughner was taken into custody, charged by federal prosecutors with Roll's murder, and pleaded guilty. Evidence gathered by federal investigators indicates that Giffords was the main target, and that Loughner may not have known he was shooting a federal judge.

=== Sandra J. Feuerstein ===
Sandra J. Feuerstein was appointed by President George W. Bush to a seat on the United States District Court for the Eastern District of New York, and assumed senior status on January 21, 2015. Feuerstein died on April 9, 2021, after being struck by a car driven by Nastasia Snape in a hit and run incident in Boca Raton, Florida. The driver also hit and injured a small child, and then drove five more miles before crashing. Police reported that when she was apprehended, Snape claimed to be Harry Potter, and that drug paraphernalia was found in the vehicle.

== Attempted killings ==
=== Tillman D. Johnson ===
In 1927, Tillman D. Johnson of the United States District Court for the District of Utah was shot three times while mounting the bench in Salt Lake City, Utah. The assailant, Eliza Simmons was angry at Johnson for ruling against her in a case decided in 1924 involving the death of her husband in a 1910 mining accident. Johnson was not seriously injured, only suffering flesh wounds to his lower body. Convicted of attempted murder in November 1927, Simmons was sentenced to seven years in prison.

=== Joan Lefkow ===
In 2005, an assailant broke into the Chicago home of Judge Joan Lefkow of the United States District Court for the Northern District of Illinois and murdered the judge's husband and mother there. The suspect committed suicide, leaving a suicide note containing a confession and stating that he had planned to murder the judge.

=== Esther Salas ===
In 2020, a man disguised as a FedEx delivery driver gained entry to the North Brunswick, New Jersey home of Judge Esther Salas of the United States District Court for the District of New Jersey and murdered the judge's son, also critically injuring the judge's husband. The suspect was 72-year-old Roy Den Hollander, a self-proclaimed "anti-feminist" lawyer who had appeared before Salas and was dissatisfied with the disposition of his case. Hollander was discovered dead the next day of a self-inflicted gunshot wound. The FBI matched Hollander's gun to the murder of a rival lawyer who represented a men's rights group in California, and police found a list of other potential targets, including three more female judges.

== Unsolved deaths ==
=== William Lynn Parkinson ===
William Lynn Parkinson was appointed by Dwight D. Eisenhower as a judge for the United States Court of Appeals for the Seventh Circuit. Parkinson disappeared in 1959, and his body was found floating in Lake Michigan six months later. The cause of death was determined to be drowning, but the circumstances were never resolved. A later inquest indicated his death was under mysterious circumstances and did not rule out either natural death or foul play.

== See also ==
- Deaths of United States federal judges in active service
- List of assassinated American politicians
- List of members of the United States Congress killed or wounded in office
- List of members of the United States Congress who died in office
- List of United States presidential assassination attempts and plots
