= List of members of the United States Congress who died in office =

There are several lists of members of the United States Congress who died in office. These include:

- List of members of the United States Congress who died in office (1790–1899)
- List of members of the United States Congress who died in office (1900–1949)
- List of members of the United States Congress who died in office (1950–1999)
- List of members of the United States Congress who died in office (2000–present)

== See also ==
- Deaths of United States federal judges in active service
- List of presidents of the United States who died in office
