= List of federal judges appointed by James A. Garfield =

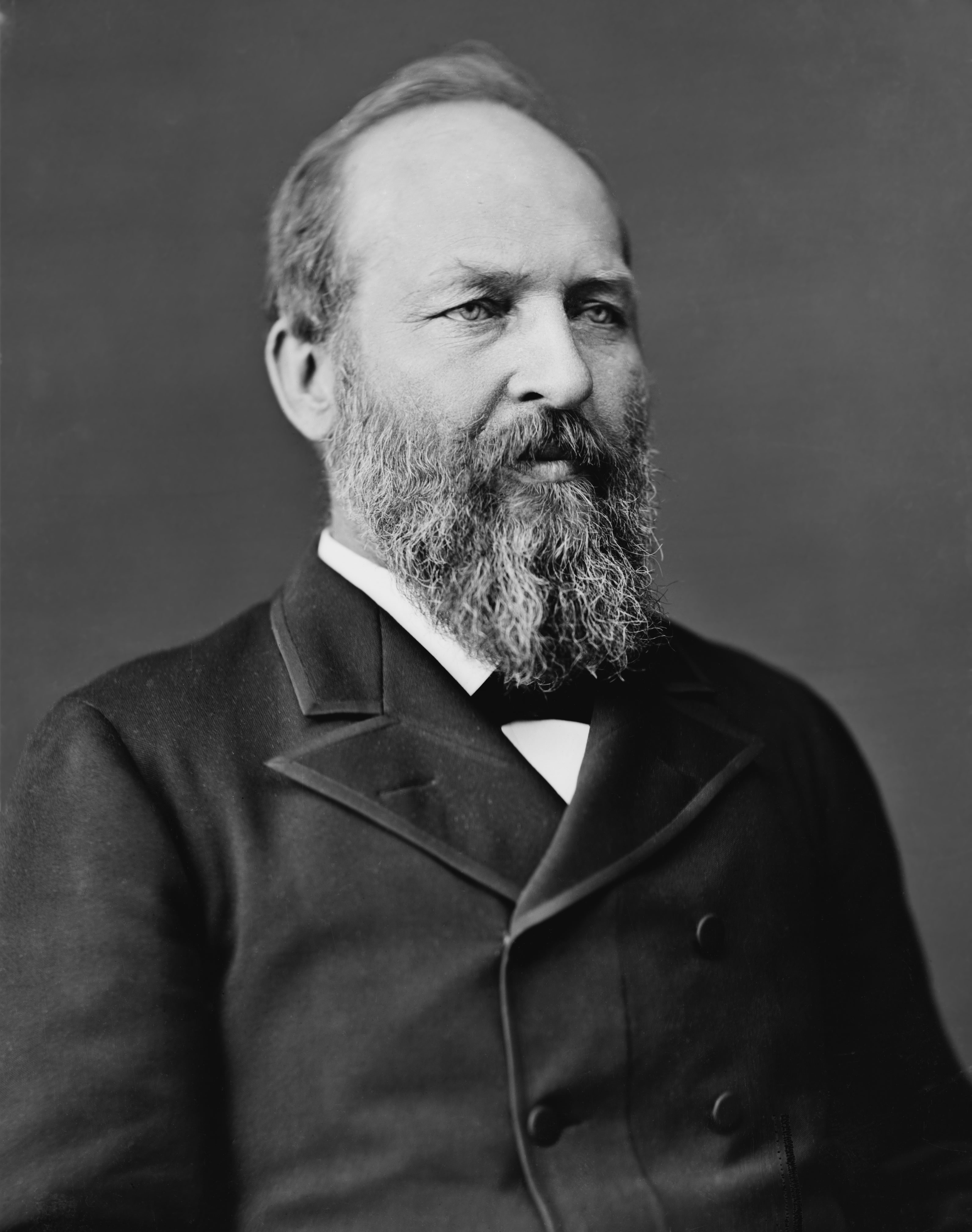
Brady-Handy photograph of Garfield, taken between 1870 and 1880.

Despite his short tenure in office, James A. Garfield appointed 5 Article III United States federal judges including 1 Justice to the Supreme Court of the United States and 1 judge to the United States circuit courts and 3 judges to the United States district courts. Garfield shared the appointment of Addison Brown with his successor, Chester A. Arthur, with Garfield placing him on the bench via a recess appointment and Arthur later nominating him to the same seat and issuing his commission.

Garfield appointed 1 judge to the United States Court of Claims, an Article I tribunal.

== Supreme Court ==
#	Justice	Seat	State	Former justice	Nomination date	Confirmation date	Began active service	Ended active service
1	Stanley Matthews	6	Ohio	Noah Haynes Swayne	March 14, 1881 (Note: Was previously nominated by President Hayes on January 26, 1881. That nomination expired at the end of the term. Renominated on March 14, 1881 by President Garfield.)	May 12, 1881	May 12, 1881	March 22, 1889

== Circuit courts ==
#	Judge	Circuit	Nomination date	Confirmation date	Began active service	Ended active service
1	Don Albert Pardee	Fifth	March 14, 1881	May 13, 1881	May 13, 1881	September 26, 1919

== District courts ==
#	Judge	Court (Note: See List of United States district and territorial courts)	Nomination date	Confirmation date	Began active service	Ended active service
1	LeBaron Bradford Colt	D.R.I.	March 9, 1881	March 21, 1881	March 21, 1881	July 23, 1884
2	Alexander Boarman	W.D. La.	May 18, 1881	May 18, 1881	May 18, 1881	August 30, 1916
3	Addison Brown	S.D.N.Y.	–	–	June 2, 1881	August 30, 1901

== Specialty courts (Article I) ==
=== United States Court of Claims ===
#	Judge	Nomination date	Confirmation date	Began active service	Ended active service
1	Glenni William Scofield	May 19, 1881	May 20, 1881	May 20, 1881	July 29, 1891

== Notes ==
Renominations
