= List of federal judges appointed by Andrew Jackson =

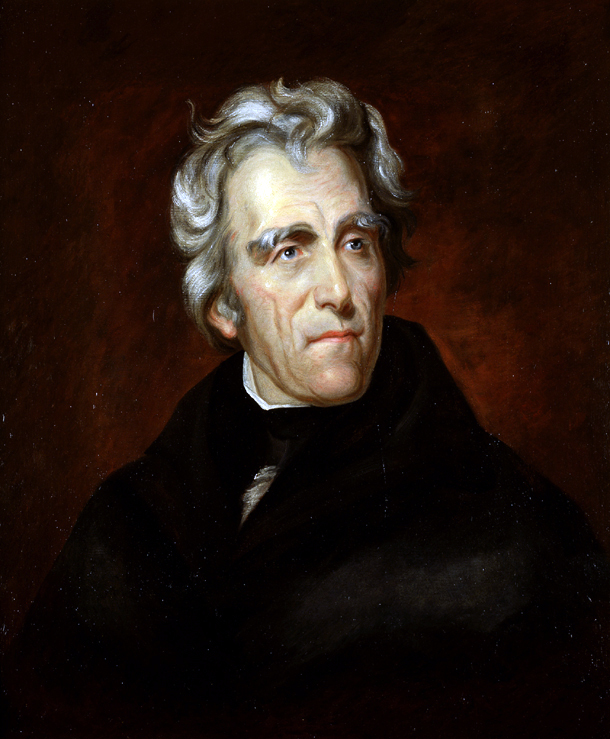
Andrew Jackson

Following is a list of all Article III United States federal judges appointed by President Andrew Jackson during his term of office. In total Jackson appointed 23 Article III federal judges: 5 Justices to the Supreme Court of the United States and 18 judges to the United States district courts.

John Catron was nominated to the United States Supreme Court by President Jackson on the final day of his presidency, March 3, 1837. The United States Senate confirmed the nomination on March 8, 1837, and president Martin Van Buren issued his commission, and thus appointed him, the same day. Jackson also nominated William Smith to the United States Supreme Court on his final day in office. Jackson and Smith had attended the Bullock's Creek Presbyterian school together as children in the Waxhaws. The Senate confirmed Smith on March 8, 1837, but he declined the appointment. Van Buren then appointed Alabama lawyer John McKinley, who had shared land speculation interests with Jackson dating back 20 years.

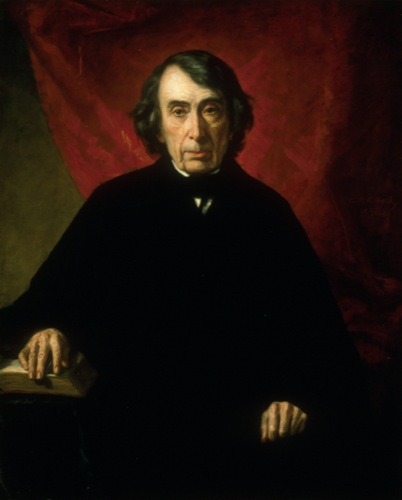
Jackson appointed Roger Brooke Taney as Chief Justice of the United States.

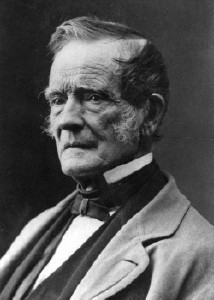
Humphrey H. Leavitt served on the United States District Court for the District of Ohio until 1871.

== United States Supreme Court justices ==
#	Justice	Seat	State	Former justice	Nomination date	Confirmation date	Began active service	Ended active service
1	John McLean	6	Ohio	Robert Trimble	March 6, 1829	March 7, 1829	March 7, 1829	April 4, 1861
2	Henry Baldwin	3	Pennsylvania	Bushrod Washington	January 4, 1830	January 6, 1830	January 6, 1830	April 21, 1844
3	James M. Wayne	5	Georgia	William Johnson	January 6, 1835	January 9, 1835	January 9, 1835	July 5, 1867
4	Philip P. Barbour	4	Virginia	Gabriel Duvall	December 28, 1835	March 15, 1836	March 15, 1836	February 25, 1841
5	Roger B. Taney	Chief	Maryland	John Marshall	December 28, 1835 (Note: Originally nominated on January 15, 1835, to the Associate Justice seat being vacated by Gabriel Duvall. That nomination was not voted on before the end of the session. On December 28, 1835, he was nominated to be Chief Justice.)	March 15, 1836	March 15, 1836	October 12, 1864

== District courts ==
#	Judge	Court (Note: See List of United States district and territorial courts)	Nomination date	Confirmation date	Began active service	Ended active service
1	John Wilson Campbell	D. Ohio	March 6, 1829	March 7, 1829	March 7, 1829	September 24, 1833
2	Samuel Hadden Harper	E.D. La. W.D. La.	March 6, 1829	March 7, 1829	March 7, 1829	July 19, 1837
3	Philip P. Barbour	E.D. Va.	December 14, 1830	December 16, 1830	October 8, 1830	March 17, 1836
4	Matthew Harvey	D.N.H.	December 14, 1830	December 16, 1830	November 2, 1830	April 7, 1866
5	Thomas Irwin	W.D. Pa.	December 7, 1831	March 21, 1832	April 14, 1831	January 4, 1859
6	Powhatan Ellis	D. Miss.	July 13, 1832	July 14, 1832	July 14, 1832	January 5, 1836
7	Benjamin Tappan	D. Ohio	January 20, 1834	–	October 12, 1833	June 30, 1834
8	Morgan Welles Brown	E.D. Tenn. W.D. Tenn.	December 18, 1833	December 31, 1833	January 3, 1834	March 7, 1853
9	Thomas Bell Monroe	D. Ky.	February 20, 1834	March 6, 1834	March 8, 1834	September 18, 1861
10	Humphrey H. Leavitt	D. Ohio	June 28, 1834	June 28, 1834	June 30, 1834	April 1, 1871
11	Jesse Lynch Holman	D. Ind.	March 21, 1836	March 29, 1836	September 16, 1835	March 14, 1842
12	George Adams	D. Miss.	January 12, 1836	January 20, 1836	January 20, 1836	September 30, 1838
13	Upton Scott Heath	D. Md.	April 1, 1836	April 4, 1836	April 4, 1836	February 21, 1852
14	Peter V. Daniel	E.D. Va.	April 6, 1836	April 19, 1836	April 19, 1836	March 3, 1841
15	Robert William Wells	D. Mo.	June 16, 1836	June 27, 1836	June 27, 1836	September 22, 1864
16	Benjamin Johnson	D. Ark.	June 27, 1836	June 29, 1836	June 29, 1836	October 2, 1849
17	Andrew T. Judson	D. Conn.	June 28, 1836	July 4, 1836	July 4, 1836	March 17, 1853
18	Ross Wilkins	D. Mich.	July 2, 1836	July 2, 1836	January 26, 1837	February 18, 1870

== Notes ==
Renominations

== Sources ==
- Federal Judicial Center
