= Richard J. Daronco =

American judge (1931–1988)

Richard Daronco

Judge of the United States District Court for the Southern District of New York
- In office May 7, 1987 – May 21, 1988
- Appointed by: Ronald Reagan
- Preceded by: Lee Parsons Gagliardi
- Succeeded by: Louis Freeh

Personal details
- Born: Richard Joseph Daronco; August 1, 1931 New York City, New York, U.S.
- Died: May 21, 1988 (aged 56) Pelham, New York, U.S.
- Cause of death: Assassination by gunshots
- Spouse: Joan O'Rourke (m. 1957)
- Children: 5
- Education: Providence College (BA); Albany Law School (LLB)

Richard Joseph Daronco (August 1, 1931 – May 21, 1988) was an American lawyer and judge. Born in New York City, he studied at Providence College and Albany Law School before serving for several years in the United States Army. Daronco was first elected a judge of the Westchester County Family Court in 1971. Three years later, he was elected to the Westchester County Court. In 1978, Daronco was appointed by Governor Hugh Carey, and later that year elected, as a justice of the New York State Supreme Court. In 1987, he was appointed by President Ronald Reagan to the United States District Court for the Southern District of New York.

Daronco was on the federal bench for just over a year before he was assassinated at his home in Pelham, New York, by the father of a disgruntled plaintiff whose protracted sexual harassment lawsuit against her former employer had been dismissed by Daronco for lack of evidence. The Westchester County Courthouse and the Pelham Town House were both renamed in his honor.

== Early life and education ==
Richard Joseph Daronco was born on August 1, 1931, in New York City. His father was a tiler who had emigrated from Italy. Daronco attended the New York Military Academy in Cornwall, New York, and Providence College in Rhode Island, where he received a Bachelor of Arts in 1953. He then attended Albany Law School, receiving his Bachelor of Laws in 1956.

Daronco married Joan O'Rourke in 1957, and they had five children together. After graduating from law school, he served in the United States Army as a private, until 1958. Upon the end of his military service, Daronco entered private legal practice as a trial lawyer in New York City. The following year, he moved his practice to White Plains, New York.

== Judicial career ==
=== New York State judiciary ===
In 1971, Daronco was elected a judge of the Westchester County Family Court. Three years later, he was elected to the Westchester County Court. He remained a county judge until 1979, and served for a year as an administrative judge of the county.

Daronco was appointed as an acting justice of the New York State Supreme Court by Governor Hugh Carey in 1978 and elected as a justice of the New York Supreme Court (9th judicial district) on November 8, 1978 (see https://www.nytimes.com/1978/11/09/archives/peyser-cites-moderation-in-victory-over-a-republican-in-westchester.html), where he served until 1987. He became Deputy Chief Administrative Judge of courts outside New York City in 1983, administering the 450 courts outside the city and managing their budget of $185 million (equivalent to $520 million in 2025).

=== Federal judiciary ===
Upon the recommendation of Senator Alfonse D'Amato, Daronco was nominated by President Ronald Reagan on February 2, 1987, to become a judge of the United States District Court for the Southern District of New York, filling the seat vacated by Lee Parsons Gagliardi. He was confirmed by the United States Senate on May 7, 1987, and received his commission the same day. He was officially sworn in by Chief Judge Charles L. Brieant on June 8, 1987, and served until his assassination one year later.

In addition to his judicial offices, Daronco was an adjunct professor at Pace University School of Law and Fordham University School of Law from 1983 to 1988, as well as at Iona College.

== Death ==
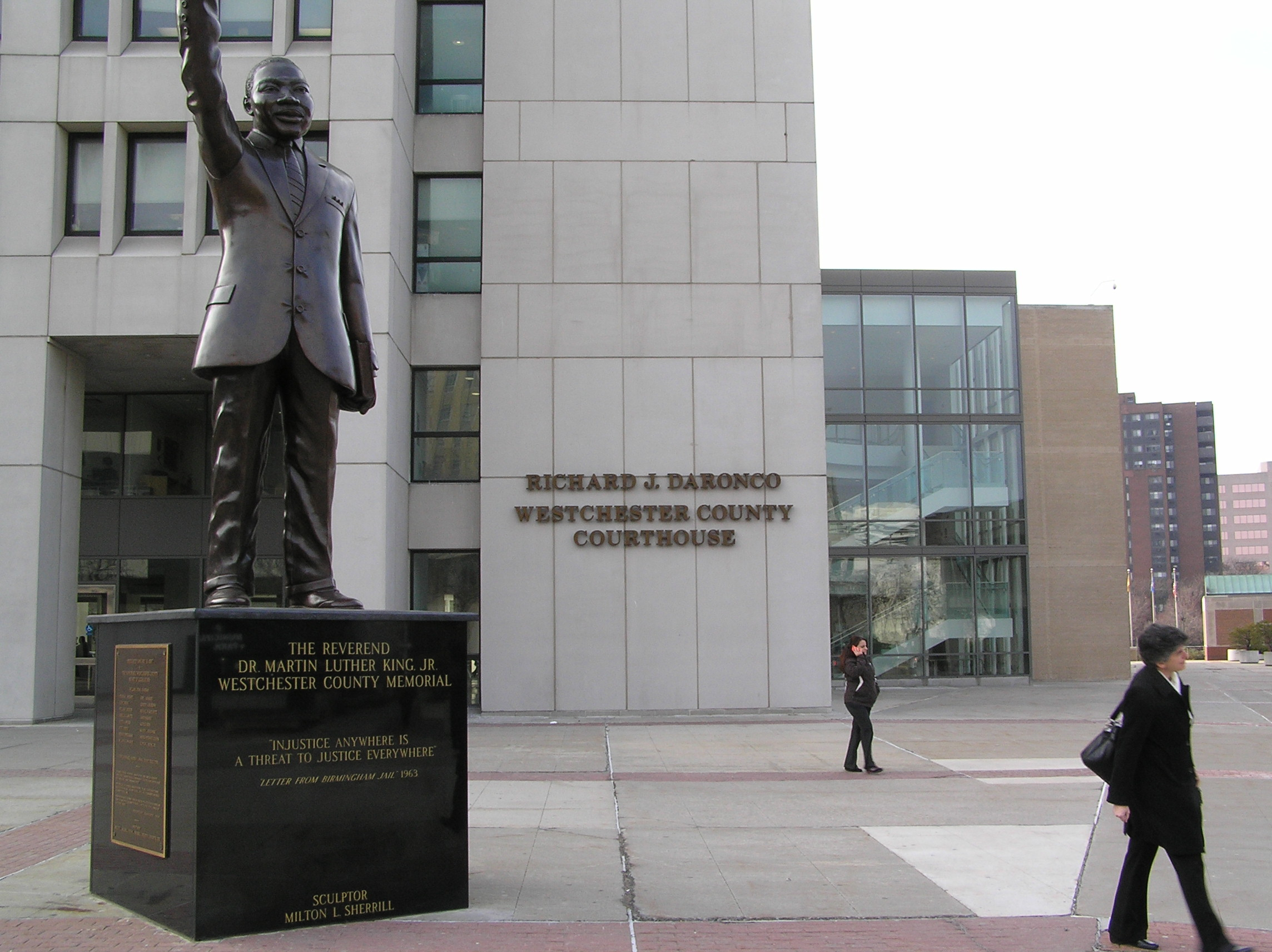
Richard J. Daronco Westchester County Courthouse

=== Preceding trial ===
In April 1988, Daronco became the third judge to preside over a years-long civil lawsuit brought by Carolee Koster against her former employer, Chase Manhattan Bank, for sex discrimination and sexual harassment. Koster alleged that she had been denied promotion and was wrongfully terminated after she ended an affair with a vice president of the bank. She sought $2.5 million (equivalent to $6.81 million in 2025), and had rejected two settlement offers of several hundred thousand dollars. After her third attorney withdrew from the case, Koster represented herself pro se.

During the trial, Koster's father, Charles L. Koster, was asked to leave the courtroom several times for making disruptive noises and expressions. From 1971 to 1981, Charles Koster was a security guard employed by Chase Manhattan Bank. In 1969, he had retired from the New York City Police Department after twenty years as a mounted police officer. Before that, he was enlisted in the United States Army Air Forces and the National Guard.

During the course of the trial, Daronco discussed security measures with courthouse staff, as he expected an adverse reaction from Carolee Koster. However, he did not believe in extensive security precautions, and was described by his colleagues as "a trusting soul." He rarely had the courtroom's security camera and intercom system turned on, and even mentioned during the trial that he lived in Pelham, New York, where he had lived for most of his life. Despite warnings from his staff, Daronco allowed his home address to be published in the telephone book, stating that "if they really want you, they'll find you." He also commuted to the Manhattan courthouse on public transportation. On May 19, 1988, at the conclusion of the 10-day trial, Daronco issued a 39-page decision. He ruled in the defendant's favor and dismissed the case. In his decision, he found that there was not a "scintilla of credible evidence" to support Koster's claims.

=== Shooting ===
On May 20, 1988, Charles Koster drove from his trailer home in Bath, Pennsylvania, to Pelham. He stayed the night at an unknown location. The following afternoon, Koster drove to Daronco's house and parked his car several blocks away, at Holy Sepulchre Cemetery. He walked to Daronco's house, where he found Daronco tending to the garden in his front yard. Moments later, Koster fired four shots at Daronco from a .38 caliber revolver.

Wounded by at least three of the shots, which caused major bleeding, Daronco attempted to escape into his house. Meanwhile, his wife, daughter, and a friend were in another part of the house. Hearing the gunshots, his wife entered the kitchen and found Koster chasing Daronco into the house. Koster pushed past her as she tried to hold the kitchen door closed. Daronco tried to barricade himself in his study, where he collapsed and died. Once inside the house, Koster killed himself with a fatal shot to the head.

The Federal Bureau of Investigation determined that Koster and his family had been "consumed with [the] litigation," which had become a "crusade" for them. Charles Koster had spent most of his life savings on his daughter's lawsuit, and his suicide note indicated the killing was vengeance for Daronco's dismissal of the case.

== Legacy ==
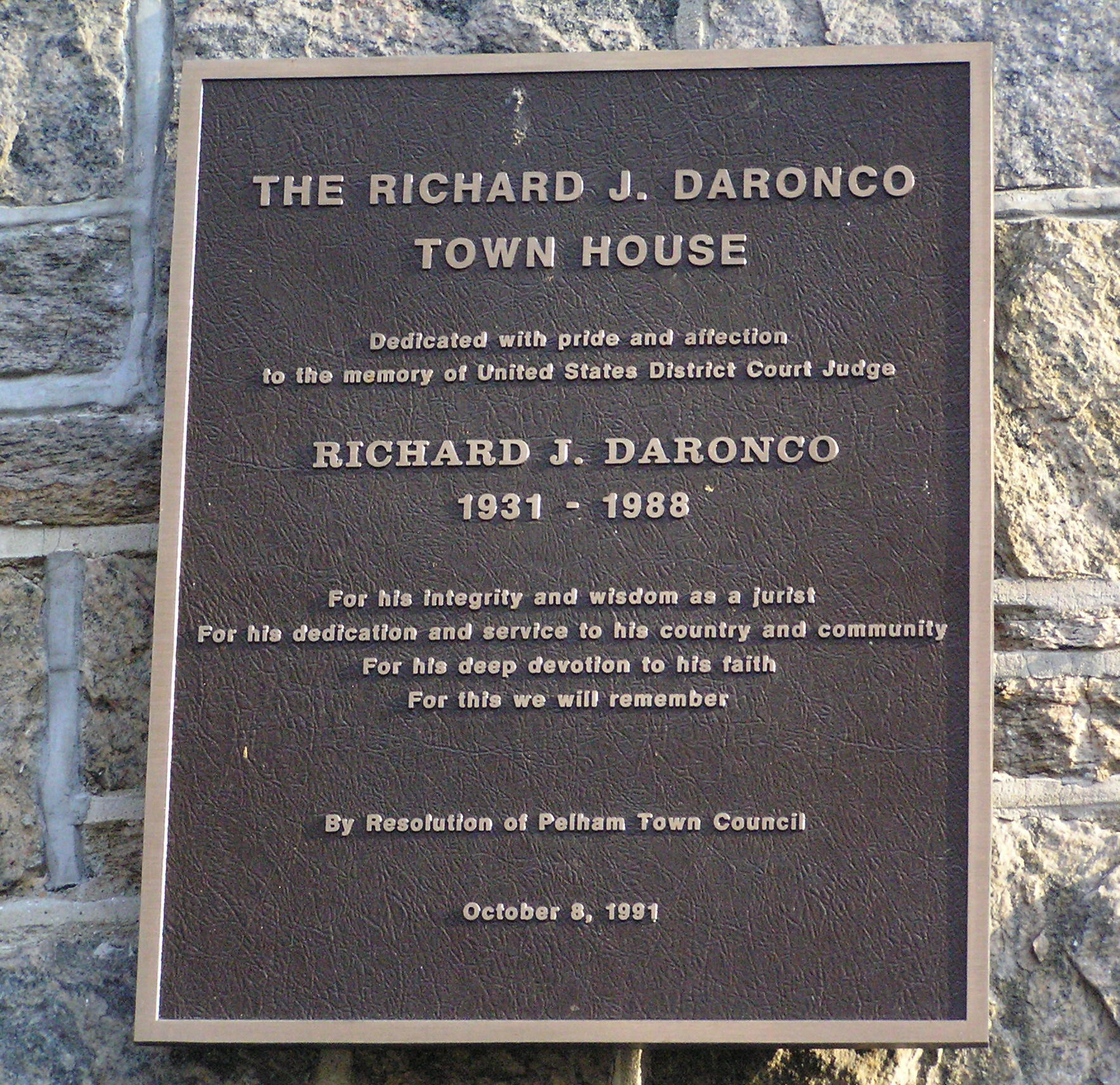
The memorial plaque for Daronco at the Pelham Town House

Daronco was the second of three federal judges to be killed in office in the 20th century. His funeral was held at St. Catherine's Roman Catholic Church in Pelham. Daronco's seat on the federal district court was filled by Louis Freeh.

Because Daronco was on the federal bench for less than 18 months, his widow was ineligible to receive survivor's benefits under the Judicial Survivors' Annuity System. As a result, the United States Congress passed a private bill to compensate Daronco's widowed wife with the amount she would have received under the system, 25% of her husband's salary. However, the bill was pocket vetoed by President George H. W. Bush, who said that he intended to instead approve another bill that would provide benefits for surviving spouses of all assassinated federal judges. The alternative bill was signed into law the following month.

The Westchester County Courthouse in White Plains, where Daronco had worked for many years as a state court judge, was renamed the Richard J. Daronco Westchester County Courthouse. The municipal building adjacent to the Pelham town hall was also renamed the Richard J. Daronco Town House.

== See also ==
- List of assassinated American politicians
- List of United States federal judges killed in office
- List of federal judges appointed by Ronald Reagan

Legal offices
| Preceded by Lee Parsons Gagliardi | Judge of the United States District Court for the Southern District of New York; 1987–1988 | Succeeded by Louis Freeh |
