= United States circuit court =

Pre-1912 class of US federal circuit court

The United States circuit courts were the intermediate level courts of the United States federal court system from 1789 until 1912. They were established by the Judiciary Act of 1789, and had trial court jurisdiction over civil suits of diversity jurisdiction and major federal crimes. They also had appellate jurisdiction over the United States district courts. The Judiciary Act of 1891 (26 Stat. 826, also known as the Evarts Act) transferred their appellate jurisdiction to the newly created United States circuit courts of appeals, which are now known as the United States courts of appeals. On January 1, 1912, the effective date of the Judicial Code of 1911, the circuit courts were abolished, with their remaining trial court jurisdiction transferred to the U.S. district courts.

During the 100 years that the Justices of the U.S. Supreme Court "rode circuit", many justices complained about the effort required. Riding circuit took a great deal of time (about half of the year) and was both physically demanding and dangerous. However, "members of Congress held firm to the belief that circuit riding benefited the justices and the populace, and they turned a deaf ear to the corps of justices that desired to abolish the practice."

The Judiciary Act of 1869 established a separate circuit court (and allowed the hiring of judges specifically to handle the cases) but the act required that Supreme Court justices had to ride circuit once every two years. However, this came to a final end in 1891 when the Circuit Courts of Appeals Act was passed.

== Organization ==
Although the federal judicial districts were grouped into circuits, the circuit courts convened separately in each district and were designated by the name of the district (for example, the "U.S. Circuit Court for the District of Massachusetts"), not by the name or number of the circuit. The designation of circuits served only for the purpose of designating the districts in which a particular Supreme Court Justice, and later a circuit judge, would sit on the circuit court. The circuit court districts were usually, but not always, the same as the districts established for the district courts.

Congress had borrowed the general idea of circuit courts from England, but at their creation, the new United States circuit courts were "a unique institution, whose composition and jurisdiction did not resemble any prior court in England or America." Each circuit court was composed initially of two Supreme Court justices and the district judge of the district, although in 1793 Congress provided that a quorum of one justice and one district judge could hold court. After 1802, only one justice was assigned to each circuit, and a quorum could consist of a single justice or judge. This "circuit riding" arrangement meant that the Supreme Court justices spent the majority of the year traveling to each district within their circuit to conduct trials, and spent far less time assembled at the capital to hear appeals. The burden of circuit riding was somewhat alleviated by the appointment of circuit judges under the Circuit Judges Act of 1869, but was not abolished until the creation of the intermediate courts of appeals in 1891.

In 1801, Congress attempted for the first time in its history to relieve the Supreme Court justices of this burden by enacting the Judiciary Act of 1801, commonly known as the Midnight Judges Act, but that proved to be highly controversial as the Act took effect with only 19 days remaining in John Adams's Federalist administration. Before the oppositional Democratic-Republican administration of Thomas Jefferson took power, Adams took advantage of the Act to nominate several new federal judges expected to support the Federalist agenda. Although Jefferson also nominated a few judges, the Act was repealed after only one year because Jefferson feared the judiciary would become too powerful.

The same act also created the United States Circuit Court of the District of Columbia, a "circuit court" for the District of Columbia. This court had the same original jurisdiction and powers as the United States circuit courts but, unlike those courts, it continued to have its own judges even after the repeal of the Judiciary Act of 1801, and also exercised appellate jurisdiction over justices of the peace and other "local" courts of the District. The District of Columbia was not enumerated among the federal "circuits" at the time. This court was abolished in 1863.

Since each circuit court was initially staffed by sharing judges between the U.S. Supreme Court and each federal district court, the district court clerk usually acted as the circuit court clerk. This arrangement persisted for many years in most federal judicial districts, even after Congress authorized the appointment of circuit judges in 1869 and allowed such judges to appoint a clerk without the concurrence of the district court judge.

== Judges ==
Although any district court judge could be authorized to act as a circuit judge, only fifty judges solely designated as circuit court judges were ever appointed. These can be broadly categorized into four groups:

1. Judges appointed pursuant to the Midnight Judges Act on or after February 20, 1801, and thereafter removed from office with the repeal of that Act on July 1, 1802.
2. Judges appointed to the D.C. Circuit, abolished on March 3, 1863
3. Judges appointed after 1869 pursuant to the Circuit Judges Act of 1869; those in office on June 16, 1891 were transferred to the newly created United States courts of appeals by operation of law, that is, without action on the part of the President.
4. One judge appointed to the California circuit, established in 1855 and abolished on March 3, 1863.

Three circuit court judges, Samuel M. Blatchford, David Josiah Brewer, and William Burnham Woods, were later appointed to the Supreme Court.

=== Circuit court judges appointed pursuant to the Midnight Judges Act ===
Judge	Circuit	Began service	Ended service	Appointed by
Richard Bassett	Third	February 20, 1801	July 1, 1802	John Adams
Thomas Bee	Fifth	Declined	–	John Adams (as chief judge)
Egbert Benson	Second	February 20, 1801	July 1, 1802	John Adams (as chief judge)
Benjamin Bourne	First	February 20, 1801	July 1, 1802	John Adams
Joseph Clay	Fifth	Declined	–	John Adams
William Griffith	Third	February 20, 1801	July 1, 1802	John Adams
Dominic Hall	Fifth	July 1, 1801; Recess	July 1, 1802	Thomas Jefferson
Edward Harris	Fifth	May 3, 1802	July 1, 1802	Thomas Jefferson
Samuel Hitchcock	Second	February 20, 1801	July 1, 1802	John Adams
Jared Ingersoll	Third	Declined	–	John Adams (as chief judge)
Philip Key	Fourth	February 20, 1801	July 1, 1802	John Adams (as chief judge)
Charles Lee	Fourth	Declined	–	John Adams (as chief judge)
John Lowell	First	February 20, 1801	May 6, 1802	John Adams (as chief judge)
Charles Magill	Fourth	March 3, 1801	July 1, 1802	John Adams
William McClung	Sixth	February 20, 1801	July 1, 1802	John Adams
Henry Potter	Fifth	May 9, 1801; Recess	April 7, 1802	Thomas Jefferson
John Sitgreaves	Fifth	Declined	–	John Adams
Jeremiah Smith	First	February 20, 1801	July 1, 1802	John Adams
George Taylor	Fourth	February 20, 1801	July 1, 1802	John Adams
William Tilghman	Third	March 3, 1801	July 1, 1802	John Adams (as chief judge)
Oliver Wolcott	Second	February 20, 1801	July 1, 1802	John Adams

=== Judges of the D.C. Circuit ===
Judge	Circuit	Began service	Ended service	Appointed by
William Cranch	D.C.	February 28, 1801	February 24, 1806	John Adams
William Cranch	D.C.	February 24, 1806	September 1, 1855	Thomas Jefferson (as chief judge) (Note: Because of the unique structure of the United States Circuit Court for the District of Columbia, the elevation of a sitting judge of the Court to chief judge of the Court is considered a separate appointment.)
Allen Duckett	D.C.	March 17, 1806	July 19, 1809	Thomas Jefferson
James Dunlop	D.C.	October 3, 1845; Recess	November 27, 1855	James Polk
James Dunlop	D.C.	November 27, 1855; Recess	March 3, 1863	Franklin Pierce (as chief judge)
Nicholas Fitzhugh	D.C.	November 25, 1803	December 31, 1814	Thomas Jefferson
Thomas Johnson	D.C.	Declined	–	John Adams (as chief judge)
William Kilty	D.C.	March 23, 1801; Recess	January 27, 1806	Thomas Jefferson (as chief judge)
James Marshall	D.C.	March 3, 1801	November 16, 1803	John Adams
William Merrick	D.C.	December 14, 1855	March 3, 1863	Franklin Pierce
James Morsell	D.C.	January 11, 1815	March 3, 1863	James Madison
Buckner Thruston	D.C.	December 14, 1809	August 30, 1845	James Madison

=== Circuit court judges appointed pursuant to the 1869 Act ===
Judge	Circuit	Began service	Ended service	Appointed by
Marcus Acheson	Third	February 3, 1891	June 16, 1891 (Note: Transferred to the corresponding Court of Appeals by operation of law.)	Benjamin Harrison
John Baxter	Sixth	December 13, 1877	April 2, 1886	Rutherford Hayes
Samuel Blatchford	Second	March 4, 1878	March 22, 1882	Rutherford Hayes
Hugh Bond	Fourth	July 13, 1870	June 16, 1891	Ulysses Grant
David Brewer	Eighth	March 31, 1884	December 18, 1889	Chester Arthur
Henry Caldwell	Eighth	March 4, 1890	June 16, 1891	Benjamin Harrison
LeBaron Colt	First	July 5, 1884	June 16, 1891	Chester Arthur
John Dillon	Eighth	December 22, 1869	September 1, 1879	Ulysses Grant
Thomas Drummond	Seventh	December 22, 1869	July 18, 1884	Ulysses Grant
Halmer Emmons	Sixth	January 17, 1870	May 14, 1877	Ulysses Grant
Walter Gresham	Seventh	October 28, 1884; Recess	June 16, 1891	Chester Arthur
Howell Jackson	Sixth	April 12, 1886	June 16, 1891	Grover Cleveland
Alexander Johnson	Second	October 25, 1875; Recess	January 26, 1878	Ulysses Grant
Emile Lacombe	Second	May 26, 1887; Recess	June 16, 1891	Grover Cleveland
John Lowell	First	December 18, 1878	May 1, 1884	Rutherford Hayes
George McCrary	Eighth	December 9, 1879	March 18, 1884	Rutherford Hayes
William McKennan	Third	December 22, 1869	January 3, 1891	Ulysses Grant
Don Pardee	Fifth	May 13, 1881	June 16, 1891	James Garfield
Lorenzo Sawyer	Ninth	January 10, 1870	June 16, 1891	Ulysses Grant
George Shepley	First	December 22, 1869	July 20, 1878	Ulysses Grant
William Wallace	Second	April 16, 1882	June 16, 1891	Chester Arthur
Lewis Woodruff	Second	December 22, 1869	September 10, 1875	Ulysses Grant
William Woods	Fifth	December 22, 1869	December 23, 1880	Ulysses Grant

=== Circuit court judge of California ===
Judge	Circuit	Began service	Ended service	Appointed by
Matthew McAllister	California	March 3, 1855	January 12, 1863	Franklin Pierce

== See also ==
- List of presidents of the United States by judicial appointments
