= Thruston =

Thruston is a surname and may refer to:

- Buckner Thruston (1763–1845), U.S. Senator and federal judge, father of Charles Mynn (Union general)
- Charles Mynn Thruston (colonel) (1738–1812), colonel of a Continental Army regiment, father of Buckner
- Charles Mynn Thruston (1798–1873), brigadier general in the Union Army
- Gates P. Thruston (1835–1912), American lawyer, businessman and collector
- Lucy Meacham Thruston (1862–1938), American writer of historical novels
- Malachi Thruston, Colonial Virginia court clerk, planter and burgess

Thruston may refer to people with the first or middle name Thruston:

- S. Thruston Ballard (1855–1926), lieutenant governor of Kentucky
- Thruston Ballard Morton (1907–1982), Congressman from Kentucky

== Military ==
- Thruston's Additional Continental Regiment, an American infantry unit in the American Revolutionary War

== Similar spellings ==
- Threston
- Thurston (disambiguation)
- Thruxton (disambiguation)
