= Cranch =

Cranch is a surname. Notable people with the surname include:

- Christopher Pearse Cranch (1813–1892), American writer and artist
- John Cranch (naturalist) (1758–1816), English naturalist and explorer
- John Cranch (American painter) (1807–1891), American painter
- John Cranch (English painter) (1751–1821), English painter
- William Cranch (1769–1855), American judge

== See also ==
- Duncanson-Cranch House, listed on the National Register of Historic Places in Washington, D.C.
