= Mynn =

Mynn is an English surname. Notable people with this surname include:

- Alfred Mynn (1807–1861), English cricket player
- Charles Mynn Thruston (1798–1873), American soldier, farmer and politician
- Charles Mynn Thruston (colonel) (1738–1812), American soldier
- Nicholas Mynn (fl. 1558–1572), English politician
- Walter Mynn (1805–1878), English amateur cricket player who played between 1833 and 1852

== See also ==
- MYNN is the ICAO code of Lynden Pindling International Airport, Bahamas
