= Stettinius =

Stettinius may refer to:

- Stettinius (surname)
- Stettinius v. United States
- Taft Stettinius & Hollister
