= Thomas Marshall (Virginia politician, born 1730) =

American politician

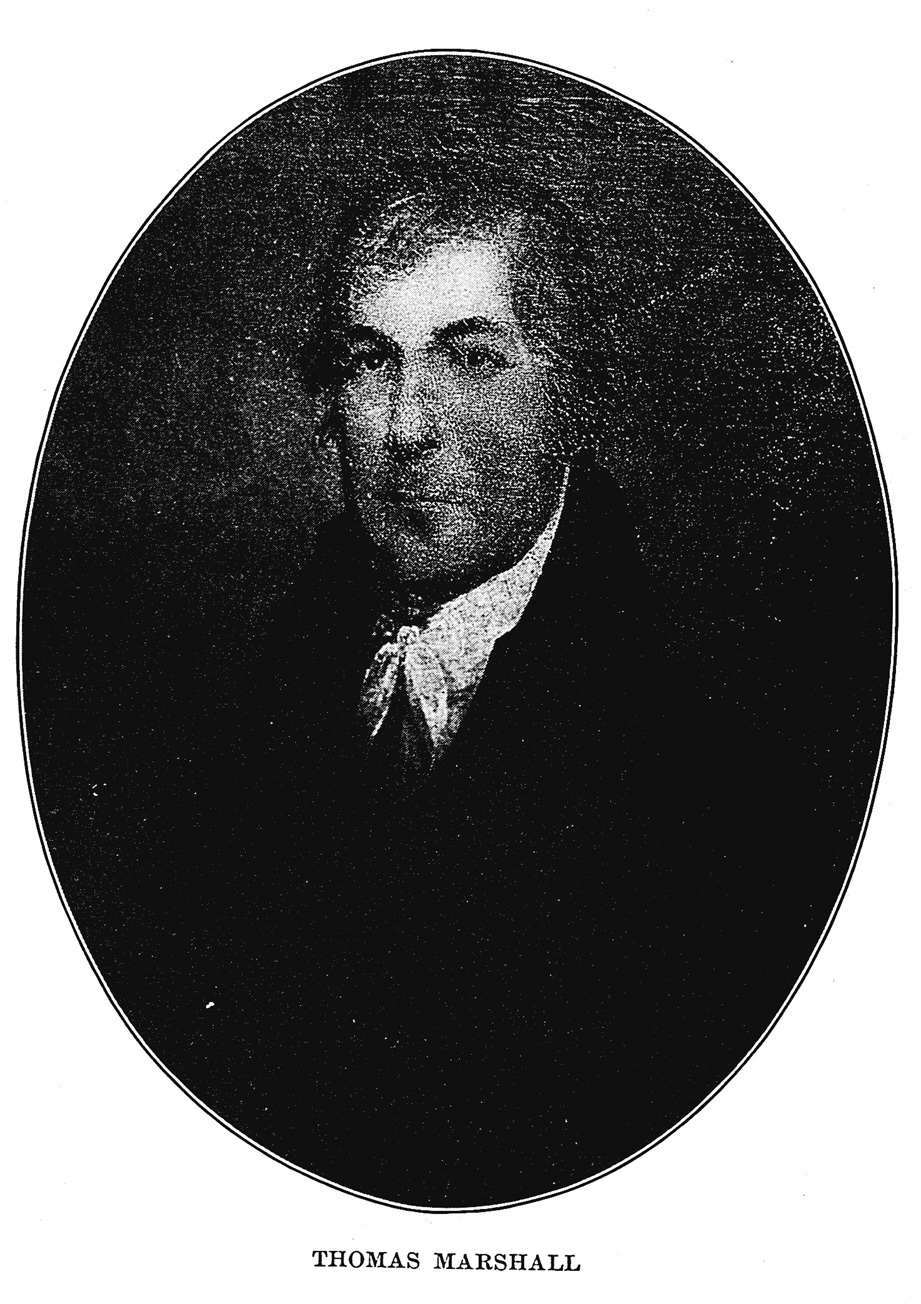

Member of the Virginia House of Delegates from Fayette County
- In office October 15, 1787-June 1788 Serving with Joseph Fowler
- Preceded by: Joseph Crockett
- Succeeded by: James Trotter

Member of the House of Burgesses from Fauquier County, Colony of Virginia,
- In office 1769-1773 Serving with James Scott
- Preceded by: Thomas Harrison
- Succeeded by: position abolished
- In office 1761-1768 Serving with Thomas Harrison
- Preceded by: n/a
- Succeeded by: James Scott

Personal details
- Born: April 2, 1730 Westmoreland County, Colony of Virginia, British America
- Died: June 22, 1802 (aged 72) Mason County, Kentucky
- Spouse: Mary Isham Keith
- Children: 15 including John Marshall, James Markham Marshall, Louis Marshall,
- Profession: surveyor, planter, politician

Military service
- Allegiance: Great Britain; United States
- Branch/service: Virginia Militia; Continental Army
- Years of service: 1752–1758 (Virginia Militia); 1775–1783 (Continental Army)
- Rank: Colonel (Virginia Militia); Colonel 3rd Virginia Regiment(Continental Army)
- Battles/wars: French and Indian War; Braddock Expedition; American Revolutionary War; Battle of Brandywine; Battle of Germantown; South Carolina campaign

Thomas Marshall (2 April 1730 – 22 June 1802) was a Virginia surveyor, planter, military officer and politician who served in the House of Burgesses and briefly in the Virginia House of Delegates and helped form the state of Kentucky, but may be best known as the father of Chief Justice of the United States Supreme Court John Marshall. Marshall opposed slavery in Ohio but practiced and proposed indentured servitude of former slaves.

== Early life and education ==
Marshall was born in Washington parish, Westmoreland County, Virginia to the former Elizabeth Markham and her planter husband, John Marshall. His father was sometimes nicknamed "John of the Forest," from the estate that he owned. His name honored his Virginia-born planter grandfather, Thomas Marshall (1655–1704). His great-grandfather, another John Marshall, a captain of cavalry in the service of Charles I had emigrated to Virginia about 1650, and came to own a large plantation. The family included a brother William Marshall (1735–1809), who became a Baptist clergyman and like Thomas Marshall moved to what became Fauquier County in 1752. At some point William was arrested for illegal preaching, and moved to Kentucky in 1780 where he established the Fox River Church in Henry County and eventually died near Eminence, Kentucky.

Virginia having no public schools at the time, Thomas Marshall attended Rev. Archibald Campbell's school. Marshall was qualified as a surveyor by the Virginia government (such examinations being one function of the then-small College of William and Mary).

== Personal life ==
In 1754 Marshall married Mary Randolph Keith, daughter of Rev. James Keith, an Episcopal clergyman of Fauquier County and Mary Isham Randolph of the Randolph family of Virginia, one of the First Families of Virginia. Mary Isham Keith Marshall gave birth to John Marshall and fourteen other children who all lived well into adulthood. Their most notable children were: Thomas Marshall (born in Fauquier County, 27 October 1761; died in Mason County, Kentucky, 19 March 1817), who served in the American Revolution, attained the rank of captain, settled in Kentucky in 1790, and was an active member of the convention that formed the second constitution of the state in 1799; James Markham Marshall, a lawyer who was a federal judge for a short time and performed diplomatic errands for the U.S. government; Alexander Keith Marshall (born in Fauquier County in 1770; died in Mason County, Kentucky, 7 February 1825), a lawyer; Louis Marshall, a physician and later an educator, as the subsequent president of two U.S. colleges and two other sons, born as twins on January 31, 1767, who also became lawyers, William Marshall (who served as Commonwealth Attorney for Richmond after the war) and Charles Marshall (who served a single term in the Virginia House of Delegates representing Fauquier County in 1792)

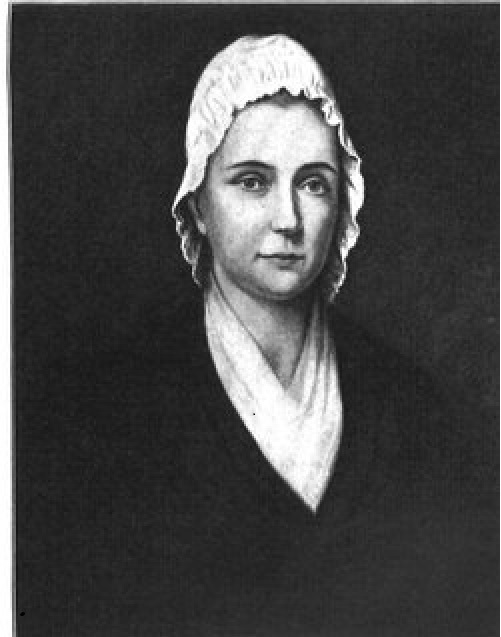
Mary Randolph Keith

.

== Career ==
Marshall and George Washington conducted surveying excursions in the Northern Neck Proprietary for Lord Fairfax and others. In 1753 Marshall became an agent of Lord Fairfax, collecting quitrents and otherwise superintending a portion of his estate in what had become Fauquier County. Following his military experience in the French and Indian War described below, in 1765 he moved to Goose Creek. Marshall and his family lived within the proprietary in what became Fauquier County and would after this and further military service described below receive several thousand acres of land in western Virginia (some that later became Kentucky and other land became West Virginia long after his lifetime).

When Fauquier County was established, its voters elected Thomas Harrison and Fairfax as their first two (part-time) representatives in the House of Burgesses. Marshall won re-election, but then resigned to accept the post of Fauquier County sheriff. After serving in that post for a year, he won election again to the part-time delegate position, but resigned in 1773 to become clerk of the new Dunmore County. His son James Markham Marshall won the Fauquier seat in 1775 (in what became the last session of the House of Burgesses). Both Marshalls came to condemn the encroachments of the crown's representative upon Virginians' liberties. After Lord Dunmore suppressed Virginia's legislature, both Thomas Marshall and James Scott won election as Fauquier County's representatives to the first four Virginia Revolutionary Conventions (with James Marshall as a third representative to the First Revolutionary Convention). After neither elected Fauquier representative actually showed at the Fourth Convention (in Marshall's case possibly because of further military responsibilities), Martin Pickett replaced Marshall in the Fifth Convention.

In 1773 Marshall purchased "The Oaks" plantation (now the historic private home Oak Hill) in Leeds parish in the northern part of Fauquier County. He would farm that plantation using enslaved labor, as would his sons. He gave his firstborn son, John Marshall, one slave after he returned from the War. Thomas Marshall owned other slaves by the 1787 Virginia Tax Census after he moved to Kentucky as described below, probably including 7 adult slaves and 12 enslaved children in Fayette County, Kentucky as well as 11 horses and 27 cattle.

== Military experience ==
A lieutenant in the Virginia militia during the French and Indian War, Marshall participated in the Braddock Expedition against Fort Duquesne, under George Washington. However, since Washington detailed him to command one of the garrison at Fort Necessity, Marshall was not present at the defeat.

In 1775, on the summons of Patrick Henry, Marshall recruited a battalion and became major of a regiment known as the "Culpeper Minutemen." He afterward became colonel of the 3rd Virginia Regiment. His sons Thomas Marshall and John Marshall also became officers. At the Battle of Brandywine, Thomas Marshall's command was placed in a wood on the right, and, though attacked by greatly superior numbers, maintained its position without losing an inch of ground until its ammunition was nearly expended and more than half its officers and one third of the soldiers were killed or wounded. The safety of the Continental Army on this occasion was largely due to the good conduct of Colonel Marshall and his command. The House of Burgesses voted him a sword. At Germantown, his regiment covered the retreat of the Continental Army. He was with Washington at Valley Forge, Pennsylvania. He was afterward ordered to the south, and was surrendered by General Lincoln at Charleston in 1780. When paroled Marshall took advantage of the circumstance to make his first visit to Kentucky on horseback over the mountains, and then located the lands on which he subsequently lived in Woodford. After returning to Virginia, Marshall resumed his command and held it until the close of the war. In 1781 he was for a time in command at York.

== Kentucky ==
In 1783 Marshall was appointed surveyor general of the lands in Kentucky due to officers and soldier of Virginia's Continental Line. He established his office in Lexington. Two years later, Marshall left his Fauquier County farm in the hands of a son and removed the rest of his family to Kentucky.

In 1787 and 1788 Fayette County voters elected Marshall represented in the Virginia House of Delegates. In the latter year he was also a delegate to the convention in Danville to consider the separation of Kentucky from Virginia. He was appointed by Washington collector of revenue for Kentucky. He and his immediate family were all Federalists.

== Death and legacy ==
Marshall died in Mason County, Kentucky in 1802. In addition to his sons who served in the Virginia House of Delegates, a grandson also named Thomas Marshall (the son of his son John Marshall), also served in the Virginia House of Delegates and Alexander Keith Marshall (son of Louis Marshall) served one term in the U.S. House of Representatives.
