= 3rd Virginia Regiment =

- Active: 1775–1783
- Branch: Infantry
- Type: Line infantry
- Part of: Virginia Line
- Engagements: New York Campaign, Battle of Trenton, Battle of Princeton, Battle of Brandywine, Battle of Germantown, Battle of Monmouth, Siege of Charleston

Commanders
- Notable commanders: Colonel Hugh Mercer; Colonel George Weedon; Colonel Thomas Nelson Jr

The 3rd Virginia Regiment was raised on December 28, 1775, at Alexandria, Virginia, for service with the Continental Army. The 3rd Virginia's initial commander was Colonel Hugh Mercer, who was quickly promoted to brigadier general. Its second commander, George Weedon, was also promoted to brigadier general within a few months. Weedon was succeeded in command by Colonel Thomas Marshall, the father of Supreme Court Chief Justice John Marshall. During its time at Valley Forge its commander was Colonel William Heth. The regiment saw action in the New York Campaign, the Battles of Trenton, Princeton, Brandywine, Germantown, Monmouth and the Siege of Charleston. Most of the regiment was captured at Charlestown, South Carolina, on May 12, 1780, by the British, and the regiment was formally disbanded on November 15, 1783. James Monroe, Thomas Helm, John Francis Mercer, and James Markham Marshall served as lieutenants in this regiment.

== Battle of Trenton ==
On December 26, 1776, the vanguard was the 6th Company led by Captain William Washington and Lt. James Monroe. "When the Hessians rolled out a field gun midway on King Street, a half dozen Virginians led by Captain William Washington (a distant cousin of the commander) and Lieutenant James Monroe rushed forward, seized it, and turned it on them."
