= List of federal judges appointed by John Adams =

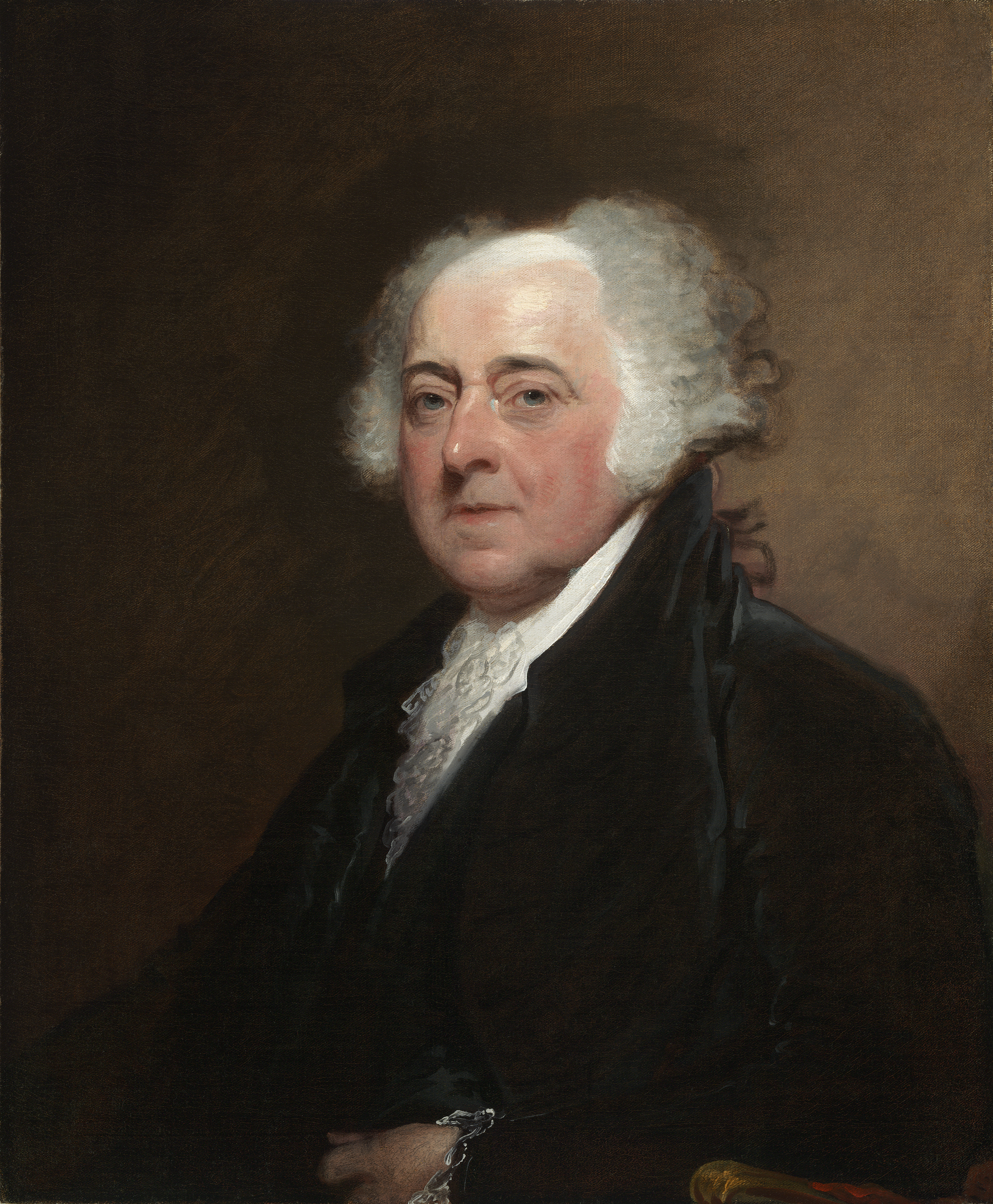
President John Adams saw most of his appointments undone when the circuit courts to which they were appointed were abolished.

Following is a list of all Article III United States federal judges appointed by President John Adams. In total, John Adams appointed 23 Article III United States federal judges during his tenure (1797–1801) as President of the United States. Of these, 3 were appointments to the Supreme Court of the United States, 16 were to the United States circuit courts, and 4 to the United States district courts. Fourteen of the sixteen circuit court judges appointed by Adams were to positions created at the end of his tenure in office, in the Judiciary Act of 1801, 2 Stat. 89, which became known as the Midnight Judges Act. All of these offices were abolished by the repeal of this Act on July 1, 1802, by 2 Stat. 132. The remaining two were to judgeships for the District of Columbia, authorized under a different Act of Congress, not the Judiciary Act.

Nonetheless, Adams made an indelible impact on the federal judiciary with the appointment of John Marshall as Chief Justice to succeed Oliver Ellsworth, who had retired due to ill health. Adams himself called this appointment "the proudest act of my life."

The appointment of Chief Justice John Marshall was considered the most significant impact that Adams had on the judiciary.

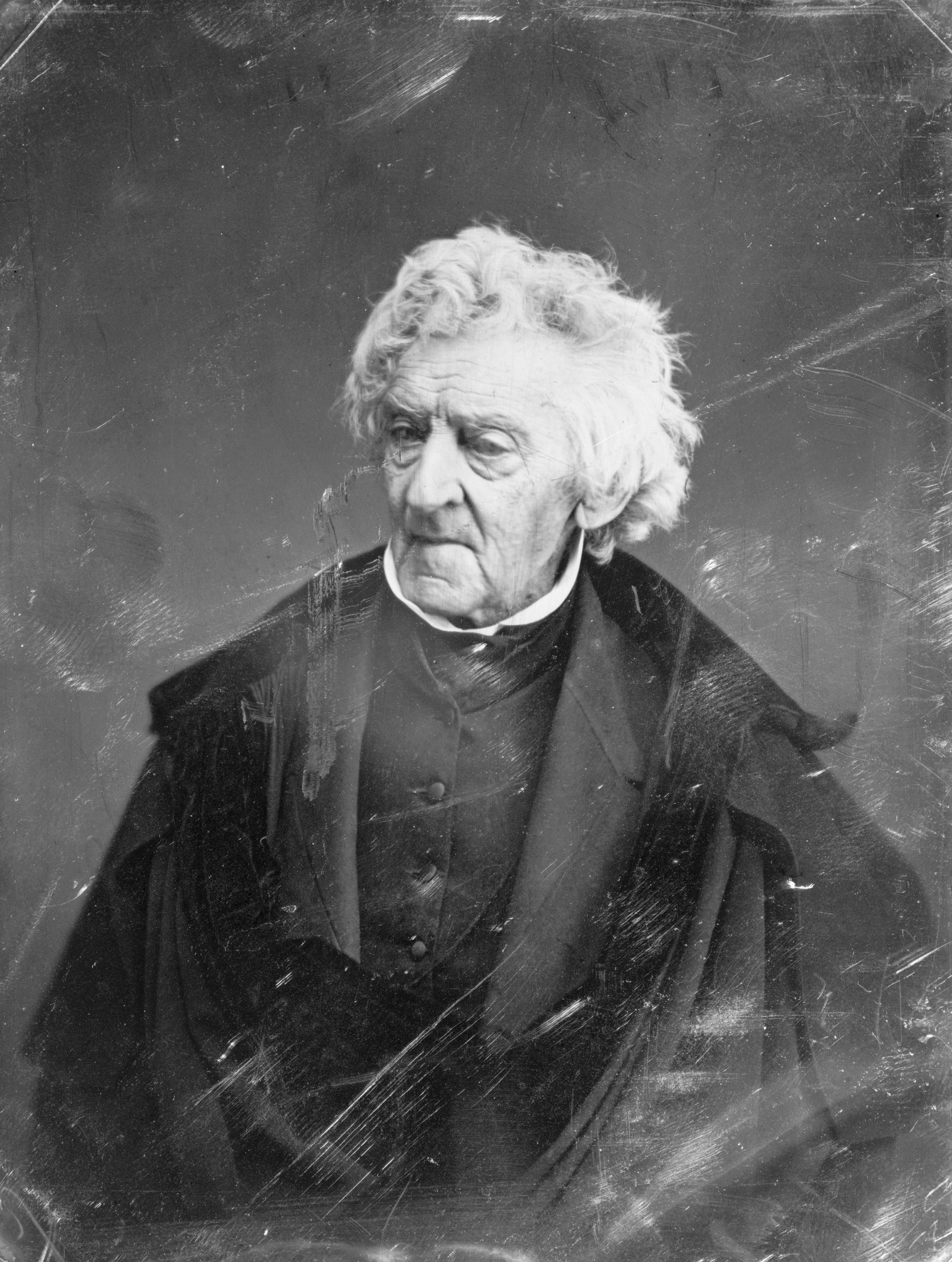
William Cranch was later elevated by Thomas Jefferson to Chief Judge of the District of Columbia Circuit, and was one of the longest-serving federal judges in U.S. history.

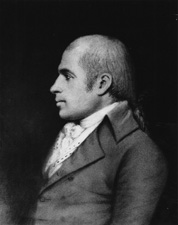
Elijah Paine was one of two District Court judges appointed by Adams whose service surpassed the forty year mark.

== United States Supreme Court justices ==
| # | Justice | Seat | State | Former justice | Nomination date | Confirmation date | Began active service | Ended active service |
|---|---|---|---|---|---|---|---|---|
| 1 | Bushrod Washington | 3 | Virginia | James Wilson | December 19, 1798 | December 20, 1798 | September 29, 1798 | November 26, 1829 |
| 2 | Alfred Moore | 5 | North Carolina | James Iredell | December 4, 1799 | December 10, 1799 | December 10, 1799 | January 26, 1804 |
| 3 | John Marshall | Chief | Virginia | Oliver Ellsworth | January 20, 1801 | January 27, 1801 | January 31, 1801 | July 6, 1835 |

Also appointed, but declined: John Jay (Chief Justice).

== Circuit courts ==
| # | Judge | Circuit | Nomination date | Confirmation date | Began active service | Ended active service |
|---|---|---|---|---|---|---|
| 1 | Richard Bassett | Third | February 18, 1801 | February 20, 1801 | February 20, 1801 | July 1, 1802 |
| 2 | Egbert Benson | Second | February 18, 1801 | February 20, 1801 | February 20, 1801 | July 1, 1802 |
| 3 | Benjamin Bourne | First | February 18, 1801 | February 20, 1801 | February 20, 1801 | July 1, 1802 |
| 4 | William Griffith | Third | February 18, 1801 | February 20, 1801 | February 20, 1801 | July 1, 1802 |
| 5 | Samuel Hitchcock | Second | February 18, 1801 | February 20, 1801 | February 20, 1801 | July 1, 1802 |
| 6 | Philip Barton Key | Fourth | February 18, 1801 | February 20, 1801 | February 20, 1801 | March 3, 1801 |
| 6.1 | Philip Barton Key | Fourth | February 25, 1801 | February 26, 1801 | March 3, 1801 | July 1, 1802 |
| 7 | John Lowell | First | February 18, 1801 | February 20, 1801 | February 20, 1801 | May 6, 1802 |
| 8 | Jeremiah Smith | First | February 18, 1801 | February 20, 1801 | February 20, 1801 | July 1, 1802 |
| 9 | George Keith Taylor | Fourth | February 18, 1801 | February 20, 1801 | February 20, 1801 | July 1, 1802 |
| 10 | Oliver Wolcott Jr. | Second | February 18, 1801 | February 20, 1801 | February 20, 1801 | July 1, 1802 |
| 11 | William McClung | Sixth | February 21, 1801 | February 24, 1801 | February 24, 1801 | July 1, 1802 |
| 12 | William Cranch | D.C. | February 28, 1801 | March 3, 1801 | March 3, 1801 | February 24, 1806 |
| 13 | Charles Magill | Fourth | February 25, 1801 | February 26, 1801 | March 3, 1801 | July 1, 1802 |
| 14 | James Markham Marshall | D.C. | February 28, 1801 | March 3, 1801 | March 3, 1801 | November 16, 1803 |
| 15 | William Tilghman | Third | February 26, 1801 | March 2, 1801 | March 3, 1801 | July 1, 1802 |

Also appointed, but declined: Thomas Bee (5th circuit), Joseph Clay Jr. (5th circuit), Jared Ingersoll (3rd circuit), Thomas Johnson (D.C. circuit), Charles Lee (4th circuit), and John Sitgreaves (5th circuit).

== District courts ==
| # | Judge | Court (Note: See List of United States district and territorial courts) | Nomination date | Confirmation date | Began active service | Ended active service |
|---|---|---|---|---|---|---|
| 1 | John Sloss Hobart | D.N.Y. | April 11, 1798 | April 12, 1798 | April 12, 1798 | February 4, 1805 |
| 2 | James Winchester | D. Md. | December 5, 1799 | December 10, 1799 | October 31, 1799 | April 5, 1806 |
| 3 | John Davis | D. Mass. | February 18, 1801 | February 20, 1801 | February 20, 1801 | July 10, 1841 |
| 4 | Elijah Paine | D. Vt. | February 24, 1801 | February 25, 1801 | March 3, 1801 | April 1, 1842 |

== See also ==
- Marbury v. Madison (1803)
- Stuart v. Laird (1803)
- United States v. More (1805)

== Sources ==
- Federal Judicial Center
