= Alexander Keith Marshall =

American politician

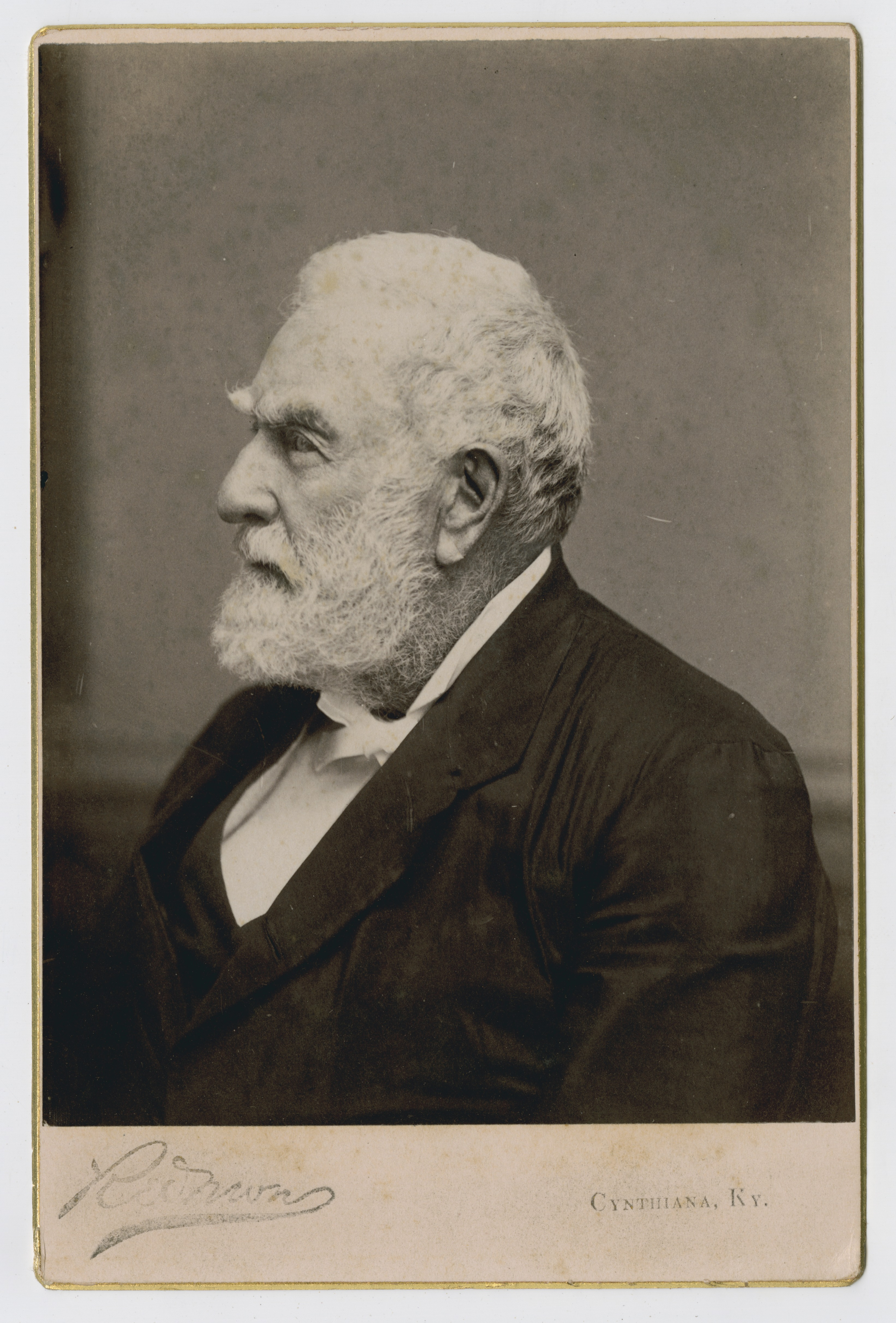
- Gelatin Photograph of Marshall

Member of the U.S. House of Representatives from Kentucky's 8th district
- In office March 4, 1855 – March 3, 1857
- Preceded by: John C. Breckinridge
- Succeeded by: James Brown Clay

Personal details
- Born: February 11, 1808 Buck Pond, Versailles, Kentucky, U.S.
- Died: April 28, 1884 (aged 76) Montreal, Quebec, Canada
- Resting place: Lexington Cemetery, Fayette County, Kentucky
- Party: American
- Relatives: Louis Marshall (father); Thomas Francis Marshall, Edward Colston Marshall (brothers)<
- Education: University of Pennsylvania
- Profession: medical doctor

Alexander Keith Marshall (February 11, 1808 – April 28, 1884) was an American medical doctor who became aligned with the Know Nothing Party (sometimes called the "American party") and served a single term as a United States Representative from Kentucky.

== Early and family life ==
Marshall was born at Buck Pond, near Versailles, Woodford County, Kentucky. His father Louis Marshall was a younger brother of U.S. Supreme Court Chief Justice John Marshall, and himself served as president of several universities. His eldest brother Thomas Francis Marshall (1801–1864) served in the Kentucky legislature and U.S. House of Representatives in 1841–1843 (before their mother's death). Another brother, William Louis Marshall (1803–1879) became a major with the Maryland Volunteers during the American Civil War but survived the conflict and moved to California where he later died. Their youngest brother Edward Colston Marshall (1821–1893), also became a U.S. Congressman (from a California district 1851–1853) after serving in the U.S. Army during the Mexican War, then remained loyal to the Union during the American Civil War and served as California's Attorney General (1883–1887). Their sister Agatha Madison Marshall Logan (1818–1858) married Caleb Wallace Logan, the son of attorney and U.S. Senator William Harrison Logan, and who bore five daughters before her death.

After a private education appropriate to his class, Marshall settled in Nicholasville, the county seat of Jessamine County in the center of the state. Studying medicine, he graduated from the medical department of the University of Pennsylvania in Philadelphia in 1844.

== Personal life ==
Marshall married and had at least one son, Louis C. Marshall (1835–1908) who remained in Lexington.

== Career ==
Marshall practiced medicine at Nicholasville, Kentucky.

Marshall was a member of the Kentucky constitutional convention held in Frankfort, Kentucky in 1849. He became a member of the Know Nothing Party and was elected as a candidate of the American Party to the Thirty-fourth Congress (March 4, 1855 – March 3, 1857), succeeding John C. Breckinridge (who had been elected to the U.S. Senate). However, he only served a single term, losing to attorney James B. Clay, son of Kentucky's Henry Clay. By the 1850 census, he was living in a boarding house in Jessamine County and characterized himself as a "mail contractor." Dr. Marshall then moved to Missouri, but returned to Kentucky and settled in Fayette County where he resumed his medical practice as well as farmed.

== Death and legacy ==
Marshall died near East Hickman, Fayette County, Kentucky in 1884 and was interred at Lexington Cemetery, as would be his son Louis decades later.

U.S. House of Representatives
Preceded by John C. Breckinridge	Member of the U.S. House of Representatives from Kentucky's 8th congressional district 1855 – 1857	Succeeded by James B. Clay
