= Stettinius v. United States =

US case law

Stettinius v. United States
Circuit Court, District of Columbia
November, 1839 Term

Full case name:	Stettinius v. United States
Citations:
Prior history:	Judgment for the Appellant, appeal from the United States District Court for the District of Columbia
Subsequent history:

Holding
Reversed conviction of Appellant for counterfeiting.
Court membership

Circuit Judges William Cranch, Thruston

Case opinions

Majority by: William Cranch, for the Court

Laws applied

Stettinius v. United States, 22 F. Cas. 1322 (C.C.D.C. 1839), was a decision of the United States Circuit Court of the District of Columbia that was handed down in November 1839. It reversed the conviction of a defendant for unlawfully passing paper currency because the indictment did not properly aver, and the verdict did not properly find that the notes he had allegedly passed were indeed paper currency.

The defendant argued that he should be allowed to offer his construction of the law to the jury as an alternative to the trial court's interpretation. That prompted a detailed review by the Circuit Court of the law regarding jury nullification. The court concluded that while parties may argue a point of law to the jury before the court has ruled on it, they have no right to do so afterward.

US Attorney Francis Scott Key argued the case for the government.
