= George Keith Taylor =

American judge (1769–1815)

Judge of the United States Circuit Court for the Fourth Circuit
- In office February 20, 1801 – July 1, 1802
- Appointed by: John Adams
- Preceded by: Seat established by 2 Stat. 89
- Succeeded by: Seat abolished

Personal details
- Born: George Keith Taylor; March 16, 1769 Petersburg, Colony of Virginia, British America
- Died: November 9, 1815 (aged 46) Petersburg, Virginia
- Education: College of William & Mary

George Keith Taylor (March 16, 1769 – November 9, 1815) was a United States circuit judge of the United States Circuit Court for the Fourth Circuit.

== Education and career ==
Born on March 16, 1769, in Petersburg, Colony of Virginia, British America, Taylor attended the College of William & Mary. He engaged in private practice in Petersburg, Virginia, until 1795, from 1797 to 1798, and from 1800 to 1801. He was a member of the Virginia House of Delegates from 1795 to 1796 and from 1798 to 1799.

== Federal judicial service ==
Taylor was nominated by President John Adams on February 18, 1801, to the United States Circuit Court for the Fourth Circuit, to a new seat authorized by 2 Stat. 89. He was confirmed by the United States Senate on February 20, 1801, and received his commission the same day. His service terminated on July 1, 1802, due to abolition of the court.

== Later career and death ==
Following his departure from the federal bench, Taylor resumed private practice in Petersburg from 1802 to 1815. He died of influenza on November 9, 1815, in Petersburg.

== Sources ==
Legal offices
| Preceded by Seat established by 2 Stat. 89 | Judge of the United States Circuit Court for the Fourth Circuit; 1801–1802 | Succeeded by Seat abolished |
