= William McClung =

American judge (1758–1811)

Judge of the United States Circuit Court for the Sixth Circuit
- In office February 24, 1801 – July 1, 1802
- Appointed by: John Adams
- Preceded by: Seat established by 2 Stat. 89
- Succeeded by: Seat abolished

Personal details
- Born: William McClung; July 28, 1758 Rockbridge County, Colony of Virginia, British America
- Died: 1811 (aged 52–53) Mason County, Kentucky
- Education: Washington and Lee University read law

William McClung (July 12, 1758 – 1811) was a United States circuit judge of the United States Circuit Court for the Sixth Circuit.

== Education and career ==
Born on July 12, 1758, in Rockbridge County, Colony of Virginia, British America, McClung graduated from Liberty Hall Academy (now Washington and Lee University) in 1785 and read law. He entered private practice in Bardstown, District of Kentucky, Virginia (State of Kentucky from June 1, 1792) from 1791 to 1796. He was a member of the Kentucky House of Representatives in 1793. He was a member of the Kentucky Senate from 1796 to 1800.

== Federal judicial service ==
McClung was nominated by President John Adams on February 21, 1801, to the United States Circuit Court for the Sixth Circuit, to a new seat authorized by 2 Stat. 89. He was confirmed by the United States Senate on February 24, 1801, and received his commission the same day. His service terminated on July 1, 1802, due to abolition of the court.

== Later career and death ==
Following his departure from the federal bench, McClung was a Judge of the Kentucky Circuit Court in Nelson County until 1811. He died in 1811 in Mason County, Kentucky.

== Sources ==
- The McClung genealogy - By William McClung

Legal offices
Preceded by Seat established by 2 Stat. 89	Judge of the United States Circuit Court for the Sixth Circuit; 1801–1802	Succeeded by Seat abolished
