= Edward Harris (North Carolina judge) =

American judge (1763–1813)

Judge of the United States Circuit Court for the Fifth Circuit
- In office May 3, 1802 – July 1, 1802
- Appointed by: Thomas Jefferson
- Preceded by: Henry Potter
- Succeeded by: Seat abolished

Personal details
- Born: Edward Harris; March 5, 1763 Iredell County, Province of North Carolina, British America
- Died: March 28, 1813 (aged 50) Lumberton, North Carolina
- Education: read law

Edward Harris (March 5, 1763 – March 28, 1813) was a United States circuit judge of the United States Circuit Court for the Fifth Circuit.

== Education and career ==
Born on March 5, 1763, in Iredell County, Province of North Carolina, British America, Harris read law in 1791. He entered private practice in New Bern, North Carolina starting in 1791.

== Federal judicial service ==
Harris was nominated by President Thomas Jefferson on April 27, 1802, to a seat on the United States Circuit Court for the Fifth Circuit vacated by Judge Henry Potter. He was confirmed by the United States Senate on April 29, 1802, and received his commission on May 3, 1802. His service terminated on July 1, 1802, due to abolition of the court.

== Later career ==
Harris was a member of the North Carolina House of Commons (now the North Carolina House of Representatives) from 1802 to 1803, and in 1807. He was a Trustee for the University of North Carolina from 1805 to 1813. He was a Judge of the North Carolina Superior Court from 1811 to 1813.

== Death ==
Harris died on March 28, 1813, in Lumberton, North Carolina.

Legal offices
| Preceded by Henry Potter | Judge of the United States Circuit Court for the Fifth Circuit; 1802 | Succeeded by Seat abolished |
