= United States v. Fenwick =

- Court: United States Circuit Court of the District of Columbia
- Decided: April 7, 1836
- Citation: 25 F. Cas. 1062, 1964 (C.C. D.C. 1836)

Case history
- Prior actions: Judgment for the Appellant, appeal from the United States District Court of the District of Columbia

Holding
- Conviction for rioting

Case opinions
- William Cranch

Keywords
- Rioting

United States v. Fenwick, United States v. Fenwick, 25 F. Cas. 1062, 1964 (C.C. D.C. 1836), was a decision of the United States Circuit Court of the District of Columbia that was handed down April 7, 1836. It confirmed the right of a defendant in a criminal case not to have the judge render a decision on motions until all arguments have been made, to defer making those arguments until the jury is empaneled, and to make those legal arguments to the jury.

== See also ==
- United States District Court for the District of Columbia
- List of notable United States Courts of Appeals cases

== References and external links ==
- HTML of the decision from the DC Circuit
