= Louis Marshall (educator) =

American educator

Louis Marshall (Fauquier County, Virginia, 7 October 1773 – Buckpond, Kentucky, April 1866) was an American educator.

== Biography ==
He was the son of Thomas Marshall, and brother of U.S. Chief Justice John Marshall. He was educated at home, studied medicine in Edinburgh, and spent several years in Paris, participating in the attack upon the Bastille. He was arrested during the Reign of Terror and condemned to death, but was rescued by the intervention of his elder brothers. He attained note as a physician, but his taste for literature and languages caused him to abandon his profession, and he then established an academy in Woodford County, Kentucky. He was president of Washington College, Virginia, in 1838, and afterward of Transylvania University, Kentucky. He died in Woodford County, Kentucky, in 1866, one year after the end of the American Civil War.

== Family ==
His sons Thomas Francis Marshall, Edward C. Marshall and Alexander Keith Marshall all served single terms in the United States House of Representatives at various times and representing different districts.

== See also ==
- Alexander Keith McClung, nephew and student

== Notes ==
Academic offices
| Preceded by Henry Ruffner | President of Washington and Lee University; 1830—1834 | Succeeded by Henry Vethake |
