= Henry Potter (judge) =

American judge (1766–1857)

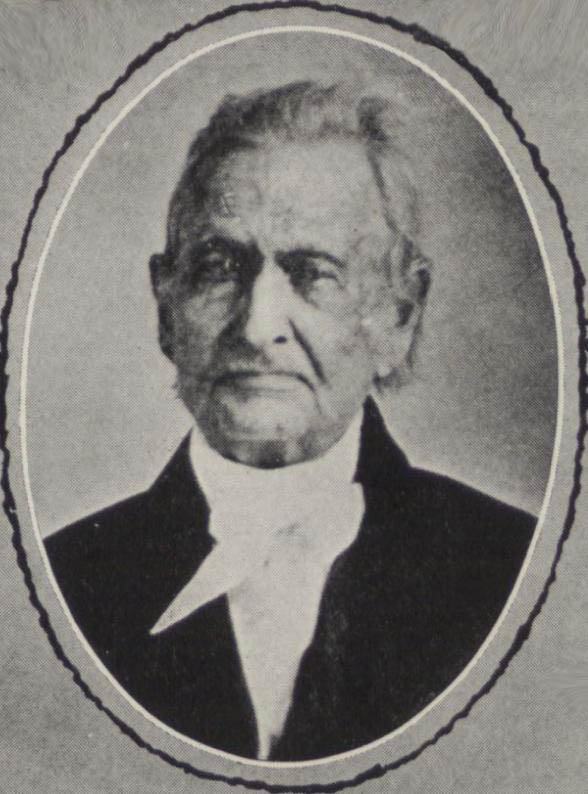

Judge of the United States District Court for the District of North Carolina
- In office April 7, 1802 – December 20, 1857
- Appointed by: Thomas Jefferson
- Preceded by: John Sitgreaves
- Succeeded by: Asa Biggs

Judge of the United States Circuit Court for the Fifth Circuit
- In office May 9, 1801 – April 7, 1802
- Appointed by: Thomas Jefferson
- Preceded by: Seat established by 2 Stat. 89
- Succeeded by: Edward Harris

Personal details
- Born: Henry Potter; January 5, 1766 Mecklenburg County, Colony of Virginia, British America
- Died: December 20, 1857 (aged 91) Fayetteville, North Carolina
- Education: read law

Henry Potter (January 5, 1766 – December 20, 1857) was an American lawyer and jurist who was the longest-serving United States federal judge in United States history. Appointed by President Thomas Jefferson in 1801, he served as a federal judge for 56 years until his death in 1857 at age 91. Potter initially was a judge of the United States Circuit Court for the Fifth Circuit before becoming a United States district judge of the United States District Court for the Albemarle, Cape Fear and Pamptico Districts of North Carolina.

== Education and career ==
Born on January 5, 1766, in Mecklenburg County, Colony of Virginia, British America, Potter read law circa 1790. He engaged in private practice in Raleigh, North Carolina from circa 1792 to 1802.

== Federal judicial service ==
Potter received a recess appointment from President Thomas Jefferson on May 9, 1801, to the United States Circuit Court for the Fifth Circuit, to a new seat authorized by 2 Stat. 89. He was nominated to the same position by President Jefferson on January 6, 1802. He was confirmed by the United States Senate on January 26, 1802, and received his commission the same day. His service terminated on April 7, 1802, due to his appointment to another judicial position.

Potter was nominated by President Jefferson on April 6, 1802, to a seat on the United States District Court for the Albemarle, Cape Fear & Pamptico Districts of North Carolina (also referenced officially as the United States District Court for the District of North Carolina) vacated by Judge John Sitgreaves. He was confirmed by the Senate on April 7, 1802, and received his commission the same day. His service terminated on December 20, 1857, due to his death in Fayetteville, North Carolina.

== Other service ==
Potter became a trustee of the University of North Carolina in 1799, and held that position until his death. He published various books, including an 1816 tract on the Duties of a Justice of the Peace, and, with John Louis Taylor and Bartlett Yancey, an 1821 revision of the two-volume Law of the State of North Carolina.

== Family ==
Potter was born to John Potter and Mary Howard Hawkins. He moved with his parents to Granville County, Province of North Carolina, British America (State of North Carolina, United States from July 4, 1776), where he spent his childhood. Potter married Sylvania Williams in 1799.

== See also ==
- List of United States federal judges by longevity of service

Legal offices
Preceded by Seat established by 2 Stat. 89	Judge of the United States Circuit Court for the Fifth Circuit; 1801–1802	Succeeded by Edward Harris
Preceded by John Sitgreaves	Judge of the United States District Court for the District of North Carolina; 1802–1857	Succeeded by Asa Biggs
