= John Stokes (North Carolina judge) =

American judge (1756–1790)

Judge of the United States District Court for the District of North Carolina
- In office August 3, 1790 – October 12, 1790
- Appointed by: George Washington
- Preceded by: Seat established by 1 Stat. 126
- Succeeded by: John Sitgreaves

Personal details
- Born: March 20, 1756 Colony of Virginia, British America
- Died: October 12, 1790 (aged 34)

John Stokes (March 20, 1756 – October 12, 1790) was a United States district judge of the United States District Court for the District of North Carolina.

== Education and career ==
Born on March 20, 1756, in the Colony of Virginia, British America, Stokes served as a captain in the Continental Army during the American Revolutionary War, from 1778 to 1783. He was a state's attorney for Rowan County, North Carolina in 1784. He was a teacher of law in Rowan County from 1784 to 1785. He was a member of the North Carolina Senate from Montgomery County from 1786 to 1787. He was in private practice in Rowan County starting in 1787. He was a member of the North Carolina House of Commons (now the North Carolina House of Representatives) in 1789. He was a member of the North Carolina convention to ratify the United States Constitution in 1789, which was ultimately ratified by a subsequent convention in 1790.

== Federal judicial service ==
Stokes was nominated by President George Washington on August 2, 1790, to the United States District Court for the District of North Carolina, to a new seat authorized by 1 Stat. 126. He was confirmed by the United States Senate on August 3, 1790, and received his commission the same day. His service terminated on October 12, 1790, due to his death.

== Honor ==
Stokes County, North Carolina is named for Stokes.

== Sources ==
Legal offices
Preceded by Seat established by 1 Stat. 126	Judge of the United States District Court for the District of North Carolina; 1790	Succeeded by John Sitgreaves
