= Thomas Francis Marshall =

American politician

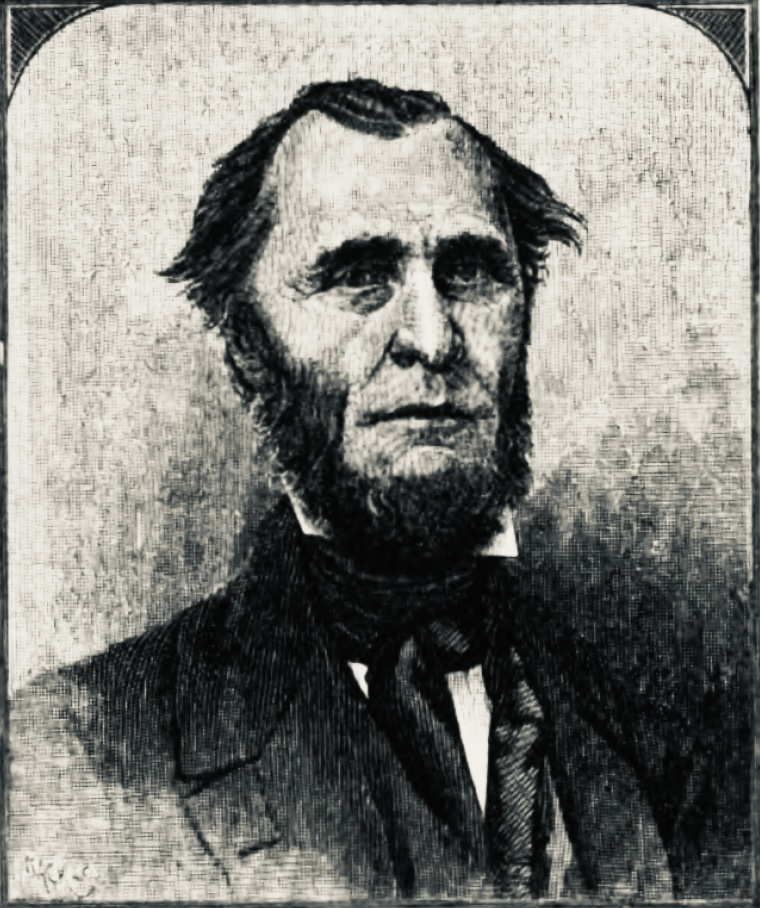

Member of the U.S. House of Representatives from Kentucky's 10th district
- In office March 4, 1841 – March 3, 1843
- Preceded by: Richard Hawes
- Succeeded by: John W. Tibbatts

Member of the Kentucky House of Representatives
- In office 1832

Personal details
- Born: June 7, 1801 Frankfort, Kentucky
- Died: September 22, 1864 (aged 63) Woodford County, Kentucky
- Resting place: Frankfort Cemetery
- Party: Whig
- Relations: John Marshall (Uncle)
- Profession: Lawyer

Military service
- Allegiance: United States of America
- Years of service: 1846–1847
- Rank: Captain
- Battles/wars: Mexican–American War

Thomas Francis Marshall (June 7, 1801 – September 22, 1864) was a politician and lawyer from Kentucky. He was the nephew of John Marshall.

== Early life and family ==
Marshall was born June 7, 1801, in Frankfort, Kentucky. He was a son of Dr. Louis Marshall and the nephew of John Marshall.

Marshall received his early education from his parents. He then studied in Virginia under his uncle, James Marshall. Returning to Kentucky, he studied law under John J. Crittenden. He was admitted to the bar and commenced practice in Versailles, Kentucky, in 1828.

== Political career ==
Marshall attended the convention that drafted the 1830 Constitution of Virginia to observe the debate among the delegates, which included his uncle John Marshall, John Randolph, James Madison, and James Monroe. He befriended Henry Clay and was elected to the Kentucky House of Representatives in 1832. While a member of the House, he distinguished himself by a report denouncing the doctrine of nullification, as proposed by the state of South Carolina to the several states. He moved to Louisville, Kentucky, in 1833 and resumed his legal practice, but his practice was again interrupted by election to the Kentucky House of Representatives, where he served until 1836.

In 1837, Marshall sought election to the U.S. House of Representatives, but was defeated by incumbent William J. Graves. Embarrassed by the loss, he returned to Woodford County and was elected twice more to the state legislature, serving from 1838 to 1839.

In 1841, he was elected a Whig to represent Kentucky's Tenth District in the U.S. House of Representatives. Although he was a frequent orator in that body, only two of his speeches were reported in the local newspapers owing to his admonition to reporters not to "pass on the public their infernal gibberish for my English". After publicly differing with Henry Clay on the issues of renewing the charter of the Second Bank of the United States and the annexation of Texas, he considered it futile to run for re-election in Clay's home district and declined to seek renomination to his seat in Congress.

Marshall campaigned for James K. Polk, Clay's opponent in the 1844 presidential election. In 1845, he was again unsuccessful in his bid for a seat in Congress, losing to Garrett Davis. During the Mexican–American War, he served a captain of cavalry volunteers for a year.

After returning from the war, Marshall unsuccessfully sought to be a delegate to the constitutional convention that drafted the 1850 Kentucky Constitution. He campaigned for Winfield Scott in the 1852 presidential election and was again elected to the Kentucky House of Representatives in 1854. He served a single term, which marked his last service in public office.

== Later life and death ==
In 1856, Marshall moved to Chicago, Illinois. He later returned to Kentucky and continued to practice law. He devoted the latter years of his life to the study of geology and history, and lectured in the northern and eastern United States. A collection of his writings and speeches was edited by W. L. Barre (Cincinnati, 1858). He died near Versailles, Kentucky, on September 22, 1864, and was interred in Frankfort Cemetery in Frankfort, Kentucky.

U.S. House of Representatives
| Preceded by Richard Hawes | Member of the U.S. House of Representatives from Kentucky's 10th congressional district March 4, 1841 – March 3, 1843 (obsolete district) | Succeeded by John W. Tibbatts |
