= List of federal judges appointed by Thomas Jefferson =

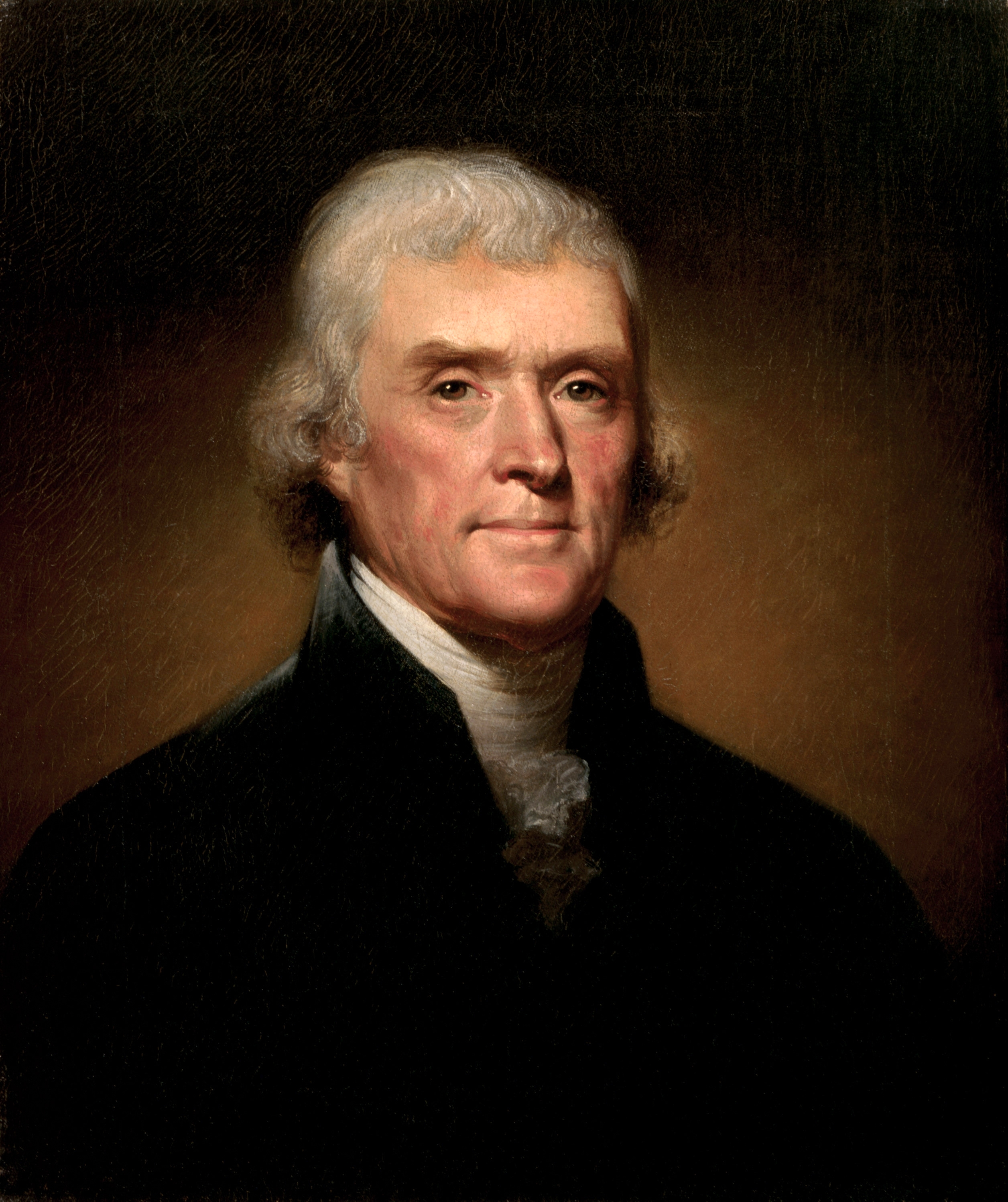
Thomas Jefferson.

Following is a list of all Article III United States federal judges appointed by President Thomas Jefferson during his presidency. In total Jefferson appointed 19 Article III federal judges, including 3 Justices to the Supreme Court of the United States, 7 judges to the United States circuit courts, and 9 judges to the United States district courts. Three of Jefferson's circuit court appointments were to seats that had been created by the Midnight Judges Act, signed by John Adams to allow the appointment of many of his supporters in the closing days of his administration. The service of these judges, including those appointed by Jefferson, terminated on July 1, 1802, due to the repeal of the Act and the accompanying abolition of the court.

Two of Jefferson's appointees, William Cranch (whom Jefferson elevated to Chief Judge of the Circuit Court of the District of Columbia) and Henry Potter (appointed first to the Fifth Circuit, and then to the District of North Carolina) served into the 1850s. Potter's 55 years on the latter court remains the longest period of active service in United States federal court history.

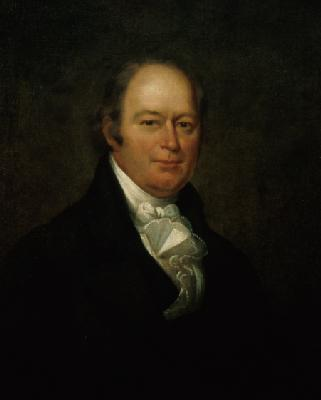
William Johnson was Jefferson's longest serving Supreme Court appointee, and had a fiercely independent judicial philosophy.

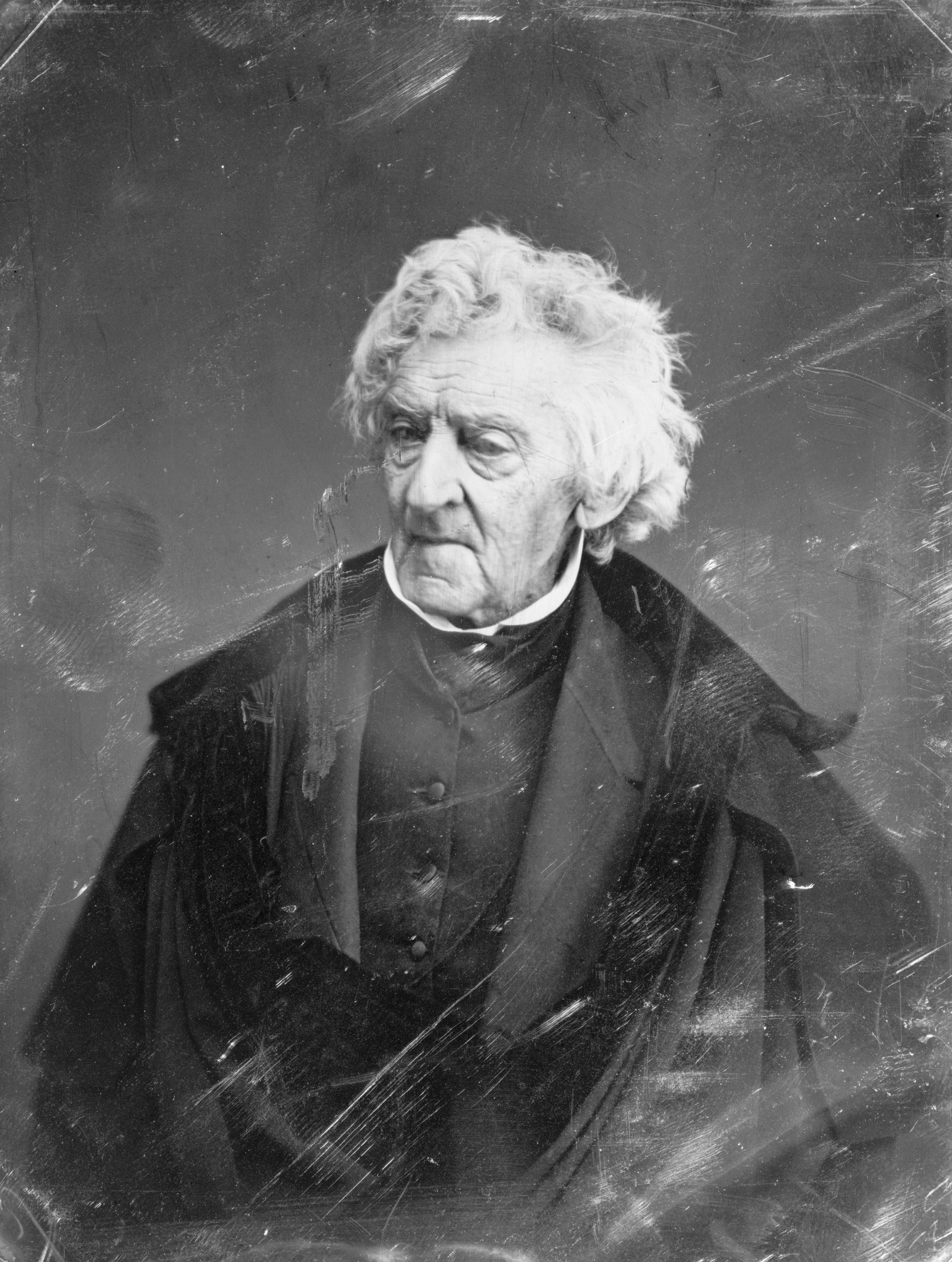
William Cranch, initially appointed to the District of Columbia Circuit by John Adams, was elevated by Thomas Jefferson to be Chief Judge of that court, and became one of the longest-serving federal judges in U.S. history.

== United States Supreme Court justices ==
#	Justice	Seat	State	Former justice	Nomination date	Confirmation date	Began active service	Ended active service
1	William Johnson	5	South Carolina	Alfred Moore	March 22, 1804	March 24, 1804	March 26, 1804	August 4, 1834
2	Henry Brockholst Livingston	1	New York	William Paterson	December 13, 1806	December 17, 1806	November 10, 1806	March 18, 1823
3	Thomas Todd	6	Virginia	Seat established	February 28, 1807	March 2, 1807	March 3, 1807	February 7, 1826

== Circuit courts ==
#	Judge	Circuit	Nomination date	Confirmation date	Began active service	Ended active service
1	William Kilty	D.C.	January 6, 1802	January 26, 1802	March 23, 1801	January 27, 1806
2	Henry Potter	Fifth	January 6, 1802	January 26, 1802	May 9, 1801	April 7, 1802
3	Dominic Augustin Hall	Fifth	January 6, 1802	January 26, 1802	July 1, 1801	July 1, 1802
4	Edward Harris	Fifth	April 27, 1802	April 29, 1802	May 3, 1802	July 1, 1802
5	Nicholas Battalle Fitzhugh	D.C.	November 21, 1803	November 25, 1803	November 25, 1803	December 31, 1814
6	William Cranch	D.C.	February 21, 1806	February 24, 1806	February 24, 1806	September 1, 1855
7	Allen Bowie Duckett	D.C.	February 28, 1806	March 3, 1806	March 17, 1806	July 19, 1809

== District courts ==
#	Judge	Court (Note: See List of United States district and territorial courts)	Nomination date	Confirmation date	Began active service	Ended active service
1	David L. Barnes	D.R.I.	January 6, 1802	January 26, 1802	April 30, 1801	November 3, 1812
2	William Stephens	D. Ga.	January 6, 1802	January 26, 1802	October 22, 1801	October 13, 1818
3	Henry Potter	D.N.C.	April 6, 1802	April 7, 1802	April 7, 1802	December 20, 1857
4	Charles Willing Byrd	D. Ohio	March 1, 1803	March 3, 1803	March 3, 1803	August 25, 1828
5	John Samuel Sherburne	D.N.H.	March 22, 1804	March 24, 1804	March 26, 1804	August 2, 1830
6	Dominic Augustin Hall	D. Orleans	November 30, 1804	November 30, 1804	December 11, 1804	April 30, 1812
7	Matthias B. Tallmadge	D.N.Y.	December 20, 1805	December 23, 1805	June 12, 1805	July 1, 1819
8	Pierpont Edwards	D. Conn.	February 21, 1806	February 24, 1806	February 24, 1806	April 5, 1826
9	James Houston	D. Md.	April 19, 1806	April 21, 1806	April 21, 1806	June 8, 1819

== See also ==
- Marbury v. Madison (1803)
- Stuart v. Laird (1803)
- United States v. More (1805)

== Sources ==
- Federal Judicial Center
