= Nicholas Battaile Fitzhugh =

American politician (1764–1814)

Judge Nicholas Battaile Fitzhugh

Judge of the United States Circuit Court of the District of Columbia
- In office November 25, 1803 – December 31, 1814
- Appointed by: Thomas Jefferson
- Preceded by: James Markham Marshall
- Succeeded by: James Sewall Morsell

Member of the Virginia House of Delegates representing Fairfax County
- In office December 1, 1800 – November 24, 1803 Serving with Thomas Swann, Henry Rose, John West
- Preceded by: Richard Bland Lee
- Succeeded by: George Summers
- In office October 18, 1790 – June 22, 1788 Serving with Ludwell Lee, Roger West
- Preceded by: Roger West
- Succeeded by: Charles Simms

Personal details
- Born: Nicholas Battaile Fitzhugh; May 10, 1764 King George County, Colony of Virginia, British America
- Died: December 31, 1814 (aged 50) Washington, D.C., U.S.
- Cause of death: Christ Church; Alexandria, Virginia, U.S.
- Spouse: Sarah Washington Ashton (m. 1788)
- Children: 10

Nicholas Battaile Fitzhugh (May 10, 1764 – December 31, 1814) was a Virginia lawyer and politician who became a United States circuit judge of the United States Circuit Court of the District of Columbia after representing Fairfax County in the Virginia House of Delegates.

== Early and family life ==
Nicholas Fitzhugh was the eldest son born to Sarah Battaile, who in 1746 married Col. Henry Fitzhugh of "Bedford" (1723–1783), in King George County, Colony of Virginia, British America. His ancestor, William Fitzhugh, in 1694 received an enormous 21,966 acres holding from the proprietors of the Northern Neck of Virginia, in what became vast Stafford County, Virginia, and later became several counties, including Fairfax County (formed in 1742). His grandfather, also Henry Fitzhugh, had represented then-vast Stafford County, Virginia in the House of Burgesses several times before his death in 1743. Several more distant relatives named William Fitzhugh also served in the Virginia General Assembly, including his cousin William Fitzhugh who served in the Continental Congress. When Nicholas was a child (and during his education by tutors as appropriate to his class), his father commissioned John Hesselius to paint a portrait of his wife; the portrait is now at the Virginia Museum of History and Culture. Henry Fitzhugh of Bedford owned several plantations in Fairfax County, Virginia, totaling about 12,585 acres, which he mostly leased to tenants in his lifetime, and in his will divided among his sons Nicholas, Richard, Mordecai, Battaile and Giles.

== Career ==
in 1783, Fitzhugh built Ossian Hall on the plantation he owned near what became Annandale in Fairfax County. While his family had owned the large Ravensworth tract for years, it had leased the land to tenants; this was the first mansion located on that particular tract, and his cousin William Henry Fitzhugh would build a mansion called Ravensworth on his adjacent parcel (which he had inherited from his father). After admission to the Virginia bar in 1790, Nicholas Fitzhugh had a private legal practice in Fairfax County. Fairfax County voters first elected him as one of their representatives in the Virginia House of Delegates in 1790. He was elected and re-elected several times, as well as failed several times. Thus he served from 1791 to 1802, then from 1802 to 1803. In 1804, following his federal judicial appointment, Fitzhugh sold Ossian Hall to David Stuart, who had also represented Fairfax County in the Virginia House of Delegates, and was also known as a friend of the late President George Washington as well as husband of his stepson's widow and who helped raise John Parke Custis' children.

== Federal judicial service ==
On November 21, 1803, President Thomas Jefferson nominated Fitzhugh to a seat on the United States Circuit Court of the District of Columbia vacated by Judge James Markham Marshall. The United States Senate confirmed Fitzhugh on November 25, 1803, and he received his commission the same day, serving thereafter until his death on December 31, 1814, in Fairfax, Virginia.

== Personal life and death ==
In 1788 Nicholas Fitzhugh married Sarah Washington Ashton, daughter of Burdette Ashton of King George County. The couple had six sons and four daughters, including Henry William Fitzhugh (b.1792, who moved to Rappahannock County, Virginia), Augustine Fitzhugh of "Milbank", Dr. Edmund Fitzhugh and Charles Fitzhugh (both of whom moved to Tennessee), Laurence Fitzhugh (1802–1855, who moved to Clinton County, Ohio), Burdette, Henrietta (1789–1879, who married her cousin Henry Fitzhugh of "Bunker Hill" and moved to what became West Virginia to establish the town of Ravenswood on land inherited from her great-granduncle George Washington), Lucy (d. 1852 in Fauquier County), Mary (1805–1842, who married Arthur A.M. Payne, moved to Fauquier County), Sophia (who married Mr. White and moved to Kentucky). Fitzhugh owned 38 slaves in Fairfax County in 1810.

Judge Fitzhugh died in the Washington, D.C., on New Year's Eve, 1814, survived by his widow and children. He is buried in the cemetery of historic Christ Church in Alexandria, Virginia. While some of his descendants owned slaves and fought for the Confederacy, including grandsons CSA Brig. General William H. F. Payne and Major Nicholas Fitzhugh (1823–1892; of the 22nd Virginia Infantry and later a cavalry unit), another grandson, U.S. Naval Academy graduate Cmdr. William E. Fitzhugh (1832–1889), captured the Confederate ironclad Missouri in June 1865.

Legal offices
Preceded by James Markham Marshall	Judge of the United States Circuit Court of the District of Columbia; 1803–1814	Succeeded by James Sewall Morsell
