= Joseph T. Threston =

American Navy systems engineer (1935–2026)

Joseph Thomas Threston (September 20, 1935 – March 4, 2026) was an American Navy systems engineer, known for his contributions to the development of the Aegis Combat System.

Threston started his career in 1959 at Hughes Aircraft Company in the Guided Missile Laboratory, as entry-level engineer he participated in the further development and production of the Falcon Missile system, that the United States Air Force used since 1956. In the 1960s, he joined RCA Corporation, where he made significant contributions to the development of the Aegis Combat System. After RCA was acquired by General Electric in 1986, Threston became General Manager of the Naval Systems Department. His department was part of GE Aerospace businesses, which was sold to Martin Marietta in 1992, and became part of Lockheed Martin in 1995. From General manager and president of manufacturing, Threston became company president.

He received several awards and honors. In 1991, he received the Harold E. Saunders Award from the American Society of Naval Engineers; and in 1995 he received the IEEE Simon Ramo Medal for his "leadership of the design, development and production of the AEGIS ship combat system."

Threston died on March 4, 2026, at the age of 90.

== Selected publications ==
- Threston, Joseph Thomas. "Enhanced carrier operations through use of an/spy-1 radar system." Naval Engineers Journal 89.1 (1977): 31–38.
- Threston, Joe. "Managing the Future—The expanding role of systems engineering in a high-technology society," JCVI Engineer. Vol. 28. No. 4 (July August 1983)
- Threston, Joseph T. "The American Society of Naval Engineers takes great pleasure in presenting: The Harold E. Saunders Award for 1991." Naval Engineers Journal 104.4 (1992): 70–71.
- Threston, Joseph T. "The AEGIS Weapon System." Naval Engineers Journal 121.3 (2009): 85–108.
