= Thruxton =

Thruxton could be:

== Places ==
- Thruxton, Hampshire
- Thruxton, Herefordshire

== Other ==
- Thruxton Circuit, a racetrack in Hampshire
- Triumph Thruxton 900, a motorcycle
- Velocette Thruxton, a motorcycle
