= John Sitgreaves =

American judge

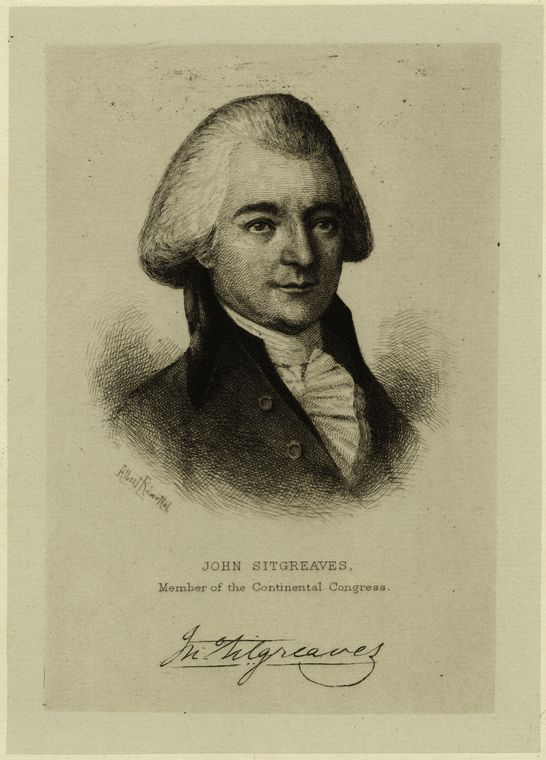

Judge of the United States District Court for the Albemarle, Cape Fear & Pamptico Districts of North Carolina
- In office February 13, 1801 – March 4, 1802
- Appointed by: operation of law
- Preceded by: Seat established by 2 Stat. 89
- Succeeded by: Henry Potter

Judge of the United States District Court for the Edenton, New Bern & Wilmington Districts of North Carolina
- In office June 9, 1794 – March 3, 1797
- Appointed by: operation of law
- Preceded by: Seat established by 1 Stat. 395
- Succeeded by: Seat abolished

Judge of the United States District Court for the District of North Carolina
- In office March 3, 1797 – February 13, 1801
- Appointed by: operation of law
- Preceded by: Seat established by 1 Stat. 517
- Succeeded by: Seat abolished
- In office December 20, 1790 – June 9, 1794
- Appointed by: George Washington
- Preceded by: John Stokes
- Succeeded by: Seat abolished

Personal details
- Born: 1757 England
- Died: March 4, 1802 (aged 44–45) Halifax, North Carolina
- Resting place: Colonial Churchyard; Halifax, North Carolina
- Education: Eton College read law

John Sitgreaves (1757 – March 4, 1802) was a delegate to the Congress of the Confederation, a United States Attorney for the District of North Carolina and a United States district judge of the United States District Court for the District of North Carolina, the United States District Court for the Edenton, New Bern & Wilmington Districts of North Carolina and the United States District Court for the Albemarle, Cape Fear & Pamptico Districts of North Carolina.

== Education and career ==
Born in 1757, in England, Sitgreaves attended Eton College in England and read law. He entered private practice in New Bern, North Carolina, Province of North Carolina, British America (State of North Carolina, United States from July 4, 1776). He served in the Continental Army as a lieutenant during the American Revolutionary War, serving as a military aide to General William Caswell. He was clerk for the North Carolina Senate from 1777 to 1779. He was a member of the Board of Auditors for Public and Private Accounts in 1779. He was a commissioner for the sale of confiscated properties in New Bern in 1780. He was a member of the North Carolina House of Commons (now the North Carolina House of Representatives) in 1784, and from 1786 to 1788, serving as Speaker from 1787 to 1788. He was a delegate to the Congress of the Confederation (Continental Congress) from 1784 to 1785. He was a member of the North Carolina convention to ratify the United States Constitution. He was the United States Attorney for the District of North Carolina from 1789 to 1790.

== Federal judicial service ==
Sitgreaves was nominated by President George Washington on December 17, 1790, to a seat on the United States District Court for the District of North Carolina vacated by Judge John Stokes. He was confirmed by the United States Senate on December 20, 1790, and received his commission the same day. Sitgreaves was reassigned by operation of law to the United States District Court for the Edenton, New Bern & Wilmington Districts of North Carolina (also referenced officially as the United States District Court for the District of North Carolina) on June 9, 1794, to a new seat authorized by 1 Stat. 395. Sitgreaves was reassigned by operation of law to the United States District Court for the District of North Carolina on March 3, 1797, to a new seat authorized by 1 Stat. 517. Sitgreaves was reassigned by operation of law to the United States District Court for the Albemarle, Cape Fear & Pamptico Districts of North Carolina (also referenced officially as the United States District Court for the District of North Carolina) on February 13, 1801, to a new seat authorized by 2 Stat. 89. His service terminated on March 4, 1802, due to his death in Halifax, North Carolina. He was interred in Colonial Churchyard in Halifax.

Sitgreaves was nominated to the United States Circuit Court for the Fifth Circuit on February 21, 1801, and was confirmed by the Senate on February 24, 1801, but he declined the appointment.

== Sources ==
- United States Congress. "John Sitgreaves (id: S000459)". Biographical Directory of the United States Congress.
- John Sitgreaves at the Biographical Directory of Federal Judges, a publication of the Federal Judicial Center.

Legal offices
Preceded by John Stokes	Judge of the United States District Court for the District of North Carolina; 1790–1794	Succeeded by Seat abolished
Preceded by Seat established by 1 Stat. 395	Judge of the United States District Court for the District of North Carolina (as Edenton, New Bern & Wilmington Districts); 1794–1797	Succeeded by Seat abolished
Preceded by Seat established by 1 Stat. 517	Judge of the United States District Court for the District of North Carolina; 1797–1801	Succeeded by Seat abolished
Preceded by Seat established by 2 Stat. 89	Judge of the United States District Court for the District of North Carolina (as Albemarle, Cape Fear & Pamptico Districts); 1801–1802	Succeeded by Henry Potter
