= Allen Bowie Duckett =

American politician (1775–1809)

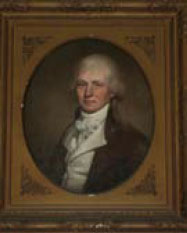

Judge of the United States Circuit Court of the District of Columbia
- In office March 17, 1806 – July 19, 1809
- Appointed by: Thomas Jefferson
- Preceded by: William Cranch
- Succeeded by: Buckner Thruston

Personal details
- Born: Allen Bowie Duckett; 1775 Prince George's County, Province of Maryland, British America
- Died: July 19, 1809 (aged 33–34) Prince George's County, Maryland
- Education: Princeton University read law

Allen Bowie Duckett (1775 – July 19, 1809) was a United States circuit judge of the United States Circuit Court of the District of Columbia.

== Education and career ==
Born in 1775, in Prince George's County, Province of Maryland, British America, Duckett graduated from the College of New Jersey (now Princeton University) in 1790 and read law. He entered private practice in Prince George's County, Maryland. He was an assistant clerk for the Maryland House of Delegates from 1793 to 1795. He was a member of the Maryland House of Delegates from 1796 to 1800. He was a member of the Executive Council of the State of Maryland from 1801 to 1806.

== Federal judicial service ==
Duckett was nominated by President Thomas Jefferson on February 28, 1806, to a seat on the United States Circuit Court for the District of Columbia vacated by Judge William Cranch. He was confirmed by the United States Senate on March 3, 1806, and received his commission on March 17, 1806. His service terminated on July 19, 1809, due to his death in Prince George's County.

== Sources ==
Legal offices
Preceded by William Cranch	Judge of the United States Circuit Court of the District of Columbia; 1806–1809	Succeeded by Buckner Thruston
