= John Cranch (American painter) =

American painter (1807–1891)

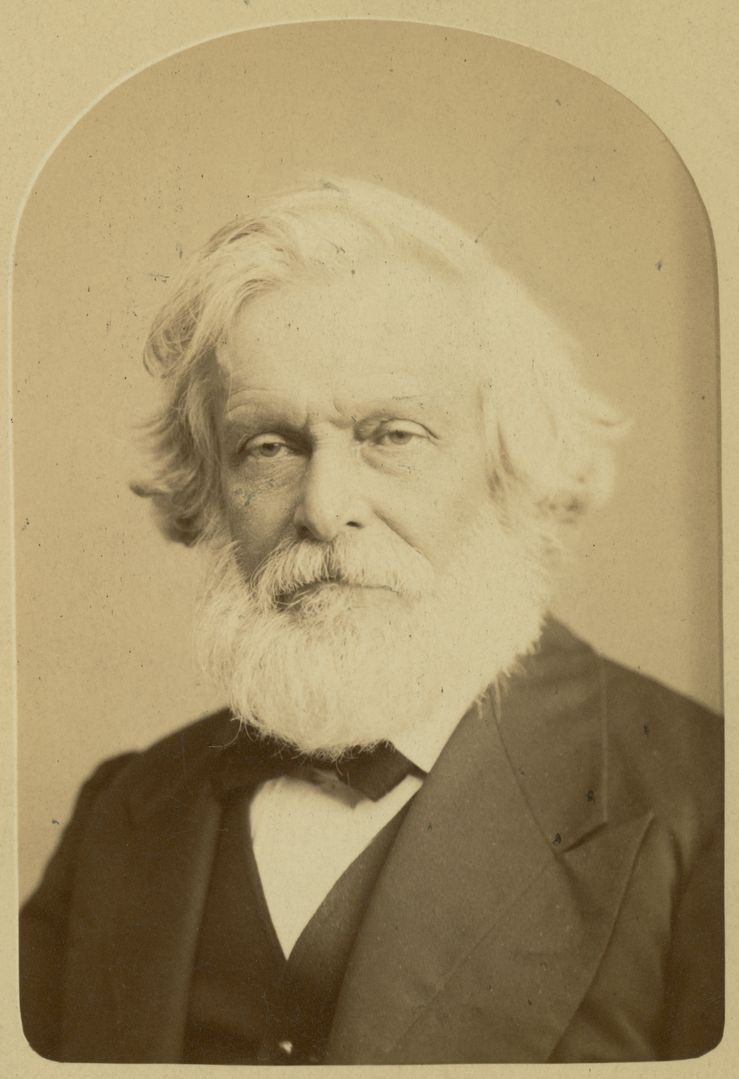
Portrait of Cranch by photographer W. M. De Voe, Urbana, Ohio

John Cranch (February 2, 1807 – January 12, 1891) was an American painter and print collector.

Cranch was born in Washington, D.C., the third son of judge William Cranch; his younger brother was the poet and painter Christopher Pearse Cranch, and his elder brother Edward was also an artist. Like Christopher, he was a graduate of Columbian College; at his commencement in 1826 he read a poem of his own composition, "Painting", suggesting that he had already determined on his future career. William Dunlap claimed that he studied with Chester Harding, Charles Bird King, and Thomas Sully, though he provided no details; this would be unsurprising, however, as all three artists had been active in Washington before 1829, in which year Cranch first advertised his services as a portraitist.

Cranch traveled to Italy in 1830, bearing a letter of introduction from John Quincy Adams, a cousin, to Charles R. Leslie. He spent four years there, mainly in Florence and Venice, becoming friends with Hiram Powers and associating with visiting Americans, such as Ralph Waldo Emerson. He studied the work of the Old Masters and continued to paint, creating portraits, genre scenes, and depictions of scenes from Shakespeare. Traveling companions during his time in Italy included Henry and Horatio Greenough and Thomas Cole; other friends from his career included Charles Lanman and John Mix Stanley. Cranch returned to the United States in 1834 and settled in New York City, but did not show in an annual exhibition of the National Academy of Design until 1838. In 1839 he became a Swedenborgian. That year he showed three works in the annual exhibition; these were a portrait of a child, a study of an old man "painted at Rome", and The Valley of the Shadow of Death. This last, based on the 23rd Psalm and meant as an inspirational work, received scant notice, and the one reviewer that did pay it mind wrote derisively of its composition.

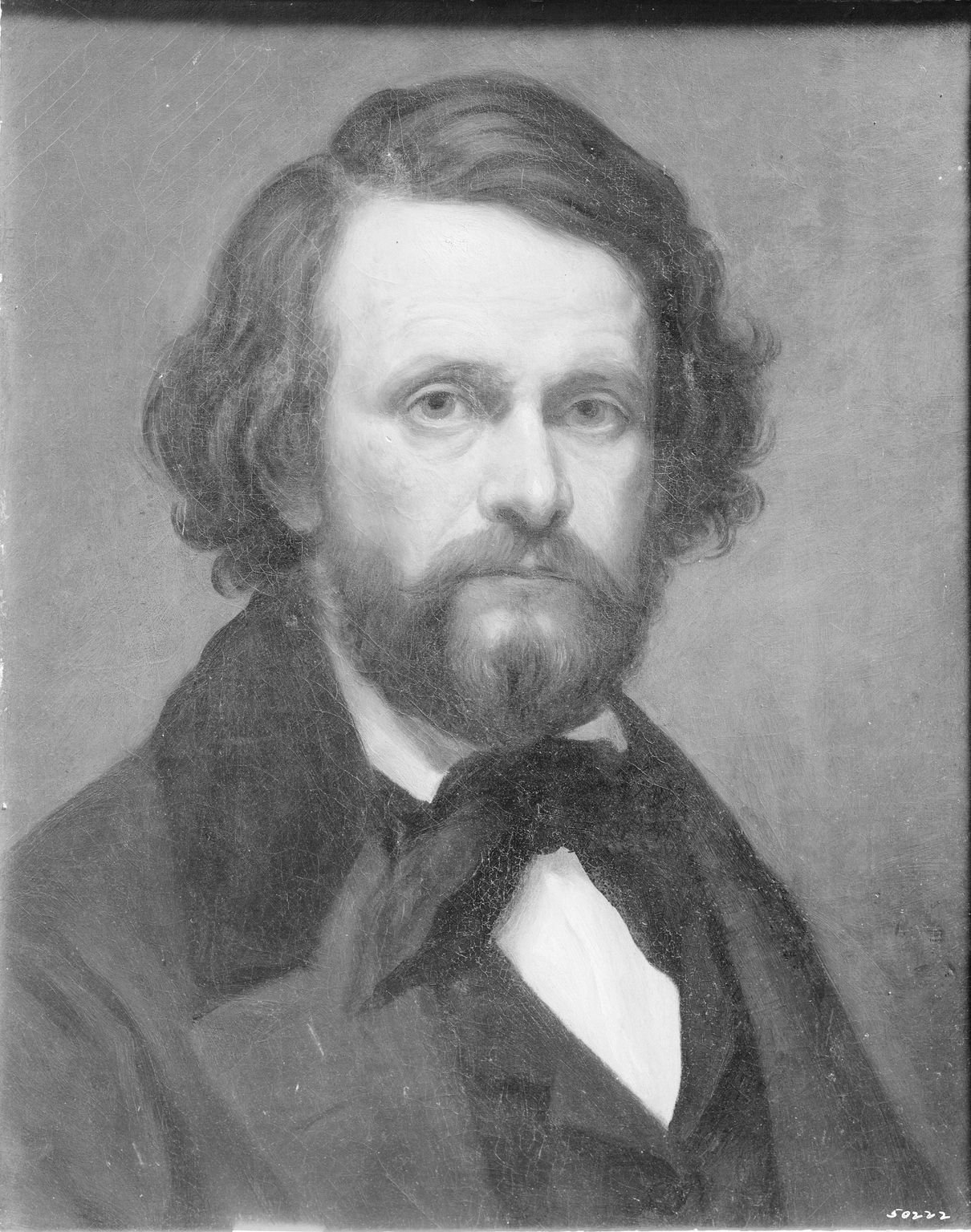
Self-portrait, c. 1864 (National Academy of Design, New York)

After apparently working in North Carolina briefly, Cranch traveled to Cincinnati in the autumn of 1839, and soon became active in the local art community; he served as president of the Fine Arts Section of the Hamilton County Society for the Diffusion of Useful Knowledge, at whose exhibition in 1842 he showed a portrait of Charles Dickens, then visiting the United States. He married Charlotte Davis Appleton in 1845 and moved to Boston; in 1846 he exhibited at the Boston Athenaeum. At this point in his career he spent some time in Washington again, where he shared studio space with George Caleb Bingham. He returned to New York in 1848, and kept a studio in the New York University Building from 1849 to 1852. The following year he began sharing a space at 806 Broadway with his brother Christopher, remaining there until 1854; he exhibited at the National Academy during both of the years in question, and was named an associate in 1853. Nevertheless, he moved again, back to Washington, in 1855. There he soon became involved with the Washington Art Association, then newly formed, for which organization he served as director and, later, corresponding secretary. He was also active, along with William Wilson Corcoran and George Peter Alexander Healy, in attempts to set up a national gallery and school of art in Washington. In 1858 he exhibited with the National Academy one last time, again The Valley of the Shadow of Death; that was also the last year in which the Washington city directory showed him as an artist, as from then until he left the city he was listed as "postal clerk" in the rolls. He left Washington in 1878 and disappears from the record until 1885, when he is listed as a portraitist in Urbana, Ohio, where his son-in-law was serving as president of Urbana University. He died in Urbana, and was memorialized by the Academy on January 12, 1891. He is buried at Oakdale Cemetery in Urbana.

A self-portrait by Cranch is today in the collection of the National Academy. His papers, including a journal copied by his wife Charlotte from his original, are currently in the Archives of American Art. At his death, she donated many of his prints to the Academy, while engravings he owned of Renaissance art were presented to the Smithsonian Institution and are today part of the graphic arts collection of the National Museum of American History. Several of his drawings are owned by the Metropolitan Museum of Art. A portrait of his father hangs in the Ceremonial Courtroom of the E. Barrett Prettyman United States Courthouse in Washington. An 1830 portrait of John Quincy Adams was destroyed in the 1851 fire at the Library of Congress; he painted Adams on three other occasions as well.
