= Stettinius (surname) =

Stettinius is a surname. Notable people with the surname include:

- Edward Stettinius Jr. (1900–1949), American businessman and diplomat, son of Edward
- Edward R. Stettinius (1865–1925), American businessman
- Suzanne Stettinius (born 1988), American modern pentathlete
