= Christopher Pearse Cranch =

American writer and artist (1813–1892)

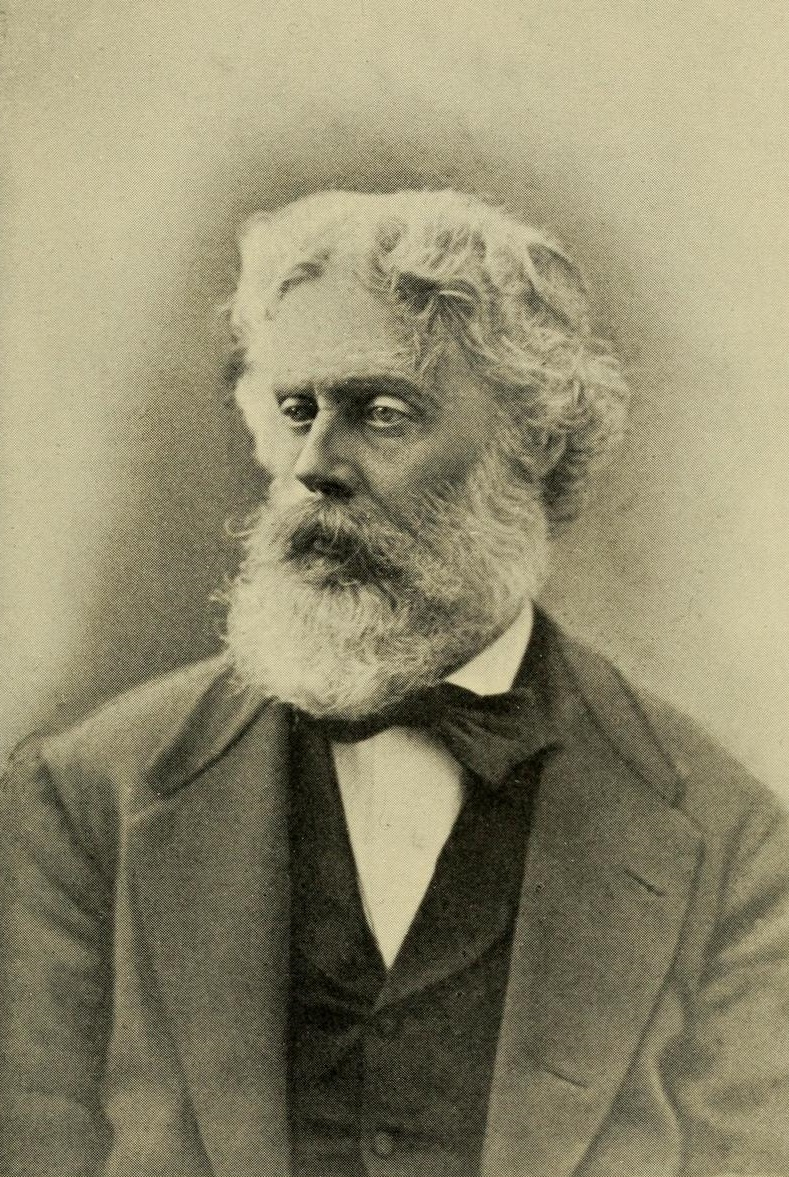
- Born: March 8, 1813; District of Columbia
- Died: January 20, 1892 (aged 78); Cambridge, Massachusetts
- Education: George Washington University; Harvard Divinity School
- Occupations: Writer, artist, editor, minister
- Spouse: Elizabeth DeWindt
- Relatives: William Cranch (father)

Christopher Pearse Cranch (March 8, 1813 – January 20, 1892) was an American writer and artist often associated with Transcendentalism and the Hudson River School.

== Biography ==
Cranch was born March 8, 1813, in Alexandria, Virginia. His conservative father, William Cranch, was Chief Judge of the United States Circuit Court of the District of Columbia. Cranch was the youngest of 13 siblings, including his brother John who would go on to become a painter.

He graduated from Columbian College (now George Washington University) in 1835 before attending Harvard Divinity School and becoming a licensed preacher. During his years at Harvard, he came in contact with people like John Sullivan Dwight and Theodore Parker, through whom he was introduced to Unitarianism. He traveled as a Unitarian minister, preaching in Providence, Andover, Richmond, Bangor, Portland, Boston, Washington, and St. Louis. Later, he pursued various occupations: a magazine editor, caricaturist, children's fantasy writer (the Huggermugger books), poet (The Bird and the Bell with Other Poems in 1875), translator, and landscape painter. He married Elizabeth DeWindt in 1843. His daughter, Caroline Cranch, was a painter.

Though not one of its founding members, Cranch became associated with the Transcendental Club; he read Ralph Waldo Emerson's Nature by December 1836 and beginning in June 1837 served as a substitute editor of the Western Messenger in the absence of James Freeman Clarke. For that journal, Cranch reviewed Emerson's Phi Beta Kappa address at Harvard in August 1837 known as "The American Scholar". He referred to the speech as "so full of beauties, full of original thought and illustration" and its author as "the man of genius, the bold deep thinker, and the concise original writer". Cranch's connection with the Transcendentalists ultimately diminished his demand as a minister. He soon became disillusioned with his harsh experiences in the west and returned to Boston in 1839.

His poetry was published in The Harbinger and The Dial among other publications. He sent "Enosis", which Hazen Carpenter noted as perhaps Cranch's most well-known poem, to Emerson for The Dial on March 2, 1840.

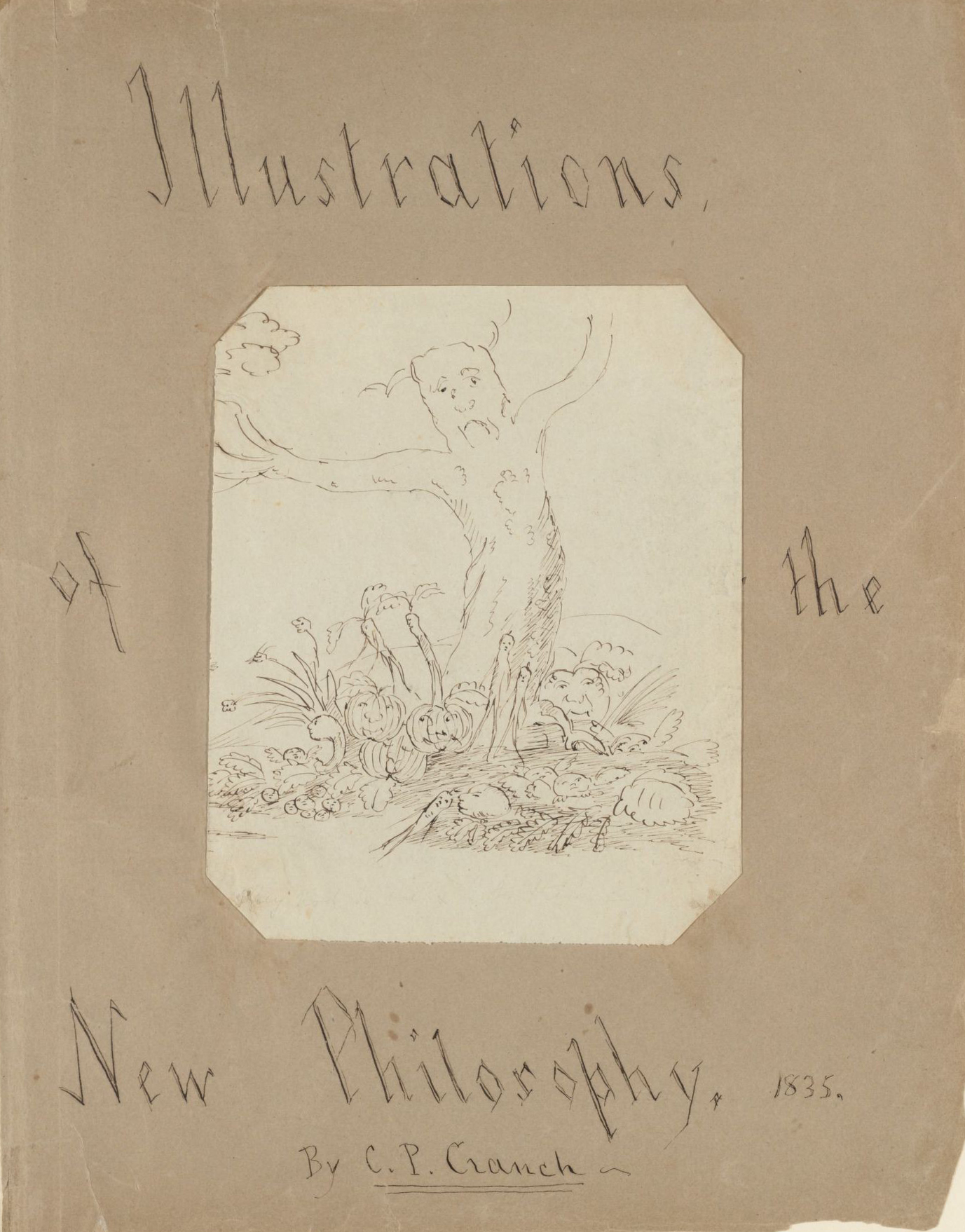
Illustrations of the New Philosophy, c. 1844

Cranch left the ministry to focus on a career in the arts and spent about 20 years in Italy and France studying and practicing painting. As an artist, Cranch painted landscapes similar to the work of Thomas Cole, the Hudson River School, and the Barbizon school in France. In one foray into historical painting, Cranch depicted the burning of P. T. Barnum's American Museum in New York City. Later in life, Cranch painted scenes from Venice and Italy. Cranch's caricatures of Emerson were later bound as Illustrations of the New Philosophy: Guide. Perhaps his most well-remembered and recognized artwork is a hand-drawn caricature illustrating Emerson's concept of the "transparent eyeball". In 1850, he was elected into the National Academy of Design as an Associate Academician, and became a full Academician in 1864.

In 1863, Cranch returned to the United States with his family, including his wife Elizabeth De Windt. Their son George enlisted in the Union Army during the Civil War and was killed shortly thereafter. Cranch spent the last couple decades of his life in Cambridge, Massachusetts, and contributed to publications like Harper's, The Atlantic, Putnam's, and Lippincott's as well as publishing three books of poetry. He died at his home in Cambridge on January 20, 1892, and was buried at Mount Auburn Cemetery in Massachusetts.

== Works ==
- Poems (1844)
- The Last of the Huggermuggers, A Giant Story (1855)
- Kobboltozo, A Sequel to the Last of the Huggermuggers (1857)
- The Aeneid of Virgil (translation, 1872)
- Satan: A Libretto (1874)
- The Bird and the Bell with Other Poems (1875)
- Ariel and Caliban with Other Poems (1887)
