= James Sewall Morsell =

American judge

Judge of the United States Circuit Court of the District of Columbia
- In office January 11, 1815 – March 3, 1863
- Appointed by: James Madison
- Preceded by: Nicholas Battalle Fitzhugh
- Succeeded by: Seat abolished

Personal details
- Born: James Sewall Morsell; January 10, 1775 Calvert County, Province of Maryland, British America
- Died: January 11, 1870 (aged 95) Prince George's County, Maryland

James Sewall Morsell (January 10, 1775 – January 11, 1870) was a United States circuit judge of the United States Circuit Court of the District of Columbia.

== Education and career ==
Born on January 10, 1775, in Calvert County, Province of Maryland, British America, Morsell was in private practice in Georgetown, D.C. until 1815. He served in the United States Army from 1813 to 1814, during the War of 1812.

=== Notable clients ===
Morsell represented a number of African American families who petitioned for their freedom before the United States Circuit Court of the District of Columbia.

== Federal judicial service ==
Morsell was nominated by President James Madison on January 7, 1815, to a seat on the United States Circuit Court of the District of Columbia vacated by Judge Nicholas Battalle Fitzhugh. He was confirmed by the United States Senate on January 11, 1815, and received his commission the same day. His service terminated on March 3, 1863, due to abolition of the court.

== Death ==
Morsell died on January 11, 1870, in Prince George's County, Maryland.

== See also ==
- List of United States federal judges by longevity of service

Legal offices
Preceded by Nicholas Battalle Fitzhugh	Judge of the United States Circuit Court of the District of Columbia; 1815–1863	Succeeded by Seat abolished
