= William Cranch =

American judge (1769–1855)

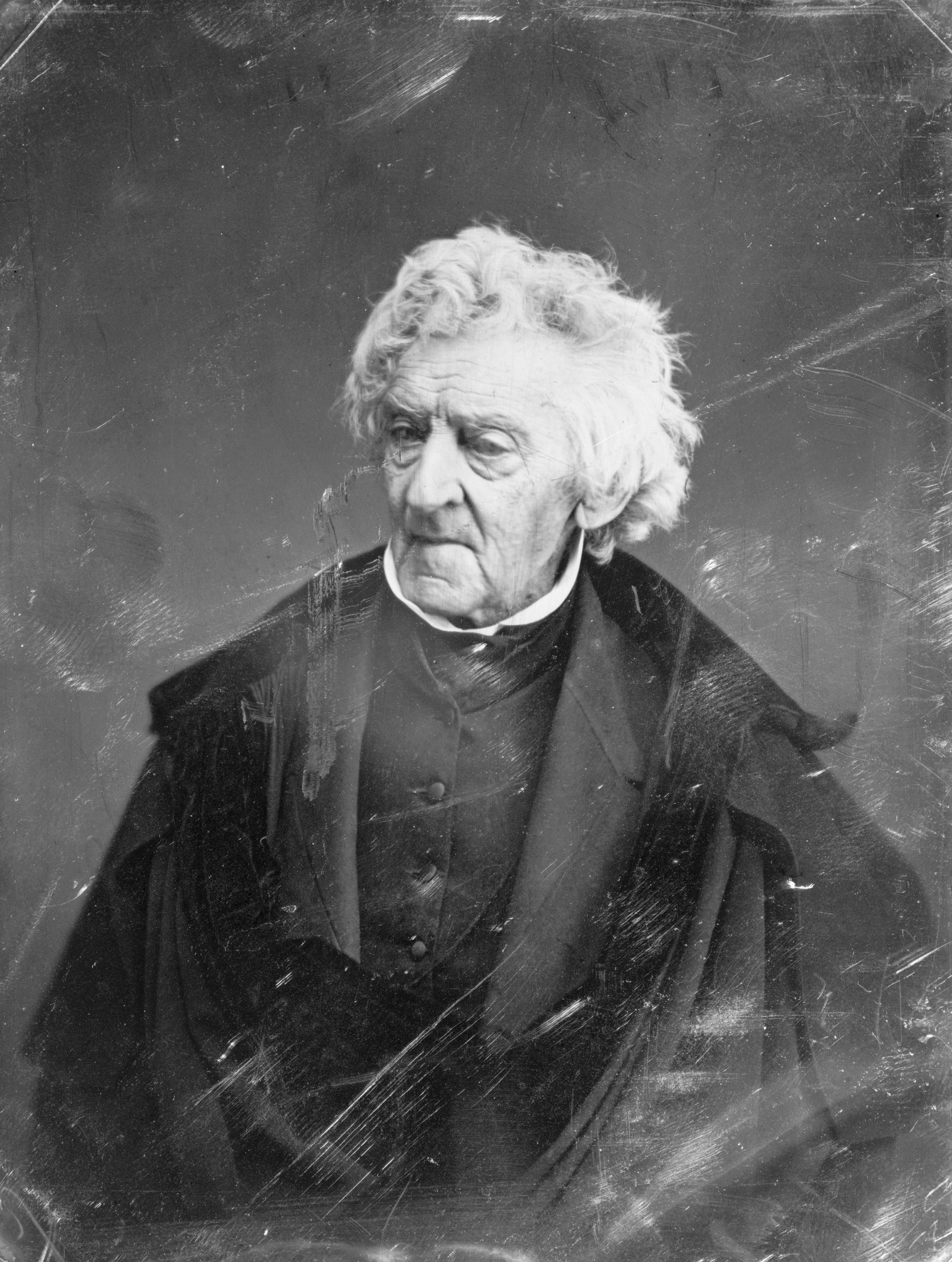

Chief Judge of the United States Circuit Court of the District of Columbia
- In office February 24, 1806 – September 1, 1855
- Appointed by: Thomas Jefferson
- Preceded by: William Kilty
- Succeeded by: James Dunlop

Judge of the United States Circuit Court of the District of Columbia
- In office March 3, 1801 – February 24, 1806
- Appointed by: John Adams
- Preceded by: Seat established by 2 Stat. 103
- Succeeded by: Allen Bowie Duckett

2nd Reporter of Decisions of the Supreme Court of the United States
- In office 1801–1815
- Preceded by: Alexander J. Dallas
- Succeeded by: Henry Wheaton

7th Commissioner of the Federal City
- In office January 14, 1801 – March 3, 1801
- Preceded by: Gustavus Scott
- Succeeded by: Tristram Dalton

Personal details
- Born: July 17, 1769 Weymouth, Province of Massachusetts Bay, British America
- Died: September 1, 1855 (aged 86) Washington, D.C.
- Resting place: Congressional Cemetery; Washington, D.C.
- Party: Federalist
- Spouse: Nancy Greenleaf (m. 1795)
- Children: 13 (including Christopher Pearse Cranch and John Cranch)
- Parent(s): Richard Cranch; Mary Smith
- Relatives: Quincy political family
- Education: Harvard University

William Cranch (July 17, 1769 – September 1, 1855) was a United States circuit judge and chief judge of the United States Circuit Court of the District of Columbia. A staunch Federalist and nephew of First Lady Abigail Adams, Cranch moved his legal practice from Massachusetts to the new national capital, where he became one of three city land commissioners for Washington, D.C., and during his judicial service also was the 2nd Reporter of Decisions of the Supreme Court of the United States and a professor of law at Columbian College (which later became George Washington University).

== Early life and education ==
Cranch was born on July 17, 1769, in Weymouth, Massachusetts to Mary (Smith), a sister of First Lady Abigail Adams (Smith), and Richard Cranch, who had emigrated from Devonshire when he was twenty years old. His father, although educated as a watchmaker, became the town's postmaster and an ardent patriot during the American Revolutionary War. The elder Cranch then studied law and won election to the Massachusetts legislature (serving in both houses), then served many years as a judge of the court of common pleas, as well as wrote a religious book and received two honorary degrees from Harvard.

Cranch was born at the home of his maternal grandparents, Rev. William Smith and Elizabeth Quincy of the Quincy political family, about 12 miles south of Boston, since his mother retreated there from a smallpox outbreak in Boston. He was the only son of Richard and Mary, who both died within a day of each other, on October 16, 1811. Cranch received his first schooling from his mother, who also instructed him in Latin and Algebra. Then he prepared for Harvard College under the guidance of his uncle, Rev. William Shaw of Haverill, Massachusetts.

Cranch attended Harvard University with his cousin, John Quincy Adams, whose later-published diary mentions him. Cranch graduated in 1787, then read law with Thomas Dawes, a relative by marriage and judge of the Massachusetts Supreme Judicial Court.

== Legal career ==
Admitted to practice in the Massachusetts Court of Common Pleas in July 1790 and before the Supreme Judicial Court the following year, and New Hampshire courts not long after, Cranch began a private legal practice in Braintree, Massachusetts. He continued private practice in Haverhill, Massachusetts from 1790 to 1791. His first judicial position, as common for young lawyers of the time, was justice of the peace for Essex County, Massachusetts.

Following Congress's decision to move the capital to a new federal city in 1790, the 25-year-old Cranch moved to the area ceded by Maryland and Virginia that would eventually become Washington, D.C. Cranch was a land agent for the real estate firm of Morris, Greanleaf & Nicholson. He spent winter poring over accounts provided by his brother-in-law James Greenleaf (who was initially his sole client). Greenleaf had considerable property in the new capital city, and also speculated in Georgia land, but his $800,000 profit proved only on paper because a subsequent Georgia legislature voided the sale because the previous legislature had been bribed. Cranch later considered the experience, "learning the tricks of the world and the deceitfulness of accounts", perhaps in part because Greenleaf did not pay him money, but instead let Cranch use a 2,200 acre estate across the Eastern Branch of the Potomac River, where Cranch showed friends "the labor of my hands--my beautiful orchard, my peas, my melons, my grapes, my wheat and rye, my cabbage and lettuce" as well as various varieties of apples, pears, peaches, cherries and grapes, complaining only that only a single small rain shower had fallen in 57 days.

Before President John Adams moved to the new capital city, Greenleaf paid the new city's commissioners $120,00 and also spent more than $140,000 on a map, buildings and bridges, but found he had done so on the worthless promises of his partners Morris and Nicholson. Moreover, a man Greanleaf thought owed him money, William Duncanson, sued him and whipped Cranch for his legal actions on Greenleaf's behalf (but Cranch heeded Abigail's advice to trust in the law and "holy religion" rather than retaliate in a duel, as had Greenleaf). Greenleaf would go bankrupt and spent time in debtor's prison, as would another of Cranch's speculator clients, Robert Morris, but Cranch himself avoided debtor's prison for debts he had incurred on Morris' behalf when friends saved his property at the sheriff's sale (Cranch also took in boarders to meet expenses and eventually repaid all his creditors). Cranch's fledgling legal practices also had highs (such as winning a verdict in Annapolis from his client and creditor Law) and by the turn of the century, Cranch had filed over a thousand lawsuits in Maryland courts. Nonetheless, the pecuniary troubles nearly caused Cranch to move back to Massachusetts, but he reconsidered after one of John Adams' final acts as President.

In the waning days of his presidency, President Adams appointed Cranch one of the new Federal City's commissioners (the local government). Cranch replaced Gustavus Scott and served for less than two months in 1801, trying to extricate the board from its lack of cash and general financial plight, while also continuing his vigorous private legal practice. On February 27, 1801, Congress passed the District of Columbia Organic Act of 1801, which among other things established the court system and Cranch became one of the city's first judges, leaving his role as commissioner. The court initially opened in Alexandria, Virginia (then part of the federal city) and after a courthouse was built in Washington, would alternate sessions between the locations. A lack of housing in the new city meant that at times Cranch resided in Alexandria, Virginia. In 1825, Cranch moved his residence across the Potomac River, to Delaware Avenue.

== Federal judicial service ==
President John Adams nominated Cranch on February 28, 1801, to the United States Circuit Court of the District of Columbia. The Judiciary Act of 1801 authorized the new seat, the United States Senate affirmed the appointment on March 3, 1801 (President Adams' last day in office), and Cranch received his commission the same day. His service technically ended on February 24, 1806, when he was elevated to chief judge of the same court, as described below.

Notwithstanding his disagreement with other of President Adams' "midnight judges" which had led to the Judiciary Act of 1802 and the famous Marbury v. Madison Supreme Court decision, President Thomas Jefferson on February 21, 1806, nominated Cranch as the chief judge of the United States Circuit Court of the District of Columbia, when Chief Judge William Kilty resigned to become Chancellor of Maryland. The Senate confirmed the promotion on February 24, 1806, and Cranch received his commission the same day.

Cranch's Federalist Party died out in the mid-1820s; he was last holder of a United States government office who had been a Federalist.

=== Reporter and professor ===
While a federal judge, Cranch became the 2nd Reporter of Decisions of the Supreme Court of the United States from 1802 to 1815. However, the position had no salary nor was timely publication required, and the volumes were low on Judge Cranch's professional list of priorities, hence Justice Joseph Story and Attorney General Richard Rush advocated his replacement, with Henry Wheaton becoming the first official (and salaried) Reporter following the War of 1812. Cranch later told a successor, Richard Peters Jr. that he had lost $1,000 during his tenure. Judge Cranch also edited his own volume of reports on civil and criminal cases from the District of Columbia.

Meanwhile, in 1805, Cranch became a member of the first board of trustees for public schools and served on that board for 7 years. Moreover, on February 3, 1826, the Columbian College (now George Washington University) board of trustees selected Cranch and William Thomas Carroll, Esq., as that institution's first law professors. On June 13 of the same year, President John Quincy Adams attended Professor Cranch's first law lecture, in the court room of the City Hall. In 1827, Judge Cranch would deliver a memoir of the life, character and writings of John Adams before the Columbian, and in 1829 Harvard College would confer an honorary Doctor of Laws decree upon Cranch.

=== Decisions ===
Judge Cranch testified in 1816 before a committee chaired by Rep. John Randolph of Virginia which investigated the practice of slavecatchers who kidnapped free Blacks in order to sell them further South as slaves. Judge Cranch was one of the initial members of the American Colonization Society later that year, and remained on its board of managers for decades. He also issued two decisions that reversed attempts to persecute blacks in the new capital city. In 1821, he held a trial in the case of William Costin (1780–1842), a free Black man whom a justice of the peace had convicted of refusing to both show his freedom papers and post a bond under a new law. Cranch reversed the prior conviction, finding the law could not retrospectively impose restrictions upon free blacks who resided in the city before the 1820 charter that allowed city officials lawmaking powers. In 1836, he ruled in favor of Isaac Carey, another free Black, who continued to sell perfume despite a new law prohibiting African Americans from working at any occupation other than involving transportation without a license.

As a trial judge, Cranch heard several freedom suits by enslaved Blacks, many of them represented by attorney Francis Scott Key. A 1796 Maryland law forbade the importation of slaves, while the new federal city passed two relevant laws by the 1820s. One required residents to register their slaves within a year of their residence. Another fined non-residents who sought to hire out their slaves in the federal city. Several cases involves two Loudoun County men (Bernard Buckner and Ariss Buckner) who rented a house in D.C. in November 1826, registered two groups of slaves that winter, then returned to Loudoun County, Virginia, where Ariss Buckner was elected sheriff in 1833 but his election was contested because he had changed his residence to the federal city (but a Virginia court found he had maintained his Virginia residence and so upheld his election). In 1832 a D.C. jury found Buckner failed to register his slaves within one year of moving into the district, which caused some to be freed. However, in several related and well-publicized cases in July 1833, involving Fanny Jackson and her children who were jailed as runaways in the District of Columbia but trials held before juries sitting in the Alexandria division, those juries decided in favor of the slaveowners. In 1835, Judge Cranch ruled in favor of Rachel Brent, whom Buckner had left in the District of Columbia for five years after he moved back to Virginia, then bought her back to Virginia and sold her to slavetrader John Armfield.

Cranch also issued several decisions that set a precedent for jury nullification (allowing a jury to nullify an "unjust" law and refuse to convict), including:

- United States v. Fenwick, 25 F. Cas. 1062; 4 Cranch C.C. 675 (1836): Right to make legal argument to jury.
- Stettinius v. United States, 22 F. Cas. 1322; 5 Cranch C.C. 573 (1839): Right to make legal argument to jury.
- Kendall v. United States ex Rel. Stokes, 37 U.S. 524 (1838): Asserted the D.C. Circuit's right to issue Writs of mandamus.

Cranch also handed down important precedent in a variety of topics, for example in a criminal law case regarding the mens rea of intoxication, Cranch wrote:

It often happens that the prisoner seeks to palliate his crime by the pleas of intoxication; as if the voluntary abandonment of reason ... were not, of itself, an offense sufficient to make him responsible for all of its consequences.

== Personal life ==
Cranch married Nancy Greenleaf, the sister of Boston-born real estate investor James Greenleaf, who helped develop the new federal city with Philadelphian Robert Morris, but had severe financial problems which led to a stint in debtors' prison, his wife's establishing a separate residence in Allentown, Pennsylvania and Greenleaf spending his final years in a small house in the federal city near his sister and her husband. Nancy Cranch bore 13 children. Of the four Cranch sons who survived to adulthood, three became painters: Christopher Pearse Cranch, Edward P. Cranch, and John Cranch. Their daughter Abigail Adams Cranch married William Greenleaf Eliot, and their son Henry Ware Eliot was the father of poet T. S. Eliot. Judge Cranch did not remarry after his wife's death; James Greenleaf died the day after his sister, September 17, 1843, although Greenleaf Point would be named in his honor.

Judge Cranch owned four slaves in 1800. He owned an enslaved women of between 50 and 60 years old and two girls between 10 and 15 years old in 1830, and one enslaved woman between 10 and 24 years old in 1840.

== Death, honors and legacy ==
Judge Cranch's judicial service terminated on September 1, 1855, when he died in Washington, D.C. He was interred in Congressional Cemetery in Washington, D.C.

- In 1871, the Cranch Public School Building, named in Cranch's honor, opened at the southwest corner of 12th and G, SE in Washington, D.C. It was demolished in 1949.
- Cranch was elected an Associated Fellow of the American Academy of Arts and Sciences in 1809.
- Cranch was elected as a member of the American Antiquarian Society in 1813.
- During the 1820s, Cranch was a member of the prestigious society, Columbian Institute for the Promotion of Arts and Sciences, who counted among their members presidents Andrew Jackson and John Quincy Adams, and many prominent men of the day, including military officers and officials of government service, and leaders of medical and other professions.

== See also ==
- List of United States federal judges by longevity of service

== Sources ==
- White, Edward G. 1988. The Marshall Court and Cultural Change, 1815–1835. Vols. 3 and 4, History of the Supreme Court of the United States, 1815–1835. New York: Macmillan.
- Witt, Elder. 1990. Guide to the U.S. Supreme Court. 2d ed. Washington, D.C.: Congressional Quarterly

Legal offices
Preceded by Alexander J. Dallas	2nd Reporter of Decisions of the Supreme Court of the United States; 1801–1815	Succeeded by Henry Wheaton
Preceded by Seat established by 2 Stat. 103	Judge of the United States Circuit Court of the District of Columbia; 1801–1806	Succeeded by Allen Bowie Duckett
Preceded by William Kilty	Chief judge of the United States Circuit Court of the District of Columbia; 1806–1855	Succeeded by James Dunlop
