= Charles Mynn Thruston =

Union Army general (1798–1873)

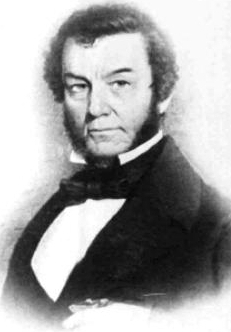
- Born: February 22, 1798; Lexington, Kentucky, U.S.
- Died: February 18, 1873 (aged 74); Cumberland, Maryland, U.S.
- Burial place: Rose Hill Cemetery, Cumberland, Maryland
- Spouse: Juliana Hughes (m. 1820)
- Children: 8
- Relatives: Buckner Thruston (father); Charles Mynn Thruston (grandfather)
- Military career
- Allegiance: United States; Union
- Branch: United States Army; Union Army
- Service years: 1814–1836, 1861–1862
- Rank: Brigadier General
- Conflicts: War of 1812; Seminole Wars; American Civil War

Charles Mynn Thruston (February 22, 1798 – February 18, 1873) was a career U.S. Army officer who retired to Maryland where he became a farmer and politician, then returned to service as a brigadier general in the Union Army during the American Civil War. He served as the mayor of Cumberland, Maryland, from 1861 to 1862.

== Early and family life ==
Thruston was born in Lexington, Kentucky, the son of Kentucky U.S. Senator Buckner Thruston. He was named for his grandfather, Col. Charles Mynn Thruston, who served in the American Revolutionary War and in the Virginia General Assembly. He had at least four brothers and two sisters.

In 1820, he married Juliana Hughes (1798–1881) of Baltimore, and they had at least six sons and two daughters. Their eldest son, William Sydney Thruston (1828–1864), fought for the Union Army as a captain of the 18th U.S. Infantry during the Civil War, but drowned after falling from a boat into the C&O Canal in June 1864.

== Military career ==
In 1814, 16-year-old Thruston graduated from the United States Military Academy, and served during the War of 1812 as an engineer on Governors Island, New York City. After the war, Thruston was promoted to the rank of captain in the artillery branch. He later fought in the Seminole Wars of the 1830s. In 1836, Thruston resigned from the Army and became a farmer in Maryland. Nonetheless, he or a relative owned one 15-year-old Black female slave in Louisville in 1850. In 1860, Thruston owned a 50-year-old enslaved man in Cumberland, Maryland, and his son George's wife Elizabeth owned four slaves (including a boy).

When the Civil War broke out, Thruston was mayor of Cumberland, Maryland, which was a critical railroad hub, as well as start of the National Road and on the Chesapeake and Ohio Canal (C&O Canal).

On September 7, 1861, Thruston accepted a commission as Brigadier General of U.S. Volunteers, with military authority to protect the B&O Railroad from Confederate raiders such as McNeill's Rangers. Being 63 years old at the time, he was one of the oldest generals to serve during the Civil War. However, Thruston had little success at stopping the Confederate raids from destroying railroad track. In April 1862, he resigned his commission and allowed a younger commander to assume the responsibility of protecting the B&O Railroad from the enemy cavalrymen.

== Death and legacy ==
Thruston died in Cumberland, Maryland, in 1873, survived by his widow, who in 1881 would be buried beside him in Rose Hill Cemetery on Cumberland's West Side.

== See also ==
- List of American Civil War generals (Union)

Preceded by John Humbird	Mayor of Cumberland; 1861-1862	Succeeded by Charles H. Ohr
