= Charles Mynn Thruston (colonel) =

American soldier and politician

Member of the Virginia House of Delegates from Frederick County, Virginia
- In office Oct. 17, 1785-Oct. 14, 1787 Serving with Alexander White, John Smith, John S. Woodcock
- Preceded by: James Wood
- Succeeded by: Alexander White
- In office Oct. 14, 1782-May 2, 1784 Serving with Alexander White
- Preceded by: Joseph Holmes
- Succeeded by: James Wood

Personal details
- Born: November 6, 1738 Gloucester County, Colony of Virginia
- Died: March 21, 1812 (aged 73) New Orleans, Louisiana, U.S.
- Spouses: Mary Buckner (m. 1760; died 1765) Ann Alexander (m. 1766)
- Relations: Charles Mynn Thruston (grandson)
- Children: Buckner Thruston, John Thruston, Charles Mynn Thruston Jr.
- Education: College of William and Mary

Military service
- Allegiance: United States
- Branch/service: Infantry
- Years of service: (United States) 1776–1777
- Rank: Colonel (Continental Army)
- Battles/wars: American Revolutionary War; Battle of Trenton (1776); Battle of Punk Hill (1777)

Charles Mynn Thruston (November 6, 1738 – March 21, 1812) was an American farmer, priest, military officer, politician, slaveowner and judge. He represented Frederick County, Virginia in the Second, Third and Fourth Virginia Conventions, then fought as an officer in the Continental Army during the American Revolutionary War, then represented Frederick County in the Virginia House of Delegates for several terms before moving to the Louisiana Territory, dying in New Orleans.

== Early and family life ==
Charles Thruston was born in Gloucester County, Virginia on November 6, 1738, to Col. John Thruston and his wife Sarah Mynn. The house, no longer standing, was at Gloucester Point. Thruston attended the College of William & Mary in 1754. He also studied for the ministry and was ordained, practicing in Gloucester County before moving west to Frederick County as discussed below.

He first married Mary Buckner, daughter of Colonel Samuel Buckner, in 1760. She died in 1765, but their son Buckner Thruston would become U.S. Senator from Kentucky, and later a U.S. District Judge. In 1766, Thruston remarried, to her cousin, Ann Alexander. He became a vestryman of Petsworth parish in Gloucester County in 1764, was ordained and served its minister in 1767 and continued until 1768 when he moved to Frederick County, Virginia. He then farmed as well as served as minister of Christ Episcopal Church until 1776.

== Soldier ==
When he was 20, Thruston led a militia unit that assisted in the evacuation of Fort Duquesne during the French and Indian War.

In 1775 and 1776, Frederick County voters elected Thruston and Isaac Zane Jr. as their delegates to the Second, Third and Fourth Virginia Conventions. In 1776, Thruston organized a company to help George Washington in New Jersey as a part of the American Revolutionary War. Wounded during the Battle of Punk Hill (March 8, 1777), Thruston lost the use of an arm.

== Politician, judge and planter ==
After the war, Thruston returned to farming in Frederick County, using enslaved labor. With one exception, Frederick County voters elected and re-elected Thruston to represent them (part time) in the Virginia House of Delegates from 1782 through 1788. He served alongside Alexander White, then with John Smith in 1786–1787, and finally alongside John Shearman Woodcock, then became a county judge. He owned 7 adult and five child slaves in Frederick County in 1787, and an additional five enslaved children in Gloucester County.

In 1808 Thruston moved to Louisiana where he resided until his death in New Orleans on March 12, 1812.
