= Buckner Thruston =

United States federal judge (1763–1845)

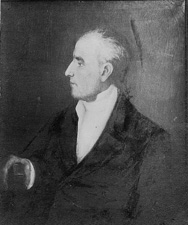

Judge of the United States Circuit Court of the District of Columbia
- In office December 14, 1809 – August 30, 1845
- Appointed by: James Madison
- Preceded by: Allen Bowie Duckett
- Succeeded by: James Dunlop

United States Senator from Kentucky
- In office March 4, 1805 – December 18, 1809
- Preceded by: John Brown
- Succeeded by: Henry Clay

Personal details
- Born: February 9, 1763 Gloucester County, Colony of Virginia, British America
- Died: August 30, 1845 (aged 82) Washington, D.C.
- Resting place: Congressional Cemetery; Washington, D.C.
- Party: Democratic-Republican
- Children: Charles Mynn Thruston
- Parent: Charles Mynn Thruston (father)
- Education: College of William & Mary (A.B.)

Buckner Thruston (February 9, 1763 – August 30, 1845) was an American lawyer, slaveowner and politician who served as United States Senator from Kentucky as well as in the Virginia House of Delegates and became a United States circuit judge of the United States Circuit Court of the District of Columbia.

== Early life and education ==
Born on February 9, 1764, in Petsworth Parish in Gloucester County, Colony of Virginia, British America, His grandfather had been colonel of the local militia, and a farmer who used enslaved labor. His father Charles Mynn Thruston also farmed, but was educated and ordained as a minister, then moved his family westward to Frederick County where he again farmed (using enslaved labor), as well as served as a minister until 1776. Rev. Thruston became known as a "fighting parson" for he recruited a military company, joined the Continental Army and rose to the rank of colonel, but also lost the use of an arm as a result of a combat wound. Meanwhile, back in Frederick County, Buckner Thruston received an education appropriate to his class. His mother had died when he was an infant, but his father remarried, so the family included several brothers and sisters. He traveled to Williamsburg for higher education and received an Artium Baccalaureus degree in 1783 from the College of William & Mary.

== Legal and political careers ==
Thruston was admitted to the Virginia bar and moved to what was then Kentucky County, then the District of Kentucky and the Commonwealth of Kentucky from June 1, 1792, where many revolutionary war veterans had received land. He established a private practice in Lexington.

Jefferson County voters elected Thruston and Abner Field to the Virginia House of Delegates in 1789, but replaced the pair the next year. Thus, he did not serve alongside his father, who was again one of the delegates representing Frederick County, Virginia in the previous and next sessions. After fellow legislators made his father a Virginia judge, Thruston became a commissioner for the boundary dispute between Kentucky and Virginia in 1791. He was a Judge of the Kentucky District Court in 1791. He was clerk of the Kentucky Senate from 1792 to 1794. Kentucky's legislature named Thruston as a Judge of the Kentucky Circuit Court, where he served from 1802 to 1803.

After his father moved to Louisiana shortly after President Jefferson made the Louisiana Purchase, Thruston was offered an appointment as United States District Judge of the United States District Court for the District of Orleans in 1804, but declined.

Kentucky legislators elected Thruston as a Democratic-Republican to the United States Senate, and he served from March 4, 1805, to December 18, 1809, when he resigned to accept a federal judicial appointment.

== Federal judge ==
On December 12, 1809, President James Madison nominated Thruston to a seat on the United States Circuit Court of the District of Columbia vacated by Judge Allen Bowie Duckett. The United States Senate confirmed him on December 13, 1809, and Thruston received his commission on December 14, 1809. His service terminated on August 30, 1845, due to his death in Washington, D.C. He was interred in Congressional Cemetery in Washington, D.C.

== Personal life ==
Thruston married and had several children. The family also owned household slaves in Washington, D.C. In 1820, the Thruston household included 3 enslaved boys, as well as two enslaved mature women, and two free Blacks. In 1830, the Thruston household included five slaves. His son Charles Mynn Thruston, became a career U.S. Army officer, and retired to Cumberland, Maryland, where he farmed and became the mayor as the American Civil War started, when he resumed service as a general of volunteers in the Union Army, though he relinquished the post in 1862 in favor of a younger generation.

== See also ==
- List of United States federal judges by longevity of service

== Sources ==
- United States Congress. "Buckner Thruston (id: T000249)". Biographical Directory of the United States Congress.
- Buckner Thruston at the Biographical Directory of Federal Judges, a publication of the Federal Judicial Center.

U.S. Senate
Preceded by John Brown	United States Senator (Class 2) from Kentucky; 1805–1809	Succeeded by Henry Clay
Legal offices
Preceded by Allen Bowie Duckett	Judge of the United States Circuit Court of the District of Columbia; 1809–1845	Succeeded by James Dunlop
