= James Markham Marshall =

American judge (1764–1848)

Judge of the United States Circuit Court of the District of Columbia
- In office March 3, 1801 – November 16, 1803
- Appointed by: John Adams
- Preceded by: Seat established by 2 Stat. 103
- Succeeded by: Nicholas Battalle Fitzhugh

Personal details
- Born: James Markham Marshall; March 12, 1764 Fauquier County, Colony of Virginia, British America
- Died: April 26, 1848 (aged 84) Fauquier County, Virginia
- Resting place: Marshall family cemetery, Front Royal, Warren County, Virginia
- Spouse: Hester Morris
- Education: read law

Military service
- Allegiance: United States
- Branch/service: Continental Army; United States Army
- Years of service: 1776–1783 (Continental Army); 1798–1800 (U.S. Army)
- Rank: Lieutenant colonel (Continental Army); Major general (U.S. Army)
- Battles/wars: American Revolutionary War

James Markham Marshall (March 12, 1764 – April 26, 1848) was an American lawyer, Revolutionary War soldier and planter who briefly served as United States circuit judge of the United States Circuit Court of the District of Columbia.

== Early life and education ==
Born on March 12, 1764, in Fauquier County, Colony of Virginia, British America, Marshall was educated at home. Marshall was among the sixteen children of land surveyor and Revolutionary War Colonel, Thomas Marshall; his eldest brother John Marshall also served in the military before becoming a lawyer, planter and Chief Justice of the United States Supreme Court. After his wartime service, move to what became the state of Kentucky with his father and most siblings, and marriage in Philadelphia, Pennsylvania discussed below, James Marshall returned to Virginia in 1795.

== American Revolutionary War ==
Marshall volunteered for the 1st Virginia Regiment, commanded by Alexander Hamilton, of the Continental Army in 1779 during the American Revolutionary War, enlisting as a private and receiving a promotion to lieutenant. In the war's closing days, Marshall led a charge during the Siege of Yorktown.

== Personal life ==
In 1795, Marshall married Hester Morris, daughter of Robert Morris, an English-born merchant in Philadelphia who helped finance the Continental forces during the American Revolutionary War (hence sometimes called the "financier of the American Revolution"), but who suffered severe financial reverses as a result of his land speculations, which led to the Panic of 1796 and his own imprisonment for debt from 1798-1801. Nonetheless, the couple remained married until her death in 1816. She accompanied him to Europe on the diplomatic/commercial tour discussed below, and delivered two of their children aboard American ships near England, and several more on solid American soil. Their children included: Robert Morris Marshall (1797-1870), James Marshall Jr. (1802-1880), John Marshall (1804-1855), Henry Morris Marshall (1811-1896) and Susan Marshall Ambler (1812-1896).

== Career ==
Following the war, in 1785, Marshall moved to Kentucky with his father and many siblings, since soldiers received land claims as bounty, and his father had become surveyor for Fayette County. Marshall also emulated his eldest brother John Marshall and read law. Admitted to the Virginia bar in 1788, Marshall began a private legal practice in Fayette County, District of Kentucky, Virginia (State of Kentucky from June 1, 1792). In 1790, he ran for the 2nd congressional district. He moved to the new federal city (now the District of Columbia) and continued private legal practice in Alexandria (the part ceded by Virginia to create the new capital and which decades later returned to Virginia) until 1801.

=== The "Spanish conspiracy" ===
Marshall bore a conspicuous part in the discussions concerning the “Spanish conspiracy.” His statement that Don Diego de Gardoqui, the Spanish minister at Washington, had been in communication with John Brown looking to the withdrawal of Kentucky from the United States, was bitterly denounced by James Brown, afterward minister to France, which led to a challenge from Marshall, but the duel was prevented after the parties reached the ground.

=== European negotiations ===
Marshall was the commercial agent of New York City, New York, Boston, Massachusetts and Charleston, South Carolina in France during the Reign of Terror. President George Washington authorized him as minister plenipotentiary to become the agent of the United States to negotiate for the release of the Marquis de Lafayette, who was then a prisoner in Austria.

While in England Marshall on his own behalf as well as that of his brother John, Rawleigh Colston and Lighthorse Harry Lee negotiated for the purchase of 180,000 acres of land in northern and western Virginia known as the Fairfax propriety estate, which would become the subject of much litigation in Virginia and federal courts before he and his brother John won Martin v. Hunter's Lessee in the United States Supreme Court (John Marshall abstaining) and received the considerable acreage in “Leeds Manor,” where their posterity continue to reside.

=== Land and slaveholdings ===
Marshall would buy out Lighthorse Harry Lee and thus had a double share of the northern neck propriety lands, and would build a house he called "Happy Creek" on them, although it would burn down long before the American Civil war. In the 1810 federal census, Marshall owned 27 slaves in Frederick County, Virginia (of which Winchester is the county seat). The Supreme Court decision in Martin v. Hunter's Lessee in 1816 affirmed the Marshall brothers' purchase of the Fairfax lands, and thus allowed them to remove squatters and resell the land they had cleared. This made the Marshalls wealthy, and in the 1820 census, Marshall owned 39 slaves in Frederick County. The then made Fauquier County his main residence, and owned 47 slaves in the 1830 census. In the final census of his lifetime, after making provision for his children, he owned 32 slaves in Fauquier County.

== Federal judicial service ==
President John Adams nominated Marshall on February 28, 1801, to the United States Circuit Court of the District of Columbia, to a new seat authorized by 2 Stat. 103. The United States Senate confirmed the nomination on March 3, 1801, and Marshall received his commission the same day. However, President Adams had already lost the election for a second term, so these nominations became controversial and the Judiciary Act of 1801 (a/k/a the "Midnight Judges Act") was repealed by the Judiciary Act of 1802 following the inauguration of President Adams' opponent, President Thomas Jefferson. Marshall's brother also failed to deliver some of the commissions, which led to the famous Supreme Court case of Marbury v. Madison. Judge Marshall later resigned and his federal judicial service terminated on November 16, 1803.

== Later career and death ==
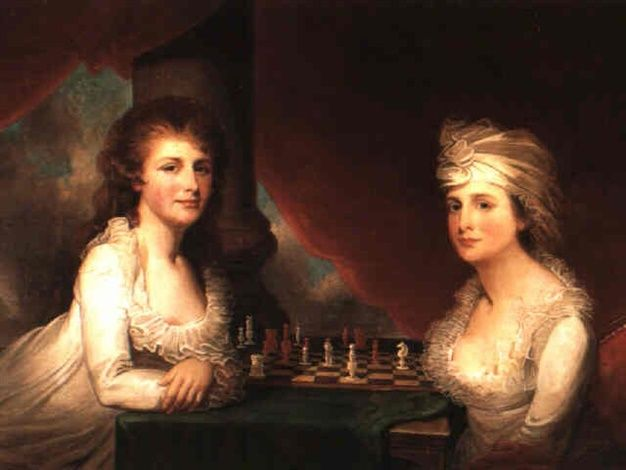
Hester Morris Marshall (right) and her sister Maria Morris, portrait by Gilbert Stuart

Following his resignation from the federal bench, Marshall resumed his private legal practice, this time at the gateway to the Shenandoah Valley as well as county seat of Frederick County. Thus, in addition to his agricultural operations, Marshall practiced law in Winchester, Virginia and surrounding counties for the next four decades.

Marshall outlived his famous eldest brother by more than a decade, dying on April 26, 1848, in Fauquier County, and is buried in the Marshall family cemetery in Front Royal, Warren County, Virginia.

== See also ==
- James Markham Ambler, his grandson

== Sources ==
Legal offices
| Preceded by Seat established by 2 Stat. 103 | Judge of the United States Circuit Court of the District of Columbia; 1801–1803 | Succeeded by Nicholas Battalle Fitzhugh |
