= Arthur Sewall =

American politician (1835–1900)

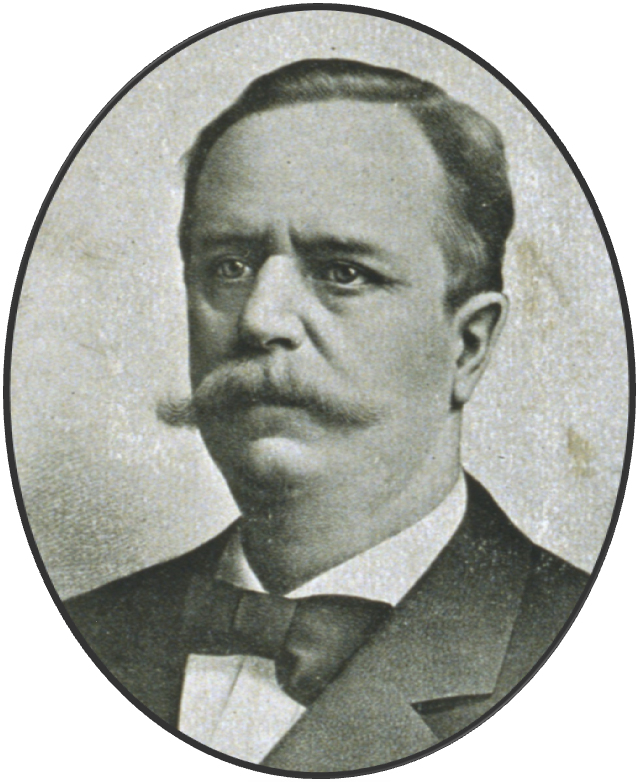

President of the Maine Central Railroad
- In office 1884–1893

Personal details
- Born: November 25, 1835 Bath, Maine, U.S.
- Died: September 5, 1900 (aged 64) Small Point, Maine, U.S.
- Party: Democratic
- Spouse: Emma Duncan Crocker
- Children: 2, including Harold
- Parents: William Sewall (father); Rachael Sewall (mother)

Arthur Sewall (November 25, 1835 – September 5, 1900) was an American shipbuilder from Maine, best known as the Democratic nominee for Vice President of the United States in 1896, running mate to William Jennings Bryan. From 1888 to 1896, he served as a member of the Democratic National Committee and unsuccessfully ran for Maine's Senate seat against Eugene Hale. The only elective offices Sewall held were as councilman and alderman in the town of Bath, Maine.

== Life ==
On November 25, 1835, Arthur Sewall was born to William and Rachel Sewall in Bath, Maine. In 1892 Sewall launched the Roanoke, which at the time was the world's largest wooden ship.

Following the death of his father, he and his brother led their successful and wealthy shipbuilding business, and he took complete control following his brother's death in 1879. He served as President of the Maine Central railroad from 1884 to 1893 and also served as President of the Bath National Bank.

He attended every Democratic National Convention between 1872 and 1900 with the exception of 1876, though he was a strong admirer of the Democratic Party's nominee for president that year, Samuel Tilden, and believed that the election was stolen from Tilden in 1876. He was also defeated in a race for the U.S. Senate in 1893.

In June 1895, he came out in support of free silver, and he took third place on the first ballot for vice president at the 1896 Democratic National Convention behind Representative Joseph C. Sibley and Publisher John R. McLean and after initially losing delegates on the second ballot rebounded and took the majority on the fifth ballot before being nominated by acclamation. His selection is believed to have been an effort to win votes among conservative and New England members of the party who were disturbed by the populist aspects of William Jennings Bryan. He was in favor of high tariffs and almost imperialistic in foreign policy, so he and Bryan agreed largely only on the monetary question. Arthur Sewall was also one of the few politicians who was an adherent of Swedenborgiansm, a religion based on the writings of Swedish theologian Emanuel Swedenborg. His main vice-presidential opponent, Garret A. Hobart (Rep), was also an Eastern banker and industrialist who had served on his party's national committee. Sewall was Bryan's running mate for the first of Bryan's three times as the Democratic presidential nominee.

On September 5, 1900, Sewall died in Small Point, Maine, from apoplexy. He is interred in Oak Grove Cemetery in Bath, Maine. At the time of his death, he was worth $5,000,000 ($167,350,000 in 2022 dollars).

== Legacy ==
Sewall's grandson, Sumner Sewall, served as Governor of Maine from 1941 to 1945, as a Republican.

In 2008, the St. Louis Post-Dispatch referenced Sewall in an article criticizing Senator John McCain's selection of Gov. Sarah Palin as his vice presidential candidate in the 2008 presidential election, saying he had picked "the least qualified running mate since the Swedenborgian shipbuilder Arthur Sewall ran as William Jennings Bryan's No. 2 in 1896."

Party political offices
Preceded by Adlai Stevenson (I)	Democratic nominee for Vice President of the United States; 1896	Succeeded by Adlai Stevenson (I)
