= James Cantrill =

James Cantrill may refer to:

- James E. Cantrill, captain in the Confederate States Army Cavalry
- J. Campbell Cantrill, U.S. Representative from Kentucky
