= Llangibby =

Llangibby can refer to:

- Llangybi, Monmouthshire (also spelled Llangibby), a town in Wales.

Ships named after this town, or its castle:

- Llangibby (ship)
- MV Llangibby Castle
