= Luke P. Blackburn =

American physician and governor of Kentucky (1816–1887)

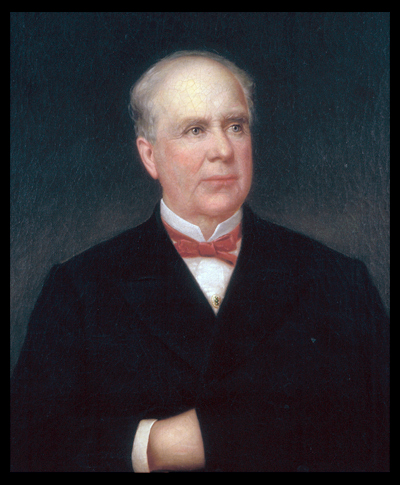
- 1883 portrait

28th Governor of Kentucky
- In office September 2, 1879 – September 5, 1883
- Lieutenant: James E. Cantrill
- Preceded by: James B. McCreary
- Succeeded by: J. Proctor Knott

Member of the Kentucky House of Representatives
- In office 1843–1844

Personal details
- Born: Luke Pryor Blackburn; June 16, 1816 Woodford County, Kentucky, U.S.
- Died: September 14, 1887 (aged 71) Frankfort, Kentucky, U.S.
- Resting place: Frankfort Cemetery
- Party: Democratic; Whig
- Spouses: Ella Gist Boswell (m. 1835; died 1856) Julia Churchill (m. 1857)
- Relations: J. C. S. Blackburn (brother); James W. Blackburn (brother)
- Education: Transylvania University
- Profession: Physician

Military service
- Allegiance: Confederate States of America
- Branch/service: Confederate Secret Service
- Years of service: 1862–1864
- Rank: Surgeon, blockade runner
- Battles/wars: American Civil War

Luke Pryor Blackburn (June 16, 1816 – September 14, 1887) was an American medical doctor, philanthropist, and politician from Kentucky. He was elected the 28th governor of Kentucky, serving from 1879 to 1883.

After earning a medical degree at Transylvania University, Blackburn moved to Natchez, Mississippi, and gained national fame for implementing the first successful quarantine against yellow fever in the Mississippi River valley in 1848. He came to be regarded as an expert on yellow fever and often worked pro bono to combat outbreaks. Among his philanthropic ventures was the construction of a hospital for Mississippi River boatmen using his personal funds. He later successfully lobbied Congress to construct a series of similar hospitals along the Mississippi.

In the early days of the American Civil War, he acted as a civilian agent for the governments of Kentucky and Mississippi. By 1863, he was aiding Confederate blockade runners in Canada. In 1864, he traveled to Bermuda to help combat a yellow fever outbreak that threatened Confederate blockade running operations there. Shortly after the war's end, a Confederate double agent accused him of having carried out a plot to start a yellow fever epidemic in the Northern United States that would have hampered the Union war effort. The evidence against Blackburn was considerable, although much of it was either circumstantial or provided by witnesses of questionable reputation. Although he was acquitted by a Toronto court, public sentiment was decidedly against him throughout much of the United States. Historians still disagree as to the strength of the evidence supporting Blackburn's role in the alleged plot.

Blackburn remained in Canada to avoid prosecution by U.S. authorities, but he returned to his home country in 1868 to help combat a yellow fever outbreak along the Gulf Coast of Texas and Louisiana. He rehabilitated his public image by rendering aid in yellow fever outbreaks in Memphis, Tennessee, in 1873, Fernandina, Florida, in 1877, and Hickman, Kentucky, in 1878. Dubbed the "Hero of Hickman", Blackburn's ministrations propelled him to the Democratic gubernatorial nomination the following year. In the general election, he defeated Republican Walter Evans by a wide margin. As governor, Blackburn won passage of several reforms in the areas of state finance and internal improvements, but his signature accomplishments were in the area of penal reform. Troubled by the conditions at the penitentiary in Frankfort, Blackburn attempted to ease overcrowding through liberal use of his gubernatorial pardon, earning him the derisive nickname "Lenient Luke". He also secured approval of the construction of a new penitentiary at Eddyville, the adoption of a warden system to replace the corrupt private oversight of the old penitentiary, and the implementation of the state's first parole system. Although his record of reform led historians to laud him as "the father of prison reform in Kentucky", his liberal pardon record and expenditure of scarce taxpayer money to improve the living conditions of prisoners was unpopular at the time, and he was booed and shouted down at his own party's nominating convention in 1883. After his term as governor, he returned to his medical practice and died in 1887. The Blackburn Correctional Complex, a minimum-security penal facility near Lexington, Kentucky, was named in his honor in 1972.

== Early life and family ==
Luke Blackburn was born June 16, 1816, in Woodford County, Kentucky. He was the fourth of thirteen children born to Edward M. ("Ned") and Lavinia (Bell) Blackburn. Blackburn's great-uncle, Gideon Blackburn, was a well-known Presbyterian missionary and served as president of Centre College in Danville, Kentucky. Many of Blackburn's relatives were involved in politics. His maternal grandfather was a delegate to the 1799 Kentucky Constitutional Convention and his uncle, William Blackburn, was President Pro Tempore of the Kentucky Senate and acting lieutenant governor in the administration of Governor James Turner Morehead. Noted statesman Henry Clay was also a distant cousin, and occasionally visited the Blackburn home.

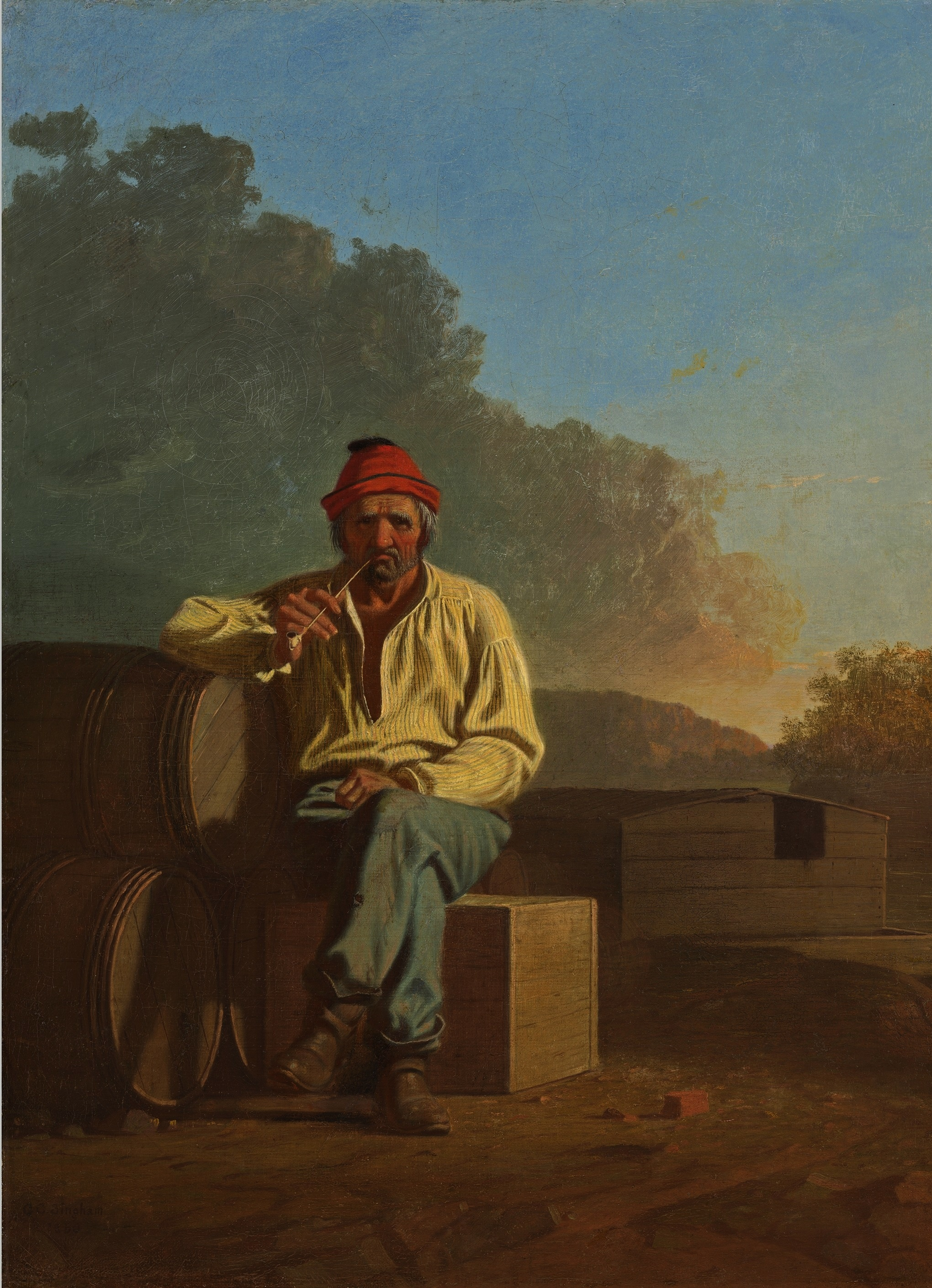
Blackburn's early philanthropic work benefited boatmen working on the Mississippi River.

Blackburn obtained his early education in the local public schools. At age sixteen, he began a medical apprenticeship under his uncle, physician Churchill Blackburn. During his apprenticeship, he aided his uncle in treating victims of cholera outbreaks in Lexington and Paris. He later matriculated to Transylvania University in Lexington, Kentucky, where he earned a medical degree in March 1835. After graduation, he opened a medical practice in Lexington and was instrumental in combating a cholera epidemic in nearby Versailles. He accepted no payment for his services during the epidemic.

On November 24, 1835, Blackburn married his distant cousin, Ella Gist Boswell. Boswell's father, Dr. Joseph Boswell, had died in the Lexington cholera epidemic a year earlier. The couple's only child, son Cary Bell Blackburn, was born in 1837. Just before Cary's birth, Blackburn invested heavily in the hemp rope and bagging industry and suffered a significant financial loss when the business venture subsequently failed. In 1843, Blackburn was elected as a Whig to the Kentucky House of Representatives and served a single, undistinguished term. He did not seek re-election, and in 1844, he and his younger brother opened a medical practice in Frankfort, Kentucky.

Drawn by the city's prosperous economy, the Blackburns relocated to Natchez, Mississippi, in 1847. Luke Blackburn quickly became an active member of the community, helping found a temperance society, joining a militia group, and becoming the administrator of a local hospital. He became a close associate of Jefferson Davis and William Johnson. In 1848, Blackburn served as the city's health officer and implemented the first successful quarantine against a yellow fever outbreak in the Mississippi River valley. Using his own personal funds, he established a hospital for boatmen who navigated the Mississippi River. He also successfully lobbied the Congress to establish a hospital in Natchez; upon its completion in 1852, he was appointed surgeon there. In 1854, he implemented another successful quarantine against yellow fever. The Mississippi Legislature commissioned Blackburn to lobby the Louisiana State Legislature to establish a quarantine at New Orleans to protect cities along the Mississippi River; Louisiana authorized him to organize such a system.

Blackburn and his son Cary traveled to Philadelphia, Pennsylvania, in September 1854 to secure an apprenticeship for Cary under noted physician Samuel D. Gross. While they were there, a yellow fever outbreak hit Fort Washington near Long Island, New York. The mayor of New York City asked Blackburn to help treat victims of the outbreak; Blackburn accepted the invitation and refused compensation for his services. When he returned home in November 1856, he found his wife Ella, who suffered from dropsy and a nervous condition, ailing with a fever. Despite Blackburn's efforts to save her, Ella Blackburn's condition worsened and she died before the end of the month. Blackburn was stricken with grief, and friends encouraged him to tour Europe, as he had often spoken of doing, to ease his sorrow. He did so in early 1857, visiting hospitals in England, Scotland, France, and Germany. While in Paris, Blackburn met fellow Kentuckian Julia M. Churchill, who was traveling with her sister and niece. Blackburn and Churchill cut their journeys short, returned home, and were married in November 1857. After their honeymoon, the couple took up residence in New Orleans in January 1858, and Blackburn resumed his medical practice. A brief poem written by Blackburn indicates that the couple had a daughter named Abby, but the child apparently died as an infant, and her birth and death dates are unknown.

== Civil War ==
Blackburn's sympathies lay with the Confederacy at the outbreak of the Civil War. Too old to enlist in the Confederate Army, he acted as an envoy for Kentucky governor Beriah Magoffin to obtain weapons from Louisiana for the defense of Kentucky, but he failed to secure the arms. In early 1862, he was assigned to the staff of Major General Sterling Price as a surgeon. Mississippi Governor John J. Pettus appointed him as one of two commissioners to oversee the care of the state's wounded soldiers in February 1863. After securing sufficient medical supplies for the wounded, Blackburn traveled to Richmond, Virginia, to meet with Confederate Secretary of War James Seddon and offered to serve as General Inspector of Hospitals and Camps without taking compensation or a rank. When the offer was refused, Governor Pettus asked Blackburn to travel to Canada to collect provisions for blockade runners there. Blackburn and his wife left Mississippi for Halifax, Nova Scotia, in August 1863, then continued on to Toronto (in what was then the Province of Canada) where they lodged in a boardinghouse. On one occasion, Blackburn was aboard a blockade running ship carrying ice from Halifax to Mobile, Alabama, when the ship was captured by the Union Navy. Union officials assumed Blackburn was a civilian passenger on the vessel and released him, after which he returned to Canada.

A devastating outbreak of yellow fever struck the island of Bermuda in April 1864. The island was a major base of operations for Confederate blockade runners, and the epidemic threatened their continued operations there. At the request of Charles Monck, the Governor General of the United Provinces of Canada, Blackburn traveled to Bermuda to aid soldiers and civilians there. Blackburn continued his ministrations until mid-July when he briefly returned to Halifax. The epidemic on the island continued, and Blackburn returned there in September to continue aiding the victims. He remained there until the outbreak abated in mid-October. For his efforts in Bermuda, Blackburn received 100 British pounds and a commendation from Queen Victoria. Although little is known of his actions in Canada for the remainder of the war, he was rumored to have been part of a plot to incite massive insurrections in New England as a diversion, allowing fellow Confederate agent Thomas Hines to lead a prison break at Camp Douglas in Chicago. When word of the plot was leaked to Union officials, they sent troops to reinforce Boston, Massachusetts, Blackburn's rumored target, quashing his role in the operation.

=== Yellow fever plot ===
President Abraham Lincoln was alleged to have been a target of Blackburn's yellow fever plot

On April 12, 1865, just days after the last major battle of the Civil War, a Confederate double agent named Godfrey Joseph Hyams approached the U.S. consul in Toronto claiming to have information about a plot by Blackburn to infect Northern cities with yellow fever. Hyams said he and Blackburn had been introduced by Confederate agent Stuart Robinson at the Queen's Hotel in Toronto in December 1863. According to Hyams, he had agreed to help Blackburn smuggle trunks of clothes used by patients infected with yellow fever from Bermuda into Boston, Massachusetts; Philadelphia, Pennsylvania; Washington D.C.; New Bern, North Carolina; and Norfolk, Virginia (the latter two cities being occupied by Union troops). Hyams said he was instructed to sell the trunks' contents to used clothing merchants, and that Blackburn, subscribing to the common nineteenth century belief that yellow fever could be spread by contact, hoped that by dispersing the "contaminated" articles throughout these major cities he could trigger an epidemic that would cripple the Northern war effort. Hyams further alleged that Blackburn had filled a valise with fine shirts and instructed him to deliver it to President Abraham Lincoln at the White House, saying they were from an anonymous admirer. Upon completion of these tasks, Hyams said, Blackburn had promised to pay him $60,000. Hyams claimed he delivered the trunks as agreed, but did not attempt to deliver the valise to President Lincoln. According to his testimony, he never received more than nominal compensation for his efforts, partially prompting his decision to reveal the plot to the authorities.

Independent of Hyams' testimony, officials in Bermuda had received information that Blackburn had collected a second cache of "contaminated" garments and linens. According to this information, Blackburn contracted with Edward Swan, a hotel owner in St. George's, to store them until mid-1865 and then ship them to New York City, in an attempt to start an outbreak there. Acting on this intelligence, Bermudan officials raided Swan's hotel and found three trunks of garments and linens with stains consistent with the "black vomit" symptomatic of yellow fever. Swan was arrested and charged with violating the local health code. The contents of the trunks were soaked with sulfuric acid and buried.

The assassination of Abraham Lincoln just two days after Hyams related his story to Canadian officials heightened U.S. interest in arresting Blackburn to connect the assassination to Confederate President Jefferson Davis and his operatives in Canada. The U.S. Bureau of Military Justice ordered Blackburn's arrest for attempted murder, but an arrest could not be effected because Blackburn was in Canada, beyond the Bureau's jurisdiction. The subsequent discovery of the cache of garments and linens in Bermuda convinced Canadian authorities to act. They arrested Blackburn on May 19, 1865, charging him with violation of Canada's neutrality in the Civil War. He was held for trial on $8,000 bond. In October 1865, a Toronto court acquitted Blackburn on grounds that the trunks of garments had been shipped to Nova Scotia, which was out of the court's jurisdiction. A charge of conspiracy to commit murder was dropped after Blackburn's attorney reminded the court that such a charge could only be made if the accused had made an attempt on the life of a head of state. Blackburn did not testify in the trial and only spoke of the plot years later when he denounced it as "too preposterous for intelligent gentlemen to believe."

Historians disagree as to the strength of the evidence against Blackburn, and many of the federal and Confederate records relating to the case have been lost. Writing in the journal America's Civil War, U.S. Navy physician J. D. Haines notes that the Confederate agents who testified against Blackburn were of dubious reputation. Hyams in particular received immunity from prosecution and was paid for his testimony. Haines also points out that Blackburn's previous reputation as a humanitarian was ignored; in the hysteria following Lincoln's assassination, conspiracy theories abounded and Northerners were inclined to believe the worst about anyone with Confederate sympathies. The New York Times vilified Blackburn as "The Yellow Fever Fiend" and "a hideous devil". Historian Edward Steers concedes that the evidence against Blackburn was circumstantial, but in his book Blood on the Moon, he contends that enough evidence survives not only to prove Blackburn's involvement in the plot, but to show that high-ranking Confederate officials up to and including President Jefferson Davis were aware of, condoned, and financed it. As well as a violation of his Hippocratic Oath, Blackburn's plot was one of the earliest attempts at a refined biological warfare.

== Post-war humanitarian work ==
After his acquittal, Blackburn remained in Canada to avoid arrest and prosecution by U.S. authorities. When he learned of a yellow fever outbreak in New Orleans and the Texas Gulf Coast, Blackburn wrote to President Andrew Johnson on September 4, 1867, asking permission to return to the U.S. and help treat the disease. Not waiting for Johnson's response—which never came—Blackburn returned to the U.S., arriving in Louisville on September 25, 1867, en route to New Orleans. After rendering aid during the epidemic, he and his family moved to an Arkansas plantation owned by his wife.

No attempt to arrest Blackburn was made, and he returned to Kentucky with his family in early 1873. The family lived in Louisville's Galt House hotel, and Blackburn resumed his medical practice in that city. During a cholera epidemic in 1873, Blackburn rightly theorized that the disease was spread by the consumption of contaminated water, but most citizens accepted the competing theory that cholera was a miasmatic disease. This theory was espoused by Thomas S. Bell, a better-known physician in Louisville. Thousands died as a result of failing to heed Blackburn's advice to boil potentially contaminated water before drinking it. Blackburn's philanthropic work included treating victims of yellow fever outbreaks in Memphis, Tennessee, in 1873 and Fernandina, Florida, in 1877. He refused to accept compensation for his services in either city, but was presented with gifts from appreciative residents in both cases. Several southern newspapers also carried glowing accounts of Blackburn's service.

Louisville's Courier-Journal carried an announcement of Blackburn's candidacy for the Democratic gubernatorial nomination in Kentucky on February 11, 1878. It is not clear why, with only meager prior political experience, he decided to seek the office. He may have been influenced by the members of his family who were involved in politics. His brother Joseph was, at the time, a member of the U.S. House of Representatives, and another brother, James, had served in the Kentucky Senate. Two of his wife's brothers also held political office; Samuel Churchill was Secretary of State under Governors John L. Helm, John W. Stevenson, and Preston Leslie, and Thomas Churchill served as treasurer and later governor of the state of Arkansas. Whatever the reason, even his friends did not believe his announcement was wise due to his political inexperience. He opened his campaign with a speech in Owen County on March 29, 1878.

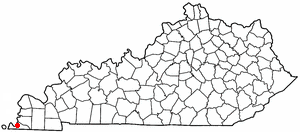
Blackburn's aid during a yellow fever outbreak in Hickman, Kentucky (marked) earned him the moniker "Hero of Hickman"

About the same time as his gubernatorial campaign began, Blackburn appeared before the Kentucky General Assembly to advocate measures to protect the state against disease outbreaks, including the creation of a state board of health and the construction of quarantine centers in the state's border towns. To a large degree, his pleas fell upon deaf ears, with the exception of his proposal for the state board of health, which was created in March 1878. Soon after, news came that yellow fever had appeared in the lower Mississippi Valley earlier than usual; by August 1878, it had reached epidemic proportions. Blackburn advocated implementing quarantines to deal with the influx of people fleeing north to escape the disease, but many of the state's doctors did not believe yellow fever could survive as far north as Kentucky. Some towns in the Jackson Purchase region attempted to implement crude quarantines, but the city of Louisville completely ignored Blackburn's advice and welcomed refugees from the South. Blackburn temporarily halted his gubernatorial campaign and traveled to Louisville to help treat those who arrived there already suffering from the disease.

On September 5, the mayor of Hickman, Kentucky, a small western town along the Mississippi River, telegraphed the state board of health, informing them that yellow fever had reached epidemic levels in the city and requesting that Blackburn be sent to them as soon as possible. Blackburn arrived on September 7 to find that roughly 20 percent of the town's population were ill with yellow fever. He organized cleanup crews to disinfect the town and a squad of Negroes to guard vacated homes. In late September, when it appeared the Hickman epidemic was waning, Blackburn traveled to Chattanooga and Martin, Tennessee, to render aid, but within ten days, he received word that the outbreak in Hickman had resurged and spread to nearby Fulton, Kentucky. Blackburn returned to the area and continued his ministrations until late October, when the outbreak had fully subsided.

== Governor of Kentucky ==
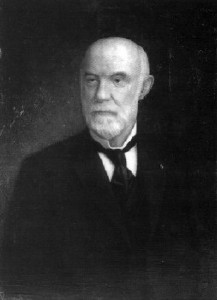
Walter Evans, Blackburn's opponent in the 1879 gubernatorial election

Returning to Louisville, Blackburn was fêted at the Galt House hotel. For weeks, receptions were held in his honor, gifts of appreciation poured in from across the state and region, and he was hailed as the "Hero of Hickman". It was against this backdrop that he resumed his gubernatorial campaign in November 1878. Two other men also sought the Democratic gubernatorial nomination: Lieutenant Governor John C. Underwood and former Congressman Thomas Laurens Jones. Before the yellow fever outbreak, Underwood had been the favorite, but public sentiment had turned in Blackburn's favor after his service to the people of Hickman. Underwood questioned whether Blackburn's medical background had adequately prepared him to be the state's chief executive; he also mounted a failed legal challenge that claimed Blackburn had not met the constitutional state residency requirement of seven years. In late March 1879, however, Underwood determined that he would not be able to overcome the "avalanche" of support for Blackburn and withdrew his candidacy. At the May 1 Democratic nominating convention, Blackburn was nominated by an overwhelming majority—935 delegates to the convention voted for him compared to just 22 for Jones.

Due to ill health, Blackburn could not take an active part in the campaign. He sought relief from his ailments at Crab Orchard Springs, while much of the campaign oratory was delivered on his behalf by fellow Democrats Boyd Winchester, Parker Watkins Hardin, W. C. P. Breckinridge, and others. Republicans, who had nominated Walter Evans, had fewer speakers with which to canvass the state, and were at a decided disadvantage. Democrats attacked the administrations of Republican Presidents Ulysses S. Grant and Rutherford B. Hayes, cited the alleged abuses perpetrated in the South by Carpetbaggers and Scalawags, and leveled charges that Republicans favored capitalists over the state's working class. Republican orators, led by William O'Connell Bradley, charged Democrats with financial extravagance, citing a $3 million surplus in the state treasury in 1865 compared with a $1 million debt in 1878. Bradley claimed that Democrats had maintained their power in the state through gerrymandering election districts. He cited poor conditions at the state penitentiary and inadequate funding of public education as evidence of Democratic mismanagement of the state.

In late May 1879, the Republican-leaning Cincinnati Gazette reported on Blackburn's alleged plot to infect northern cities with yellow fever during the Civil War, apparently the first time the incident had been reported in Kentucky. The newspaper formed a special department for the sole purpose of investigating the claims against Blackburn and published a daily column in which it related the department's findings. In the wake of the Gazette's investigation, other Northern newspapers, including the Canton Repository, Cleveland Herald, and Philadelphia Press, derided Kentuckians for even considering the election of Blackburn (who they nicknamed "Dr. Blackvomit"). The scandal gained more traction nationally than in Kentucky. Blackburn did not respond to the accusations, and Kentucky Republicans barely made mention of it, knowing that the northern press in general and the Cincinnati Gazette in particular were widely distrusted in the state. Kentucky newspaper editor Henry Watterson opined that most Kentuckians already knew about Blackburn's Civil War activities and either explicitly approved of them or were apathetic about events that had occurred a decade and a half earlier.

In the general election, Blackburn defeated Evans by a vote of 125,790 (56%) to 81,882 (36%), the largest Democratic margin of victory in a decade. Greenback Party candidate C. W. Cook garnered 18,954 votes, approximately 8 percent of the total votes cast. These votes came mainly at the expense of Blackburn and the Democrats. Until the election of Ernie Fletcher in 2003, Blackburn would be the only physician elected governor of Kentucky.

=== Financial reform ===
Immediately after his election, Blackburn began planning ways to balance the state's budget. In his 1880 address to the legislature, Blackburn reported that since 1867, the state had spent three million dollars more than it had taken in. Previous administrations had paid for the excess by using money from the federal government for "war claims" by the state and money from the state's sinking fund. Further, an economic depression had lowered property values and the state legislature had, in response to public demand, lowered taxes, further shrinking government income. Blackburn forcefully asserted that the situation must be remedied.

In response to recommendations from the governor, the General Assembly enacted cost-saving reforms in the judicial system, including the abolition of criminal, chancery, and common pleas courts, dividing the state instead into 18 circuit court districts. The number of jurors required for certain cases was reduced, juror salaries were set at a fixed rate, and penalties were established for soliciting jury duty. Reimbursement amounts for transporting and caring for prisoners were capped to prevent inflation of costs by local law enforcement. Salaries of state officials were reduced by 20 percent. The state property tax was also increased from 40 to 45 cents per $100 of taxable property, and laws were strengthened to facilitate the collection of delinquent taxes.

=== Penal reform ===
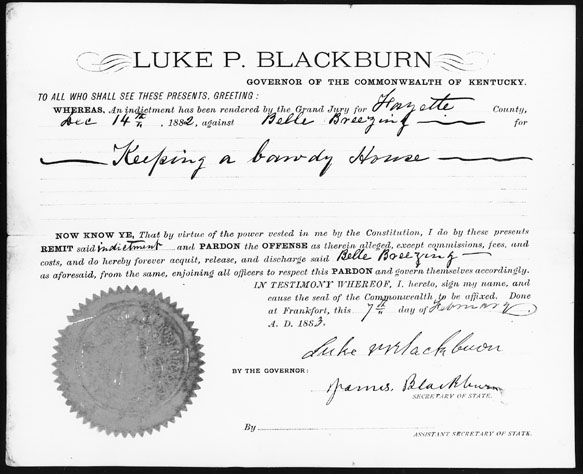
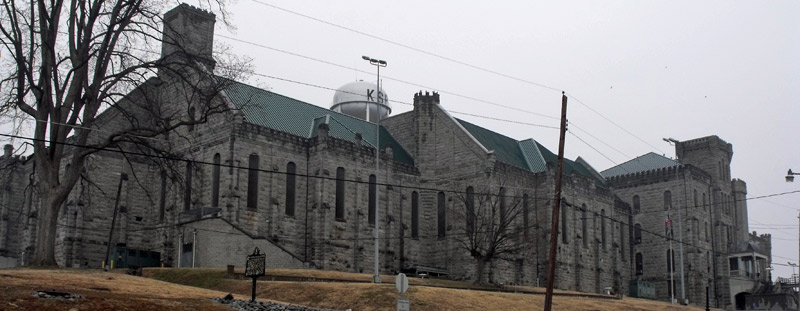
Top: A pardon signed by Blackburn; Bottom: The Kentucky State Penitentiary in Eddyville

Blackburn's primary focus was on reforms to the state's penal system. According to Blackburn, 953 prisoners were being held at the state penitentiary, although the structure only contained 780 cells. Conditions in the penitentiary were poor and resulted in many illnesses. One fifth of the state's prisoners suffered from pneumonia in 1875. When Blackburn became governor in 1879, the mortality rate of the almost one thousand inmates in the state penitentiary was over 7 percent. Scurvy caused by poor nutrition afflicted 75 percent of prisoners. Blackburn compared conditions at the penitentiary to the infamous Black Hole of Calcutta.

The poor conditions at the penitentiary were partially because the state leased management of the facility to private contractors, who frequently neglected prisoners' needs to cut costs. These contractors often provided benefits such as cheap laundry services and free meals to legislators to secure contracts and encourage them to ignore their abuse of prisoners. Blackburn called for the contract system to be replaced with a system of oversight by wardens employed by the state.

Before the General Assembly could act on his recommendations, Blackburn began granting pardons to relieve prison overcrowding. He particularly favored clemency for the incurably sick so they could go home to die with their families. During his term, Blackburn pardoned over one thousand individuals, earning him the nickname "Lenient Luke". The pardons were extremely unpopular with both the public and the Democratic political establishment. Several newspapers claimed that Blackburn sold pardons for two dollars apiece, though no evidence exists to support such an accusation.

In the 1880 legislative session, the General Assembly approved Blackburn's recommendation to construct a new state penitentiary in Eddyville. Legislators also responded to Blackburn's call for a warden system, authorizing the state to employ a warden, deputy warden, clerk, physician, and chaplain for the penitentiary. As a means of alleviating overcrowding, the Assembly allowed private contractors to lease convict labor from the penitentiary. These contractors would be responsible for feeding, clothing, housing, and caring for the prisoners in their charge. With no oversight of these contractors, however, prisoner abuses again occurred, including malnutrition, overwork, and beatings that often resulted in injury and death. Finally, legislators adopted, for the first time in state history, a rudimentary parole process. Due to his extensive record of reforming the state prison system, Blackburn is considered "the father of prison reforms in Kentucky".

=== Other reforms ===
Blackburn was also a zealous advocate for improved river navigation. He persuaded the legislature to apply a $100,000 allocation from the U.S. Congress to the improvement of navigation along the Kentucky River and gave concurrent jurisdiction over the Big Sandy and Licking Rivers to the federal government so they could be improved as well. Legislators also approved construction of a canal around the Cumberland Falls and improvements along the Tradewater River.

Blackburn's other accomplishments included establishing a state railroad commission and reorganizing the Kentucky Agricultural and Mechanical College. Kentucky A&M had been separated from Kentucky University under Blackburn's predecessor, James B. McCreary; Blackburn now advocated that it be put under the control of and supported by the state. This was done, and the rechartered institution, located at Lexington, became known commonly as the State College; in 1916, it was renamed the University of Kentucky.

== Later life and death ==
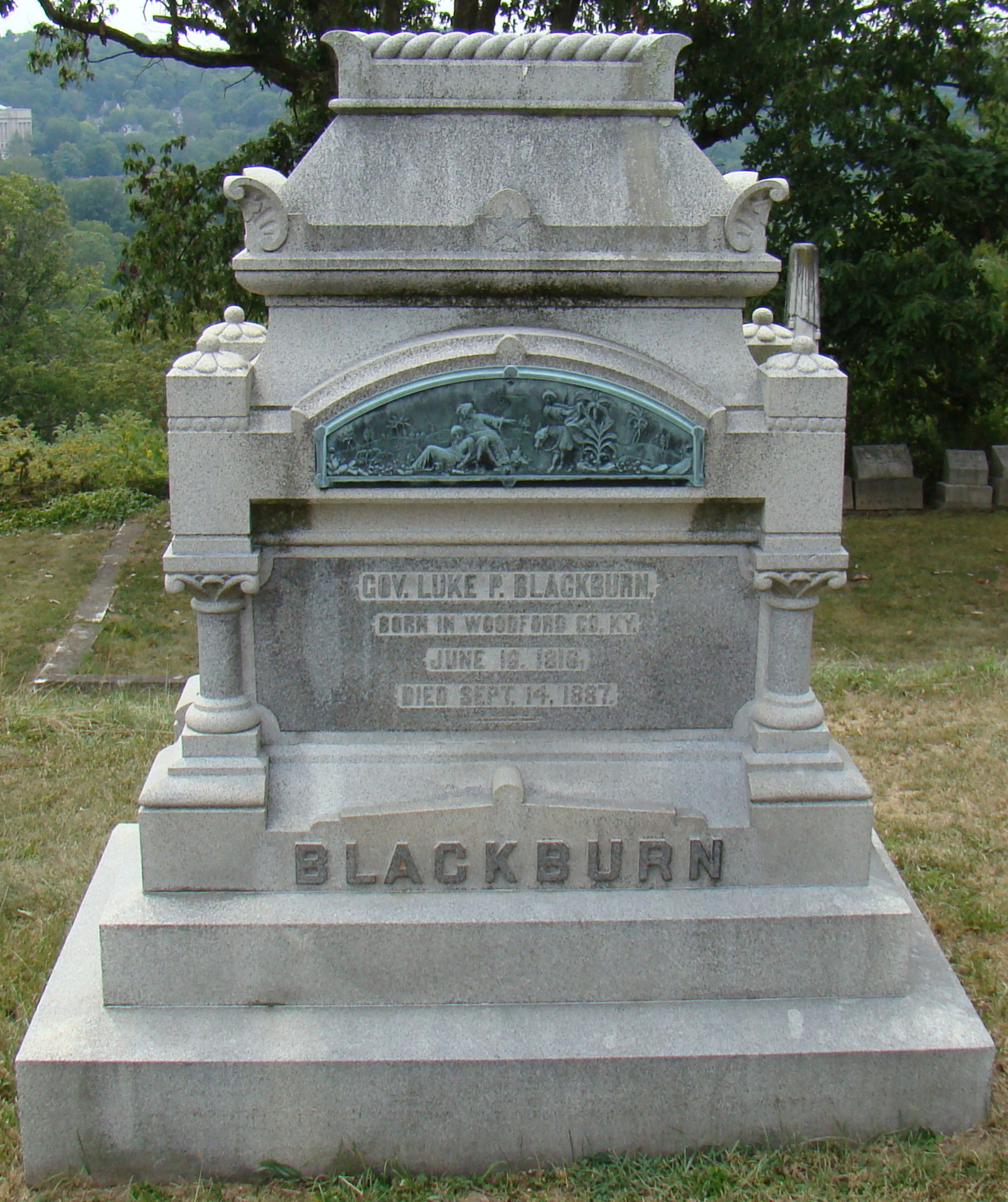
A bas-relief of the Good Samaritan adorns Blackburn's gravestone.

Despite his record of reforms, Democratic party leaders were largely displeased with Blackburn and his administration. They decried his record number of pardons and resented the fact that he did not give more consideration to party service and loyalty when appointing individuals to state jobs. Further, state newspapers noted a lack of eloquence by the governor, and this provided additional fodder for Blackburn's critics. Having announced at the beginning of his term that he would seek no further political office, Blackburn nonetheless attempted to defend his record in a speech at the 1883 Democratic nominating convention, but boos and shouts for him to sit down almost drowned out the address. Finally, Blackburn responded to the heckling by saying he expected to be criticized for his reforms, but that anyone who charged his administration with corruption was a "liar—a base and infamous liar". At this, the clamor from the crowd became deafening, and Blackburn was forced to end his address and take his seat.

Blackburn retired from public life at the expiration of his term. He briefly visited a Virginia resort before returning to his apartment at Louisville's Galt House and resuming his medical practice. While attending the 1883 National Conference of Charities, Blackburn was lauded for his prison reforms by guest speaker George Washington Cable. He also received praise at a similar conference in Saratoga Springs, New York, a few weeks later.

A few months after his return to Louisville, Blackburn opened a sanatorium near Cave Hill Cemetery. His failing health impeded the success of the endeavor, however, and in January 1887, he returned to the state capital of Frankfort—a city he regarded as his home—knowing that death was near. After a prolonged illness, he became comatose and died September 14, 1887. He was buried in Frankfort Cemetery.

On May 27, 1891, the state erected a monument over Blackburn's grave. The granite monument features a bas-relief depicting the Parable of the Good Samaritan. In 1972, the state opened the Blackburn Correctional Complex, a 400-acre (1.6 km^{2}) minimum security prison near Lexington named for Governor Blackburn.

== Notes ==
Party political offices
Preceded by James B. McCreary	Democratic nominee for Governor of Kentucky; 1879	Succeeded by J. Proctor Knott
Political offices
Preceded by James B. McCreary	Governor of Kentucky; 1879–1883	Succeeded by J. Proctor Knott
