= Blackburn Correctional Complex =

Coordinates: 38°06′40″N 84°32′11″W

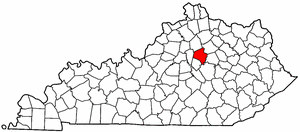

Location
- 3111 Spurr Rd; Lexington, KY 40511; United States

Information
- Type: Minimum security prison
- Opened: 1972
- Authority: Kentucky Department of Corrections
- Warden: Jesse Stack
- Staff: 128
- Enrollment: 594 (2006)
- Campus size: 456 acres (185 ha)
- Accreditation: American Correctional Association
- Budget: $6,000,000
- Website: https://corrections.ky.gov/Facilities/AI/BCC/Pages/default.aspx

Blackburn Correctional Complex (BCC) is a minimum-security state prison located near Lexington, Kentucky. It opened in 1972 and had a prison population of 594 as of 2007.

It is named for former Kentucky governor Luke P. Blackburn, who is known as the "father of prison reform in Kentucky."
