= John C. Underwood =

American politician

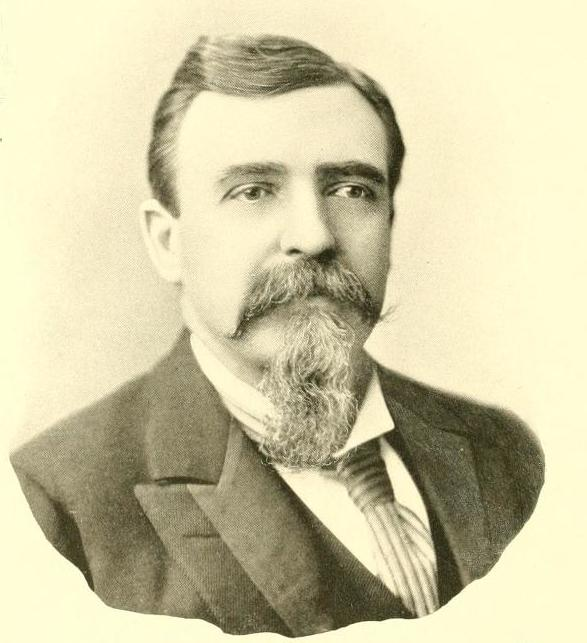

21st Lieutenant Governor of Kentucky
- In office August 31, 1875 – September 2, 1879
- Governor: James B. McCreary
- Preceded by: John G. Carlisle
- Succeeded by: James E. Cantrill

Personal details
- Born: John Cox Underwood; September 12, 1840 Georgetown, District of Columbia, U.S.
- Died: October 29, 1913 (aged 73) Manhattan, New York, U.S.

Military service
- Allegiance: Confederate States
- Branch: Army
- Years of service: 1862–1863
- Rank: Lieutenant Colonel
- Unit: Breckinridge's Division
- Wars: American Civil War

John Cox Underwood (September 12, 1840 – October 29, 1913) was an American engineer and journalist who served as the 21st lieutenant governor of Kentucky from 1875 to 1879.

== Early life and education ==
Underwood was born in Georgetown, District of Columbia, on September 12, 1840, the son of U.S. Representative Joseph Rogers Underwood (1791–1876) and his second wife, Elizabeth Threlkeld Cox (1818–1884). His grandfather John Cox (1775–1849) was the mayor of Georgetown (and a slaveholder) from 1823 until 1845, before it was annexed into Washington, D.C. He attended local private schools, then Rensselaer Polytechnic Institute in New York City, from which he received a civil engineering degree in 1862.

== American Civil War ==
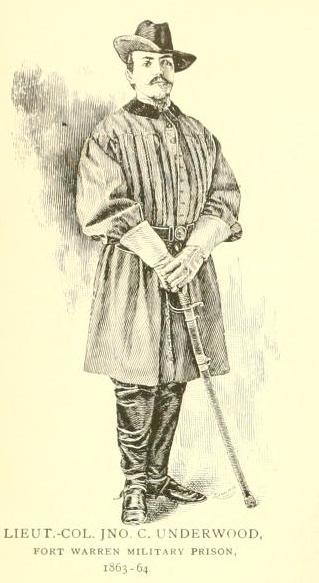
Underwood in uniform

After graduation, although his father was a Unionist, John Underwood enlisted in the Confederate States Army Engineer Corps, serving in Virginia and Tennessee. His uncle John Threlkeld Cox (1820–1886) was also a civil engineer and led several different Confederate cavalry brigades, mostly of Kentucky volunteers. Young John Underwood soon contracted typhoid fever, and was captured in 1863 at Tullahoma, Tennessee. Imprisoned in Cincinnati and Boston, he received a parole from President Abraham Lincoln.

== Political career ==
After the American Civil War, Underwood became Bowling Green's City Engineer, and designed Fountain Square Park. He also served as Bowling Green's mayor in 1870-71 and edited newspapers in Bowling Green, Cincinnati and Louisville. He was a member of the Odd Fellows, and was elected Lieutenant Governor under Governor James B. McCreary. However, his bid to become Kentucky's governor in 1879 failed, and Luke P. Blackburn of Louisville received the nomination.

== Later life ==
For the rest of his life, Underwood was devoted to genealogy and the Lost Cause of the Confederacy through the United Confederate Veterans. He raised money to construct a Confederate Memorial at Oak Woods Cemetery in Chicago, Illinois to commemorate the Confederate prisoners who died at Camp Douglas, and whose remains were exhumed and moved there after closure of the previous cemetery and expansion of Grant Park during urban renewal following the Great Chicago Fire of 1871.

Underwood then agreed to raise money for a Confederate monument in Richmond, Virginia. However, the project was embroiled in legal controversies which ruined him financially and physically. In 1910, oil portraits of many of the twenty Confederate generals he had commissioned from E.F. Andrews were auctioned by a Covington, Kentucky warehouse to pay storage fees, and most ended up in Virginia. By that time, Underwood's wife had died and he lived in Manhattan, New York and described himself in the census as an author.

Underwood died on October 29, 1913, in Manhattan, New York. His remains were returned to Kentucky for burial in the family plot at Fairview cemetery in Bowling Green.

== Legacy ==
Western Kentucky University has several of his commissioned paintings and maintains some of his papers (as well as those of his Unionist father and paternal uncle), including letters available online.

== Personal life ==
He married Drucilla Duncan Underwood (1844–1905) and they had two daughters, Helen Underwood Hine (1873–1958), and her sister Drucilla Underwood Grant.

Political offices
Preceded by John G. Carlisle	Lieutenant Governor of Kentucky; 1875–1879	Succeeded by James E. Cantrill
