= 1879 Kentucky gubernatorial election =

- August 4, 1879
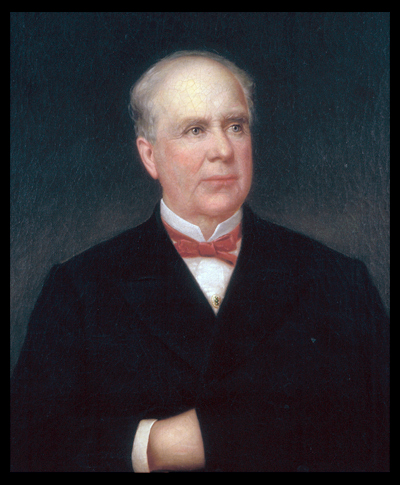

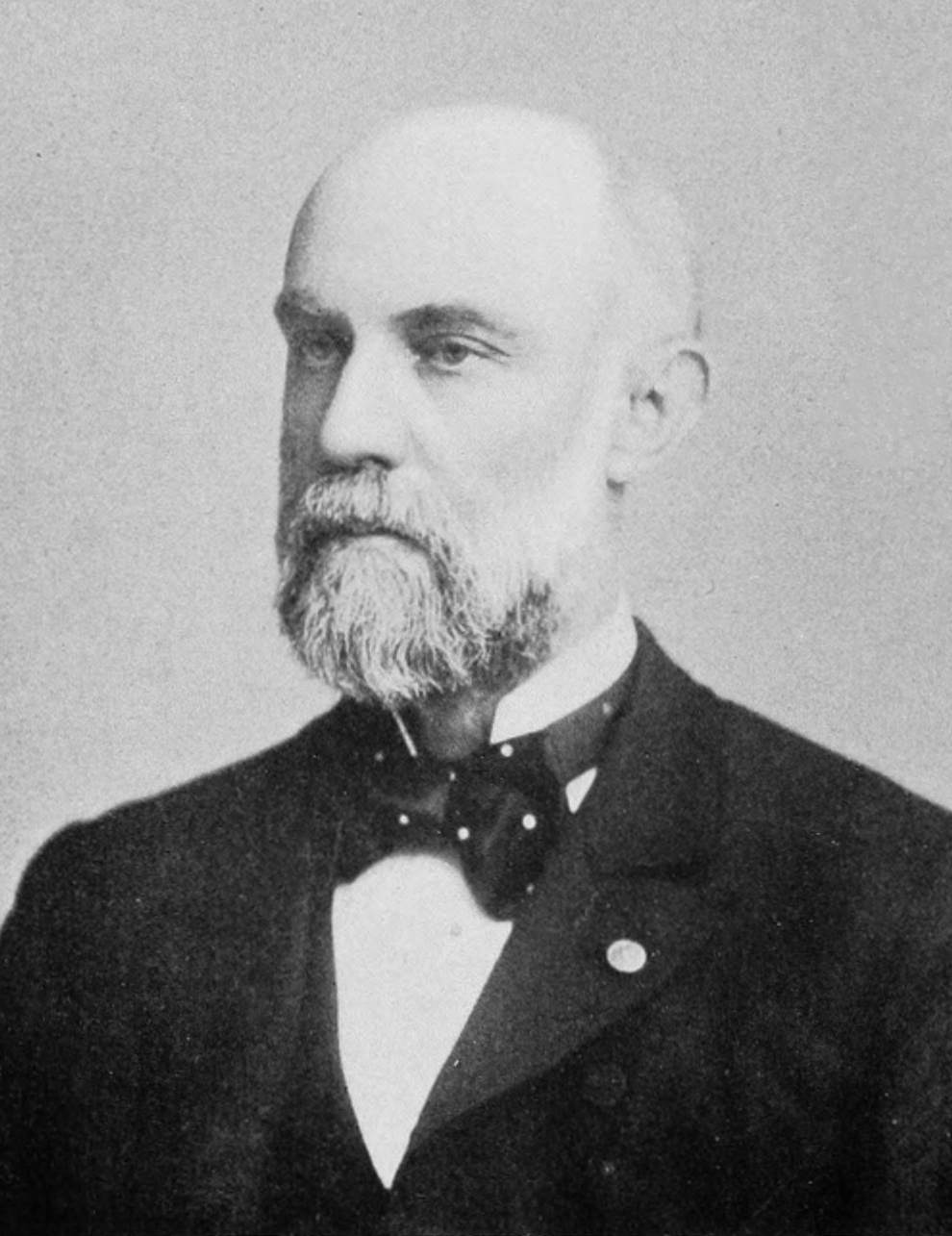

Nominee	Luke P. Blackburn	Walter Evans	Charles W. Cook
Party	Democratic	Republican	Greenback
Popular vote	125,399	81,881	18,954
Percentage	55.43%	36.19%	8.38%
- County results Blackburn: 30–40% 40–50% 50–60% 60–70% 70–80% 80–90% >90% Evans: 30–40% 40–50% 50–60% 60–70% 70–80% Cook: 40–50%
Governor before election
James B. McCreary
Democratic
Elected Governor
Luke P. Blackburn
Democratic

The 1879 Kentucky gubernatorial election was held on August 4, 1879. Democratic nominee Luke P. Blackburn defeated Republican nominee Walter Evans with 55.43% of the vote.

== General election ==
=== Candidates ===
Major party candidates

- Luke P. Blackburn, Democratic
- Walter Evans, Republican

Other candidates

- Charles W. Cook, Greenback

=== Results ===
1879 Kentucky gubernatorial election
Party	Candidate	Votes	%	±%
Democratic	Luke P. Blackburn	125,399	55.43%	−2.88%
Republican	Walter Evans	81,881	36.19%	−5.50%
Greenback	Charles W. Cook	18,954	8.38%	N/A
Majority		43,518	19.24%	
Turnout				
Democratic hold		Swing		
