= Albert S. Willis =

American politician and diplomat (1843–1897)

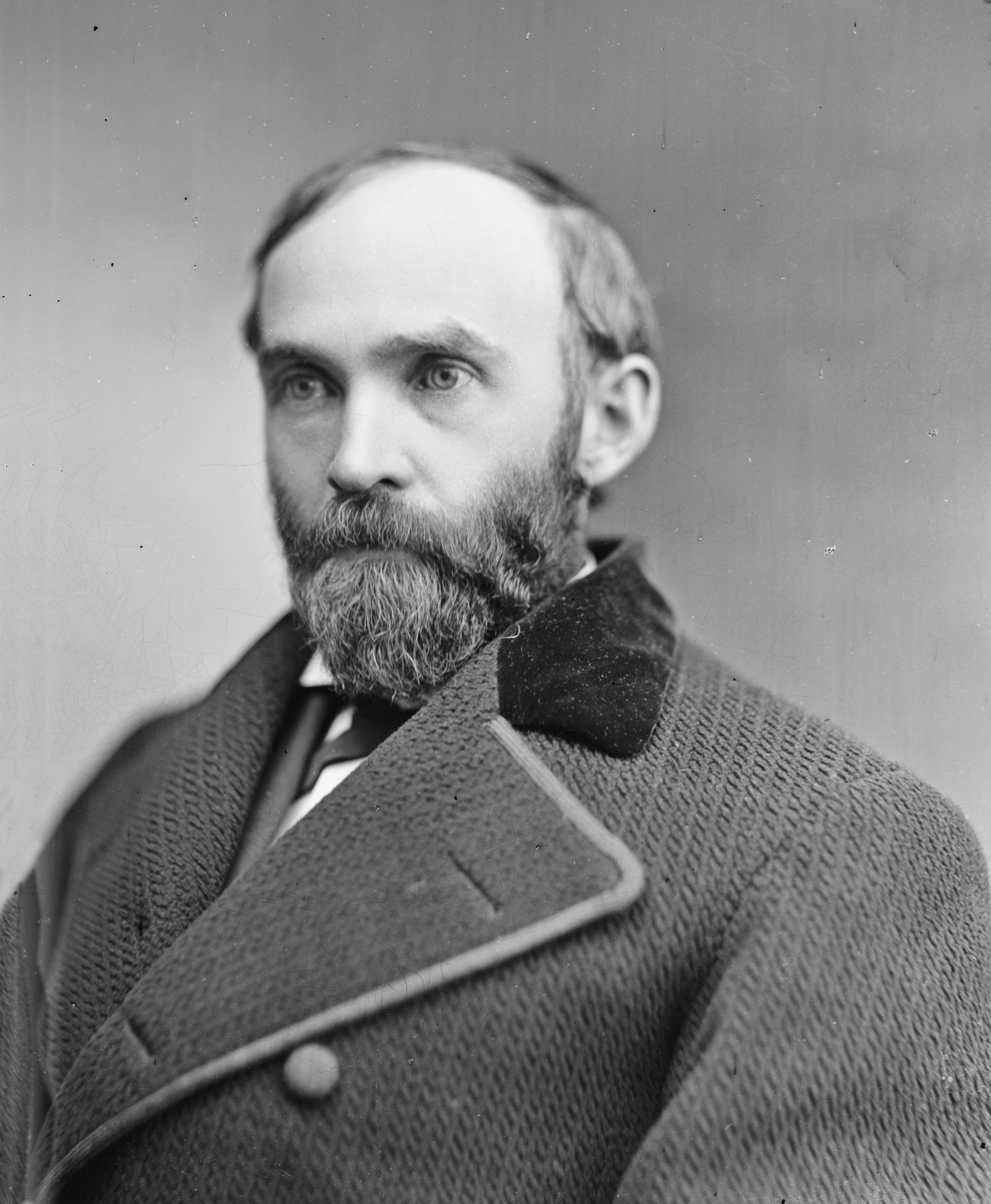
- Willis, 1865–1880

United States Ambassador to Hawaii
- In office November 7, 1893 – January 6, 1897
- President: Grover Cleveland
- Preceded by: James Henderson Blount
- Succeeded by: Harold M. Sewall

Member of the U.S. House of Representatives from Kentucky's 5th district
- In office March 4, 1877 – March 3, 1887
- Preceded by: Henry Watterson
- Succeeded by: Asher G. Caruth

Personal details
- Born: Albert Shelby Willis; January 22, 1843 Shelbyville, Kentucky, U.S.
- Died: January 6, 1897 (aged 53) Honolulu, Hawaii, U.S.
- Resting place: Cave Hill Cemetery; Louisville, Kentucky, U.S.
- Party: Democratic
- Education: University of Louisville School of Law
- Profession: Politician, lawyer

Albert Shelby Willis (January 22, 1843 – January 6, 1897) was a United States representative from Kentucky and a minister to Hawaii.

== Life ==
Born in Shelbyville, Kentucky, Willis attended the common schools and graduated from the Louisville Male High School in 1860. He taught school for four years before graduating from the University of Louisville School of Law in 1866. He was admitted to the bar and commenced the practice of law in Louisville. He served as prosecuting attorney for Jefferson County from 1874 to 1877.

Willis was elected as a Democrat to the Forty-fifth and to the four succeeding Congresses (March 4, 1877 – March 3, 1887). He served as chairman of the Committee on Rivers and Harbors during the Forty-eighth and Forty-ninth Congresses. He was an unsuccessful candidate for renomination in 1886.

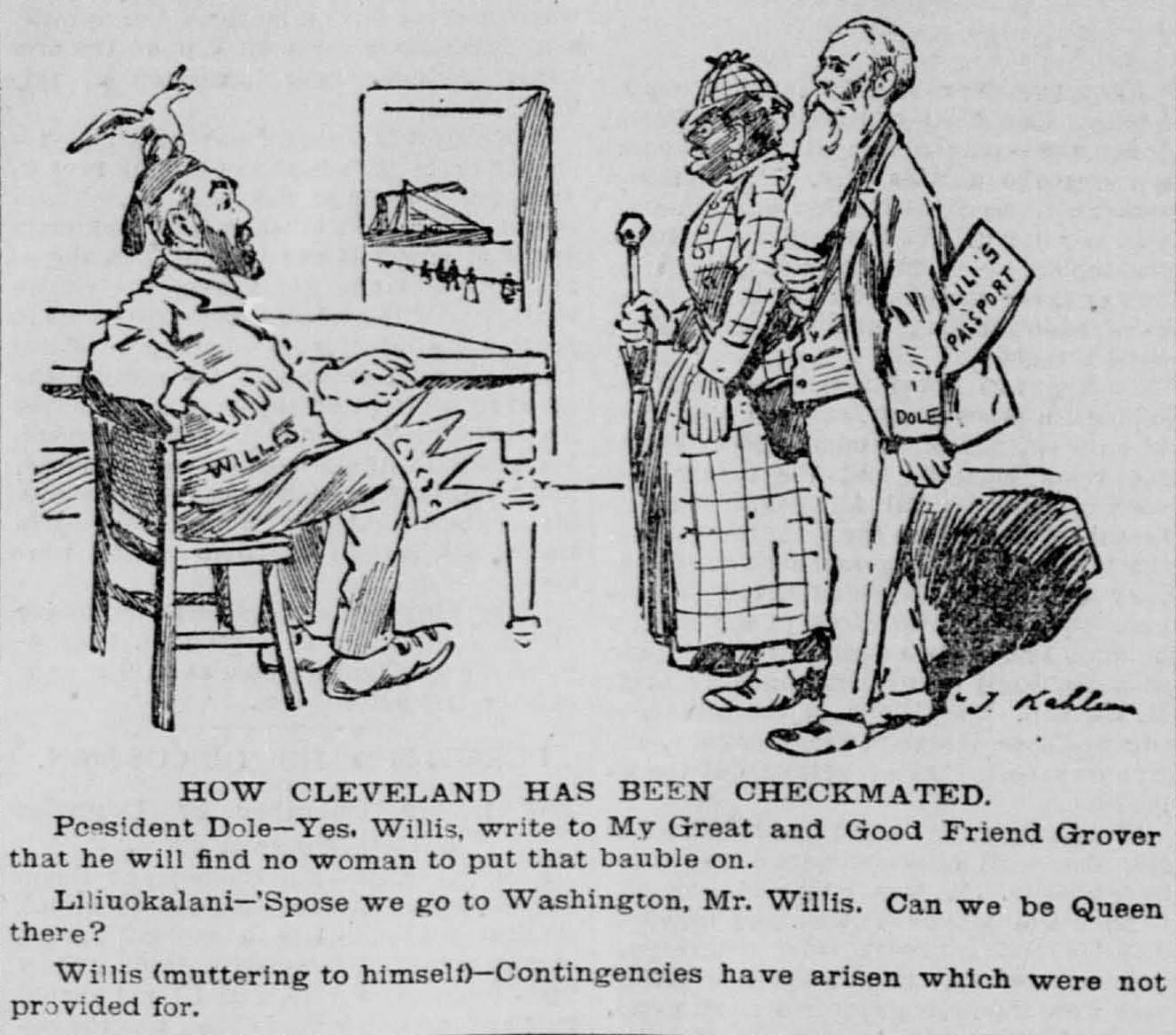
An 1893 editorial cartoon with Willis, Queen Liliʻuokalani, and President Sanford B. Dole by the newspaper The Morning Call

He resumed the practice of law before being appointed Minister to Hawaii by President Grover Cleveland in 1893. Willis was sent to Hawaii on a secret mission to meet with deposed Queen Liliʻuokalani and obtain a promise of amnesty for those involved in the overthrow of the Kingdom of Hawaii if Cleveland restored her to the throne. Willis reported to the Secretary of State in Washington that she was intent on killing the culprits. There was a dispute: Willis said the Queen said "beheading"; she later said she used "execute."

Finally, the Queen reversed herself and told Willis she could issue an amnesty. On December 18, 1893, Willis demanded on behalf of Cleveland to dissolve the Provisional Government of Hawaii and restore the Queen to power. Willis' mission was a failure when Sanford B. Dole sent a written reply declining the surrender of his authority to the deposed queen. President Cleveland then referred the matter to Congress, which commissioned the Morgan Report, which exonerated the U.S. minister and peacekeepers from taking any part in the Hawaiian Revolution. Following the Morgan Report, Cleveland reversed his stance, rebuffed the queen's further pleas for interference, and maintained normal diplomatic relations with both the Provisional Government and its successor the Republic of Hawaii.

Willis served as Minister to Hawaii until his death in Honolulu on January 6, 1897. An elaborate state funeral was held for him in the ʻIolani Palace (temporarily renamed the Executive Building). He was interred in Cave Hill Cemetery, Louisville, Kentucky.

U.S. House of Representatives
Preceded by Henry Watterson	Member of the U.S. House of Representatives from Kentucky's 5th congressional district March 4, 1877 – March 3, 1887	Succeeded by Asher G. Caruth
Diplomatic posts
Preceded by James Henderson Blount	United States Minister to Hawaii; 1893–1897	Succeeded by Harold M. Sewall
