= Bland Ballard (judge) =

American judge (1819–1879)

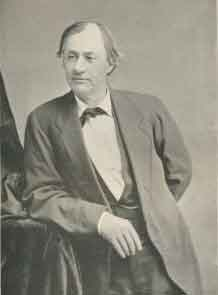

Judge of the United States District Court for the District of Kentucky
- In office October 16, 1861 – July 29, 1879
- Appointed by: Abraham Lincoln
- Preceded by: Thomas Bell Monroe
- Succeeded by: William Hercules Hays

Personal details
- Born: Bland Ballard; September 4, 1819 Shelby County, Kentucky
- Died: July 29, 1879 (aged 59) Louisville, Kentucky
- Resting place: Cave Hill Cemetery; Louisville, Kentucky
- Relatives: Bland Ballard (uncle)
- Education: Transylvania University read law

Bland Ballard (September 4, 1819 – July 29, 1879) was a United States district judge of the United States District Court for the District of Kentucky.

== Education and career ==
Born on September 4, 1819, in Shelby County, Kentucky, Ballard received his basic education at Shelby College in Shelbyville, Kentucky, and Hanover College in Hanover, Indiana. Ballard read law in the office of Judge James Turner Morehead to enter the Kentucky Bar in 1840, and later graduated from the law department of Transylvania University in 1846. He entered private practice in Shelbyville in 1840. He continued private practice in Louisville, Kentucky from 1840 to 1861, in partnership with Henry Pirtle, who later served as Chancellor of the Louisville Chancery Court. Ballard served as a city councilman of Louisville. Ballard was connected with the business interests of Louisville and took an active interest in the city and its institutions.

== Federal judicial service ==
Ballard received a recess appointment from President Abraham Lincoln on October 16, 1861, to a seat on the United States District Court for the District of Kentucky vacated by Judge Thomas Bell Monroe, who had resigned to take a seat in the Congress of the Confederate States. He was nominated to the same position by President Lincoln on December 9, 1861. He was confirmed by the United States Senate on January 22, 1862, and received his commission the same day. His service terminated on July 29, 1879, due to his death in Louisville. He was buried in Cave Hill Cemetery in Louisville.

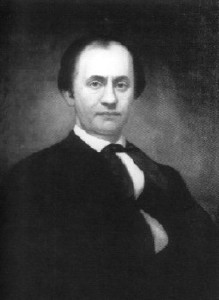
Ballard's 1861 court portrait

=== Tenure on the court ===
Ballard quickly reorganized the court and insured that the federal court system in Kentucky would continue without disruption. "His district was responsible for more indictments for treason and conspiracy than perhaps any other" and he was "regarded as fair-minded and guided by the law, not prejudice. He was opposed to slavery and strongly supported the Union". The years immediately following the Civil War saw a great increase in cases filed in the district court from questions growing out of the war, especially the internal revenue law and bankruptcy law.

=== Notable case ===
Ballard oversaw the trial and conviction of two White men who slaughtered and mutilated a family of African Americans before it was appealed to the United States Supreme Court in Bylew v. United States.

== Other service ==
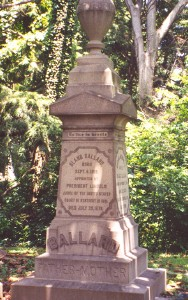
Tombstone of Bland Ballard in the Cave Hill Cemetery, Louisville, Kentucky.

In addition to his duties as district judge, Ballard served as president of the Kentucky National Bank and the Cave Hill Cemetery Company and was active in various civic organizations.

== Family ==
Ballard was the son of James and Susannah (Cox) Ballard and nephew of the Kentucky pioneer Bland Ballard. On December 16, 1846, Ballard married Miss Sarah McDowell. They had five children.

Legal offices
Preceded by Thomas Bell Monroe	Judge of the United States District Court for the District of Kentucky; 1861–1879	Succeeded by William Hercules Hays
