= Oak Grove Cemetery (Bath, Maine) =

Historic Cemetery in Bath, Sagadahoc County, Maine, US

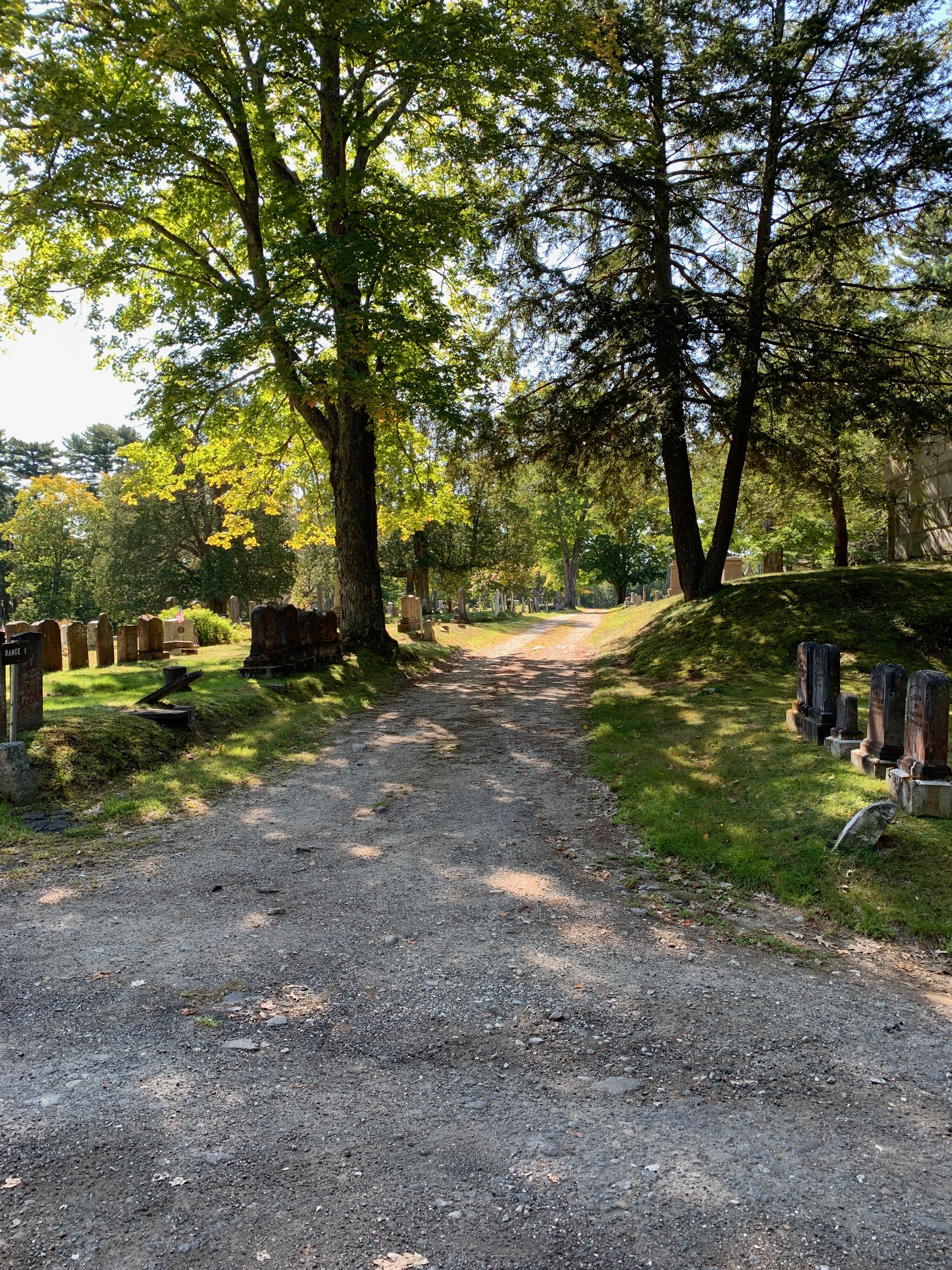
- Range 1 at Oak Grove Cemetery, looking south
- Interactive map of Oak Grove Cemetery

Details
- Location: Oak Grove Avenue; Bath, Maine
- Country: United States
- Coordinates: 43°55′28″N 69°49′50″W
- Type: Public municipal
- Owned by: City of Bath
- Find a Grave: Oak Grove Cemetery

Oak Grove Cemetery (originally the Sewall Burying Ground) is an historic cemetery located in Bath, Maine. Its oldest headstone bears the date January 22, 1777. The cemetery was purchased from the heirs of Charles Sewall in 1872.

The cemetery is situated on Oak Grove Avenue near Maple Grove Cemetery. These cemeteries are considered two of Bath's "big three", the other one being Calvary Cemetery, just north of downtown.

A portion of the cemetery close to Oak Grove Avenue is given to the Jewish Beth Israel Cemetery. It contains 96 burial spaces.

Whiskeag Trail traverses a portion of the cemetery, crossing Old Brunswick Road at its southern boundary. It crosses the cemetery's bridge that spans the Rockland Branch railroad.

== Notable burials ==
- Emma Eames, opera singer and actress
- Peter A. Garland, United States Congressman
- Thomas W. Hyde, Union Army colonel and Medal of Honor recipient
- Arthur Sewall, politician and ship builder
- Harold Sewall, politician; son of Arthur
- Sumner Sewall, governor of Maine; grandson of Arthur

== Gallery ==
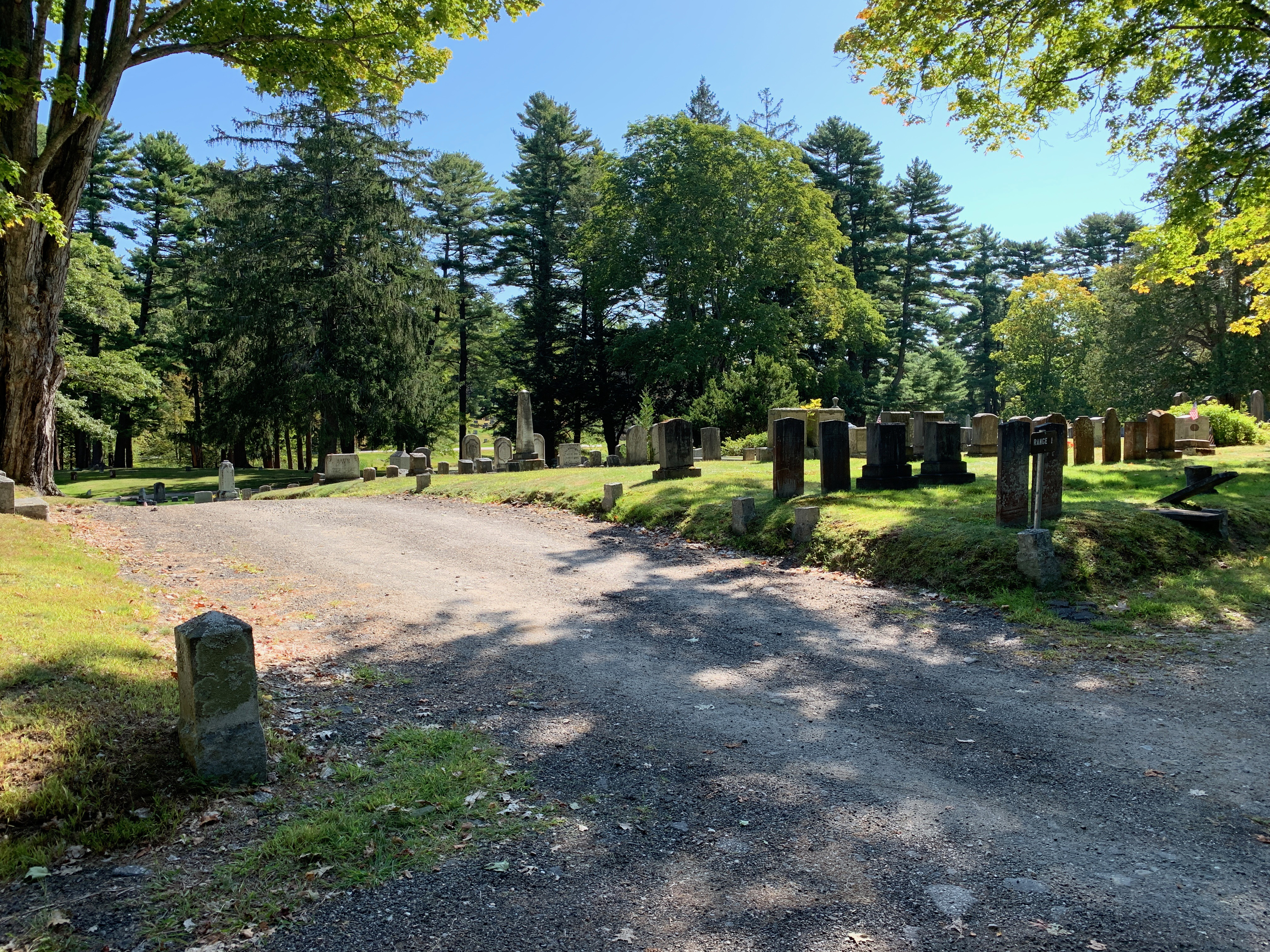
Looking east, Maple Grove Cemetery can be seen across Oak Grove Avenue

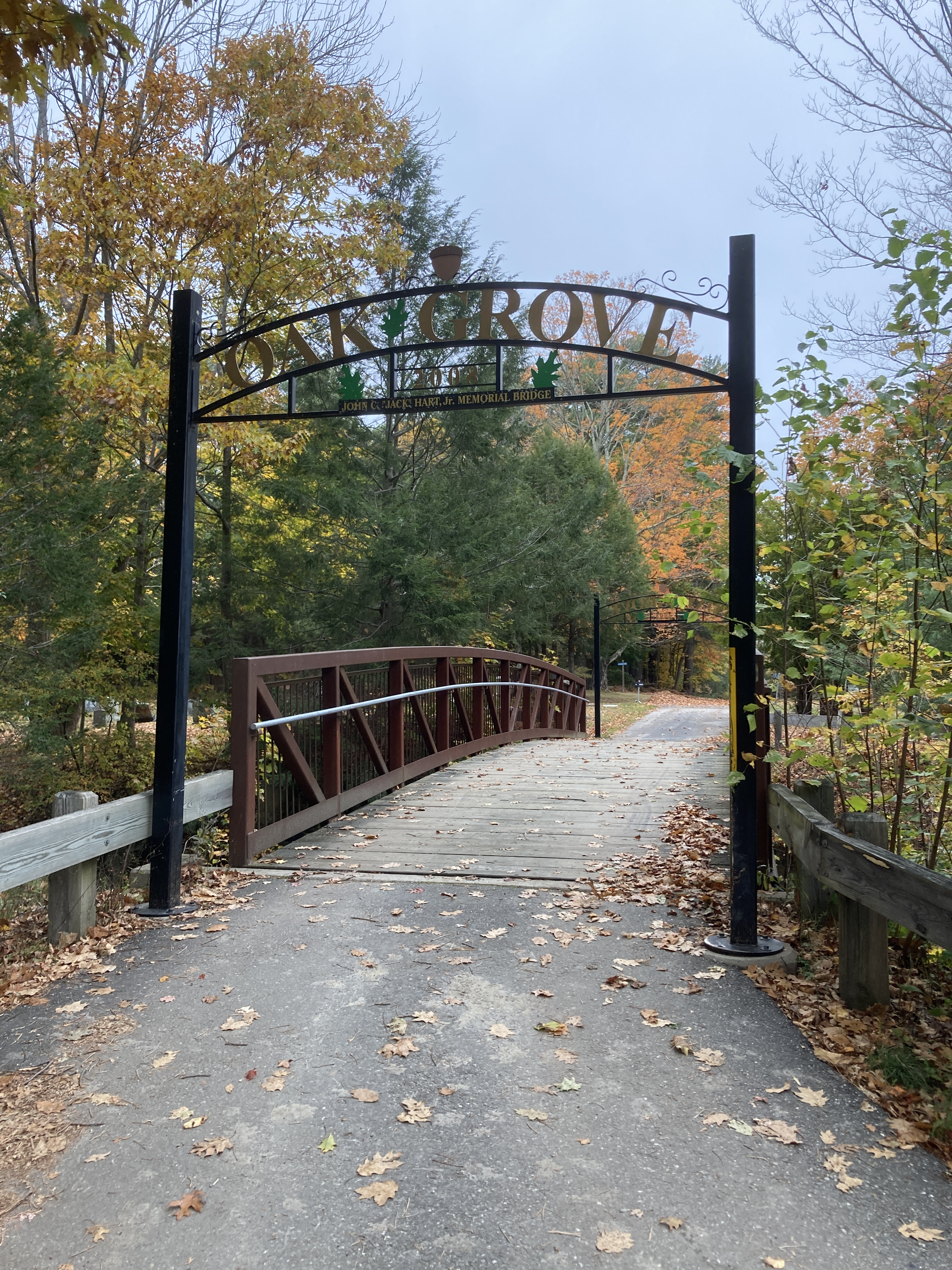
The cemetery's bridge crossing the Rockland Branch railroad
