= Peter A. Garland =

American politician (1923–2005)

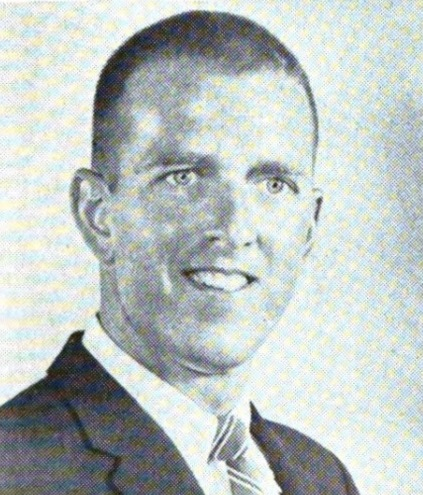

Member of the U.S. House of Representatives from Maine's 1st district
- In office January 3, 1961 – January 3, 1963
- Preceded by: James C. Oliver
- Succeeded by: Stanley R. Tupper

Personal details
- Born: Peter Adams Garland; June 16, 1923 Boston, Massachusetts, US
- Died: January 26, 2005 (aged 81) Brunswick, Maine, US
- Resting place: Oak Grove Cemetery in Bath, Maine
- Party: Republican
- Education: Bowdoin College

Peter Adams Garland (June 16, 1923 – January 26, 2005) was an American businessman and military veteran who served as a one-term U.S. representative from Maine, serving from 1961 to 1963.

== Early life ==
Garland was born in Boston, Massachusetts. He attended Saco public schools and the Hotchkiss School in Lakeville, Connecticut. He graduated from Bowdoin College, Brunswick, Maine, in 1945.

== Career ==
Garland was an officer and director of Garland Manufacturing Co. in Saco, Maine, and Snocraft Co. in Norway, Maine.

=== Military service ===
He served as an enlisted man in the United States Air Corps from 1943 to 1946.

=== Business career ===
director of the New England Council and Associated Industries of Maine from 1955 to 1957. Garland also served as a member of the Saco Superintending School Committee from 1952 to 1954.

He served as mayor of Saco from 1956 to 1959, and was a New England field adviser for the Small Business Administration from 1958 to 1960.

=== Congress ===
Garland was elected as a Republican to the Eighty-seventh Congress (January 3, 1961 – January 3, 1963). He was an unsuccessful candidate for renomination to the Eighty-eighth Congress in 1962, and an unsuccessful candidate to the Ninetieth Congress in 1966.

=== After Congress ===
Garland was a municipal town manager for Gorham, Maine from 1967 to 1969, a marketing director for an engineering firm from 1970 to 1972, and a city manager for Claremont, New Hampshire from 1972 to 1973. Additional public service included his being a community manager for Ocean Pines, Ocean City, Maryland from 1973 to 1974, a town manager for Searsport, Maine from 1974 to 1981, and a city manager for Bath, Maine from 1981 to 1989.

== Death and burial ==
Garland died on January 26, 2005, in Brunswick, Maine. He is interred at Oak Grove Cemetery in Bath, Maine.

U.S. House of Representatives
Preceded by James C. Oliver	Member of the U.S. House of Representatives from Maine's 1st congressional district 1961–1963	Succeeded by Stanley R. Tupper
