= John W. Barr =

American judge

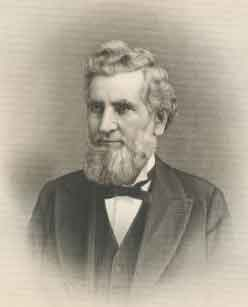

Judge of the United States District Court for the District of Kentucky
- In office April 16, 1880 – February 21, 1899
- Appointed by: Rutherford B. Hayes
- Preceded by: William Hercules Hays
- Succeeded by: Walter Evans

Personal details
- Born: John Watson Barr; December 17, 1826 Versailles, Kentucky
- Died: December 31, 1907 (aged 81) Louisville, Kentucky
- Resting place: Cave Hill Cemetery; Louisville, Kentucky
- Party: Whig; Democratic; Republican
- Education: Transylvania University

Military service
- Allegiance: (United States) Union
- Branch/service: Home Guard
- Years of service: 1861–1865
- Rank: Adjutant general
- Unit: Louisville brigade
- Battles/wars: American Civil War

John Watson Barr (December 17, 1826 – December 31, 1907) was a United States district judge of the United States District Court for the District of Kentucky.

== Education and career ==
Barr was born in Versailles, Kentucky on December 17, 1826. He was the son of William and Ann (Watson) Barr. His father was a merchant who worked in both Versailles and Louisville, Kentucky. Barr received his early education from private tutors and private schools in Woodford County, Kentucky. He then matriculated to Transylvania University to study law. Upon his graduation in 1847 he commenced practice in Versailles. In 1854, he moved to Louisville and formed a law firm with Joseph B. Kinkead. After eight years, the two dissolved the partnership by mutual consent, but remained friends. Barr continued in private practice until 1864, when he formed a new law firm with John Kemp Goodloe. Barr had begun advocating the gradual abolition of slavery as early as 1849. When the Civil War commenced, he helped organize the Kentucky Home Guard and served as adjutant general of the Louisville brigade. He was also involved in the organization of several Union regiments in Kentucky. After the war, Barr returned to his law practice. In 1868, Alexander Pope Humphrey joined the firm, which continued until Barr's appointment to a federal judgeship in 1880.

== Public career ==
Like his father, Barr was associated with the Whig Party in his early life. Following the dissolution of the Whig Party, he joined the Democratic Party. After the formation of the Republican Party, he fervently adhered to that party. From 1868 to 1870, Barr served as president of the Board of Louisville Sinking Fund Commissioners and served several terms on the Louisville City Council. For twenty years, he was director of the Bank of Kentucky.

== Federal judicial service ==
On April 9, 1880, President Rutherford B. Hayes nominated Barr to the United States District Court for the District of Kentucky, replacing Judge William Hercules Hays. He was confirmed by the United States Senate on April 16, 1880, and received his commission the same day. Barr retired on February 21, 1899.

== Death ==
Barr died on December 31, 1907, in Louisville at age 81 and was buried in Cave Hill Cemetery in Louisville.

== Family ==
On November 23, 1859, Barr married Susan P. Rogers. The couple had seven children – John W. Barr Jr., Anna W. Barr, Caroline H. Barr, Susan R. Barr, Josephine P. Barr, Elise R. Barr, and Jason Rogers Barr. The family attended College Street Presbyterian Church.

== Sources ==
- Biographical Cyclopedia of the Commonwealth of Kentucky. Chicago, Illinois: J.M. Gresham Company. 1896.
- "John Watson Barr (1826–1907)". History of the Sixth Circuit. United States Court of Appeals for the Sixth Circuit. Archived from the original on 2011-06-06.

Legal offices
Preceded by William Hercules Hays	Judge of the United States District Court for the District of Kentucky; 1880–1899	Succeeded by Walter Evans
