= List of federal judges appointed by Rutherford B. Hayes =

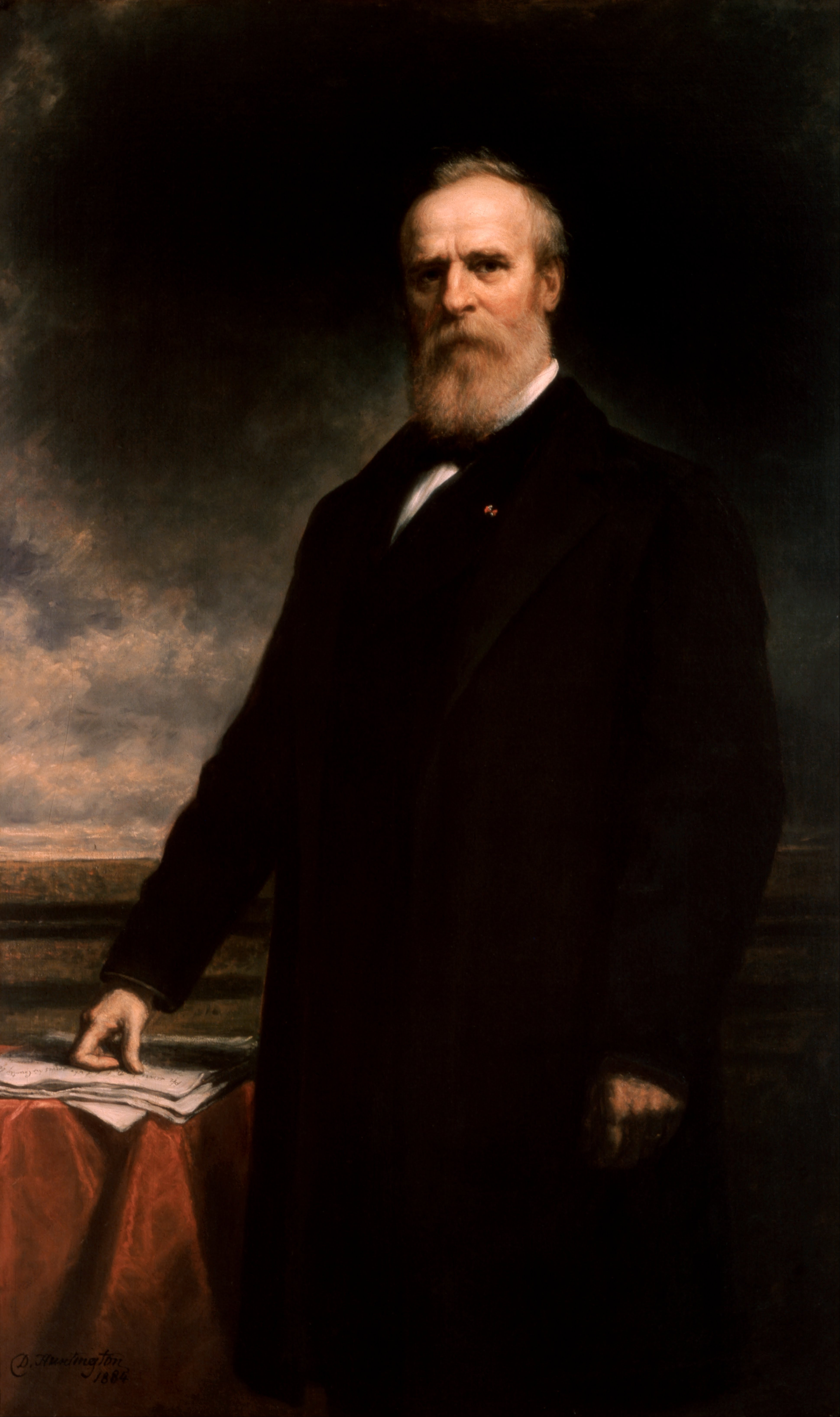
President Rutherford B. Hayes.

Following is a list of all Article III United States federal judges appointed by President Rutherford B. Hayes during his presidency. In total Hayes made 22 Article III federal judicial appointments, including 2 Justices to the Supreme Court of the United States, 4 judges to the United States circuit courts, and 16 judges to the United States district courts.

Hayes appointed 2 judges to the United States Court of Claims, an Article I tribunal.

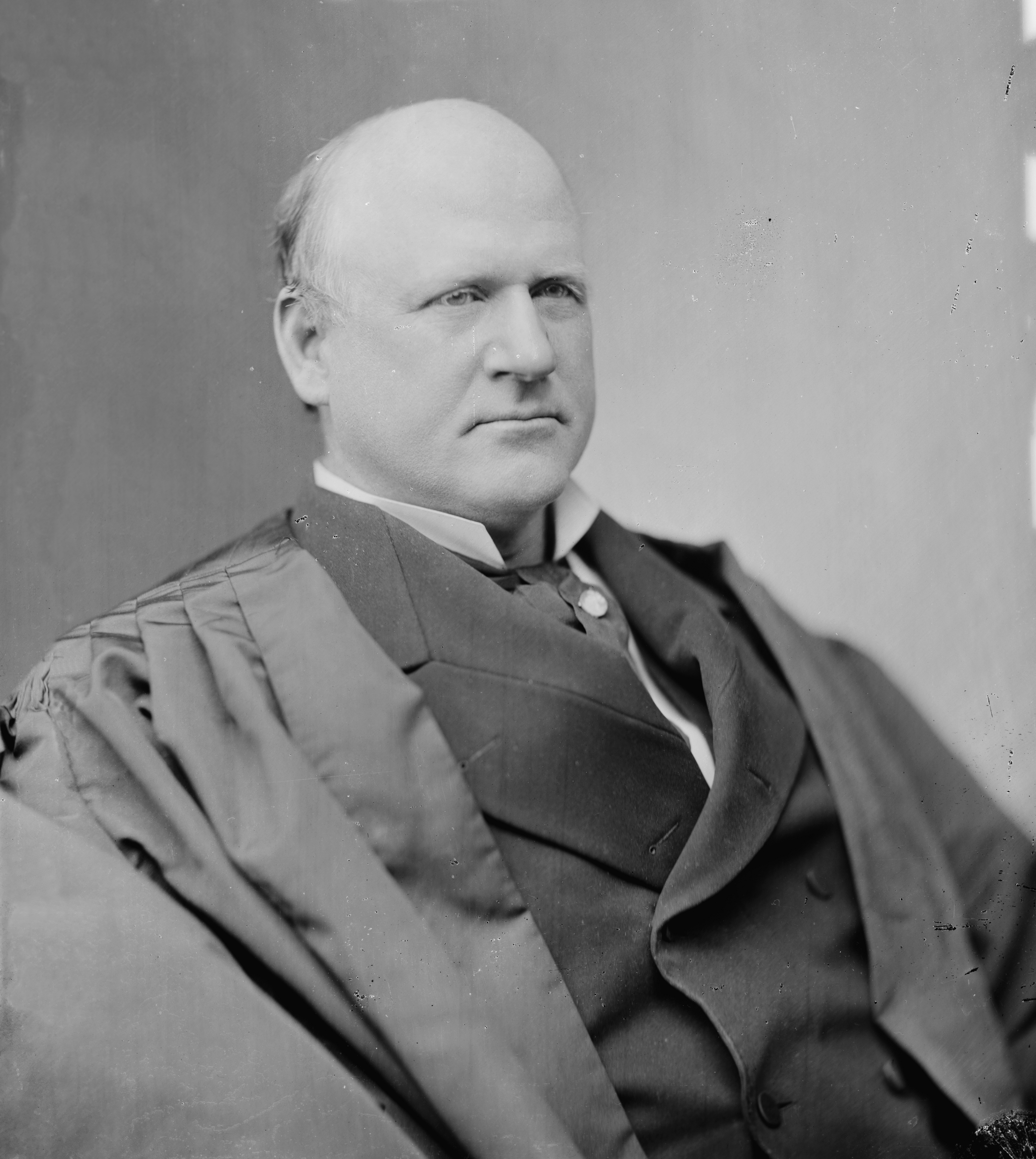
Hayes' most notable judicial appointment was Supreme Court Justice John Marshall Harlan.

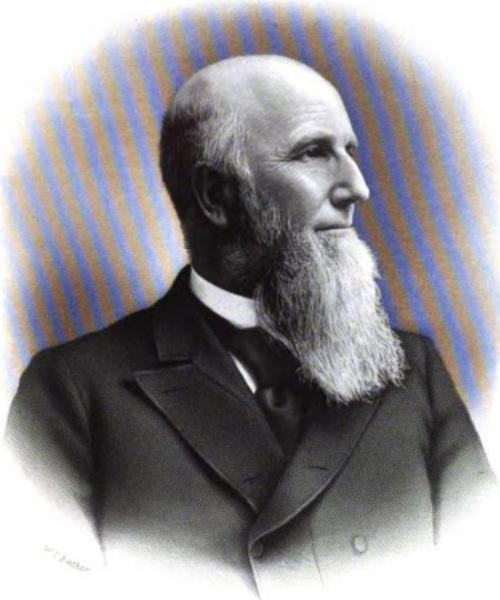
Hoyt Henry Wheeler, highly regarded as a Vermont district court judge.

== United States Supreme Court justices ==
#	Justice	Seat	State	Former justice	Nomination date	Confirmation date	Began active service	Ended active service
1	John Marshall Harlan	8	Kentucky	David Davis	October 16, 1877	November 29, 1877	November 29, 1877	October 14, 1911
2	William Burnham Woods	3	Ohio	William Strong	December 15, 1880	December 21, 1880	December 21, 1880	May 14, 1887

Hayes also nominated Stanley Matthews to the Supreme Court, but the United States Senate did not act on the nomination; Matthews was renominated by Hayes' successor, James A. Garfield, and was confirmed.

== Circuit courts ==
#	Judge	Circuit	Nomination date	Confirmation date	Began active service	Ended active service
1	John Baxter	Sixth	October 25, 1877 (Note: Renominated on December 6, 1877.)	December 13, 1877	December 13, 1877	April 2, 1886
2	Samuel Blatchford	Second	February 15, 1878	March 4, 1878	March 4, 1878	March 22, 1882
3	John Lowell	First	December 16, 1878	December 18, 1878	December 18, 1878	May 1, 1884
4	George W. McCrary	Eighth	December 1, 1879	December 9, 1879	December 9, 1879	March 18, 1884

== District courts ==
#	Judge	Court (Note: See List of United States district and territorial courts)	Nomination date	Confirmation date	Began active service	Ended active service
1	Hoyt Henry Wheeler	D. Vt.	March 15, 1877	March 16, 1877	March 16, 1877	September 30, 1906
2	Romanzo Bunn	W.D. Wis.	October 25, 1877	October 30, 1877	October 30, 1877	January 9, 1905
3	William Gardner Choate	S.D.N.Y.	March 14, 1878	March 25, 1878	March 25, 1878	June 1, 1881
4	Eli Shelby Hammond	W.D. Tenn.	June 15, 1878	June 17, 1878	June 17, 1878	December 17, 1904
5	Thomas Leverett Nelson	D. Mass.	January 7, 1879	January 10, 1879	January 10, 1879	November 21, 1897
6	Alexander Burton Hagner	D.D.C.	January 17, 1879	January 21, 1879	January 21, 1879	June 1, 1903
7	William Butler	E.D. Pa.	February 12, 1879	February 19, 1879	February 19, 1879	January 31, 1899
8	Walter Smith Cox	D.D.C.	February 26, 1879	March 1, 1879	March 1, 1879	July 1, 1899
9	Andrew Phelps McCormick	N.D. Tex.	April 7, 1879	April 10, 1879	April 10, 1879	March 22, 1892
10	Thomas John Morris	D. Md.	July 1, 1879	July 1, 1879	July 1, 1879	June 6, 1912
11	Charles Pinckney James	D.D.C.	December 1, 1879	December 10, 1879	July 24, 1879	December 1, 1892
12	William Hercules Hays	D. Ky.	December 1, 1879	December 10, 1879	September 6, 1879	March 7, 1880
13	Marcus W. Acheson	W.D. Pa.	January 6, 1880	January 14, 1880	January 14, 1880	February 9, 1891
14	John W. Barr	D. Ky.	April 9, 1880	April 16, 1880	April 16, 1880	February 21, 1899
15	David M. Key	E.D. Tenn. M.D. Tenn.	May 19, 1880	May 27, 1880	May 27, 1880	January 21, 1895
16	Ezekiel B. Turner	W.D. Tex.	December 14, 1880 (Note: Previously nominated to the Northern District of Texas on March 1, 1879. Renominated on March 19, 1879. That nomination was rejected on April 2, 1879. Renominated to the Western District of Texas on December 14, 1880.)	December 20, 1880	November 18, 1880	June 2, 1888

== Specialty courts (Article I) ==
=== United States Court of Claims ===
#	Judge	Nomination date	Confirmation date	Began active service	Ended active service
1	Bancroft Davis	December 12, 1877	December 14, 1877	December 14, 1877	December 9, 1881
2	William H. Hunt	April 18, 1878	May 15, 1878	May 15, 1878	March 11, 1881

== Notes ==
Renominations

== Sources ==
- Federal Judicial Center
