= William Hercules Hays =

American judge

Judge of the United States District Court for the District of Kentucky
- In office September 6, 1879 – March 7, 1880
- Appointed by: Rutherford B. Hayes
- Preceded by: Bland Ballard
- Succeeded by: John W. Barr

Member of the Kentucky House of Representatives from Washington County
- In office August 5, 1861 – November 1861
- Preceded by: John B. Hunter
- Succeeded by: Richard J. Browne

Personal details
- Born: William Hercules Hays; August 26, 1820 Washington County, Kentucky
- Died: March 7, 1880 (aged 59) Louisville, Kentucky
- Education: read law

William Hercules Hays (August 26, 1820 – March 7, 1880) was a United States district judge of the United States District Court for the District of Kentucky.

== Education and career ==
Born in Washington County, Kentucky, Hays read law in 1845. He entered private practice of law in Springfield, Kentucky from 1845 to 1851. He was a county judge in Washington County from 1851 to 1859. Hays resumed private practice in Springfield from 1859 to 1860. He was a member of the Kentucky House of Representatives in 1861. He was in the United States Army as a colonel from 1861 to 1866. Upon the resignation of its first commander, Hays became commanding officer of the 10th Kentucky Infantry. During the Battle of Chickamauga, Hays assumed command of Croxton's 2nd Brigade of Brannan's Third Division in the XIV Corps; and eventually command of the 2nd division. He rose to the rank of general officer. Following the American Civil War, he was State inspector general of Kentucky from 1865 to 1866. He was an oil and gas entrepreneur in Springfield from 1866 to 1867 and in private practice there from 1867 to 1879.

== Federal judicial service ==
Hays received a recess appointment from President Rutherford B. Hayes on September 6, 1879, to a seat on the United States District Court for the District of Kentucky vacated by Judge Bland Ballard. He was nominated to the same position by President Hayes on December 1, 1879. He was confirmed by the United States Senate on December 10, 1879, and received his commission the same day. His service terminated on March 7, 1880, due to his death in Louisville, Kentucky.

== Sources ==
Legal offices
Preceded by Bland Ballard	Judge of the United States District Court for the District of Kentucky; 1879–1880	Succeeded by John W. Barr
