= Asher G. Caruth =

American politician (1844–1907)

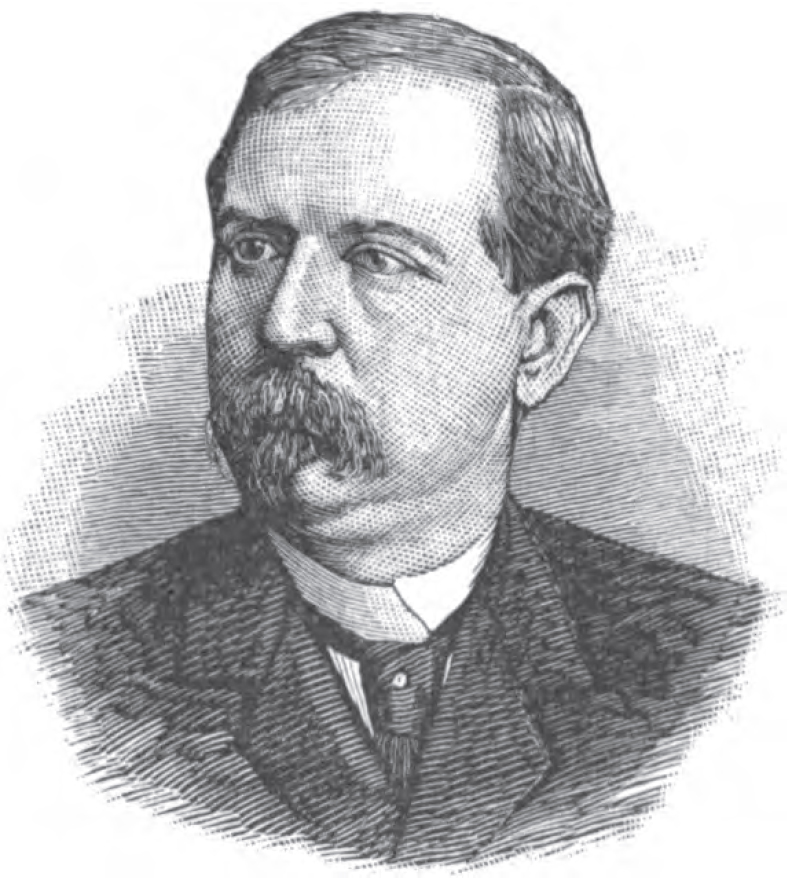

Member of the U.S. House of Representatives from Kentucky's 5th district
- In office March 4, 1887 – March 3, 1895
- Preceded by: Albert S. Willis
- Succeeded by: Albert S. Berry

Personal details
- Born: February 7, 1844 Scottsville, Kentucky, U.S.
- Died: November 25, 1907 (aged 63) Louisville, Kentucky, U.S.
- Resting place: Cave Hill Cemetery
- Party: Democratic
- Spouse: Ella Terry (m. 1871)
- Education: University of Louisville School of Law
- Profession: Lawyer

Asher Graham Caruth (February 7, 1844 – November 25, 1907) was a U.S. representative from Kentucky.

== Early life and family ==
Asher G. Caruth was born in Scottsville, Kentucky, on February 7, 1844. He was the third child born to Henry Clay and Mary (Mansfield) Caruth.

Caruth attended the public schools of Philadelphia, Pennsylvania, before graduating from the high school of Louisville in June 1864. Later that year, he became the law librarian of the city of Louisville. He matriculated to the law department of the University of Louisville (now the Louis D. Brandeis School of Law), graduating in March 1866. He was admitted to the bar and commenced practice in Hopkinsville, Kentucky. While there, he established the Kentucky Weekly New Era newspaper.

On February 23, 1871, Caruth married Ella Terry.

== Political career ==
Caruth moved to Louisville in 1871 and continued the practice of law. From 1873 to 1880, he was annually elected attorney of the Board of Trustees of the Louisville Public Schools. In 1876, he served as a Democratic presidential elector for the ticket of Samuel J. Tilden and Thomas Andrews Hendricks. In 1880, he was elected Commonwealth's Attorney for the ninth judicial district of Kentucky for a six-year term. He was re-elected without opposition in 1886.

Caruth resigned as Commonwealth's Attorney in March 1887 after being elected to represent the Fifth District in the U.S. House of Representatives. He served in the Fiftieth and to the three succeeding Congresses (March 4, 1887 – March 3, 1895). He was an unsuccessful candidate for renomination in 1894.

== Later life and death ==
After his tenure in Congress, Caruth resumed the practice of law in Louisville. He served as judge of the criminal division of the Jefferson County Circuit Court in 1902. He served as commissioner of the St. Louis Exposition in 1904. He died in Louisville on November 25, 1907, and was interred in Cave Hill Cemetery.

U.S. House of Representatives
Preceded by Albert S. Willis	Member of the U.S. House of Representatives from Kentucky's 5th congressional district March 4, 1887 – March 3, 1895	Succeeded by Walter Evans
