= Harold M. Sewall =

American politician and diplomat

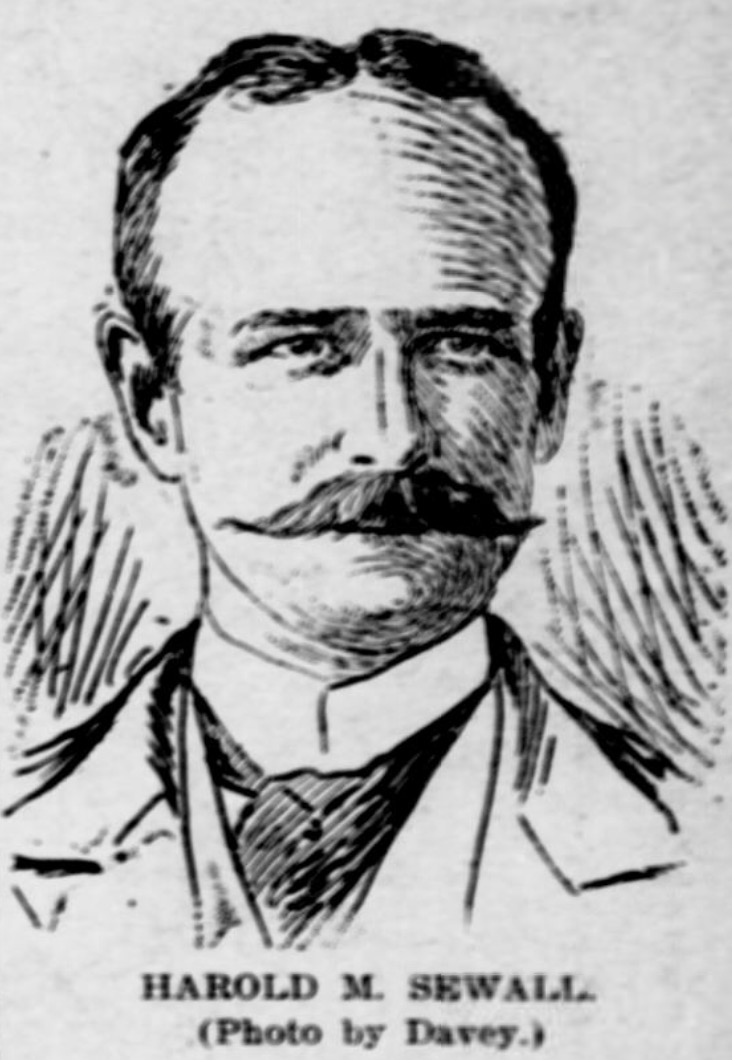

United States Minister to Hawaii
- In office 1897 – August 12, 1898
- President: William McKinley
- Preceded by: Albert Sydney Willis
- Succeeded by: Position abolished

Personal details
- Born: January 3, 1860 Bath, Maine, U.S.
- Died: October 28, 1924 (aged 64) New York City, New York, U.S.
- Resting place: Oak Grove Cemetery; Bath, Maine, U.S.

Harold Marsh Sewall (January 3, 1860 – October 28, 1924) was an American politician and diplomat.

Sewall was born in Bath, Sagadahoc County, Maine. He was the son of Arthur Sewall. Sewall served in the Maine House of Representatives, 1896, and from 1903 to 1907; he was a delegate to Republican National Convention from Maine, 1896. He was the last United States Minister to Hawaii, arriving in 1897 to the Republic of Hawaii after the death of Albert Sydney Willis, and returning in 1898 after annexation formed the Territory of Hawaii. He was a member of the Maine State Senate, from 1907 to 1909 and was a candidate for the United States representative from Maine 2nd district, 1914; member of Republican National Committee from Maine, 1924. He died in a hospital at New York City. His interment was at Oak Grove Cemetery, Bath, Maine.

He was married to Camilla Ashe, who was the first president of the Hawaiian Red Cross Society.

Following the death of George W. Merrill on January 10, 1914, Sewall became the last living person to serve as the United States Minister to Hawaii.

Diplomatic posts
Preceded by Albert Sydney Willis	United States Minister to Hawaii; 1897–1898	Succeeded by Annexation of Territory of Hawaii
