= Llangibby (ship) =

British steamship

The Llangibby was a British steamship named after the town of Llangybi, Monmouthshire.

In August 1904, the Llangibby was involved in a serious collision on the high seas with the American ship Roanoke, off the coast of South America. The Llangibby was under Captain Holt and was bound from Rosario and Buenos Aires for Europe. The Llangibby put into Bahia, Brazil for repairs.

The Llangibby was operating between Australia and Europe, with a Greek and Turkish crew, until at least 1911.
