= James E. Cantrill =

American politician

22nd Lieutenant Governor of Kentucky
- In office September 2, 1879 – September 4, 1883
- Governor: Luke P. Blackburn
- Preceded by: John C. Underwood
- Succeeded by: James R. Hindman

Member of the Kentucky House of Representatives from Scott County
- In office August 5, 1867 – August 7, 1871
- Preceded by: W. P. Duvall
- Succeeded by: John A. Bell

Personal details
- Born: James Edwards Cantrill; June 20, 1839 Bourbon County, Kentucky, U.S.
- Died: April 5, 1908 (aged 68) Georgetown, Kentucky, U.S.
- Resting place: Georgetown Cemetery
- Party: Democratic
- Spouses: Jennie Moore (?-1879) m. 1869; Mary Cecil Cantrill (1848-1928)

Military service
- Allegiance: Confederate States
- Branch/service: Confederate States Army
- Rank: Captain
- Battles/wars: American Civil War

James Edwards Cantrill (June 20, 1839 – April 5, 1908) was elected the 22nd lieutenant governor of Kentucky serving from 1879 to 1883 under Governor Luke P. Blackburn. He also served as a circuit court judge starting in 1892, and in 1898 was elected to the Court of Appeals bench.

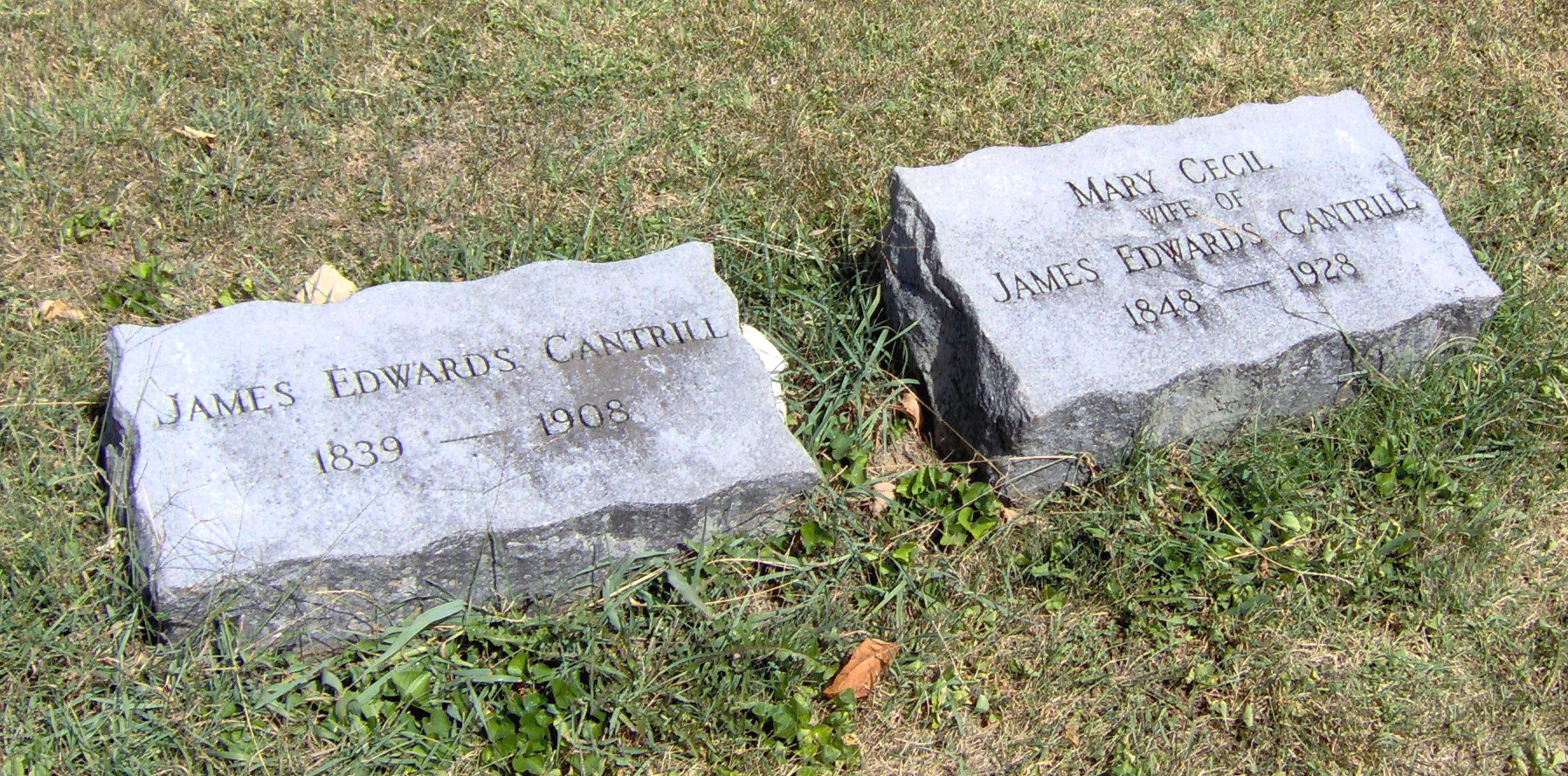
Gravestones of Kentucky Lt Governor James Cantrill and wife Mary at Georgetown Cemetery.

== Background ==
James E. Cantrill was born in Bourbon County, Kentucky on June 20, 1838, to Susan F. and Edward F. Cantrill. He attended public school there until he was sixteen when he enrolled at Georgetown College in Georgetown, Kentucky. Upon graduation in 1858 he studied law with Marcellus Polk. He moved in 1859 to St. Louis, Missouri to practice law for a year before he returned to Kentucky to enlist in the Confederate Army. He was a Freemason, a member of the Knights Templar, and Past Grand Commander of the Grand Commandery of Kentucky.

Cantrill first married Jennie Moore of Fayette County on January 5, 1869. They lived in Georgetown, Kentucky where they had one son, James Campbell Cantrill (1870–1923), who went on to be a U.S. Representative from Kentucky. Jennie Moore Cantrill, granddaughter of Rev. Barton W. Stone died in 1876.

Cantrill then married Mary Cecil of Boyle County, Kentucky. In 1887, Cantrill invested in the expansion the Paris, Georgetown & Frankfort Railroad. Both he and his new wife invested in 1888 in the Home Construction Company which served as the funding mechanism for the construction of the Kentucky Midland Railroad (a company of which he was already a director). He served as President of Home Construction Company. In 1893, she was appointed to the Board of Lady Managers of the World's Columbian Exposition at Chicago and supported the Kentucky Equal Rights Association lobbying efforts. They had one son, Cecil.

== Military and political career ==
In the American Civil War he served as a captain in the Confederate States Army Cavalry, first serving under Col. D. Howard Smith of the Fifth Kentucky Cavalry then transferring to serve as Morgan's Men. Later he became a member of the George Johnson Camp of the Confederate Veterans' Association of Kentucky.

Cantrill served in the Kentucky House of Representatives from 1867 to 1871.

He served for several year as Master Commissioner of the Scott Circuit County before becoming Circuit Judge in 1892. While Cantrill was Lieutenant Governor, Jesse James robbed a stagecoach in Cave City, Kentucky, stealing a gold watch from Judge R.H. Roundtree, and a diamond ring from his daughter. Cantrill offered a reward of $1,500 for the arrest and conviction of the robbers. This reward was never collected for the proper criminal, as James was shot by a member of his own gang, but his guilt was shown by the possession of Judge Roundtree's gold watch.

During his second term as Circuit Judge, he became a national figure in the controversial proceedings against the assassins of Kentucky Governor William Goebel. As the circuit judge in Franklin County, Kentucky, Cantrill swore in William Goebel as Kentucky governor in 1900, a day after Goebel was shot. When Goebel died, Cantrill presided over the trials of the alleged assassins, and backed the Democratic takeover of state government. This perseverance made him a hero in his hometown of Georgetown and encouraged him to run (unsuccessfully) for a seat in the Kentucky Senate in 1901.

In 1904, Cantrill successfully campaigned for a seat on the Kentucky Court of Appeals. That year he suffered from a stroke from which he never recovered, however he traveled to Frankfort to be sworn in as a member of the Kentucky Court of Appeals.

== Death ==
Cantrill died on April 5, 1908, at his home on Chambers Avenue in Georgetown, Kentucky. He was buried at Georgetown Cemetery in Georgetown, Kentucky.

Political offices
Preceded by John C. Underwood	Lieutenant Governor of Kentucky; 1879–1883	Succeeded by James Robert Hindman
