= Walter Evans (American politician) =

American judge (1842–1923)

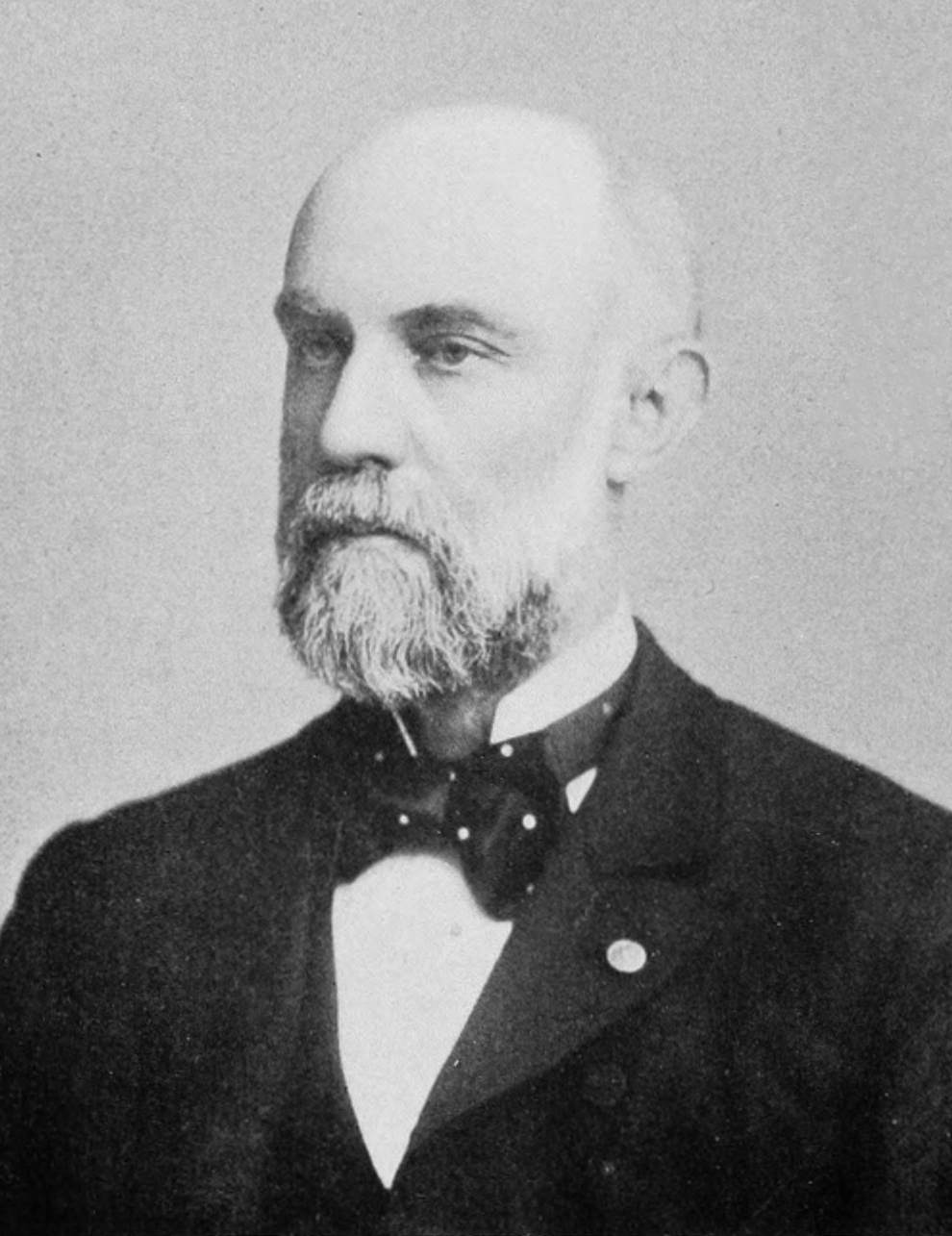
- Evans, c. 1899

Judge of the United States District Court for the Western District of Kentucky
- In office July 1, 1901 – December 30, 1923
- Appointed by: Operation of law
- Preceded by: Seat established by 31 Stat. 781
- Succeeded by: Charles Harwood Moorman

Judge of the United States District Court for the District of Kentucky
- In office March 3, 1899 – July 1, 1901
- Appointed by: William McKinley
- Preceded by: John W. Barr
- Succeeded by: Seat abolished

Member of the U.S. House of Representatives from Kentucky's 5th district
- In office March 4, 1895 – March 3, 1899
- Preceded by: Asher G. Caruth
- Succeeded by: Oscar Turner

10th Commissioner of Internal Revenue
- In office May 21, 1883 – March 19, 1885
- President: Chester A. Arthur
- Preceded by: John Jay Knox Jr. (acting)
- Succeeded by: Joseph S. Miller

Member of the Kentucky Senate from the 6th district
- In office September 1873 – August 2, 1875
- Preceded by: E. P. Campbell
- Succeeded by: C. N. Pendleton

Member of the Kentucky House of Representatives from Christian County
- In office August 7, 1871 – August 4, 1873
- Preceded by: James A. McKenzie
- Succeeded by: O. S. Parker

Personal details
- Born: Walter Evans; September 18, 1842 Glasgow, Kentucky, U.S.
- Died: December 30, 1923 (aged 81) Louisville, Kentucky, U.S.
- Resting place: Cave Hill Cemetery; Louisville, Kentucky, U.S.
- Party: Republican
- Relatives: Burwell C. Ritter (uncle)
- Education: Read law

Walter Evans (September 18, 1842 – December 30, 1923) was a United States representative from Kentucky and a United States district judge of the United States District Court for the District of Kentucky and of the United States District Court for the Western District of Kentucky.

== Education and career ==
Born on September 18, 1842, in Glasgow, Kentucky, Evans attended the public schools near Harrodsburg. He moved to Hopkinsville and served as deputy county clerk in 1859. He served in the Union Army from 1861 to 1863. He served as deputy and later chief clerk of the circuit court. He read law and was admitted to the bar in 1864. He entered private practice in Hopkinsville from 1864 to 1871. He was a delegate to the Republican National Conventions in 1868, 1872, 1880 and 1884. He was a member of the Kentucky House of Representatives from 1871 to 1873. He was a member of the Kentucky Senate from 1873 to 1875. He resumed private practice in Louisville, Kentucky from 1875 to 1883. He was an unsuccessful candidate for election to the 45th United States Congress in 1876. He was the Republican nominee for Governor of Kentucky in 1879. He was appointed Commissioner of the Bureau of Internal Revenue (now the Internal Revenue Service) of the United States Department of the Treasury by President Chester Arthur, serving from May 21, 1883, to April 20, 1885. He returned to private practice in Louisville from 1885 to 1895.

== Congressional service ==
Evans was elected as a Republican from Kentucky's 5th congressional district to the United States House of Representatives of the 54th and 55th United States Congresses, serving from March 4, 1895, to March 3, 1899. He was an unsuccessful candidate for reelection in 1898 to the 56th United States Congress.

== Federal judicial service ==
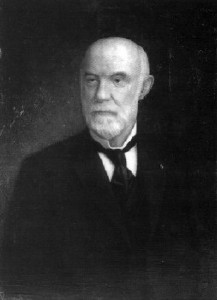
Judicial portrait of Evans, 1906.

Evans was nominated by President William McKinley on March 3, 1899, to a seat on the United States District Court for the District of Kentucky vacated by Judge John W. Barr. He was confirmed by the United States Senate on March 3, 1899, and received his commission the same day. Evans was reassigned by operation of law to the United States District Court for the Western District of Kentucky on July 1, 1901, to a new seat authorized by 31 Stat. 781. In 1920, he successfully challenged an income tax against his earnings as a judge in Evans v. Gore. His service terminated on December 30, 1923, due to his death in Louisville, Kentucky. He was interred in Cave Hill Cemetery in Louisville.

== Family ==
Evans was the nephew of United States Representative Burwell C. Ritter.

== Sources ==
- United States Congress. "Walter Evans (id: E000260)". Biographical Directory of the United States Congress.
- Walter Evans at the Biographical Directory of Federal Judges, a publication of the Federal Judicial Center.

Party political offices
| Preceded by John Marshall Harlan | Republican nominee for Governor of Kentucky; 1879 | Succeeded by Thomas Z. Morrow |
U.S. House of Representatives
| Preceded by Asher G. Caruth | Member of the U.S. House of Representatives from Kentucky's 5th congressional district 1895–1899 | Succeeded by Oscar Turner |
Legal offices
| Preceded by John W. Barr | Judge of the United States District Court for the District of Kentucky; 1899–1901 | Succeeded by Seat abolished |
| Preceded by Seat established by 31 Stat. 781 | Judge of the United States District Court for the Western District of Kentucky; 1901–1923 | Succeeded by Charles Harwood Moorman |
