= Roanoke (ship) =

Four-masted barque built 1892

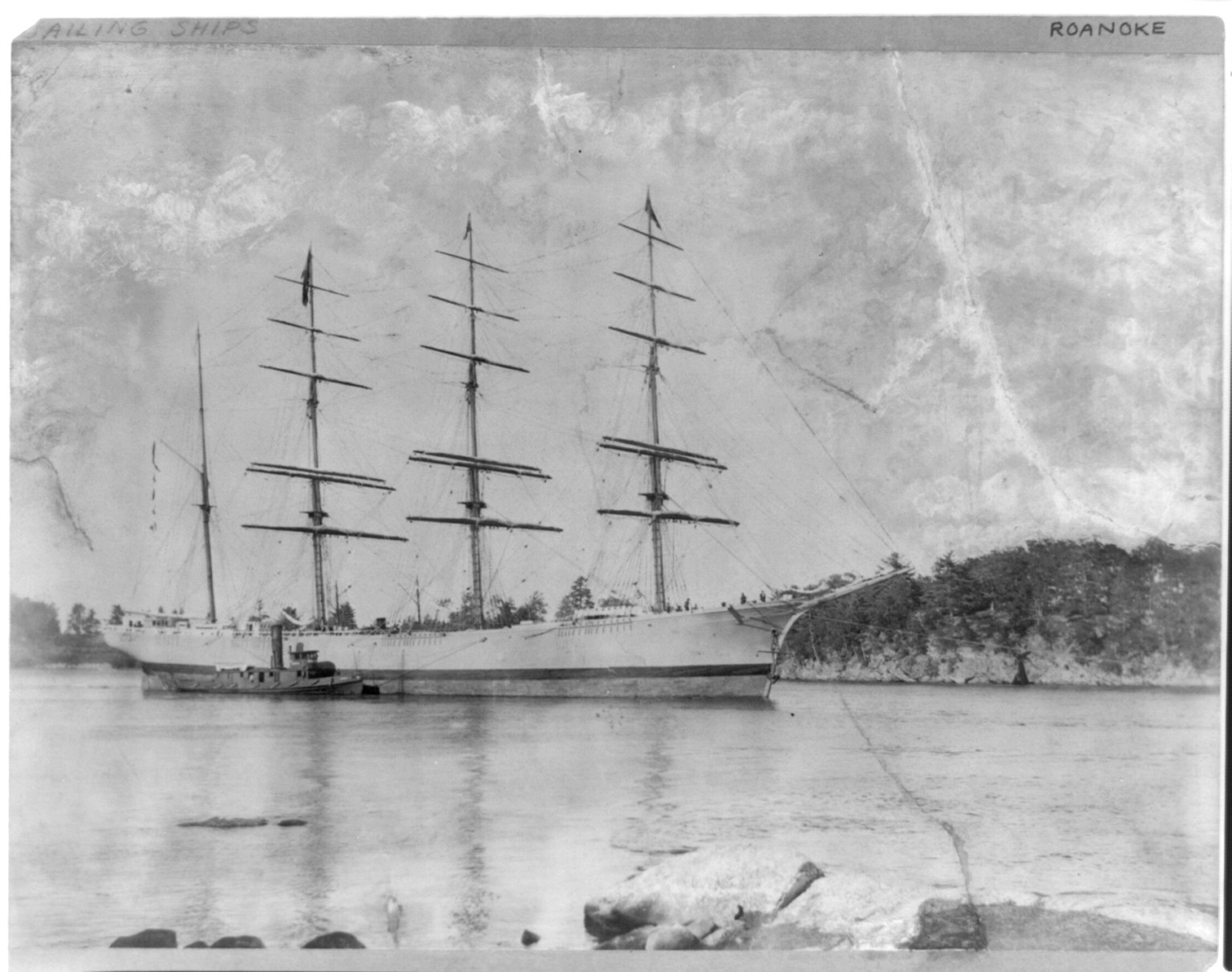

History

United States
- Name: Roanoke
- Builder: Messrs. A. Sewall and Co., Bath, Maine
- Launched: September 20, 1892
- Fate: burned August 10, 1905

General characteristics
- Length: 311 ft (95 m)
- Beam: 49 ft (15 m)
- Draft: 27 ft (8.2 m)
- Depth of hold: 29 ft (8.8 m)
- Sail plan: barque

Roanoke was one of the largest wooden ships ever constructed.

== Service ==
Roanoke was a four-masted barque built by Messrs. A. Sewall and Co. in 1892 on the Kennebec River at Bath, Maine, in the United States. With the exception of Great Republic and the six-masted wooden schooner Wyoming (3,730.54 GRT, 450 ft length overall) she was the largest wooden ship ever built in an American yard. Her gross register tonnage was 3,347, but on a draft of 27 feet (8.2 meters) she could stow away 2,000 additional tons. Her length was 311 feet (95 meters), her beam 49 feet (15 meters), and her hold depth 29 feet (8.8 meters). Her lower yards were 95 feet (29 meters) long, and her foremast truck was 180 feet (55 meters) from the deck. The keel was in two tiers of 16-inch (41 cm) white oak, her garboards were eight inches (20 cm) thick, and her ceiling in the lower hold was 14 inches (36 cm). Into her construction went 1,250,000 board feet of yellow pine, 14,000 cubic feet (396.4 cubic meters) of oak, 98,000 treenails, and 550 hackmatack knees.

== Loss ==
Roanoke left New York City on her final voyage in June 1904 and was involved in a serious collision with the British steamship Llangibby off the coast of South America in August 1904, requiring repairs for three months in Rio de Janeiro, Brazil. After delivering cargo to Australia, Roanoke was loading chromium ore near Nouméa, New Caledonia, when she was destroyed by fire on the night of August 10, 1905.
