= List of presidents of the United States by judicial appointments =

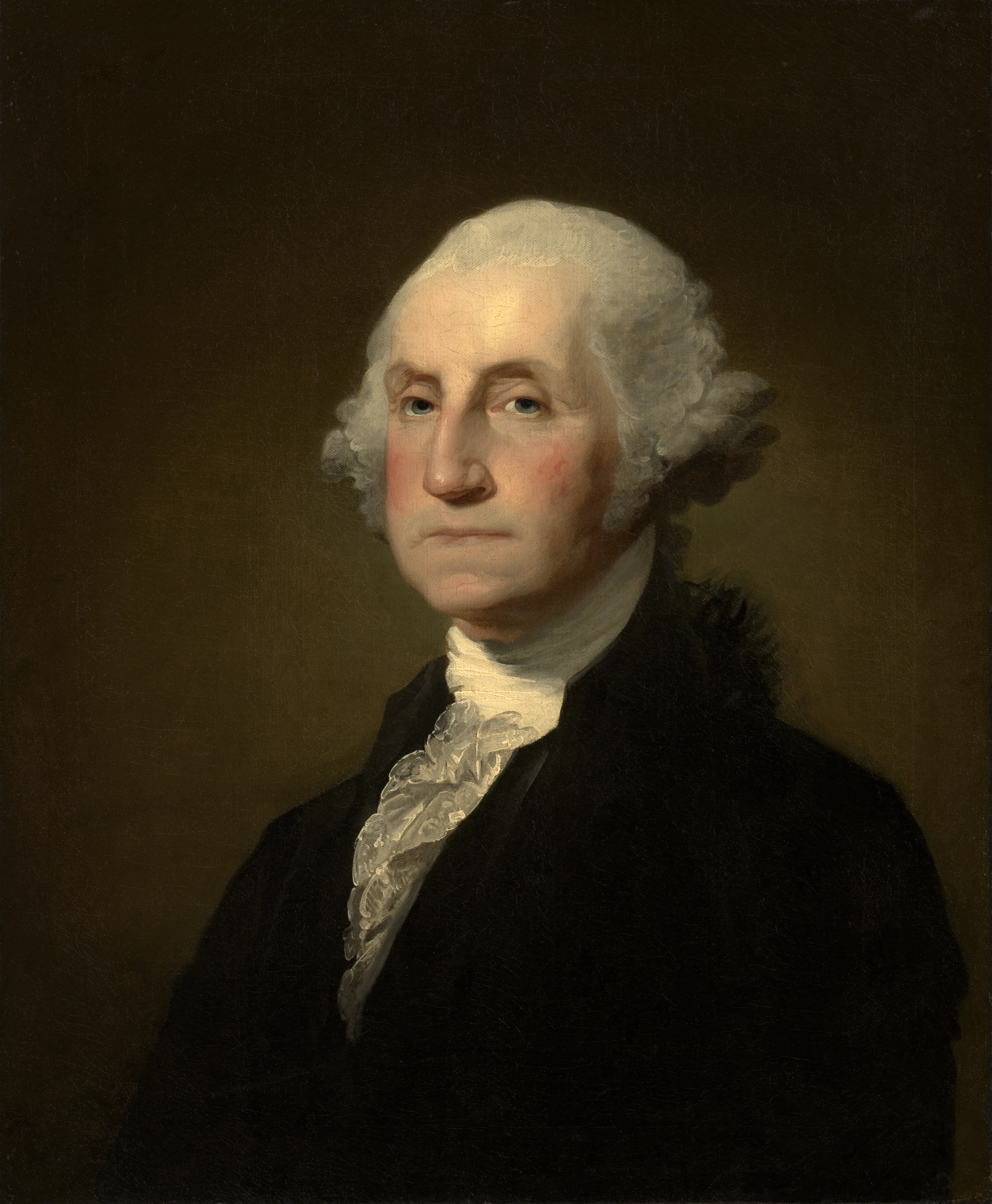
As the first president, George Washington appointed the entire federal judiciary. His record of eleven Supreme Court appointments still stands.

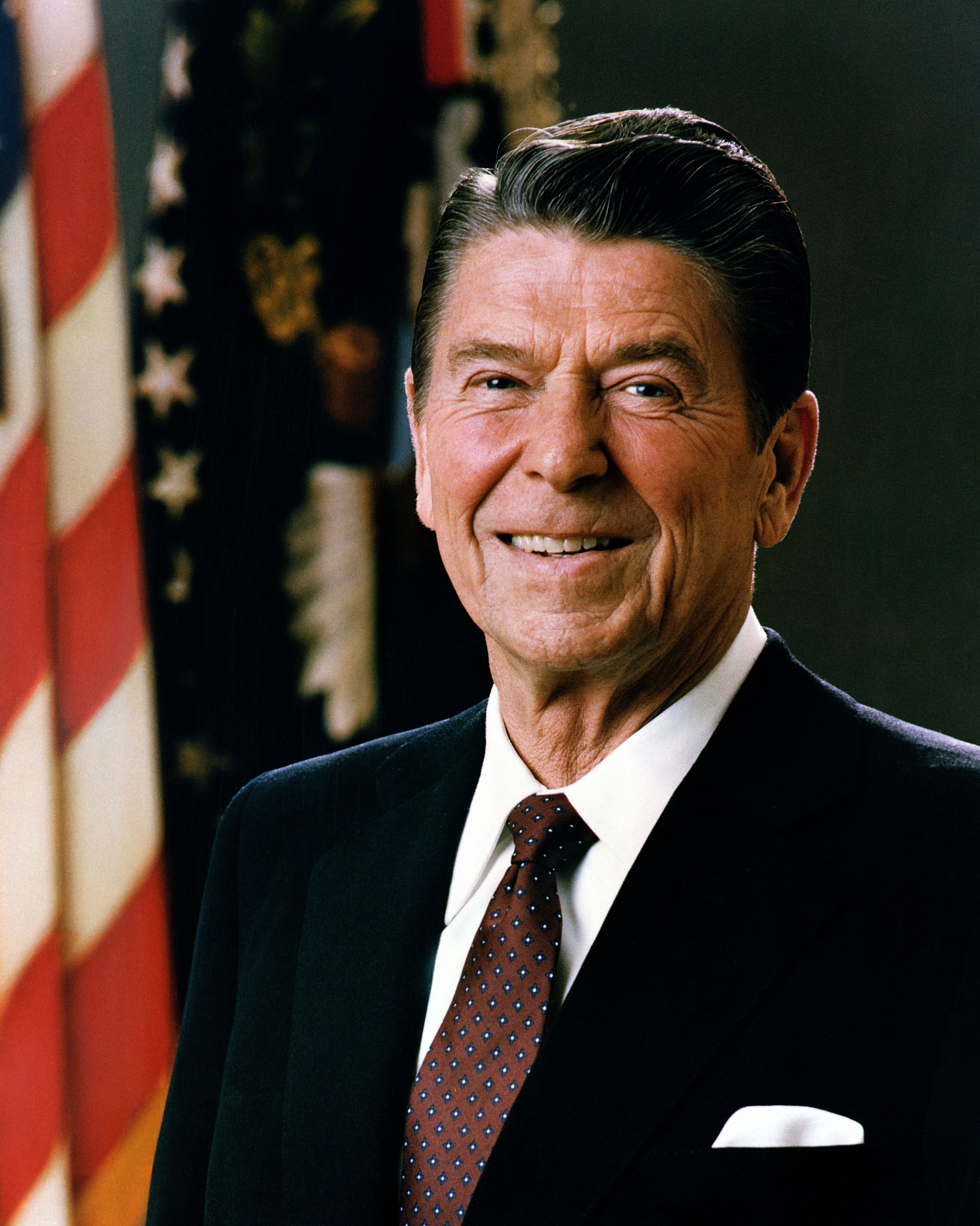
Ronald Reagan appointed 383 federal judges, more than any other president.

Following is a list indicating the number of Article III federal judicial appointments made by each president of the United States. The number of judicial offices has risen significantly from the time when George Washington's 39 appointments were sufficient to maintain the entire federal judiciary for eight years. As of January 2020, there are 874 authorized Article III judgeships – 9 on the Supreme Court, 179 on the courts of appeals, 677 for the district courts including 10 temporary judgeships, and 9 on the United States Court of International Trade.

To date, Ronald Reagan has appointed the largest number of federal judges, with 383, followed closely by Bill Clinton with 378. Jimmy Carter has appointed the most federal judges in a single term, with 262, followed by followed by Joe Biden and Donald Trump’s first term, with 235 and 234 appointments, respectively. William Henry Harrison, who died 31 days after his inauguration, is the only president to have appointed no federal judges.

== How appointments are counted ==
In many instances, the number of judgeships appointed is greater than the number of people appointed as judges, because a president may appoint the same person as a judge to different courts over the course of their presidency. For example, Donald Trump appointed Amy Coney Barrett to the Seventh Circuit, and later appointed her to the Supreme Court. There are also instances in which an individual is appointed to multiple district courts in a single state. For example, Donald Trump appointed John F. Heil III to the Eastern, Northern, and Western Districts of Oklahoma.

In some rare instances, a federal judge resigns their judgeship, and is later reappointed to a federal judgeship – possibly even to the same court – by a different president. A noted example of this is that of Charles Evans Hughes, who resigned from the United States Supreme Court to run for president against Woodrow Wilson, and was later returned to the court as Chief Justice of the United States by Herbert Hoover. Another rare situation occurs where a court that has not been specifically designated as an Article III court is transformed into an Article III court. This occurred in 1958 when the United States Court of Customs and Patent Appeals was changed from an Article I court to an Article III court. In that case, judges who were not initially appointed to an Article III court may become Article III judges without being specifically appointed by the sitting president, or approved by the sitting Senate. However, judges on such bodies have previously been appointed to Article I courts by the president, and those appointments have been approved by the Senate, which must also vote in favor of the legislation that would change the status of such judges. Appointments to Article I courts are not counted in each president's total number of appointments.

The list does not include nominees who were rejected by Congress before having served, but does include the twenty-two recess appointments who were not confirmed by the Senate after having served for some period. The most famous instance of such a post-appointment rejection is that of George Washington's recess appointment of John Rutledge as Chief Justice during a congressional recess in July, 1795. Because of Rutledge's political views and occasional mental illness, the Senate rejected his nomination in December of that year, and Rutledge subsequently attempted suicide and then resigned.

== Judicial appointments by president ==
Because appointees to the short-lived United States Commerce Court were duly appointed as United States circuit judges, they are counted as circuit judges. Those individuals appointed to the United States Court of Customs and Patent Appeals and the United States Court of Claims during the period those courts existed as Article III courts are counted as circuit judges. Individuals appointed to the United States Customs Court during its existence as an Article III Court and to the United States Court of International Trade are counted as district judges.

	All judicial appointments				Currently active				Currently senior status			
President	Supreme Court justices	Circuit judges	District judges	Total	Supreme Court justices	Circuit judges	District judges	Total	Supreme Court justices	Circuit judges	District judges	Total
George Washington	11	–	28	39								
John Adams	3	16	4	23								
Thomas Jefferson	3	7	9	19								
James Madison	2	2	9	13								
James Monroe	1	–	21	22								
John Quincy Adams	1	–	11	12								
Andrew Jackson	5	–	18	23								
Martin Van Buren	3	–	8	11								
William H. Harrison	–	–	–	–								
John Tyler	1	–	6	7								
James K. Polk	2	1	7	10								
Zachary Taylor	–	–	4	4								
Millard Fillmore	1	–	5	6								
Franklin Pierce	1	3	12	16								
James Buchanan	1	–	7	8								
Abraham Lincoln	5	–	27	32								
Andrew Johnson	–	–	9	9								
Ulysses S. Grant	4	10	32	46								
Rutherford B. Hayes	2	4	16	22								
James A. Garfield	1	1	3	5								
Chester A. Arthur	2	4	15	21								
Grover Cleveland	4	11	30	45								
Benjamin Harrison	4	12	26	42								
William McKinley	1	6	28	35								
Theodore Roosevelt	3	19	58	80								
William Howard Taft	6 (Note: One of these appointments involved elevating a sitting associate justice to Chief Justice of the United States.)	13	38	57								
Woodrow Wilson	3	20	53	76								
Warren G. Harding	4	6	42	52								
Calvin Coolidge	1	17	64	82								
Herbert Hoover	3	16	44	63								
Franklin D. Roosevelt	9	51	134	194								
Harry S. Truman	4	27	102	133								
Dwight D. Eisenhower	5	49	131	185								
John F. Kennedy	2	22	102	126								
Lyndon B. Johnson	2	46	136	184								
Richard Nixon	4	51	180	235					–	2	–	2
Gerald Ford	1	12	52	65					–	1	2	3
Jimmy Carter	–	59	203	262					–	9	19	28
Ronald Reagan	4	83	296	383	–	5	5	10	1	22	65	88
George H. W. Bush	2	42	149	193	1	4	2	7	–	20	64	84
Bill Clinton	2	66	310	378	–	9	17	26	1	35	156	192
George W. Bush	2	62	263	327	2	23	61	86	–	18	126	144
Barack Obama	2	55	272	329	2	34	179	215	–	12	63	75
Donald Trump	3	66	222	295	3	65	217	285	–	–	–	–
Joe Biden	1	45	189	235	1	44	185	230	–	–	–	–
Total	121	896	3,339	4,356	9	181	663	853	2	118	495	617
	All judicial appointments				Currently active				Currently senior status			
President	Supreme Court justices	Circuit judges	District judges	Total	Supreme Court justices	Circuit judges	District judges	Total	Supreme Court justices	Circuit judges	District judges	Total

== Article I appointments ==
The appointment of Article I judges is more difficult to count, because a large number of positions appointed by the president have quasi-judicial functions. Some Article I judges, however, are clearly designated, such as the judges of the United States Court of Federal Claims, the United States Tax Court, the United States Court of Appeals for the Armed Forces, and the United States Court of Appeals for Veterans Claims. As with Article III judges, the number of Article I appointees that could be characterized as judges increased substantially beginning in the twentieth century.

== See also ==
- Federal judiciary of the United States
- Judicial appointment history for United States federal courts

== Sources ==
- Federal Judicial Center
- United States Courts: Judgeship Appointments by President
