= The Daily Exchange =

Defunct daily newspaper published in Baltimore, Maryland, US

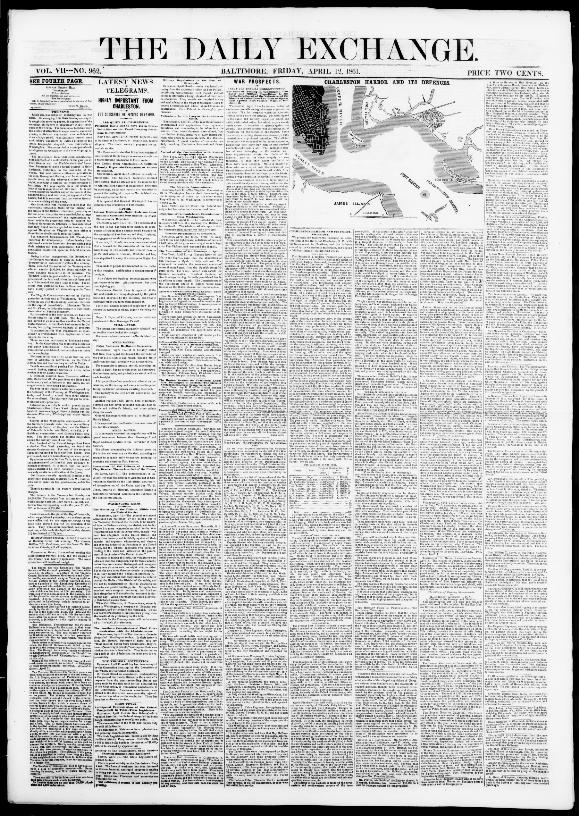
- The front page of The Daily Exchange, April 12, 1861.
- Type: Daily newspaper
- Format: Broadsheet
- Founder(s): Charles G. Kerr; Thomas Hall Jr.
- Opinion editor: Severn Teackle Wallis
- Founded: 1858
- Ceased publication: 1861
- Headquarters: Baltimore, Maryland

The Daily Exchange was a daily newspaper published in Baltimore, Maryland, United States from 1858 to 1861. It was originally owned and edited by Charles G. Kerr and Thomas Hall Jr. In 1859, Henry Fitzhugh, William Carpenter, and Frank Key Howard bought into the paper. Howard soon headed the editorial staff and Severn Teackle Wallis contributed editorial columns frequently.

It was a four-page paper and was published every morning except Sundays. The paper included news items; financial reports and editorials; political intelligence and editorials, claiming to “to preserve a position of honest and fearless independence;” reviews of literature and art; and advertisements.

== Background ==
In 1858, Baltimore was highly run by the mob, and the Exchange was highly critical of the Know-Nothing Party. Any businesses or political figures involved were viewed as corrupt. Following a series of threats to the editors, on August 12, 1858, the paper's office was broken into, and employees were assaulted and property was destroyed. All of these tactics only served to increase the popularity of the Exchange.

In 1860, the scope of the newspaper shifted to national politics and Kerr, Hall, and Fitzhugh sold their shares to William Wilkins Glenn, who maintained ownership with Carpenter and Howard. The Exchange backed John C. Breckinridge in the 1860 presidential election and supported states' rights although not secession. Because of its anti-Lincoln administration views during the Civil War, the newspaper was suppressed by the government and on September 10, 1861, finally banned from the U.S. Mail. The next day the Exchange published an editorial of protest and Howard was arrested that night and Glenn was arrested a few days later. Carpenter, who remained free, wrote a scathing editorial appearing on September 14, after which the government permanently suppressed the paper, alongside the Marlboro Planter's Advocate and the Frederick Herald.

Days later, two former employees of the Exchange, Edward F. Carter and William H. Neilson, began publishing the Maryland Times with Carpenter serving as editor. The paper looked exactly like the Exchange and was discontinued on September 24, 1861. The Maryland News Sheet replaced it and was published until August 14, 1862, when it was also suppressed by the government.

The Exchange strongly opposed the nomination of Augustus W. Bradford as a gubernatorial candidate, calling him an "extreme coercionist" and his support of the government, "unconditional".

Carter and Neilson then established the Baltimore Daily Gazette on October 7, 1862, and by 1865 ownership of the paper was returned to Glenn, Carpenter, and Howard.
