= List of shipwrecks in May 1833 =

The list of shipwrecks in May 1833 includes ships sunk, foundered, grounded, or otherwise lost during May 1833.

== 1 May ==
List of shipwrecks: 1 May 1833
Ship	State	Description
Flora	(United Kingdom of Great Britain and Ireland) New South Wales	The ship was wrecked on the Great Barrier Reef.
Thomas and Eleanor	United Kingdom	The ship was driven ashore and wrecked near "Scowrie". Her crew were rescued.

== 3 May ==
List of shipwrecks: 3 May 1833
Ship	State	Description
Albion	United Kingdom	The brig sprang a leak and foundered in the Atlantic Ocean with the loss of fifteen of the 30 people on board. Survivors were rescued by the brig Neptune (United Kingdom). She was on a voyage from Cork to Quebec City, Lower Canada, British North America.

== 5 May ==
List of shipwrecks: 5 May 1833
Ship	State	Description
Eagle	United Kingdom	The ship ran aground in Carnarvon Bay and was wrecked. Her crew were rescued. She was on a voyage from Liverpool, Lancashire to Newfoundland, British North America.
Sweedland	United Kingdom	The ship was lost at Saugor, India.

== 7 May ==
List of shipwrecks: 7 May 1833
Ship	State	Description
Harriet	United Kingdom	The ship was wrecked on the Riding Rocks. Her crew were rescued. She was on a voyage from Liverpool, Lancashire to Mobile, Alabama, United States.
Tronto	United Kingdom	The ship was driven ashore at St. Mary's, Nova Scotia, British North America.

== 8 May ==
List of shipwrecks: 8 May 1833
Ship	State	Description
Catharine	United Kingdom	The ship was wrecked by ice. Her crew were rescued by Traveller (United Kingdom). She was on a voyage from Irvine, Ayrshire to Quebec City, Lower Canada, British North America.

== 9 May ==
List of shipwrecks: 9 May 1833
Ship	State	Description
Harvest Home	United Kingdom	The ship was wrecked on whilst on a voyage from Newcastle upon Tyne, Northumberland to Miramichi, New Brunswick, British North America.

== 10 May ==
List of shipwrecks: 10 May 1833
Ship	State	Description
Courier de Cette	France	The ship sprang a leak and was beached at Harfleur, Seine-Inférieure, where she was subsequently wrecked. She was on a voyage from Havre de Grâce, Seine-Inférieure to Saint-Malo, Ille-et-Vilaine. An insurance claim was rejected due to suspected barratry.
Martha	United Kingdom	The brig was sunk by ice in the Atlantic Ocean 290 nautical miles (540 km) off the coast of Newfoundland. Her crew survived. She was on a voyage from Liverpool, Lancashire to Newfoundland.

== 11 May ==
List of shipwrecks: 11 May 1833
Ship	State	Description
Lady of the Lake	United Kingdom	The brig was sunk by ice off Cape St. Francis, Newfoundland, British North America with the loss of between 170 and 265 lives. About 30 survivors were rescued by Amazon (United Kingdom).
Panana	United States	The ship was destroyed by fire in the Atlantic Ocean. Her crew were rescued by Fortitude (United Kingdom).
Ranger	United Kingdom	The barque was in collision with an iceberg and foundered. Her crew survived. She was on a voyage from London to Miramichi, New Brunswick, British North America.

== 12 May ==
List of shipwrecks: 12 May 1833
Ship	State	Description
Hero	United Kingdom	The ship was lost in the Grand Banks of Newfoundland. She was on a voyage from Liverpool to Newfoundland, British North America.

== 13 May ==
List of shipwrecks: 13 May 1833
Ship	State	Description
Baltic	United Kingdom	The ship departed from Manila, Spanish East Indies for Singapore. No further trace, presumed foundered with the loss of all hands.
Lady Campbell	United Kingdom	The ship was driven ashore near Saint John, New Brunswick, British North America. She was on a voyage from Greenock, Renfrewshire to Saint John.
Viscount Palmerston	United Kingdom	The ship was driven ashore on the coast of Jutland. Her crew were rescued. She was on a voyage from Liverpool, Lancashire to Saint Petersburg, Russia.

== 16 May ==
List of shipwrecks: 16 May 1833
Ship	State	Description
Fortuna	(Russian Empire) Grand Duchy of Finland	The ship struck a rock and foundered near Porvoo, Finland. The crew were rescued. Fortuna was on a voyage from London, United Kingdom of Great Britain and Ireland to Porvoo, Grand Duchy of Finland.
Julia	United Kingdom	The ship was damaged by ice and was abandoned. Her crew were rescued by Breakwater (United Kingdom). Julia was on a voyage from Sunderland, County Durham to Quebec City, Lower Canada, British North America.

== 18 May ==
List of shipwrecks: 18 May 1833
Ship	State	Description
Little Ann	United Kingdom	The ship was wrecked on the coast of British North America. Her crew were rescued by Amethyst ( (United Kingdom of Great Britain and Ireland) British North America.)

== 19 May ==
List of shipwrecks: 19 May 1833
Ship	State	Description
Elphinstone	United Kingdom	The ship was wrecked on the coast of "Mayo". She was on a voyage from Bombay, India to Sumatra.
Lioness	United States	The steamboat was destroyed by an explosion and fire in the Red River, Louisiana with the loss of fourteen lives. Lioness was on a voyage from New Orleans to Natchitoches, Louisiana.
Raikes	United Kingdom	The ship was lost in Conception Bay. She was on a voyage from Liverpool, Lancashire to Harbour Grace, Newfoundland.
Sylph	United Kingdom	The ship was abandoned in ice off Carbonear Island Newfoundland. She was later towed into "Musquito".

== 20 May ==
List of shipwrecks: 20 May 1833
Ship	State	Description
George	United Kingdom	The ship was lost off Cape Sable Island, Nova Scotia, British North America. She was on a voyage from Liverpool, Lancashire to Saint John, New Brunswick, British North America.
Orb	United States	The ship was wrecked on The Triangles. All on board were rescued. She was on a voyage from New York to Veracruz, Mexico.

== 21 May ==
List of shipwrecks: 21 May 1833
Ship	State	Description
Duke of York	British East India Company	The East Indiaman was driven ashore at "Hedgellee Creek", India. Although almost undamaged, she was not refloatable. Duke of York was on a voyage from London to Madras, India.
Eamont	United Kingdom	The East Indiaman was driven ashore and wrecked south of Kedgeree, India.
General Fisher	United Kingdom	The ship was driven ashore and wrecked south of Kedgeree.
J & H Cumming	United Kingdom	The ship was wrecked on the south coast of Long Island, United States with the loss of two lives. She was on a voyage from Liverpool, Lancashire to New York, United States.
Lord Amherst	British East India Company	The East Indiaman was driven ashore at Kedgeree and broke her back.
Robert	United Kingdom	The East Indiaman was driven ashore and wrecked north of Kedgeree.
Sultan	United Kingdom	The ship foundered off the coast of India. Two of her crew survived.

== 22 May ==
List of shipwrecks: 22 May 1833
Ship	State	Description
Hope	United Kingdom	The ship struck an iceberg and foundered. All on board were rescued. She was on a voyage from London to Quebec City, Lower Canada, British North America.

== 24 May ==
List of shipwrecks: 24 May 1833
Ship	State	Description
Elizabeth	United States	The ship was wrecked in Hell Gate. She was on a voyage from Pictou, Nova Scotia, British North America to New York.

== 27 May ==
List of shipwrecks: 27 May 1833
Ship	State	Description
Hoppet	(Russian Empire) Grand Duchy of Finland	The ship was driven ashore on "Magunsholm". She was on a voyage from Vaasa to Riga, Russia.

== 28 May ==
List of shipwrecks: 28 May 1833
Ship	State	Description
Despreux	France	The whaler was lost in the Chiloé Archipelago, Chile.

== 30 May ==
List of shipwrecks: 30 May 1833
Ship	State	Description
Twee Gebroeders	Netherlands	The ship was wrecked on Langeoog, Kingdom of Hanover. Her crew were rescued. She was on a voyage from Harlingen, Friesland to a Norwegian port.
Volunteer	United Kingdom	The ship was driven ashore and wrecked at Cape Fonchin, Nova Scotia, British North America. All on board were rescued. She was on a voyage from Cork to Quebec City, Lower Canada, British North America.

== 31 May ==
List of shipwrecks: 31 May 1833
Ship	State	Description
Hannah	United Kingdom	The ship ran aground near St. Ann's, Nova Scotia, British North America and was wrecked. All on board were rescued. She was on a voyage from Belfast, County Down to Quebec City, Lower Canada, British North America.

== Unknown date ==
List of shipwrecks: Unknown date in May 1833
Ship	State	Description
Inverary Castle	United Kingdom	The paddle steamer ran aground in the Clyde and was abandoned by her crew.
Magnet	United Kingdom	The ship was abandoned in the Atlantic Ocean before 21 May. Her crew were rescued by the brig Jane (United Kingdom.
Maria	United Kingdom	The ship was wrecked on the coast of Newfoundland before 24 May. Her crew were rescued by Frances and Harriet (United Kingdom). She was on a voyage from Newcastle upon Tyne, Northumberland to Miramichi, New Brunswick.
Wellington	United Kingdom	The ship was wrecked in ice. Her crew were rescued by Shannon (United Kingdom).
