= William Wilkins Glenn =

William Wilkins Glenn (July 20, 1824 - June 24, 1876) was a journalist, newspaper proprietor, and Confederate sympathizer from Baltimore, Maryland. Portions of his estate helped establish the town of Glen Burnie, Maryland.

== Biography ==
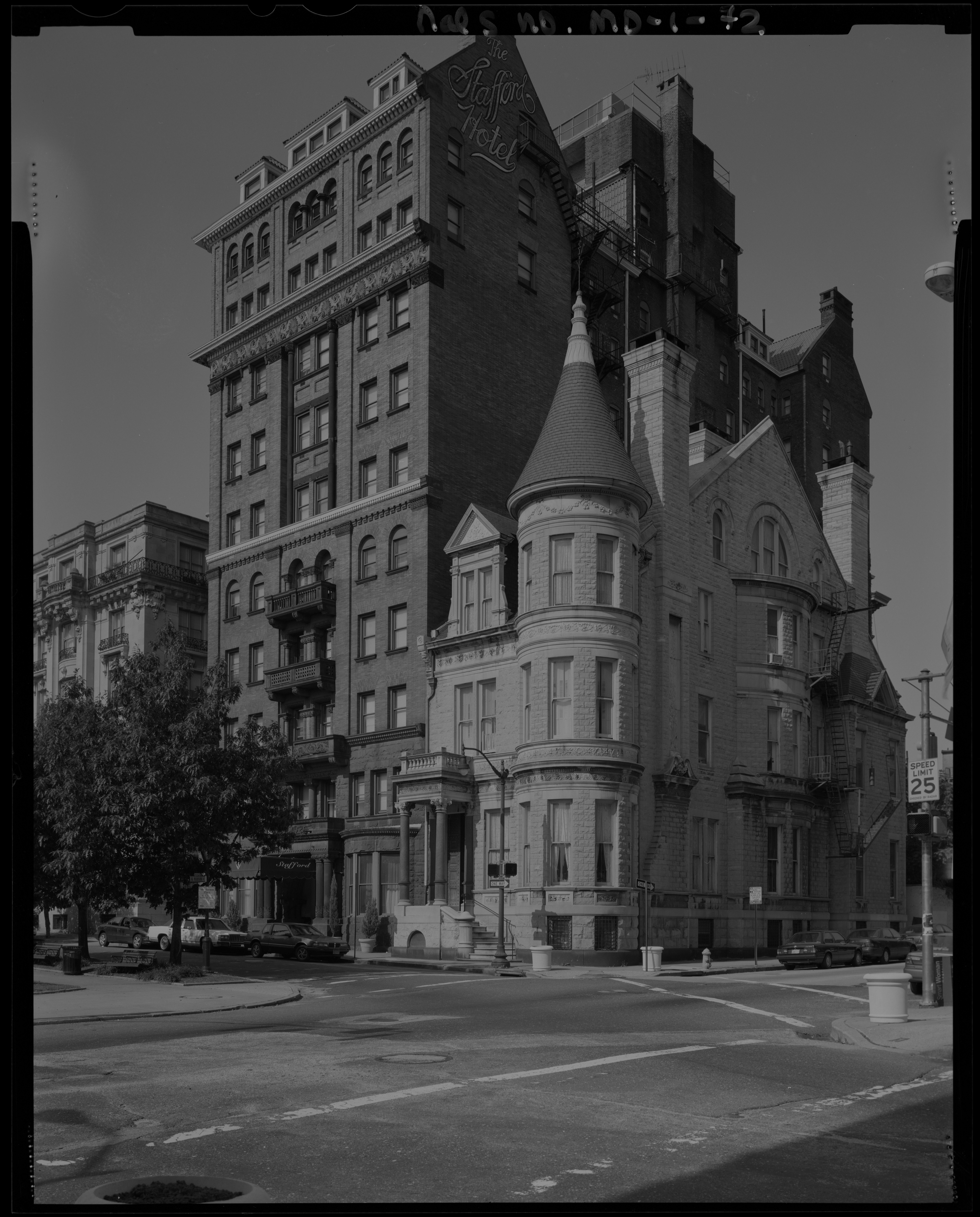
Perspective view looking southwest across Madison Street from Glenn's home in Mount Vernon Place, Charles Street, Baltimore, MD

William Wilkins Glenn, the grandson of Judge John Glenn and son of Judge Elias Glenn, was born into an influential Baltimore family. Glenn incorporated parts of the family's business property into an estate in the mid-19th century. In 1888, years after Glenn's death, these properties became part of the suburban-Baltimore town Glen Burnie.

Glenn was an active personality in the debate preceding the Civil War and active participant on behalf of the Confederacy during the war. Shortly before the start of the war, Glenn became part owner of Baltimore's Daily Exchange with the hope of spreading pro-southern public opinion throughout Maryland. The newspaper openly opposed President Abraham Lincoln's government. As a result of his Confederate sympathies and opposition to Lincoln, Glenn was imprisoned from September 14, 1861, until December 2, 1861. Glenn continued to agitate on behalf of the Confederacy, causing him to flee Maryland for England and France for portions of the war. After the war, Glenn edited the Baltimore Gazette until 1872 when he sold his interests in the paper. Glenn died at his home on the corner of Charles and Madison streets in Baltimore on June 24, 1876, from Bright's disease.

== Works and publications ==
The Baltimore gazette. (Baltimore, Md.) 1865-1875.

Glenn, William Wilkins, Bayly Ellen Marks, and Mark Norton Schatz. Between North and South: A Maryland Journalist Views the Civil War : the Narrative of William Wilkins Glenn, 1861-1869. Rutherford: Fairleigh Dickinson University Press, 1976.

Baltimore's The daily exchange. (Baltimore, Md.) 1858-1861.
