= Thomas John Morris =

American judge

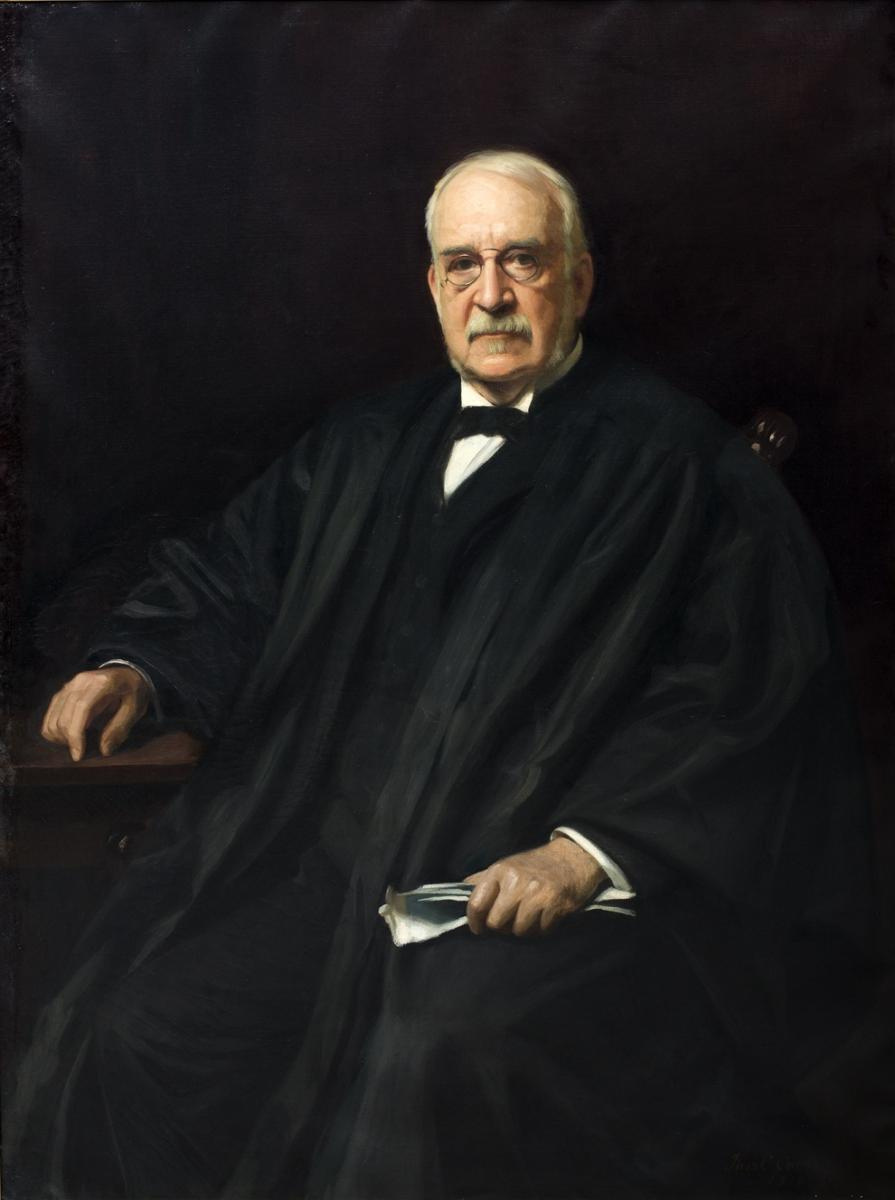

Judge of the United States District Court for the District of Maryland
- In office July 1, 1879 – June 6, 1912
- Appointed by: Rutherford B. Hayes
- Preceded by: William Fell Giles
- Succeeded by: Seat abolished

Personal details
- Born: Thomas John Morris; September 24, 1837 Baltimore, Maryland
- Died: June 6, 1912 (aged 74) Baltimore, Maryland
- Education: Harvard University (A.B.) read law

Thomas John Morris (September 24, 1837 – June 6, 1912) was a United States district judge of the United States District Court for the District of Maryland.

== Education and career ==
Born in Baltimore, Maryland, Morris received an Artium Baccalaureus degree from Harvard University in 1856 before reading law to enter the bar in 1861. He was a commissioner for the Baltimore City Government from 1856 to 1878, and was in private practice in Baltimore from 1861 to 1879.

== Federal judicial service ==
On July 1, 1879, Morris was nominated by President Rutherford B. Hayes to a seat on the United States District Court for the District of Maryland vacated by Judge William Fell Giles. Morris was confirmed by the United States Senate on July 1, 1879, and received his commission the same day. Morris served in that capacity until his death on June 6, 1912, in Baltimore. He was the last federal judge in active service to have been appointed by President Hayes.

== See also ==
- List of United States federal judges by longevity of service

== Sources ==
Legal offices
Preceded by William Fell Giles	Judge of the United States District Court for the District of Maryland; 1879–1912	Succeeded by Seat abolished
