= Henry Boyce =

American district judge

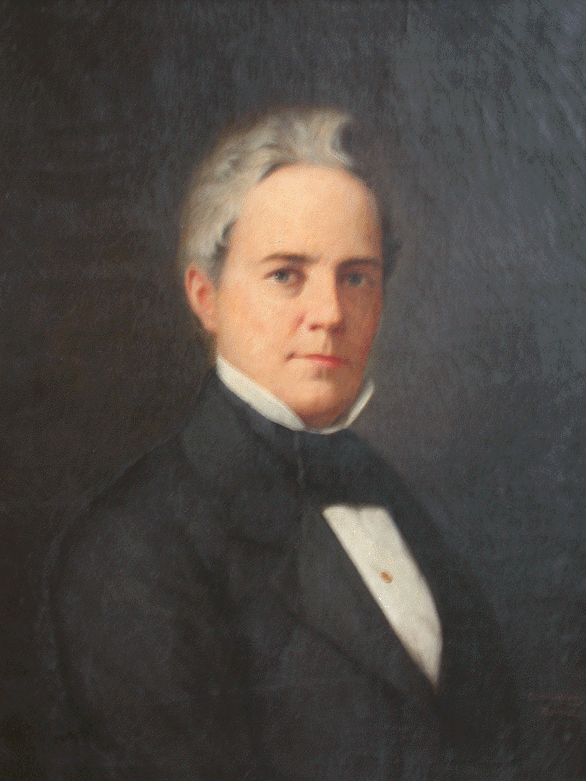
- Portrait of Boyce (circa 1860)

Judge of the United States District Court for the Western District of Louisiana
- In office May 9, 1849 – February 19, 1861
- Nominated by: Zachary Taylor
- Appointed by: Zachary Taylor (recess); Millard Fillmore (commission)
- Preceded by: Seat established by 9 Stat. 401
- Succeeded by: Seat abolished

Personal details
- Born: Henry Boyce; 1797 Derry, Kingdom of Ireland
- Died: March 1, 1873 (aged 75–76) Boyce, Louisiana
- Relatives: Powhatan Henry Clarke
- Education: read law

Henry Boyce (1797 – March 1, 1873) was a United States district judge of the United States District Court for the Western District of Louisiana.

== Education and career ==
Born in 1797 in Derry, Kingdom of Ireland, Boyce read law in 1820. He entered private practice in Bayou Leche, located in the eastern portion of modern-day New Orleans, Louisiana, until 1824. He continued private practice in Alexandria, Louisiana from 1824 to 1828. He was a planter in Rapides Parish, Louisiana from 1828 to 1849. He was a Judge of the Louisiana District Court for the Sixth and Seventh Judicial Districts from 1834 to 1839. He was the United States Attorney for the Western District of Louisiana in 1849.

== Federal judicial service ==
Boyce received a recess appointment from President Zachary Taylor on May 9, 1849, to the United States District Court for the Western District of Louisiana, to a new seat authorized by 9 Stat. 401. He was nominated to the same position by President Taylor on December 21, 1849. He was confirmed by the United States Senate on August 2, 1850, and received his commission from President Millard Fillmore the same day. His service terminated on February 19, 1861, due to his resignation.

== Later career and death ==
Following his resignation from the federal bench, Boyce resumed the occupation of planter in Rapides Parish from 1861 to 1873. He was a member of the Louisiana State Legislature in 1865. He was elected to the United States Senate from Louisiana in 1865, however the Senate refused to seat him. He died on March 1, 1873, in Boyce, Louisiana, which was named in his honor.

== Steamship explosion ==
Boyce was among the survivors of the steamboat Lioness explosion that occurred on the Red River south of Natchitoches on May 19, 1833.

== Family ==
Boyce married Irene Archinard with whom he had two children, Henry Archinard Boyce and Louise Frances Boyce. Irene died when she was 22 years old. Boyce subsequently married Octavia Mullanphy Delaney of St. Louis, with whom he had one child Mary Boyce. Powhatan Henry Clarke, West Point graduate and Medal of Honor recipient, is his grandson.

== Sources ==
Legal offices
| Preceded by Seat established by 9 Stat. 401 | Judge of the United States District Court for the Western District of Louisiana; 1849–1861 | Succeeded by Seat abolished |
