= Judicial appointment history for United States federal courts =

List of appointments to federal judgeships by court type

The appointment of federal judges for United States federal courts is done by a commission of the President of the United States, following nomination to and confirmation by the United States Senate. The tables below provide the composition of all Article III courts which include the Supreme Court and the Courts of Appeals at the end of each four year presidential term, as well as the current compositions of the District Courts and the Court of International Trade, categorizing the judges by the presidential term during which they were first appointed to their seats.

As of June 30, 2022, of the 9 justices of the Supreme Court, 6 were appointed by a Republican president, and 3 were appointed by a Democratic president.

As of November 17, 2026, of the 179 Courts of Appeals judges, 92 were appointed by Republican presidents, and 87 by Democratic presidents. Out of the 13 federal appeals courts, Democratic appointees have a majority on 7 courts, and Republican appointees have a majority on 6 courts.

As of November 20, 2026, of the 680 district court judges, 373 were appointed by Democratic presidents compared to 280 by Republican ones. Within the individual circuit jurisdictions, Democratic presidents have appointed majorities in 7 circuits, Republican presidents have appointed a majority in 4 circuits and 1 circuit is split evenly between judges appointed by Democratic presidents and judges appointed by Republican presidents.

The party of the president who appointed a judge is generally a consistent indicator of that judge's judicial philosophy and place on the political spectrum, especially in modern times, although there are cases where judges stray from their appointers. Federal judges often strategically time their retirement so as to give the president of the same party that first appointed them an opportunity to nominate the successor.

== Abbreviation key ==
Acronym	President	Term	Date range
DJT 2	Donald Trump	current	January 20, 2025 – present
JRB	Joe Biden	only	January 20, 2021 - January 20, 2025
DJT 1	Donald Trump	first	January 20, 2017 - January 20, 2021
BHO 2	Barack Obama	second	January 20, 2013 - January 20, 2017
BHO 1	Barack Obama	first	January 20, 2009 - January 20, 2013
GWB 2	George W. Bush	second	January 20, 2005 - January 20, 2009
GWB 1	George W. Bush	first	January 20, 2001 - January 20, 2005
WJC 2	Bill Clinton	second	January 20, 1997 - January 20, 2001
WJC 1	Bill Clinton	first	January 20, 1993 - January 20, 1997
GHWB	George H. W. Bush	only	January 20, 1989 - January 20, 1993
RWR 2	Ronald Reagan	second	January 20, 1985 - January 20, 1989
RWR 1	Ronald Reagan	first	January 20, 1981 - January 20, 1985
JEC	Jimmy Carter	only	January 20, 1977 - January 20, 1981
RMN/GRF	Richard Nixon and Gerald Ford	split	January 20, 1973 - January 20, 1977
RMN 1	Richard Nixon	first	January 20, 1969 - January 20, 1973
LBJ 2	Lyndon B. Johnson	second	January 20, 1965 - January 20, 1969
JFK/LBJ	John F. Kennedy and Lyndon B. Johnson	split	January 20, 1961 - January 20, 1965
DDE 2	Dwight Eisenhower	second	January 20, 1957 - January 20, 1961
DDE 1	Dwight Eisenhower	first	January 20, 1953 - January 20, 1957
HST 2	Harry Truman	second	January 20, 1949 - January 20, 1953
FDR/HST	Franklin Roosevelt and Harry Truman	split	January 20, 1945 - January 20, 1949
FDR 3	Franklin Roosevelt	third	January 20, 1941 - January 20, 1945
FDR 2	Franklin Roosevelt	second	January 20, 1937 - January 20, 1941
FDR 1	Franklin Roosevelt	first	March 4, 1933 - January 20, 1937
HCH	Herbert Hoover	only	March 4, 1929 - March 4, 1933
JCC 2	Calvin Coolidge	second	March 4, 1925 - March 4, 1929
WGH/JCC	Warren G. Harding and Calvin Coolidge	split	March 4, 1921 - March 4, 1925
TWW 2	Woodrow Wilson	second	March 4, 1917 - March 4, 1921
TWW 1	Woodrow Wilson	first	March 4, 1913 - March 4, 1917
WHT	William Howard Taft	only	March 4, 1909 - March 4, 1913
TR 2	Theodore Roosevelt	second	March 4, 1905 - March 4, 1909
WMK/TR	William McKinley and Theodore Roosevelt	split	March 4, 1901 - March 4, 1905
WMK 1	William McKinley	first	March 4, 1897 - March 4, 1901
SGC 2	Grover Cleveland	second	March 4, 1893 - March 4, 1897
BH	Benjamin Harrison	only	March 4, 1889 - March 4, 1893
SGC 1	Grover Cleveland	first	March 4, 1885 - March 4, 1889
JAG/CAA	James A. Garfield and Chester A. Arthur	split	March 4, 1881 - March 4, 1885
RBH	Rutherford B. Hayes	only	March 4, 1877 - March 4, 1881
USG 2	Ulysses S. Grant	second	March 4, 1873 - March 4, 1877
USG 1	Ulysses S. Grant	first	March 4, 1869 - March 4, 1873
AL/AJ	Abraham Lincoln and Andrew Johnson	split	March 4, 1865 - March 4, 1869
AL 1	Abraham Lincoln	first	March 4, 1861 - March 4, 1865

== Supreme Court ==
The Supreme Court of the United States was established by the Constitution of the United States. Originally, the Judiciary Act of 1789 set the number of justices at six. However, as the nation's boundaries grew across the continent and as Supreme Court justices in those days had to ride the circuit, an arduous process requiring long travel on horseback or carriage over harsh terrain that resulted in months-long extended stays away from home, Congress added justices to correspond with the growth: seven in 1807, nine in 1837, and ten in 1863. The Judicial Circuits Act of 1866 then set the number to gradually be reduced to seven through the retirement or death of current associate justices. The court was down to eight when the Judiciary Act of 1869 restored the number to nine.

As of April 7, 2022:

Year	Total	Appointed by Republicans	Appointed by Democrats	Vacant	DJT 2	JRB	DJT 1	BHO 2	BHO 1	GWB 2	GWB 1	WJC 2	WJC 1	GHWB	RWR 2	RWR 1	JEC	RMN /GRF	RMN 1	LBJ 2	JFK /LBJ	DDE 2	DDE 1
Current	9	6	3	—	—	1	3	—	2	2	—	—	—	1	—	—	—	—	—	—	—	—	—
2025	9	6	3	—	—	1	3	—	2	2	—	—	—	1	—	—	—	—	—	—	—	—	—
2021	9	6	3	—	—	—	3	—	2	2	—	—	1	1	—	—	—	—	—	—	—	—	—
2017	9	4	4	1	—	—	—	—	2	2	—	—	2	1	1	—	—	—	—	—	—	—	—
2013	9	5	4	—	—	—	—	—	2	2	—	—	2	1	2	—	—	—	—	—	—	—	—
2009	9	7	2	—	—	—	—	—	—	2	—	—	2	2	2	—	—	1	—	—	—	—	—
2005	9	7	2	—	—	—	—	—	—	—	—	—	2	2	3	1	—	1	—	—	—	—	—
2001	9	7	2	—	—	—	—	—	—	—	—	—	2	2	3	1	—	1	—	—	—	—	—
1997	9	7	2	—	—	—	—	—	—	—	—	—	2	2	3	1	—	1	—	—	—	—	—
1993	9	8	1	—	—	—	—	—	—	—	—	—	—	2	3	1	—	1	1	—	1	—	—
1989	9	7	2	—	—	—	—	—	—	—	—	—	—	—	3	1	—	1	1	1	1	—	1
1985	9	7	2	—	—	—	—	—	—	—	—	—	—	—	—	1	—	1	4	1	1	—	1
1981	9	7	2	—	—	—	—	—	—	—	—	—	—	—	—	—	—	1	4	1	1	1	1

Year	Total	Appointed by Republicans	Appointed by Democrats	Vacant	RMN /GRF	RMN 1	LBJ 2	JFK /LBJ	DDE 2	DDE 1	HST 2	FDR /HST	FDR 3	FDR 2	FDR 1	HCH	JCC 2	WGH /JCC	TWW 2	TWW 1	WHT
1977	9	7	2	—	1	4	1	1	1	1	—	—	—	—	—	—	—	—	—	—	—
1973	9	6	3	—	—	4	1	1	1	1	—	—	—	1	—	—	—	—	—	—	—
1969	9	4	5	—	—	—	2	1	1	3	—	—	—	2	—	—	—	—	—	—	—
1965	9	4	5	—	—	—	—	2	1	3	1	—	—	2	—	—	—	—	—	—	—
1961	9	5	4	—	—	—	—	—	2	3	1	—	—	3	—	—	—	—	—	—	—
1957	9	3	6	—	—	—	—	—	—	3	1	1	—	4	—	—	—	—	—	—	—
1953	9	0	9	—	—	—	—	—	—	—	2	2	1	4	—	—	—	—	—	—	—
1949	9	0	9	—	—	—	—	—	—	—	—	2	2	5	—	—	—	—	—	—	—
1945	9	2	7	—	—	—	—	—	—	—	—	—	3	5	—	1	—	—	—	—	—
1941	9	3	6	—	—	—	—	—	—	—	—	—	—	5	—	2	1	—	—	1	—
1937	9	7	2	—	—	—	—	—	—	—	—	—	—	—	—	3	1	2	—	2	1
1933	9	7	2	—	—	—	—	—	—	—	—	—	—	—	—	3	1	2	—	2	1

Year	Total	Appointed by Republicans	Appointed by Democrats	Vacant	JCC 2	WGH /JCC	TWW 2	TWW 1	WHT	TR 2	WMK /TR	WMK 1	SGC 2	BH	SGC 1	JAG /CAA	RBH	USG 2	USG 1	AL /AJ	AL 1
1929	9	7	2	—	1	4	—	2	1	—	1	—	—	—	—	—	—	—	—	—	—
1925	9	7	2	—	—	4	—	2	1	—	1	1	—	—	—	—	—	—	—	—	—
1921	9	6	3	—	—	—	—	3	3	—	2	1	—	—	—	—	—	—	—	—	—
1917	9	6	3	—	—	—	—	3	3	—	2	1	—	—	—	—	—	—	—	—	—
1913	9	9	0	—	—	—	—	—	6	—	2	1	—	—	—	—	—	—	—	—	—
1909	9	6	3	—	—	—	—	—	—	1	2	1	2	1	1	—	1	—	—	—	—
1905	9	6	3	—	—	—	—	—	—	—	2	1	2	2	1	—	1	—	—	—	—
1901	9	6	3	—	—	—	—	—	—	—	—	1	2	3	1	1	1	—	—	—	—
1897	9	6	3	—	—	—	—	—	—	—	—	—	2	3	1	1	1	—	—	—	1
1893	9	7	2	—	—	—	—	—	—	—	—	—	—	4	2	2	1	—	—	—	1
1889	9	7	2	—	—	—	—	—	—	—	—	—	—	—	2	3	1	—	1	—	2
1885	9	9	0	—	—	—	—	—	—	—	—	—	—	—	—	3	2	1	1	—	2

== Courts of appeals ==
The United States courts of appeals were established by the Judiciary Act of 1891 as "United States circuit courts of appeals" (the name was changed to its current form in 1948). The act authorized 19 appellate judgeships in 9 circuits. Since then, the number of authorized appellate judgeships has increased to 179.

=== Summary of 13 circuits combined ===
As of November 17, 2026:

Year	Total	Appointed by Republicans	Appointed by Democrats	Vacant	DJT 2	JRB	DJT 1	BHO 2	BHO 1	GWB 2	GWB 1	WJC 2	WJC 1	GHWB	RWR 2	RWR 1	JEC	RMN /GRF	RMN 1	LBJ 2	JFK /LBJ	DDE 2	DDE 1
Current	179	92	87	-	12	44	51	22	12	13	7	7	2	4	3	2	—	—	—	—	—	—	—
2025	179	88	88	3	—	44	53	22	13	15	11	7	2	4	3	2	—	—	—	—	—	—	—
2021	179	96	81	2	—	—	53	24	26	17	15	17	14	5	4	2	—	—	—	—	—	—	—
2017	179	72	90	17	—	—	—	25	28	23	26	22	14	9	7	6	1	1	—	—	—	—	—
2013	179	84	78	17	—	—	—	—	30	24	30	26	17	12	10	7	5	1	—	—	—	—	—
2009*	178	100	66	12	—	—	—	—	—	24	32	34	25	21	15	7	7	1	—	—	—	—	—
2005	179	94	69	16	—	—	—	—	—	—	35	35	25	29	20	8	9	1	1	—	—	—	—
2001	179	76	78	25	—	—	—	—	—	—	—	35	29	35	28	11	14	1	1	—	—	—	—
1997	179	105	53	21	—	—	—	—	—	—	—	—	29	40	45	14	22	3	2	1	1	1	—
1993	179	119	42	18	—	—	—	—	—	—	—	—	—	40	50	20	40	5	3	1	1	1	—
1989	168	96	62	10	—	—	—	—	—	—	—	—	—	—	50	26	53	9	10	8	1	1	—
1985	168	66	76	26	—	—	—	—	—	—	—	—	—	—	—	33	57	15	17	14	5	1	—
1981	140	50	86	4	—	—	—	—	—	—	—	—	—	—	—	—	59	16	30	19	8	2	1

- There were temporarily 178 appellate federal judgeships, due to the elimination of a 12th seat on the D.C. Circuit by Section 509 of the Court Security Improvement Act of 2007. That Act also provided for the creation of a 29th seat on the Ninth Circuit in January 2009 which increased the number of authorized appellate judgeships back to 179.

As of November 17, 2026:

Year	Total	Appointed by Republicans	Appointed by Democrats	Vacant	DJT 2	JRB	DJT 1	BHO 2	BHO 1	GWB 2	GWB 1	WJC 2	WJC 1	GHWB	RWR 2	RWR 1	JEC	RMN /GRF	RMN 1	LBJ 2	JFK /LBJ	DDE 2	DDE 1
Current	100%	51%	49%	—	7%	24%	28%	12%	7%	7%	4%	4%	1%	2%	2%	1%	—	—	—	—	—	—	—
2025	100%	49%	49%	2%	—	24%	30%	12%	7%	8%	6%	4%	1%	2%	2%	1%	—	—	—	—	—	—	—
2021	100%	54%	45%	1%	—	—	30%	13%	15%	9%	8%	9%	8%	3%	2%	1%	—	—	—	—	—	—	—
2017	100%	40%	50%	9%	—	—	—	14%	16%	13%	15%	12%	8%	5%	4%	3%	1%	1%	—	—	—	—	—
2013	100%	47%	44%	9%	—	—	—	—	17%	13%	17%	15%	9%	7%	6%	4%	3%	1%	—	—	—	—	—
2009	100%	56%	37%	7%	—	—	—	—	—	13%	18%	19%	14%	12%	8%	4%	4%	1%	—	—	—	—	—
2005	100%	53%	39%	9%	—	—	—	—	—	—	20%	20%	14%	16%	11%	4%	5%	1%	1%	—	—	—	—
2001	100%	42%	44%	14%	—	—	—	—	—	—	—	20%	16%	20%	16%	6%	8%	1%	1%	—	—	—	—
1997	100%	59%	30%	12%	—	—	—	—	—	—	—	—	16%	22%	25%	8%	12%	2%	1%	1%	1%	1%	—
1993	100%	67%	23%	10%	—	—	—	—	—	—	—	—	—	22%	28%	11%	22%	3%	2%	1%	1%	1%	—
1989	100%	57%	37%	6%	—	—	—	—	—	—	—	—	—	—	30%	16%	32%	5%	6%	5%	1%	1%	—
1985	100%	39%	45%	16%	—	—	—	—	—	—	—	—	—	—	—	20%	34%	9%	10%	8%	3%	1%	—
1981	100%	36%	61%	3%	—	—	—	—	—	—	—	—	—	—	—	—	42%	11%	21%	14%	6%	1%	1%

=== Partisan mix of the circuit courts ===
As of November 17, 2026:

Appeals Court	Total number of seats	Percentage of occupied seats appointed by Republicans	Percentage of occupied seats appointed by Democrats	Republican/ Democrat/ vacant	Percentage of total seats appointed by Republicans	Percentage of total seats appointed by Democrats	Percentage of total seats currently vacant
1st	6	17%	83%	1 / 5 / 0	17%	83%	0%
2nd	13	46%	54%	6 / 7 / 0	46%	54%	0%
3rd	14	57%	43%	8 / 6 / 0	57%	43%	0%
4th	15	40%	60%	6 / 9 / 0	40%	60%	0%
5th	17	71%	29%	12 / 5 / 0	71%	29%	0%
6th	16	63%	38%	10 / 6 / 0	63%	38%	0%
7th	11	55%	45%	6 / 5 / 0	55%	45%	0%
8th	11	91%	9%	10 / 1 / 0	91%	9%	0%
9th	29	45%	55%	13 / 16 / 0	45%	55%	0%
10th	12	42%	58%	5 / 7 / 0	42%	58%	0%
11th	12	58%	42%	7 / 5 / 0	58%	42%	0%
D.C.	11	36%	64%	4 / 7 / 0	36%	64%	0%
Federal	12	33%	67%	4 / 8 / 0	33%	67%	0%
Total of 13 circuits	179	51%	49%	92 / 87 / 0	51%	49%	0%

=== First Circuit ===
as of November 4, 2025:

Year	Total	Appointed by Republicans	Appointed by Democrats	Vacant	DJT 2	JRB	DJT 1	BHO 2	BHO 1	GWB 2	GWB 1	WJC 2	WJC 1	GHWB	RWR 2	RWR 1	JEC	RMN /GRF	RMN 1	LBJ 2
Current	6	1	5	—	1	4	—	1	—	—	—	—	—	—	—	—	—	—	—	—
2025	6	0	5	1	—	4	—	1	—	—	—	—	—	—	—	—	—	—	—	—
2021	6	1	4	1	—	—	—	2	1	—	1	—	1	—	—	—	—	—	—	—
2017	6	2	4	—	—	—	—	2	1	—	1	—	1	—	—	1	—	—	—	—
2013	6	3	2	1	—	—	—	—	1	—	1	—	1	1	—	1	—	—	—	—
2009	6	3	2	1	—	—	—	—	—	—	1	1	1	1	—	1	—	—	—	—
2005	6	4	2	—	—	—	—	—	—	—	1	1	1	1	1	1	—	—	—	—
2001	6	4	2	—	—	—	—	—	—	—	—	1	1	2	1	1	—	—	—	—
1997	6	5	1	—	—	—	—	—	—	—	—	—	1	3	1	1	—	—	—	—
1993	6	5	1	—	—	—	—	—	—	—	—	—	—	3	1	1	1	—	—	—
1989	6	3	3	—	—	—	—	—	—	—	—	—	—	—	1	1	2	—	1	1
1985	6	2	3	1	—	—	—	—	—	—	—	—	—	—	—	1	2	—	1	1
1981	4	1	3	—	—	—	—	—	—	—	—	—	—	—	—	—	2	—	1	1

=== Second Circuit ===
as of July 14, 2026:

Year	Total	Appointed by Republicans	Appointed by Democrats	Vacant	DJT 2	JRB	DJT 1	BHO 2	BHO 1	GWB 2	GWB 1	WJC 2	WJC 1	GHWB	RWR 2	RWR 1	JEC	RMN /GRF	RMN 1	LBJ 2	JFK /LBJ
Current	13	6	7	—	1	6	5	—	1	—	—	—	—	—	—	—	—	—	—	—	—
2025	13	6	7	—	—	6	5	—	1	1	—	—	—	—	—	—	—	—	—	—	—
2021	13	7	6	—	—	—	5	—	3	1	1	2	1	—	—	—	—	—	—	—	—
2017	13	4	7	2	—	—	—	—	4	1	2	2	1	1	—	—	—	—	—	—	—
2013	13	5	8	—	—	—	—	—	5	1	3	2	1	1	—	—	—	—	—	—	—
2009	13	6	6	1	—	—	—	—	—	1	4	4	2	1	—	—	—	—	—	—	—
2005	13	6	7	—	—	—	—	—	—	—	4	5	2	2	—	—	—	—	—	—	—
2001	13	2	10	1	—	—	—	—	—	—	—	5	4	2	—	—	1	—	—	—	—
1997	13	5	6	2	—	—	—	—	—	—	—	—	4	3	1	1	2	—	—	—	—
1993	13	10	2	1	—	—	—	—	—	—	—	—	—	3	3	3	2	1	—	—	—
1989	13	9	3	1	—	—	—	—	—	—	—	—	—	—	3	4	2	1	1	1	—
1985	13	7	4	2	—	—	—	—	—	—	—	—	—	—	—	4	2	2	1	1	1
1981	11	6	4	1	—	—	—	—	—	—	—	—	—	—	—	—	2	2	4	1	1

=== Third Circuit ===
as of October 9, 2025:

Year	Total	Appointed by Republicans	Appointed by Democrats	Vacant	DJT 2	JRB	DJT 1	BHO 2	BHO 1	GWB 2	GWB 1	WJC 2	WJC 1	GHWB	RWR 2	RWR 1	JEC	RMN /GRF	RMN 1	LBJ 2
Current	14	8	6	—	2	3	4	3	—	2	—	—	—	—	—	—	—	—	—	—
2025	14	6	6	2	—	3	4	3	—	2	—	—	—	—	—	—	—	—	—	—
2021	14	8	6	—	—	—	4	3	1	3	1	1	1	—	—	—	—	—	—	—
2017	14	5	7	2	—	—	—	3	2	3	2	1	1	—	—	—	—	—	—	—
2013	14	6	7	1	—	—	—	—	2	3	2	3	1	—	1	—	1	—	—	—
2009	14	6	6	2	—	—	—	—	—	3	2	4	1	—	1	—	1	—	—	—
2005	14	7	6	1	—	—	—	—	—	—	4	4	1	2	1	—	1	—	—	—
2001	14	6	6	2	—	—	—	—	—	—	—	4	1	2	3	1	1	—	—	—
1997	14	11	2	1	—	—	—	—	—	—	—	—	1	3	7	1	1	—	—	—
1993	14	11	1	2	—	—	—	—	—	—	—	—	—	3	7	1	1	—	—	—
1989	12	9	3	—	—	—	—	—	—	—	—	—	—	—	7	1	2	—	1	1
1985	12	6	4	2	—	—	—	—	—	—	—	—	—	—	—	1	2	1	4	2
1981	10	6	4	—	—	—	—	—	—	—	—	—	—	—	—	—	2	1	5	2

=== Fourth Circuit ===
as of March 19, 2024:

Year	Total	Appointed by Republicans	Appointed by Democrats	Vacant	DJT 2	JRB	DJT 1	BHO 2	BHO 1	GWB 2	GWB 1	WJC 2	WJC 1	GHWB	RWR 2	RWR 1	JEC	RMN /GRF	RMN 1	LBJ 2	JFK /LBJ	DDE 2
Current	15	6	9	—	—	3	3	1	3	1	—	2	—	1	—	1	—	—	—	—	—	—
2025	15	6	9	—	—	3	3	1	3	1	—	2	—	1	—	1	—	—	—	—	—	—
2021	15	6	9	—	—	—	3	1	5	1	—	2	1	1	—	1	—	—	—	—	—	—
2017	15	5	10	—	—	—	—	1	5	1	2	3	1	1	—	1	—	—	—	—	—	—
2013	15	5	10	—	—	—	—	—	6	1	2	3	1	1	—	1	—	—	—	—	—	—
2009	15	6	5	4	—	—	—	—	—	1	2	3	2	2	—	1	—	—	—	—	—	—
2005	15	8	5	2	—	—	—	—	—	—	2	3	2	3	1	1	—	—	1	—	—	—
2001	15	6	5	4	—	—	—	—	—	—	—	3	2	3	1	1	—	—	1	—	—	—
1997	15	9	4	2	—	—	—	—	—	—	—	—	2	4	1	1	2	1	2	—	—	—
1993	15	9	3	3	—	—	—	—	—	—	—	—	—	4	1	1	3	1	2	—	—	—
1989	11	6	5	—	—	—	—	—	—	—	—	—	—	—	1	2	4	1	2	1	—	—
1985	11	6	5	—	—	—	—	—	—	—	—	—	—	—	—	3	4	1	2	1	—	—
1981	10	4	6	—	—	—	—	—	—	—	—	—	—	—	—	—	4	1	2	2	—	1

- Roger Gregory, who was given a one-year recess appointment in Bill Clinton's second term and was subsequently given a lifetime appointment in George W. Bush's first term, is counted as a Clinton appointee on this page.

=== Fifth Circuit ===
as of November 17, 2026:

Year	Total	Appointed by Republicans	Appointed by Democrats	Vacant	DJT 2	JRB	DJT 1	BHO 2	BHO 1	GWB 2	GWB 1	WJC 2	WJC 1	GHWB	RWR 2	RWR 1	JEC	RMN /GRF	RMN 1	LBJ 2	JFK /LBJ	DDE 2	DDE 1
Current	17	12	5	—	1	2	5	—	2	4	—	—	1	—	2	—	—	—	—	—	—	—	—
2025	17	12	5	—	—	2	6	—	2	4	—	—	1	—	2	—	—	—	—	—	—	—	—
2021	17	12	5	—	—	—	6	1	2	4	—	—	2	—	2	—	—	—	—	—	—	—	—
2017	17	9	5	3	—	—	—	1	2	4	2	—	2	—	2	1	—	—	—	—	—	—	—
2013	17	10	5	2	—	—	—	—	2	4	2	—	2	—	2	2	1	—	—	—	—	—	—
2009	17	13	4	—	—	—	—	—	—	4	2	—	3	3	2	2	1	—	—	—	—	—	—
2005	17	11	4	2	—	—	—	—	—	—	2	—	3	4	2	3	1	—	—	—	—	—	—
2001	17	9	5	3	—	—	—	—	—	—	—	—	4	4	2	3	1	—	—	—	—	—	—
1997	17	11	6	—	—	—	—	—	—	—	—	—	4	4	3	4	2	—	—	—	—	—	—
1993	17	11	2	4	—	—	—	—	—	—	—	—	—	4	3	4	2	—	—	—	—	—	—
1989	16	9	6	1	—	—	—	—	—	—	—	—	—	—	3	4	6	1	1	—	—	—	—
1985	16	7	7	2	—	—	—	—	—	—	—	—	—	—	—	5	7	1	1	—	—	—	—
1981	14	3	10	1	—	—	—	—	—	—	—	—	—	—	—	—	8	1	1	2	—	—	1

- The 5th Circuit judges who were transferred to the 11th Circuit in late 1981 are not included in the 5th Circuit numbers for 1981 for trend comparison purposes.

=== Sixth Circuit ===
as of July 22, 2026:

Year	Total	Appointed by Republicans	Appointed by Democrats	Vacant	DJT 2	JRB	DJT 1	BHO 2	BHO 1	GWB 2	GWB 1	WJC 2	WJC 1	GHWB	RWR 2	RWR 1	JEC	RMN /GRF	RMN 1	LBJ 2	JFK /LBJ	DDE 2
Current	16	10	6	—	2	4	6	—	—	2	—	1	1	—	—	—	—	—	—	—	—	—
2025	16	9	7	—	—	4	6	—	1	2	1	1	1	—	—	—	—	—	—	—	—	—
2021	16	11	5	—	—	—	6	—	2	3	2	1	2	—	—	—	—	—	—	—	—	—
2017	16	10	5	1	—	—	—	—	2	4	4	1	2	1	1	—	—	—	—	—	—	—
2013	16	10	6	—	—	—	—	—	2	4	4	1	2	1	1	—	1	—	—	—	—	—
2009	16	10	6	—	—	—	—	—	—	4	4	2	3	1	1	—	1	—	—	—	—	—
2005	16	6	6	4	—	—	—	—	—	—	4	2	3	1	1	—	1	—	—	—	—	—
2001	16	5	7	4	—	—	—	—	—	—	—	2	3	3	2	—	2	—	—	—	—	—
1997	16	7	6	3	—	—	—	—	—	—	—	—	3	3	4	—	3	—	—	—	—	—
1993	16	9	5	2	—	—	—	—	—	—	—	—	—	3	5	1	5	—	—	—	—	—
1989	16	10	5	1	—	—	—	—	—	—	—	—	—	—	5	3	5	1	1	—	—	—
1985	16	6	6	4	—	—	—	—	—	—	—	—	—	—	—	4	5	1	1	—	1	—
1981	11	3	7	1	—	—	—	—	—	—	—	—	—	—	—	—	6	1	1	—	1	1

=== Seventh Circuit ===
as of October 27, 2025:

Year	Total	Appointed by Republicans	Appointed by Democrats	Vacant	DJT 2	JRB	DJT 1	BHO 2	BHO 1	GWB 2	GWB 1	WJC 2	WJC 1	GHWB	RWR 2	RWR 1	JEC	RMN /GRF	RMN 1	LBJ 2	JFK /LBJ
Current	11	6	5	—	1	5	4	—	—	—	—	—	—	—	1	—	—	—	—	—	—
2025	11	6	5	—	—	5	4	—	—	—	1	—	—	—	1	—	—	—	—	—	—
2021	11	8	2	1	—	—	4	—	1	—	1	—	1	1	2	—	—	—	—	—	—
2017	11	6	3	2	—	—	—	—	1	—	1	1	1	1	2	2	—	—	—	—	—
2013	11	7	3	1	—	—	—	—	1	1	1	1	1	1	2	2	—	—	—	—	—
2009	11	7	3	1	—	—	—	—	—	1	1	1	2	1	2	2	—	—	—	—	—
2005	11	8	3	—	—	—	—	—	—	—	1	1	2	1	4	2	—	—	—	—	—
2001	11	8	3	—	—	—	—	—	—	—	—	1	2	1	4	3	—	—	—	—	—
1997	11	8	3	—	—	—	—	—	—	—	—	—	2	1	4	3	—	—	—	1	—
1993	11	9	2	—	—	—	—	—	—	—	—	—	—	1	4	3	1	1	—	1	—
1989	11	9	2	—	—	—	—	—	—	—	—	—	—	—	4	3	1	2	—	1	—
1985	11	6	2	3	—	—	—	—	—	—	—	—	—	—	—	4	1	2	—	1	—
1981	9	4	4	1	—	—	—	—	—	—	—	—	—	—	—	—	1	2	2	2	1

=== Eighth Circuit ===
as of July 23, 2026:

Year	Total	Appointed by Republicans	Appointed by Democrats	Vacant	DJT 2	JRB	DJT 1	BHO 2	BHO 1	GWB 2	GWB 1	WJC 2	WJC 1	GHWB	RWR 2	RWR 1	JEC	RMN /GRF	RMN 1	LBJ 2
Current	11	10	1	—	2	—	3	1	—	1	3	—	—	1	—	—	—	—	—	—
2025	11	10	1	—	—	—	4	1	—	1	4	—	—	1	—	—	—	—	—	—
2021	11	10	1	—	—	—	4	1	—	1	4	—	—	1	—	—	—	—	—	—
2017	11	8	1	2	—	—	—	1	—	1	5	—	—	1	1	—	—	—	—	—
2013	11	9	2	—	—	—	—	—	—	1	6	1	1	1	1	—	—	—	—	—
2009	11	9	2	—	—	—	—	—	—	1	6	1	1	1	1	—	—	—	—	—
2005	11	9	2	—	—	—	—	—	—	—	6	1	1	2	1	—	—	—	—	—
2001	11	6	4	1	—	—	—	—	—	—	—	1	1	3	2	1	2	—	—	—
1997	11	8	3	—	—	—	—	—	—	—	—	—	1	3	3	2	2	—	—	—
1993	11	9	2	—	—	—	—	—	—	—	—	—	—	3	3	3	2	—	—	—
1989	10	6	3	1	—	—	—	—	—	—	—	—	—	—	3	3	2	—	—	1
1985	10	4	5	1	—	—	—	—	—	—	—	—	—	—	—	3	2	—	1	3
1981	9	3	5	1	—	—	—	—	—	—	—	—	—	—	—	—	2	1	2	3

=== Ninth Circuit ===
as of November 5, 2025:

Year	Total	Appointed by Republicans	Appointed by Democrats	Vacant	DJT 2	JRB	DJT 1	BHO 2	BHO 1	GWB 2	GWB 1	WJC 2	WJC 1	GHWB	RWR 2	RWR 1	JEC	RMN /GRF	RMN 1	LBJ 2	JFK /LBJ
Current	29	13	16	—	1	8	10	2	3	1	1	3	—	—	—	—	—	—	—	—	—
2025	29	13	16	—	—	8	10	2	3	2	1	3	—	—	—	—	—	—	—	—	—
2021	29	13	16	—	—	—	10	2	5	2	1	8	1	—	—	—	—	—	—	—	—
2017	29	7	18	4	—	—	—	2	5	3	3	9	1	—	1	—	1	—	—	—	—
2013	29	9	19	1	—	—	—	—	5	3	4	11	1	—	2	—	2	—	—	—	—
2009	28	11	16	1	—	—	—	—	—	3	4	11	2	2	2	—	3	—	—	—	—
2005	28	8	16	4	—	—	—	—	—	—	4	11	2	2	2	—	3	—	—	—	—
2001	28	7	18	3	—	—	—	—	—	—	—	11	3	4	3	—	4	—	—	—	—
1997	28	11	9	8	—	—	—	—	—	—	—	—	3	4	7	—	5	—	—	—	1
1993	28	15	12	1	—	—	—	—	—	—	—	—	—	4	7	3	11	—	1	—	1
1989	28	12	13	3	—	—	—	—	—	—	—	—	—	—	7	3	12	—	2	—	1
1985	28	8	16	4	—	—	—	—	—	—	—	—	—	—	—	3	15	3	2	—	1
1981	23	7	16	—	—	—	—	—	—	—	—	—	—	—	—	—	15	3	4	—	1

=== Tenth Circuit ===
As of November 16, 2026:

Year	Total	Appointed by Republicans	Appointed by Democrats	Vacant	DJT 2	JRB	DJT 1	BHO 2	BHO 1	GWB 2	GWB 1	WJC 2	WJC 1	GHWB	RWR 2	RWR 1	JEC	RMN /GRF	RMN 1	LBJ 2	JFK /LBJ
Current	12	5	7	—	1	2	2	4	1	1	1	—	—	—	—	—	—	—	—	—	—
2025	12	5	7	—	—	2	2	4	1	1	2	—	—	—	—	—	—	—	—	—	—
2021	12	5	7	—	—	—	2	4	1	1	2	—	2	—	—	—	—	—	—	—	—
2017	12	5	7	—	—	—	—	4	1	2	2	—	2	1	—	—	—	—	—	—	—
2013	12	6	3	3	—	—	—	—	1	2	3	—	2	1	—	—	—	—	—	—	—
2009	12	8	4	—	—	—	—	—	—	2	4	—	4	1	1	—	—	—	—	—	—
2005	12	7	5	—	—	—	—	—	—	—	4	—	4	1	2	—	1	—	—	—	—
2001	12	5	5	2	—	—	—	—	—	—	—	—	4	1	4	—	1	—	—	—	—
1997	12	7	5	—	—	—	—	—	—	—	—	—	4	1	6	—	1	—	—	—	—
1993	12	7	3	2	—	—	—	—	—	—	—	—	—	1	6	—	3	—	—	—	—
1989	10	6	4	—	—	—	—	—	—	—	—	—	—	—	6	—	3	—	—	1	—
1985	10	1	4	5	—	—	—	—	—	—	—	—	—	—	—	—	3	—	1	1	—
1981	8	3	5	—	—	—	—	—	—	—	—	—	—	—	—	—	3	—	3	1	1

=== Eleventh Circuit ===
As of November 18, 2024:

Year	Total	Appointed by Republicans	Appointed by Democrats	Vacant	DJT 2	JRB	DJT 1	BHO 2	BHO 1	GWB 2	GWB 1	WJC 2	WJC 1	GHWB	RWR 2	RWR 1	JEC	RMN /GRF	RMN 1	LBJ 2
Current	12	7	5	—	—	2	6	2	1	—	1	—	—	—	—	—	—	—	—	—
2025	12	7	5	—	—	2	6	2	1	—	1	—	—	—	—	—	—	—	—	—
2021	12	7	5	—	—	—	6	2	2	—	1	1	—	—	—	—	—	—	—	—
2017	12	3	8	1	—	—	—	3	2	—	1	3	—	1	—	—	—	1	—	—
2013	12	4	6	2	—	—	—	—	2	—	1	3	1	2	—	—	—	1	—	—
2009	12	7	5	—	—	—	—	—	—	—	1	3	1	4	1	—	1	1	—	—
2005	12	7	5	—	—	—	—	—	—	—	1	3	1	4	1	—	1	1	—	—
2001	12	6	5	1	—	—	—	—	—	—	—	3	1	4	1	—	1	1	—	—
1997	12	8	2	2	—	—	—	—	—	—	—	—	1	4	2	—	1	2	—	—
1993	12	8	3	1	—	—	—	—	—	—	—	—	—	4	2	—	3	2	—	—
1989	12	6	6	—	—	—	—	—	—	—	—	—	—	—	2	—	6	3	1	—
1985	12	4	8	—	—	—	—	—	—	—	—	—	—	—	—	—	7	3	1	1
1981	12	4	8	—	—	—	—	—	—	—	—	—	—	—	—	—	7	3	1	1

- The 11th Circuit was created in 1981. The judges that were transferred from the 5th Circuit to the 11th Circuit are shown in 1981 for trend comparison purposes.

=== D.C. Circuit ===
as of May 15, 2023:

Year	Total	Appointed by Republicans	Appointed by Democrats	Vacant	DJT 2	JRB	DJT 1	BHO 2	BHO 1	GWB 2	GWB 1	WJC 2	WJC 1	GHWB	RWR 2	RWR 1	JEC	RMN /GRF	RMN 1	LBJ 2	JFK /LBJ
Current	11	4	7	—	—	3	3	4	—	—	—	—	—	1	—	—	—	—	—	—	—
2025	11	4	7	—	—	3	3	4	—	—	—	—	—	1	—	—	—	—	—	—	—
2021	11	4	7	—	—	—	3	4	—	—	—	1	2	1	—	—	—	—	—	—	—
2017	11	4	7	—	—	—	—	4	—	3	—	1	2	1	—	—	—	—	—	—	—
2013	11	5	3	3	—	—	—	—	—	3	—	1	2	1	1	—	—	—	—	—	—
2009	11	6	3	2	—	—	—	—	—	3	—	1	2	1	2	—	—	—	—	—	—
2005	12	5	4	3	—	—	—	—	—	—	1	1	2	2	2	—	1	—	—	—	—
2001	12	5	4	3	—	—	—	—	—	—	—	1	2	2	3	—	1	—	—	—	—
1997	12	6	4	2	—	—	—	—	—	—	—	—	2	2	4	—	2	—	—	—	—
1993	12	7	4	1	—	—	—	—	—	—	—	—	—	2	5	—	4	—	—	—	—
1989	12	6	5	1	—	—	—	—	—	—	—	—	—	—	5	1	4	—	—	1	—
1985	12	3	7	2	—	—	—	—	—	—	—	—	—	—	—	3	4	—	—	2	1
1981	11	3	8	—	—	—	—	—	—	—	—	—	—	—	—	—	4	—	3	2	2

=== Federal Circuit ===
as of March 16, 2022:

Year	Total	Appointed by Republicans	Appointed by Democrats	Vacant	DJT 2	JRB	DJT 1	BHO 2	BHO 1	GWB 2	GWB 1	WJC 2	WJC 1	GHWB	RWR 2	RWR 1	JEC	RMN /GRF	RMN 1	LBJ 2	JFK /LBJ	DDE 2
Current	12	4	8	—	—	2	—	4	1	1	1	1	—	1	—	1	—	—	—	—	—	—
2025	12	4	8	—	—	2	—	4	1	1	1	1	—	1	—	1	—	—	—	—	—	—
2021	12	4	8	—	—	—	—	4	3	1	1	1	—	1	—	1	—	—	—	—	—	—
2017	12	4	8	—	—	—	—	4	3	1	1	1	—	1	—	1	—	—	—	—	—	—
2013	12	5	4	3	—	—	—	—	3	1	1	1	—	2	—	1	—	—	—	—	—	—
2009	12	8	4	—	—	—	—	—	—	1	1	3	1	3	2	1	—	—	—	—	—	—
2005	12	8	4	—	—	—	—	—	—	—	1	3	1	4	2	1	—	—	—	—	—	—
2001	12	7	4	1	—	—	—	—	—	—	—	3	1	4	2	1	—	—	—	—	—	—
1997	12	10	1	1	—	—	—	—	—	—	—	—	1	5	3	1	—	—	—	—	—	1
1993	12	10	1	1	—	—	—	—	—	—	—	—	—	5	3	1	1	—	—	—	—	1
1989	12	7	3	2	—	—	—	—	—	—	—	—	—	—	3	2	3	—	1	—	—	1
1985	12	7	5	—	—	—	—	—	—	—	—	—	—	—	—	2	3	1	3	1	1	1
1981	11	6	5	—	—	—	—	—	—	—	—	—	—	—	—	—	3	1	4	1	1	1

- The Federal Circuit was created in 1982. The judges from the courts that were combined into the Federal Circuit are shown in 1981 for trend comparison purposes.

== District courts ==
=== Summary of 91 district courts ===
as of November 20, 2026:

Year	Total	Appointed by Republicans	Appointed by Democrats	Vacant	DJT 2	JRB	DJT 1	BHO 2	BHO 1	GWB 2	GWB 1	WJC 2	WJC 1	GHWB	RWR 2	RWR 1	JEC	RMN /GRF	RMN	LBJ 2
Current	680	280	373	27	47	183	168	104	69	33	25	10	7	2	4	1	—	—	—	—
2025	679	256	385	38	—	183	170	109	76	42	34	10	7	4	4	2	—	—	—	—
2021	678	318	317	43	—	—	173	124	136	64	64	34	22	7	6	4	1	—	—	—
2017	678	242	347	89	—	—	—	126	138	87	120	47	33	18	11	5	2	1	—	1
2013	679	324	290	65	—	—	—	—	141	89	154	80	63	47	24	8	5	1	1	1
2009	680	373	267	40	—	—	—	—	—	93	162	129	126	69	35	12	11	1	1	1
2005	680	350	309	21	—	—	—	—	—	—	169	134	152	98	56	22	22	3	2	1
2001	669	271	340	58	—	—	—	—	—	—	—	136	167	133	91	39	36	5	3	1

- Congress has authorized 680 district judgeships including 676 Article III judgeships for the 50 States, the District of Columbia, and Puerto Rico plus 4 Article IV judgeships for Guam, Northern Marianas, and the Virgin Islands. The 676 Article III judgeships include 666 permanent and 10 temporary judgeships.
- However, the number of total authorized Article III District Judge positions is currently higher than 676 (681 in 2023) because four judges are authorized to serve a collective five additional judicial districts: one two-District (Trump-nominated) Judge in the Sixth, two two-District (one Obama-nominated & one Trump-nominated) Judges in the Eighth, and one three-district (Trump-nominated) Judge in the Tenth Circuit – see individual districts below for more details. Table above includes these additional districts. For example as of 10/1/2016 President Trump had appointed 174 District Judges in his first term plus 4 additional districts minus 9 judges leaving service equals 169 active judges.

=== Partisan mix of the district courts ===
as of November 20, 2026:

District courts under the appeals court	Total number of seats	Percentage of occupied seats appointed by Republicans	Percentage of occupied seats appointed by Democrats	Republican/ Democrat/ vacant	Percentage of total seats appointed by Republicans	Percentage of total seats appointed by Democrats	Percentage of total seats currently vacant
1st	29	23%	77%	6 / 20 / 3	21%	69%	10%
2nd	62	19%	81%	11 / 47 / 4	18%	76%	6%
3rd	59	36%	64%	21 / 38 / 0	36%	64%	0%
4th	56	50%	50%	27 / 27 / 2	48%	48%	4%
5th	83	65%	35%	51 / 28 / 4	61%	34%	5%
6th	63	56%	44%	34 / 27 / 2	54%	43%	3%
7th	48	38%	62%	18 / 29 / 1	38%	60%	2%
8th	44	48%	52%	20 / 22 / 2	45%	50%	5%
9th	110	21%	79%	23 / 84 / 3	21%	76%	3%
10th	41	54%	46%	20 / 17 / 4	49%	41%	10%
11th	70	66%	34%	45 / 23 / 2	64%	33%	3%
D.C.	15	27%	73%	4 / 11 / 0	27%	73%	0%
Total of 91 District Courts	680	43%	57%	280 / 373 / 27	41%	55%	4%

=== District courts in the First Circuit ===
As of October 11, 2025:

District	Total	Appointed by Republicans	Appointed by Democrats	Vacant	DJT 2	JRB	DJT 1	BHO 2	BHO 1	GWB 2	GWB 1	WJC 2	WJC 1
D. of Maine	3	1	1	1	—	1	1	—	—	—	—	—	—
D. of Massachusetts	13	—	11	2	—	5	—	4	1	—	—	—	1
D. of New Hampshire	3	1	2	—	—	1	—	1	—	1	—	—	—
D. of Puerto Rico	7	3	4	—	—	3	2	1	—	1	—	—	—
D. of Rhode Island	3	1	2	—	—	1	1	—	1	—	—	—	—
Total	29	6	20	3	—	11	4	6	2	2	—	—	1

=== District courts in the Second Circuit ===
as of November 3, 2025:

District	Total	Appointed by Republicans	Appointed by Democrats	Vacant	DJT 2	JRB	DJT 1	BHO 2	BHO 1	GWB 2	GWB 1	WJC 2	WJC 1
D. of Connecticut	8	1	6	1	—	4	1	1	1	—	—	—	—
E.D. of New York	15	4	11	—	—	7	4	3	1	—	—	—	—
N.D. of New York	5	—	5	—	—	3	—	1	1	—	—	—	—
S.D. of New York	28	5	20	3	—	7	4	5	6	—	1	1	1
W.D. of New York	4	1	3	—	—	1	1	2	—	—	—	—	—
D. of Vermont	2	—	2	—	—	1	—	—	1	—	—	—	—
Total	62	11	47	4	—	23	10	12	10	—	1	1	1

=== District courts in the Third Circuit ===
as of July 23, 2026:

District	Total	Appointed by Republicans	Appointed by Democrats	Vacant	DJT 2	JRB	DJT 1	BHO 2	BHO 1	GWB 2	GWB 1
D. of Delaware	4	2	2	—	—	2	2	—	—	—	—
D. of New Jersey	17	2	15	—	—	10	—	2	3	2	—
E.D. of Pennsylvania	22	8	14	—	1	7	5	7	—	—	2
M.D. of Pennsylvania	6	1	5	—	—	4	1	—	1	—	—
W.D. of Pennsylvania	10	8	2	—	—	—	8	—	2	—	—
Total	59	21	38	—	1	23	16	9	6	2	2

=== District courts in the Fourth Circuit ===
As of October 1, 2026:

District	Total	Appointed by Republicans	Appointed by Democrats	Vacant	DJT 2	JRB	DJT 1	BHO 2	BHO 1	GWB 2	GWB 1	WJC 2	WJC 1	GHWB	RWR 2	RWR 1
D. of Maryland	10	1	9	—	—	6	1	2	1	—	—	—	—	—	—	—
E.D. of North Carolina	4	4	—	—	—	—	1	—	—	1	1	—	—	—	—	1
M.D. of North Carolina	4	4	—	—	2	—	—	—	—	2	—	—	—	—	—	—
W.D. of North Carolina	5	4	1	—	2	—	1	—	1	1	—	—	—	—	—	—
D. of South Carolina	10	5	4	1	1	1	3	1	2	—	—	—	—	1	—	—
E.D. of Virginia	11	4	6	1	—	4	3	1	—	1	—	—	1	—	—	—
W.D. of Virginia	4	1	3	—	—	2	1	1	—	—	—	—	—	—	—	—
N.D. of West Virginia	3	2	1	—	—	—	1	—	1	1	—	—	—	—	—	—
S.D. of West Virginia	5	2	3	—	—	—	1	—	1	1	—	1	1	—	—	—
Total	56	27	27	2	5	13	12	5	6	7	1	1	2	1	—	1

=== District courts in the Fifth Circuit ===
As of November 20, 2026:

District	Total	Appointed by Republicans	Appointed by Democrats	Vacant	DJT 2	JRB	DJT 1	BHO 2	BHO 1	GWB 2	GWB 1	WJC 2	WJC 1	GHWB	RWR 2
E.D. of Louisiana	12	5	5	2	1	2	3	—	3	—	1	—	—	—	—
M.D. of Louisiana	3	—	3	—	—	—	—	2	1	—	—	—	—	—	—
W.D. of Louisiana	7	6	1	—	1	1	4	—	—	—	1	—	—	—	—
N.D. of Mississippi	3	2	1	—	2	—	—	1	—	—	—	—	—	—	—
S.D. of Mississippi	6	5	1	—	—	—	2	—	1	2	—	—	—	—	1
E.D. of Texas	8	5	3	—	—	—	4	2	1	—	1	—	—	—	—
N.D. of Texas	12	10	1	1	2	—	6	—	—	1	1	1	—	—	—
S.D. of Texas	19	11	8	—	5	1	5	3	3	—	1	1	—	—	—
W.D. of Texas	13	7	5	1	2	2	2	1	—	—	3	—	2	—	—
Total	83	51	28	4	13	6	26	9	9	3	8	2	2	—	1

=== District courts in the Sixth Circuit ===
As of October 5, 2026:

District	Total	Appointed by Republicans	Appointed by Democrats	Vacant	DJT 2	JRB	DJT 1	BHO 2	BHO 1	GWB 2	GWB 1	WJC 2	WJC 1
E.D. of Kentucky	6	5	—	1	1	—	2	—	—	—	2	—	—
W.D. of Kentucky	5	3	2	—	—	—	3	2	—	—	—	—	—
E.D. of Michigan	15	3	12	—	1	6	—	4	2	2	—	—	—
W.D. of Michigan	4	3	1	—	—	1	1	—	—	2	—	—	—
N.D. of Ohio	11	6	5	—	1	3	3	—	2	1	1	—	—
S.D. of Ohio	8	5	3	—	1	1	4	—	—	—	—	1	1
E.D. of Tennessee	5	3	1	1	—	—	3	1	—	—	—	—	—
M.D. of Tennessee	4	2	2	—	—	—	2	1	—	—	—	1	—
W.D. of Tennessee	5	4	1	—	1	—	2	1	—	1	—	—	—
Total	63	34	27	2	5	11	20	9	4	6	3	2	1

Note: Judge Claria Horn Boom (Trump appointee) currently serves both the Eastern & Western Districts of Kentucky

=== District courts in the Seventh Circuit ===
As of October 1, 2026:

District	Total	Appointed by Republicans	Appointed by Democrats	Vacant	DJT 2	JRB	DJT 1	BHO 2	BHO 1	GWB 2	GWB 1	WJC 2	WJC 1	GHWB	RWR 2
C.D. of Illinois	4	—	4	—	—	2	—	1	1	—	—	—	—	—	—
N.D. of Illinois	23	8	14	1	—	7	6	5	2	2	—	—	—	—	—
S.D. of Illinois	4	2	2	—	—	—	2	2	—	—	—	—	—	—	—
N.D. of Indiana	5	3	2	—	—	2	2	—	—	—	1	–	—	—	—
S.D. of Indiana	5	3	2	—	1	1	2	—	1	—	—	—	—	—	—
E.D. of Wisconsin	5	2	3	—	—	1	1	1	—	—	—	1	—	—	1
W.D. of Wisconsin	2	—	2	—	—	—	—	1	1	—	—	—	—	—	—
Total	48	18	29	1	1	13	13	10	5	2	1	1	—	—	1

=== District courts in the Eighth Circuit ===
As of July 23, 2026:

District	Total	Appointed by Republicans	Appointed by Democrats	Vacant	DJT 2	JRB	DJT 1	BHO 2	BHO 1	GWB 2	GWB 1
E.D. of Arkansas	5	2	3	—	—	—	1	1	2	1	—
W.D. of Arkansas	3	2	1	—	2	—	—	1	—	—	—
N.D. of Iowa	2	1	1	—	—	—	1	1	—	—	—
S.D. of Iowa	3	—	3	—	—	1	—	1	1	—	—
D. Minnesota	7	2	4	1	—	4	2	—	—	—	—
E.D. of Missouri	9	8	1	—	4	—	3	—	1	—	1
W.D. of Missouri	7	3	4	—	2	—	—	2	2	1	—
D. of Nebraska	3	1	2	—	—	1	1	1	—	—	—
D. of North Dakota	2	1	—	1	—	—	1	—	—	—	—
D. of South Dakota	3	—	3	—	—	2	—	—	1	—	—
Total	44	20	22	2	8	8	9	7	7	2	1

Note: Judge Brian Wimes (Obama appointee) and Judge Joshua Divine (Trump appointee) currently serve in both the Eastern & Western Districts of Missouri.

=== District courts in the Ninth Circuit ===
As of September 19, 2026:

District	Total	Appointed by Republicans	Appointed by Democrats	Vacant	DJT 2	JRB	DJT 1	BHO 2	BHO 1	GWB 2	GWB 1	WJC 2	WJC 1	GHWB	RWR 2
D. of Alaska	3	1	1	1	1	—	—	—	1	—	—	—	—	—	—
D. of Arizona	13	5	8	—	—	3	5	4	1	—	—	—	—	—	—
C.D. of California	28	9	18	1	—	12	4	1	4	1	3	1	—	—	1
E.D. of California	6	—	6	—	—	4	—	2	—	—	—	—	—	—	—
N.D. of California	14	—	14	—	—	7	—	5	2	—	—	—	—	—	—
S.D. of California	13	3	9	1	—	7	1	1	1	1	1	—	—	—	—
D. of Hawaii	4	1	3	—	—	2	1	1	—	—	—	—	—	—	—
D. of Idaho	2	1	1	—	—	1	1	—	—	—	—	—	—	—	—
D. of Montana	3	2	1	—	2	—	—	1	—	—	—	—	—	—	—
D. of Nevada	7	—	7	—	—	2	—	3	2	—	—	—	—	—	—
D. of Oregon	6	1	5	—	—	3	1	1	1	—	—	—	—	—	—
E.D. of Washington	4	—	4	—	—	2	—	1	1	—	—	—	—	—	—
W.D. of Washington	7	—	7	—	—	7	—	—	—	—	—	—	—	—	—
Total	110	23	84	3	3	50	13	20	13	2	4	1	—	—	1

=== District courts in the Tenth Circuit ===
As of November 16, 2026:

District	Total	Appointed by Republicans	Appointed by Democrats	Vacant	DJT 2	JRB	DJT 1	BHO 2	BHO 1	GWB 2	GWB 1	WJC 2	WJC 1	GHWB	RWR 2
D. of Colorado	7	1	5	1	—	5	—	—	—	1	—	—	—	—	—
D. of Kansas	6	6	—	—	3	—	3	—	—	—	—	—	—	—	—
D. of New Mexico	7	1	5	1	—	4	1	1	—	—	—	—	—	—	—
E.D. of Oklahoma	2	1	—	1	—	—	1	—	—	—	—	—	—	—	—
N.D. of Oklahoma	4	1	2	1	—	2	1	—	—	—	—	—	—	—	—
W.D. of Oklahoma	7	7	—	—	—	—	6	—	—	1	—	—	—	—	—
D. of Utah	5	2	3	—	—	1	2	1	1	—	—	—	—	—	—
D. of Wyoming	3	1	2	—	—	1	—	—	1	—	—	—	—	—	1
Total	41	20	17	4	3	13	14	2	2	2	—	—	—	—	1

Note: Judge John Heil III (Trump appointee) currently serves on the Eastern, Northern, & Western Districts of Oklahoma

=== District courts in the Eleventh Circuit ===
As of November 12, 2026:

District	Total	Appointed by Republicans	Appointed by Democrats	Vacant	DJT 2	JRB	DJT 1	BHO 2	BHO 1	GWB 2	GWB 1	WJC 2	WJC 1	GHWB
M.D. of Alabama	3	3	—	—	1	—	2	—	—	—	—	—	—	—
N.D. of Alabama	8	7	1	—	3	—	4	1	—	—	—	—	—	—
S.D. of Alabama	3	3	—	—	—	—	2	—	—	1	—	—	—	—
M.D. of Florida	15	10	4	1	3	1	5	3	—	2	—	—	—	—
N.D. of Florida	4	3	1	—	—	—	2	—	1	—	1	—	—	—
S.D. of Florida	19	10	9	-	2	3	5	3	1	—	2	2	—	1
M.D. of Georgia	4	2	2	—	—	—	1	1	1	—	1	—	—	—
N.D. of Georgia	11	4	6	1	—	3	4	3	—	—	—	—	—	—
S.D. of Georgia	3	3	—	—	—	—	1	—	—	2	—	—	—	—
Total	70	45	23	2	9	7	26	11	3	5	4	2	—	1

=== District court in the D.C. Circuit ===
As of December 3, 2024:

District	Total	Appointed by Republicans	Appointed by Democrats	Vacant	DJT 2	JRB	DJT 1	BHO 2	BHO 1
D. of Columbia	15	4	11	—	—	5	4	4	2
Total	15	4	11	—	—	5	4	4	2

== United States Court of International Trade ==
The United States Court of International Trade is an Article III court, with full powers in law and equity, established by the Customs Court Act of 1980 to replace the United States Customs Court.

As of August 10, 2026:

Year	Total	Appointed by Republicans	Appointed by Democrats	Vacant	DJT 2	JRB	DJT 1	BHO 2	BHO 1	GWB 2	GWB 1
Current	9	3	6	—	1	2	2	4	—	—	—
2025	9	3	6	—	—	2	3	4	—	—	—
2021	9	4	4	1	—	—	3	4	—	—	1

== See also ==
- United States federal judge
- List of current United States circuit judges
- List of current United States district judges
- List of presidents of the United States by judicial appointments
