= Elias Glenn =

American judge

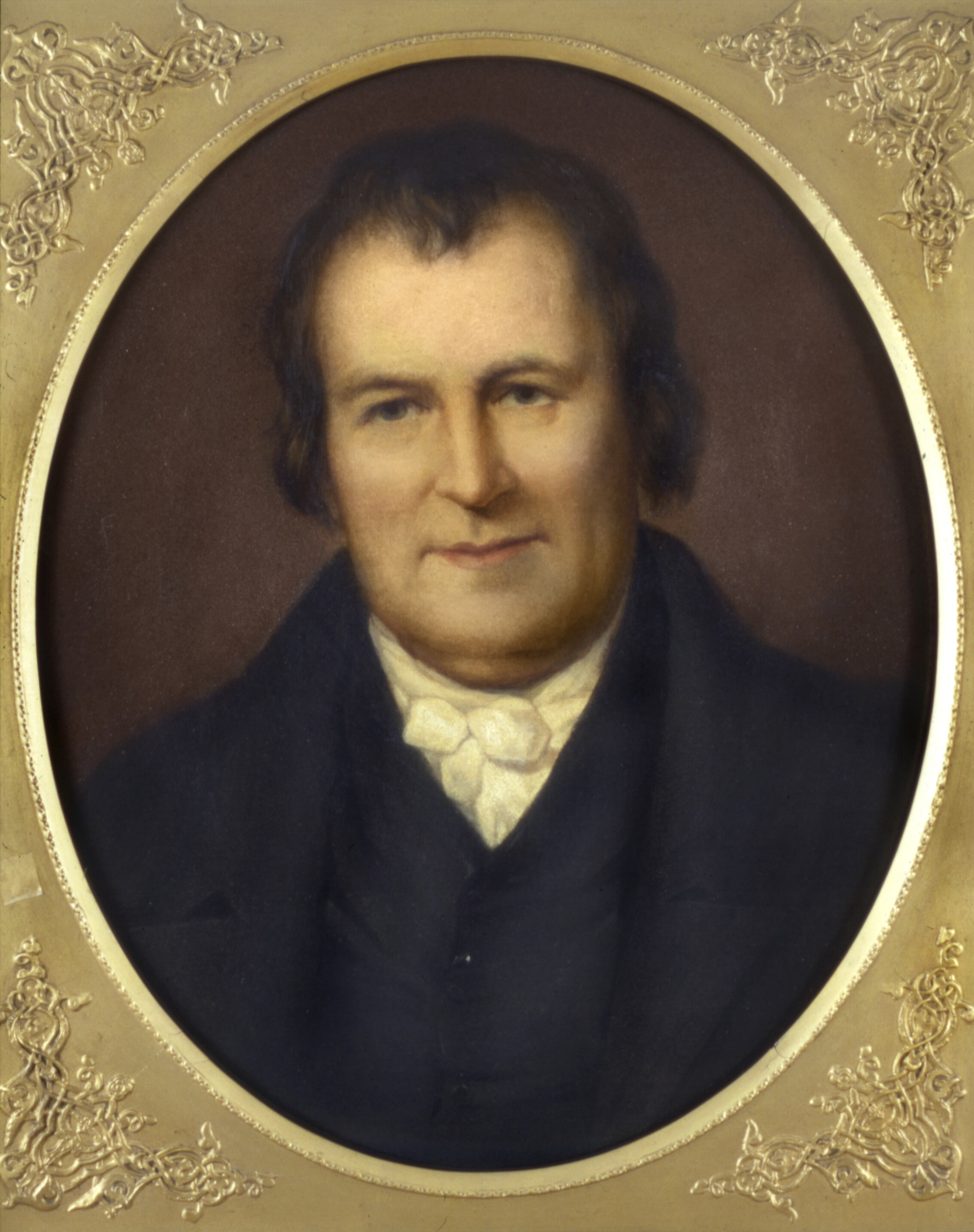
- Portrait, c. 1800–1804

Judge of the United States District Court for the District of Maryland
- In office August 31, 1824 – April 1, 1836

United States Attorney for the District of Maryland
- In office 1812–1831
- Appointed by: James Madison
- Preceded by: Thomas Beale Dorsey
- Succeeded by: Nathaniel Williams

Personal details
- Born: Elias Glenn; August 26, 1769 Elkton, Province of Maryland, British America
- Died: January 6, 1846 (aged 76) Baltimore, Maryland
- Children: William Wilkins Glenn

Elias Glenn (August 26, 1769 – January 6, 1846) was a United States district judge of the United States District Court for the District of Maryland.

== Education and career ==
Born on August 26, 1769, in Elkton, Province of Maryland, British America, Glenn entered private practice in Baltimore, Maryland. He was a Judge for the Baltimore County Court. He was United States Attorney for the District of Maryland from 1812 to 1824.

== Federal judicial service ==
Glenn received a recess appointment from President James Monroe on August 31, 1824, to a seat on the United States District Court for the District of Maryland vacated by Judge Theodorick Bland. He was nominated to the same position by President Monroe on December 16, 1824. He was confirmed by the United States Senate on January 3, 1825, and received his commission the same day. His service terminated on April 1, 1836, due to his resignation.

== Later career and death ==
Following his resignation from the federal bench, Glenn resumed private practice in Baltimore from 1836 to 1846. He died on January 6, 1846, in Baltimore.

== Family ==
Glenn's son, William Wilkins Glenn, was a journalist and newspaper proprietor who was jailed for his Confederate sympathies.

== Sources ==
Legal offices
Preceded by Theodorick Bland	Judge of the United States District Court for the District of Maryland; 1824–1836	Succeeded by Upton Scott Heath
