= William F. Giles =

American judge

William Fell Giles
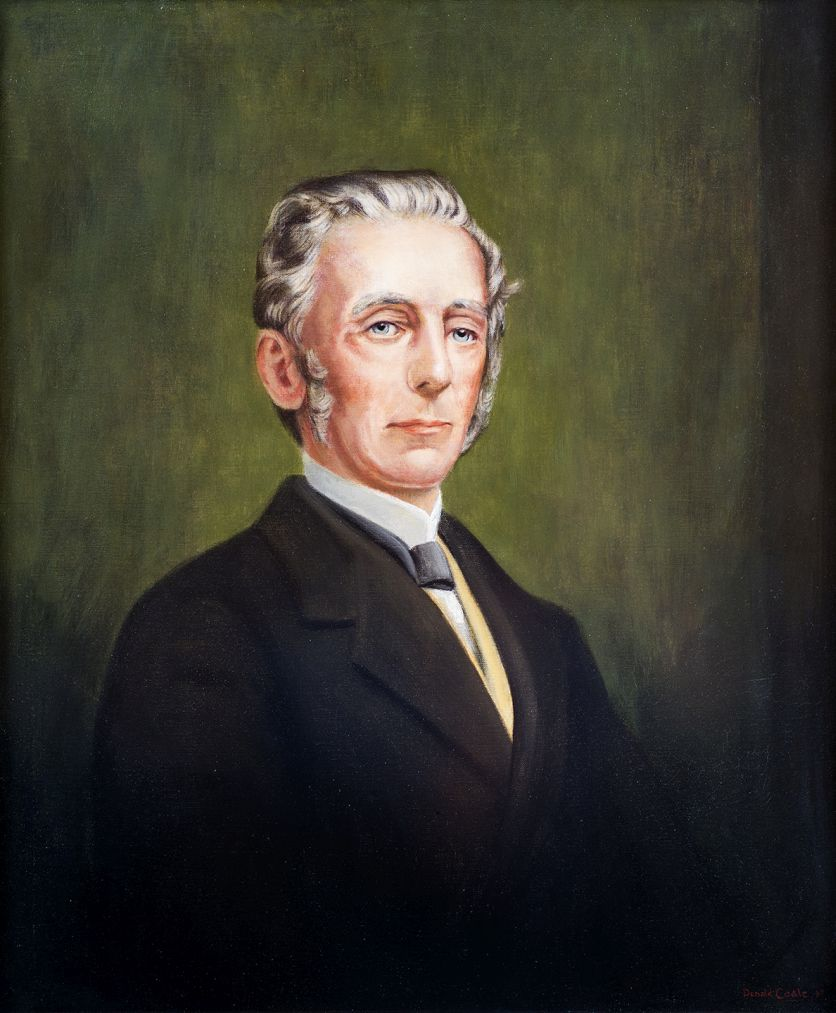

Judge of the United States District Court for the District of Maryland
- In office July 18, 1853 – March 21, 1879
- Appointed by: Franklin Pierce
- Preceded by: John Glenn
- Succeeded by: Thomas John Morris

Member of the U.S. House of Representatives from Maryland's 4th district
- In office March 4, 1845 – March 3, 1847
- Preceded by: John P. Kennedy
- Succeeded by: Robert Milligan McLane

Personal details
- Born: William Fell Giles; April 8, 1807 Harford County, Maryland
- Died: March 21, 1879 (aged 71) Baltimore, Maryland
- Resting place: Green Mount Cemetery; Baltimore, Maryland
- Party: Democratic
- Education: read law

William Fell Giles (April 8, 1807 – March 21, 1879) was a United States representative from Maryland and later a United States district judge of the United States District Court for the District of Maryland.

== Education and career ==
Born on April 8, 1807, in Harford County, Maryland, Giles attended a private academy and the Bel Air Academy, then read law in 1829. Giles was admitted to the bar and entered private practice in Baltimore, Maryland from 1829 to 1837, in 1839, from 1841 to 1844, and from 1847 to 1853. He was a member of the Maryland House of Delegates in 1838 and 1840.

=== Other service ===
Giles was an officer of the American Colonization Society for more than thirty years, and for more than twenty years one of the commissioners of the State of Maryland supervising the emigration of free blacks to Liberia.

== Congressional service ==
Giles was elected as a Democrat from Maryland's 4th congressional district to the United States House of Representatives of the 29th United States Congress, serving from March 4, 1845, to March 3, 1847. He declined to be a candidate for renomination.

== Federal judicial service ==
Giles received a recess appointment from President Franklin Pierce on July 18, 1853, to a seat on the United States District Court for the District of Maryland vacated by Judge John Glenn. He was nominated to the same position by President Pierce on December 19, 1853. He was confirmed by the United States Senate on January 11, 1854, and received his commission the same day. His service terminated on March 21, 1879, due to his death in Baltimore. He was interred in Green Mount Cemetery in Baltimore.

=== Notable case ===
Giles issued the original writ of habeas corpus in Ex parte Merryman.

== See also ==
- Ex parte Merryman

== Sources ==
- United States Congress. "William F. Giles (id: G000184)". Biographical Directory of the United States Congress.

U.S. House of Representatives
| Preceded by John P. Kennedy | Member of the U.S. House of Representatives from Maryland's 4th congressional district 1845–1847 | Succeeded by Robert Milligan McLane |
Legal offices
| Preceded by John Glenn | Judge of the United States District Court for the District of Maryland; 1853–1879 | Succeeded by Thomas John Morris |
