= Upton Scott Heath =

American judge

Judge of the United States District Court for the District of Maryland
- In office April 4, 1836 – February 21, 1852
- Appointed by: Andrew Jackson
- Preceded by: Elias Glenn
- Succeeded by: John Glenn

Personal details
- Born: Upton Scott Heath; October 10, 1784 Maryland
- Died: February 21, 1852 (aged 67) Baltimore, Maryland

Upton Scott Heath (October 10, 1784 – February 21, 1852) was a United States district judge of the United States District Court for the District of Maryland.

== Education and career ==
Born on October 10, 1784, in Maryland, Heath was in private practice in Maryland until 1835. He was a city councilman for Baltimore, Maryland from 1825 to 1826.

== Federal judicial service ==
Heath was nominated by President Andrew Jackson on April 1, 1836, to a seat on the United States District Court for the District of Maryland vacated by Judge Elias Glenn. He was confirmed by the United States Senate on April 4, 1836, and received his commission the same day. His service terminated on February 21, 1852, due to his death in Baltimore.

== Sources ==
- Helen W. Ridgeley, "The Ancient Churchyards of Baltimore", in The Grafton Magazine of History and Genealogy (1910), Volume 2, p. 111.

Legal offices
Preceded by Elias Glenn	Judge of the United States District Court for the District of Maryland; 1836–1852	Succeeded by John Glenn
