= Lioness (steamship) =

Exploded Red River of the South, 1833

History

United States
- Name: Lioness
- Operator: William L. Cockerell

The Lioness was a steamboat that exploded on the Red River of the South on the morning of May 19, 1833.

Departing from New Orleans, the ship made its way up the Mississippi River before reaching the Red River, destined for Natchitoches, Louisiana. As it neared the mouth of a tributary called Rigolet de Bon Dieu (near modern-day Colfax), three explosions rocked the ship, tearing apart the fore deck and boiler deck and scattering debris across the surrounding waters and coast. The hull almost immediately sunk; however, the hurricane deck and a portion of the lady's cabin became detached from the rest of the ship, staying afloat and saving everyone in those quarters. All of those who survived saved themselves by swimming or floating to shore on fragments of the wreck.

There were reportedly 60 kegs of gunpowder aboard. A lit candle below decks may have triggered the blasts. This would explain why there were three explosions, each occurring when another keg detonated. Crates of dry straw and casks of oil stowed dangerously close to the gunpowder kegs also accelerated the fire. There is not, however, an official explanation on how the powder was ignited, as everyone in the hold was killed.

At least 16 people were killed in the disaster, including United States Senator Josiah S. Johnston. Among the survivors were Congressman and future Louisiana Governor Edward Douglass White, Sr., who suffered some burns and bruises, and District Judge Henry Boyce.

There was a later lawsuit about whether a gunpowder cargo mooted the ship's maritime insurance policy.

The Prince Maximilian of Wied-Neuwied–Karl Bodmer expedition saw Lionness in February 1833 and called it a cottonboat.
