= List of federal judges appointed by Zachary Taylor =

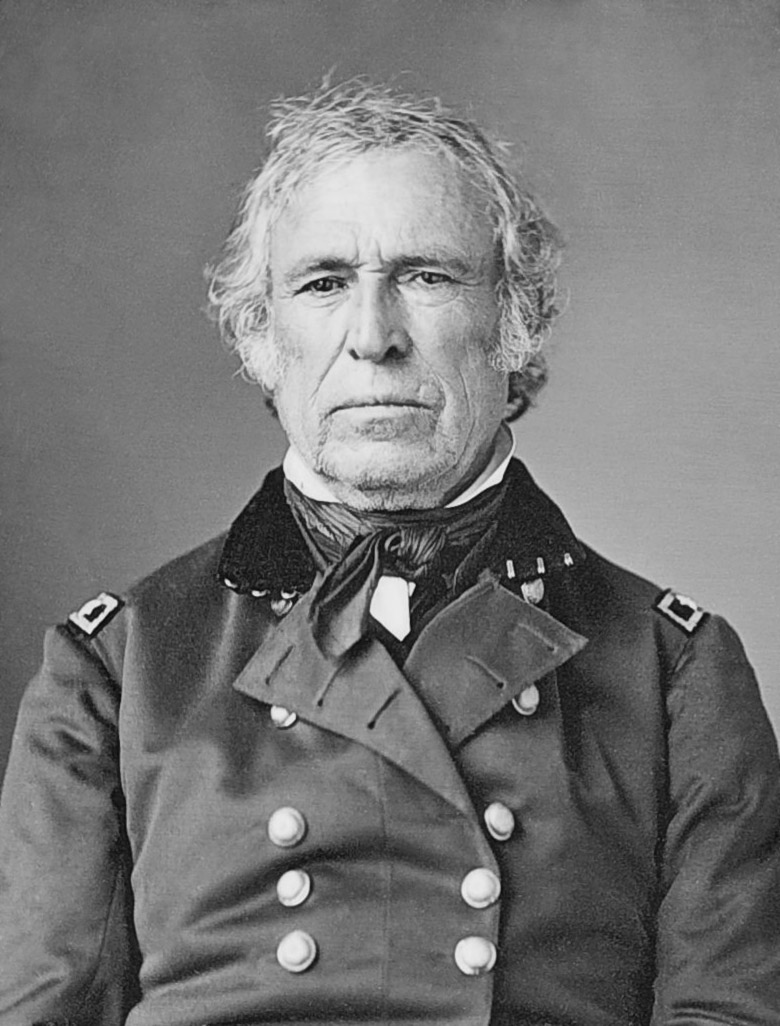
Zachary Taylor

Following is a list of all Article III United States federal judges appointed by President Zachary Taylor during his presidency. In total Taylor appointed 4 Article III federal judges, all to the United States district courts.

Taylor shared the appointment of Henry Boyce with Millard Fillmore. Taylor recess appointed Boyce and later nominated him. However, the United States Senate did not confirm Boyce until after Taylor's death and Boyce received his commission from Fillmore.

== District Courts ==
#	Judge	Court (Note: See List of United States district and territorial courts)	Nomination date	Confirmation date	Began active service	Ended active service
1	John Gayle	M.D. Ala. N.D. Ala. S.D. Ala.	March 12, 1849	March 13, 1849	March 13, 1849	July 21, 1859
2	Henry Boyce	W.D. La.	December 21, 1849	August 2, 1850	May 9, 1849	February 19, 1861
3	Daniel Ringo	D. Ark.	December 21, 1849	June 10, 1850	November 5, 1849	May 6, 1861
4	Thomas Drummond	D. Ill.	January 31, 1850	February 19, 1850	February 19, 1850	December 22, 1869

== Sources ==
- Federal Judicial Center
