= Baltimore Gazette (1862–1875) =

Daily newspaper in Baltimore, Maryland

- Type: Daily newspaper
- Owner(s): William Wilkins Glenn, Frank Key Howard, and William H. Carpenter (formerly)
- Founder(s): Edward F. Carter and William H. Neilson (formerly)
- Founded: October 7, 1862
- Ceased publication: December 31, 1875
- City: Baltimore, Maryland
- Country: United States

The Baltimore Gazette, also known as the Baltimore Daily Gazette or simply The Gazette, was a daily newspaper in Baltimore, Maryland, published between 1862 and 1875. The paper was associated with several high-profile figures in publishing and politics, including William Hinson Cole and William Wilkins Glenn.

== See also ==
- George Bourne
