= List of federal judges appointed by Millard Fillmore =

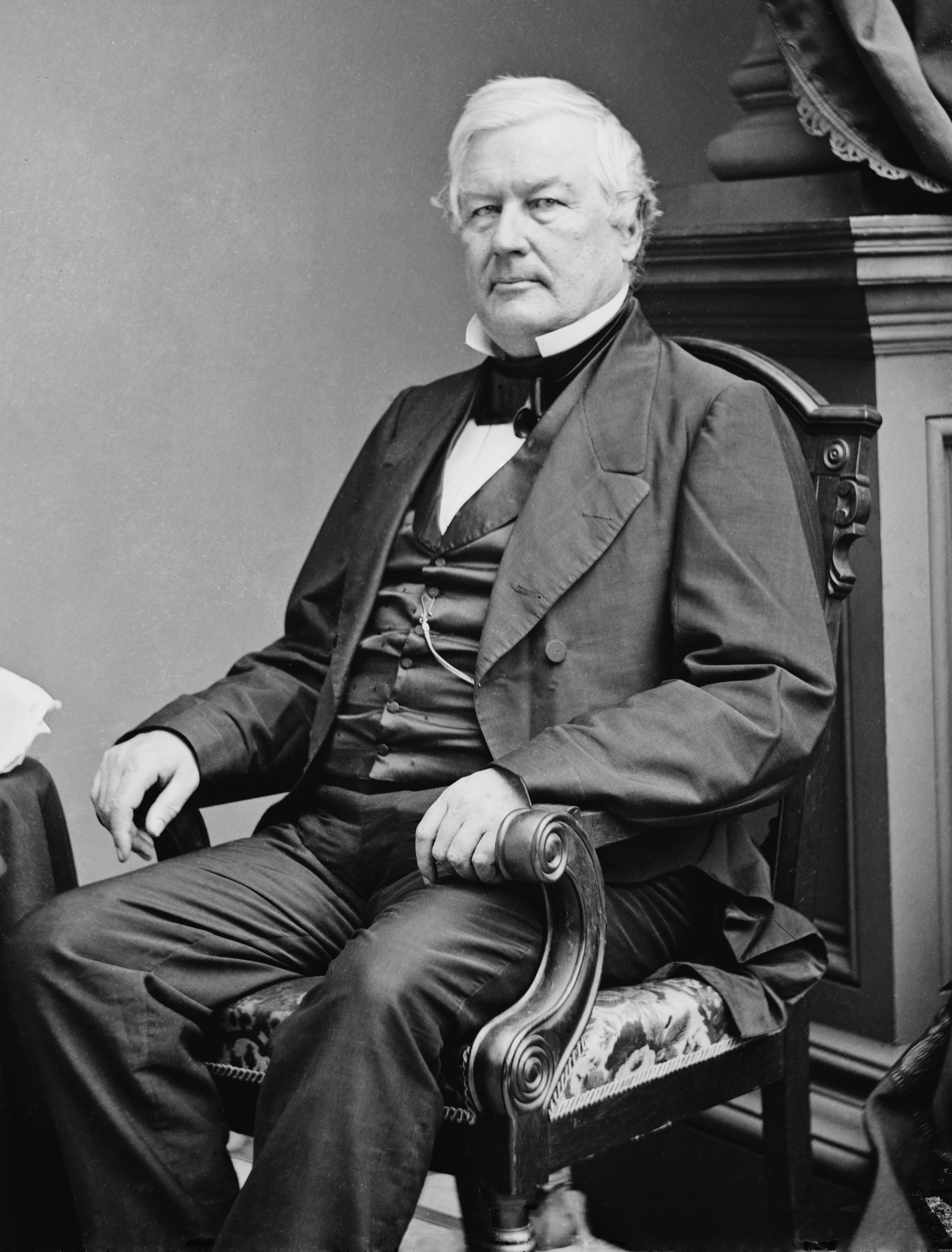
Millard Fillmore

Following is a list of all Article III United States federal judges appointed by President Millard Fillmore during his presidency. In total Fillmore appointed 6 Article III federal judges, including 1 Justice to the Supreme Court of the United States and 5 judges to the United States district courts.

Associate Justice John McKinley's death in July, 1852, led to repeated, fruitless attempts by the president to fill the vacancy. The three unsuccessful nominees included Edward A. Bradford, nominated August 16, 1852, George Edmund Badger, nominated January 3, 1853 and William C. Micou, nominated February 14, 1853. The United States Senate took no action on any of the nominees.

Fillmore shared the appointment of Henry Boyce with Zachary Taylor. Taylor recess appointed Boyce and later nominated him. However, the United States Senate did not confirm Boyce until after Taylor's death and Boyce received his commission from Fillmore.

== United States Supreme Court justices ==
#	Justice	Seat	State	Former justice	Nomination date	Confirmation date	Began active service	Ended active service
1	Benjamin Robbins Curtis	2	Massachusetts	Levi Woodbury	December 11, 1851	December 20, 1851	September 22, 1851	September 30, 1857

== District courts ==
#	Judge	Court (Note: See List of United States district and territorial courts)	Nomination date	Confirmation date	Began active service	Ended active service
1	Henry Boyce	W.D. La.	December 21, 1849	August 2, 1850	May 9, 1849	February 19, 1861
2	James McHall Jones	S.D. Cal.	December 23, 1850	December 26, 1850	December 26, 1850	December 15, 1851
3	Ogden Hoffman Jr.	N.D. Cal.	February 1, 1851	February 27, 1851	February 27, 1851	August 9, 1891
4	John Glenn	D. Md.	March 18, 1852	March 19, 1852	March 19, 1852	July 8, 1853
5	Nathan K. Hall	N.D.N.Y.	August 13, 1852	August 31, 1852	August 31, 1852	March 2, 1874

== Sources ==
- Federal Judicial Center
