= John Glenn (judge) =

American judge (1795–1853)

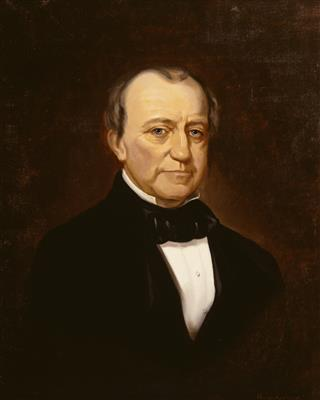

Judge of the United States District Court for the District of Maryland
- In office March 19, 1852 – July 8, 1853
- Appointed by: Millard Fillmore
- Preceded by: Upton Scott Heath
- Succeeded by: William Fell Giles

Personal details
- Born: John Glenn; October 9, 1795 Elkton, Maryland
- Died: July 8, 1853 (aged 57) Catonsville, Maryland
- Education: read law

John Glenn (October 9, 1795 – July 8, 1853) was a United States district judge of the United States District Court for the District of Maryland.

== Education and career ==
Born on October 9, 1795, in Elkton, Maryland, Glenn read law in 1817. He was in private practice in Baltimore, Maryland until 1852, with the exception of a period of service as United States Attorney for the District of Maryland.

== Federal judicial service ==
Glenn was nominated by President Millard Fillmore on March 18, 1852, to a seat on the United States District Court for the District of Maryland vacated by Judge Upton Scott Heath. He was confirmed by the United States Senate on March 19, 1852, and received his commission the same day. His service terminated on July 8, 1853, due to his death near Catonsville, Maryland.

== Estate ==
Glenn purchased and expanded his brother's estate Hilton near Catonsville in 1842. He entertained Robert E. Lee as a guest several times and lived there until his death. The estate is currently part of the Community College of Baltimore County, with the majority of the original property subdivided for housing developments.

== Sources ==
Legal offices
Preceded by Upton Scott Heath	Judge of the United States District Court for the District of Maryland; 1852–1853	Succeeded by William Fell Giles
