= Old Smokey =

Nickname for a state prison electric chair

Old Smokey is a euphemistic name given to the state prison electric chair in New Jersey, Pennsylvania and Tennessee. The term has sometimes been used to refer to electric chairs in general, and not the one used in any specific state.

== New Jersey ==
New Jersey's Old Smokey is on display at the New Jersey State Police Museum. The chair's most notorious target was Richard Hauptmann, the man behind the Lindbergh kidnapping.

The chair at the New Jersey State Prison in Trenton was used in the electrocution of 159 men for capital punishment in New Jersey, starting with Saverio DiGiovanni on December 11, 1907, and ending with Ralph Hudson on January 22, 1963, which also was the final execution carried out in New Jersey. Hauptmann was executed on April 3, 1936.

After the death penalty was abolished nationwide in 1972 following Furman v. Georgia, the chair was moved to storage and the chamber was converted to a visitor center. In the 1980s, the chair was put on exhibit at the now-defunct Capital Punishment Museum, housed in a building at the New Jersey State Corrections Academy; after its curator died in 1995, the chair was sent to the New Jersey State Museum and later was transferred to the New Jersey State Police Museum in Ewing Township, where it remains on display. New Jersey abandoned electrocution in favor of lethal injection in 1983, then abolished capital punishment altogether in 2007.

== Pennsylvania ==
The Pennsylvania electric chair was used in the electrocution of 348 men and two women for capital punishment in Pennsylvania at what is now SCI Rockview, starting with the execution of John Talap on February 15, 1915, and ending with the execution of Elmo Lee Smith on April 2, 1962.

The chair was placed into storage in 1971 and reassembled in 1985, but never was used again after Pennsylvania abolished electrocution in 1990 as an execution method, in favor of lethal injection. It is stored at the State Museum of Pennsylvania, and has never been displayed.

== Tennessee ==
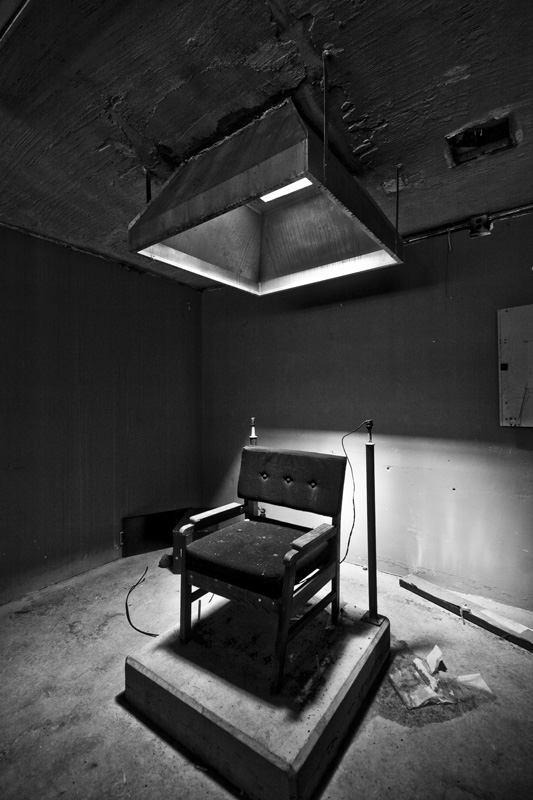
Electric chair chamber at Tennessee State Prison (2007), after the chair was removed

The electric chair at the Tennessee State Prison in Nashville also was nicknamed "Old Smokey", and was used to execute 125 people for capital punishment in Tennessee between July 13, 1916 (Julius Morgan) and November 7, 1960 (William Tines).

After switching its primary method of execution to lethal injection in 2000, Tennessee has given prisoners sentenced to capital punishment before then a choice between lethal injection or electrocution; the chair was moved to Riverbend Maximum Security Institution and refurbished by Fred A. Leuchter. In 2014, Tennessee Governor Bill Haslam signed a bill making the electric chair a backup method of execution if the drugs used in lethal injection are not available.

After the original chair was removed, it was put on display at the National Museum of Crime and Punishment in Washington D.C., where it was until it and everything else there got moved to Pigeon Forge, Tennessee for the Alcatraz East Crime Museum, where it resides today.

Since the chair was refurbished, Tennessee has executed six prisoners by electrocution:

- Daryl Holton (September 12, 2007)
- Edmund Zagorski (November 1, 2018)
- David Earl Miller (December 6, 2018)
- Stephen Michael West (August 15, 2019)
- Lee Hall (December 5, 2019)
- Nicholas Todd Sutton (February 20, 2020)

== See also ==
- Old Sparky, the nickname given to several states' electric chairs
- Gruesome Gertie, the nickname given to Louisiana's electric chair
- Yellow Mama, the nickname given to Alabama's electric chair
- List of people executed by electrocution
