= Murders of Wanda and Sheila Romines =

1986 double murder of a mother-daughter pair in East Tennessee, United States

- Location: Union County, Tennessee, United States
- Date: March 17, 1986
- Attack type: Murder, kidnapping and rape
- Verdict: Guilty
- Convictions: Stephen West; First-degree murder (x2); Aggravated kidnapping (x2); Aggravated rape Ronnie Martin; First-degree murder (x2)
- Sentence: Stephen West; Death – murder 120 years' imprisonment – Other charges Ronnie Martin; 2 consecutive life sentences (eligible for parole in 2027) – murder
- Convicted: Stephen Michael West, 23; Ronnie Martin, 17

On March 17, 1986, a mother-daughter pair, 51-year-old Wanda Lou Romines (April 10, 1934 – March 17, 1986) and 15-year-old Sheila Ann Romines (November 26, 1970 – March 17, 1986), were held hostage in their home by two men in Union County, Tennessee, United States. The Romines were subsequently murdered by their kidnappers, who both tortured the victims to death and even raped Sheila Romines. The murderers – Stephen Michael West (September 16, 1962 – August 15, 2019) and Ronald David "Ronnie" Martin (born 1969) – were arrested the following day and charged with the double murder.

West, who was 23 years old when he killed the women, was convicted and condemned to death in 1987, while Martin, who was 17 at the time of the offence, was spared the death penalty and instead sentenced to life imprisonment after pleading guilty. West was incarcerated on death row for 32 years before he was executed by the electric chair on August 15, 2019. Martin remains incarcerated in a Tennessee prison and will be eligible for parole in 2027.

== Double murder ==
=== Murder of the Romines ===
On March 17, 1986, in Union County, Tennessee, a mother-daughter pair were kidnapped and murdered by two men.

On that day, 51-year-old Wanda Lou Romines and her 15-year-old daughter Sheila Ann Romines were present at home when they were both confronted and held hostage by two male intruders. Before the hold-up, the two offenders – Sheila's 17-year-old schoolmate Ronald David Martin (alias Ronnie Martin) and his 23-year-old colleague Stephen Michael West (who previously served in the US Army for three years) – had just completed their work shift at McDonald's and went out for a drinking session when Martin reportedly told West he knew a girl who would have sex with them. Martin had his targets settled on Sheila since he knew her from her school days at Anderson County High School, and in turn, knew Sheila's mother Wanda as well; Martin had in the past confessed his attraction to Sheila but she rejected him. On the other hand, West did not know the Romines or any one related to them.

After they entered the house of the Romines under the pretense of borrowing money, both Martin and West brutally tortured the victims and stabbed both Wanda and Sheila Romines to death before leaving the premises. Additionally, Sheila was raped by the killers before she died. The bodies of the Romines were subsequently discovered by Jack Romines, who was the husband of Wanda and father of Sheila, when he returned from work.

A day later, on March 18, 1986, after police investigations linked both Martin and West to the case, the duo were arrested for the murders, and subsequently charged in court with kidnapping, rape and murder. Under Tennessee state law, for the most serious charge of murder, both men could face the death penalty.

=== Forensic reports ===
Dr. Cleland Blake, a forensic pathologist, determined that Sheila Romines was stabbed 17 times in the abdomen, including 14 torture-like cuts. Sheila also suffered three fatal stab wounds to the heart, each over five inches deep. Dr. Blake concluded that these fatal wounds were inflicted by knives of at least that length. Dr. Blake also determined that based on blood drainage patterns, Sheila's torture wounds were inflicted before the fatal heart wounds, and some of the abdominal wounds penetrated vital organs like the liver and mesentery, which led to significant internal bleeding. Dr. Blake explained that this internal bleeding would not have occurred if the heart had already stopped pumping, which it would have done within a minute of the fatal heart wounds. Sheila also had two defensive wounds on her left arm and thumb. Dr. Blake concluded that Sheila experienced severe pain and suffering from the multiple stab wounds, especially those affecting the liver.

As for Wanda Romines, Dr. Blake certified that Wanda suffered multiple deep stab wounds. One wound collapsed Wanda's right lung, while others damaged her colon, liver, gallbladder, and other organs. A fatal wound severed her right common iliac artery, leading to massive internal bleeding and death within 5–10 minutes. Like her daughter, Wanda also had torture-like wounds.

Dr. Blake examined the crime scene, the bodies, and performed autopsies on both victims. Based on the wound patterns, he concluded that two different knives were used and that some wounds were inflicted while Sheila was on her bed, while others were inflicted on the floor beside the bed. Dr. Blake also confirmed that two people were involved in the attack, both inflicting wounds and separating the victims until they were ultimately killed by the severe stab wounds.

== Trials of the murderers ==
Both Ronnie Martin and Stephen West were tried in separate courts for the murders of the Romines.

On March 16, 1987, West was the first out of the duo to stand trial before a Union County jury for the double murder. Consequently, West was convicted of two counts of first-degree murder, two counts of aggravated kidnapping and one count of aggravated rape.

On March 25, 1987, West was sentenced to death for the charges of murdering Sheila and Wanda Romines, after all the 12 jurors unanimously agreed to impose the death penalty on the grounds that the murders were especially heinous, atrocious or cruel, and that the murders were committed in the course of a serious offence like rape or kidnapping and additionally to avoid arrest. Apart from the two death sentences, West also received three consecutive sentences of 40 years' jail for the lesser convictions of rape and kidnapping.

As for Ronnie Martin, he was tried in a separate court for the murders of the Romines. Due to the fact that Martin was 17 years old at the time of the murder, he was ineligible for the death penalty in accordance with state law. As a result, Martin pleaded guilty to all counts, and he was sentenced to two consecutive life terms. Martin will be eligible for parole in 2027.

== Appeals of West ==
After he was sentenced to death, Stephen West, who protested his innocence, spent 32 years appealing against his death sentence while on death row.

On February 6, 1989, the Tennessee Supreme Court turned down West's direct appeal against his death sentence. The judges rejected West's claims that he was threatened into helping Ronnie Martin kill the victims, stating that if he truly never wanted to cause the deaths of the Romines, he could have just left without taking part in the stabbings and noted that the forensic pathologist verified that the crime was not the acts of a lone killer but more than one murderer was involved. They also made note with three years of military experience and having a larger physical build than Martin, it was not possible for the older West to give in to any of the younger Martin's threats.

On May 12, 2000, the Tennessee Supreme Court once again rejected West's second appeal.

A year later, West was scheduled to be executed on March 3, 2001, and he had waived his appeals, requesting to die by electrocution instead of lethal injection. Although the electric chair was tested and found to be working, the execution did not go ahead since it was postponed following a federal court appeal.

A second death warrant was issued on November 30, 2010, but a stay of execution was granted on the eve of West's execution to allow him to file an appeal to challenge the constitutionality of the state's execution protocols. This lawsuit was rejected on April 1, 2012.

On June 25, 2015, West's appeal was dismissed by the 6th U.S. Circuit Court of Appeals.

West was one of the plaintiffs involved in a lawsuit, suing the state against its lethal injection protocols on the grounds that it was cruel and unusual punishment by causing excessive pain. On March 29, 2017, the Tennessee Supreme Court rejected the lawsuit, upholding the state's lethal injection protocols.

== West's electric chair execution ==
By late 2018, Stephen West, who had exhausted all avenues of appeal against his death sentence, was listed as one of the several inmates in line for imminent execution between 2018 and 2020.

=== Firing squad lawsuit in 2018 ===
West and three other death row prisoners – Nicholas Todd Sutton, Terry Lynn King and David Earl Miller – filed a lawsuit against the state on November 5, 2018. The four plaintiffs requested to be executed by firing squad instead of lethal injection, which was the state's primary method of execution, and argued that Tennessee's current lethal injection protocols could result in prolonged and torturous deaths, as proven by the state's botched lethal injection execution of Billy Ray Irick during that same year; Irick was found guilty of the rape and murder of a young girl in 1985 and therefore condemned to death.

The U.S. District Court for the Middle District of Tennessee dismissed the motion on November 20, 2018. The 6th Circuit Court of Appeals also rejected the lawsuit and upheld the lower district court's decision on November 28, 2018, and approved the upcoming executions of the four. One of these inmates, Miller, was subsequently put to death on December 6, 2018, by the electric chair. Sutton was similarly executed by the electric chair on February 20, 2020. King, who was condemned in 1985 for the 1983 murder of Diana Kay Smith, presently remains on death row as of 2024.

=== Death warrant, execution method and final appeals ===
On February 3, 2019, NBC News reported that West was one of four condemned inmates from Tennessee who were scheduled to be executed by the state in 2019, with another two (including Nicholas Todd Sutton) planned for 2020. West's death sentence was tentatively slated to be carried out on August 15, 2019. This arrangement was confirmed in July 2019.

Prior to his scheduled execution, West was given the chance to select whichever execution method he preferred to die with. Under Tennessee state law, prisoners sentenced to death before 1999 were allowed to choose between the default method of lethal injection or the alternative method of electrocution via the electric chair. However, by July 31, 2019, West failed to make his choice after the deadline passed, and hence, his execution was slated to be carried out with lethal injection by default.

On August 6, 2019, the 6th U.S. Circuit Court of Appeals rejected West's appeal against the death sentence.

On August 15, 2019, less than three hours before the execution procedure would commence, the U.S. Supreme Court declined to hear West's final appeal and hence, ordered the execution to move forward.

Whilst he was appealing to the courts to stave off his execution, West appealed to the Tennessee governor for clemency, which would allow his death sentence to be commuted to life imprisonment if successful. West stated in his clemency petition that while he indeed raped Sheila Romines and participated in the kidnapping, he never personally stabbed both Sheila and her mother Wanda Romines to death and insisted it was Martin alone who stabbed the victims. It was further revealed in the clemency plea that West was born in an Indiana mental asylum, where his mother was under confinement over a suicide attempt of carbon monoxide inhalation while pregnant with West, and that his abusive upbringing was not presented to the jury, which would have allowed him to be spared the death sentence and his sentence should be lowered on humanitarian grounds. However, Governor Bill Lee announced on August 13, 2019, that he decided to not grant clemency to West. On the same day when the clemency appeal was dismissed, West was transferred to another cell to be placed under death watch, a 72-hour high security surveillance of death row inmates during their final hours before execution.

At the last minute, West expressed that he did not want to die by lethal injection, but preferred to be executed by the electric chair. The change of execution methods was granted after West made the choice.

=== Execution and aftermath ===
On August 15, 2019, 56-year-old Stephen Michael West was put to death by the electric chair at Riverbend Maximum Security Institution. Before he was pronounced dead at 7:27 p.m., West said in his final words:

"In the beginning, God created man. And Jesus wept. That is all."

For his final meal, West requested for a Philly cheesesteak and french fries. West was the fifth inmate to be executed in Tennessee since 2018 after the state resumed executions since its last execution in 2009, and he was additionally the third condemned prisoner in Tennessee who chose to die by electrocution.

In response to the scheduled execution of West, Eddie Campbell, the nephew of Jack Romines, who died in 2008, stated that after his uncle died, he had taken up the responsibility to keep up with the updates of West's case, hoping to help his uncle to witness justice being served for the deaths of his uncle's wife and daughter, and promised to keep their memories alive by telling their stories. Campbell also lamented over the fact that justice took 33 years in this case to finally arrive and supported the impending execution of West. Campbell also said that Sheila was the apple of his uncle's eye since she was the only child of Jack and Wanda, who were both a loving couple. After the death sentence was carried out, Eddie Campbell once again spoke to the media, stating that he believed justice still need to be served even though he chose to forgive both West and Martin.

Friends of Sheila Romines similarly agreed to speak to the media. One of them, Jenny Martin, who was part of the school's basketball team back in 1986, remembered Sheila, who joined the basketball team as a freshman, was a "good player, a good student and had everything going for her", and her death was a great shock and loss for her teammates and classmates back in 1986.

== See also ==
- List of kidnappings (1980–1989)
- Capital punishment in Tennessee
- List of people executed in Tennessee
- List of people executed in the United States in 2019

Executions carried out in Tennessee
Preceded by Donnie Johnson May 16, 2019	Stephen Michael West; August 15, 2019	Succeeded by Leroy Hall Jr. December 5, 2019
Executions carried out in the United States
Preceded by Marion Wilson – Georgia June 20, 2019	Stephen Michael West – Tennessee; August 15, 2019	Succeeded by Larry Swearingen – Texas August 21, 2019
