= Murder of Lee Standifer =

1981 murder of a mentally disabled woman in Tennessee, U.S.

Lee Standifer
- Lee Standifer, pictured in her 1976 high school yearbook
- Born: Lee Standifer; May 22, 1957; West Virginia, U.S.
- Died: May 20, 1981 (aged 23); Knoxville, Tennessee, U.S.
- Cause of death: Fatal injuries caused by stabbing and beating
- Resting place: Edgewood Cemetery
- Education: Farragut High School
- Known for: Murder victim
- Parents: Richard Standifer (father); Helen Standifer (mother)
- Family: Audrey Standifer (younger sister)

On May 20, 1981, in Knoxville, Tennessee, 23-year-old Lee Standifer (May 22, 1957 – May 20, 1981), was murdered by her boyfriend David Earl Miller (July 16, 1957 – December 6, 2018), who dragged her into the woods, beating and stabbing her to death. Standifer's body was found the following day, and Miller was charged with her murder after being arrested in Ohio on May 29, 1981.

Miller was subsequently convicted of the murder and sentenced to death twice; in 1982 and 1987. The first death sentence was overturned in 1984 before being reinstated in 1987. Miller spent about 36 years on death row before he was executed via the electric chair, making him the longest-serving death row inmate in Tennessee history at the time of his execution on December 6, 2018.

== Murder ==
On May 20, 1981, in Knoxville, Tennessee, 23-year-old Lee Standifer, a developmentally disabled woman was murdered while on a date with her killer.

Prior to her murder, Standifer, who was left disabled due to diffused brain damage at the time of her birth, was a graduate of Farragut High School and a food processing plant employee of two years, living at the YWCA in downtown Knoxville. Standifer first met David Earl Miller at the YWCA, and as they grew closer, the two began to date oneanother. On May 20, 1981, Standifer and Miller went to the Trailways Bus Station cafeteria, and later the Knoxville Public Library before they ultimately went to the house of an ordained minister where Miller had lived since 1979.

At the house itself, Miller, for unknown reasons, murdered Standifer by stabbing and beating her extensively. According to Miller, he had consumed drugs before meeting up with Standifer, and while under a state of drug-induced intoxication, hit Standifer while she was clinging on to him to stop him from leaving her side. After beating Standifer several times, Miller finally calmed down and discovered that Standifer was not breathing; he reportedly claimed he never recalled if he had stabbed Standifer. After the murder, Miller disposed of Standifer's body by hanging it on a dogwood tree in the house's backyard, cleaning up the house to remove bloodstains.

Later on, home owner Rev. Benjamin Calvin Thomas, returned home and saw Miller and some of the bloodstains in his house, and probed him on what had happened. After Miller explained he cleaned the house and lied that the bloodstains came from a nosebleed due to a fight, Thomas asked him to move out and Miller, who agreed to do so, was given a ride the next day by Thomas. Miller subsequently left Thomas's vehicle and fled Tennessee by hitchhiking. Thomas, upon his return to his home after giving Miller a ride, discovered the body of Standifer in his backyard. At the same time, Standifer's mother reported her daughter missing after Standifer did not call home or turn up for work the day after her murder.

A police report was immediately lodged by Thomas and the police classified the death of Standifer as a murder. A forensic pathologist found that Standifer sustained two severe head wounds: one on the right side of her forehead and another above her left eye, each about three inches long and half an inch wide. These injuries led to a skull fracture and a subarachnoid hematoma. There were several stab wounds: one of them had completely penetrated her neck and shattered her jawbone; another five were located on her chest, with a sixth on her stomach. A seventh was inflicted on the floor of her mouth. One of the stab wounds was measured eight to nine inches deep and penetrated her heart and aorta. Another wound also went through both her rib cage and fifth rib, while a third passed through the center of her chest. There were two more stab wounds on her back; one penetrated a rib, while the other struck her left shoulder blade without going deeper than an inch.

According to the pathologist, it was likely that a poker was used to inflict the head injuries, while a bowie knife was the most likely murder weapon to cause a majority of the stab wounds, with a huge amount of force exerted to cause said wounds. Multiple bruises were also found on her upper thighs, some of the knife wounds were post-mortem injuries, and her body showed signs of being dragged from the house to the tree. The pathologist also discovered traces of spermatozoa in the victim's vagina, suggesting that Miller had possibly raped Standifer before she died.

Nine days after the murder, on May 29, 1981, Miller was arrested in Columbus, Ohio while attempting to pay a bar tab with a counterfeit $10 bill. He later confessed to Ohio authorities, stating that the beating occurred while he was under the influence of drugs. Subsequently, he was handed over to Tennessee state police.

== Trial of David Earl Miller ==
=== Background ===
David Earl Miller
- Born: July 16, 1957; Toledo, Ohio, U.S.
- Died: December 6, 2018 (aged 61); Riverbend Maximum Security Institution, Nashville, Tennessee, U.S.
- Cause of death: Execution by electrocution
- Conviction: First degree murder
- Penalty: Death

Details
- Victims: Lee Standifer, 23
- Date: May 20, 1981
- Location: Knoxville, Tennessee
- Imprisoned at: Riverbend Maximum Security Institution

David Earl Miller was born on July 16, 1957, in Toledo, Ohio. He was the result of a one night stand, never knowing his father. Miller's mother consumed alcohol during her pregnancy, and she suffered from brain damage in her later life due to exposure to toxic fumes from her work at a plastics plant. Miller's mother remarried when her son was ten months old, but Miller's stepfather was a physically violent alcoholic. Miller experienced several instances of abuse, including regular beatings with boards, being slammed into walls and being dragged around the house by the hair.

According to Miller, he was sexually abused by a female cousin when he was five, and on two other occasions – once by a friend of his grandfather's at age 12, and another by his drunken mother at age 15, but the account of these alleged sexual assaults were disputed by his family. At the age of six, Miller attempted suicide, and by the age of ten, he picked up negative habits like drinking, smoking marijuana and huffing gasoline daily. At 13, he was sent to a state reform school, where he and the other boys often faced regular whippings by the school counselors, who covered up acts of sexual molestation within the school.

In 1974, when Miller turned 17, he joined the Marine Corps and went to boot camp. However, Miller deserted after he received word that he would not be dispatched to Vietnam to fight in the Vietnam War. Miller returned to Ohio and began a relationship with a woman, but the couple broke up while the woman was still pregnant with Miller's daughter, who was subsequently raised by her mother and another man she married.

After this, Miller would often move between Texas and Ohio, working odd jobs as a welder and bartender. He eventually became a drifter and was hitchhiking through east Tennessee when he encountered Rev. Benjamin Calvin Thomas, an ordained minister who invited Miller to live with him. Thus, Miller settled in Tennessee. Prior to Standifer’s murder, Miller was twice arrested for separate rape cases, but no charges were filed against him by his fearful victims and Miller was let off each time after apprehension.

=== Murder charge and trial proceedings ===
After his arrest in 1981, Miller was charged with first-degree murder for the death of Standifer. The offence itself carries the death penalty under Tennessee state law.

Miller was indicted by a Knox County jury on a single murder charge on August 3, 1981. On October 19, a competency hearing was scheduled to determine if he was fit to stand trial; he was subsequently examined by Dr. George Gee, a psychiatrist at the Helen Ross McNabb Mental Health Center. It was concluded in November that Miller was fit to be tried, and although the defence sought a second medical opinion to dispute Dr. Gee's findings, this request was denied.

Miller was formally put on trial in March 1982. The defence sought to argue that Miller was insane and was suffering from diminished responsibility at the time of the murder. The prosecution, however, contended that Miller was legally sane at the time of the killing and urged the jury to consider the psychiatric evidence adduced from the prosecution's expert witnesses, with several testifying that they saw Miller looking normal during the time he and Standifer were together on the date of the murder. In the end, the jury found Miller guilty of murder in the first degree as charged.

On March 17, he was sentenced to death.

== Re-sentencing in 1987 and appeals ==
On May 29, 1984, the Tennessee Supreme Court heard David Miller's direct appeal against the trial verdict. Although the court upheld the murder conviction of Miller, the judges overturned the death sentence and ordered a re-sentencing trial for Miller based on the fact that his prior arrest for two rape cases (where no indictments were made) was improperly introduced as evidence during the original punishment phase of the trial.

In February 1987, a second trial by jury in relation to Miller's re-sentencing commenced, and at its conclusion, Miller was once again sentenced to death, after the jury found the murder of Lee Standifer to be "especially heinous, atrocious, or cruel". An appeal was filed to the Tennessee Supreme Court, but it was rejected on April 24, 1989.

On November 19, the Tennessee Court of Criminal Appeals rejected Miller's appeal.

On August 29, 2001, Miller's follow-up appeal was turned down by the Tennessee Supreme Court.

On September 13, 2012, the 6th Circuit Court of Appeals dismissed yet another appeal from Miller.

== Execution of Miller ==
=== Death warrant, lawsuit and selection of execution method ===
By 2018, David Miller had exhausted all avenues of appeal against the death penalty. It was around November 2018, when Miller received notification of his execution date: December 6. Miller was set to be the third death row convict in Tennessee to face execution in 2018.

After the issuance of his death warrant, Miller and three other death row prisoners – Nicholas Todd Sutton, Terry Lynn King and Stephen Michael West – filed a lawsuit against the state on November 5, seeking to be executed by firing squad instead of lethal injection, which was the state's primary method. They stated that the current lethal injection protocols in Tennessee could lead to prolonged and torturous deaths in light of the recent botched execution of Billy Ray Irick. In a decision signed on November 20, the U.S. District Court for the Middle District of Tennessee rejected the lawsuit. The 6th Circuit Court of Appeals also rejected the lawsuit on November 28, and the judges ordered that the scheduled executions of the four plaintiffs move forward.

Under Tennessee state law, inmates who were given the death penalty before 1999 were allowed to choose between two execution methods: lethal injection or electrocution (execution by the electric chair). Miller was eligible to make the choice since his death sentence was first imposed in 1982.

On November 27, 2018, Miller chose to be executed by the electric chair. He was the second person in Tennessee to select this execution method, after convicted murderer Edmund Zagorski, who was found guilty of a 1983 double murder and was executed by electrocution on November 1, 2018.

=== Final appeals and execution ===
As a final recourse to escape the death penalty, Miller petitioned to state governor Bill Haslam for clemency, and if successful, his death sentence could be commuted to life imprisonment. On the date of Miller's scheduled execution, Haslam announced that he would not grant Miller clememcy. Additionally, Miller also filed final court appeals all the way to the U.S. Supreme Court for a stay of execution, but the 6th Circuit Court of Appeals and the U.S. Supreme Court declined to postpone Miller's scheduled execution on December 4 and December 6, 2018.

On December 4, 2018, two days before his impending execution, Miller was moved to another cell closer to the electrocution execution chamber and placed on "death watch", a 72-hour time period where a death row inmate was under 24/7 surveillance and heightened security measures.

On December 6, 2018, 61-year-old David Earl Miller was put to death by the electric chair at the Riverbend Maximum Security Institution. For his final meal, Miller ordered fried chicken, mashed potatoes, biscuits and coffee. Miller's last words before his execution were, "Beats being on death row." Nine minutes after the electric chair was first activated, Miller was pronounced dead at 7:25pm. None of the family members of Standifer or Miller were present to witness the execution.

At the time of his execution, Miller, who had spent 36 years in prison, was the longest-serving death row inmate in Tennessee state history. He also became the third condemned criminal in Tennessee to be executed via the electric chair since 1960. It was noted that in recent years, due to increasing numbers of botched lethal injection executions, there were many criminals on death row across the U.S., including Miller, who chose to die by electrocution or other execution methods, and Miller was among the most high-profile cases of people who elected to be put to death by other methods rather than lethal injection. Miller's 36-year stay on death row also raised concerns about the issues within Tennessee's legal process that caused his death sentence to be carried out after more than three decades. Six more executions were scheduled in Tennessee after Miller's – four in 2019 and two in 2020. Across the U.S., a total of 25 inmates (including Miller) were executed during 2018.

=== Reactions ===
In response to the scheduled execution of her daughter's murderer, Helen Standifer stated that it was not necessary for her to witness the execution of Miller, because she was neither vengeful nor did she feel that her attendance could help her daughter, and she just wanted it to be over soon. Helen described Standifer as a "bubbly, happy character" who loved teasing her sister during Christmas and was active in sports during most of her schooling years at Colorado, where she used to live before moving to Tennessee, winning a gold medal in backstroke during a swimming competition. Helen stated that the loss of her daughter was still deeply felt even after 37 years, and remembered her daughter as someone who loved her job and was full of self-confidence in spite of her disabilities.

Jim Winston, the lead detective formerly in charge of investigating Standifer's murder, recounted the case during the final week of Miller's execution, and he stated that he had never forgotten about the gruesome nature of the murder even after more than three decades since its occurrence. Winston stated that the brutality of the crime was so much so that even the court could not allow the photos of the crime scene to be publicly presented and he himself found it hard to deliver the news to Standifer's family or testify about the killing. Winston stated that he still kept an article about the murder, and was still proud of his efforts to bring Miller to justice, from which the case could truly find closure once Miller's death sentence was carried out.

== See also ==
- Capital punishment in Tennessee
- List of kidnappings (1980–1989)
- List of people executed in Tennessee
- List of people executed in the United States in 2018

Executions carried out in Tennessee
Preceded by Edmund Zagorski November 1, 2018	David Earl Miller; December 6, 2018	Succeeded by Donnie Johnson May 16, 2019
Executions carried out in the United States
Preceded by Joseph Garcia – Texas December 4, 2018	David Earl Miller – Tennessee; December 6, 2018	Succeeded by Alvin Braziel Jr. – Texas December 11, 2018
