= Old Smoke =

Old Smoke may refer to:

- John Morrissey, American politician, bare-knuckle boxing champion and mob boss
- Sayenqueraghta, war chief of the Eastern Seneca tribe
- Old Smokey, a nickname used for the electric chair in New Jersey
