= Cecil Johnson Jr. =

American murderer (1956–2009)

- 2009 mugshot of Johnson
- Born: August 29, 1956; Maury County, Tennessee, U.S.
- Died: December 2, 2009 (aged 53); Riverbend Maximum Security Institution, Tennessee, U.S.
- Status: Executed by lethal injection
- Convictions: First degree murder (3 counts); Voluntary manslaughter Assault with intent to commit murder (2 counts); Armed robbery
- Penalty: Death

Details
- Victims: 4
- Span of crimes: 1980–1985
- State: Tennessee

Cecil C. Johnson Jr. (August 29, 1956 – December 2, 2009) was an American murderer convicted of killing four people in two separate incidents between 1980 and 1985. On July 5, 1980, Johnson committed a triple murder in the course of an armed robbery at a convenience store in Nashville, Tennessee, killing 12-year-old Robert "Bobby" Bell III, James Moore and Charles House; Johnson was found guilty of the triple murder and sentenced to death on January 20, 1981. While on death row, Johnson killed fellow death row inmate and serial killer Laron Williams on July 8, 1985, with the motive reportedly being anger over Williams using the prison telephone too much. Johnson was eventually executed by lethal injection on December 2, 2009 at the Riverbend Maximum Security Institution in Nashville, Tennessee.

== Personal life ==
Born in Maury County, Tennessee on August 29, 1956, Cecil C. Johnson Jr., the oldest of ten children, dropped out of school at the ninth grade and at the age of 21, he was married with one child. He later worked as a dishwasher and cook at Vanderbilt University in Nashville, Tennessee, up until he was arrested in 1980 for murder.

== 1980 Nashville triple murder ==
On July 5, 1980, in Nashville, Tennessee, an armed robbery broke out at a local convenience store, which resulted in the murders of two men and a 12-year-old boy.

On that day, the gunman, Cecil Johnson Jr., entered the store while armed with a gun, and at that time, the store owner, his son and a third man were present inside the store, and all three of them were held at gunpoint. Johnson demanded the trio to hand over the money from their cash register and put them inside his bag. At one point, when a mother and two children entered the store, Johnson hid away his gun and the trio were instructed to act naturally until the departure of the woman and her children. After the trio complied and handed out the money, Johnson shot all three hostages: the 12-year-old boy, Robert "Bobby" Bell Jr., was the first to be shot; Bell's father Bobby Bell Jr, was shot in the wrist while the third man, Lewis Smith, was shot in the throat and hand while attempting to protect the boy. While both Bell's father and Smith survived, Bell died from the shooting.

After leaving the store, Johnson gunned down another two people before he escaped the area. The two deceased victims were James Moore, a taxi driver, and Charles House, a passenger of Moore's taxi. In fact, moments prior to the shooting, House had actually entered the store in the middle of the robbery but Johnson threatened him to leave the store. Both Moore and House themselves died due to single gunshot wounds.

Johnson was arrested a day later on July 6, 1980, after the police identified him as a suspect through information provided by Bell's father. The Nashville store triple murder was one of six killings to occur during that same weekend in Nashville.

== Murder trial ==
On July 6, 1980, Cecil Johnson was charged with three counts of first degree murder and one count of armed robbery.

During his trial, Johnson denied that he was the killer, claiming that he was together with a friend and he never left the friend's car to commit robbery or murder. However, the friend, Victor Davis, testified that he had taken Johnson to the store and dropped him off, and Johnson returned to his car after committing the robbery, and he also told Davis that he did not "mean to shoot that boy".

At the end of the trial, Johnson was found guilty of first degree murder on all three counts. On January 20, 1981, Johnson was sentenced to death via the electric chair by Circuit Judge A. A. Birch Jr. upon the jury's unanimous recommendation for a death sentence. Johnson was the first person to be sentenced to death under Tennessee's new death penalty laws after the state reinstated capital punishment since 1976. Apart from the three death sentences, Judge Birch also imposed four life sentences for the charges of robbery and attempted murder (related to the shootings of both Bobby Bell's father and Lewis Smith). The judge set an execution date of May 20, 1981, for Johnson, although the execution would be stayed pending a mandatory appellate review by the higher courts.

After he was sentenced to death, Cecil Johnson Jr. was first incarcerated on death row at the Tennessee State Prison until 1989, before he and the state's other death row inmates were transferred to Riverbend Maximum Security Institution. As of 1991, Johnson was one of more than 80 inmates held on Tennessee's death row.

== 1985 prison killing and second trial ==
On July 8, 1985, his fourth year of incarceration, Johnson beat a fellow death row inmate to death. That inmate was convicted serial killer Laron Williams, who was sentenced to death for murdering a police officer and a priest. According to sources, the reason behind the fatal beating of Williams was due to the victim spending too much time on the telephone, which earned the displeasure of Johnson and his accomplice Tony Bobo (also a serial killer and death row prisoner), and a few more inmates. Prior to Williams's murder, Bobo was sentenced to death for the robbery-murder of Carolyn Doyle and life imprisonment for the murder of George Huffman Jr., and was also suspected in the third murder of Kenneth Willett.

On that day, Williams was attacked by Johnson, Bobo, and a group of other inmates in the exercise yard. During the assault, both Johnson and Bobo had reportedly dropped two thirty-five pound dumbbells on the victim's head and chest. This blunt force trauma led to the death of Williams. As a result, both Johnson and Bobo were charged with first degree murder. They were indicted for the offense in 1986.

Johnson and Bobo were both found guilty of second degree murder by a jury on June 23, 1987. Both men were sentenced to life imprisonment on July 17, 1987.

Four years later, on July 8, 1991, the Tennessee Supreme Court granted the appeals of both Bobo and Johnson and overturned their convictions, and ordered a re-trial. Upon their re-trial in February 1994, Both Bobo and Johnson were convicted of voluntary manslaughter, and re-sentenced to eight years in prison. Further appeals of both Bobo and Johnson were rejected on September 27, 1995.

Bobo later received another life sentence for the murder of death row inmate Thomas Lee Crouch on December 24, 1987. Bobo's original death sentence was commuted to life imprisonment in 1995 on the grounds of intellectual disability, and he later received two additional life terms for kidnapping and robbing a prison employee during a 1998 prison escape attempt.

== Appeals ==
On May 3, 1982, Cecil Johnson Jr.'s direct appeal against his death sentence was dismissed by the Tennessee Supreme Court. The court also set an execution date of June 29, 1982, for Johnson, although his lawyers expressed they would continue with their appeals against the death sentence, and hence the execution was delayed.

In October 1982, the U.S. Supreme Court rejected Johnson's appeal against his death sentence, and soon after, the Tennessee Supreme Court rescheduled Johnson's execution date as January 14, 1983. However, this execution was similarly stayed due to Johnson's appeals.

On January 20, 1988, the Tennessee Court of Criminal Appeals vacated the death sentences of Johnson and ordered a re-sentencing hearing.

On September 4, 1990, the Tennessee Supreme Court reinstated Johnson's death sentences.

On November 25, 1997, the Tennessee Court of Criminal Appeals dismissed Johnson's appeal and upheld his death sentence.

On April 29, 2008, Johnson's appeal was rejected by the 6th Circuit Court of Appeals.

== Execution ==
On July 22, 2009, the Tennessee Supreme Court signed Cecil Johnson's death warrant and scheduled his execution for December 2, 2009.

On November 30, 2009, U.S. District Court Judge Robert L. Echols denied Johnson's appeal for a stay of execution. The following day, on December 1, 2009, the 6th Circuit Court of Appeals rejected Johnson's appeal against his upcoming execution. Additionally, Governor Phil Bredesen refused to commute Johnson's death sentence to life without parole and hence denied the clemency appeal.

In his final appeal to the U.S. Supreme Court, Johnson submitted that it was "cruel and unusual punishment" for him to be incarcerated for 29 years on death row prior to being executed. A majority of the judges disagreed with Johnson's argument and dismissed his appeal. Reportedly, justice John Paul Stevens, who dissented, argued with justice Clarence Thomas regarding Johnson's 29-year stay on death row, with justice Stevens reportedly stating that Johnson should not be blamed for the procedural hurdles at the appellate stage that led to "underlying evils of intolerable delay" and thus "severe, dehumanizing conditions of confinement". However, justice Thomas rebutted that Johnson himself spent these 29 years filing multiple appeals in order to delay his death sentence, making use of the delay caused by these appeals to prevent the state from carrying out his death sentence.

On December 2, 2009, hours after the U.S. Supreme Court denied his final appeal, Johnson was put to death by lethal injection at the Riverbend Maximum Security Institution. The official time of death was 2:34am. Prior to his execution, Johnson declined to eat a last meal. Johnson spent his last hours with access to a telephone and television, also meeting with his family, a spiritual advisor, and lawyers. One of Johnson's sons, who was also in prison, sent him a message of forgiveness for his absence and inability to be a father. The father of Bobby Bell, one of Johnson's victims, attended the execution as a witness.

== Aftermath ==
Johnson had previously stated that he did not want an autopsy performed on his body. Autopsies were routinely performed on inmates who died of unnatural causes (including execution). Davidson County Medical Examiner Bruce Levy asked to carry out the autopsy as he wanted to ascertain if the state had properly carried out the execution in a manner according to law and protected Johnson's rights.

Two weeks after Johnson's execution, Davidson County Chancellor Russell Perkins ruled that Johnson would not be autopsied, according to his wishes, which were based on religious reasons. In January 2010, the Tennessee Court of Appeals upheld the lower court's ruling and agreed that it was not necessary to conduct an autopsy since the cause of death in Johnson's case was lethal injection, but also ruled that this decision would not bar the autopsies of other executed prisoners based on their religious beliefs.

For the next nine years, Johnson remained the last person to be executed in the state of Tennessee, as there were multiple legal challenges pertaining to capital punishment and the state's inability to acquire the drugs needed for lethal injection executions. Eventually, on August 9, 2018, Billy Ray Irick, who was found guilty of raping and murdering a young girl in 1985, was put to death by lethal injection, thus ending the state's nine-year moratorium on executions.

== See also ==
- Capital punishment in Tennessee
- List of people executed in Tennessee
- List of people executed in the United States in 2009

Executions carried out in Tennessee
Preceded by Steve Henley February 4, 2009	Cecil Johnson Jr. December 2, 2009	Succeeded by William Ray Irick August 9, 2018
Executions carried out in the United States
Preceded by Robert Thompson – Texas November 19, 2009	Cecil Johnson Jr. – Tennessee; December 2, 2009	Succeeded by Bobby Wayne Woods – Texas December 3, 2009
