= Philip Workman =

American man executed in Tennessee (1953–2007)

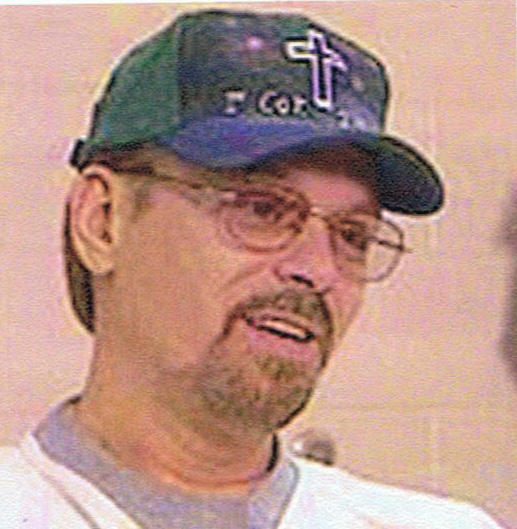
- Philip Workman in 2002
- Born: Philip Ray Workman; June 1, 1953; Fort Campbell, Kentucky, U.S.
- Died: May 9, 2007 (aged 53); Riverbend Maximum Security Institution, Nashville, Tennessee, U.S.
- Cause of death: Execution by lethal injection
- Motive: To avoid arrest
- Convictions: First degree murder Aggravated assault Burglary
- Penalty: Death (May 11, 1982)

Details
- Victims: Lieutenant Ronald Oliver; Memphis Police Department
- Date: August 5, 1981

Philip Ray Workman (June 1, 1953 – May 9, 2007) was a death row inmate executed in Tennessee on May 9, 2007. He was convicted in 1982 for the murder of a police officer following a robbery of a Wendy's restaurant in Memphis, Tennessee, and sentenced to death by lethal injection.

== Early life ==
Born on June 1, 1953, at Fort Campbell, Kentucky, Workman grew up in a military family on various Army bases. He later joined the Army. Shortly after his 1973 discharge, Workman was sentenced to 5 years in prison in Georgia for burglary and drug possession. He served 25 months. Workman also had a prior conviction for aggravated assault.

== 1981 armed robbery and murder of Lieutenant Oliver ==
In 1981, at 28 years old, Workman was living with his wife and 8-year-old daughter in Columbus, Georgia, and was heavily addicted to cocaine. That summer, he hitchhiked to Memphis where, on August 5, 1981, he robbed a Wendy's restaurant with a .45 caliber semi-automatic pistol.

During the robbery, an employee of the restaurant triggered a silent alarm after Workman granted her request to stand up to relieve a cramp in her leg. Three Memphis police officers, Ronald Oliver, Aubrey Stoddard, and Steven Parker, responded to the alarm. Upon their arrival, Workman attempted to flee across a nearby parking lot, where Lieutenant Ronald Oliver was then shot and killed. Workman shot another police officer in the arm and fired at a third police officer before being shot himself. Both Workman and the second officer recovered from their injuries.

== Murder trial ==
Workman was charged with the murder of Lieutenant Oliver. At the 1982 trial, Officers Stoddard and Parker testified that they had not fired their weapons, but that they had not seen Workman shoot Lt. Oliver. At his trial, Workman took the stand and admitted to firing the shot that killed Oliver, but claimed that he had not intended to kill him.

The prosecution presented testimony from an alleged eyewitness, Harold Davis, who stated that he had parked his car in the restaurant parking lot and was 10 feet away when he saw Workman shoot Oliver. The defense lawyers accepted the police version, conducted no forensic or ballistics analysis and did not investigate Davis. At the sentencing phase of the trial, they presented no mitigating evidence, for example, of the physical abuse Workman had suffered as a child, and his drug addiction as an adult. Workman was found guilty of murder during the commission of a felony by the jury (under the "felony murder" rule). The jury recommended a sentence of death, finding five statutory aggravating circumstances:

a) The defendant knowingly created a great risk of death to two (2) or more persons, other than the victim murdered, during the act of murder (Tenn. Code Ann. § 39-2-203(i)(3));

b) The murder was committed for the purpose of avoiding, interfering with, or preventing a lawful arrest or prosecution of the defendant or another (Tenn. Code Ann. § 39-2-203(i)(6));

c) The murder was committed while the defendant was engaged in committing, or was an accomplice in the commission of, or was attempting to commit, or was fleeing after committing or attempting to commit, the offense of robbery (Tenn. Code Ann. § 39-2-203(i)(7));

d) The murder was committed by the defendant while in lawful custody or in a place of lawful confinement or during the defendant's escape from lawful custody or from a lawful place of confinement (Tenn. Code Ann. § 39-2- 203(i)(8)); and

e) The murder was committed against any law enforcement officer, corrections official, corrections employee or firefighter, who was engaged in the performance of official duties, and the defendant knew or reasonably should have known that such victim was a law enforcement officer, corrections official, corrections employee or firefighter engaged in the performance of official duties (Tenn. Code Ann. § 39-2-203(i)(9)).

== Testimony of Harold Davis ==
At the 1982 trial, the case of the prosecution rested heavily on the testimony of Harold Davis, who claimed that he had been just 10 feet away from the crime scene and saw Philip Workman shoot Lieutenant Oliver. In November 1999, Harold Davis retracted his testimony, claiming that he called in the false lead to collect money to support his drug habit. Davis claims that he was threatened that harm would come to his family members should he change his testimony. Several other eyewitnesses have testified that they did not see Davis at the scene and the police report on the crime scene never noted Davis's presence. Steve Craig, an eyewitness to the shooting who did not testify at the trial due to illness, signed a statement in 1995 that he had a clear view of the parking lot and that he had not seen Davis.

Subsequent appellate proceedings, however, failed to establish the falsity of Harold Davis's original testimony. According to the Tennessee Court of Criminal Appeals, Davis's testimony at a 2002 hearing can be "best summarized" by the following exchange:

Prosecutor: You're not saying you lied, right?

Davis: Right.

Prosecutor: Ok. In the trial, you're not saying-

Davis: Right.

Prosecutor: -You lied about that?

Davis: Right. I'm not saying that.

Prosecutor: You just don't know.

Davis: I just don't remember. I just don't know . . . .I didn't lie.

The U.S. Court of Appeals, reviewing previous appellate decisions to decide a request for a stay of execution on May 4, 2007, found that, "The Tennessee courts . . . concluded that [the evidence] did not show that Davis lied at the trial. The state trial court found that the testimony did not amount to a recantation and did not show that Davis had lied during the trial."

== Ballistics evidence ==
Ballistics experts have questioned whether the bullet which killed Lieutenant Oliver could have come from Workman's gun. Many years after the trial, Dr. Cyril Wecht, a board member of the American Board of Legal Medicine, has testified that, "[I]t is my professional opinion, based upon a reasonable degree of medical certainty, that the gunshot wound to [Lt.] Ronald D. Oliver is not consistent with the type of ammunition used by Mr. Philip R. Workman. I do not believe that it was Mr. Workman's gun that fired the shot that fatally wounded [Lt.] Oliver." As Dr. Wecht was giving evidence many years subsequent to the death of Lt. Oliver, he did not examine the body in person. Rather, his professional opinion was given on the basis of studying photographs of the deceased.

Dr. Wecht based his opinion on the fact that Workman was using a .45 caliber gun and hollow point ammunition and that such bullets fired from such a gun more than 90% of the time do not pass through the body but remain within the shooting victim. Dr. Wecht's professional opinion was that when hollow point ammunition fired from a .45 caliber gun does pass through the body of the victim, the exit wound is almost always larger than the entry wound. According to medical examiner Dr. James Bell, the exit wound on Lt. Oliver's body was smaller than the entry wound. Such a wound is consistent with the .38 caliber weapons being fired by the police.

In January 2005, a retired Memphis police officer who went to jail for manufacturing phony drivers' certificates swore in an affidavit that the Memphis police covered up details of Oliver's shooting. Neither Officer Stoddard's nor Officer Parker's revolvers were examined in the course of the criminal investigation.

== Doubts of jurors, prosecutors, judges, and the victim's family ==
Five of the jurors, who convicted Workman in 1982, have since signed affidavits renouncing either the sentence or the verdict or both. Wardie Parks, a member of the 1982 jury, has stated that, "If the new evidence I reviewed had been presented at Workman's trial...I would have had a reasonable doubt whether Workman was guilty of first-degree felony murder, and I would have voted to acquit him of that charge." Parks has said that he did not hear any ballistics evidence during the original trial and believed the testimony of eyewitness Harold Davis.

In 2000, two justices on the Tennessee Supreme Court, Justice Birch and Justice Drowata, expressed their concern, although they were powerless to consider new evidence which might overturn the original verdict. Justice Birch called on then Governor of Tennessee, Don Sundquist, to commute Workman's sentence. Justice Drowata remarked, "The circumstances of this case are by no means as egregious as most of the death penalty cases I have reviewed [and] are less egregious than many of the life sentences I have reviewed . . . The date set for execution . . . affords the Governor sufficient time to carefully consider any executive clemency application that may be filed."

In 2000, both Lieutenant Oliver's daughter and the former District Attorney who prosecuted Workman called on the Governor to grant him clemency.

== Appellate proceedings ==
On March 30, 2001, just 37 minutes before Workman was scheduled to be executed, the Tennessee Supreme Court overturned a decision by Judge John P. Colton Jr. of the Shelby County Criminal Court to deny a writ of error coram nobis. The Supreme Court order stated that "if (Workman) did not fire that shot, he is not guilty of the crime for which he is scheduled to be put to death. ... No court in this state has actually held a hearing to fully evaluate the strength of these claims."

The subsequent appellate proceeding was presided over by Judge Colton, who had also presided over the 1982 trial in which Workman was originally convicted and sentenced to death. Following a series of acts deemed prejudicial to the defense, Workman's attorneys asked Judge Colton to remove himself from the case, but this was denied and the hearing proceeded with Judge Colton presiding. Observers contend that the subsequent trial was conducted in a manner biased against Workman, citing in particular the failure of Judge Colton to protect Mr. Davis and Dr. Wecht from abusive questioning by the District Attorney. Judge Colton also disallowed Wardie Parks, a member of the 1982 jury who has since renounced his verdict, to speak as a witness of new evidence.

On January 7, 2002, Judge Colton ruled against Workman, stating that the "new evidence presented by lawyers for death row inmate Philip Workman is insufficient to warrant a new trial." Judge Colton found that Harold Davis' statements "[did] not amount to a recantation of his original trial testimony," "were neither clear nor persuasive," and that "[t]he only definitive statement made by Harold Davis was that he did not clearly remember the events surrounding the death of Lieutenant Ronald Oliver."

With regard to the new ballistics information, Judge Colton found that "the jury essentially heard, through the testimony of [Federal Bureau of Investigation] Agent [Gerald] Wilkes, the same information provided by Dr. Wecht." Judge Colton noted that, while Dr. Wecht opined that the .45 caliber bullet fired from Workman's gun and recovered from the scene was not the bullet that killed Lieutenant Oliver and that it was unlikely that a .45 caliber aluminum-jacketed bullet would create an entrance wound considerably larger than the exit wound, he also admitted that "he could not conclusively exclude the possibility that a .45 caliber bullet caused the fatal wound," and "that it was possible for a .45 caliber, hollow-point bullet to create a smaller exit than entrance wound." Judge Colton found "no testimony, including that of Dr. Wecht, which affirmatively rules out the possibility that one of the other three to five bullets shot by Workman caused the fatal injuries," and that "the jury would have still heard the defendant's admission that he fired his weapon and that he indeed pointed the weapon at the victim."

== Final days ==
On Friday, May 4, 2007, the U.S. Court of Appeals for the Sixth Circuit refused, by a two-to-one decision, to grant a stay of execution for Workman. The stay had been requested on the grounds that "the Attorney General for the State of Tennessee . . . perpetrated a fraud upon the district court during Workman's habeas corpus proceedings". The majority opinion found that "On this record, Workman has not met his burden of showing a likelihood of success in demonstrating that the district court abused its discretion. Nearly twenty-five years after Workman's capital sentence and five stays of execution later, both the state and the public have an interest in finality which, if not deserving of respect yet, may never receive respect."

On Friday, May 4, a U.S. District Court Judge issued an injunction precluding the State of Tennessee from executing Workman until a preliminary injunction hearing assesses the constitutionality of Tennessee's revised procedure for administering lethal injections. However, this restraining order was vacated by a two-to-one decision of the U.S. Court for Appeals for the Sixth Circuit on Monday, May 7 and Workman was moved to death watch. The decision to vacate the restraining order was stridently criticized, on both procedural and substantive grounds, by the dissenting Judge Cole. Judge Cole wrote, "The majority's opinion rests on a profound jurisdictional defect: There is no appealable order before this Court. The district court issued a temporary restraining order, not a preliminary injunction . . . The district court's TRO cannot be magically transformed into a preliminary injunction, which is an appealable order, even though the State and a majority of this Court may wish it."

== Last meal request ==
Workman had no last meal request for himself. Instead, he asked that a large vegetarian pizza be given to a homeless person. The prison officials denied his request, and Workman refused to eat anything.

On May 9, 2007, homeless shelters across Tennessee received massive numbers of pizzas of various toppings from people all over the country honoring Workman's last meal request. "Philip Workman was trying to do a good deed and no one would help him," said one woman who, together with friends, donated $1200 worth of pizzas to Nashville's Rescue Mission. People for the Ethical Treatment of Animals (PETA) President Ingrid Newkirk, who donated 15 vegetarian pizzas, commented that "Workman's act was selfless, and kindness to all living beings is a virtue." Marvin Champion, an employee of Nashville's Rescue Mission, remarked, "I used to be homeless, so I know how rough it gets. I seen some bad times – not having enough food, the cupboards are bare. But we got pizza to feed enough people for a while."

== Execution ==
At 10:00 p.m. central time, the Supreme Court refused to hear any appeals. At 12:15 a.m. on May 9, 2007, the Tennessee state Supreme Court refused to hear his final appeal, which requested more time for the defense attorneys to review the injection procedures. When asked by Warden Ricky Bell what his last words would be, he stated "I've prayed to the Lord Jesus Christ not to lay charge of my death to any man." Two minutes after the start of the injections, he said "I commend my spirit into your hands, Lord Jesus Christ." His head then drifted to the left as he fell unconscious.

Philip Workman died at 1:38 a.m. (CDT) after a 17-minute procedure. Prison officials made the announcement that Workman had been executed at 1:50 a.m. on May 9, 2007.

== Post-mortem controversy ==
Although prior to his execution, Philip Workman was successful in obtaining a court order against autopsy, his demand that his body not be subjected to examination was still scheduled to be legally challenged in the days following his death. At issue was the legality of drawing blood and other bodily fluids from Workman's body. The position of state medical examiner Dr. Bruce Levy was that, "If the state is going to be executing people, as the medical examiner, it is my responsibility to ensure that the executions are carried out according to state law." At a hearing on the Monday following the execution, Philip's brother Terry testified that, "Philip was a Seventh-day Adventist at the time of his execution and strongly believed in non-desecration of the body after death." At the hearing, the court order barring autopsy was extended in order to give District Judge Todd J. Campbell time to issue an "opinion". On Friday, May 18, Judge Campbell allowed the state medical examiner to perform a "less-invasive autopsy".

== In popular culture ==
Workman is the subject of the songs "Not Innocent Enough" by Nanci Griffith and "Phillip Workman's Last Meal" by Shanghai River.

== See also ==
- Capital punishment in Tennessee
- Capital punishment in the United States
- List of people executed in Tennessee
- List of people executed in the United States in 2007
- Troy Davis

== Additional references ==
- Justice Denied: "Philip Workman"
- Amnesty International: "Death penalty / Legal concern: Philip Ray Workman" (April 27, 2007)
- Freedonian: "Just the Facts: The Philip Workman Case" (April 30, 2007)
- Freedonian: "Stranger Than Fiction: The People vs. Philip Workman" (May 4, 2007)
- CNN: "Interview with Philip Workman" (May 4, 2007)
- CNN: "Convicted killer fears his last moments" (May 4, 2007)
- Temporary Restraining Order in Philip Workman v. Gov Phil Bredesen et al. (May 4, 2007)
- ; archived from the original
- Tennessean.com: "Judges turn down appeal by Workman" (May 7, 2007)
- Tennessean.com: "Workman lands on death watch" (May 8, 2007)
- WSMV television news reports on the execution of Philip Workman (May 9th, 2007)
- Deadly Silence video on YouTube

== Bibliography ==
- Though You Slay Me, by Philip R. Workman: Case Account by Philip Workman himself, Canary Cottage Industries, 1999 - Canary Cottage Industries, PO Box 271718, Nashville, Tennessee, 37227.

Executions carried out in Tennessee
Preceded by Sedley Alley June 28, 2006	Philip Workman; May 9, 2007	Succeeded by Daryl Holton September 12, 2007
Executions carried out in the United States
Preceded by David Woods – Indiana May 4, 2007	Philip Workman – Tennessee; May 9, 2007	Succeeded by Charles Smith – Texas May 16, 2007
