= Robert Glen Coe =

American murderer (1956–2000)

- Born: April 15, 1956; Hickman, Kentucky, U.S.
- Died: April 19, 2000 (aged 44); Riverbend Maximum Security Institution, Nashville, Tennessee, U.S.
- Cause of death: Execution by lethal injection
- Convictions: First degree murder Aggravated kidnapping Aggravated rape
- Penalty: Death (May 1981)

Details
- Victims: Cary Ann Medlin, 8
- Date: September 1, 1979

Robert Glen Coe (April 15, 1956 – April 19, 2000) was an American murderer who was convicted of the 1979 rape and murder of eight-year-old Cary Ann Medlin in Greenfield, Tennessee. He was executed for the crime in 2000, becoming the first person to be executed in Tennessee in forty years.

== Early life ==
Coe was born on April 15, 1956, in Hickman, Kentucky. He grew up in a low-income family and attended Gleason School in Gleason, Weakley County, Tennessee. Coe's father would regularly get drunk and masturbate in front of Coe and his younger sister. He also forced the pair to watch him engage in sex acts with his oldest daughter.

== Kidnapping and murder ==
On September 1, 1979, Cary Ann Medlin and her stepbrother were riding their bicycles in the neighborhood near their home in Greenfield, Tennessee. Robert Coe pulled up next to them and began to talk to them, acting as if he knew Cary's father and needed directions to his house. Cary got into Coe's car to help him, and she was never seen alive again. As soon as she was reported missing, friends and neighbors in the close-knit community began a massive search to locate Cary or the man whose car she was last seen in. The following day, her body was found at the end of a road on the outskirts of town. An autopsy revealed that she had been sexually assaulted.

Coe had a long history of drug abuse, mental illness, and indecent exposure. Shortly after the crime, he told family members that he had killed someone, but they initially did not believe him. After hearing about the murdered girl, some of Coe's family members started to help him evade capture by buying him a bus ticket to Georgia, but another notified the police. Coe was captured at the bus station.

== Confession ==
Coe was arrested on September 4. He confessed to the murder three days later, giving a detailed description of the crime. Coe confessed that he drove Cary to an isolated spot on the outskirts of town and then, according to his confessional videotape, masturbated while the child watched. It is speculated that he also molested and raped her in his Ford Gran Torino or somewhere nearby. According to the same taped confession, he then became angry at her when she said to him repeatedly, "Jesus loves you" after witnessing his sexual act or possibly after his sexual assault. He then decided he was going to murder her. He went around to her side of the car and yanked her out of the car by her throat. He choked the eight-year-old until she turned blue, but he could not strangle her. He then told her to walk down the road, and while he walked behind her, he pulled out a pocketknife and stabbed her in the throat. She fell to the ground, grasping at her throat, and quickly bled to death.

== Execution ==
On April 19, 2000, he was executed at the Riverbend Maximum Security Institution in Nashville, Tennessee, by lethal injection. He became the first person to be executed by the state of Tennessee since 1976 when the death penalty was reinstated. Tennessee's last execution before Coe was in 1960.

== See also ==
- Capital punishment in Tennessee
- Capital punishment in the United States
- List of people executed in Tennessee
- List of people executed in the United States in 2000

Executions carried out in Tennessee
Preceded by William Tines November 7, 1960	Robert Glen Coe; April 19, 2000	Succeeded by Sedley Alley June 28, 2006
Executions carried out in the United States
Preceded by Robert Tarver Jr. – Alabama April 14, 2000	Robert Glen Coe – Tennessee; April 19, 2000	Succeeded by Ronald Boyd – Oklahoma April 27, 2000
