= Laron Williams =

American serial killer (1948–1985)

- Williams following his 1977 arrest
- Born: Laron Ronald Williams; October 5, 1948; New Orleans, Louisiana, U.S.
- Died: July 7, 1985 (aged 36); Hubbard Hospital, Nashville, Tennessee, U.S.
- Cause of death: Blunt force trauma
- Convictions: First degree murder (2 counts); Second degree murder
- Penalty: 10 years imprisonment (Wedlaw murder); Death (latter murders)

Details
- Victims: 3–5+
- Span of crimes: 1977–1981
- Country: United States
- States: Tennessee (possibly Georgia, Oregon, Washington and Illinois)
- Date apprehended: May 18, 1981

Laron Ronald Williams (October 5, 1948 – July 7, 1985) was an American serial killer. Originally convicted in the 1977 murder of a prostitute in Nashville, Tennessee and suspected in at least two similar killings, Williams later escaped from prison and murdered a police officer and a priest within days of one another in 1981. He was separately sentenced to death for both murders, but was killed by fellow inmates on death row in 1985 before he could be executed.

== Early life ==
Much of Williams' early life is shrouded in mystery. Prison records showed his birthdate as October 5, 1948, and his birthplace as Louisiana. However, during an interview on death row, Williams said that he was born somewhere outside of the United States. He was the fifth oldest of four sisters and six brothers of a father serving in the United States Army. By 1981, prison records showed both his parents were dead. Williams claimed that he saw little of his father when he was young, as the elder Williams was serving in Korea. However, after the war ended, he returned, and the family moved to Louisiana. Williams claimed that he entered high school in a town called "Newardton", a presumably fictitious location, as no records of such a place existing in the state have been located. After moving to Southern California, Williams finished high school and supposedly spent a year and a half in college studying psychology, but again, he refused to disclose the exact location. During the 1970s, he drifted around various parts of the country before permanently settling in Chicago, Illinois. Prison records listed Williams' birthplace as "Newardton", Louisiana. However, the Louisiana Historical Society confirmed no such place ever existed in Louisiana, with The Memphis Press-Scimitar reporting that Williams' most likely place of birth was New Orleans.

== Murders ==
=== Terra Wedlaw ===
Circa August or early October 1977, Williams went to stay at a friend's apartment at the Pagoda Garden Apartments in Nashville. On October 18, he solicited the services of a 19-year-old sex worker, Terra Wedlaw, who had arrived in the city just two months earlier from Tampa, Florida. The pair went to the Capitol Park Inn to have sex, but after they had finished, Williams strangled her and fled the premises. Just a few weeks later, he was arrested on murder charges by local authorities after the woman's birth certificate was found in his possession.

While he awaited his trial, it was publicly announced that Williams was a suspect in two similar murders that had occurred in Nashville: the strangulation murders of sex worker Mary Jo Corn (alias Larisa Ann Marsay) and bank teller Bessie Wallace, both 24. Both women were found nude and strangled in areas near the city, their hands and feet tied with rope, and each was killed within months of one another. As the killings were similar to that of Wedlaw, authorities suspected that Williams was their killer, and he was also under investigation for other similar murders in places such as Atlanta and Columbus, Georgia; Portland, Oregon; Washington and his residence in Chicago.

While awaiting trial at the Metro Jail, Williams was attacked by other inmates, receiving slight injuries for which he had to be treated at a hospital. To avoid further incidents, he was temporarily transferred to a jail outside the county while authorities worked on gathering evidence to charge him with the three strangulations. In the end, he was only charged in Wedlaw's death, and in January 1979, on the advice of his lawyer, he pleaded guilty and received 10 years imprisonment with a chance of parole after serving at least 4 years of the sentence. After his conviction, Williams was sent to the Fort Pillow State Prison, before being transferred to the Memphis Correctional Center in 1980. He was initially placed in a work release program to train as an electrical apprentice but was soon removed due to his violent outbursts.

=== Escape, further murders and recapture ===
On April 22, 1981, Williams climbed over the facility's fence and fled into town. He remained under the radar until May 12, when he was approached by 53-year-old Memphis Police Department lieutenant Clarence P. Cox, who attempted to arrest him. In the ensuing scuffle, Williams managed to snatch the lieutenant's gun from his holster and shot him in the head, killing him on the spot. After Cox's body was found on the next day, state authorities made a priority to capture the dangerous fugitive. Just two days later, Williams went to Jackson and burgled St. Mary's Roman Catholic Church, where he fatally shot the 35-year-old assistant pastor, Rev. John Jay Jackson. Three days later, he was finally captured by authorities at a restaurant next to a motel where he was staying.

== Trial, imprisonment and death ==
Following his arrest, Williams was separately charged with first-degree murder relating to the deaths of Cox and Jackson, each of which carried a possible death sentence. At the subsequent two trials, he was found guilty and sentenced to die in the electric chair. His initial execution dates were set for March 15 and July 14 of that year, but were delayed by automatic appeals to the Tennessee Supreme Court. During this time, Williams gave an interview to reporter Charles Thornton of the Memphis Press-Scimitar, where he discussed his case and reasserted his innocence, professing his belief that his convictions would be quashed and he would a free man after serving 1-to-5 years for the prison escape.

On July 8, 1985, during an exercise period at the Tennessee State Prison, Williams was attacked by a group of fellow death row inmates who proceeded to beat him with their fists and exercise weights. While the fight was quickly broken up, Williams was seriously injured and had to be driven to the nearby hospital, where he subsequently succumbed to his injuries. In the aftermath of the incident, prison authorities determined that the inmates' motive was that Williams had been spending too much time on the prison telephone, which angered them.

Two inmates, Cecil Johnson Jr. and Tony Bobo, were both convicted of second degree murder for killing Williams. On appeal, their convictions were overturned and reduced to voluntary manslaughter following a trial, after which they each received 8-year sentences. Johnson was executed for the 1980 triple murder which originally sent him to death row on December 2, 2009. Bobo had been on death row for the murder of a woman in 1983 and had also been linked to the murders of two men in 1982 and 1983. Bobo was later convicted of first degree murder for the murder of another fellow death row inmate, Thomas Lee Crouch, and received a life term, albeit his original death sentence was reduced to life in prison in 1995 after he was ruled to be intellectually disabled. Bobo was later sentenced to life without parole for crimes committed during a prison escape in 1998.

== See also ==
- List of serial killers in the United States

== Bibliography ==
- Robert Dailey III (September 16, 2014). Jackson: The True Story. ASIN B00NNROSZ0.
