= Bobby Wayne Woods =

American convicted murderer, kidnapper and rapist

- Born: October 11, 1965; Livingston, Texas, U.S.
- Died: December 3, 2009 (aged 44); Huntsville Unit, Texas, U.S.
- Status: Executed by lethal injection
- Convictions: Capital murder Attempted capital murder
- Penalty: Death

Bobby Wayne Woods (October 11, 1965 – December 3, 2009) was an American convicted murderer, kidnapper and rapist executed by the state of Texas for the murder and rape of 11-year-old Sarah Patterson in 1997. Woods also received a 40-year sentence for the abduction of Patterson's younger brother, whom he beat unconscious and left for dead but who survived. On May 28, 1998, Woods was sentenced to death for Patterson's murder and was executed on December 3, 2009, after a failed appeal based on Woods's low IQ.

== Biography ==
Bobby Wayne Woods dropped out of school in the seventh grade. He was barely able to read and write and he had to refer to a spelling list just to write simple notes to his family. He had IQ scores of 70 and 68 during elementary school. His IQ score right before his murder trial was 70, and another in 2002 returned 68. Woods also worked as a short-order cook and roofer.

On April 30, 1997, Woods entered the home of his ex-girlfriend Schwana Patterson through the open window of her children's bedroom; Patterson had expelled Woods two months earlier. Woods then kidnapped Patterson's two children, 11-year-old Sarah Patterson and 9-year-old Cody Patterson, and raped Sarah. After driving to a cemetery, Woods beat and stomped Cody's head, strangled Cody, and abandoned the boy at the cemetery. Cody notified police, and Woods told police that Sarah was dead and led the police to her body.

== Trial ==
Because the Woods case was heavily reported in Dallas-area media, Woods's trial was held in Llano, Texas. During his trial Woods admitted to kidnapping Patterson's children and beating Cody Patterson unconscious. A psychologist representing the defense but who did not evaluate Woods testified that Woods was intellectually disabled and no longer a threat to society. In response, a psychiatrist representing prosecution testified that Woods was not intellectually disabled and could commit future violent crimes. Woods, a resident of Granbury, Texas, was sentenced to death on May 28, 1998.

Patterson was also tried on charges of child neglect and was found guilty on October 14, 1998. She was sentenced to 23 years in prison.

== Execution ==
Woods was scheduled to be executed at 6 p.m. on October 23, 2008. However, the Texas Court of Criminal Appeals delayed the execution after lawyers raised issue that Woods's IQ would make him ineligible for the death penalty due to the United States Supreme Court case Atkins v. Virginia. That court ruled 8–1 on October 7, 2009, that there was insufficient evidence that Woods was retarded. The Supreme Court of the United States denied Woods's appeal hours before Woods's final execution day.

Woods was executed at 6:48 p.m. local time on December 3, 2009, in the Huntsville Unit state prison. He was the 50th murderer executed in the U.S. in 2009 and 1,186th since the U.S. Supreme Court ruled capital punishment constitutional in the 1976 case Gregg v. Georgia. In Texas, Woods was the 24th murderer executed in 2009 and 447th executed since 1976.

He is buried at Captain Joe Byrd Cemetery.

== See also ==
- Capital punishment in Texas
- Capital punishment in the United States
- List of people executed in Texas, 2000–2009
- List of people executed in the United States in 2009

Executions carried out in Texas
Preceded by Robert Thompson November 19, 2009	Bobby Wayne Woods; December 3, 2009	Succeeded by Kenneth Mosley January 7, 2010
Executions carried out in the United States
Preceded by Cecil Johnson Jr. – Tennessee December 2, 2009	Bobby Wayne Woods – Texas; December 3, 2009	Succeeded by Kenneth Biros – Ohio December 8, 2009
