= Bruce Mendenhall =

American serial killer

Bruce Delane Mendenhall
- TDOC Inmate Photo
- Born: April 14, 1951 (age 75); Crawford County, Illinois, United States
- Other names: The Prosti-Shooter; The Rest Stop Killer; The Truck Stop Killer
- Spouse: Linda
- Children: 3
- Status: incarcerated
- Convictions: Tennessee: First Degree Murder (2 counts); Solicitation of Murder; Abuse of Corpse; Indiana: Murder
- Penalty: Tennessee: Two consecutive life sentences with parole Indiana: 65 years

Details
- Victims: 3 convicted, 9+ suspected
- Country: United States
- States: Tennessee; Indiana
- Date apprehended: July 12, 2007
- Imprisoned at: Trousdale Turner Correctional Center

Bruce Delane Mendenhall (born April 14, 1951) is a convicted American serial killer. He was arrested in Tennessee in July 2007. He is currently serving two consecutive life sentences for the murders of Carma Purpura, Sara Hulbert, and Samantha Winters. A long haul trucker, Mendenhall's truck was found to contain the blood of numerous other murdered or missing women. He has been charged with the murders of three other women at truck stops in Alabama, Indiana and Tennessee. He is still under investigation for murders in Georgia, Illinois, New Mexico, Oklahoma, and Texas.

== Biography ==
Mendenhall grew up in Crawford County, Illinois. He was married with two daughters and a son.

== Arrest ==
A resident of Albion, Illinois, Mendenhall was arrested at the TA truck stop on Interstate 24 in Nashville, Tennessee, on July 12, 2007, after Detective Sgt. Pat Postiglione spotted a truck that matched surveillance footage from the night Sara Nicole Hulbert was murdered at the same truck stop. Upon inspection of the vehicle, a large quantity of bloody clothing and personal effects (including ID) of an Indianapolis woman named Carma Purpura, who had gone missing the day before, was found in a plastic sack along with blood spots scattered around the inside of his cab, even on the steering wheel and his hands. Mendenhall was arrested and taken into custody. Police catalogued 300 items from the truck, including a rifle, knives, handcuffs, latex gloves, several weapons cartridges, black tape, a nightstick, and sex toys. Sampling of these items turned up the DNA of five different women. On August 2, 2007, Mendenhall waived his right to a preliminary hearing.

== Victims ==
Mendenhall's victims were primarily young prostitutes, usually found shot, though detectives have determined that his method of killing may have changed over the years. During questioning, he implicated himself in the shooting death of Sara Hulbert, whose body was found on June 26, 2007.

He has also implicated himself in the shooting death of Symantha Winters, whose body was found on June 6, 2007, in a trash can at a truck stop in Lebanon, Tennessee. She had a criminal record showing at least one previous charge of prostitution. On August 17, 2007, a Wilson County grand jury indicted Mendenhall for the murder of Winters. He was subsequently convicted and sentenced to life.

Another victim killed on July 11, 2007, at a Flying J truck stop on Interstate 465 in Indianapolis, Indiana, was found. Carma Purpura, a 31-year-old mother of two, was last seen at the far-southside Indianapolis truck stop. On April 10, 2008, Marion County Prosecutor Carl Brizzi charged Mendenhall with murder in the case. DNA tests link a large quantity of the blood from Mendenhall's truck cab to the woman's parents. Investigators also found her cell phone, ATM card and clothing she wore on the day she disappeared. Four years later her remains were discovered just off I-65 in Kentucky.

On July 28, 2007, police in Birmingham, Alabama, charged Mendenhall with the murder of Lucille "Greta" Carter, who was found nude in a trash bin with a plastic bag taped around her head on July 1. She was shot with a .22 caliber weapon.

Investigators said Mendenhall was initially cooperative, but subsequently ceased to implicate himself in other murders. Police are investigating the possibility that Mendenhall is responsible for other murders in the region, including:

- Deborah Ann Glover, an Atlanta prostitute whose body was found near a Motel 6 in Suwanee, Georgia, on January 29, 2007. Police are certain that Mendenhall was in Georgia on the day Glover was shot.
- Sherry Drinkard, a prostitute from Gary, Indiana, whose body was found naked in a snow embankment
- Tammy Zywicki, a student who was found stabbed to death on September 2, 1992. She vanished from Interstate 80 near LaSalle, Illinois, nine days before, after dropping off her brother at Northwestern University.
- Robin Bishop, who was run over at a Flying J truck stop on Interstate 40 in Fairview, Tennessee, on July 1, 2007.
- Belinda Cartwright, a hitchhiker who was run over at a truck stop in Georgia in 2001. A composite police sketch made of the suspect based on information from witnesses bears a striking resemblance to Mendenhall.

Until August 2009, Mendenhall was considered in the murder of Jennifer Smith, a prostitute found nude at a truck stop in Bucksnort, Tennessee, in April 2005. DNA evidence in 2009 proved that she was the second victim of killer John Wayne Boyer.

== Trial ==
In 2018, Mendenhall was found guilty of first-degree murder in Tennessee. He received a life sentence for the murder of Samantha Winters and is connected to other murders in multiple states. He was also convicted of murdering Sara Hulbert.

In 2021, it was reported that Mendenhall was transferred to Indiana to stand trial for the 2007 murder of Carma Purpura. He has denied being a serial killer and claims to only be guilty of trusting a cop. In January 2025, Mendenhall was convicted of the murder of Purpura. In March of that same year, Mendenhall received a 65-year sentence for her murder. The sentence will run consecutive with the two life sentences he is serving in Tennessee. Due to Mendenhall's advanced age and the long appeals process, prosecutors never sought the death penalty and he serves his time as the Riverbend Maximum Security Institution outside Nashville.

Despite Jefferson County prosecutors having had enough evidence to go to trial over the murder of Lucille Carter, her family declined to move forward with the charges in 2025, citing Mendenhall's preexisting life sentences.

== See also ==
- List of serial killers in the United States
