= Murder of Traci Crozier =

1991 arson-murder of a woman in Tennessee

Traci Crozier
- High school yearbook photo of Traci Crozier
- Born: Traci Latrice Crozier; September 1, 1968; Tennessee, U.S.
- Died: April 18, 1991 (aged 22); Chattanooga, Tennessee, U.S.
- Cause of death: Burns
- Resting place: Rhea Memory Gardens
- Known for: Murder victim
- Father: Gene Crozier
- Family: Staci Wooten (sister)

On April 17, 1991, in Chattanooga, Tennessee, 22-year-old Traci Crozier (September 1, 1968 – April 18, 1991) was murdered by her former boyfriend, who confined her in her car and set the car on fire with a container of gasoline. Crozier suffered multiple burn wounds around more than 90% of her body and died in hospital the following day. The murderer, Leroy Hall Jr. (October 28, 1966 – December 5, 2019), alias Lee Hall, was found guilty of murdering Crozier and sentenced to death. About 28 years after the murder, Hall was put to death via the electric chair on December 5, 2019.

== Background and murder ==
On April 17, 1991, in Chattanooga, Tennessee, a 22-year-old woman was severely burned in her car by a fire set by her ex-boyfriend.

Prior to the incident, the victim, Traci Crozier, first met her attacker, Leroy Hall Jr. (alias Lee Hall), in December 1984. As they grew closer, their relationship developed into a romance in January 1986, and the couple began to live together that same month. The couple eventually broke off five years later, and on March 26, 1991, Crozier moved out of the house to live with her grandmother and uncle, Gloria and Chris Mathis. Even after the end of their relationship, Hall continually telephoned the house of the Mathis family in an attempt to get in touch with Crozier.

On April 6, 1991, 11 days before Crozier was attacked by Hall, the latter was sighted outside of the Mathis's house, with Crozier's car being set on fire. Chris witnessed the incident and fired a gunshot in the air, prompting Hall to flee from the scene; the fire was eventually put out by firemen called to the scene. When Hall called the house on that night, Chris warned Hall to leave his niece alone, and Hall reportedly said, "If I can't have her, nobody can't."

Between the final hour of April 16, 1991, and the midnight of April 17, 1991, Crozier was approached by Hall while she was inside her car, and Hall failed to persuade Crozier to reconcile with him. Reportedly, Hall threw a container full of gasoline at Crozier and set fire inside the car, causing Crozier to be burned all over her body, and at around 12.05am on April 17, Crozier was found outside her car with severe burn wounds across more than 90% of her body, with her hair melted and skin hanging from her arms. Earl Atchley, Commander of the Chattanooga Fire Department who responded to the scene, received information from Crozier that it was the same person, whom Crozier identified as Hall, who burned her and her car.

The next day, on April 18, 1991, Traci Latrice Crozier died at the age of 22 in Erlanger Hospital. According to Dr. Sonya Merriman, a burns specialist and plastic surgeon who treated Crozier, most of the injuries sustained by Crozier were third-degree burns, and her teeth were charred, and the hair was burned off her body. Despite the use of medication and painkillers, Crozier was said to be in constant pain before she died, and Dr. Merriman said that based on Crozier's condition, she would not survive her wounds, which was reportedly the worst case of burn injuries they had ever seen.

== Trial and sentencing ==
Leroy Hall Jr., then 24 years old when the murder occurred, was arrested soon after the crime, and although he initially denied his involvement in the murder, Hall eventually confessed to the murder. He was therefore charged with both premeditated first-degree murder and aggravated arson, and formally indicted by a Hamilton County grand jury in June 1991. For the most serious charge of first-degree murder, Hall potentially faced the death penalty under Tennessee state law.

From March 3 to March 11, 1992, Hall was tried before a jury in a Hamilton County trial court. Several experts were called to the stand to testify on the severity of Crozier's injuries and the damage caused by the fire itself. Mike Donnelly, an arson investigator with the State of Tennessee Fire Marshall's Office, also testified that the extensive damage suggested that gasoline had been poured directly onto the victim, and that the fire started directly from the driver's seat.

Hall took the stand to give his defence, and according to his testimony, Hall was drinking with two friends, Morris Forester and Jeffery Scott Green, on the early evening of April 16, 1991, hours before the murder happened. The three men drank approximately two and a half cases of beer, and thus becoming intoxicated. Forester went to bed around 10:30 p.m. and did not see Hall again. Green, who saw Hall between 10:30 and 11:00 p.m., tried to convince him to stay at Forester's house since Hall was too drunk to drive. However, Hall left, and neither Green nor Forester saw him again until after the murder. Hall testified that he went to look for Crozier in an attempt to reconcile, and drove around some of the places she went to, and when he stopped at the house of Crozier's grandmother at one point, he was threatened by Crozier's uncle.

Afterwards, Hall stopped at a service station, filled a tea jug with gasoline, and bought a cigarette lighter. He then took paper towels from a dispenser near the gas pumps, stuffed them into the tea jug, placed the jug in his car, and headed back to the area near the victim's grandmother's house. Hall said that he spotted Crozier in her car, and thus entered the car to talk to her. Crozier did not agree to reconcile with Hall and even asked him to surrender to the police. Hall did not comply, and instead, he asked Crozier to get out of the car as he wanted to burn it, but Crozier refused to, and the car was set on fire thereafter while Crozier was still inside. Hall denied that he did so to intentionally harm or kill Crozier, claiming he only wanted to burn the car and he denied intentionally dousing Crozier in gasoline.

The jury found Hall guilty of both counts of premeditated first-degree murder and aggravated arson at the end of his eight-day trial. After this, the same jury returned with their verdict, recommending the death penalty for Hall on the grounds that the murder was especially heinous, atrocious or cruel and that the murder was committed during the perpetration of arson. On top of Hall's death sentence, a jail term of 25 years was imposed for the other charge of aggravated arson in Hall's case.

== Appeals of Hall ==
After he was sentenced to death, Leroy Hall Jr. appealed against his death sentence and murder conviction. On December 30, 1996, the Tennessee Court of Criminal Appeals dismissed Hall's direct appeal.

On December 15, 1997, Hall's appeal was dismissed by the Tennessee Supreme Court.

In 1998, the U.S. Supreme Court denied Hall's petition for certiorari.

On August 22, 2005, the Tennessee Supreme Court turned down Hall's appeal for post-conviction relief.

On March 11, 2010, Hall's federal appeal was rejected by U.S. District Judge J. Ronnie Greer of the U.S. District Court for the Eastern District of Tennessee.

== Execution of Hall ==
Originally, a 2014 court order scheduled the execution of Leroy Hall Jr., who later went by the alias Lee Hall, to take place on January 12, 2016. The execution date was ultimately staved off for presumed legal reasons.

On November 16, 2018, the execution dates of six condemned inmates in Tennessee were set, and Hall, who was on the list, was slated to be put to death on December 5, 2019. On February 3, 2019, it was confirmed by NBC News that Hall's death sentence was scheduled to be carried out on December 5, 2019.

On November 7, 2019, Hall elected to be executed by electrocution in the electric chair. Under Tennessee state law, prisoners sentenced to death before 1999 were allowed to choose between the default method of lethal injection or the alternative method of electrocution via the electric chair.

Meanwhile, as a final resort to avoid the death penalty, Hall filed a series of last-minute appeals for a stay of execution and judicial review of his case. It was revealed during the final days leading up to Hall's execution that a former juror, addressed as "Juror A" in media and court sources, had not declared during the jury selection process about her past as a victim of repeated domestic abuse and rape by her former husband. Hall's counsel argued before the courts that the omission of Juror A's past trauma deprived Hall of a fair and impartial jury to determine his guilt during his trial. Hall's lawyers also asked the state governor to delay the execution to allow Hall more time to argue the breach of impartiality of his trial process.

On November 19, 2019, a Hamilton County judge turned down Hall's petition to rehear his case at the Hamilton County Criminal Court. On December 3, 2019, the Tennessee Supreme Court dismissed Hall's appeal and rejected his claims of juror bias. The following day on December 4, 2019, the eve of his scheduled execution, Hall lost his follow-up appeal to the 6th Circuit Court of Appeals.

On the same date when the Tennessee Supreme Court rejected his appeal, Hall was transferred to a different cell nearer to the electrocution chamber and placed on "death watch," a 72-hour period during which death row inmates are closely monitored with constant surveillance and enhanced security. During the final week before Hall's execution, Traci Crozier's family reportedly expressed support for the execution, with Crozier's sister Staci Wooten telling the press that she wanted Hall to be executed for her sister's murder. Wooten and Crozier's father Gene Crozier expressed that they were willing to attend Hall's execution, which they viewed as another death that was the only justice for the late Crozier.

On the evening of December 5, 2019, at 6.18pm, the U.S. Supreme Court rejected Hall's final appeal to delay his execution, which was slated to take place in less than an hour. Prior to the execution, Tennessee state governor Bill Lee declined to stop Hall's execution, and he detailed his decision in a statement, "The justice system has extensively reviewed Lee Hall's case over the course of almost 30 years, including additional review and rulings by the Tennessee Supreme Court. The judgment and sentence stand based on these rulings, and I will not intervene in this case."

On that same day, 53-year-old Lee Hall was put to death by the electric chair at the Riverbend Maximum Security Institution. Hall was pronounced dead at 7:26 p.m. Before his death, Hall said his last words, "People can learn forgiveness and love and will make this world a better place." An official final statement was released after Hall's execution, in which Hall apologized to the family of Crozier and expressed remorse for his actions.

For his last meal, Hall ordered a Philly cheesesteak, two orders of onion rings, a slice of cheesecake and a Pepsi.

Hall was the second blind prisoner to be executed for murder since the 1976 resumption of capital punishment in the U.S., and 13 years before him, convicted killer Clarence Ray Allen, who was put to death in California in 2006, was the first blind inmate on death row to be executed. Hall, who still retained his eyesight when the murder of Traci Crozier happened, lost his eyesight while on death row due to improperly treated glaucoma. Hall was one of the few condemned inmates from Tennessee since 2018 who chose to be executed by the electric chair. Hall was also the 21st condemned inmate to be executed in the U.S. in 2019.

In response to the execution of Hall, Staci Wooten, the sister of Traci Crozier, released a media statement, saying that the family had waited 28 years for the ordeal to end, and they were relieved with the fact that justice had been served, and expressed support for the execution of Hall. As for Hall's family, his brother David released a statement on behalf of his family, apologizing to the victim's family for the harm caused to them. David said that his brother admitted the truth and accepted his punishment, and he hoped for the Crozier family to find peace and closure. He added that Crozier was well-liked and accepted as part of their family while she was still dating Hall, and her death was no less a painful experience for Hall's family members.

== See also ==
- Capital punishment in Tennessee
- List of people executed in Tennessee
- List of people executed in the United States in 2019

Executions carried out in Tennessee
Preceded by Stephen Michael West August 15, 2019	Leroy Hall Jr. December 5, 2019	Succeeded by Nicholas Todd Sutton February 20, 2020
Executions carried out in the United States
Preceded by Ray Cromartie – Georgia November 13, 2019	Leroy Hall Jr. – Tennessee; December 5, 2019	Succeeded by Travis Runnels – Texas December 11, 2019
