= List of people executed in Tennessee =

This is a list of people executed in Tennessee. The state took over executions in 1913; prior to that time they were carried out at the county level.

There have been a total of 17 executions in Tennessee, under the current statute, since it was adopted in 1977. All of the people executed were convicted of murder. Of the 17 people executed, all were male. 11 were executed via lethal injection and 6 via electrocution. Another man, Steven Ray Thacker, was sentenced to death in Tennessee, but was executed in Oklahoma.

== Post-Gregg ==
No.	Name	Race	Age	Sex	Date of execution	County	Method	Victim(s)	Governor
1	Robert Glen Coe	White	44	M	April 19, 2000	Weakley	Lethal injection	Cary Ann Medlin	Don Sundquist
2	Sedley Alley	White	50	M	June 28, 2006	Shelby	Lethal injection	U. S. Marine Corps Lance Corporal Suzanne Marie Collins	Phil Bredesen
3	Philip Ray Workman	White	53	M	May 9, 2007	Shelby	Lethal injection	Memphis Police Lieutenant Ronald Oliver	Phil Bredesen
4	Daryl Keith Holton	White	45	M	September 12, 2007	Bedford	Electrocution	4 murder victims (Note: The 4 victims were: Stephen Holton, Brent Holton, Eric Holton, and Kayla Holton.)	Phil Bredesen
5	Steve Henley	White	55	M	February 4, 2009	Jackson	Lethal injection	Fred Stafford and Edna Stafford	Phil Bredesen
6	Cecil C. Johnson Jr.	Black	53	M	December 2, 2009	Davidson	Lethal injection	Bobby Bell Jr., James Moore, and Charles House	Phil Bredesen
7	William Ray "Billy" Irick	White	59	M	August 9, 2018	Knox	Lethal injection	Paula Kay Dyer	Bill Haslam
8	Edmund George Zagorski	White	63	M	November 1, 2018	Robertson	Electrocution	John Dale Dotson and James Wayne Porter	Bill Haslam
9	David Earl Miller	White	61	M	December 6, 2018	Knox	Electrocution	Lee Standifer	Bill Haslam
10	Donnie Edward Johnson	White	68	M	May 16, 2019	Shelby	Lethal injection	Connie Johnson	Bill Lee
11	Stephen Michael West	White	56	M	August 15, 2019	Union	Electrocution	Wanda Lou Romines and Sheila Ann Romines	Bill Lee
12	Leroy Hall Jr.	White	53	M	December 5, 2019	Hamilton	Electrocution	Traci Latrice Crozier	Bill Lee
13	Nicholas Todd Sutton	White	58	M	February 20, 2020	Morgan	Electrocution	Carl Isaac Estep (Note: Sutton also received life sentences for the murders of Dorothy Virginia Sutton, John Michael Large, and Charles Pomery Almon III.)	Bill Lee
14	Oscar Franklin Smith	White	75	M	May 22, 2025	Davidson	Lethal injection	Judith Lynn Smith, Chad Altmon Burnett, and Jason Don Burnett	Bill Lee
15	Byron Lewis Black	Black	69	M	August 5, 2025	Davidson	Lethal injection	Angela Clay, Latoya Clay, and Lakeisha Clay	Bill Lee
16	Harold Wayne Nichols	White	64	M	December 11, 2025	Hamilton	Lethal injection	Karen Elise Pulley	Bill Lee
17	Anthony Darrell Dugard Hines	White	66	M	August 13, 2026	Cheatham	Lethal injection	Catherine Jean Jenkins	Bill Lee

=== Demographics ===
Race
White	15	88%
Black	2	12%
Age
40–49	2	12%
50–59	8	47%
60–69	6	35%
70–79	1	6%
Sex
Male	17	100%
Date of execution
1976–1979	0	0%
1980–1989	0	0%
1990–1999	0	0%
2000–2009	6	35%
2010–2019	6	35%
2020–2029	5	29%
Method
Lethal injection	11	65%
Electrocution	6	35%
Governor (Party)
Ray Blanton (D)	0	0%
Lamar Alexander (R)	0	0%
Ned McWherter (D)	0	0%
Don Sundquist (R)	1	6%
Phil Bredesen (D)	5	29%
Bill Haslam (R)	3	18%
Bill Lee (R)	8	47%
Total	17	100%

== See also ==
- Capital punishment in Tennessee
- Capital punishment in the United States
- List of people executed in Tennessee (pre-1972)
