= Murder of Suzanne Marie Collins =

1985 murder of a United States Marine

Suzanne Marie Collins
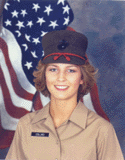
- Born: June 8, 1966
- Died: July 12, 1985 (aged 19); Millington, Tennessee, U.S.
- Military career
- Allegiance: United States
- Branch: United States Marine Corps
- Service years: 1984-1985
- Rank: Lance Corporal
- Unit: Naval Support Activity Mid-South

Suzanne Marie Collins (June 8, 1966 – July 12, 1985) was a United States Marine Corps Lance Corporal who was tortured, raped, and murdered by Sedley Alley in 1985. At the time of her murder she was stationed at Naval Support Activity Mid-South in Millington, Tennessee. Collins was a student undergoing training at the base, and was scheduled to graduate from avionics training on the day of her murder. She is buried in Arlington National Cemetery.

== Early life and education ==
Suzanne Collins was the daughter of Jack and Trudy Collins. She graduated from Robert E. Lee High School in Fairfax County, Virginia.

== Abduction and murder ==
On the evening of July 11, 1985, Suzanne Collins was abducted while jogging on the base, and was taken to nearby Edmund Orgill Park. There, the kidnapper severely beat Collins, fracturing her skull, before repeatedly shoving a tree limb up her vagina with enough force to penetrate her abdomen and tear one of her lungs. The autopsy would state that Collins died from blunt force trauma to the head and internal hemorrhaging from the tree limb. The kidnapper then ditched the body and fled the scene.

Two Marines jogging near where Collins was abducted heard her scream and ran toward the sound. However, as they reached the scene, they saw a car leaving the area. They reported to base security and accompanied officers on a tour of the base, looking for the car. Unsuccessful, they returned to their barracks, but soon the Marines were called back to the security office. There they identified a car which belonged to a man named Sedley Alley. The car had also been stopped by officers. While being questioned, Alley and his wife gave statements to the base security personnel accounting for their whereabouts. The security personnel were satisfied with Alley's story, and Alley and his wife returned to their on-base housing. The two Marine witnesses returned to the security office shortly after Alley and his wife departed. The Marines disputed the couple's version of events, citing that the loud, distinct sounds made by the muffler on Alley's car matched those sounds they had heard prior to and during Collins' abduction. The security personnel indicated that since no one had yet been reported missing, there was nothing more that could be done. The Marines were thanked for their assistance and told to return to their barracks.

Collins' body was discovered the next morning by sheriff's deputies, after her roommate reported her missing. Clothes, including a man's red underwear, were found close by. When word got to the base of the murder, Alley was immediately arrested by military police. He voluntarily gave a statement to the police, admitting to having killed Collins but gave a substantially false account of the circumstances of the killing. He claimed that his wife Lynne went to a Tupperware party, which had angered him. He drank two six-packs of beer and a bottle of wine. He told authorities that he had gone out for more liquor when his car accidentally hit Collins as she jogged near the air base. He also claimed he accidentally killed the young woman when she fell on a screwdriver he was holding as he was trying to help her. He said he had inserted the tree branch into her vagina postmortem to make it look like she was raped and murdered. However, an autopsy revealed that her skull had been fractured as the result of suffering repeated beatings, there were no screwdriver wounds, and no wounds consistent with being hit by a car.

== Trial and execution of Alley ==
Alley's trial was held in March 1987. The evidence against Alley included the confession as well as blood and hair evidence. Collins' blood and hair had been found on the headlight and driver's side door of Alley's car. More blood was found on Alley's shorts and on a napkin in his car, but it could not be proven if it belonged to Collins. The jury also heard that, on the night of the murder, Alley had stolen a pump and gauges from the area where Collins was jogging, which the prosecution argued placed him at the crime scene. When the inconsistencies between Alley's confession and the crime scene were noted, prosecutors suggested that Alley was downplaying the crime to make himself look better. Alley himself said that he had confessed because the police threatened to arrest his wife unless he told them what they wanted to hear. Alley's defense was that he had multiple personality disorder and did not remember committing the crime, which two psychologists supported. Alley was convicted on March 17, 1987, of murder in the first degree and on May 18, 1987, was sentenced to death. He was also convicted of aggravated kidnapping and aggravated rape, for which he received consecutive forty-year sentences. He was scheduled to die by electrocution on May 2, 1990, but was reprieved indefinitely by the state Court of Criminal Appeals.

A Shelby County judge denied Alley's initial request for state-funded DNA testing of 11 samples of physical evidence, saying Alley had not shown "reasonable probability" that he wouldn't have been prosecuted or convicted if the tests were in his favor. A further appeal in 2004 requested DNA testing on hairs found on Collins' waistband and on the soles of her feet, a pubic hair found in her shoe, and hairs found on the tree branch which was used to rape her. This request was denied, with the court holding that this evidence would not exonerate Alley even if it was found to belong to someone else, as it could easily be the result of innocent everyday contact and there was no evidence it belonged to the killer. The court also questioned if the killer would have left DNA on Collins' body since she was raped with a foreign object.

After numerous appeals, Alley was executed by lethal injection at the Riverbend Maximum Security Institution in Nashville, Tennessee, on the morning of June 28, 2006; he was pronounced dead at 2:12 a.m. The length of Alley's appeals process caused Collins' family to successfully work for limitations on groundless habeas corpus appeals. The amount of time between the murder and Alley's execution (20 years, 11 months, 14 days) was longer than Suzanne Collins had been alive (19 years, 1 month, 4 days) when she was killed.

On April 30, 2019, Alley's daughter petitioned the Criminal Court for Shelby County for the DNA test that was denied prior to his execution. A judge denied the request on November 18, 2019.

In 2021, the Innocence Project teamed up with conservative litigator and former solicitor general resident for President George W. Bush, Paul Clement, to launch an appeal to the Tennessee Court of Criminal Appeals on behalf of the estate Sedley Alley. According to the Innocence Project, there was weak physical and eyewitness identification evidence against him. The tire tracks found at the crime scene were not from Sedley's vehicle, and recovered shoe prints did not match his shoes. Key eyewitness accounts also did not match Alley's description (the witnesses described a 5-foot 6-inch to 5-foot 8-inch man with short brown hair and dark complexion while Alley was a 6-foot 4-inch man with medium red hair and a light complexion). Alley told members of his legal team that he was coerced into confessing to a crime he did not commit. In addition, one of the other students in Collins' class (Thomas Bruce) was proven to be a killer 20 years later while her boyfriend John Borrup not only matched the description but was unaware that she had been seeing another man. On May 7, 2021, the Tennessee Court of Criminal Appeals denied the petition.

== Advocacy of Jack and Trudy Collins ==
After the murder, the Collinses dealt with their grief in part by joining a Fairfax County support group for surviving members of homicide victims led by Carroll Ellis and Sandra Witt. They began attending the hearings and criminal proceedings of the man who would be convicted of murdering their daughter. Their involvement with the support group led both Collinses to become deeply involved with activism and reform work.

With the appeals of Alley stretching into years, the Collinses became frustrated with the long habeas corpus appeals and continuing delay of Alley's sentence. In March 1991, Jack Collins addressed delegates at the Crime Summit in Washington, D.C., convened by then Attorney General Richard Thornburgh. Collins's statement was about the lack of finality with criminal convictions and pressing for reform.

In the early 1990s, Jack and Trudy Collins served as the Eastern Regional Directors of Citizens for Law and Order, based in Oakland, California. Jack Collins worked with Executive Director Lee Chancellor of the Judicial Reform Foundation to create a pamphlet on habeas corpus abuses and history of the judicial process. On May 7, 1991, Jack Collins testified before Congress on habeas corpus reform and the endless appeals that Alley was requesting, and supported the State's decision to stop DNA testing. Trudy Collins was in attendance in support of her husband.

The Collinses have also established a scholarship named the Suzanne Marie Collins Perpetual Scholarship, first awarded in 1996.

== See also ==
- Capital punishment in Tennessee
- Capital punishment in the United States
- List of people executed in Tennessee
- List of people executed in the United States in 2006

Executions carried out in Tennessee
Preceded by Robert Glen Coe April 19, 2000	Sedley Alley; June 28, 2006	Succeeded by Philip Workman May 9, 2007
Executions carried out in the United States
Preceded by Ángel Maturino Reséndiz – Texas June 27, 2006	Sedley Alley – Tennessee; June 28, 2006	Succeeded by Sean Derrick O'Brien – Texas July 11, 2006
