= Julius Morgan =

First person to be executed by electric chair in Tennessee

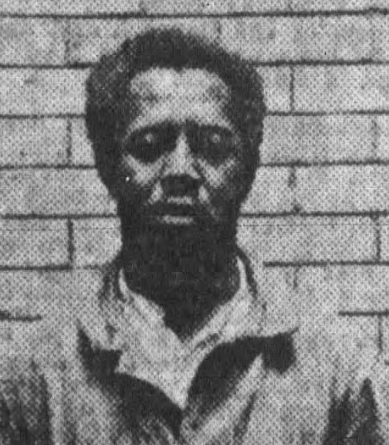
- Morgan, pictured in the Nashville Banner on July 13, 1916
- Born: c. 1894; Arkansas, U.S.
- Died: July 13, 1916 (aged 21–22); Tennessee State Prison, Tennessee, U.S.
- Known for: First person executed by electric chair in Tennessee
- Status: Executed by electric chair
- Convictions: Rape; Assault
- Penalty: Death

Julius Morgan (c. 1894 – July 13, 1916) was an American criminal who was the first prisoner executed by the electric chair in Tennessee, after being convicted for the rape of a twenty-year-old woman. He claimed to have served one year in an Arkansas prison for assault before escaping to Tennessee. Morgan unsuccessfully sought clemency from the Tennessee Supreme Court and Governor Thomas Clarke Rye before admitting his guilt at his execution.

== Background ==
Julius Morgan claimed to be twenty-two years old in 1916, and came to Tennessee from Arkansas. Morgan stated that he had been convicted for the assault of a woman after entering her home in Arkansas in 1913, for which he was sentenced to two years in prison. He escaped from prison one year into his sentence, but was recaptured before escaping again and moving to Tennessee.

Morgan was working with his brother-in-law and uncle at a farm in Dyer County. Morgan was accused of criminally assaulting Laura Sullivan on February 1, 1916, near Dyersburg, Tennessee. The crime occurred when Sullivan, described in news reports as a twenty-year-old white woman who was selling "toilet articles", came to a house where Morgan was working. Morgan pursued the woman and assaulted her in the street. He was captured about twelve hours later in Maury City. The sheriff of Dyer County moved Morgan to Jackson to protect him from a mob of vigilantes who planned to lynch him.

== Trial and petitions for clemency ==
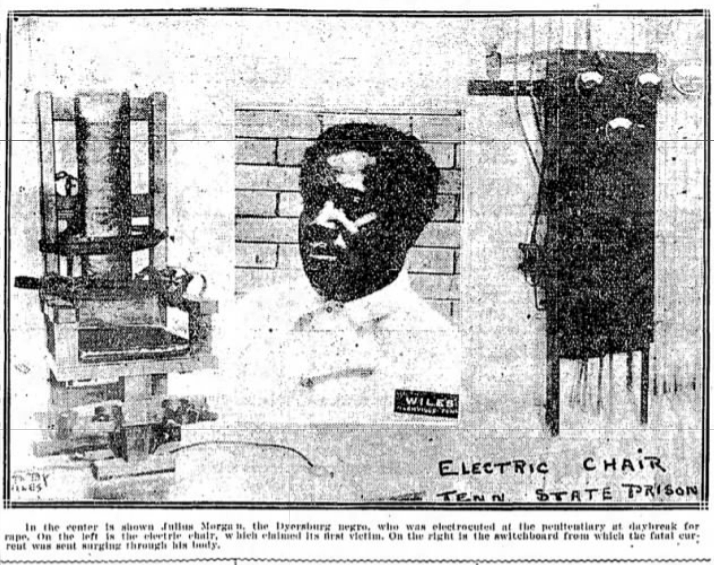
A photo of Morgan and the electric chair used to execute him

Morgan appeared in court with three lawyers and was granted a change of venue to Memphis. On March 27, 1916, Morgan was being held in the Memphis jail. The Shelby County sheriff, one Reichman, ordered guards to protect Morgan from lynch mobs. He was convicted of the crime of rape on April 3, and a motion for a new trial was denied.

The Tennessee General Assembly passed legislation on September 27, 1913, making the electric chair the official method of execution in the state and required all executions to be held in Nashville. The legislation was signed into law by Governor Ben W. Hooper.

By June 1916 the Tennessee Supreme Court had affirmed the decision to execute Morgan. After the Supreme Court refused to overturn the death penalty, Morgan attempted to gain clemency from the governor. These attempts culminated in a visit by Governor Thomas Clarke Rye on July 10, 1916. Morgan talked to Rye about his crime, but Rye made no promise to grant clemency. Several people had asked the governor to grant clemency, including the Nashville "Colored Men's Branch" of the YMCA, to no avail.

== Execution ==
Morgan was singing songs with religious leaders before being moved to the penitentiary to await execution. At 5:00 pm on July 12, 1916, he was led to an automobile for transport while hundreds of people gathered to see him transported.

On July 13, 1916, Morgan had a last meal of watermelon at the penitentiary. Morgan's head was then shaved and he was strapped into the electric chair at 4:38 am. At 4:41 am a guard flipped the switch and sent the electricity to the chair. The first jolt of electricity did not kill Morgan and the electricity was sent to the chair a second time. Morgan was pronounced dead by a doctor at 4:45 am.

Morgan admitted his guilt before his execution. "I was good once. Then I went to drinking bootleg whisky and when the showdown come—it got me." (Note: He gave a statement to the YMCA prior to his death: "I got in the habit of taking a drink of whisky in the mornings when it was cold and frosty, and the habit grew upon me. The next thing to whisky, that led to my ruin, was bad women. I would advise young men to stay away from the red light district. Bad women, like bad whisky, will lead young men and old men alike to destruction. . . . My father was a sinner and a gambler. He was shot down without a moments notice. He is today in hell where every body ought to pray to shun. Boys who are invited to church ought to take heed.")

His body was delivered to his mother in Arkansas. Since his execution there have been 130 prisoners put to death using the electric chair in Tennessee.

In 1977, the U.S. Supreme Court ruled that the death penalty for the rape of an adult was unconstitutional in Coker v. Georgia.

== See also ==
- Capital punishment in Tennessee
- List of people executed in the United States in 1916
- List of people executed by electrocution
