= 2019 Sumner County murders =

Mass murder in Tennessee, United States

- Location: Sumner County, Tennessee, U.S.
- Date: April 17/27, 2019
- Attack type: bludgeoning; spree killing; Familicide; mass killing
- Weapon: Unknown blunt weapon
- Deaths: 9 (including one victim who died in 2022)
- Injuries: 0
- Perpetrator: Michael Lee Cummins

On April 17 and April 27, 2019, eight bodies were discovered at multiple locations in Sumner County, Tennessee. The sole survivor, left in critical condition, died in 2022 due to major health problems after the injuries. A suspect, identified as Michael Cummins, was arrested for all nine attacks. The case was the worst mass killing in Tennessee in 20 years.

== Murders ==
On April 17, a headless body was discovered inside a burnt cabin. Ten days later, on April 27 and into the following day, responding police officers found seven additional victims and one survivor at multiple crime scenes. The slain victims included four members of the Cummins family, who were slain in their home at Charles Brown Road; another victim found on Luby Brown Road; and two others. The victims were the mother, father, and uncle of perpetrator Michael Cummins; the uncle's girlfriend; and two members of the girlfriend's family. One of the deceased victims was a 12-year-old girl who was partially nude but was not sexually assaulted. All of the deaths were caused by blunt-force trauma to the head. The funeral for three victims occurred on May 5. The funeral for three other victims was on May 8.

The evidence at trial showed that Cummins first killed James Fox Dunn Jr. on April 17, 2019, whose home was burned and rifle was stolen. Several days later on April 24, Cummins killed 69-year-old Shirley Fehrle, a retired nurse. Prosecutors believe Cummins did not know Fehrle and killed her in order to steal her car. The following day, Cummins killed six people inside a trailer home.

== Victims ==
- James Fox Dunn Jr.
- David Cummins - 51
- Clara Cummins - 44
- Charles Hosale - 45
- Rachel McGlothin-Pee - 43
- Sapphire McGlothin-Pee - 12
- Shirley Fehrle - 69

The first victims were found in the Cummins’ Trailer and Shirley was found Luby brown road.

== Perpetrator ==
The killer was identified as another member of the Cummins family, Michael Cummins. He had a troubled history, such as an ex-girlfriend getting a restraining order. He was slated to be arrested in the days before the bodies were found since he had violated probation by not having a mental health evaluation. A warrant was subsequently issued. After the bodies of the victims were discovered, Cummins was considered a suspect due to not being found. He was later spotted and shot after he was cornered near a creek by multiple police officers. However, his trial was delayed many times due to the COVID-19 pandemic. On June 9, 2022, he was found fit to stand trial.

On August 16, 2023, Cummins pleaded guilty in the murders to avoid the death penalty and was sentenced to eight life sentences. He is incarcerated at Riverbend Maximum Security Institution in Nashville.
