= Daryl Holton =

American mass murderer (1961–2007)

- Holton in 1999
- Born: Daryl Keith Holton; November 23, 1961; Shelbyville, Tennessee, U.S.
- Died: September 12, 2007 (aged 45); Riverbend Maximum Security Institution, Nashville, Tennessee, U.S.
- Cause of death: Execution by electrocution
- Children: 4 (killed all)
- Motive: Custody dispute
- Conviction: First degree murder (4 counts)
- Penalty: Death

Details
- Date: November 30, 1997
- Country: United States
- Location: Shelbyville, Tennessee
- Targets: His children and stepchildren
- Killed: 4
- Weapon: SKS rifle

Daryl Keith Holton (November 23, 1961 – September 12, 2007) was a convicted child murderer and mass murderer who was executed by electrocution by the state of Tennessee on September 12, 2007, in Riverbend Maximum Security Institution in Nashville.

== Background ==
Holton married Crystal Holton in 1984, and they had three children. Due to Crystal deserting the children numerous times while Holton was away in the military, he took his leave from the military and divorced his wife in June 1992, which left him with custody of the children. Crystal was impregnated by another man in late 1992 and started living with her ex-husband again afterward, with the child being born in June 1993. They separated again after Holton struck Crystal for her alcoholism and this time, Crystal took custody of the children. In 1995, she called the police on him for threatening her and she got an order of protection against him in 1997.

== Crime ==
Holton, a Gulf War veteran, was 36 years old when he fatally shot his three young sons and their half-sister: Stephen Edward Holton (12), Brent Holton (10), Eric Holton (6), and Kayla Marie Holton (4) with a Chinese-made semi-automatic rifle on November 30, 1997, at the garage where he worked in Shelbyville, Tennessee. Holton was divorced, and his ex-wife had custody of the children. About an hour later, Holton turned himself in to the Shelbyville police; he told investigators that he had killed the children because "families should stay together; a father should be with his children." He said he had also planned to kill his ex-wife and then himself but had changed his mind.

== Trial ==
At his June 1999 trial, Holton declined to testify on his own behalf, although his attorney sought to convince the jury that Holton was mentally incompetent at the time of the killings. Witnesses for the defense testified that Holton showed signs of carbon monoxide poisoning, although they could not definitively conclude that he had been exposed to carbon monoxide. Psychiatrists for the state and the defense also testified that Holton had major depressive disorder and passive-aggressive personality disorder at the time of the murders. The jury rejected the insanity defense; Holton was found guilty and sentenced to death.

During his imprisonment, Holton became an amateur legal expert, and he took steps to ignore the automatic and voluntary appeals process afforded to all condemned men and women under state and U.S. law. He also declined to cooperate with the federally or state-appointed capital defenders who sought to offer him legal assistance and counsel. For this reason, he is often included among the group described as death row "volunteers".

== Execution ==
Holton chose to die in the electric chair, rather than by lethal injection, which is now the standard method of execution in Tennessee. Death-row inmates who committed their capital crime when the electric chair was still the official execution method are permitted to choose between the two methods. Holton was the first person to be executed by electrocution in Tennessee in 47 years. Moments before his execution, prison warden Ricky Bell asked Holton if he had any final words. He replied: "Two words: I do." He declined the traditional special last meal before his execution and instead, ate the regular prison meal which consisted of riblets on a bun, mixed vegetables, baked beans, white cake with white icing and iced tea.

Holton's was the fourth execution in Tennessee since 2000 and first by the electric chair since 1960 (the last pre-Furman execution). It was also the first use of Tennessee's electric chair after it was retrofitted by Fred A. Leuchter and moved to Riverbend from the former Tennessee State Prison. Holton was the third death row inmate executed under administration of Governor Phil Bredesen. He was also the first American put to death by electrocution since July 20, 2006. The last was Brandon Wayne Hedrick in Virginia, who also chose electrocution over injection. His body was cremated after his execution.

== Controversy ==
His case raised some controversy because of rumors about his history of mental illness. Execution of the mentally disabled was prohibited by the 2002 U.S. Supreme Court case Atkins v. Virginia.

Holton, his motives, and the ethics of his execution are examined in the 2008 documentary film Robert Blecker Wants Me Dead.

== See also ==
- Capital punishment in Tennessee
- Capital punishment in the United States
- John Battaglia
- Edmund Zagorski, the second post-Furman execution by electrocution in Tennessee
- List of people executed in Tennessee
- List of people executed in the United States in 2007
- List of white defendants executed for killing a black victim
- Race and capital punishment in the United States

Executions carried out in Tennessee
Preceded by Philip Workman May 9, 2007	Daryl Holton; September 12, 2007	Succeeded by Steve Henley February 4, 2009
Executions carried out in the United States
Preceded by Tony Roach – Texas September 5, 2007	Daryl Holton – Tennessee; September 12, 2007	Succeeded by Clifford Kimmel – Texas September 20, 2007
