= Billy Ray Irick =

American murderer (1958–2018)

- Born: August 26, 1958; Knoxville, Tennessee, U.S.
- Died: August 9, 2018 (aged 59); Riverbend Maximum Security Institution, Tennessee, U.S.
- Status: Executed by lethal injection
- Convictions: First degree murder Aggravated rape (2 counts)
- Penalty: Death (December 3, 1986)

Details
- Victims: Paula Kay Dyer, 7
- Date: April 15, 1985

William Ray Irick (/ˈaɪrɪk/ EYE-rik, August 26, 1958 – August 9, 2018) was an American convicted murderer from Tennessee who was sentenced to death and executed for the 1985 rape and murder of 7-year-old Paula Dyer in Knoxville. Irick, then aged 26, had been living with Dyer's family for over a year, and was babysitting five of the family's children (including Paula) on the night of the girl's murder. Irick was the first inmate executed in Tennessee in almost a decade.

== Background ==
Irick was born on August 26, 1958, in Knoxville, Tennessee. He allegedly suffered extensive abuse from his family from a young age, including one incident where a neighbor witnessed Irick's father clubbing him with a piece of lumber. His mental health was reportedly first questioned in March 1965, when he was only six. A psychological evaluation was subsequently performed at the request of his school's principal, owing to his "extreme behavioral problems."

Nina Braswell Lunn, a clinical social worker, performed the subsequent evaluation of Irick when he was in the first grade. Lunn noted that he had shared stories with her about being tied up and beaten at home because his parents could not control him. Lunn later testified that Irick may have been suffering from mild organic brain damage since birth.

Irick was briefly institutionalized before being sent to an orphanage for emotionally disturbed children. During an arranged visit to his parents' home in 1972, Irick (then aged 13) reportedly hit the household's TV set with an axe of some description, destroyed flower beds, and cut up the pajamas his sister was wearing with a razor blade.

== Relationship with the Jeffers family ==
In 1983, while working as a dishwasher at a truck stop in Knoxville, Irick met and befriended Kenny Jeffers, an auto mechanic who lived in nearby Clinton. Jeffers later introduced Irick to Kathy, his wife whom he had married the previous year, and ultimately in 1984 Irick moved in with the couple and five of the eight children between them. (Seven of the children, including Paula Dyer, were the offspring of previous relationships, while the Jeffers' first child together was born in 1983.) Irick frequently babysat the children while the Jeffers parents worked long hours. At the start of April 1985, the family home in Clinton burned down, an ordeal during which Irick saved two of the boys from the burning building. Nobody was severely injured or killed during the fire; however, the family had to live in separate abodes as a result of difficulty in finding a house big enough for all eight of them. Thus, Irick moved to the Western Heights neighborhood with Kenny Jeffers, where they lived with Kenny's parents, while Kathy and the children moved to a small rental home on Exeter Avenue in Knoxville.

== Paula Dyer ==
Paula Kay Dyer (March 5, 1978 – April 16, 1985) was described by her mother as a positive young girl who saw the best in others and was extremely trusting of people. Her mother claimed that, when told she could not randomly try to hold hands with strangers, Paula replied with: "Why, mommy? Jesus loves everybody. Why can't I?"

Paula's kind personality quickly made a positive impression on the neighbors of their new home. Her mother recalled one instance of Paula befriending a next-door neighbor shortly after their arrival at the address, after presenting the neighbor with flowers she had picked from the flower beds at the very front of the house.

=== Dyer's murder ===
On the morning of Monday, April 15, 1985, following an argument, Kathy Jeffers kicked Irick out of the Exeter Avenue home. That night, because the family's regular babysitter was unavailable, Kenny Jeffers dropped Irick off at the same house to babysit the children. When Kathy left for work at 10 pm, the children were asleep, and she felt uncomfortable leaving the children in Irick's care, on account of the argument earlier that day, Irick's behavior, and her suspicions that he had been drinking.

At around midnight, Kenny Jeffers received a call from Irick, telling him to come because Irick was unable "to wake [Paula] up". Upon arriving at the Exeter Avenue address, Kenny found Irick standing in the doorway looking vacant, before finding Paula unconscious on the living room floor in a pool of her own blood. After finding a pulse, Kenny wrapped Paula in a blanket and took her to the nearest children's hospital, where a doctor attempted unsuccessfully for 45 minutes to revive her. The same doctor, Jim Kimball, pronounced Paula dead of asphyxiation in the early hours of April 16, 1985. She was 7 years old.

At autopsy, Paula's cause of death was confirmed to be asphyxiation. In addition, the severe tears in her vagina and rectum were confirmed to be consistent with rape, as well as a head injury sustained during her ordeal being attributed to blunt force trauma that may have knocked her unconscious. As a result of Paula's murder, the Knoxville police department told the public on the morning of April 16 to be on the lookout for a man matching Irick's physical description. By 5 pm, Irick had been found and arrested beneath a bridge on I-275. Paula Dyer was buried on April 19 following a fundraising campaign by the community she had been part of for less than two weeks.

== Legal proceedings and incarceration ==
Police testified that Irick readily confessed to murdering Paula Dyer, both verbally and in writing, and described his behavior as cooperative and remorseful. On April 17, 1985, Irick was arraigned in Dyer's murder, and was appointed two attorneys by a judge after he claimed that he planned to confess and thus did not want a lawyer.

On October 26, 1986, Irick went on trial for killing Dyer. Six days later, on November 1, he was found guilty by a Knox County jury. The defense had launched a failed mental illness claim in an attempt to spare Irick from the death penalty. Irick's mother refused to testify for the defense. On December 3, 1986, that same jury sentenced Irick to death by electrocution, with a tentative execution date of May 4, 1987 (which was stayed). Upon delivery of this verdict, Irick merely smiled and shrugged his shoulders.

== Execution ==
On March 28, 2017, the Tennessee Supreme Court (TNSC) upheld the lethal injection protocols adopted by the Tennessee Department of Correction (TDoC). Thus, on January 18, 2018, the TNSC scheduled Irick's execution for August 9, 2018 — his sixth execution date since arrival on death row. In July 2018, a bench trial was held in Nashville regarding a lawsuit against the TDoC and its execution protocol, filed by over half of the population of Tennessee's death row. On July 26, the chair of the bench, Davidson County Chancellor Ellen Hobbs Lyle, ruled in favor of the TDoC. On August 6, the TNSC refused to grant a stay of Irick's execution to allow an appeal of the ruling. That same day, Tennessee Governor Bill Haslam refused to intervene in Irick's case.

Finally, on August 9, 2018, the day of his scheduled execution, 17 days before his 60th birthday, the United States Supreme Court refused to grant a stay of execution to Irick on the grounds of his mental health. Subsequently, Irick was executed via lethal injection at the Riverbend Maximum Security Institution that day. He was pronounced dead at 7:48 p.m. Those at the scene reported Irick "strained, choked, and thrashed during the procedure".

Irick's execution was the first in Tennessee since Cecil Johnson Jr. was executed on December 2, 2009.

=== Lethal injection controversy ===
In 2022, the execution of Oscar Franklin Smith was called off last minute by Governor Bill Lee due to a "technical oversight" in the lethal injection procedure. Lee suspended executions in Tennessee for the remainder of the year and ordered an independent review of the lethal injection procedure. During the investigation, it was learned that Tennessee had not followed its own policies for carrying out lethal injections since it resumed executions in 2018. Irick, and fellow death row inmate Donnie Johnson, were the only inmates who were executed via lethal injection since the resumption of executions in 2018.

In both Irick and Johnson's executions, it was reported that the execution team prepared two of the three lethal injection drugs too early. A pharmacist testified that doing this could affect a drug's "sterility and potency." A review conducted by The Tennessean which looked over thousands of pages of court records showed that Tennessee and its contractors had regularly deviated from the lethal injection protocol. As such, it was likely that the executions of Irick and Johnson were carried out using expired, compromised, or untested drugs. Not using the correct dosage of the drug results in a substantial amount of pain and suffocation. Because the process uses paralytics, it is difficult for the inmate's pain to be expressed and known, therefore making it hard to define it as "cruel or unusual punishment".

== See also ==
- Capital punishment in Tennessee
- List of people executed in Tennessee
- List of people executed in the United States in 2018

Executions carried out in Tennessee
Preceded by Cecil Johnson Jr. December 2, 2009	William Ray Irick; August 9, 2018	Succeeded by Edmund Zagorski November 1, 2018
Executions carried out in the United States
Preceded by Robert Van Hook – Ohio July 18, 2018	William Ray Irick – Tennessee; August 9, 2018	Succeeded by Carey Dean Moore – Nebraska August 14, 2018
