= Edmund Zagorski =

American executed criminal (1954–2018)

- Zagorski in 1984
- Born: Edmund George Zagorski; December 27, 1954; Michigan, U.S.
- Died: November 1, 2018 (aged 63); Riverbend Maximum Security Institution, Nashville, Tennessee, U.S.
- Cause of death: Execution by electrocution
- Other name: Jesse Lee Hardin
- Conviction: First degree murder (2 counts)
- Penalty: Death (March 27, 1984)

Details
- Victims: John Dale Dotson, 35; James Wayne "Jimmy" Porter, 32
- Date: April 23, 1983
- Country: United States
- Location: Robertson County, Tennessee
- Date apprehended: May 26, 1983

Edmund George Zagorski (December 27, 1954 – November 1, 2018) was an American convicted murderer from Michigan who was executed by the state of Tennessee for the 1983 murders of John Dotson and Jimmy Porter in Robertson County. Zagorski lured the two men into a wooded hunting ground under the pretense of selling them 100 lb (45 kg) of marijuana before shooting them and slitting their throats.

The state of Tennessee made multiple attempts to execute Zagorski over the course of almost a decade. Ultimately, he became the first inmate legally executed by electrocution in almost six years in the United States on November 1, 2018.

== Background ==
Edmund Zagorski was born in Michigan on December 27, 1954, and spent most of his childhood in Tecumseh. He grew up in an impoverished family, suffered from both an unnamed learning disability and a stutter, and did not finish high school. By the time of the murders that put him on death row, he had trained to become a ship captain.

== Murders of Dotson and Porter ==
Zagorski first met John Dale Dotson (1947/48–1983), a logger from Hickman County, Tennessee, on April 5, 1983, at a trout farm. Zagorski introduced himself to Dotson and his wife Marsha under the guise of being a mercenary based in Central America named Jesse Lee Hardin. Zagorski convinced Dotson that he would be able to sell as much as 100 pounds of marijuana for around $25,000 as early as April 21. Following this, the two scheduled a meeting in a wooded hunting ground in Robertson County for 6:00 pm on Saturday, April 23, 1983.

Before he left to meet Zagorski on April 23, Dotson was described by his wife Marsha as "at least somewhat hesitant" and allegedly asked her to call a friend if he failed to return that night. After leaving, he met his friend James "Jimmy" Porter (1950/51–1983) at Porter's tavern, near the arranged meeting location. Dotson had a change of clothes, a backpack and a revolver. The two men promptly left in Porter's truck to meet Zagorski.

At around 5:30 pm, the owner of the trout farm where Zagorski and Dotson first met heard gunshots coming from the area where he knew the three men had arranged to meet. However, little action was taken as gunshots were common in the area due to deer hunting. Almost two weeks later, on May 6, the bodies of Dotson and Porter were found in that same wooded area. The bodies had decomposed quickly, in part due to a burgeoning heat wave; however it was concluded that both men had been shot and their throats had been slit. Ballistics tests matched a bullet casing found at the scene to a gun owned by Zagorski.

== Arrest, interrogation, and trial ==
In late April, days after the murders, Zagorski arrived at a friend's house in Ohio. The friend in question observed that Zagorski was in possession of numerous items belonging to Dotson and Porter, including Porter's red Datsun truck, as well as a large amount of money. Zagorski was ultimately arrested on May 26, 1983, following a shootout with Ohio police, during which he shot a number of officers, before he himself was shot, subdued, and arrested.

Zagorski offered a confession to the murders on July 17, 1983, nearly two months after his arrest, on the condition that he could dictate the terms and date of his execution; a death sentence was mandatory for a capital murder conviction in Tennessee at the time. Despite there being a heat wave in the area, Zagorski was placed in solitary confinement in an unventilated 8 × 8-foot (2.44 × 2.44-m) cell even though a court order forbade it. During the trial, no defense witnesses were called and no evidence was presented by the defense team during the penalty portion of the trial before the jury returned to deliver its verdict.

Zagorski was convicted of murdering Dotson and Porter on March 2, 1984, and on March 27, 1984, he was sentenced to death by electrocution.

== Litigation and execution ==
On February 15, 2018, Tennessee Attorney General Herbert Slatery requested that the Tennessee Supreme Court (TNSC) set execution dates for eight death row inmates, including Zagorski, to take place on or before June 1, 2018. On March 15, the TNSC responded by denying the specific request made by Slatery and by setting execution dates for two of the eight inmates, and Zagorski was scheduled for execution on October 11, 2018, which was at least his third since arrival on death row, while another inmate, David Earl Miller, was scheduled to be executed on December 6. Miller was also executed by electrocution as scheduled.

On October 5, 2018, Tennessee Governor Bill Haslam refused to intervene in Zagorski's case. On October 8, the TNSC also refused to stay Zagorski's execution on the grounds of a challenge to the state's lethal injection protocol.

Mere hours after the TNSC refused to hear Zagorski's case on October 8, 2018, Zagorski requested that he be executed with the state's electric chair, which had last been used over a decade earlier in the September 2007 execution of Daryl Holton. The Tennessee Department of Correction refused the request on October 9, pointing out that Zagorski had waited too long to make such a request and had been asked whether he wanted to reconsider the method of his execution six months in advance. On October 10, the Sixth Circuit Court of Appeals stayed Zagorski's execution on the grounds of ineffective counsel. In addition, on the morning of October 11, Judge Aleta A. Trauger, a judge serving on the United States District Court for the Middle District of Tennessee, stayed Zagorski's execution pending appeals of a ruling in a lawsuit against the Department of Correction regarding the state's lethal injection protocol. Finally, shortly before Zagorski was to be executed, Governor Haslam granted a 10-day executive reprieve (until October 21) with the purpose of allowing the Department of Correction to prepare the electric chair. Both of the stays granted by federal courts were overturned by the United States Supreme Court on October 12.

On October 22, 2018, one day after the reprieve granted by Haslam expired, the TNSC reset Zagorski's execution date to November 1. By October 29, Judge Trauger had rejected all appeals filed to her court by Zagorski's legal team, but granted a restraining order that same day requiring that Zagorski's lawyer, Kelley Henry, would be allowed access to a phone during Zagorski's execution. The state agreed to honour this caveat at around midday on November 1. In addition, a series of appeals were denied by the Sixth Circuit on October 30 and 31. At around 4 pm on November 1, 2018, Zagorski ate a final meal of pickled ham hock and pig tails; he had previously rejected a special last meal ahead of his October 11 execution date. Finally, minutes before 7 pm that same day, the United States Supreme Court refused to grant Zagorski a stay of execution.

Zagorski was executed by electrocution on Thursday, November 1, 2018, at the Riverbend Maximum Security Institution in Nashville, being pronounced dead at 7:26 p.m. CDT (12:26 a.m. UTC). Zagorski was the first inmate legally electrocuted in nearly six years since the January 2013 execution of Robert Gleason in Virginia, the second inmate executed in Tennessee since executions resumed there on August 9, 2018, and, with the electrocution of David Earl Miller on December 6, 2018, the first of two inmates electrocuted in Tennessee in 2018. When asked, his last words were reportedly, "Let’s rock".

== In popular culture ==
The title and cover of the 2019 Black Keys album Let's Rock were inspired by Zagorski's last words before his execution.

== See also ==
- Capital punishment in Tennessee
- List of people executed in Tennessee
- List of people executed in the United States in 2018

Executions carried out in Tennessee
Preceded by William Ray Irick August 9, 2018	Edmund Zagorski; November 1, 2018	Succeeded by David Earl Miller December 6, 2018
Executions carried out in the United States
Preceded by Rodney Berget – South Dakota October 29, 2018	Edmund Zagorski – Tennessee; November 1, 2018	Succeeded by Roberto Ramos – Texas November 14, 2018
