= Riverbend Maximum Security Institution =

Prison in Nashville, Tennessee, United States

- Interactive map of Riverbend Maximum Security Institution
- Location: Nashville, Tennessee; 36°11′22″N 86°54′14″W
- Status: Operational
- Security class: Supermax
- Capacity: 786
- Opened: 1989
- Managed by: Tennessee Department of Correction
- Warden: Kenneth Nelsen

The Riverbend Maximum Security Institution (RMSI) is a prison in Nashville, Tennessee, United States, operated by the Tennessee Department of Correction. The prison opened in 1989 and replaced its 100-year-old neighbor, the Tennessee State Penitentiary. RMSI, which is made up of 20 different buildings, sits on 132 acres (0.53 km^{2}) located off Cockrill Bend Boulevard in Nashville. Riverbend's designated capacity is 786 offenders. Of that number, 480 are classified as high risk.

The prison's overall mission is to ensure the safety of the public, departmental employees and inmates by managing high-risk male offenders. The Warden oversees a staff of nearly 400 people, including administrative workers, correctional officers, unit managers and medical personnel.

Education programs at the prison include GED and Adult Basic Education. There are also vocational classes available for printing, commercial cleaning, industrial maintenance, cabinet making/millwork and computer information systems. TRICOR, the prison industry, also manages a data entry plant and print shop at the prison. Inmates not involved in academic vocation, or industry programs are required to work in support service roles throughout the facility.

Male death row prisoners live at Riverbend. The state's electric chair and lethal injection gurney are located at Riverbend.

== Notable inmates ==
- Cory Lamont Batey – rapist in Vanderbilt rape case, serving 15 years.
- Letalvis Cobbins – convicted of the 2007 murders of Channon Christian and Christopher Newsom
- Michael Lee Cummins – perpetrator of the 2019 Sumner County murders in which he murdered 8 people, including his mother, father, and uncle. A 9th victim, his grandmother, died of her injuries in 2022. Serving 8 life sentences without the possibility of parole
- George Hyatte – convicted of the murder of Tennessee corrections transport officer Wayne "Cotton" Morgan after he pleaded guilty to a robbery charge and his wife, Jennifer Forsyth Hyatte, fatally shot the corrections officer at the Kingston Courthouse in Roane County, Tennessee on August 9, 2005. He was sentenced to life imprisonment without the possibility of parole on March 9, 2009
- Bruce Mendenhall – murderer and suspected serial killer.
- Paul Dennis Reid – serial killer sentenced to death for seven murders during three fast-food restaurant robberies. Reid died on November 1, 2013, due to pneumonia, heart failure, and upper respiratory issues.
- Ezekiel Kelly – perpetrator of the 2022 Memphis shootings.
- Emanuel Kidega Samson – perpetrator of the 2017 Burnette Chapel shooting in which he murdered churchgoer Melanie Crow and injured 7 others, serving a life sentence without parole plus 291 years

=== Death row ===
- Lemaricus Davidson – sentenced to death on October 30, 2009, for the 2007 kidnapping, rape, torture and murders of Channon Christian and Christopher Newsom
- Jessie Dotson – sentenced to death on October 12, 2010, for the 2008 murders of six people. Dotson received six death sentences for the crime
- Henry Eugene Hodges – a convicted serial killer sentenced to death on January 30, 1992, for the 1990 murder of Ronald Allen Bassett.
- Henry Lee Jones – sentenced to death on May 19, 2009, for the 2003 murders of an elderly couple
- Donald Ray Middlebrooks – sentenced to death on September 22, 1989, for the 1987 torture and murder of Kerrick Majors

=== Execution attempted ===
- Christa Pike – murderer; execution botched on September 30, 2026

=== Executed ===
- Robert Glen Coe – child rapist and murderer; executed by lethal injection April 19, 2000
- Sedley Alley – convicted of the 1985 torture, rape, and murder of Suzanne Marie Collins; executed by lethal injection on June 28, 2006
- Philip Workman – murderer; executed by lethal injection on May 9, 2007
- Daryl Holton – child murderer; executed by electrocution on September 12, 2007
- Cecil Johnson Jr. murderer; executed by lethal injection on December 2, 2009
- Billy Ray Irick – child rapist and murderer; executed by lethal injection on August 9, 2018
- Edmund Zagorski – murderer; executed by electrocution on November 1, 2018
- David Earl Miller – convicted of the 1981 murder of Lee Standifer; executed by electrocution on December 6, 2018. Longest-serving death row inmate in Tennessee at the time of his execution
- Stephen Michael West – convicted of the 1986 murders of Wanda and Sheila Romines; executed by electrocution on August 15, 2019
- Leroy Hall Jr. (alias Lee Hall) – convicted of the 1991 murder of Traci Crozier; executed by electrocution on December 5, 2019
- Nicholas Todd Sutton – serial killer; executed by electrocution on February 20, 2020
- Oscar Franklin Smith – murderer; executed by lethal injection on May 22, 2025
- Byron Lewis Black – convicted of the 1988 Clay family murders; executed by lethal injection on August 5, 2025
- Harold Wayne Nichols – convicted of the 1988 rape and murder of Karen Pulley; executed by lethal injection on December 11, 2025
