= Nicholas Todd Sutton =

American serial killer (1961–2020)

- Born: July 15, 1961; Morristown, Tennessee, U.S.
- Died: February 20, 2020 (aged 58); Riverbend Maximum Security Institution, Nashville, Tennessee, U.S.
- Cause of death: Execution by electrocution
- Other name: "Nicky"
- Convictions: Tennessee; First degree murder (2 counts); North Carolina; Second degree murder (2 counts)
- Penalty: Tennessee; Death; North Carolina; Life imprisonment

Details
- Victims: 4
- Span of crimes: 1979–1985
- Country: United States
- States: North Carolina, Tennessee
- Date apprehended: December 25, 1979

Nicholas Todd Sutton (July 15, 1961 – February 20, 2020) was an American serial killer who was responsible for murdering two acquaintances and his own grandmother in North Carolina and Tennessee from August to December 1979. Convicted and sentenced to life imprisonment for these crimes, Sutton, among three others, later participated in a 1985 murder of a fellow inmate over drugs. For this final crime, he was sentenced to death and executed in 2020 by electric chair. Sutton is the most recent person to be executed in this manner.

== Early life ==
Nicholas Todd Sutton was born on July 15, 1961, in Morristown, Tennessee. His mother abandoned him at birth, while his father, a mentally-ill and verbally abusive alcoholic, was constantly detained in either mental institutions or various jails. As he grew up, Sutton was taught to use drugs by his father, leading to a drug addiction that would last up until his incarceration.

When he was still a teenager, Sutton's father died suddenly, leading to him being adopted by his widowed grandmother, Dorothy Virginia Sutton, a schoolteacher living in Lowland. "Nicky", as he was nicknamed, eventually would drop out of school due to frequent fighting with classmates, leaving his grandmother to pay for his living expenses. Despite her good intentions, he often squandered the money on weekly purchases of cocaine and maintaining his pit bulls, and even sold a pickup truck and a land plot in North Carolina which his grandmother had given to him as a gift.

== Discovery of murders ==
On the day of Christmas 1979, Sutton went to the Morristown Police Department to report his grandmother missing. In his statements, he claimed that he had last seen her three days prior in the company of an unknown male. An examination of the family house, however, revealed signs of foul play, most notably blood spots on the carpets, walls and floors. Shortly after, Sutton was detained for questioning, while investigators examined tips in order to locate Mrs. Sutton's body, one of which led them to a property in North Carolina. Upon their return, Sutton said that he had stuffed his grandmother's body in a bag, weighed it down with a cinderblock and then thrown it into the Nolichucky River. After a two-day long search, the 58-year-old's body was found at the bottom of the river, with a forensic autopsy determining that she had been hit in the back of the head with a blunt instrument, but later drowned after being thrown into the river. Sutton was charged with the murder and his bail set at $100,000.

When pressed for a motive, Sutton claimed that while he had disposed of the body, he was not the killer, and what he had done was the result of a panic after finding Dorothy lying on the floor upon returning home. Thinking she was dead, he decided to get rid of the body to avoid being suspected of committing murder. His claims were not taken seriously, and Sutton was subsequently convicted and sentenced to life imprisonment for the murder.

Following his conviction, Sutton changed his story, claiming that the actual killer was 46-year-old Charles Pomery Almon III, a Knoxville contractor who was pressing him for money. Allegedly, Almon broke into the Sutton household and attacked them, killing his grandmother in the process, but Sutton somehow managed to take his gun and shoot him, before dumping both of their bodies in the river. While police and prosecutors alike were skeptical of his version of events, they were convinced that Almon could indeed have been killed, as he had been reported missing for over two months by that point, with his abandoned gold Jaguar found in front of a Holiday Inn in Newport. During the investigations, Sutton confessed to yet another murder: that of his 19-year-old childhood friend, John Michael Large, with whom he shared an apartment in Knoxville. He claimed that sometime from August 10 to 22, he had set up a meeting with Large at his aunt's remote farm in Waterville, North Carolina, where he kept a stash of marijuana and white liquor. At that time, the two friends had been involved in a bitter argument over money, as Large supposedly had to use $25,000 to buy cocaine from Ohio, but never got around to doing so. Sutton claimed that after arriving at the farm's barn on his motorcycle, Large suddenly opened fire on him, before the pair got into a fight. In the ensuing scuffle, he then said that he hit him with a tobacco stick, before grabbing a nearby dog chain, with which he beat and choked Large. While he was still recovering from the beatings, Sutton then grabbed the tobacco stick and rammed it down Large's throat, killing him instantly. He then dragged the body to a slope near Mount Sterling, where he buried it in a shallow grave among sumac groves.

With Sutton's directions, police quickly located Large's burial site, exhumed the body and sent it to Chapel Hill for an autopsy. The coroner determined that the cause of death was blunt force trauma to the head, and an object found in Large's mouth was a piece of plywood, not a piece of a tobacco stick. Nevertheless, a murder warrant was issued from the state of North Carolina for Sutton, as the killing had occurred in their jurisdiction. When it came to the Almon case, authorities were unable to find his body in the river, leading them to believe that Sutton had buried him somewhere else. With these doubts arising, Sutton changed his story yet again, claiming that Almon and an unidentified accomplice had robbed a bank in the Asheville area, and that they gave him $1,500 in exchange for acting as their getaway driver.

== Investigation, trial and conviction ==
On April 29, 1980, Sutton was arraigned for Large's murder in North Carolina, while authorities back in Tennessee continued to search for Almon's body. On May 14, scuba divers investigating an old rock quarry near Newport uncovered the remains of at least four bodies, one of which was thought to belong to Almon. Like his other victims, it bore what the investigators had termed "Sutton's signature" - it was wrapped up in bags, weighed with cinderblocks and sunk at the bottom of the quarry. The other bodies were determined to be unrelated to the case. Upon hearing of the discovery, Sutton spontaneously confessed to two additional victims: an Alcoa teenager he had apparently killed in July 1978 and buried in North Carolina, and a supposed drug buyer from Atlanta he had also buried on the family farm. As a result of these confessions, the search at the quarry was temporarily called off.

Not long after, police in both North Carolina and Tennessee obtained search warrants to locate the new alleged victims, whose identities Sutton never disclosed. In an effort to locate them, prosecutors offered a plea deal with the convict, sparing him a death sentence in exchange for him revealing the burial site locations. After numerous failed searches, it was deduced that the "undiscovered victims" were made up by Sutton. In June 1980, he was additionally charged with Almon's murder.

To avoid a possible death sentence, Sutton pleaded guilty to both murder charges, subsequently receiving two more life imprisonment terms. At his sentencing, Sutton claimed that he had committed the killings in a fit of anger and was reckless, willingly accepting his sentence.

== Prison murder ==
After his conviction, Sutton initially served his sentence at the Brushy Mountain State Penitentiary before being transferred to the maximum security Morgan County Correctional Complex in Wartburg. While in prison, he continued using and dealing drugs to fellow inmates, one of whom was 44-year-old Carl Isaac Estep, who was serving a life sentence for raping his 9-year-old stepdaughter in Knoxville. Estep's daughter later described the day of his murder as the best day of her life. She described her stepfather as an "evil man" and accused him of setting their house on fire and deliberately causing a traffic accident that killed her baby sister.

In early January 1985, the two got into a dispute over drugs, with Estep threatening to kill Sutton using a homemade knife. In response, Sutton and three other inmates (23-year-old Charles Arnold Freeman; 33-year-old Thomas Street and 22-year-old David Wesley Stufflestreet) decided to arm themselves with knives and take revenge on Estep. On January 15, the quartet went to Estep's cell and stabbed him 38 times. None were charged until May 20, with Sutton, Freeman and Street being charged with first-degree murder while Stufflestreet was charged as an accessory. In March 1986, the jury found Sutton and Street guilty on the murder charge, sentencing the former to death and the latter to life imprisonment; Freeman and Stufflestreet were each acquitted.

== Appeals and execution ==
In the decades following his death sentence conviction, Sutton and his lawyers launched repeated appeals to various courts, arguing that his troubled personal life and good behavior after the incident were mitigating factors. These claims were backed up by several correctional officials at the Riverbend Maximum Security Institution, who said that Sutton was a Christian convert and model inmate who cared for the sick inmates on death row, and had even saved guards' lives during prison riots. Reportedly, five of the jurors who had originally given him the death sentence now supported his bid for commutation, as well as several of his victims' relatives. This sentiment was not shared by the sister of John Large, Amy Large Cook, who said that he deserved to die and she would visit the prison on the day of his execution. Likewise, his uncle Thomas Davis said in an interview that he had broken all contact with him, and that Sutton was "[...] totally somebody who shouldn't even be part of society."

In January 2020, Sutton notified prison officials that he chose the electric chair over lethal injection as execution method, a choice allowed by Tennessee law.

In the end, Sutton's death sentence was confirmed, as Governor Bill Lee rejected his clemency application a week before the scheduled execution date. This was soon followed by a refusal from the Supreme Court to issue a stay of execution. On February 20, 2020, Sutton was executed via electric chair at the Riverbend Maximum Security Institution. In his final statement, Sutton spoke at length about his faith, love and gratefulness to his family, friends and Jesus Christ. After having his spiritual adviser serve communion, consisting of Welch's grape juice and a wafer, Sutton ate his requested last meal of fried pork chops, mashed potatoes with gravy and peach pie with vanilla ice cream. His last words were "I'm just grateful to be a servant of God." Sutton is the most recent person to be executed by electric chair in the United States, as of 2026.

== See also ==
- Capital punishment in Tennessee
- List of people executed in Tennessee
- List of people executed in the United States in 2020
- List of serial killers in the United States
- List of people executed by electrocution

Executions carried out in Tennessee
Preceded by Leroy Hall Jr. December 5, 2019	Nicholas Todd Sutton; February 20, 2020	Succeeded by Oscar Franklin Smith May 22, 2025
Executions carried out in the United States
Preceded by Abel Revilla Ochoa – Texas February 6, 2020	Nicholas Todd Sutton – Tennessee; February 20, 2020	Succeeded by Nathaniel Woods – Alabama March 5, 2020
