= Capital punishment in Tennessee =

Capital punishment is a legal punishment in the US state of Tennessee.

== Legal process ==
The death penalty (when sought by the prosecution) requires the unanimous support of the jury. If even a single juror opposes the death penalty, the jury is hung and the convicted person will be sentenced to prison. There will not be a retrial.

Since 2000, state law specifies lethal injection as the primary method. The state has a protocol for how to carry it out.

The alternative method is electrocution. According to state law:

- If the Department of Correction were unable to carry out lethal injection (e.g., the drugs were unavailable), the person would be electrocuted.
- A person condemned before January 1, 1999 can choose electrocution. (As of 2026, over half the people on death row were condemned before 1999.)
- If lethal injection were found to be unconstitutional (overall or in a specific case), the state would turn to electrocution; were electrocution also to be found unconstitutional, the state would find another method.

In 1999, state officials said that when an inmate elected lethal injection for their execution, prison workers would remove the electric chair from the death chamber several days prior to avoid occluding witnesses' view of the execution gurney. Conversely, the state also removes the lethal injection gurney from the death chamber when an inmate elects to die by electrocution.

== Capital crimes ==
First degree-murder can be punished by death when it involves any of the following aggravating factors:

1. The murder was committed against a person less than 12 years of age;
2. The defendant was previously convicted of one or more felonies, other than the present charge, whose statutory elements involve the use of violence to the person;
3. The defendant knowingly created a great risk of death to two or more persons, other than the victim murdered, during the act of murder;
4. The defendant committed the murder for remuneration or the promise of remuneration, or employed another to commit the murder for remuneration or the promise of remuneration;
5. The murder was especially heinous, atrocious, or cruel, in that it involved torture or serious physical abuse beyond that necessary to produce death;
6. The murder was committed for the purpose of avoiding, interfering with, or preventing a lawful arrest or prosecution of the defendant or another;
7. The murder was knowingly committed, solicited, directed, or aided by the defendant, while the defendant had a substantial role in committing or attempting to commit, or was fleeing after having a substantial role in committing or attempting to commit, any first degree murder, arson, rape, robbery, burglary, theft, kidnapping, aggravated child abuse, aggravated child neglect, rape of a child, aggravated rape of a child, aircraft piracy, or unlawful throwing, placing or discharging of a destructive device or bomb;
8. The murder was committed by the defendant while the defendant was in lawful custody or in a place of lawful confinement or during the defendant's escape from lawful custody or from a place of lawful confinement;
9. The murder was committed against any law enforcement officer, corrections official, corrections employee, probation and parole officer, emergency medical or rescue worker, emergency medical technician, paramedic or firefighter, who was engaged in the performance of official duties, and the defendant knew or reasonably should have known that the victim was a law enforcement officer, corrections official, corrections employee, probation and parole officer, emergency medical or rescue worker, emergency medical technician, paramedic or firefighter engaged in the performance of official duties;
10. The murder was committed against any present or former judge, district attorney general or state attorney general, assistant district attorney general or assistant state attorney general, due to or because of the exercise of the victim's official duty or status and the defendant knew that the victim occupied such office;
11. The murder was committed against a national, state, or local popularly elected official, due to or because of the official's lawful duties or status, and the defendant knew that the victim was such an official;
12. The defendant committed "mass murder" which is defined as the murder of three or more persons, whether committed during a single criminal episode or at different times within a forty-eight-month period;
13. The defendant knowingly mutilated the body of the victim after death;
14. The victim of the murder was 70 years of age or older; or the victim of the murder was particularly vulnerable due to a significant handicap or significant disability, whether mental or physical, and at the time of the murder the defendant knew or reasonably should have known of such handicap or disability;
15. The murder was committed in the course of an act of terrorism; or
16. The murder was committed against a pregnant woman, and the defendant intentionally killed the victim, knowing that she was pregnant.

== Current status ==
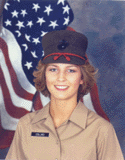
Suzanne Marie Collins

Between reinstating the death penalty in 2000 and pausing it in 2020, Tennessee carried out fourteen executions: one in 2000 under governor Don Sundquist, five from 2006 to 2009 under governor Phil Bredesen, three during the final months of Bill Haslam's second term, including Edmund Zagorski, and six under Bill Lee. Executions were paused in 2020 due to the COVID-19 pandemic, and Lee further paused new death warrants due to systemic issues with the application of the state's execution protocol. Executions resumed in 2025.

The first execution during Bredesen's governorship was that of Sedley Alley, sentenced to death for the rape, torture and murder of 19-year old U.S. Marine Corps Lance Corporal Suzanne Marie Collins. Her parents were notable advocates of expediting the death penalty appeal process. Another condemned inmate, Steven Ray Thacker, was sentenced to death for a tow truck driver's murder in Tennessee, but he was ultimately executed in Oklahoma for a separate rape-murder in that state.

As of August 2026, 41 condemned prisoners are incarcerated on the state's death row. The Tennessee Supreme Court sets execution dates. The Governor alone decides whether to grant or deny clemency; the Tennessee Board of Probation and Parole makes a recommendation in each case but the Governor is not required to follow the Board's recommendation. Executions take place at the Riverbend Maximum Security Institution in Nashville at 10:00 am (the time was 1:00 am until 2009, 10:00 am from 2009–2018, and 7:00 pm from 2018–2025).

In 2007, Tennessee established by legislation a Committee to Study the Administration of the Death Penalty. After 16 months of analysis and hearings, the study committee on the death penalty suggested reform of the death penalty without abolishing it, including the creation of an independent authority to review death sentences.

Of the two women sentenced to death:

- Gaile Owens had her sentence commuted to life imprisonment with the possibility of parole by Governor Phil Bredesen in July 2010, owing to a sentence deemed "disproportionate" (she was convicted in 1986 for having killed her husband who beat her).
- Christa Pike, convicted in 1996 of first degree murder of a fellow Job Corps dormitory resident, survived the state's attempt to execute her on September 30, 2026. Governor Bill Lee said there would be no further attempts to execute anyone for the rest of the year.

In the history of Tennessee's modern death penalty, in addition to Gaile Owens, only Michael Joe Boyd and Jerome Harbison had their sentences commuted. Governor Phil Bredesen gave Boyd and Harbison life imprisonment without the possibility of parole; no other Tennessee governor had commuted any death sentences in the modern death penalty era.

In 2024, Tennessee saw moves to allow the death penalty for defendants convicted of child rape. It passed the Tennessee House of Representatives with a 77-19-1 vote, and it passed the Tennessee Senate with 24-5. Governor Bill Lee signed the bill into law on May 9, 2024, and it went into effect on July 1, 2024. This law could ultimately challenge the precedent of the Supreme Court decision Kennedy v. Louisiana (2008), which prohibits the death penalty in all cases except murder.

In March 2025, Tennessee scheduled the 2025 execution dates of four murderers: Oscar Franklin Smith (May 22, 2025), Byron Lewis Black (August 5, 2025), Donald Ray Middlebrooks (September 24, 2025) and Harold Wayne Nichols (December 11, 2025). Smith, Black, and Nichols were executed as scheduled, thus ending the five-year pause on executions.

Eight of the 276 botched executions from 1890 to 2010 occurred in Tennessee. Two more occurred in 2026.

On October 1, 2026, the day after the state's botched lethal injection of Christa Pike, U.S. Sen. Marsha Blackburn, then running for governor, expressed her support for the state again utilizing the electric chair.

== Early history ==
In 1820, Eve Martin became the last woman to be executed in Tennessee. (As of September 2026, the state has executed no women after her.) Martin was hanged after being convicted of being an accomplice to murder.

In Tennessee, hanging was the legal method of execution until 1913, when executions were suspended for two years. In 1915, the electric chair was introduced and used as the state's exclusive method of execution until 1960.

In 1916, Mary the circus elephant was executed in Tennessee for killing one of her trainers. The first attempt of execution was botched and unsuccessful because the rope meant to hang her broke. The second attempt was successful.

The more common nickname for the electric chair was "Old Sparky" though on occasions the name "Old Smokey" was used instead. Circa 1989 a new electric chair was developed, using wood from the old electric chair, which in turn came from former hanging gallows. The new chair had holes to allow for drainage of any liquids generated by a prisoner.

The last time Tennessee executed someone who had been convicted as a juvenile was on August 11, 1947, when the state sent Fred Jackson to the electric chair. Having been born June 2, 1929, Jackson was 16 at the time of his crimes (the January 1946 murders of 3-year-old Freddie Goss and 16-month-old Sammie Goss), 16 at the time of his conviction in March 1946, and 18 at the time of his execution.

After the 1960 execution of William James Tines, Tennessee did not execute anyone for another 40 years. The death penalty was reinstated in 1977, but Tennessee did not immediately resume carrying out executions. In 1982, Tennessee banned the death penalty for juvenile offenders. In 1990, the state legislature also banned the death penalty for the intellectually disabled.

When Tennessee resumed executions in 2000, the method was lethal injection, although those sentenced to death before January 1, 1999 could request the electric chair. State law was amended in 2014 to reinstate electrocution as a backup method given that the state was encountering practical difficulties obtaining the drugs.

Tennessee's death row and death chamber are currently housed at the Riverbend Maximum Security Institution in Nashville, and all executions take place there now. Prior, after the adoption of the electric chair in 1913, Tennessee's death chamber was at the Tennessee State Prison, also in Nashville, about two miles from Riverbend. In 1989, state officials relocated Tennessee's death row, death chamber, and electric chair from the original prison to Riverbend. While both death row and the execution chamber are at Riverbend, officials house both in separate buildings to keep the execution equipment from affecting other death row inmates' morale, as well as the morale of staff.

== See also ==
- List of people executed in Tennessee (pre-1972)
- List of death row inmates in the United States § Tennessee
- Crime in Tennessee
