= List of last meals =

Meal preceding one's death penalty

This is a list of documented last meals by death row prisoners before their executions. This represents the items requested, as reported, but does not in all cases represent what the prisoner actually received.

== Europe ==
=== Germany ===
Name	Crime	Year	Method of execution	Requested meal
Susanna Margaretha Brandt	Murder	1772	Decapitation by sword	A glass of water. Brandt was previously offered a feast consisting of three pounds of bratwurst, ten pounds of beef, six pounds of baked carp, twelve pounds of lamb roast, soup, cabbage, bread, an unspecified dessert and eight litres of wine. She rejected the meal; it was instead eaten by officials.
Karl Ludwig Sand	Murder	1820	Decapitation by sword	Gruel.
Fritz Haarmann	Serial murder	1925	Decapitation by guillotine	An expensive cigar and a cup of Brazilian coffee.
Karl Hopf	Serial murder	1914	Decapitation by guillotine	Sausages, bread and beer.
Mathias Kneißl	Murder and robbery	1902	Decapitation by guillotine	Six glasses of beer.
Peter Kürten	Serial murder and rape	1931	Decapitation by guillotine	Wiener schnitzel, fried potatoes and a bottle of white wine. He requested a second helping and received it.
Adolf Seefeldt	Serial murder	1936	Decapitation by guillotine	A roast chicken.
Friedrich Schumann	Serial murder	1921	Decapitation by axe	Frikadellen and Teltow turnips.
Ten leaders of Nazi Germany	Each convicted of one or more of: participation or conspiring to participate in a crime against peace; planning, initiating and waging wars of aggression; participating in war crimes, and crimes against humanity.	1946	Hanging	Sausage and cold cuts; potato salad, black bread and tea.

=== Others ===
Name	Crime	Country	Year	Method of execution	Requested meal
Charles Peace	Serial murder	UK	1879	Hanging	Eggs and a large amount of salty bacon. He asked for a cup of iced water, but it was denied.
Roger Casement	Treason, (enlisting help from the German Empire for the Easter Rising)	UK	1916	Hanging	Sacramental bread. Casement converted to Catholicism before his execution and stated he intended to go "to my death with the body of my God as my last meal."
Ruth Ellis	Murder	UK	1955	Hanging	Scrambled egg.
Louis XVI	High treason	France	1793	Decapitation by guillotine	A pan-fried chicken, some pastries, boiled beef and puréed turnips. He additionally received a dessert consisting of two chicken wings, vegetables, two glasses of wine cut with water, a piece of sponge cake, and a glass of Malaga wine.
Véronique Frantz	Serial murder	France	1854	Decapitation by guillotine	Café au lait and a bread roll.
Ion Pistol	Murder	Socialist Republic of Romania	1987	Shooting	An onion omelette.

== Asia ==
=== Indonesia ===
Name	Crime	Year	Method of execution	Requested meal
D. N. Aidit	30 September Movement	1965	Firing squad (extrajudicial killing by army)	Bentoel cigarettes unsympathetically given by an army colonel upon request.
Amrozi and Huda bin Abdul Haq	Terrorism; involved in the 2002 Bali bombings	2008	Firing squad	Roti canai and chips made from Indian three-leaved yam. The two were brothers and shared the same last meal, which was provided by their family.
Freddy Budiman	Possession of narcotic drugs	2016	Firing squad	Homemade meals made by his former mother-in-law: Otak-otak fish cakes, and rendang.
Andrew Chan and Myuran Sukumaran	Australian ringleaders of the Bali Nine	2015	Firing squad	KFC. Although Indonesia does not normally grant last meal requests, Sukumaran and Chan were granted their KFC feast via officials.
Sekarmadji Maridjan Kartosuwiryo	Rebellion, waging war against Indonesia	1962	Firing squad	Rendang and rice. He shared the meal with his wife and children, but he personally did not eat it.
Imam Samudra	Terrorism; involved in the 2002 Bali bombings	2008	Firing squad	Emping mlinjo, sagon (Javanese coconut cookies), and pepes made from mackerel.
Astini Sumiasih	Murder	2005	Firing squad	Bread, calamari, and assorted fruits.

=== Others ===
Name	Crime	Country/Territory	Year	Method of execution	Requested meal
Cheng Chieh	Mass murder; involved in the 2014 Taipei Metro attack	Taiwan	2016	Gunshot	Bento, consisting of stewed pork, rice and vegetables.
Johannes van Damme	Drug trafficking	Singapore	1994	Hanging	Roast chicken with salad and Coca-Cola on ice, fried eggs and sausages, and a meal of specially-made pea soup with sausages from the Dutch Embassy.
Leo Echegaray	Rape of his 10-year-old stepdaughter	Philippines	1999	Lethal injection	Sardines and dried fish. When the reprieve was announced, he shared the food with relatives who had gathered at the prison.
Adolf Eichmann	Holocaust perpetrator	Israel	1962	Hanging	Declined a special meal, instead requesting a bottle of Carmel red wine with the usual prison food of cheese, bread, olives, and tea. He drank about half of the bottle.
Mona Fandey	Murder	Malaysia	2001	Hanging	Declined a last meal; she was instead given a dinner from KFC.
Saddam Hussein	Crimes against humanity	Iraq	2006	Hanging	The Times states that "he refused their offers of cigarettes and a last meal of chicken." Other sources state Hussein ate his last meal of chicken and rice, and had a cup of hot water with honey. Regardless of the source, whatever Hussein actually had for his last meal is unknown.
Ajmal Kasab	Terrorism; involved in the 2008 Mumbai attacks	India	2012	Hanging	A tomato along with "jail food", and two cups of masala tea. He also drank four bottles of mineral water.
Theerasak Longji	Murder	Thailand	2018	Lethal injection	Sticky rice with grilled chicken.
Yakub Memon	Terrorism; involved in the 1993 Bombay bombings	India	2015	Hanging	Declined a special meal; he was given a breakfast of upma, which he did not eat.
Somsak Pornnarai	Murder and rape	Thailand	1999	Shooting	Plain rice, tofu soup with minced pork, khanom mo kaeng and a bottle of water.
Jaime Gómez José, Edgardo Payumo Aquino and Basílio Pineda, Jr.	Abduction, raped and assaulted Maggie de la Riva	Philippines	1972	Electric chair	Rice, kare-kare, chicken tinola, lobster, crispy pata, lechon, fried lapu lapu, and ice cream.
John Martin Scripps	Murder spree	Singapore	1996	Hanging	A pizza and a cup of hot chocolate.
Jimmy Chua Chap Seng	Unlawful possession of firearms	Malaysia	1989	Hanging	Meat and seafood.
Tangaraju Suppiah	Drug trafficking	Singapore	2023	Hanging	Chicken rice, nasi biryani, ice cream soda, and Milo-flavoured sweets, and a bowl of wonton noodles.
Hideki Tojo	Japanese war crimes	Japan	1948	Hanging	Rice, miso soup, and grilled fish.

== Canada ==
Name	Crime	Province	Year	Method of execution	Requested meal
Arthur Lucas and Ronald Turpin	Murder	Ontario	1962	Hanging	Steak, potatoes, vegetables and pie.

== United States ==
=== Alabama ===
Name	Crime	Year	Method of execution	Requested meal
James Cobern	Robbery	1964	Electrocution	Fried chicken, French fried potatoes, rolls, milk, coffee and coconut cream pie.
Derrick Ryan Dearman	Mass murder	2024	Lethal injection	A seafood platter brought to the prison from a local restaurant, consisting of "fried catfish, three fried shrimp, three boiled shrimp, three fried oysters, three onion rings, a deviled crab and two sides".
John Louis Evans	Murder	1983	Electrocution	A shrimp dinner.
Demetrius Terrence Frazier	Murder	2025	Nitrogen hypoxia	A beefy five-layer burrito, a chicken chalupa supreme, beef crunchy tacos, chips and dip, and a Mountain Dew, all ordered from Taco Bell.
Keith Edmund Gavin	Murder	2024	Lethal injection	Declined a last meal, but he accepted a snack of ice cream and Mountain Dew from the prison vending machines.
Carey Dale Grayson	Murder	2024	Nitrogen hypoxia	Soft tacos, beef burritos, a tostada, chips and guacamole, and a Mountain Dew Baja Blast, all of which were ordered from local restaurants.
James Barney Hubbard	Murder	2004	Lethal injection	Two fried eggs over-medium, four slices of bacon, sliced tomatoes, fried green tomatoes, pineapple slices with mayonnaise, white bread, a banana and a medium-sized bottle of V8 juice.
Andrew Reid Lackey	Murder	2013	Lethal injection	Grilled cheese sandwich, turkey bologna and french fries.
Rhonda Belle Martin	Serial murder	1957	Electrocution	A hamburger, mashed potatoes, cinnamon rolls and coffee.
Alan Eugene Miller	Mass murder	2024	Nitrogen hypoxia	A hamburger steak, a baked potato and French fries. During his previous failed execution, Miller had meatloaf, chuckwagon steak, American cheese, French fries, apple sauce, mashed potatoes, macaroni, apples and an orange drink.
Jamie Ray Mills	Murder	2024	Lethal injection	A seafood platter with three large shrimp, two catfish filets, three oysters, a stuffed crab and onion rings.
Walter Moody	Murder	2018	Lethal injection	Declined a special meal, but shared two Philly cheesesteak sandwiches, a bag of chips, two bottles of Dr Pepper, one bag of M&M's and a Hershey bar with almonds with two attorneys and three friends before the execution.
John Forrest Parker	Murder	2010	Lethal injection	Fish and chips and iced tea.
Domineque Ray	Murder and rape	2019	Lethal injection	Declined a special meal, but had the regular breakfast meal for that day consisting of eggs, potatoes, two biscuits, jelly, prunes and milk.
Matthew Reeves	Murder	2022	Lethal injection	Declined a special meal, but asked for a bottle of Sprite before his execution.
Kenneth Eugene Smith	Murder	2024	Nitrogen hypoxia	A T-bone steak, eggs, hash browns, and toast slathered in A.1. Sauce. Although Alabama typically provides last meals the afternoon of the execution, Smith's last meal was served at 10 a.m., and he was not permitted to drink any liquids after 4 p.m., two hours before his execution was scheduled to begin. This was done as a precaution to minimize the chance that Smith would vomit into his mask as the gas was being pumped in. During his previous failed execution, Smith ate catfish fillets, baked potato, and cole slaw.
Jack Harrison Trawick	Serial murder	2009	Lethal injection	Fried chicken, French fries, onion soup and a roll.
Billy Wayne Waldrop	Serial murder	1997	Electric chair	Steak with fried onions, baked potato, salad and chocolate cake.
Thomas Warren Whisenhant	Serial murder	2010	Lethal injection	Chicken leg quarters, french fries, American cheese, orange drink, coffee and chocolate pudding.
Nathaniel Woods	Murder	2020	Lethal injection	Chicken patty, chicken leg quarter, spinach, sweet potatoes, French fries, cooked apples, two oranges and orange flavored drink.
Jeremy Tremaine Williams	Rape-Murder	2026	Lethal injection	Cheese pizza

=== Arizona ===
Name	Crime	Year	Method of execution	Requested meal
Frank Jarvis Atwood	Murder and kidnapping	2022	Lethal injection	Declined a last meal, saying that he was fasting, then changed his mind and accepted a meal tray consisting of salami, slices of white and wheat bread, a snack bag of tortilla chips, mustard, peanut butter, jelly and water with a juice packet.
Donald Edward Beaty	Murder	2011	Lethal injection	French fries, one double cheeseburger, a shredded beef chimichanga and rocky road ice cream.
Richard Lynn Bible	Murder	2011	Lethal injection	Fried eggs with melted cheese, gravy with sausage, hash brown potatoes, biscuits, grape jelly, peanut butter and chocolate milk.
Daren Lee Bolton	Murder	1996	Lethal injection	Lasagna, cheesecake and Pepsi.
Clarence Wayne Dixon	Murder	2022	Lethal injection	Kentucky Fried Chicken, strawberry ice cream and a bottle of water.
Richard Kenneth Djerf	Mass murder	2025	Lethal injection	Double cheeseburger with lettuce and tomato, onion rings with ketchup, a piece of cherry pie with whipped cream and a Pepsi.
Randy Greenawalt	Mass murder	1997	Lethal injection	Two cheeseburgers, french fries with extra salt, coffee with milk.
Douglas Edward Gretzler	Serial murder	1998	Lethal injection	Six fried eggs (over easy), four strips of bacon (chewy), two slices of buttered toast, one cup of coffee, and two bottles of Coca-Cola (served with ice).
Aaron Brian Gunches	Murder	2025	Lethal injection	Carl's Jr. Double Bacon Western Cheeseburger, french fries, onion rings, baklava, and Coca-Cola.
Donald Eugene Harding	Murder	1992	Gas chamber	Fried eggs, bacon, toast, butter, honey and orange juice.
Murray Hooper	Double murder	2022	Lethal injection	Fried KFC chicken (white meat) extra crispy; Macaroni with Cheese; Cheesecake; Two pints of Neapolitan ice cream; One large Fanta orange soda; One dinner roll; Bar-b-que sauce packets.
Robert Glen Jones Jr.	Murder	2013	Lethal injection	Jones declined to have a special last meal, but he accepted the regular meal set from the daily prison menu, which consisted of hamburger patties, mashed potatoes, gravy, carrots, two slices of wheat bread, glazed cake and a powdered-juice drink.
Karl-Heinz LaGrand	Murder	1999	Lethal injection	Two BLT sandwiches on white bread with mayonnaise, four fried eggs (over easy), a medium portion of hash browns, two breakfast rolls with strawberry jelly, half a pint of pineapple sherbet, a cup of coffee, a medium slice of German chocolate cake and a cup of milk.
Walter Bernhard LaGrand	Murder	1999	Gas chamber	Six fried eggs (over easy), 16 strips of bacon, a breakfast steak (well-done), a large serving of hash browns, a pint of pineapple sherbet, a can each of Coca-Cola, 7 Up and Dr Pepper, a cup of coffee, a cup of ice, hot sauce, two packs of sugar and four Rolaids.
Jeffrey Timothy Landrigan	Murder	2010	Lethal injection	Steak, french fries, fried okra, strawberry shake and Dr Pepper.
Leroy McGill	Murder	2026	Lethal injection	Onion rings, bread and butter, chocolate cake and a green salad.
Michael Kent Poland	Murder	1999	Lethal injection	Three fried eggs, sunny side up; four slices of bacon; hash brown potatoes; two slices of whole wheat toast, with two pats of butter; two individual serving size boxes of Raisin Bran cereal; two cartons of milk; two cups of Tasters Choice coffee.
Richard Dale Stokley	Double murder	2012	Lethal injection	One Porterhouse steak, french fries, okra, cauliflower, salad with blue cheese dressing, cheddar cheese, fruit (one banana, one apple, one peach), cream soda and chocolate ice cream.
Joseph Rudolph Wood III	Murder	2014	Lethal injection	Two cookies.

=== Arkansas ===
Name	Crime	Year	Method of execution	Requested meal
James Waybern Hall	Serial murder	1946	Electrocution	Steak, pork chops and strawberry ice cream.
Jack Harold Jones Jr.	Serial murder	2017	Lethal injection	Fried chicken, fried potato logs with tartar sauce, beef jerky bites, three candy bars, a chocolate milkshake and fruit punch.
Ledell Lee	Murdered his neighbor	2017	Lethal injection	Holy Communion.
Eric Randall Nance	Murder	2005	Lethal injection	Two bacon cheeseburgers, french fries, two pints of chocolate chip cookie dough ice cream, and two bottles of Coca-Cola.
Marion Albert Pruett	Murder spree	1999	Lethal injection	A stuffed crust pizza from Pizza Hut, four Burger King Whoppers, a large order of french fries, fried okra, fried eggplant, fried squash, a pecan pie, three two-liter bottles of Pepsi, a bucket of ice, a bottle of ketchup and salt. In an interview prior to his execution date, he said he was going to share his last meal with another inmate who was going to be executed the same day. He went on to say he originally planned to request roast duck for his last meal, but he felt the prison would likely not prepare it.
Ricky Ray Rector	Murder	1992	Lethal injection	Steak, fried chicken, cherry Kool-Aid, and a pecan pie. Rector, rendered mentally incapacitated by his suicide attempt after murdering a police officer, said that he did not eat the pie because he was "saving it for later".
Christina Marie Riggs	Murder	2000	Lethal injection	Supreme pizza, salad, fried okra, cherry limeade and strawberry shortcake.
Paul Ruiz	Capital murder	1997	Lethal injection	Caesar salad.
Kenneth Dewayne Williams	Serial murder	2017	Lethal injection	Two pieces of fried chicken with a side of sweet rice, BBQ pinto beans, a slice of bread, a peanut butter cookie, and a cinnamon roll.
Marcel Wayne Williams	Murder	2017	Lethal injection	Three fried chicken breasts, fried potato wedges and ketchup, nacho chips with chili and cheese sauce, jalapeños, ice cream, banana pudding, and two Mountain Dews.
Elijah Green Wood	Murder	1913	Hanging	Chicken, ice cream, cake, cantaloupe and a bottle of beer.

=== California ===
Name	Crime	Year	Method of execution	Requested meal
Burton Abbott	Murder and rape	1957	Gas chamber	French fried butterfly jumbo prawns with cocktail sauce, Ravioli, tossed green salad (mainly composed of romaine lettuce) with vinegar-and-oil dressing, chocolate cake, and a pack of Salem cigarettes.
Clarence Ray Allen	Proxy murder (Note: This is the last execution in California, 20 years ago.)	2006	Lethal injection	Buffalo steak, frybread, Kentucky Fried Chicken, sugar-free pecan pie, sugar-free black walnut ice cream, and whole milk. He let the ice-cream thaw out for an hour and turned it into a milkshake by hand.
Stephen Wayne Anderson	Murder	2002	Lethal injection	Two grilled cheese sandwiches, one pint of cottage cheese, a hominy-corn mixture, radishes, one slice of peach pie and one pint of chocolate chip ice cream.
Donald Jay Beardslee	Murder	2005	Lethal injection	Refused a special meal and had regular prison fare of chili macaroni, bread, salad and cake.
William Bonin	Serial murder and rape	1996	Lethal injection	Two pepperoni and sausage pizzas, three servings of chocolate ice cream, and three six-packs of Coca-Cola and Pepsi.
Caryl Chessman	Kidnapping, rape and robbery	1960	Gas chamber	A ham and cheese sandwich and bottle of Coca-Cola.
Billy Cook	Murder	1952	Gas chamber	Fried chicken, french fried potatoes, peas, pumpkin pie, coffee and milk.
Elizabeth Ann Duncan	Proxy murder	1962	Gas chamber	A steak and a salad.
Theodore Durrant	Murder	1898	Hanging	Roast beef, fruit salad and tea.
Barbara Graham	Murder	1955	Gas chamber	A milkshake and a chocolate sundae.
Robert Alton Harris	Murder	1992	Gas chamber	A 21-piece bucket of Kentucky Fried Chicken, two large pizzas, ice cream, a bag of jelly beans, a six-pack of Pepsi, and a pack of Camel cigarettes. Though Domino's Pizza was requested, Tombstone pizza was served, per Vernell Crittendon's orders. Crittendon worked at the prison and was responsible for dealing with the condemned person before his execution.
William Edward Hickman	Murder	1928	Hanging	Ham and eggs, grapefruit, potatoes and a waffle.
David Mason	Murder	1993	Gas chamber	Declined a special meal, but chose to have some ice water while waiting in his cell.
Robert Lee Massie	Murder	2001	Lethal injection	Fried oysters, French fries, two vanilla milkshakes and soft drinks.
Aaron Mitchell	Murder	1967	Gas chamber	Fried chicken, bread and butter, and milk.
Stephen A. Nash	Serial murder	1959	Gas chamber	Ham sandwiches, hamburgers, pie and steak, and a gallon of milk.
Gordon Stewart Northcott	Serial murder	1930	Hanging	Ham and eggs, hot biscuits, hotcakes with syrup, mush and coffee.
Jaturun Siripongs	Murder	1999	Lethal injection	Two cans of Lucky Arctic iced tea and two cups of Mission Pride canned peaches.
Darrell Keith Rich	Serial Murder	2000	Lethal injection	Tea, broth, and Gatorade.
Juanita Spinelli	Murder	1941	Gas chamber	Turkey meat and a hamburger.
Thomas Martin Thompson	Murder	1998	Lethal injection	Alaskan king crab with melted butter, spinach salad, pork fried rice, Mandarin-style spare ribs, hot fudge sundae and a six-pack of Coca-Cola.
Keith Daniel Williams	Murder	1996	Lethal injection	Fried pork chops, a baked potato with butter, asparagus, salad with blue cheese dressing, apple pie, and whole milk.
Stanley Tookie Williams III	Murder	2005	Lethal injection	Declined a special meal, but had some oatmeal and milk before his execution.

=== Federal government ===
Name	Crime	Year	Method of execution	Requested meal
George W. Barrett	Murder	1936	Hanging	Requested "the largest steak in town", but did not eat it. After his death, a reporter who had been present for the execution spotted the steak in the jail kitchen and helped himself to it.
Brandon Bernard	Murder	2020	Lethal injection	Meat lover's pizza and a brownie.
Alfred Bourgeois	Murder	2020	Lethal injection	Seafood-stuffed mushrooms, a platter of fried shrimp, shrimp Alfredo pasta, six buttered biscuits and cheesecake.
Victor Feguer	Murder	1963	Hanging	Requested a single olive with the pit still in it.
Carl Austin Hall	Kidnapping	1953	Gas chamber	Fried chicken.
Bonnie Brown Heady	Kidnapping	1953	Gas chamber	Fried chicken.
Juan Raul Garza	Murder and drug trafficking	2001	Lethal injection	Steak, french fries, onion rings, three slices of bread, and a soda.
Corey Johnson	Spree murder	2021	Lethal injection	Pizza, jelly-filled doughnuts, and a strawberry shake. Johnson did not receive the doughnuts despite ordering them, only the pizza and strawberry shake were served to him.
Louis Jones Jr.	Murder	2003	Lethal injection	Whole peaches, plums and nectarines.
Gerhard Puff	Murder	1954	Electrocution	Fried chicken, sweet potatoes, asparagus tips, brussels sprouts, cranberry sauce, salad and strawberry shortcake.
Timothy McVeigh	Domestic terrorism and mass murder	2001	Lethal injection	Two pints of mint chocolate chip ice cream.
Christopher Vialva	Murder	2020	Lethal injection	Pizza Hut.

=== Florida ===
Name	Crime	Year	Method of execution	Requested meal
Aubrey Dennis Adams Jr.	Murder	1989	Electrocution	One pound of popcorn shrimp, one pound of medium-size shrimp, one pound of jumbo shrimp (battered and fried), one loaf of garlic bread, french fries, pecan pie, pecan ice cream, and iced tea.
Mark James Asay	Murder	2017	Lethal injection	Fried pork chops, fried ham, French fries, vanilla swirl ice cream, and a can of Coca-Cola.
Oscar Ray Bolin Jr.	Serial murder	2016	Lethal injection	Medium rare rib eye steak, baked potato with butter and sour cream, salad made of iceberg lettuce, cucumber and tomato, garlic bread, lemon meringue pie, and a bottle of Coca-Cola.
Gary Ray Bowles	Serial murder	2019	Lethal injection	Three cheeseburgers, bacon and french fries.
Eric Scott Branch	Murder	2018	Lethal injection	Pork chop, T-bone steak, French fries and ice cream. Branch shared the last meal together with his daughter during a final prison visit before he was executed.
Judy Buenoano	Murder	1998	Electrocution	Asparagus, broccoli, strawberries, tomatoes and a cup of tea.
Theodore Robert Bundy	Serial murder	1989	Electrocution	Declined a special meal, so he was given (but did not eat) the traditional steak (medium-rare), eggs (over easy), hash browns, toast, milk, coffee, juice, butter, and jelly.
John Earl Bush	Murder	1996	Electrocution	One porterhouse steak, shrimp, two baked potatoes, a quarter of lemon pie and three glasses of orange juice.
Daniel Owen Conahan Jr.	Serial murder and rapist	2026	Lethal injection	Chicken, a baked potato, corn, soda and pumpkin pie.
Edward Castro	Murder	2000	Lethal injection	A T-bone steak, fried shrimp, fried potatoes, onion rings, fried tomatoes, ice cream and Coca-Cola.
Loran Kenstley Cole	Murder	2024	Lethal injection	Pizza, M&M's, ice cream and a soda. Cole shared his final meal with his son and a pen pal from outside prison.
Allen Lee Davis	Murder	1999	Electrocution	One lobster tail, fried potatoes, fried shrimp, fried clams, half a loaf of garlic bread, and a quart bottle of A&W root beer.
Ángel Nieves Díaz	Murder	2006	Lethal injection	Declined a special meal. He was served the regular prison meal for that day consisting of shredded turkey with taco seasoning, shredded cheese, rice, pinto beans, tortilla shells, apple crisp and iced tea, but declined that as well.
Donald David Dillbeck	Murder	2023	Lethal injection	Fried shrimp, mushrooms, onion rings, Butter Pecan ice cream, pecan pie, and chocolate.
James Aren Duckett	Child murder and rape	2026	Lethal injection	Eggs, grits, bacon, biscuits, and chocolate milk.
Michael Durocher	Serial murder	1993	Electrocution	Five pounds of fried jumbo shrimp, a pint of chocolate ice cream and a two-liter bottle of Pepsi.
James Dennis Ford	Murder	2025	Lethal injection	A steak, macaroni and cheese, fried okra, sweet potato, pumpkin pie and sweet tea.
Marvin Francois	Mass murder	1985	Electrocution	Shrimp, lobster tail, barbecued spare ribs, chicken breast, watermelon, strawberries, sliced tomatoes, and french fries.
Louis Gaskin	Serial murder	2023	Lethal injection	Barbeque pork ribs, buffalo wings, turkey neck, shrimp fried rice, french fries with honey barbeque sauce, and water.
Robert Dewey Glock	Kidnapping and murder	2001	Lethal injection	A New York strip steak, fried shrimp, green beans, Coca-Cola and ice cream.
Arthur Frederick Goode III	Murder	1984	Electrocution	A steak, corn, broccoli and cookies.
David Alan Gore	Serial murder	2012	Lethal injection	Fried chicken, french fries and butter pecan ice cream.
James Ernest Hitchcock	Child murder and rape	2026	Lethal injection	Salad, chicken, ice cream, pie and soda.
Jeffrey Hutchinson	Mass murder	2025	Lethal injection	Salmon, mahi-mahi, asparagus, baked potato and iced tea.
Edward Thomas James	Double murder and rape	2025	Lethal injection	Fried catfish, potato salad, hush puppies, cookies, soda and coffee.
Bryan Frederick Jennings	Child murder and rape	2025	Lethal injection	One cheeseburger, soda and fries.
Michael Lee King	Murder and rape	2026	Lethal injection	Pizza, ice cream, soda and tater tots.
Thomas Knight	Murder	2014	Lethal injection	A bag of Fritos, sweet potato pie, coconut cake, banana nut bread, vanilla ice cream, butter pecan ice cream, strawberries and a quart bottle of Sprite.
Bobby Joe Long	Serial murder	2019	Lethal injection	Roast beef, bacon, french fries and soda.
Harold Gene Lucas	Murder	2026	Lethal Injection	Steak, fries, biscuits, pie, ice cream and milk.
Dominick Anthony Occhicone Jr.	Double murder	2026	Lethal Injection	Eggplant parmesan, a salad, garlic bread and a Pepsi.
Duane Eugene Owen	Double murder and rape	2023	Lethal injection	Bacon cheeseburger with no bun, onion rings, strawberries, cherry ice cream, a vanilla milkshake and coffee.
Manuel Pardo Jr.	Serial murder	2012	Lethal injection	Roast pork, red beans, rice, avocado, tomatoes, plantains, pumpkin pie, olive oil, egg nog, and Cuban Coffee.
Thomas Harrison Provenzano	Murder	2000	Lethal injection	Half a grilled cheese sandwich, half a peanut butter and jelly sandwich, baked beans, hot canned apples, two slices of bread and tea.
Glen Edward Rogers	Murder	2025	Lethal injection	Pizza, chocolate cake, soda.
Danny Rolling	Serial murder	2006	Lethal injection	Lobster tail, butterfly shrimp, baked potato, strawberry cheesecake, and sweet tea.
Mark Dean Schwab	Murder	2008	Lethal injection	Fried eggs, bacon, sausage links, hash browns, buttered toast and a quart of chocolate milk.
Terry Melvin Sims	Murder	2000	Lethal injection	Grouper, french fries, chef salad with bleu cheese dressing, Coca cola, and Boston cream pie.
William Reaves Jr.	Murder	2026	Lethal injection	Crackers and juice.
Samuel Lee Smithers	Double murder	2025	Lethal injection	Fried chicken, fried fish, a baked potato, apple pie with vanilla ice cream and a sweet tea.
Dusty Ray Spencer	Murder	2026	Lethal injection	A pizza, french fries and a milkshake.
John Arthur Spenkelink	Murder	1979	Electrocution	A flask of Jack Daniel's, shared with the prison superintendent.
Gerald Eugene Stano	Serial murder	1998	Electrocution	Delmonico steak, a baked potato with sour cream and bacon bits, tossed salad with Roquefort dressing, buttered lima beans, a half gallon of mint chocolate-chip ice cream and a 2-litre bottle of Pepsi.
Robert Austin Sullivan	Murder	1983	Electrocution	Steak, french fries, milk, and fresh strawberries.
Michael Anthony Tanzi	Murder	2025	Lethal injection	Pork chop, bacon, a baked potato, corn, soda, ice cream, and a candy bar.
Frank Athen Walls	Seriel killer and rapist	2025	Lethal injection	Chicken, steak, baked potato, vegetable, cheesecake and juice.
Jerry White	Murder	1995	Electrocution	Grilled round steak, French fried potatoes, coleslaw, toast, and orange juice.
Aileen Wuornos	Serial murder	2002	Lethal injection	Had Kentucky Fried Chicken with a friend a few days before the execution. On the day of the execution, she had a hamburger and other snack food from the prison's canteen. Later, she drank a cup of coffee.
Edward James Zakrzewski II	Mass murder	2025	Lethal injection	Fried pork chops, fried onions, potatoes, bacon, toast, root beer, ice cream, pie and coffee.

=== Georgia ===
Name	Crime	Year	Method of execution	Requested meal
Jack Alderman	Murder	2008	Lethal injection	Declined a special meal and was given the regular prison meal of the day consisting of baked fish, peas, cole slaw, carrots, cheese grits, buns, fruit juice, and chocolate cake. Alderman originally chose fried chicken, fried shrimps and a pint of cherry or strawberry ice cream as a last meal, but did not receive it since his execution was stayed.
Andrew Howard Brannan	Murder	2015	Lethal injection	3 eggs over easy, hash browns, biscuits and gravy, sausage, pecan waffles with strawberries, milk, apple juice and decaf coffee.
Christopher Allen Burger	Murder	1993	Electrocution	Water and unleavened bread.
Robert Earl Butts Jr.	Murder	2018	Lethal injection	A bacon cheeseburger with American and cheddar cheese, a ribeye steak, six chicken tenders, seasoned French fries, cheesecake and strawberry lemonade.
Robert Dale Conklin	Malice murder	2005	Lethal injection	Filet mignon steak wrapped in bacon; de-veined shrimp sautéed in garlic butter with lemon; a baked potato filled with sour cream, chives and bacon bits; corn on the cob; asparagus with hollandaise sauce; a buttered French baguette with goat cheese; cantaloupe; apple pie; vanilla bean ice cream and iced tea.
Troy Anthony Davis	Murder	2011	Lethal injection	Declined a special meal and was offered the standard meal tray: grilled cheeseburgers, oven-browned potatoes, baked beans, coleslaw, cookies and a grape drink.
Melbert Ray Ford Jr.	Murder	2010	Lethal injection	Fried fish, shrimp, a baked potato, salad, boiled corn, ice cream, cheesecake and soda.
Carlton Michael Gary	Serial murder	2018	Lethal injection	Declined a special meal and requested the regular prison meal of the day: a grilled hamburger, hot dog, white beans, coleslaw and grape beverage.
Kelly Renee Gissendaner	Murder	2015	Lethal injection	Cheese dip with chips, Texas nachos with fajita meat and a diet frosted lemonade. Previously Gissendaner had cornbread, buttermilk, two Burger King Whoppers, two large orders of french fries, cherry vanilla ice cream, popcorn, lemonade and a salad with boiled eggs, tomatoes, green peppers, onions, carrots, cheese and Paul Newman buttermilk dressing before her execution was stayed.
Warren Lee Hill Jr.	Murder	2015	Lethal injection	Declined a special meal and was offered the institutional meal tray, consisting of shepherd's pie, mashed potatoes, red beans, cabbage relish salad, cornbread, sugar cookies and fruit punch.
Brandon Astor Jones	Murder	2016	Lethal injection	Refused the option of choosing his last meal, so he was given the standard meal on the menu that day of chicken and rice, rutabaga, seasoned turnip greens, dry white beans, cornbread, bread pudding and fruit punch.
Donnie Cleveland Lance	Double murder	2020	Lethal injection	Two chili steak burgers, french fries, onion rings, mustard, ketchup, and a soda.
William Earl Lynd	Murder	2008	Lethal injection	Two pepper jack barbecue burgers with crispy onions, baked potatoes with sour cream, bacon and cheese, and a large strawberry milkshake.
Willie James Pye	Murder	2024	Lethal injection	Two chicken sandwiches, two cheeseburgers, french fries, two bags of plain potato chips, and two lemon-lime sodas.
Thomas Dean Stevens	Murder	1993	Electrocution	Declined a special last meal offer, but agreed to receive the regular prison meal set of spaghetti with meat sauce, green beans, rolls, peach cobbler and iced tea.
Marion Wilson Jr.	Murder	2019	Lethal injection	One medium thin-crust pizza with everything, 20 buffalo wings, one pint of butter pecan ice cream, some apple pie and grape juice.

=== Louisiana ===
Name	Crime	Year	Method of execution	Requested meal
Gerald James Bordelon	Murder	2010	Lethal injection	Fried sac-a-lait, topped with crawfish étouffée, a peanut butter and apple jelly sandwich, and chocolate chip cookies.
Willie Francis	Murder	1947	Electrocution	Fried catfish and potatoes.
Jimmy L. Glass	Murder	1987	Electrocution	A pepperoni pizza, a chef salad with blue cheese dressing, fresh peaches and cream, and two soft drinks.
Leslie Dale Martin	Murder	2002	Lethal injection	Boiled crawfish, crawfish stew, a garden salad with Italian dressing, oatmeal cookies and whole milk with chocolate syrup.
Dalton Prejean	Murder	1990	Electrocution	A seafood platter and an orange soda.
Dobie Gillis Williams	Murder	1999	Lethal injection	Twelve chocolate bars and some ice cream.
Jimmy Wingo	Murder	1987	Electrocution	A fried seafood platter with extra shrimp, French fries, and a Coke.

=== Missouri ===
Name	Crime	Year	Method of execution	Requested meal
Maurice Oscar Byrd	Mass murder	1991	Lethal injection	Lobster, steak, bacon, shrimp fried rice and chicken breast.
Russell Earl Bucklew	Murder	2019	Lethal injection	A Greek gyro, a smoked brisket sandwich, two orders of french fries, Coca-Cola and a banana split. Previously Bucklew had a t-bone steak, caesar salad, baked potato and apple pie a la mode, before his execution was stayed.
Christopher Leroy Collings	Murder	2024	Lethal injection	A bacon cheeseburger, breaded mushrooms, tater tots and a chef salad.
Carman L. Deck	Murder	2022	Lethal injection	A ribeye steak, shrimps, asparagus, a salad with Italian dressing, cottage cheese and V8 juice.
Brian Joseph Dorsey	Murder	2024	Lethal injection	Two bacon double cheeseburgers; two orders of chicken strips; two large orders of seasoned fries; and a pizza with sausage, pepperoni, onion, mushrooms, and extra cheese.
David Russell Hosier	Double murder (Note: Hosier killed his ex-wife and her husband but was only convicted of murdering his ex-wife.)	2024	Lethal injection	Steak, a baked potato, Texas toast, apple pie, milk and orange juice.
Johnny Allen Johnson	Murder	2023	Lethal injection	A bacon cheeseburger, curly fries and a strawberry shake.
Ernest Lee Johnson	Murder	2021	Lethal injection	Two double bacon cheeseburgers, onion rings, two large strawberry milkshakes and a large pizza.
Stanley Dewaine Lingar	Murder	2001	Lethal injection	Corned beef sandwiches and french fries.
Amber McLaughlin	Murder and rape	2023	Lethal injection	A cheeseburger, french fries, a strawberry milkshake and peanut M&Ms.
Roderick Nunley	Murder	2015	Lethal injection	Steak, shrimp, chicken strips, salad, and a slice of cheesecake.
Lance Shockley	Murder	2025	Lethal injection	Peanut butter, three packs of oatmeal, water, and two sports drinks from the prison canteen.
Michael Taylor	Murder	2014	Lethal injection	He did not use his right to request a specific last meal and was served potato soup and a sandwich.
Marcellus Williams	Murder	2024	Lethal injection	Chicken wings and tater tots.

=== Ohio ===
Name	Crime	Year	Method of execution	Requested meal
Herman Dale Ashworth	Murder	2005	Lethal injection	Two cheeseburgers with lettuce and mayonnaise, french fries with ketchup, one Dr Pepper and one Mountain Dew.
Robert Anthony Buell	Murder	2002	Lethal injection	A single, unpitted black olive.
Kenneth Biros	Murder and robbery	2009	Lethal injection	A cheese pizza, onion rings, fried mushrooms, potato chips, French onion dip, cherry pie, blueberry ice cream and one Dr Pepper.
Alton Coleman	Murder spree	2002	Lethal injection	Well done filet mignon smothered with mushrooms, fried chicken breasts, biscuits and gravy, salad with French dressing, french fries, onion rings, broccoli with melted cheese, collard greens, cornbread, sweet potato pie with whipped cream and a cherry Coca-Cola.
Richard Cooey	Murder and rape	2008	Lethal injection	T-bone steak with A-1 sauce, 4 eggs over easy, hash browns, onion rings, french fries, buttered toast, a pint of rocky road ice cream, bear claw pastries and a Mountain Dew.
John Fautenberry	Serial killer	2009	Lethal injection	Two eggs sunny side up, fried potatoes, two slices of fried bologna, four slices of wheat bread, two slices of buttered wheat toast, four tomato slices, lettuce with mayonnaise, two 3 Musketeers bars and two packages of Reese's Peanut Butter Cups.
Marvallous Matthew Keene	Spree murder	2009	Lethal injection	Porterhouse steak with A-1 sauce, one pound of jumbo fried shrimp with cocktail sauce, French fries and onion rings, a tube of Pillsbury dinner rolls and butter, two plums, a mango, one pound of seedless white grapes, German chocolate cake, two bottles of Pepsi and two bottles of A&W Cream Soda.
Ernest Martin	Murder	2003	Lethal injection	A cheeseburger, french fries, apple pie and a Pepsi.
Dennis B. McGuire	Murder	2014	Lethal injection	Roast beef, fried chicken, a bagel with cream cheese, fried potatoes with onions, potato salad, butter pecan ice cream and a bottle of Coca-Cola.
Ronald Ray Phillips	Murder and rape	2017	Lethal injection	A large cheese, bell pepper and mushroom pizza; strawberry cheesecake, a piece of unleavened bread, a bottle of Pepsi and grape juice.
James H. Snook	Murder	1930	Electrocution	Fried chicken, lamb chops, mashed potatoes, ice cream and coffee.
Frank G. Spisak	Murder	2011	Lethal injection	Spaghetti with tomato sauce, a salad, chocolate cake and coffee.
Robert Van Hook	Murder	2018	Lethal injection	Double cheeseburgers, fries, strawberry cheesecake with whipped cream, a vanilla milkshake and grapefruit juice.
William G. Zuern Jr.	Murder	2004	Lethal injection	Mashed potatoes and gravy, lasagna, macaroni and cheese, corn, garlic bread, chocolate milk, and cherry cheesecake.

=== Oklahoma ===
Name	Crime	Year	Method of execution	Requested meal
Wanda Jean Allen	Murder	2001	Lethal injection	A bag of potato chips.
Scott Dawn Carpenter	Murder	1997	Lethal injection	Barbecue beef ribs, baked beans, corn-on-the-cob, potato salad, hot rolls and lemonade.
James Dwight Pavatt	Murder	2026	Lethal injection	Three-meat barbecue dinner and a strawberry milkshake.
John David Duty	Murder	2010	Lethal injection	A double cheeseburger with mayonnaise, a foot-long hot dog with cheese, mustard and extra onions, a cherry limeade, and a large banana milkshake.
Lewis Eugene Gilbert	Murder	2003	Lethal injection	A half-gallon of vanilla ice cream, a box of assorted cones and a box of Whoppers.
John Marion Grant	Murder	2021	Lethal injection	Two bacon cheeseburgers with onion, tomato, pickles, lettuce and mustard, barbeque chips, a 2-liter bottle of Mr. Pibb, a half-gallon of Neapolitan ice cream, and a large pack of Nutter Butter sandwich cookies.
Thomas J. Grasso	Murder	1995	Lethal injection	Two dozen steamed mussels, two dozen steamed clams, a double cheeseburger from Burger King, half-dozen barbecued spare ribs, two strawberry milkshakes, half a pumpkin pie with whipped cream, and diced strawberries. He also had a 16-ounce can of spaghetti with meatballs, served at room temperature. However, he issued a public statement complaining that he had requested SpaghettiOs, not regular canned spaghetti.
James Allen Coddington	Murder	2022	Lethal Injection	Two cheeseburgers, two crunchy fish sandwiches, two large fries and a large soda.
Wendell Arden Grissom	Murder	2025	Lethal injection	A medium Canadian bacon supreme pizza, one pint of vanilla ice cream and one pint of Coca-Cola.
Scott Allen Hain	Murder	2003	Lethal injection	Three cheeseburgers, three orders of onion rings, ice cream and a Slush.
Phillip Dean Hancock	Double murder	2023	Lethal injection	Fried chicken and root beer.
George John Hanson	Double murder	2025	Lethal injection	Hanson did not make a special last meal request, but he received the regular prison meal of chicken pot pie, two rolls, two fruit cups and carrots.
Raymond Eugene Johnson	Double murder	2026	Lethal injection	Chicken, a pint of gizzards, and fried pickles with hot sauce and ranch dressing.
Emmanuel Antonia Littlejohn	Murder	2024	Lethal injection	A max meat pizza, two slices of cheesecake and a Coke.
Clayton Derrell Lockett	Murder	2014	Lethal injection	Chateaubriand steak, shrimp, a large baked potato and a Kentucky bourbon pecan pie. The meal was denied because it exceeded the $15 limit. He rejected a separate offer from the warden for a dinner from Western Sizzlin'.
Jay Wesley Neill	Mass murder	2002	Lethal injection	A double cheeseburger, french fries, peach or cherry cobbler, a pint of vanilla ice cream and a large bottle of cranberry-grape juice.
Norman Lee Newsted	Murder	1999	Lethal injection	Five tacos, five doughnuts and a vanilla milkshake.
Gilbert Ray Postelle	Murder	2022	Lethal injection	20 chicken nuggets with Ranch, BBQ and honey mustard dips, three large servings of French fries with ketchup, a crispy chicken sandwich, a regular chicken sandwich, a large cola and a caramel frappe.
Richard Norman Rojem Jr.	Murder	2024	Lethal injection	A small Little Caesars's pizza with double cheese and double pepperoni, eight salt packets, eight crushed red pepper packets, a bottle of ginger ale, a Styrofoam cup and two vanilla ice cream cups.
Anthony Sanchez	Murder	2023	Lethal injection	Chicken fried steak, fried okra, mashed potatoes and gravy, a roll, sweet iced tea and apple pie with vanilla ice cream.
Sean Richard Sellers	Serial murder	1999	Lethal injection	Eggrolls, wonton, sweet and sour chicken, batter-fried shrimp, chow mein noodles, stir-fried vegetables, three cans of V8 juice, and a Squirt soda.
Steven Ray Thacker	Murder	2013	Lethal injection	One large meat lover’s pizza, a small bag of peanut M&Ms and an A&W root beer.
Kevin Ray Underwood	Murder	2024	Lethal injection	Chicken-fried steak, mashed potatoes with gravy, a cheeseburger with french fries and ketchup, pinto beans, a hot roll and a cola drink.
Gary Alan Walker	Serial murder	2000	Lethal injection	Three cheeseburgers with extra salt, three sliced tomatoes, french fries and a strawberry malt.

=== South Carolina ===
Name	Crime	Year	Method of execution	Requested meal
John Arnold	Murder	1998	Lethal injection	A submarine sandwich, tossed salad, French fries and a vanilla milkshake, shared with his attorneys.
Jeffrey Brian Motts	Seriel killer	2011	Lethal injections	Pizza, fried fish, popcorn shrimp, cherry cheesecake and sweet iced tea.
Marion Bowman Jr.	Murder	2025	Lethal injection	Fried shrimp, fish, oysters, chicken wings, chicken tenders, onion rings, banana pudding, German chocolate cake, pineapple juice and cranberry juice.
Stephen Corey Bryant	Spree murder	2025	Firing squad	Spicy mixed seafood stir-fry, fried fish over rice, egg rolls, stuffed shrimp, two candy bars, and German chocolate cake.
Larry Gilbert	Murder	1998	Lethal injection	Fish, cornbread, salad, french fries, pecan pie and tea.
J. D. Gleaton	Murder	1998	Lethal injection	Cinnamon roll, banana pudding, cheese and orange juice.
Richard Charles Johnson	Murder	2002	Lethal injection	Fried shrimp, fried oysters, french fries, chocolate cake and iced tea.
Mikal Mahdi	Murder	2025	Firing squad	A ribeye steak cooked medium, mushroom risotto, broccoli, collard greens, cheesecake and sweet tea.
Richard Bernard Moore	Murder	2024	Lethal injection	A medium steak, fried catfish and shrimp, scalloped potatoes, green peas, broccoli with cheese, sweet potato pie, German chocolate cake and grape juice.
Freddie Eugene Owens	Murder	2024	Lethal injection	A ribeye steak, cooked well-done, two cheeseburgers, six chicken wings, french fries, two strawberry sodas and a slice of apple pie.
Joseph Carl Shaw	Murder	1985	Electrocution	Pizza and tossed salad.
Brad Keith Sigmon	Murder	2025	Firing squad	Kentucky Fried Chicken, green beans, mashed potatoes with gravy, biscuits, cheesecake and sweet tea.
Stephen Stanko	Murder	2025	Lethal injection	Fried fish, fried shrimp, crab cakes, a baked potato, carrots, fried okra, cherry pie, banana pudding and sweet tea.
Hastings Arthur Wise	Mass murder	2005	Lethal injection	Lobster tail, french fries, coleslaw, banana pudding and milk.

=== Tennessee ===
Name	Crime	Year	Method of Execution	Requested Meal
Sedley Alley	Murder	2006	Lethal injection	Pizza pockets, ice cream, iced oatmeal cookies, and milk.
Byron Lewis Black	Triple murder	2025	Lethal injection	Pizza with mushrooms and sausage, donuts, and butter pecan ice cream.
Robert Glen Coe	Murder Kidnapping	2000	Lethal injection	Fried catfish, white beans, hush puppies, coleslaw, french fries, pecan pie, and sweet tea.
Leroy Hall Jr.	Murder Arson	2019	Electrocution	Philly cheesesteak, two orders of onion rings, a slice of cheesecake and a Pepsi.
Steve Henley	Double Murder	2009	Lethal Injection	A seafood plate of shrimp, oysters, fried fish, onion rings and hush puppies.
Anthony Darrell Dugard Hines	Murder Rape	2026	Lethal Injection	Fried chicken, mashed potatoes and gravy, coleslaw, corn, fries, biscuits, a chicken sandwich, chocolate chip cake, and a sweet tea.
Daryl Keith Holton	Murder	2007	Electrocution	Declined a special request, but ate the standard meal of the day consisting of riblets on a bun, mixed vegetables, baked beans, white cake with white icing and iced tea.
Billy Ray Irick	Murder	2018	Lethal injection	A "super deluxe" cheeseburger and onion rings combo meal, with a Pepsi soda.
Cecil Johnson Jr.	Triple murder	2009	Lethal injection	Refused a last meal.
Donnie Edward Johnson	Murder	2019	Lethal injection	Declined a final meal; instead requested supporters to donate meals to the homeless.
David Earl Miller	Murder	2018	Electrocution	Fried chicken, mashed potatoes, biscuits and coffee.
Julius Morgan	Rape	1916	Electrocution	A breakfast that included "all the watermelon he could eat".
Harold Wayne Nichols	Murder Serial Rape	2025	Lethal injection	Beef brisket, coleslaw, a baked potato, onion rings, deviled eggs, cheese biscuits and fruit tea.
Oscar Franklin Smith	Mass murder	2025	Lethal injection	Hot dogs, tater tots, an apple pie and vanilla ice cream. For a prior-scheduled execution in 2022 that was temporarily reprieved, he had a double bacon cheeseburger, a deep-dish apple pie, and vanilla bean ice cream.
Nicholas Todd Sutton	Murder	2020	Electrocution	Fried pork chops, mashed potatoes with gravy and peach pie with vanilla ice cream.
Stephen Michael West	Double murder Kidnapping	2019	Electrocution	Philly cheesesteak and french fries.
Philip Ray Workman	Murder	2007	Lethal injection	Declined a special meal for himself, but he asked for a large vegetarian pizza to be given to a homeless person in Nashville, Tennessee. This request was denied by the prison, but carried out by others across the country.
Edmund Zagorski	Double murder	2018	Electrocution	Pickled ham hocks and pig tails.

=== Texas ===
After Texas abolished last meal requests in 2011, all death row inmates in Texas have been served regular prison food.

Name	Crime	Year	Method of execution	Requested meal
James David Autry	Murder	1984	Lethal injection	A hamburger, french fries and a Dr Pepper.
Odell Barnes Jr.	Murder	2000	Lethal injection	"Justice, equality, and world peace."
Lawrence Russell Brewer	Murder	2011	Lethal injection	Two chicken fried steaks smothered in gravy with sliced onions, a triple meat bacon cheeseburger with fixings on the side, a cheese omelet with ground beef, tomatoes, onions, bell peppers and jalapeños, a large bowl of fried okra with ketchup, one pound of barbecue with half a loaf of white bread, three fajitas with fixings, a meat lovers pizza, three root beers, one pint of Blue Bell vanilla ice cream, and a slab of peanut butter fudge with crushed peanuts. Brewer's request was granted, but he refused the meal when it arrived saying that he was simply not hungry, prompting Texas to stop granting last meal requests to condemned inmates.
Charles Brooks Jr.	Murder	1982	Lethal injection	A T-bone steak, french fries, ketchup, Worcestershire sauce, biscuits, peach cobbler and iced tea. Originally Brooks wanted fried shrimp and oysters, but the prison chef told him shellfish was not an option.
Ruben Cantu	Murder	1993	Lethal injection	Fried chicken and rice.
Richard Cartwright	Murder	2005	Lethal injection	Fried chicken, a cheeseburger, onion rings, french fries, bacon, sausage, cheesecake and cinnamon rolls.
Ignacio Cuevas	Perpetrator of the 1974 Huntsville Prison Siege	1991	Lethal injection	Chicken and dumplings, steamed rice, sliced bread, black-eyed peas, and iced tea.
Donald Gene Franklin	Murder and rape	1988	Lethal injection	A hamburger and french fries.
Humberto Leal Garcia	Murder and rape	2011	Lethal injection	Fried chicken, pico de gallo, tacos, two Cokes and a bowl of fried okra.
Johnny Frank Garrett	Murder	1992	Lethal injection	Ice cream.
Stephen Albert McCoy	Serial murder	1989	Lethal injection	A cheeseburger, french fries, and a strawberry milkshake.
Kenneth Allen McDuff	Serial murder	1998	Lethal injection	Two T-bone steaks (well done) with all the fixings.
Eliseo Moreno	Murder spree	1987	Lethal injection	Four cheese enchiladas, two fish patties, french fried potatoes with ketchup, milk and lemon pie.
Stephen Peter Morin	Serial murder	1985	Lethal injection	A T-bone steak, a baked potato, butter, sweet green peas, bread rolls, banana pudding and coffee.
Eric Charles Nenno	Murder and rape	2008	Lethal injection	A grilled cheeseburger, four fish patties, six hard boiled eggs and coffee.
Ronald Clark O'Bryan	Murder	1984	Lethal injection	T-bone steak (medium to well done), french fries with ketchup, whole kernel corn, sweet peas, a lettuce and tomato salad with sliced egg and French dressing, iced tea, sweetener, saltines, Boston cream pie, and rolls.
James Emery Paster	Serial murder	1989	Lethal injection	Steak, salad, french fried potatoes, and watermelon.
James Edward Smith	Murder	1990	Lethal injection	A lump of dirt, which was denied. He settled for a cup of yogurt.
Karla Faye Tucker	Murder	1998	Lethal injection	A banana, a peach and a salad with either ranch or Italian dressing.
Steven Michael Woods Jr.	Double murder	2011	Lethal injection	Two pounds of bacon, a large four-meat pizza, four fried chicken breasts, two Mountain Dews, Pepsis, root beers and sweet teas, two pints of ice cream, five chicken fried steaks, two hamburgers with bacon, fries and a dozen garlic bread sticks with marinara on the side.

=== Virginia ===
Name	Crime	Year	Method of execution	Requested meal
Earl Bramblett	Mass murder	2003	Electrocution	Declined a special meal and was given the regular prison meal of the day consisting of sloppy joes, boiled potatoes, corn and chocolate cake.
James Briley	Murder, rape and robbery	1985	Electrocution	Fried shrimps with cocktail sauce and a lemon-lime soft drink.
Linwood Briley	Murder, rape and robbery	1984	Electrocution	Grilled tenderloin steak, baked potato, green peas, salad with French dressing, peaches, buttered rolls, cake, fruit punch and milk.
Douglas Buchanan Jr.	Mass murder	1998	Lethal injection	Fried chicken, sliced bread, chocolate cake, and a beverage.
Albert Jay Clozza	Murder	1991	Electrocution	Did not request for a special last meal, but accepted a dinner of chili, rice, peas, pasta salad and chocolate cake.
Edward Benton Fitzgerald Sr.	Murder	1992	Electrocution	Pizza and Pepsi-Cola, although he asked prison officials to not reveal his final meal request.
Brandon Hedrick	Murder	2006	Electrocution	Pizza with cheese, bacon and hamburger meat; French fries with ketchup; bacon; chocolate cake and apple pie.
Mir Aimal Kansi	Perpetrator of the CIA headquarters shooting	2002	Lethal injection	Fried rice, bananas, boiled eggs and wheat bread.
Teresa Lewis	Proxy murder	2010	Lethal injection	Two fried chicken breasts, sweet peas with butter, a Dr Pepper and apple pie for dessert.
Morris Mason	Murder, rape and robbery	1985	Electrocution	Four Big Macs, two large orders of French fries, two ice cream sundaes, two apple pies, and two large grape sodas, which he shared with two guards.
John Allen Muhammad	Murder	2009	Lethal injection	Chicken and several cakes.
Syvasky Poyner	Mass murder	1993	Electrocution	Fried chicken, rice and gravy, and green beans.
Mark Arlo Sheppard	Serial murder	1999	Lethal injection	The vegetarian meal set from the prison's menu: boiled potatoes, fried cabbage, bean entree, bread pudding, sliced bread, fruit punch and milk.

=== Other states ===
Name	Crime	State	Year	Method of execution	Requested meal
Charles Albanese	Serial murder	Illinois	1995	Lethal injection	Prime rib, baked potato, garlic bread, coffee, Coca-Cola and pistachio ice cream.
Lowell Lee Andrews	Murder	Kansas	1962	Hanging	Two fried chickens with sides of mashed potatoes, green beans and Pie a la Mode.
Joe Arridy	Falsely accused of rape and murder	Colorado	1939	Gas chamber	Ice cream.
Billy Bailey	Murder	Delaware	1996	Hanging	Steak (well-done), a baked potato with sour cream and butter, peas, buttered rolls and vanilla ice cream.
Wesley Eugene Baker	Murder	Maryland	2005	Lethal injection	Breaded fish, pasta marinara, green beans, bread, orange fruit punch and milk (this was what was on the prison menu that day).
Velma Barfield	Murder	North Carolina	1984	Lethal injection	Declined a special meal, having a bag of Cheez Doodles and a can of Coca-Cola instead.
Martha Beck	Serial murder	New York	1951	Electrocution	Fried chicken, fried potatoes and salad.
Donald Ray Wallace Jr.	Mass murder	Indiana	2005	Lethal injection	Filet mignon, baked potato, soup and cake.
John A. Bennett	Rape and attempted murder	United States Army	1961	Hanging	Shrimp with cocktail sauce, hot rolls, cake, peaches, milk and coffee.
Rodney Berget	Murder	South Dakota	2018	Lethal injection	Pancakes, waffles, maple syrup and butter, scrambled eggs, sausages, french fries, Pepsi, and Cherry Nibs licorice.
Rainey Bethea	Murder and rape	Kentucky	1936	Hanging	Fried chicken, pork chops, mashed potatoes, cornbread, pickles, lemon pie, and ice cream.
Jesse Bishop	Murder	Nevada	1979	Gas chamber	Filet mignon, asparagus, baked potato with sour cream, tossed salad with Thousand Island dressing and an unspecified dessert.
Jake Bird	Murder	Washington	1949	Hanging	Fried chicken, strawberries and ice cream, and orange pop.
Cal Coburn Brown	Murder	Washington	2010	Lethal injection	Combination meat pizza, apple pie, coffee, and milk.
Alvaro Calambro	Double murder	Nevada	1999	Lethal injection	Steak, rice, corn, applesauce and a Sprite.
Ward Beecher Caraway	Murder	New York	1947	Electric chair	Declined the warden's traditional offer to pick his own choices for his last two meals and opted for the regular prison menu instead. His lunch consisted of Frankfurters, cabbage, potatoes, bread and coffee, while he had kidney beans, a baked potato, cake and tea for dinner.
Desmond Keith Carter	Murder	North Carolina	2002	Lethal injection	Declined a special meal, but had two cheeseburgers, a steak sandwich, and two cans of Coca-Cola from the prison canteen, for which he paid $4.20 from his prison account.
Carroll Cole	Serial murder	Nevada	1985	Lethal injection	Jumbo shrimp, clam chowder, french fries, tossed salad with French dressing, cookies and candy.
Joseph Edward Corcoran	Mass murder	Indiana	2024	Lethal injection	Ben & Jerry's ice cream.
Charles Ray Crawford	Murder	Mississippi	2025	Lethal injection	Double cheeseburger, french fries, peach cobbler and chocolate ice cream.
Francis Crowley	Murder	New York	1932	Electrocution	Steak and onions, french fries, apple pie and ice cream.
Gary Lee Davis	Murder	Colorado	1997	Lethal injection	Chocolate and vanilla ice cream cups, shared with the prison superintendent and a manager.
John Deering	Murder	Utah	1938	Firing squad	Pheasant.
Westley Allan Dodd	Serial murder and child molestation	Washington	1993	Hanging	Broiled salmon and scalloped potatoes.
James Homer Elledge	Murder	Washington	2001	Lethal injection	Eggs, bacon, waffles, sweet roll, cereal and orange juice. Elledge did not eat the dinner despite requesting it; his last meal was instead breakfast consisting of eggs, oatmeal, hash browns, toast, apple juice and coffee.
Samuel Russell Flippen	Murder	North Carolina	2006	Lethal injection	Popcorn shrimp, hush puppies, french fries and a Coke.
John Wayne Gacy	Serial murder	Illinois	1994	Lethal injection	A dozen deep-fried shrimp, a bucket of Kentucky Fried Chicken, french fries, a pound of strawberries, and a bottle of Diet Coke.
Ronnie Lee Gardner	Murder	Utah	2010	Firing squad	Lobster tail, steak, apple pie with vanilla ice cream, and 7 Up. He also requested to watch The Lord of the Rings while he ate his meal.
Chester Gillette	Murder	New York	1908	Electrocution	Poached eggs, fried potatoes, rolls, coffee and several small cakes.
Gary Gilmore	Murder	Utah	1977	Firing squad	A hamburger, hard-boiled eggs, a baked potato, a few cups of coffee, and three shots of (contraband) Jack Daniel's whiskey.
Jack Gilbert Graham	Mass murder	Colorado	1957	Gas chamber	Declined a special meal, but was given a meal consisting of steak, fried potatoes, tossed salad, fruit cocktail and ice cream by prison officials. Graham ate only the ice cream.
Edward Lee Harper Jr.	Murder	Kentucky	1999	Lethal injection	Three bacon, lettuce and tomato sandwiches, a bag of potato chips, a piece of pecan pie with vanilla ice cream and an RC Cola.
Edward Ernest Hartman	Murder	North Carolina	2003	Lethal injection	A Greek salad, linguini with white clam sauce, cheesecake with cherry topping, garlic bread, and Coca-Cola.
Bruno Richard Hauptmann	Lindbergh kidnapping and murder	New Jersey	1936	Electrocution	Celery, stuffed green olives, roast chicken, french fried potatoes, buttered peas, cherries, and a slice of white cake.
Harry T. Hayward	Murder	Minnesota	1895	Hanging	Requested mallard duck, sweet potatoes, mashed potatoes, half of a pie, a pint of cream, hot rolls, and Vienna bread.
Gary Michael Heidnik	Murder	Pennsylvania	1999	Lethal injection	Two slices of cheese pizza and two cups of black coffee.
Mark Hopkinson	Proxy murder	Wyoming	1992	Lethal injection	Pizza, shared with his mother and other family members. He later asked for and received a fruit plate.
Ralph Hudson	Murder	New Jersey	1963	Electrocution	Prime rib steak, ice cream and a cigar.
Shannon M. Johnson	Murder	Delaware	2012	Lethal injection	Chicken lo Mein, carrots, cake, wheat bread and margarine and iced tea.
Richard Gerald Jordan	Murder	Mississippi	2025	Lethal injection	Chicken tenders, french fries, strawberry ice cream, and a root beer float.
John Joubert	Serial murder	Nebraska	1996	Electrocution	Cheese pizza with green pepper and onions, strawberry cheesecake, and Coca-Cola.
Steven Timothy Judy	Mass murder	Indiana	1981	Electrocution	Prime rib, lobster tails, potatoes with sour cream, chef salad with French dressing and a dinner roll. He also requested four cans of beer but they were denied.
Barton Kay Kirkham	Robbery and murder	Utah	1958	Hanging	Pizzas and ice cream.
Richard Albert Leavitt	Murder	Idaho	2012	Lethal injection	Baked chicken, french fries, and milk.
Thomas Edwin Loden Jr.	Murder	Mississippi	2022	Lethal injection	Fried pork chops, fried okra, a baked sweet potato, Pillsbury Grands biscuits with butter and molasses, peach cobbler with French vanilla ice cream and a Lipton sweet tea.
Daryl Linnie Mack	Murder	Nevada	2006	Lethal injection	Fish fillet sandwich, french fries and a soft drink.
Duncan Peder McKenzie Jr.	Murder	Montana	1995	Lethal injection	Tenderloin steak (medium), french fries, a tossed salad, orange sherbet and whole milk.
Harold I. McQueen Jr.	Murder	Kentucky	1997	Electrocution	Two cheesecakes, shared with his attorney.
Emeline Meaker	Murder	Vermont	1883	Hanging	Two boiled eggs, two slices of toast, a baked potato, a donut and a cup of coffee.
Carey Dean Moore	Murder	Nebraska	2018	Lethal injection	Pizza with bacon, beef, cheese and mushrooms, Pepsi, and strawberry cheesecake.
Harry Charles Moore	Murder	Oregon	1997	Lethal injection	Two green apples, two red apples, a tray of fresh fruit and two 2-liter bottles of Coca-Cola.
Richard Allen Moran	Murder	Nevada	1996	Lethal injection	Lasagna, chicken Parmesan, salad and ice cream.
Leon Moser	Murder	Pennsylvania	1995	Lethal injection	A large cheese pizza, cheese slices, cold cuts, pasta salad, iced cup cakes and a 2-liter bottle of Coca-Cola.
John B. Nixon	Murder	Mississippi	2005	Lethal injection	A T-bone steak (well done), buttered asparagus spears, a baked potato with sour cream, peach pie, vanilla ice cream and sweet tea.
Steven Howard Oken	Murder spree	Maryland	2004	Lethal injection	A chicken patty with potatoes and gravy, green beans, marble cake, milk and fruit punch, the regular prison meal of the day.
Elijah Page	Murder	South Dakota	2007	Lethal injection	Steak (medium), jalapeño peppers with cream sauce, onion rings, a salad with cherry tomatoes, ham chunks, shredded cheese, bacon bits, and blue cheese and ranch dressing, coffee, lemon iced tea, and ice cream.
Joseph Mitchell Parsons	Murder	Utah	1999	Lethal injection	Three Burger King Whoppers, two large orders of french fries, a chocolate shake, chocolate chip ice cream, and a package of grape Hubba Bubba bubblegum, to be shared with his brother and a cousin.
Paul Ezra Rhoades	Murder spree	Idaho	2011	Lethal injection	Hot dogs, sauerkraut, mustard, ketchup, onions, relish, baked beans, veggie sticks, ranch dressing, fruit with gelatin and strawberry ice cream cups.
Benjamin Ritchie	Murder	Indiana	2025	Lethal injection	"Tour of Italy" meal from Olive Garden, which includes fettuccine alfredo, lasagna, and chicken parmigiana.
Eric Robert	Murder	South Dakota	2012	Lethal injection	Ice cream.
Michael Bruce Ross	Serial murder	Connecticut	2005	Lethal injection	Declined a special meal, but dined on the regular prison meal of the day: turkey à la king over rice, mixed vegetables, white bread, fruit, and a beverage.
Nicola Sacco and Bartolomeo Vanzetti	Murder (case still open)	Massachusetts	1927	Electrocution	Soup, meat, toast and tea.
Hans Schmidt	Murder	New York	1916	Electrocution	Sauerbraten, string beans, mashed potatoes, cheesecake and coffee.
Perry Edward Smith and Richard Eugene Hickock	Mass murder	Kansas	1965	Hanging	Shrimp, french fries, garlic bread, ice cream, and strawberries with whipped cream.
Elmo Lee Smith	Murder	Pennsylvania	1962	Electrocution	Potatoes, lima beans, peach short cake and coffee.
Charles Starkweather	Murder	Nebraska	1959	Electrocution	Declined the usual steak dinner, asking for assorted cold cuts instead.
Brian David Steckel	Murder	Delaware	2005	Lethal injection	Cheesesteak, coleslaw, and a Pepsi-Cola.
Raymond Lee Stewart	Murder spree	Illinois	1996	Lethal injection	Fried perch, potato salad, coleslaw, canned peaches and fruit juice.
Joseph Taborsky	Murder spree	Connecticut	1960	Electrocution	Banana split, cherry soda, coffee with cream and sugar, and a pack of cigarettes.
John Albert Taylor	Murder	Utah	1996	Firing squad	Antacid medicine, a cigarette, and pizzas "with everything".
William Paul Thompson	Serial murder	Nevada	1989	Lethal injection	Four double bacon cheeseburgers, french fries and a large Coke.
Charles Walker	Murder	Illinois	1990	Lethal injection	Fried wild rabbit, biscuits, and blackberry pie.
Roy Lee Ward	Murder	Indiana	2025	Lethal injection	A hamburger, a steak melt, some French fries, a baked potato with butter, 12 fried shrimps, a sweet potato, chicken alfredo, and some breadsticks.
Keith Eugene Wells	Murder	Idaho	1994	Lethal injection	Whole lobster, well-done prime rib, fried potatoes, salad with tomatoes and onions and Italian dressing, two pints of ice cream, a half gallon of milk, a two-liter bottle of soda and two apple fritters.
Jeffrey Weisheit	Murder	Indiana	2026	Lethal injection	Barbecued ribs from Texas Corral and Mountain Dew.
Hernando Williams	Murder	Illinois	1995	Lethal injection	Shrimp, french fries, strawberry cheesecake and soda.
Luther Carlyle Wheeler	Murder	Mississippi	1954	Electrocution	Shrimp cocktail, lettuce and tomato salad, fried chicken, French fried potatoes, rye bread and butter, a pint of milk and a large pecan pie.
Frank Wojculewicz	Double murder	Connecticut	1959	Electrocution	Salad and caraway seed roll.
Douglas Franklin Wright	Serial murder	Oregon	1996	Lethal injection	One honey bun.
Matthew Eric Wrinkles	Murder	Indiana	2009	Lethal injection	Prime rib, a "loaded" baked potato, pork chops with steak fries, rolls and two salads with ranch dressing.
Keith Zettlemoyer	Murder	Pennsylvania	1995	Lethal injection	Two cheeseburgers, fries, chocolate pudding and chocolate milk.

== See also ==
- Capital punishment
- Death row
- Final statement
- Last Supper
- Religion and capital punishment
