= Daniel Remeta =

American convicted spree killer and mass murderer (1958–1998)

- 1985 booking photo of Remeta
- Born: January 6, 1958; Traverse City, Michigan, U.S.
- Died: March 31, 1998 (aged 40); Florida State Prison, Florida, U.S.
- Status: Executed by electric chair
- Convictions: Florida; First-degree murder Arkansas; Capital murder Kansas; First-degree murder (x3); Aggravated battery against a law enforcement officer Aggravated robbery (x2); Aggravated kidnapping (x2); Aggravated battery
- Penalty: Florida; Death; Arkansas; Death; Kansas; Five consecutive life sentences

Details
- Victims: 5
- Date: February 8-13, 1985
- Country: United States
- Locations: Florida, Arkansas, Kansas
- Imprisoned at: Kansas State Penitentiary (1985–1986); Florida State Prison (1986–1998)

Daniel Eugene Remeta (January 6, 1958 – March 31, 1998) was an American convicted spree killer who committed a total of five murders in 1985 in Kansas, Arkansas and Florida. Remeta first committed the murder of Mehrle Reeder on February 8, 1985, robbing and murdering at a convenience store in Ocala, Florida. Three days later, on February 11, 1985, Remeta and his group killed Linda Marvin during a robbery in Mulberry, Arkansas. Another two days later, Remeta and his accomplices shot and killed a gas station manager, Larry McFarland, in Grainfield, Kansas, before they later kidnapped and murdered two more men, John Schroeder and Glenn Moore, before they were all arrested in Atwood, Kansas, with one of Remeta's alleged accomplices, Mark Anthony Walter, being killed by police during a gunfight.

Remeta was charged in all three states with the five murders. He was found guilty and sentenced to death in both Florida and Arkansas for the murders of Reeder and Marvin, while receiving multiple life sentences for the other murders in Kansas, where the state's death penalty was not implemented until 1994. Remeta was executed by the electric chair in Florida on March 31, 1998. Remeta's two surviving companions, James Hunter and Lisa Dunn (Remeta's girlfriend), were similarly convicted for the killings, although in the end, they were both acquitted of all charges upon their appeals and re-trials.

== Early life ==
Born in Traverse City, Michigan on January 6, 1958, Daniel Eugene Remeta, who was of Native American descent, came from a dysfunctional family background. Remeta's parents were both alcoholics, and his father was reportedly abusive toward both Daniel and his mother; Remeta's uncles were similarly addicted to alcohol and often displayed abusive behaviour towards Remeta and his brother, even going as far as to make the boys fight each other (sometimes with weapons). When Remeta was around 10 or 11 years old, his parents divorced.

At the age of five, Remeta reportedly pointed a wooden toy gun at a police officer and struck him during one of these incidents, and during his adolescent years, Remeta was also convicted 14 times for juvenile offences. At the age of 21, Remeta was incarcerated at the Marquette Branch Prison, a maximum-security facility in Michigan, for larceny in a building. During his nearly four-year imprisonment, he accumulated a substantial disciplinary record, including charges of inciting a prison riot. George Pennell, an administrative assistant at the prison, described Remeta as a "problem prisoner" who showed little regard for rules or rehabilitation. Remeta was released from prison in September 1984, just months before he would embark on his worst crime spree yet.

== Murders ==
Between February 8 and February 13, 1985, a few months after his release from prison, 27-year-old Daniel Remeta committed a total of five murders across three states, namely Florida, Arkansas and Kansas.

Mehrle Reeder

On February 8, 1985, Remeta committed his first murder in Florida.

On that day itself, Remeta and his two 18-year-old accomplices, Lisa Dunn and Mark Anthony Walter, entered a convenience store in Ocala. Remeta first approached the counter with a package of bubble gum, and as 60-year-old clerk Mehrle "Chet" Reeder opened the cash register, Remeta shot him with a .357-caliber Magnum pistol. After Reeder fell, Remeta shot him again, then moved around the counter and fired two more shots before stealing approximately $52 from the register. Reeder died as a result of the shooting.

Linda Marvin

On February 11, 1985, Remeta's second murder took place in Arkansas.

The day before the fatal shooting, on February 10, 1985, Remeta and his companions committed another firearm robbery in Waskom, Texas, shooting 18-year-old cashier Camellia Carroll five times after they robbed and kidnapped her from a local convenience store. Carroll survived the shooting, and would later become a witness against Remeta.

The following day, in Mulberry, Arkansas, Remeta and his group killed 42-year-old Linda Marvin, a convenience store clerk, by shooting her 11 times during a robbery that yielded $556.

Larry McFarland, John Schroeder and Glenn Moore

On February 13, 1985, Remeta and his companions, joined by 33-year-old hitchhiker James Hunter (who allegedly helped commit the killings), committed three more murders in Kansas.

On that day, Remeta murdered 27-year-old Larry McFarland, a gas station manager, in Grainfield, Kansas. Soon after the killing of McFarland, a Kansas sheriff, Ben Albright, following Remeta's car noticed something was wrong and signaled him to pull over. As the sheriff approached, one of Remeta's companions got out of the passenger side and shot the sheriff twice.

Remeta and his companions then ran to a grain elevator, where they kidnapped two men, 29-year-old John Schroeder and 55-year-old Glenn Moore, and stole their truck. Shortly after, after reaching a dirt road in Colby, Kansas, both men were made to lie down and were fatally shot execution-style in the back of the head with the same .357 Magnum.

After the double murder, the Kansas authorities tracked down the group and chased the stolen truck into a farmyard within Atwood, where a shootout occurred. In this exchange of gunfire, one of Remeta's companions, Walter, was shot in the forehead and killed by Colby Police Reserve Officer Kenneth Dible (riding in a patrol car driven by Sgt. Dennis Brown), and both Dunn and Remeta were wounded in the arm and buttocks respectively by Kansas Highway Patrol Trooper Mark Conboy and Colby Police Officer Mark Eibert. Remeta, Dunn and Hunter were subsequently arrested and gradually, the investigations into the Kansas murders led to the revelation of Remeta's other murders in Florida and Arkansas, and the possible involvement of Remeta and his cohorts in other robberies in several states like Michigan, Florida, Georgia, Louisiana, Arkansas.

In response to Remeta's murder spree, many locals in the Kansas area were shocked and outraged at the murderous violence unleashed in their community. Walter's mother was shocked at the news of her son's involvement in the murders, stating that they never raised him to be a killer. Remeta's mother was similarly shocked and devastated by her son's crimes, and she reportedly offered condolences and remorse for her son's atrocities.

== Trial proceedings ==
=== Kansas ===
After his arrest, Daniel Remeta was charged with all the murders he committed. He was first tried in the state of Kansas for the murders of Larry McFarland, John Schroeder and Glenn Moore.

On May 13, 1985, merely three months after killing the three men in Kansas, Remeta pleaded guilty to the first-degree murders of Moore and Schroeder on both counts, as well as aggravated kidnapping, aggravated battery, aggravated battery on a law enforcement officer and aggravated robbery. Three days later, Remeta entered a plea agreement, admitting to the first-degree murder of Larry McFarland and aggravated robbery, provided his girlfriend Lisa Dunn would not be prosecuted for McFarland's death.

In accordance with Kansas state law, which mandated life imprisonment for first-degree murder and aggravated kidnapping, Remeta was sentenced on July 1, 1985, to four consecutive mandatory life sentences for the killings of Schroeder and Moore (two counts of first-degree murder and two counts of aggravated kidnapping). Notably, Remeta was not sentenced to death, as Kansas did not reinstate the death penalty for murder until 1994, nine years after his conviction. Additionally, the court imposed sentences of 15 years to life for each count of aggravated battery on a law enforcement officer and aggravated robbery, and five to 20 years for aggravated battery. During sentencing, Thomas County District Judge Keith Willoughby stated that the murders of Moore and Schroeder were "cold-blooded" and stated that Remeta did not show any remorse for his actions, dismissing his request for a public apology to the victims' families.

Three days later, on July 4, 1985, Remeta was given a fifth term of life imprisonment for the murder of McFarland, plus 15 years to life for aggravated robbery. The life sentence for McFarland's killing was ordered to run consecutively with the prior four life terms handed to Remeta days earlier.

=== Florida ===
The following year after his murder trial in Kansas, Remeta was sent back to Florida in August 1985 to face trial for the murder of Mehrle Reeder.

On June 2, 1986, a Marion County jury found Remeta guilty of first-degree murder for the death of Reeder. The sentencing was scheduled for the next day, and the prosecution reportedly sought the death penalty for Remeta.

On June 3, 1986, Judge Carvel Angel officially sentenced Remeta to death for the murder of Reeder upon the jury's unanimous recommendation for capital punishment, marking Remeta's first death sentence for the killing spree he perpetuated in 1985.

After his sentencing, the Florida state authorities decided to incarcerate Remeta on death row in Florida rather than sending him back to Kansas to continue serving his life sentences for the killings committed there, citing a Florida law that prohibited the state from sending condemned individuals back to another state where the offender(s) faced lesser penalties for crimes committed in that particular state.

This arrangement sparked a speculation that both the governors of Kansas and Florida, John W. Carlin and Bob Graham, would go to court to seek an approval of whether Remeta should remain in Florida or return to Kansas to serve his life terms like what the Kansas authorities preferred, given that Carlin was a strong opponent of capital punishment while Graham strongly supported the death penalty. Furthermore, the victims' surviving kin and many members of the local Kansas community where the murders occurred petitioned the governor to prevent Remeta's return to Kansas, requesting instead that he remain in Florida's judicial custody with the hope that he would be executed there for the murders. Subsequently, about two weeks after the sentencing of Remeta, Carlin publicly announced that he would not be seeking the return of Remeta for the time being, and allow the law to take its course until further notice.

=== Arkansas ===
After he was condemned to death row in Florida, Remeta was extradited to Arkansas to face a third trial for murdering Linda Marvin, where he also faced a possible death sentence if convicted of a capital murder offence within the state jurisdiction.

On May 5, 1987, a Crawford County circuit court jury convicted Remeta of capital murder. On that same afternoon, three hours after finding Remeta guilty, the same jury recommended the death penalty for Remeta, thus marking the second time Remeta was sentenced to death. After his sentencing in Arkansas, Remeta was returned to Florida to continue his imprisonment on the state death row.

=== Status of Hunter and Dunn ===
Apart from Remeta, both James Hunter and Lisa Dunn were charged as accomplices in the killing spree.

In June 1985, Hunter and Dunn were found guilty by a Thomas County jury in the Kansas courts for the abduction-killings of Moore and Schroeder. The pair were sentenced to mandatory life imprisonment on multiple counts of abetting first-degree murder, aggravated kidnapping, aggravated battery, and aggravated robbery.

Upon their appeals, Hunter and Dunn were granted re-trials for their respective roles in the murders. Hunter was the first to undergo a re-trial, and he was ultimately acquitted on January 20, 1988, after the jury declared him innocent and accepting that Hunter only followed Remeta throughout the crimes out of fear for his life. Hunter stated in an interview that he hoped to move on with his life, and still felt sorry and regretful for the victims of Remeta, while he also lamented that he lost three years of his life for hitchhiking and accompanying Remeta. However, four days after regaining his freedom, Hunter died from a heart attack at the age of 36 on January 24, 1988. In response to Hunter's death, the widow of Glenn Moore stated that she still believed Hunter to be guilty of murdering her husband, and was pleased with his death.

Dunn was subjected to a re-trial and in the end, she was acquitted of all charges by a Kansas jury on September 4, 1992. Despite her acquittal, Dunn's legal troubles continued in Arkansas, where she faced charges in Marvin's murder that could have resulted in the death penalty. However, in 1986, Kansas Governor Carlin initially prevented her extradition, a move that provoked widespread criticism from the prosecuting authorities in Arkansas. Local residents of Colby in Arkansas petitioned to the state government to prosecute Dunn for murder after the acquittal of Dunn in 1992, and a year later, after a lengthy legal process, Dunn was extradited to Arkansas in October 1993 to face trial. In December 1993, Dunn reached a plea agreement with the prosecution and admitted to a reduced charge of hindering the prosecution, and given 20 years' jail. However, since she already served 8 1/2 years in Kansas under her original life term, the time served was accounted for in the 20-year sentence and she was released after the end of her trial.

== Appeal processes ==
On March 31, 1988, the Florida Supreme Court dismissed Remeta's appeal against his death sentence and conviction for Mehrle Reeder's murder.

On October 2, 1989, the Arkansas Supreme Court rejected Remeta's appeal and upheld his murder conviction and death sentence for the killing of Linda Marvin.

On April 12, 1990, Remeta's second appeal was denied by the Florida Supreme Court.

On May 31, 1996, the 11th Circuit Court of Appeals turned down Remeta's appeal.

== Execution ==
Originally, Daniel Remeta was scheduled to be executed on March 14, 1990, but he was granted an indefinite stay of execution after a Marion County Court judge approved his appeal, enabling Remeta to remain on death row for another eight years. In his second death warrant, Remeta's execution date was rescheduled on March 31, 1998; Remeta was one of four condemned inmates (also including Gerald Stano, Leo Alexander Jones and Judy Buenoano) scheduled to be executed by Florida between March 23 and March 31, 1998.

As a final recourse to escape the death penalty, Remeta filed last-minute appeals to stave off his execution. On March 28, 1998, a last-minute appeal filed by Remeta was rejected by a state district judge. The next day, on March 29, 1998, a follow-up appeal to the Florida Supreme Court was also dismissed. Later, the U.S. Supreme Court denied Remeta's final appeal.

On March 31, 1998, 40-year-old Daniel Eugene Remeta was put to death by the electric chair at the Florida State Prison. According to reports, the father of John Schroeder, one of Remeta's murdered victims, was glad and relieved to know that his son's killer was executed, and several police officers from Kansas had attended the execution of Remeta in Florida.

== Aftermath ==
During the next decade or so after he was executed, Daniel Remeta remained as one of the most infamous criminals who committed crimes in Kansas.

In May 2013, the former lawyers of Remeta and Lisa Dunn were interviewed to speak about their experiences. Jerry Fairbanks, who defended Remeta, stated that Remeta was genuinely malevolent, describing him as the most frightening person he had ever encountered, and he regarded Lisa Dunn and Jim Hunter more as victims of Remeta's control and violence than as willing participants in the crimes. Fairbanks also said that he was personally disturbed by Remeta's behaviour.

As for Jake Brooks, the former lawyer of Dunn, described Dunn as a victim of Remeta's manipulation, suggesting that she was under his control and not a willing participant in the crimes. It was further revealed that after she was cleared of any involvement in the Kansas murders, Dunn was sentenced to a year in prison (plus five years of probation) for embezzlement charges in 1998.

== See also ==
- Capital punishment in Arkansas
- Capital punishment in Florida
- List of people executed in Florida
- List of people executed in the United States in 1998

Executions carried out in Florida
Preceded by Judy Buenoano March 30, 1998	Daniel Eugene Remeta; March 31, 1998	Succeeded by Allen Lee Davis July 8, 1999
Executions carried out in the United States
Preceded by Judy Buenoano – Florida March 30, 1998	Allen Lee Davis – Florida; March 31, 1998	Succeeded by Angel Francisco Breard – Virginia April 14, 1998
