= List of people executed in the United States in 1998 =

Sixty-eight people, sixty-six male and two female, Karla Faye Tucker and Judy Buenoano, were executed in the United States in 1998, sixty by lethal injection, seven by electrocution, and one by gas chamber. Twenty of them were carried out in Texas. Three people, Angel Francisco Breard (Paraguay), Jose Roberto Villafuerte (Honduras), and Tuan Anh Nguyen (Vietnam) were foreign nationals.

== List of people executed in the United States in 1998 ==
No.	Date of execution	Name	Age of person			Gender	Ethnicity	State	Method	Ref.
No.	Date of execution	Name	At execution	At offense	Age difference	Gender	Ethnicity	State	Method	Ref.
1	January 21, 1998	Lloyd Wayne Hampton	44	36	8	Male	White	Illinois	Lethal injection	
2	January 21, 1998	Jose Jesus Ceja	42	18	24	Male	Hispanic	Arizona	Lethal injection	
3	January 29, 1998	Robert Allan Smith	47	45	2	Male	White	Indiana	Lethal injection	
4	January 30, 1998	Ricky Lee Sanderson	38	26	12	Male	White	North Carolina	Gas Chamber	
5	February 3, 1998	Karla Faye Tucker	38	23	15	Female	White	Texas	Lethal injection	
6	February 9, 1998	Steven Ceon Renfro	40	38	2	Male	White	Texas	Lethal injection	
7	February 10, 1998	Tony Albert Mackall	33	22	11	Male	Black	Virginia	Lethal injection	
8	February 20, 1998	Michael Edward Long	35	24	11	Male	White	Oklahoma	Lethal injection	
9	February 24, 1998	Terry Allen Langford	31	22	9	Male	White	Montana	Lethal injection	
10	February 25, 1998	Reginald Love Powell	29	18	11	Male	Black	Missouri	Lethal injection	
11	March 6, 1998	John David Arnold Jr.	43	23	20	Male	White	South Carolina	Lethal injection	
12	March 11, 1998	Jerry Lee Hogue	47	28	19	Male	White	Texas	Lethal injection	
13	March 18, 1998	Douglas McArthur Buchanan Jr.	29	19	10	Male	White	Virginia	Lethal injection	
14	March 23, 1998	Gerald Eugene Stano	46	22	24	Male	White	Florida	Electrocution	
15	March 24, 1998	Leo Alexander Jones	47	31	16	Male	Black	Florida	Electrocution	
16	March 25, 1998	Milton V. Griffin-El	37	25	12	Male	Black	Missouri	Lethal injection	
17	March 25, 1998	Ronald L. Watkins	35	25	10	Male	Black	Virginia	Lethal injection	
18	March 30, 1998	Judias Anna Lou Buenoano	54	28	26	Female	White	Florida	Electrocution	
19	March 31, 1998	Daniel Eugene Remeta	40	27	13	Male	Native American	Florida	Electrocution	
20	April 14, 1998	Angel Francisco Breard	32	26	6	Male	Hispanic	Virginia	Lethal injection	
21	April 22, 1998	Glennon Paul Sweet	43	31	12	Male	White	Missouri	Lethal injection	
22	April 22, 1998	Jose Roberto Villafuerte	45	30	15	Male	Hispanic	Arizona	Lethal injection	
23	April 22, 1998	Joseph John Cannon	38	17	21	Male	White	Texas	Lethal injection	
24	April 24, 1998	Lesley Lee Gosch	42	30	12	Male	White	Texas	Lethal injection	
25	April 29, 1998	Arthur Martin Ross	43	35	8	Male	White	Arizona	Lethal injection	
26	April 29, 1998	Frank Basil McFarland	34	24	10	Male	White	Texas	Lethal injection	
27	May 8, 1998	Steven Allen Thompson	34	20	14	Male	White	Alabama	Electrocution	
28	May 18, 1998	Robert Anthony Carter	34	17	17	Male	Black	Texas	Lethal injection	
29	May 19, 1998	Pedro Cruz Muniz	41	20	21	Male	Hispanic	Texas	Lethal injection	
30	June 3, 1998	Douglas Edward Gretzler	47	22	25	Male	White	Arizona	Lethal injection	
31	June 10, 1998	David Loomis Cargill	39	26	13	Male	White	Georgia	Electrocution	
32	June 11, 1998	Clifford Holt Boggess	33	21	12	Male	White	Texas	Lethal injection	
33	June 15, 1998	Johnny Dean Pyles	40	24	16	Male	White	Texas	Lethal injection	
34	June 18, 1998	Dennis Wayne Eaton	41	32	9	Male	White	Virginia	Lethal injection	
35	June 26, 1998	Leopoldo Narvaiz Jr.	30	20	10	Male	Hispanic	Texas	Lethal injection	
36	July 8, 1998	Wilburn A. Henderson	56	38	18	Male	White	Arkansas	Lethal injection	
37	July 10, 1998	John Herman Plath	43	23	20	Male	White	South Carolina	Lethal injection	
38	July 14, 1998	Thomas Martin Thompson	43	26	17	Male	White	California	Lethal injection	
39	July 23, 1998	Danny Lee King	47	40	7	Male	White	Virginia	Lethal injection	
40	August 5, 1998	Stephen Edward Wood	38	34	4	Male	White	Oklahoma	Lethal injection	
41	August 14, 1998	Zane Brown Hill	62	53	9	Male	White	North Carolina	Lethal injection	
42	August 20, 1998	Lance Antonio Chandler Jr.	25	20	5	Male	Black	Virginia	Lethal injection	
43	August 26, 1998	Genaro Ruiz Camacho	43	33	10	Male	Hispanic	Texas	Lethal injection	
44	August 31, 1998	Johnile L. DuBois	31	24	7	Male	Black	Virginia	Lethal injection	
45	September 9, 1998	Delbert Boyd Teague Jr.	35	22	13	Male	White	Texas	Lethal injection	
46	September 23, 1998	David Allen Castillo	34	18	16	Male	Hispanic	Texas	Lethal injection	
47	September 23, 1998	Kenneth Manuel Stewart Jr.	44	36	8	Male	White	Virginia	Electrocution	
48	September 25, 1998	Sammy David Roberts	40	22	18	Male	White	South Carolina	Lethal injection	
49	October 1, 1998	Javier Cruz	41	33	8	Male	Hispanic	Texas	Lethal injection	
50	October 5, 1998	Roderick Tyrone Abeyta	44	35	9	Male	Hispanic	Nevada	Lethal injection	
51	October 7, 1998	Jonathan Wayne Nobles	37	25	12	Male	White	Texas	Lethal injection	
52	October 13, 1998	Jeremy Vargas Sagastegui	27	25	2	Male	White	Washington	Lethal injection	
53	October 14, 1998	Dwayne Allen Wright	26	17	9	Male	Black	Virginia	Lethal injection	
54	October 21, 1998	Ronald Lee Fitzgerald	29	24	5	Male	Black	Virginia	Lethal injection	
55	November 16, 1998	Tyrone Delano Gilliam Jr.	32	22	10	Male	Black	Maryland	Lethal injection	
56	November 17, 1998	Kenneth Allen McDuff	52	46	6	Male	White	Texas	Lethal injection	
57	November 17, 1998	Kenneth L. Wilson	34	29	5	Male	Black	Virginia	Lethal injection	
58	November 20, 1998	John Thomas Noland	50	33	17	Male	White	North Carolina	Lethal injection	
59	December 3, 1998	Kevin DeWayne Cardwell	29	22	7	Male	Black	Virginia	Lethal injection	
60	December 4, 1998	Larry Gilbert	43	22	21	Male	Black	South Carolina	Lethal injection	
61	December 4, 1998	J.D. Gleaton	53	32	21	Male	Black	South Carolina	Lethal injection	
62	December 7, 1998	Daniel Lee Corwin	40	29	11	Male	White	Texas	Lethal injection	
63	December 8, 1998	Jeffrey John Emery	39	20	19	Male	White	Texas	Lethal injection	
64	December 10, 1998	Tuan Anh Nguyen	39	22	17	Male	Asian	Oklahoma	Lethal injection	
65	December 11, 1998	Louis Joe Truesdale	40	22	18	Male	Black	South Carolina	Lethal injection	
66	December 15, 1998	James Ronald Meanes	42	24	18	Male	Black	Texas	Lethal injection	
67	December 17, 1998	John Wayne Duvall	47	35	12	Male	White	Oklahoma	Lethal injection	
68	December 18, 1998	Andrew Lavern Smith	38	23	15	Male	Black	South Carolina	Lethal injection	
		Average:	39 years	26 years	12 years					

== Demographics ==
Gender
Male	66	97%
Female	2	3%
Ethnicity
White	39	57%
Black	18	26%
Hispanic	9	13%
Native American	1	2%
Asian	1	2%
State
Texas	20	27%
Virginia	13	19%
South Carolina	7	10%
Arizona	4	6%
Florida	4	6%
Oklahoma	4	6%
Missouri	3	4%
North Carolina	3	4%
Alabama	1	2%
Arkansas	1	2%
California	1	2%
Georgia	1	2%
Illinois	1	2%
Indiana	1	2%
Maryland	1	2%
Montana	1	2%
Nevada	1	2%
Washington	1	2%
Method
Lethal injection	60	88%
Electrocution	7	10%
Gas chamber	1	2%
Month
January	4	6%
February	6	9%
March	9	13%
April	7	10%
May	3	4%
June	6	9%
July	4	6%
August	5	7%
September	4	6%
October	6	9%
November	4	6%
December	10	15%
Age
20–29	7	10%
30–39	25	37%
40–49	30	44%
50–59	5	7%
60–69	1	2%
Total	68	100%

== Executions in recent years ==
Number of executions
1999	98
1998	68
1997	74
Total	240

Preceded by 1997	List of people executed in the United States in 1998	Succeeded by 1999
