= Genaro Ruiz Camacho =

American murderer (1954–1988)

Genaro Ruiz Camacho, Jr.
- Born: September 14, 1954; Mercedes, Texas, U.S.
- Died: August 26, 1998 (aged 43); Huntsville Unit, Texas, U.S.
- Other names: Geno Camacho, Gino
- Occupation: Drug trafficker
- Status: Executed by lethal injection
- Convictions: Federal; Kidnapping (2 counts); Conspiracy to commit kidnapping Use of a firearm during a crime of violence Texas; Capital murder
- Penalty: Federal; Life imprisonment Texas; Death

Details
- Victims: 4
- Country: United States
- State: Texas
- Weapon: .357 Magnum
- Date apprehended: 1989

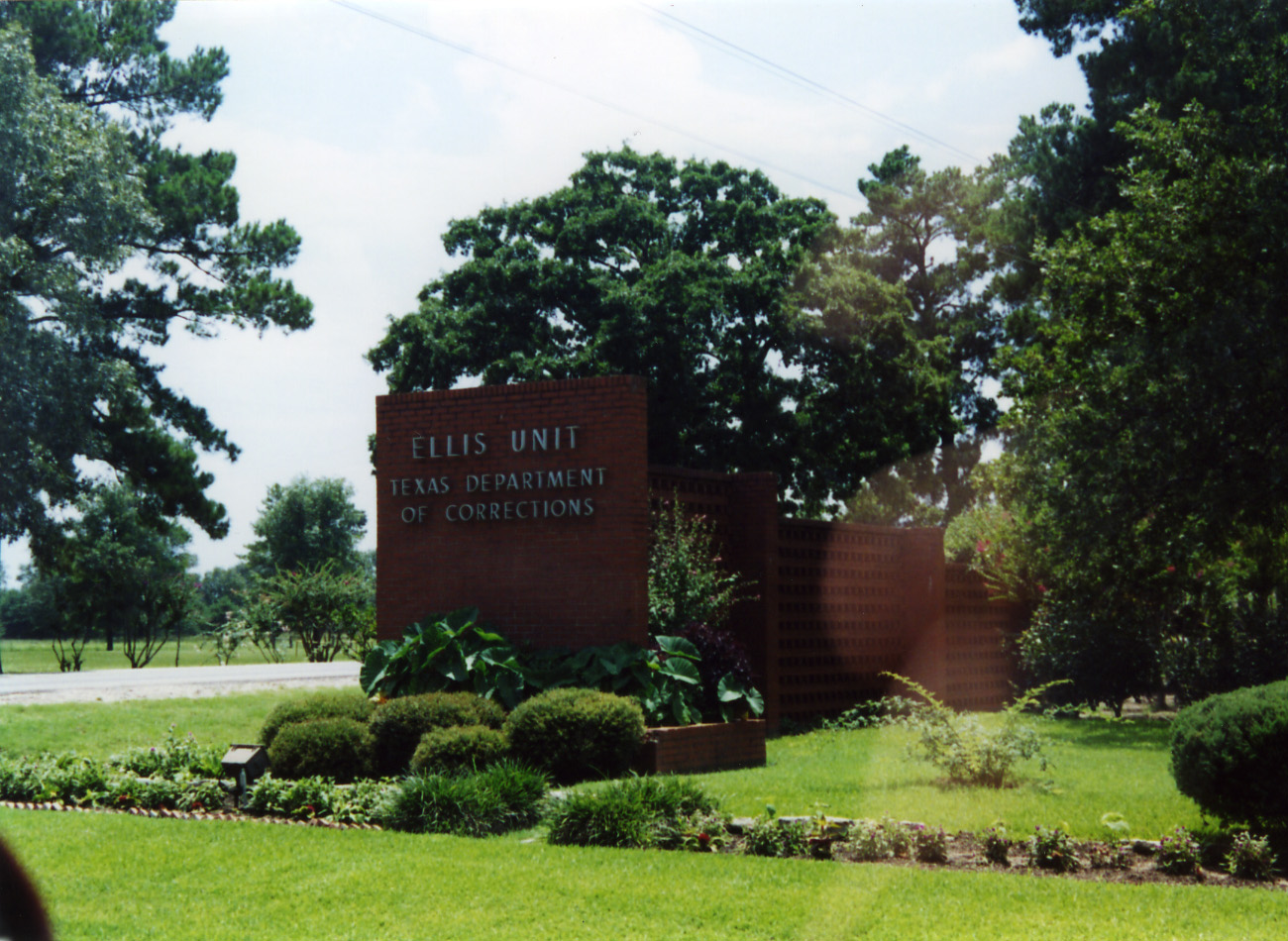
Ellis Unit, the location of the Texas men's death row at the time of Camacho's incarceration

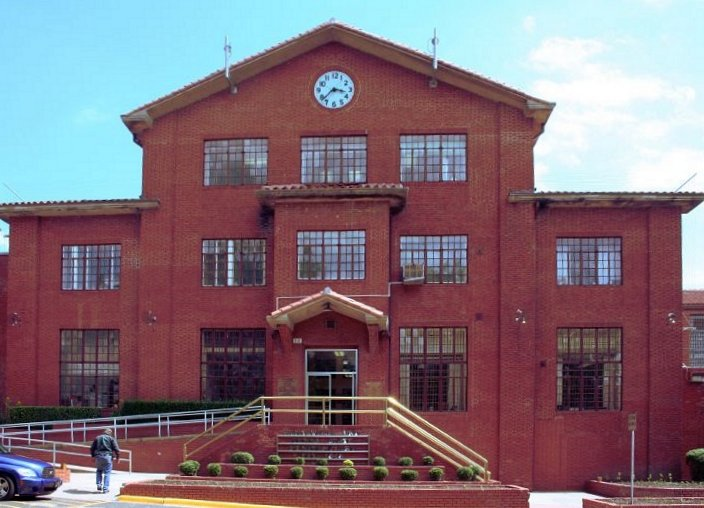
Huntsville Unit, the location of the Texas execution chamber

Genaro Ruiz Camacho Jr. (September 14, 1954 – August 26, 1998), aka Geno Camacho, was a cannabis dealer and organized crime leader in Texas who was linked to four murders and eventually executed by the state of Texas.

== Crime ==
On May 20, 1988, David L. Wilburn, 25, who worked for Sam Wright, 57, and had a mental disability, unwittingly interfered when Camacho and two accomplices tried to kidnap Wright, Evellyn Banks, 31, and Banks's 3-year-old son Andre. Wilburn was forced to lay down in Wright's home and was then shot in the back of the head, for no apparent reason. After the murder, Wright managed to escape, but Camacho and his accomplices kidnapped Evellyn and Andre Banks and killed them three days later. After this, he fled to Mexico.

The FBI learned via an informant that Camacho had escaped to the town of Arcelia, in Guerrero State, Mexico. They requested that he be extradited to the United States. Still, the Mexican authorities claimed that Arcelia and the surrounding area were under the total control of heavily armed drug lords and that any arrest attempt would result in a bloodbath. Instead, the FBI set up a sting operation to lure Camacho back to the United States. Camacho was arrested as he crossed the border near McAllen, Texas. Although the rest of his gang was sent down for between eight years and life, the District Attorney sought the death penalty for Camacho himself; arguing that the premeditation and clear intent made him a danger to society. Ultimately, Camacho was convicted of the murder of Wilburn and the kidnapping and murders of Evellyn and Andre Banks (and that of Pamela Miller, a Dallas topless dancer, the reason for whose killing remains disputed) and sentenced to death.

While on death row, Camacho was also convicted of federal charges for kidnapping and killing Evellyn Banks and her son. He faced federal charges under the Federal Kidnapping Act since they had been taken across state lines. Camacho was sentenced to life in prison on these charges.

Camacho had a last meal of steak, baked potato, salad, and strawberry ice cream and was executed by lethal injection on August 26, 1998. The execution had to be delayed by two hours, because of difficulties locating a suitable vein for the injection. Camacho leaves behind a daughter and two sons, Theresa, Genaro, and Marco.

== Media ==
The 1988 search for Genaro Ruiz Camacho was the subject of "Cracking the Cartel," episode 4 of the second series of the Discovery Channel's The FBI Files.

== See also ==
- Capital punishment in Texas
- Capital punishment in the United States
- List of people executed in Texas, 1990–1999
- List of people executed in the United States in 1998

== General references ==
- Offender Information. Texas Department of Criminal Justice. Retrieved on 2007-11-17.
