= Douglas Buchanan Jr. =

American mass murderer (1969–1998)

- Mugshot of Buchanan Jr.
- Born: March 22, 1968; Virginia, U.S.
- Died: March 18, 1998 (aged 29); Greensville Correctional Center, Virginia, U.S.
- Status: Executed by lethal injection
- Motive: Domestic dispute Rage
- Convictions: Capital murder (1 count); First degree murder (3 counts (Note: Originally 4 counts.)); Use of a firearm in the commission of a felony (4 counts)
- Penalty: Death

Details
- Victims: 4
- Date: September 15, 1987
- Country: United States
- Locations: Naola, Virginia
- Weapons: .22 caliber rifle, .22 caliber pistol, knife
- Imprisoned at: Greensville Correctional Center

Douglas McArthur Buchanan Jr. (March 22, 1968 – March 18, 1998) was an American mass murderer who was sentenced to death for a 1987 quadruple homicide in Naola, Virginia. On September 15, 1987, Buchanan Jr. shot, stabbed and killed his 43-year-old father Douglas Buchanan Sr. and 31-year-old stepmother Geraldine Patterson along with his two half-brothers: Donald (aged thirteen) and Joel (aged ten).

His subsequent conviction and death sentence led to a decade-long legal battle that culminated in the landmark U.S. Supreme Court case Buchanan v. Angelone, 522 U.S. 269 (1998). In that case, the Court held that the Eighth Amendment does not require a capital sentencing jury to be specifically instructed on the concept of mitigating evidence. After his appeals were exhausted, Buchanan Jr. was executed by lethal injection at the Greensville Correctional Center on March 18, 1998.

== Background and crime ==
=== Family history ===
According to Buchanan's defense, Buchanan experienced a difficult upbringing marked by significant family trauma. His biological mother died of breast cancer when he was young, and his father, Douglas Buchanan Sr., later remarried Geraldine Patterson Buchanan. Following the remarriage, tensions arose, and his defense claimed that Buchanan's father and stepmother actively tried to prevent him from seeing his maternal relatives. A defense psychiatrist testified that this long-term family stress, particularly the way the family handled his mother's death and its aftermath, caused Buchanan to be under "extreme mental or emotional disturbance" at the time of the killings.

The immediate trigger for the massacre was an argument between Buchanan and his father on the day of the murders. According to testimony and news reports, Douglas Buchanan Sr. made "disparaging remarks" and "insulted" Buchanan's deceased birth mother. This confrontation, following years of unresolved grief and family conflict, was presented by the defense as the final trigger that led to the violent outburst.

=== Buchanan family murders ===
On September 14, 1987, Buchanan Jr. and his wife Christianne, had discussed the plan to kill his family. They had driven to his father's house the day before the murders, but Buchanan decided he could not go through with it at that time. On September 15, they returned, parking their vehicle on the Blue Ridge Parkway, a ten-minute walk from the home. Buchanan, wearing rubber gloves, approached the house carrying a loaded .22-caliber rifle.

After arriving at the house, Buchanan engaged in the argument with his father that served as the trigger. As his father turned to walk toward the door, Buchanan shot him in the back of the head. When his father fell, Buchanan shot him a second time between the eyes. He then dragged the body into the master bedroom and retrieved a .22-caliber pistol from beneath the mattress. Approximately 15 minutes later, Buchanan's 10-year-old half-brother, Donnie, arrived home. Buchanan hid behind a door and shot him twice as he entered the house. Hearing the gunshots, Buchanan's 13-year-old half-brother, J.J., began to run away. Buchanan went onto the porch and shot him twice. He then helped the wounded boy back inside the house, where he shot him a third time in the forehead. When J.J. still showed signs of life, Buchanan went to the kitchen, retrieved a knife, and stabbed him five times. One stab wound penetrated his skull and brain, while another severed his carotid artery.

Following the killing of his father and brothers, Buchanan then waited inside the house for his stepmother, Geraldine, to return. When she entered, he confronted her with the pistol. The gun misfired on his first attempt. On the second, the bullet grazed her head, and she fell to her knees. Buchanan then used the same knife to stab her repeatedly in the chest and slash her throat so severely that it cut down to her vertebral column, severing her windpipe and major arteries.

After killing his family, Buchanan fled through the woods back to the getaway car driven by his wife. On the way, he threw his bloody shoes and the murder weapon into a dumpster. As they drove away, he tossed the rifle out of the car window. The couple fled the state and were apprehended in New Mexico on October 2, 17 days after the murders.

== Trial of Buchanan Jr. ==
Following his arrest, Buchanan stood trial in Amherst County court, where he pleaded not guilty to all charges.

The Commonwealth of Virginia charged Buchanan with capital murder under Virginia Code § 18.2-31. To ensure a conviction under this statute, the prosecution employed a complex strategy of bringing multiple, alternative capital murder indictments. This was done to counter the defense's main argument that the killings were not part of a single transaction and to allow the jury to convict on capital murder regardless of which specific killings they found to be connected. In addition to the capital charge, Buchanan was also charged with four counts of first degree murder and four counts of using a firearm in the commission of a felony.

The prosecution's case in the sentencing phase hinged on the aggravating factor of "vileness." The prosecutor acknowledged Buchanan's troubled childhood but urged the jury to balance that against the heinous nature of the crimes, arguing that his conduct was "outrageously or wantonly vile, horrible or inhuman in that it involved torture, depravity of mind or aggravated battery".

The defense strategy did not contest the facts of the killings. In the guilt phase, counsel argued that the murders were not part of the "same transaction," a technical defense aimed at avoiding a capital murder conviction. In the sentencing phase, the defense focused exclusively on mitigation. Over two days, they called seven witnesses who testified about Buchanan's traumatic family background and his psychological state, arguing that these factors made a life sentence, rather than death, the appropriate punishment.

In 1988, the jury found Buchanan guilty of capital murder. During the sentencing phase, they recommended a death sentence. The verdict form explicitly stated that the jury had found his conduct to be "vile" and had "considered the evidence in mitigation of the offense" before unanimously fixing his punishment at death. The trial court judge imposed the death sentence as recommended. He also sentenced Buchanan to four life terms for the first degree murder convictions and an additional 14 years for the firearm convictions. After being sentenced to death, Buchanan said, I'm sorry for what I did. I'm sorry the community and families involved had to have this pain. I sometimes ask myself why. I guess that's an answer I'll have to find out for myself."

=== Role of Christianne Marie Buchanan ===
Christianne Marie Buchanan, Douglas's wife, was deeply implicated in the crime. Evidence showed she was aware of the murder plot, had discussed it with her husband, and assisted in his escape by driving the getaway car. She was convicted on four counts of being an accessory before the fact to first-degree murder and for encouraging her husband in the slayings. An Amherst County Circuit Judge sentenced her to four consecutive life terms. The Virginia Court of Appeals later upheld her convictions, with the presiding judge writing, "We hold that the evidence was sufficient to show that she contrived with, instigated or advised her husband before the murders were committed".

Christianne Buchanan was released on parole in December 2015.

== Appeals ==
Following his conviction, Buchanan pursued appeals for nearly a decade, a process that ultimately brought his case before the U.S. Supreme Court and established a significant legal precedent in capital punishment jurisprudence.

On September 22, 1989, the Supreme Court of Virginia vacated Buchanan Jr's. direct appeal for one first-degree murder charge, but affirmed his existing capital murder conviction and death sentence.

In 1990, the U.S. Supreme Court denied Buchanan's appeal for writ of certiorari.

In post-1990, the Circuit Court of Amherst County dismissed Buchanan's state habeas corpus petition.

In 1992, the Supreme Court of Virginia also denied Buchanan's state habeas corpus petition.

In 1992, the U.S. Supreme Court denied Buchanan's second appeal for writ of certiorari.

In post-1992, the U.S. District Court for the Western District of Virginia denied Buchanan's federal habeas corpus petition.

On December 30, 1996, the 4th Circuit Court of Appeals denied Buchanan's appeal.

On November 3, 1997, the U.S. Supreme Court heard arguments on whether the Eighth Amendment requires specific mitigation instructions.

On January 21, 1998, the U.S. Supreme Court, in a 6-3 decision, affirmed the Fourth Circuit, holding that specific mitigation instructions are not constitutionally required.

On March 13, 1998, Buchanan filed a suit through the U.S. District Court for the Eastern District of Virginia seeking to enjoin execution based on a conflict of interest claim against the Governor. District court granted a temporary stay.

On March 18, 1998, the 4th Circuit Court of Appeals vacated the stay, reversed the injunction, and dismissed the action, classifying it as a barred successive habeas petition.

== Execution ==
In the final days, Buchanan's lawyers launched a last-minute legal challenge. They filed a petition under 42 U.S.C. § 1983, a federal civil rights statute, arguing that then Virginia Governor James S. Gilmore III had a conflict of interest that disqualified him from considering Buchanan's clemency application. The conflict, they alleged, arose from the fact that Gilmore had served as Virginia's Attorney General during earlier stages of Buchanan's appeals, meaning he had previously acted as the state's top lawyer in opposition to Buchanan.

This final appeal set off a frantic "race to the courthouse" on the day of the scheduled execution. A federal district court was persuaded by the conflict-of-interest argument and granted a temporary stay of execution. However, the state immediately appealed. In a rapid series of events, the U.S. Fourth Circuit Court of Appeals heard the case and, on the same day, vacated the stay. The appellate court ruled that the § 1983 petition was, in substance, an improper successive habeas corpus claim that attempted to relitigate issues under a new guise.

On March 18, 1998, 29-year-old Buchanan Jr. was put to death by lethal injection in Greensville Correctional Center. The official time of death was 9:09 p.m. His last meal consisted of fried chicken, sliced bread, chocolate cake, and a beverage. His final words were "Basically, get the ride started. I'm ready to go." Buchanan Jr. was the 13th person in the United States to be executed in 1998 and also the second to be executed in Virginia the same year.

== See also ==
- List of people executed in Virginia
- List of people executed in the United States in 1998

== Notes ==
Executions carried out in Virginia
Preceded by Tony Mackall February 10, 1998	Douglas Buchanan Jr. March 18, 1998	Succeeded by Ronald Watkins March 25, 1998
Executions carried out in the United States
Preceded by Jerry Hogue – Texas March 11, 1998	Douglas Buchanan Jr. – Virginia; March 18, 1998	Succeeded by Gerald Stano – Florida March 23, 1998
