= Murder of Ralph Stoudemire =

1977 robbery-murder of a gas station owner in South Carolina

- Date: July 12, 1977
- Location: South Congaree, Lexington County, South Carolina, U.S.
- Type: Robbery and murder
- Deaths: Ralph Stoudemire, 44
- Convicted: J. D. Gleaton; Larry Gilbert
- Verdict: Guilty
- Convictions: Armed robbery Murder
- Sentence: Death (October 7, 1977)

On July 12, 1977, at a local service station in South Congaree, South Carolina, two half-brothers, J. D. Gleaton (1945 – December 4, 1998) and Larry Gilbert (1955 – December 4, 1998), robbed 44-year-old service station owner Ralph Samuel Stoudemire (November 26, 1932 – July 12, 1977) before he was stabbed and shot by both brothers, who were reportedly high on drugs at the time of the robbery. Stoudemire succumbed to his injuries and died after his son discovered his body at the scene of crime. Gleaton and Gilbert were arrested for the murder a day after they committed the offence.

The brothers were both found guilty of murder and sentenced to death on October 7, 1977, therefore becoming the first two convicts to be condemned under South Carolina's new death penalty laws since it was first introduced in June 1977 (a month before the murder of Stoudemire). Both Gilbert and Gleaton were executed by lethal injection on December 4, 1998, becoming the first pair of brothers executed by the state since 1976; they were also the longest-serving death row prisoners in South Carolina at the time of their executions.

== Robbery and murder ==
On the afternoon of July 12, 1977, a pair of half-brothers robbed and murdered a gas station owner in Lexington County, South Carolina.

On that day itself, while they were high on drugs, the brothers, 32-year-old J. D. Gleaton and 23-year-old Larry Gilbert, drove around Cayce on a trip to purchase drugs, but they failed to procure drugs after several unsuccessful attempts, and thus headed toward the town of South Congaree in Lexington County. As they passed through a local gas station, they decided to commit robbery at the station for money to buy drugs.

At the time of the robbery, only the 44-year-old station owner, Ralph Samuel Stoudemire, was present at the location. Gleaton entered the station first, pretending to ask for cigarettes from Stoudemire, and while the owner was fulfilling the request, Gleaton brandished a hunting knife and demanding money. During the ensuing struggle, he inflicted multiple stab wounds on Stoudemire in his wrists and torso. Gilbert then entered the station with a gun and shot Stoudemire. The assailants fled the scene, taking a pocketbook left behind by Stoudemire's wife.

The robbery was witnessed by Stoudemire's son, who lived across the street. Stoudemire's son reportedly saw both Gleaton and Gilbert escaping the station and his father staggering out of the station while pointing at the car. Stoudemire, who was mortally wounded, was tended to by his son but approximately 45 minutes later, Stoudemire died at the scene. An autopsy report confirmed that Stoudemire sustained a single superficial gunshot wound to the chest, two superficial slash wounds to the wrists, and five stab wounds to the torso, and based on the pathologist's findings, one of the stab wounds penetrated the heart and it was sufficient in the ordinary course of nature to cause death.

== Trial of Gilbert and Gleaton ==
A day after the murder of Ralph Stoudemire, J. D. Gleaton and Larry Gilbert were arrested for the murder, and they confessed to the crime. Gleaton and Gilbert, who were arrested alongside two other men for the crime, were charged with murder. Under South Carolina state law, the offence of murder warrants the maximum sentence of death. 11th Judicial Circuit Solicitor Donnie Myers, who was in charge of prosecuting the brothers in court, was the first state prosecutor to seek the death penalty in this case after the South Carolina government restored the practice a year prior.

On October 3, 1977, at the end of the trial's conviction phase, a Lexington County jury found both brothers guilty of robbing and murdering Ralph Stoudemire. Four days later, on October 7, 1977, 32-year-old J. D. Gleaton and 23-year-old Larry Gilbert were both sentenced to death upon the jury's unanimous recommendation for capital punishment. On top of the death sentences, Circuit Judge Rodney A. Peeples also imposed 25-year jail terms for each of the men for armed robbery, and additionally set the execution dates of both men for December 12 (Gleaton) and December 16 (Gilbert), although the executions would be postponed while pending a mandatory review by the South Carolina Supreme Court.

Both Gilbert and Gleaton were among the first 20 people who were sentenced to death by the state of South Carolina between October 1977 and March 1981, after the state passed a new death penalty law to replace its previous death penalty laws, which were declared unconstitutional in 1976. The pair were additionally the first two convicts condemned to death row under the same law since its introduction in June 1977, a month before they killed Stoudemire.

== Appellate process ==
=== First appeal and re-sentencing ===
On October 2, 1979, the South Carolina Supreme Court allowed the direct appeals of both J. D. Gleaton and Larry Gilbert, and set aside their death sentences, ordering the men to be re-sentenced by the lower courts. The convictions of the pair for Ralph Stoudemire's murder were maintained by the court, and a re-sentencing trial was scheduled to take place before a second jury in February 1980.

Subsequently, on February 26, 1980, the brothers were once again sentenced to death in a re-sentencing hearing.

=== Further 1980s appeals ===
The South Carolina Supreme Court heard a second appeal from both men and on September 14, 1981, the court ultimately rejected the appeal and upheld the death sentences. Subsequently, a new execution date of November 6, 1981, was fixed both men, but the U.S. Supreme Court issued a stay of execution in light of a pending appeal.

On May 17, 1982, the U.S. Supreme Court dismissed the appeals of Gleaton and Gilbert per a majority decision of 7–2.

On May 28, 1984, the U.S. Supreme Court rejected a second joint appeal by the brothers and upheld their death sentences.

=== Annulment of conviction and restoration ===
On August 27, 1996, U.S. District Judge Charles Weston Houck approved the appeal of the brothers, and granted them a re-trial, stating that the constitutional rights of Gleaton and Gilbert were violated on the account that the original trial judge had improperly instructed the jury that the use of a weapon proved malice, given that the U.S. Supreme Court banned the trial judges in a 1988 ruling from making such instructions, which were deemed improper by the U.S. Supreme Court.

On July 29, 1997, the 4th Circuit Court of Appeals upheld the decision of Houck and agreed to vacate the convictions of both brothers, finding that they deserved a re-trial due to the jury of their original trial receiving improper instructions in rendering their verdict on both men. In response to the ruling, a group of protestors gathered outside the federal courthouse and asked for the removal of Houck due to him quashing the convictions of Gilbert and Gleaton.

On January 22, 1998, the full 4th Circuit Court of Appeals reconvened and reviewed their 1997 ruling, and subsequently, the court decided to overturn their original ruling and restore both the death sentences and murder convictions of Gilbert and Gleaton, finding that this error was harmless even though it was unconstitutional. South Carolina Attorney-General Charlie Condon, who argued to uphold the death sentences, lauded the court's decision as he agreed that the jury would have found the brothers guilty regardless of whatever instructions the judge had directed them with.

=== Final appeal and death warrant ===
On October 5, 1998, the U.S. Supreme Court dismissed the final appeals of both Gilbert and Gleaton, and soon after this, the attorney general applied to the South Carolina Supreme Court to schedule the execution dates for both Gilbert and Gleaton and another four convicts.

Ultimately, a court order formally scheduled both brothers to be executed together on December 4, 1998, while the remaining four convicts – Louis Joe Truesdale Jr., Andrew Lavern Smith, Ronnie Howard and Joseph Ernest Atkins – were slated to be put to death between December 11, 1998 and January 22, 1999. According to reports, Stoudemire's widow did not plan to attend the execution of her late husband's murderers.

As a final recourse to avoid the death penalty, the pair filed for clemency from the South Carolina governor, but in the end, Governor David Beasley refused to commute the death sentences of both men and thus denied clemency for the brothers. A final appeal was also lodged to the U.S. Supreme Court, and it was rejected by a majority vote of 7–2, with the execution procedure delayed for 15 minutes before the court issued its verdict.

== Executions of the brothers ==
On December 4, 1998, 43-year-old Larry Gilbert and 53-year-old J. D. Gleaton were both put to death by lethal injection at the Broad River Correctional Institution. Gilbert's execution was first carried out and completed at 6:37pm (Gilbert's official time of death), before Gleaton was next executed and ultimately pronounced dead at 7:16pm. For their last meals, Gilbert requested a meal of fish, cornbread, salad, french fries, pecan pie and tea, while Gleaton ordered cinnamon roll, banana pudding, cheese and orange juice.

In his final statement, Gilbert apologized to the family of Stoudemire and sought forgiveness before the execution procedure commenced; Gilbert also told his mother that he was ready to die for his crime. Similarly, Gleaton apologized in his individual last statement, but he complained that he had been punished twice for his crime, stating in his own words:

"I have served a life sentence on death row for over 21 years, and now I have to be executed."

According to reports, Stoudemire's widow did not attend the execution as a witness. Instead, she stayed outside the prison with a few supporters, wearing gold ribbons to commemorate her late husband, while her two sons entered the prison to witness the killers' executions. The family of Stoudemire had expressed to the papers that they had forgiven the men for the crime, and one of Stoudemire's sons added that both the families of the victim and perpetrators had lost a second time 21 years after the murder of his father. At the same time, members of international human rights group Amnesty International conducted a vigil outside the prison and protested against the execution.

At the time of their executions, Gleaton and Gilbert were the longest-serving prisoners on South Carolina's death row; their individual stays were each documented to be 21 years, one month and 27 days. This record, however, was lower than the 23 years and a month spent by Jose Ceja, who was executed in Arizona for an unrelated murder case. According to Richard Dieter, executive director of the Death Penalty Information Center, the two brothers were the first pair to be executed on the same day since the 1976 reinstatement of capital punishment in the United States.

== Aftermath ==
In the aftermath of her husband's murder, Ralph Stoudemire's widow, Betty Slusher, became a crime victim advocate and dedicated herself to the efforts of ensuring that the families of the murder victims get the justice they hoped for. One of Stoudemire's children expressed in a news report that his mother considered her voice as her husband's voice, and it drove her to advocate for the executions of his father's killers throughout the decades of court processes related to the case. Slusher died at the age of 82 on June 14, 2016.

J. D. Gleaton and Larry Gilbert were both the 17th and 18th persons to be executed in South Carolina since the state's resumption of executions in 1985. According to a 2017 news report, since the reinstatement of the death penalty in the United States in 1976, the executions of Gleaton and Gilbert marked the sixth double execution nationwide and remain the first and only double execution carried out in South Carolina to date. On top of this, the last double execution from South Carolina were carried out in 1962 before the brothers' 1998 executions.

At the time of the brothers' executions, a condemned inmate spent about eight years on average to remain on death row and exhaust their appeals before they were ultimately executed, although the brothers' 21-year stay on death row exceeded this average period, and based on this information, Attorney General Charlie Condon called for legislation to reduce the average period to less than five years.

== See also ==
- Capital punishment in South Carolina
- List of people executed in South Carolina
- List of people executed in the United States in 1998

Executions carried out in South Carolina
Preceded by Sammy Roberts September 25, 1998	Larry Gilbert and J. D. Gleaton; December 4, 1998	Succeeded by Louis Joe Truesdale Jr. December 11, 1998
Executions carried out in the United States
Preceded by Kevin DeWayne Cardwell – Virginia December 3, 1998	Larry Gilbert and J. D. Gleaton – South Carolina; December 4, 1998	Succeeded by Daniel Lee Corwin – Texas December 7, 1998
