= Stéphane Bourgoin =

French true crime writer

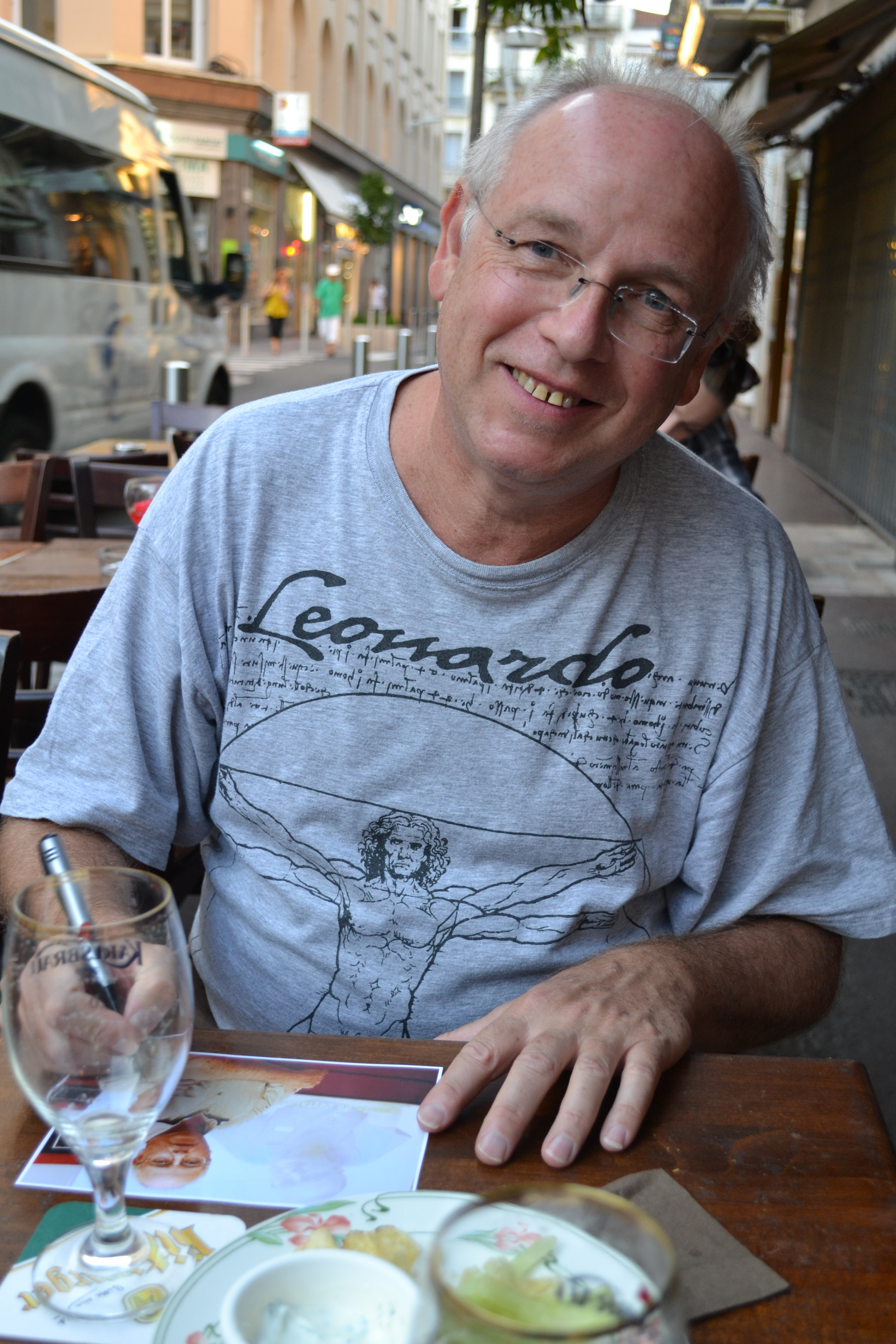
- Bourgoin in 2011
- Born: 14 March 1953 (age 73); Paris, France
- Occupations: Author; film producer; criminologist
- Writing career
- Pen name: Etienne Jallieu
- Language: French
- Genre: True crime
- Subject: Serial killers

Stéphane Bourgoin (French pronunciation: [stefan buʁɡwɛ̃]; born 14 March 1953), also known as Etienne Jallieu ([etjɛn ʒaljø]), is a French author specializing in true crime. Between 1990 and 2020, he presented himself as an expert in offender profiling and criminology and was considered as such by the French media. In 2020, after various sources revealed improbability in his biography, he was forced to admit that he lied about several elements of his past that credited his purported expertise.

== Biography ==
=== Early life ===
Stéphane Bourgoin was born in Paris on 14 March 1953, one of four children of Jean Bourgoin, a military engineer and his German-born third wife, Anna Franziska. His father was a decorated veteran of both World Wars, and a Commander of the Legion of Honour. He was expelled from high school three times and does not hold any diploma.

=== Career in B movies ===
In the 1970s, Stéphane Bourgoin was a columnist for B movies and horror films for the fanzines Vampirella and L'Écran fantastique.

In 1974, he moved to the United States where he worked as a production assistant on low-budget film productions, including a few minor pornographic films.

In 1978, he wrote three pornographic films: Extreme Close-Up, released in the United States in 1979 and in Japan in 1982 (unreleased in France), Johnny does Paris released in the United States in 1981 and renamed All American Stud when it was released on VHS, and La Bête et la Belle, which seems to have never been edited, although it might have been the most ambitious project. The ensemble was directed in two or three weeks by Charles Webb, shot with John Holmes, in Paris and Brittany, with a French technical team, established French actors including Jacques Marbeuf and Diane Dubois and a few American actresses.

Back in France, Stéphane Bourgoin became an employee of the Parisian bookshop Au Troisième Œil, which he bought in 1981. This commercial company, founded in 1973 by publisher François Guérif, specialized in cinema, science fiction and crime fiction. During the 1980s, he wrote books about genre films.

In 1990, he appeared in Group Portrait 127: Le jury du Prix Très Spécial of the Cinématon by Gérard Courant.

In 1999, he was a member of the feature films jury at the 1999 Fantastic'Arts in Gérardmer, France, alongside singer Johnny Hallyday and American actor Robert Englund.

=== Interest in stories of murders ===
From the 1990s, Bourgoin presented himself as an expert on serial killers. He claimed to have moved to the United States in the early 1970s, where he allegedly found his then-wife Eileen murdered, raped and mutilated by a serial killer in 1976 in Los Angeles. He claimed that this tragedy motivated him to become an expert on serial killers.

In particular, he claimed to have obtained an interview with the murderer Richard Chase in 1979. He also claimed to have met, in 1986, the murderer of Eileen, "sentenced to death and detained in California".

Bourgoin has written 75 books and produced dozens of documentaries, with his books selling thousands of copies in France. He was regarded as France's best known serial killer expert. He occasionally lectured police on the subject, and critiqued media depictions of serial killers. Bourgoin claimed to have provided the FBI with hours of film from his interviews with serial killers; he claimed that the FBI—grateful for his assistance—had trained him as an independent investigator.

=== Lies ===
In early 2020, Bourgoin's story was questioned in a series of videos published on the YouTube channel 4th Eye Corporation. This work was then repeated in other media. It revealed that much of Bourgoin's biography and stories appeared to have been invented or plagiarized. They published their findings in 2019, and after French media covered the issue, Bourgoin confessed. In 2020, he informed a Paris Match reporter that his oft-repeated claim that a serial killer had murdered his wife was fabricated; he apologized to his readers for the deception.

In April 2020, the site Arrêt sur images noted inconsistencies in Bourgoin's biography and, in turn, expressed doubts about its veracity. The site questions the credibility to be given to the meeting between Bourgoin and Charles Manson, as well as to an alleged career as a professional footballer. He also claims that Bourgoin appropriated the stories of South African police officers Micki Pistorius and Derick Norsworthy and FBI agent John E. Douglas.

Lauren Collins of The New Yorker wrote that "Bourgoin, in pretending to be a serial-killer expert, at some point actually became one."

==== Confession ====
In 2020 Bourgoin confessed that his supposed late wife was fictional and her supposed murder was in fact an invention drawn from the case of Susan Bickrest, murdered at age 24 by serial killer Gerald Stano in 1975.

In 2021, he told a Guardian reporter that he had in fact met only 30 rather than 77 serial killers and that he had never been trained by the FBI. In response to the scandal, Bourgoin was dropped by his publishers and producers.

In August 2024 Bourgoin was the subject of a National Geographic docuseries named Killer Lies.
