= Judy Buenoano =

American serial killer (1943–1998)

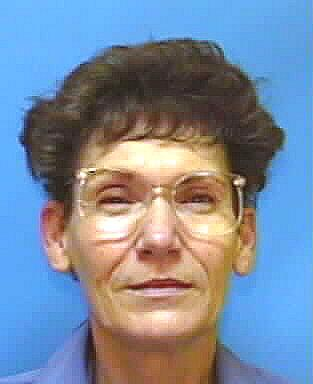
- Buenoano shortly before her execution
- Born: Anna Lou Welty; April 4, 1943; Quanah, Texas, U.S.
- Died: March 30, 1998 (aged 54); Florida State Prison, Florida, U.S.
- Other names: Judias Goodyear, Judy Morris, Judias Buenoano, Judy Goodyear, Judias Morris
- Spouse: James Goodyear (m. 1963–1971)
- Children: 3
- Status: Executed by electrocution
- Motive: Life insurance money
- Convictions: First degree murder (2 counts); Attempted second degree murder; Grand theft
- Penalty: Life imprisonment (June 6, 1984); Death (November 26, 1985)

Details
- Victims: 3
- Span of crimes: 1971–1983
- Country: United States
- States: Florida and Colorado
- Date apprehended: January 11, 1984
- Imprisoned at: Broward Correctional Institution

Judias Anna Lou "Judy" Buenoano (born Anna Lou Welty, also known as Judias Goodyear and Judias Morris; April 4, 1943 – March 30, 1998) was an American serial killer who was executed in Florida for the 1971 murder of her first husband James Goodyear. She was also convicted of the 1980 murder of her son, Michael Buenoano, and the 1983 attempted murder of her boyfriend, John Gentry. Buenoano is also acknowledged to be responsible for the 1978 death of another boyfriend, Bobby Joe Morris, in Colorado. But by the time authorities tied Buenoano to Morris, she had been sentenced to death in the state of Florida.

Buenoano is also believed to have been involved in a 1974 murder in Alabama, and in the 1980 death of yet another boyfriend, Gerald Dossett. After her arrest, Dossett's body was exhumed and analyzed for signs of arsenic poisoning. No charges were laid in that case. Buenoano was the first woman to be executed in Florida since 1848, or electrocuted in the United States since 1976.

== Early life ==
Judy Buenoano was born Anna Lou Welty in Quanah, Texas, on April 4, 1943. She was the youngest of three siblings. Her mother died when she was four, and she was sent to live with her grandparents.

Their father remarried a woman with two sons of her own. She moved to join him and the step-family in Roswell, New Mexico. She was reportedly abused by her father and stepmother, who starved her and forced her to work as a slave. When she was fourteen, she spent two months in prison for attacking her stepmother.

Upon release, Welty chose to attend reform school where she graduated in 1960. She subsequently became a nursing assistant. She gave birth to Michael, a son, the following year.

== Crimes ==
Welty first married James Goodyear, a sergeant in the United States Air Force. He died on September 16, 1971, in Orlando, Florida. His death was initially believed to be natural causes.

Two years later, she moved in with Bobby Joe Morris, a resident of Trinidad, Colorado. He died by poison in January 1978. Later that year, she legally changed her name to "Buenoano" (corrupted Spanish for "good year").

Around 1980, Buenoano's son Michael, whom she resented throughout his life because he was born out of wedlock, became severely ill, with symptoms including paraplegia. On May 13, 1980, Buenoano took Michael out in a canoe in Milton, Florida; the canoe rolled, and Michael, with no life jacket and weighed down by his arm and leg braces, drowned. Following his death, Buenoano opened a beauty salon using the proceeds from his life insurance.

In 1983, Buenoano was in a relationship with a wallpaper businessman named John Gentry. Gentry was severely injured when his car exploded in Pensacola, Florida. While he was recovering from his injuries, police found several discrepancies in Buenoano's background. Further investigation revealed that in November 1982, she began telling her friends that Gentry suffered from a terminal illness.

Authorities found that the "vitamin pills" Buenoano was giving Gentry contained arsenic and paraformaldehyde. Exhumations of Michael Goodyear, James Goodyear, and Bobby Joe Morris showed that all were given arsenic. James Goodyear and Bobby Joe Morris were found to have died of arsenic poisoning. Buenoano received substantial life insurance payouts after each death. She was arrested in 1983 on multiple counts.

== Conviction, imprisonment, and execution ==
In 1984, Buenoano was convicted for the murder of her son Michael and the attempted murder of Gentry. She received a 12-year sentence for the Gentry case, and a life sentence for the Michael Buenoano case.

In 1985 she was convicted of the murder of her first husband James Goodyear. She was sentenced to death for his murder. She was convicted of multiple counts of grand theft (by insurance fraud). She is thought to have committed multiple acts of arson (again, for purposes of insurance fraud).

She was incarcerated in the Florida Department of Corrections Broward Correctional Institution's death row for women. On March 30, 1998, Buenoano was executed in the electric chair at the Florida State Prison.

Her last meal consisted of steamed broccoli, asparagus, strawberries, and hot tea. When asked if she had any last words, Buenoano said "No, sir." Buenoano's body was cremated.

She was the first woman executed in Florida since 1848. She was the first woman in the United States to be electrocuted since 1976.

== See also ==
- List of people executed in Florida
- List of people executed in the United States in 1998
- List of serial killers in the United States
- List of women executed in the United States since 1976
- List of people executed by electrocution

Executions carried out in Florida
Preceded by Leo Alexander Jones March 24, 1998	Judy Buenoano; March 30, 1998	Succeeded by Daniel Remeta March 31, 1998
Executions carried out in the United States
Preceded by Ronald L. Watkins – Virginia March 25, 1998	Judy Buenoano – Florida; March 30, 1998	Succeeded by Daniel Remeta – Florida March 31, 1998
Women executed in the United States
Preceded by Karla Faye Tucker – Texas February 3, 1998	Judy Buenoano – Florida; March 30, 1998	Succeeded by Betty Lou Beets – Texas February 24, 2000
