= Andrew Lavern Smith =

Executed American serial killer

- Mugshot
- Born: 1960; Anderson, South Carolina, U.S.
- Died: December 18, 1998 (aged 38); Broad River Correctional Institution, South Carolina, U.S.
- Status: Executed by lethal injection
- Conviction: Murder (2 counts)
- Penalty: Death

Details
- Victims: 4 (2 convictions)
- Span of crimes: 1980–1983
- Country: United States
- State: South Carolina
- Date apprehended: June 1, 1983

Andrew "Andy" Lavern Smith (1960 – December 18, 1998) was an American serial killer who committed four murders and one attempted murder along Interstate 85 in South Carolina between 1980 and 1983. He was sentenced to death for the final two murders and was executed in 1998, becoming the 500th person to be executed in the U.S. since the death penalty was reinstated in 1976.

== Early life ==
Smith was born in 1960 in Anderson, South Carolina, to Ruth and Willie Smith. Growing up, he and his family attended Fairview African American (FAA) Methodist Episcopal Church. After graduating from Pendleton High School in 1978, he attended Tri-County Technical College and received a certificate in auto body repair.

== Murders ==
Smith is believed to have committed his first serious crime on February 24, 1980. On that day, a female convenience store clerk was abducted and raped at gunpoint before being thrown off an overpass on Interstate 85, but she survived.

At around 3:30 a.m. on July 28, 1981, a man named Henry Poore entered the Phillips 66 gas station along Interstate 85 in Anderson when he heard someone shouting. Behind the counter, he found the 22-year-old cashier, David Evan Craig of Sandy Springs, lying on the floor. Craig told Poore he had been shot, and law enforcement were promptly called. When they arrived, Craig was still conscious, but in shock and not able to give information about the shooter. He was rushed to AnMed Health Medical Center where he died a few hours later. Very little clues or suspects were located in the initial investigation. Eleven months later, on June 5, 1982, 22-year-old Nirad Jay Patel of Spartanburg was discovered stabbed to death at the Southerner Hotel in Anderson.

On May 28, 1983, neighbors of 85-year-old Christy Johnson and his 80-year-old wife Corrie visited their home in Pendleton after they failed to answer a series of phone calls. When they entered, they discovered both of them dead. The couple had been stabbed to death; Christy had sustained 26 wounds, while Corrie had sustained 18. The weapon was a six-inch knife that the killer found in the kitchen. The couples' car was missing from their home, and it was later found two miles away along Hurricane Creek Road.

== Arrest and trial ==
On June 1, 1983, Smith was arrested at his job at an Anderson restaurant and charged with Craig's murder. Detectives had discovered a November 7, 1981, gun law violation charge for Smith and the weapon he owned (a 22. caliber revolver) was similar to the one used in the murder. When investigators tested the weapon, it was determined that the bullets found at the crime scene came from his gun. At the time of Craig's murder, Smith had lived in the same neighborhood as the Johnsons, but he had moved away by the time of his arrest. He was questioned in their murders and confessed, saying that he had been motivated to do so because they would not lend their vehicle to him. Two days after his arrest, Smith was charged with Patel's murder.

Ultimately, prosecutors decided to try Smith with the murders of the Johnsons first. Despite his initial admission of guilt, Smith rolled back his statements and claimed that detectives had made his confession up. In 1984, he was tried, convicted, and sentenced to death for murdering the Johnsons. Afterwards, prosecutors chose not to move forward with the other cases, saying they "wouldn't want to waste the state's money", but the cases were nonetheless closed based on the evidence that implicated Smith. The case of a woman who was severely beaten and raped in 1980 was also closed after she positively identified Smith as her attacker.

== Imprisonment and execution ==
In 1986, Smith appealed his death sentence to the United States Supreme Court and argued that during his trial one juror mistakenly believed any person who received such a sentence would automatically be given a second trial. The court denied Smith's appeal without giving a reason. The following year, Smith won a case in the Supreme Court of South Carolina that allowed him a second trial, but he was ultimately convicted and sentenced to death again.

On December 18, 1998, Smith was executed at the Broad River Correctional Institution, with his final words being "Let's do it". He became the 500th person to be executed in the United States since the death penalty was reinstated in 1976, as a result of Gregg v. Georgia.

== See also ==
- List of people executed in South Carolina
- List of people executed in the United States in 1998
- List of serial killers in the United States

Executions carried out in South Carolina
Preceded by Louis Joe Truesdale Jr. December 11, 1998	Andrew Lavern Smith; December 18, 1998	Succeeded by Ronnie Howard January 8, 1999
Executions carried out in the United States
Preceded by John Wayne Duvall – Oklahoma December 17, 1998	Andrew Lavern Smith – South Carolina; December 18, 1998	Succeeded by John Glenn Moody – Texas January 5, 1999
