= Gerald Stano =

American serial killer (1951–1998)

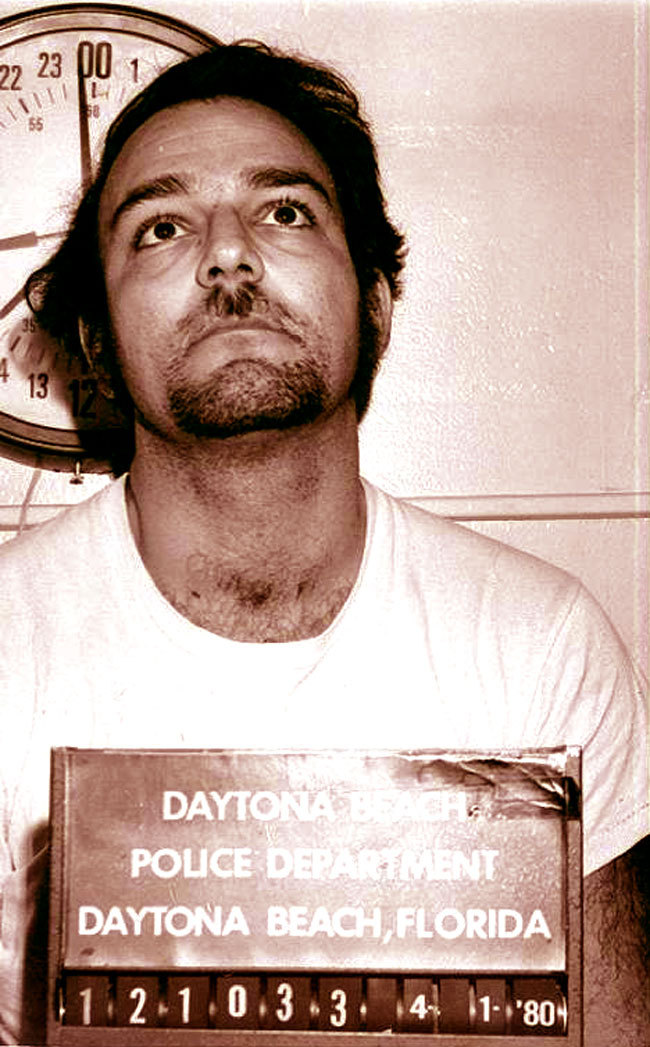
- Stano in 1980
- Born: Paul Zeininger; September 12, 1951; Schenectady, New York, U.S.
- Died: March 23, 1998 (aged 46); Florida State Prison, Florida, U.S.
- Cause of death: Execution by electrocution
- Conviction: First degree murder (x9)
- Penalty: Death plus 8 life sentences

Details
- Victims: 23 confirmed 41 claimed 88 suspected
- Span of crimes: 1969–1980
- Country: United States
- States: Florida, New Jersey, Pennsylvania
- Date apprehended: April 1, 1980
- Imprisoned at: Florida State Prison

Gerald Eugene Stano (born Paul Zeininger; September 12, 1951 – March 23, 1998) was an American convicted serial killer. Stano murdered at least 23 young women and girls, confessing to 41 murders, though police stated the number of his victims may be closer to 88.

== Early life ==
Stano was born as Paul Zeininger on September 12, 1951, in Schenectady, New York, the fifth child born to his mother, and the third she put up for adoption. His biological mother neglected him to such an extent that when she gave him up for adoption at six months old, county doctors declared that he could not be adopted. They said Zeininger was functioning at "an animalistic level," even eating his own feces to survive. Zeininger had four biological siblings who were given up for adoption. A nurse named Norma Stano eventually adopted Zeininger and legally changed his name. Despite his foster parents being described as loving, Stano continued to have behavioral problems.

In school, he earned Cs and Ds in all subjects except music, which he excelled at. He lied compulsively, and was once caught stealing money from his father's wallet to pay members of the track and field team to finish behind him, so he would not be viewed as a complete failure. During his youth, Stano was often bullied. At the age of 14, he was arrested for a false fire alarm and later for throwing rocks at cars from a highway bridge. Stano did not graduate high school until he was 21. After receiving his diploma, he enrolled in a computer school, graduated, and began working in a local hospital. Soon after, he was fired for stealing from co-workers. After moving with his parents to Ormond Beach, Florida, he was fired from one job after another, mostly for theft or tardiness. He raped a mentally disabled girl, who became pregnant. Stano's parents paid for her abortion.

== Murders ==
Stano was arrested on April 1, 1980, after attacking a woman named Donna Hensley a week earlier, who escaped a hotel room and contacted authorities. Hensley told police that she was a prostitute, and had been approached by a man requesting her services. Once at her motel room, the two began to argue and the man ended up stabbing her thirty times with a knife before insulting her and fleeing. Stano was known to Hensley and local sex workers, and she was able to identify him to authorities.

Officially, Stano admitted that he began killing in the early 1970s, when he was in his twenties. He also claimed to have begun killing in the late 1960s, at the age of 18. Several girls had gone missing in Stano's area of residence at that time, but insufficient physical evidence was found when these claims were investigated almost twenty years later, and Stano was never charged. He was most active in Florida and New Jersey. Stano admitted to committing his first murder in New Jersey in 1969. He also confessed to having killed six other women in Pennsylvania. After moving to Florida, he may have murdered 30 or more women. Most of Stano's victims were women in vulnerable circumstances, all except two were Caucasian and most of his known victims were between the ages of 16 and 25. He was imprisoned with fellow serial killer Ted Bundy until the latter's execution in 1989.

=== Victims ===
Stano admitted to several murders across Florida from 1973 to 1980:

- The bodies of Janine Marie Ligotino, 19, and Ann Eugenia Arceneaux, 17, were discovered stabbed to death in a vacant lot in Gainesville, Florida on March 21, 1973.
- Barbara Anne Bauer, 16, was found on September 6, 1973, in Bradford County, Florida. She had been abducted from a Holly Hill shopping mall and strangled to death.
- Cathy Lee Scharf, 17, was a hitchhiker from Port Orange whose body was found on January 19, 1974, by hunters in the Merritt Island National Wildlife Refuge near Titusville, Florida. She had been fatally stabbed and strangled between December 1973 and January 1974.
- On November 24, 1974, a woman's decomposed body was found lying face-down on an embankment about 50 feet behind the Interstate Mall in Altamonte, Florida. It was determined she had been killed in the same spot that her body was dumped. She had been stabbed twice and was possibly sexually assaulted, as her underwear was pulled down and her shirt was pulled up. In 1982, Stano confessed to her murder. He said he had picked her up while she was hitchhiking on the Interstate 4, had argued with her, and ended up murdering her. She remains unidentified and is known as the Seminole County Jane Doe.
- On January 2, 1975, the body of Nancy Jean Heard, 24, was found near Bulow Creek Road, just north of Ormond Beach. Her strangled body was posed and covered with tree branches. She was last seen hitchhiking on Atlantic Avenue.
- Diana Lynn Valleck, 18, was found on May 19, 1975, in an empty lot in Wesley Chapel, Florida, at the intersection of State Road 54 and Livingston Road. She had been shot to death.
- Susan Basille, 12, was last seen in Port Orange, Florida on June 10, 1975. According to Stano's 1982 confession, he picked her up as she exited a school bus after enticing her with a ride to the Starlite Skate Center on South Nova Road. Instead, he strangled her and left her body in a patch of woods, covered with palm fronds. Her body was never found and the site has since been built over.
- On July 22, 1975, a fisherman discovered the body of 16-year-old Linda Ann Hamilton strangled, drowned, and buried in the sand of a beach near Turtle Mound State Park in New Smyrna Beach, Florida. She was last seen walking down Atlantic Avenue.
- 21-year-old Emily Branch's strangled body was found floating in Spruce Spring Creek in December 1975. She had been murdered earlier that month in Florida. Stano confessed to her murder among many others in 1982.
- Susan Bickrest, 24, was an aspiring cosmetologist who had just moved to Daytona Beach from Ohio and was kidnapped by Stano from her place of work on December 20, 1975. Her case came to media attention again in 2020, as French true crime writer Stéphane Bourgoin confessed that his supposed late wife was fictional and her supposed murder was in fact an invention drawn from the murder of Bickrest in order to advance his career as a serial killer expert.
- 25-year-old Bonnie Williams Hughes was found on February 11, 1976, approximately 200 yards south of CR 546, near the intersection of 546 and U.S. Highway 27. She had been beaten about her head and face. Her 1974 brown and gold Cadillac sedan was found 50 feet from her body.
- Ramona Cheryl Neal, 18, was found in Tomoka State Park on May 29, 1976. Her body had been concealed with branches.
- Victims 18-year-old Joan Gail Foster and 39-year-old Emily Grieve were found on September 28, 1977, and October 21, 1977, respectively in Pasco County, Florida. Both had been shot multiple times.
- On October 28, 1977, 23-year-old Phoebe Winston was reported missing from her home in Plant City, Florida. She was last seen driving a 1964 light blue Ford 4-door sedan, which was recovered on March 3, 1978, off Cleveland Heights Boulevard in Lakeland. On March 27, 1979, her skeletal remains were found in an open field northeast of Cleveland Heights Boulevard and Rolling Woods Lane in Lakeland. She had been shot in the head.
- Kathleen Mary Muldoon, 23, was in her third semester of woodworking classes at Daytona Beach Community College. A school acquaintance gave her a ride to a restaurant on November 11, 1977. Her body was later found in a drainage ditch. She had been beaten and shot.
- 25-year-old Sandra DuBose was discovered on a deserted road near Daytona Beach in Brevard County on August 5, 1978. She had been shot.
- 16-year-old Christine Goodson was found dead on April 15, 1979, in Pinellas County, Florida.
- On December 12, 1979, 17-year-old Dorothy Dee Williams was discovered stabbed and beaten behind the Holiday Inn on North Dale Mabry Highway in Tampa, Florida.
- Mary Carol Maher, 20, was abducted on January 27, 1980, near the Daytona Beach Boardwalk and was stabbed.
- On April 15, 1980, a boy in Holly Hill, near Daytona Beach, discovered a human skull in a wooded area at the end of Primrose Lane. The boy took the skull home in a bag and showed it to his parents, who called the Sheriff's office. Investigators scoured the area for days, and eventually found more remains, mostly skeletonised, and some pieces of clothing. Apparently wild animals had pulled the corpse apart and scattered it. An autopsy later identified the victim as 26-year-old prostitute Toni Van Haddocks. Her cause of death was attributed to multiple stab wounds to the head.
- A young woman's remains were found in Daytona Beach on November 5, 1980, by Florida Department of Transportation workers who found the victim's skeletal remains in the wooded median strip of Interstate 95, north of the Volusia/Brevard County line. She had been murdered several weeks before and died due to stab wounds in her upper torso. Stano told investigators that he met her at a bar on Main Street in 1978 or 1979 and that he choked her to death and took her to the wooded area. Years later, he remembered the slogan on her shirt, "Do it in the dirt," an advertising slogan for a motorcycle manufacturer. No charges were filed in accordance with a plea agreement. DNA from the woman remains was extracted by Astrea Forensics for the genetic genealogy team at FHD Forensics. The investigation was underwritten by the Dean and Tina Linn Clouse Memorial Fund at Genealogy For Justice. She was identified as Pamela Kay Wittman in March 2024.

== Execution ==
Stano was found guilty of nine murders and received eight life sentences and one death sentence. He was executed by electric chair on March 23, 1998, in Florida State Prison. For his final meal, Stano requested Delmonico steak, a baked potato with sour cream and bacon bits, salad with blue cheese dressing, lima beans, a half gallon of mint chocolate-chip ice cream, and 2 litres of Pepsi. Stano's final statement proclaimed innocence and directed blame for his false confessions at the lead investigator, Paul Crow. He stated: "I am innocent. I am frightened. I was threatened, and I was held month after month without any real legal representation. I confessed to crimes I did not commit."

== See also ==
- List of people executed in Florida
- List of people executed in the United States in 1998
- List of serial killers by number of victims
- List of serial killers in the United States

== Books ==
- Flowers, Anna (1993). Blind Fury. Pinnacle Books. ISBN 978-1-55817-719-2.
- Kelly, Kathy; Montane, Diana (2011). I Would Find a Girl Walking. Berkley. ISBN 978-0-425-23186-9.
