= List of longest prison sentences served =

This is a list of longest prison sentences served by a single person, worldwide, without a period of freedom followed by a second conviction. These cases rarely coincide with the longest prison sentences given, because some countries have laws that do not allow sentences without parole or for convicts to remain in prison beyond a given number of years (regardless of their original conviction).

== Longest sentences served between 5–7 decades ==
Indicates cases where imprisonment is still ongoing.

=== More than 70 years ===
Name	Sentence start	Sentence end	Sentence duration	Country	Description
Charles Foussard	1903	1974	70 years, 303 days	Australia	Homeless French Australian confined in the J Ward mental asylum in Ararat, Victoria, after murdering an elderly man and stealing his boots. Died while still incarcerated at the age of 92, making this the longest-served prison sentence in the world with a definite end.
Francis Clifford Smith	June 7, 1950	July 8, 2020	70 years, 31 days	United States	Longest-serving prison inmate in the United States. Sentenced to death for the murder of a nightwatchman during a robbery at a yacht club in July 1949, his sentence was commuted to life in prison in 1954, only two hours before his scheduled execution. He escaped from prison in 1967 for 12 days, and was briefly paroled in 1975 for 10 months – but returned due to a charge of larceny and possession of a dangerous weapon. Smith was imprisoned in the Osborn Correctional Institution, but was paroled and moved to a nursing home in July 2020. Smith remained on supervised parole in a nursing home until his death on June 25, 2026 at the age of 101.

=== 60–69 years ===
Name	Sentence start	Sentence end	Sentence duration	Country	Description
Walter H. Bourque Jr.	December 10, 1955	January 10, 2025	69 years, 31 days	United States	Second-longest-serving prison inmate in the United States. Sentenced to life imprisonment with the possibility of parole for the 1955 axe murder of a four-year-old girl, committed when he was 17 years old. He died while in custody in 2025.
Paul Geidel Jr.	September 5, 1911	May 7, 1980	68 years, 245 days	United States	Sentenced to 20 years to life and incarcerated from 1911, aged 17, for robbery and murder. He was nearing parole for good behavior, but was then found insane in 1926 and transferred to Dannemora State Hospital for the Criminally Insane, where he was confined until 1972. He was finally released in 1980 at 86. He died in a nursing home in 1987, aged 93.
John Phillips	July 17, 1952	March 9, 2021	68 years, 236 days	United States	Convicted for the rape of a five-year-old girl. According to the North Carolina DOC, he was released on March 9, 2021, on parole. His parole ended on March 8, 2026.
Kenneth Nicely	December 22, 1958	ongoing	67 years, 335 days	United States	Convicted of killing a police officer in Arkansas. Also convicted of killing a car salesman in Kentucky. Spent six years as a free man after not returning from a furlough in 1968 before being recaptured in 1974.
Joseph Ligon	December 18, 1953	February 11, 2021	67 years, 54 days	United States	The oldest juvenile lifer in the US, Ligon at age 15 was sentenced to life without parole for murder, a mandatory sentence at the time. Ligon first rejected a resentencing and parole offer in 2016. Ligon was again resentenced in 2017 and immediately eligible for parole but refused it, pending his appeal. Ligon contends that he should be resentenced to "time served" and released, so he can cut all ties to the justice system. On February 11, 2021, Ligon was released from prison at the age of 83. He spoke to the BBC World Service about his life in May 2021.
Johnson Van Dyke Grigsby	1908	1974	66 years, 123 days	United States	After killing a man in a bar fight, he was sentenced to life in prison for murder and was denied parole 69 times before he was released at age 89. Returned to prison voluntarily, citing difficulty finding a job, but left again in 1976. Died in 1987, aged 101.
Sammie Robinson	September 26, 1953	December 20, 2019	66 years, 85 days	United States	Spent 66 years in prison in Louisiana, beginning when he was 17 and ending with his death at 83.
Warren John Nutter	February 10, 1956	December 8, 2021	65 years, 9 months, 28 days	United States	Longest-serving inmate in Iowa history. Sentenced to death for the murder of a police officer during questioning in 1956 at age 18. Sentence commuted to life in prison by Governor Herschell Loveless in 1957. He died in the hospice room of the Iowa State Penitentiary in December 2021, aged 84.
Earl Edward Thompson	March 24, 1961	ongoing	65 years, 243 days	United States	Currently longest-serving inmate in Iowa. Sentenced to life imprisonment without parole for the abduction and murder of 16-year-old Joe Dickson Jr. He is currently incarcerated at the Iowa Medical & Classification Center.
William Heirens	1946	2012	65 years, 181 days	United States	Known as the "Lipstick Killer". Reputed to be the longest-surviving prisoner in Chicago. Died in prison.
Catherine Antonovna of Brunswick	December 6, 1741	April 9, 1807	65 years, 4 months, 3 days	Russia	Imprisoned as a baby when her brother, Emperor Ivan VI of Russia was overthrown by Elizabeth of Russia. Released to Denmark in 1780 on the condition that she would continue under house arrest until her death.
Catherine Antonovna of Brunswick	December 6, 1741	April 9, 1807	65 years, 4 months, 3 days	Denmark	Imprisoned as a baby when her brother, Emperor Ivan VI of Russia was overthrown by Elizabeth of Russia. Released to Denmark in 1780 on the condition that she would continue under house arrest until her death.
Clarence Marshall	1950	2015	64 years, 70 days	United States	Longest-serving prisoner in Michigan. Sentenced to life in prison on one count of armed robbery and another of unarmed assault "with intent to rob and steal". He was paroled in 2015.
Richard Honeck	1899	1963	64 years, 44 days	United States	Aged 20, Honeck was sentenced to life in prison for the murder of a former school friend. He was paroled after 63 years and one month. He died in 1976, aged 97.
Howard Christensen	1937	2001	64 years	United States	Sentenced to life without parole for the murder of a teacher in 1937, when he was 16, along with a 17-year-old accomplice who hanged himself in prison in 1943. His sentence was commuted to 200 years in the mid-1970s. He was paroled in 2001 and died in 2003, aged 82.
Charles Edret Ford	1952	2016	64 years	United States	Longest-serving prisoner in Maryland. Ford, a black man, was convicted of murder by an all-white jury in 1952, when he was 19. He was granted retrial in 2015, citing an unconstitutional trial and continued ineffective assistance of counsel who failed to inform him of his right to appeal. He was released to a nursing home.
Michael Anthony Mayola	November 15, 1962	ongoing	64 years, 7 days	United States	Longest-serving prisoner in Alabama. Sentenced to life imprisonment for the kidnapping and murder of an 11-year-old boy, and was last denied parole in 2021.
Oliver Terpening	June 24, 1947	October 29, 2010	63 years, 127 days	United States	When he was 16, Terpening shot a 14-year-old school friend and the boy's three sisters, aged 16, 12, and 2. Prosecutors theorized that Terpening wanted to rape the oldest and that he killed the others when they surprised him, while Terpening claimed that he only wanted to know how it felt to kill somebody, and that he had found the experience disappointing. Died in prison.
Diego de Castilla	1371	1434	63 years	Castile	Illegitimate son of Peter I of Castile, imprisoned as a child in Peñafiel and Curiel castles by his uncle Henry II, and released by his uncle's great-grandson, John II. Died in 1440, aged 75.
"Old Bill" Wallace	1926	1989	63 years	Australia	Imprisoned for shooting a man in an argument over a cigarette in a Melbourne cafe. Died a month before his 108th birthday, while incarcerated in J Ward. Listed in Guinness World Records as the oldest prisoner in world history.
James Gostlin	November 5, 1963	ongoing	63 years, 17 days	United States	Convicted of the murder of 11-year-old Shirley Husted in Oakland County, Michigan. He also attacked Husted's father with a hammer and allegedly tried to kidnap and rape her mother. He was convicted of first degree murder and sentenced to life without parole. On January 30, 2026, Gostlin, who was granted a resentencing hearing since he was 20 at the time of the murder, was resentenced to life in prison without parole. Gostlin is currently incarcerated at the Lakeland Correctional Facility in Coldwater, Michigan.
Robert Kenneth Hammond	April 16, 1963	January 14, 2026	62 years, 273 days	United States	In 1963, Hammond, then an 18-year-old soldier AWOL from Fort Knox, shot, robbed and ran over 59-year-old William Edwards — an Omaha cabdriver. Hammond pleaded guilty to second degree murder and received a life sentence.
Hugh Alderman	1917	1980	62 years, 192 days	United States	Longest-serving prisoner in Florida. Escaped twice in 1919 and 1924. Moved to a mental hospital in 1927, where he died in 1980, aged 86.
Thomas Bean	July 22, 1963	March 17, 2025	61 years, 238 days	United States	Longest-serving prisoner in Nevada history. Convicted of the rape and murder of Sonja McCaskie at the age of 18 and sentenced to death. His death sentence was commuted to life without parole in 1970. Bean died in prison in 2025 at the age of 80.
Leon Tice	September 27, 1963	January 30, 2025	61 years, 125 days	United States	Last man sentenced to death in Iowa. Sentence commuted to life in prison in 1965, a month before the abolition of capital punishment. Sentenced to death for a shooting rampage that killed Judy Ellen Jackson, 13, and Randall Curtis Burtness, 2, and wounded the boy's grandmother, 45, and half-brother, 7, in June 1963.
James R. Moore	December 7, 1963	April 30, 2024	60 years, 145 days	United States	Pleaded guilty to the rape and murder of a 14-year-old girl to avoid the death penalty and was sentenced to "natural life." Also confessed to the sexual assault of dozens of other young girls. Last parole application rejected in 2019. He was granted parole in May 2022 and was scheduled to be released on or around June 6, 2022. However, as he was unable to provide a suitable residence upon his release, Moore was never paroled. He died in prison in 2024.
Booker T. Hillery	November 1, 1962	January 16, 2023	60 years, 76 days	United States	Longest-served prisoner in California history. Accused of stabbing and killing 15-year-old Marlene Miller with scissors in the small town of Hanford. Originally sentenced to death for murder but changed to life in prison in the 1970s. Appealed, was retried and found guilty again in 1986. Died in prison at the age of 91.
Howard Unruh	September 6, 1949	October 19, 2009	60 years, 43 days	United States	Mass murderer who killed 13 people and injured three in Camden, New Jersey. Recluded in a mental hospital without trial or conviction until he died aged 88.
Clifford Hampton	1959	2019	60 years	United States	Longest-serving juvenile lifer in Louisiana. Resentenced due to Montgomery v. Louisiana and paroled in April 2019.

=== 50–59 years ===
Name	Sentence start	Sentence end	Sentence duration	Country	Description
Ruchell Magee	Late 1963	July 28, 2023	59 years and 8+ months	United States	Convicted in 1963 of kidnapping and robbery in an incident with his cousin that court records say involved a loaded gun, a moving car that had been reported stolen, and a $10 marijuana deal. Because of a prior attempted rape conviction (for which he had been imprisoned between 1955 and 1962), Magee was sentenced to life imprisonment. Involvement in the Marin County Civic Center courthouse attacks led to a second life sentence for aggravated kidnapping. He received compassionate release shortly before his death.
James Earl Hinton	January 26, 1967	ongoing	59 years, 300 days	United States	Hinton is serving life without parole for the 1966 stabbing death of Pickens County, Alabama cab driver Zach Rufus Collins. Initially, Hinton was sentenced to death, but the Alabama Supreme Court ordered a new trial.
Raymond L. Shuman	June 13, 1958	February 3, 2018	59 years, 235 days	United States	Second longest-serving prisoner in Nevada. Sentenced to life without the possibility of parole for the robbery and murder of two men while he and his partner (who was the one that pulled the trigger) were AWOL from the US Navy. Set another prisoner on fire in 1973 due to a dispute about leaving a window open. Died in prison in 2018.
Michael Herrington	July 8, 1967	ongoing	59 years, 137 days	United States	Second-longest-serving inmate in Wisconsin. Sentenced in 1967 for two counts of first-degree murder and one count of attempted first-degree murder.
Edward Albert Seibold	September 20, 1967	ongoing	59 years, 63 days	United States	Seibold is serving multiple life sentences for the killing of three girls and the injury of a mother in Lee County, Alabama in 1967.
Robert Brim (AKA Robert Mertz)	1958	January 7, 2018	59 years, 2 months	United States	Killed a pregnant woman and her 3-year-old daughter, and wounded her 4-year-old son, during a shooting spree in South Dakota. Jurors convicted Brim of manslaughter since they did not want him to be executed. He died in prison.
Larry Ranes	October 23, 1964	November 12, 2023	59 years, 20 days	United States	Serial killer sentenced to life without parole for the murder of Gary Smock. He was also the brother of fellow serial killer Danny Ranes. He died in prison on November 12, 2023.
Alfred Tai	May 15, 1964	March 26, 2023	59 years, 11 days	United States	Pleaded guilty to murdering two police officers in Hawaii in 1963. Died in prison in Arizona in 2023.
Harvey Stewart	1951	1957	59 years	United States	Longest-serving prisoner in Texas at the time of his third parole in 2011. He was convicted the first and third time for robbery, and the second time for murder.
Harvey Stewart	1958	1984	59 years	United States	Longest-serving prisoner in Texas at the time of his third parole in 2011. He was convicted the first and third time for robbery, and the second time for murder.
Harvey Stewart	1986	2011	59 years	United States	Longest-serving prisoner in Texas at the time of his third parole in 2011. He was convicted the first and third time for robbery, and the second time for murder.
Hans-Georg Neumann	1963	2022	59 years	West Berlin	Abducted and shot a young couple at a lovers' lane. Longest-serving prisoner in Germany and European Union. On March 17, 2021, the Oberlandesgericht Karlsruhe ordered his release on parole at an undisclosed future date, with preparations for reintegration to begin immediately. Neumann was paroled in 2021, and died in 2022.
Hans-Georg Neumann	1963	2022	59 years	Germany	Abducted and shot a young couple at a lovers' lane. Longest-serving prisoner in Germany and European Union. On March 17, 2021, the Oberlandesgericht Karlsruhe ordered his release on parole at an undisclosed future date, with preparations for reintegration to begin immediately. Neumann was paroled in 2021, and died in 2022.
Chester Weger	April 4, 1961	February 21, 2020	58 years, 323 days	United States	Convicted for the murder of a woman in Starved Rock State Park in 1960. Granted parole November 21, 2019, though he was not released until February 21, 2020. He died on June 22, 2025.
Robert Mone	January 23, 1968	ongoing	58 years, 303 days	United Kingdom	In 1967 he shot a teacher at his old school, and in 1976 he and another man escaped from the State Hospital, Carstairs, killing three people in the process.
Terry Caspersen	September 17, 1964	May 23, 2023	58 years, 248 days	United States	Longest-serving inmate in Wisconsin. Sentenced in 1964 for the stabbing of an 18-year-old woman who survived the initial attack but died of her injuries two days later. He was up for parole in July 2021 but was denied. Caspersen died in May 2023.
Emmett James Paramore	April 11, 1968	ongoing	58 years, 225 days	United States	As part of a group who attempted to steal goods from a delivery van, he shot and killed a bakery truck salesman.
Thomas Fuller	1968	ongoing	58 years, 208 days	United States	Shot and killed five children in Coles County, Illinois.
John Mikulovsky	June 15, 1968	ongoing	58 years, 160 days	United States	Murdered his parents in December 1967.
John David Smith	July 12, 1968	ongoing	58 years, 133 days	United States	Convicted of the murder of William Straight.
Clyde Johnson	February 14, 1969	ongoing	57 years, 281 days	United States	Fatally shot a man at a party after a night of drinking in 1968. At a commutation hearing in 2021, Johnson alleged that the victim had called him a racial slur and reached for a gun.
Jesse Pomeroy	December 1874	September 29, 1932	57 years, 9 months	United States	Teenage serial killer nicknamed "The Boy Fiend", who tortured nine younger children and killed two in Boston, Massachusetts. Sentenced to death when he was 15 years old, this was changed to life in solitary confinement after two consecutive governors refused to sign his death warrant. The solitary confinement was lifted in 1917, and he died in 1932, still in prison.
Henry Montgomery	February 1964	November 17, 2021	57 years, 263 days	United States	Shot and killed a police officer in East Baton Rouge, Louisiana at the age of 17. He was sentenced to death but in 1966, the Louisiana Supreme Court annulled the verdict after finding he had not received a fair trial due to public prejudice. In 1969, he was again convicted of murder, which triggered an automatic sentence of life without parole. In 2016, his life sentence was vacated and he was remanded for resentencing. He was denied parole twice but was finally granted parole and released on November 17, 2021.
Sirhan Sirhan	April 17, 1969	ongoing	57 years, 219 days	United States	Palestinian with Jordanian citizenship who assassinated Robert F. Kennedy. Originally sentenced to death, but his sentence was commuted in 1972 to life in prison. Parole has been denied 15 times. On August 27, 2021, Sirhan was recommended parole by a California parole board. Prosecutors declined to participate or to oppose his release under a policy by Los Angeles County District Attorney George Gascón. On January 13, 2022, California governor Gavin Newsom reversed the decision, stating that Sirhan had "not developed the accountability and insight required to support his safe release" and refused to accept responsibility for his crime.
Charles Ronald Martin	May 9, 1969	ongoing	57 years, 197 days	United States	Convicted of two murders.
Robert Benjamin Smith	November 12, 1966	April 21, 2024	57 years, 162 days	United States	Perpetrator of the 1966 Rose-Mar College of Beauty shooting, where he murdered 6 people and injured 2 others. Died in prison in 2024.
Roy Anderson	November 1, 1967	March 10, 2025	57 years, 129 days	United Kingdom	Anderson killed a 20 year old woman whilst on holiday in Torquay. He was convicted of manslaughter on the grounds of diminished responsibility. He died in hospital in March 2025.
Lester Pearson	1964	October 2021	57 years	United States	Convicted of murder in Louisiana and sentenced to life in prison with chance of parole after 10 years and 6 months due to a guilty plea agreement; however, Louisiana banned parole for all defendants who plead guilty to serious crimes before 1973 due to changes in state laws which prevented him from getting a chance of parole until he was resentenced and released in October 2021.
Wyman Hall	1897	1954	57 years	United States	Hall was jailed in 1897 for the murder of a constable. He was paroled in 1954 at the age of 81 and was, at the time, the longest-serving inmate in Illinois as well as the oldest.
Norman Santiago	1969	ongoing	56 years	United States	Serving life without parole for the murder of a police officer in Hawaii.
Bobby Beausoleil	April 18, 1970	ongoing	56 years, 218 days	United States	Member of the Manson Family originally sentenced to death for the murder of Manson's former associate Gary Hinman in 1969. The Family perpetrated the 10050 Cielo Drive and Tate–LaBianca murders in a failed attempt to make police believe that Beausoleil was wrongfully accused. He was recommended for parole in January 2019, but was denied by the Governor of California.
Joseph Butler	June 30 1970	ongoing	56 years, 145 days	Australia	Butler is incarcerated at Wolston Correctional Centre in Queensland for sexual assault against minors. His sentence was subject to an order of indefinite imprisonment which mandates he remain imprisoned At Her Majesty's Pleasure "until the Governor in Council is satisfied on the report of two medical practitioners that it is expedient to release". Butler is considered intellectually disabled and incapable of controlling his pedophilic urges.
John Norman Collins	August 19, 1970	ongoing	56 years, 95 days	United States	Suspected serial abductor, rapist, and murderer of seven women in the Ann Arbor–Ypsilanti, Michigan area during the late 1960s, though only convicted of one murder.
Jerry Lee Duffey	September 1970	ongoing	56 years	United States	Originally sentenced to 1,000 years in prison for robbing and raping a pregnant woman. His sentence was reduced to two life terms on appeal.
Joe Carr	1941	1997	56 years	United States	Longest-serving prisoner in Kansas. Convicted of murder for strangling a newborn and tossing his body in the Arkansas river. Carr refused to apply for parole until he was released, aged 79.
Sheldry Topp	1963	February 2019	56 years	United States	Oldest juvenile lifer in Michigan. He was originally sentenced to life without parole for a murder he committed at age 17 in 1962 but his sentence was later lowered to 40 to 60 years due to Montgomery v. Louisiana because of his age at the time of the crime. He was also given 10 years' worth of good behavior credits which allowed him to be released in February 2019 without having to go through a parole hearing.
George Yutaka Shimabuku	1964	2020	56 years	United States	Shimabuku was convicted of three killings, including one in prison. He was transferred to Arizona from Hawaii and died in December 2020 due to complications from COVID-19.
William Holly Griffith	1915	1971	55 years, 359 days	United States	Longest-serving prisoner in West Virginia, known as "the bestial killer" and the "leading bad man" in the state. Sentenced to life for murdering the police chief who was going to arrest him and a constable during his escape to Ohio, where he was arrested. Tried to flee prison several times, the last one when he was already suffering from cancer. Died in prison.
Allen Smith	c. December 1953	September 7, 2009	c. 55 years, 8 months	United States	A former reform schooler who shot an elderly couple during a robbery north of Newberry, Michigan some days before his 17th birthday. His sentence was commuted for medical reasons in August 2009, only 12 days before his death. He died before he could be released.
James Albert Findley	February 1971	ongoing	55 years	United States	Convicted in 1971 of the murder of a 16-year-old, Findley was originally sentenced to death. In 1972, his sentence was commuted to life imprisonment when the US Supreme Court invalidated the death penalty. He is eligible for parole, with his next hearing in June 2028.
Patricia Krenwinkel	April 28, 1971	ongoing	55 years, 208 days	United States	Member of Manson family; longest-serving female prisoner in US penal history.
Tex Watson	October 21, 1971	ongoing	55 years, 32 days	United States	Second-in-command of the Manson Family and leader in the Cielo Drive and Tate–LaBianca murders.
Antonio "Tony" Wheat	November 1, 1965	November 11, 2020	55 years, 10 days	United States	The longest-serving prisoner in Washington state, a US Air Force airman originally sentenced to death for the murders of three gas station attendants during an armed robbery spree with another colleague. His sentence was stayed four days before his scheduled execution on July 11, 1969, then changed to three life sentences after a retrial in 1971. Paroled.
András Toma	1945	2000	55 years	Soviet Union	Believed to be the last POW of World War II. Toma, a Hungarian soldier, was captured in southern Poland in 1945 and later interned in a mental hospital of rural Kotelnich, in Russia. His documents were lost, and he was listed as KIA by the Hungarian Army. He was returned to Hungary after a Czech linguist realized that he spoke an eastern dialect of the Hungarian language. Died in 2004, aged 79.
András Toma	1945	2000	55 years	Russia	Believed to be the last POW of World War II. Toma, a Hungarian soldier, was captured in southern Poland in 1945 and later interned in a mental hospital of rural Kotelnich, in Russia. His documents were lost, and he was listed as KIA by the Hungarian Army. He was returned to Hungary after a Czech linguist realized that he spoke an eastern dialect of the Hungarian language. Died in 2004, aged 79.
John Straffen	1952	2007	55 years	United Kingdom	Multiple child killer. Sentenced to death for his third murder, which took place after he escaped from a mental hospital; the sentence was commuted to life in prison. Longest-serving prisoner in the United Kingdom at the time of his death.
Frank Edward Wetzel	1957	2012	55 years	United States	Sentenced to two life sentences for the murders of two highway patrolmen when he was driving to Mississippi to break his brother out of death row. His brother was executed two months later. Wetzel maintained his innocence and died of Alzheimer's disease when he was 90 years old, still in prison.
Clarence Shepherd	1965	2020	55 years	United States	Shepherd was serving life without parole for separate murders, including the 1965 stabbing and strangulation of a Birmingham woman. He died in prison at the age of 80 due to COVID-19.
Carlos Eduardo Robledo Puch	1972	ongoing	54 years, 291 days	Argentina	Serial killer. Longest-serving prisoner in South America.
Earl Perry	June 11, 1943	March 23, 1998	54 years, 286 days	United States	Convicted of the April 1943 rape and strangulation of Theresa "Chi-Chi" Williams, age 4. Perry, who was 17 when he committed the murder, was sentenced to life in prison on June 11, 1943. He was denied parole in 1958, 1963, 1968 and 1974. Died in prison on March 23, 1998.
Garold Rheinschmidt	August 20, 1960	May 1, 2015	54 years, 267 days	United States	Longest-serving prisoner in Wisconsin at the time of his death.
Verdell Miles	April 27, 1967	December 14, 2021	54 years, 231 days	United States	Inmate in Wisconsin who was sentenced in 1967. Paroled on December 14, 2021.
Richard Robles	December 1, 1965	May 21, 2020	54 years, 172 days	United States	Perpetrator of the Career Girls Murders. He was paroled in May 2020 as per the New York Department of Corrections.
Bruce M. Davis	April 21, 1972	September 11, 2026	54 years, 143 days	United States	Member of the Manson Family involved in the murders of Hinman and Donald Shea. He was recommended for parole in 2010, 2012, 2014, and 2017; every time the sitting Governor ordered a review or reversed the decision. Died in prison.
Julia Belle Rollins	August 2, 1972	ongoing	54 years, 112 days	United States	Convicted of murder for shooting a 24-year-old woman in a bar.
Tony Rawlins	December 28, 1955	April 17, 2010	54 years, 110 days	Australia	Convicted of the "Kissing Point mutilation murder", strangling a 12-year-old girl who rejected his advances. Was Australia's longest-serving prisoner when he died, with 18 parole applications being rejected.
Willie Gaines Smith	1960	2014	54 years, 105 days	United States	Longest-serving prisoner in Kentucky. Rejected parole because no nursing home accepted him and he would receive better medical care in prison but was released on medical parole in 2014. Died at the age of 76 in December 2014.
Arthur Norman Duncan	June 3, 1970	August 13, 2024	54 years, 68 days	United Kingdom	Convicted of murder and rape in England when he was 18 in 1970, before later being transferred to Scotland. Died in prison at the age of 72.
Louis Mitchell	1967	October 5, 2021	54 years	United States	Imprisoned for raping a white woman, a crime which Mitchell said he did not do and has always maintained his innocence about. Sentenced to life in prison and resentenced and released on October 5, 2021.
Machal Lalung	1951	2005	54 years	India	Originally arrested for "causing grievous harm," Lalung was interned in a psychiatric hospital until he was declared "fully fit" in 1967. However, he was mistakenly transferred to prison rather than released, and forgotten about until 2005. He was released without ever being tried or convicted, aged 77.
Robert Stroud	1909	1963	54 years	United States	Known as "the Birdman of Alcatraz" for the research on bird diseases that he conducted alone in his cell, although he actually did it at Leavenworth Penitentiary before he was moved to the federal prison in Alcatraz Island.
Daniel Wheeler	March 1971	April 2025	54 years	United States	Originally sentenced to life without parole for murdering his 16-year-old pregnant ex-girlfriend in 1970 when he was 17. Resentenced and released in April 2025.
Jerry Lee Hansen	May 20, 1965	May 11, 2019	53 years, 356 days	United States	Longest-serving prisoner in Nebraska. Jailed for the murder of his parents in law and the attempted murder of his then wife. Disarmed a corrections officer and shot his ex-wife a second time in 1973, paralyzing her for which he received two 20 years to life sentences, he had been eligible for parole since 1977 and had been turned down, time after time. Committed suicide at the age of 82 while in the Tecumseh State Correctional Institution.
Michael Wilber Wade	October 28, 1966	September 2, 2020	53 years, 311 days	United States	When he was 19, he killed a 16-year-old girl he had met that day. The death penalty was a common sentence for murder in Florida at the time, but the jury spared him. Died in prison.
George Nassar	June 26, 1965	December 3, 2018	53 years, 161 days	United States	Convicted of two murders, he was originally sentenced to death in 1965, but in 1966 his sentence was struck down and replaced with life imprisonment. Also known for being the person to whom Albert DeSalvo allegedly confessed to being the Boston Strangler in late 1965.
Edward Arthur Webb	October 22, 1963	January 19, 2017	53 years, 89 days	United Kingdom	Beat a woman to death with an axe. Died in prison.
Harry Hebard	October 4, 1968	December 24, 2021	53 years, 81 days	United States	Murdered five of his relatives, including three children, in 1963. Died in prison.
John Veltre Jr	September 17, 1973	ongoing	53 years, 66 days	United States	Sentenced to life without parole for the murder of two baby girls and the rape of their mother when he was 16.
Larry Hoover	September 21, 1973	ongoing	53 years, 62 days	United States	Founder of the street gang Gangster Disciples, arrested in 1973 and was 200-year sentenced for running multiple murders, drug trafficking, money laundering and extortion both street both from prison
Giulio d'Este	1506	1559	53 years	Ferrara	Illegitimate son of Ercole I d'Este, duke of Ferrara. Organized a failed plot aimed at eliminating his half-brothers duke Alfonso I d'Este and cardinal Ippolito d'Este. Sentenced to death, his penalty was commuted to life imprisonment. Freed by his grandnephew Alfonso II d'Este in 1559 at the age of 81.
Edmund Kemper	November 8, 1973	ongoing	53 years, 14 days	United States	Serial killer convicted of murdering eight women, including his mother. He was previously institutionalized as a juvenile for murdering his grandparents.
Peter Woodcock	1957	2010	52 years, 328 days	Canada	Declared not guilty by reason of insanity and isolated in a mental hospital for the murder of three young children. Murdered a fellow patient in 1991. Died in 2010.
Wayne Coleman	January 24, 1974	ongoing	52 years, 302 days	United States	Sentenced to six consecutive terms of life with parole for his role in the Alday family murders.
Peter Antonovich of Brunswick	March 30, 1745	January 13, 1798	52 years, 289 days	Russia	Born in captivity after his brother, Emperor Ivan VI of Russia was overthrown by Elizabeth of Russia. Released in 1780 to Denmark on the condition that he would live under house arrest until his death.
Peter Antonovich of Brunswick	March 30, 1745	January 13, 1798	52 years, 289 days	Denmark	Born in captivity after his brother, Emperor Ivan VI of Russia was overthrown by Elizabeth of Russia. Released in 1780 to Denmark on the condition that he would live under house arrest until his death.
John Joseph Kenny	June 18, 1974	52 years, 157 days	ongoing	Ireland	Bludgeoned an elderly woman with a candlestick during a break-in, when he was 19 years old. He has been allowed outside prison several times and returned every single one after breaching the terms of his release.
Elmer Wayne Henley	July 16, 1974	52 years, 129 days	ongoing	United States	Accomplice of serial killer Dean Corll in the Houston Mass Murders, found guilty of committing seven of them. The crimes were discovered when Henley shot Corll in self defence.
Marie Scott	1973	January , 2026	52 years	United States	
Alfred "Alf" Vincent	1968	February 18, 2021	52 years	New Zealand	Man held in preventive prison for the longest time in the world: sentence was imposed for assaulting five boys. Suspected of having molested between 200 and 500 children. He was held in Rimutaka Prison's high-dependency unit due to suffering from dementia and a heart condition. He was released in February 2021.
William MacDonald	May 1963	May 12, 2015	52 years	Australia	English-born serial killer known as "the Sydney Mutilator." Oldest and longest-serving prisoner in New South Wales at the time of his death.
Jimmy Ennis	November 9, 1964	2016	52 years	Ireland	Longest held prisoner in Ireland. Sentenced to life in prison for fatally bludgeoning a farmer in County Cork following a dispute. He had just finished a prison term for attacking a woman with a hatchet. He refused to apply for release until he was freed in 2016, aged 87.
James Ryan O'Neill	February 1975	ongoing	51 years, 294 days	Australia	Suspected serial killer serving a life sentence in Tasmania for one murder. Allegations have been made that O'Neill also murdered a number of other children in several Australian states from the mid-1960s whilst he was still a teenager. He is currently Tasmania's longest-serving prisoner for a single offence.
Winston Moseley	July 7, 1964	March 28, 2016	51 years, 291 days	United States	Murderer of Kitty Genovese. Died in prison.
Earl David Inge	April 1975	ongoing	51 years, 235 days	United States	Inge had tried to break into a home but was chased off, one of the occupants identifying him as the would be burglar. Two weeks later he returned to the house and shot through a window, killing a man. Inge was up for parole in 2020 but was denied. He was last denied parole in 2023.
John McHugh	May 1975	ongoing	51 years, 205 days	United Kingdom	Jailed for the violent murder of a waiter.
Richard Laurence Marquette	June 11, 1975	ongoing	51 years, 164 days	United States	Serving life in prison without parole in Oregon for the murder of Betty Wilson, whose remains were discovered in April 1975. He previously served 11 years in prison for the murder of Joan Caudle, whose remains were discovered on June 8, 1961, before receiving parole in 1973. He also spent a year in jail for robbing a Portland gas station in August 1957.
Staf Van Eyken	1974	ongoing	51 years	Belgium	Convicted for 3 murders.
Patrick Mackay	November 1, 1975	ongoing	51 years, 21 days	United Kingdom	Serial killer who confessed to murdering 11 people in London and Kent from 1974 to 1975. Mackay is currently considered for release after reportedly spending time in an open prison. However, in June 2020, the hearing of the Parole Board was postponed amidst a fresh investigation into Mackay's involvement in unsolved murders.
Ian Brady	1966	2017	51 years, 10 days	United Kingdom	Perpetrator of the Moors murders together with his girlfriend, Myra Hindley, who died in prison in 2002. Longest-serving prisoner in the United Kingdom at the time of his death.
Zhang Xueliang	1937	1988	51 years	(Taiwan) Republic of China	Placed under house arrest after having been found guilty of insubordination for his role in the Xi'an Incident. He was taken to Taiwan after the Nationalist defeat in the Chinese Civil War, where he continued under arrest until the death of Chiang's son Chiang Ching-kuo, and he was released. Died in 2001 at the age of 100.
Walter B. Kelbach	1967	2018	51 years	United States	Spree killer who murdered five people and raped two women in Utah in December 1966 with his cousin Myron Lance. Kelbach died in August 2018 of natural causes.
Theo H.	1960	2011	51 years	Netherlands	Involuntarily committed when he was 17 after a sex offense in which the victim was a minor. He relapsed twice while on leave, in 1967 and in 1985. Died in 2018.
Sam Glass	1967	2018	51 years	United Kingdom	He was ordered to be detained indefinitely in 1967 after he indecently assaulted, stabbed and strangled a five-year-old girl.
David Brault	1969	July 13, 2020	51 years	Canada	Was convicted in 1969 of the shooting deaths of two men, as well as two sexual assaults and several other offences.
Willie Ingram	1970	2021	51 years	United States	Convicted of armed robbery and aggravated rape in 1970, he spent 51 years in prison in Louisiana, before being released in 2021.
Allan Baker	November 13, 1975	ongoing	51 years, 9 days	Australia	Baker is incarcerated at Clarence Correctional Centre in New South Wales for the murder of Ian Lamb as well as the abduction, rape and torture of Virginia Morse (who he had thereafter murdered across the state border) in November 1973. He was sentenced on 20 June 1974 to life without the possibility of parole.
Carl Macedonio	June 12, 1972	April 25, 2023	50 years, 317 days	United States	Raped and murdered an 18-year-old woman in New York in 1971. He was sentenced in 1972 to 33 years to life, and was paroled in April 2023.
Sarah Isabel "Cindy" White	May 10, 1976	Ongoing	50 years, 196 days	United States	Sentenced to not less than five years nor more than twenty years for arson and six consecutive live sentences for felony murder of the Roberson family, Charles (45), Carole (41), Michael (7), Dale (6), Gary (5), and Sissy (4). She is the longest serving female inmate in Indiana history.
John Shaw	26 September 1976	ongoing	50 years, 57 days	Ireland	English double murderer. Together with another Englishman, Geoffrey Evans, Shaw planned on travelling around Ireland in the autumn of 1976, killing a woman every week. The pair were arrested after abducting, raping and murdering two young Irish women. Evans died in prison in 2012.
Bobby Gene Griffin	May 27, 1968	June 6, 2018	50 years, 10 days	United States	Juvenile lifer in the state of Michigan who at the age of 16 along with three other male teens forced their way into Minnie Peapples' Benton Harbor home seeking money. Griffin beat, stabbed and sexually assaulted Peapples, who bled to death after the teens fled for which Griffin was sentenced to life without parole until he was resentenced on July 10, 2017, to 40 to 60 years and he was paroled on June 6, 2018.
John Weber	1926	1976	50 years	United States	Originally an immigrant from Austria-Hungary, Weber was sentenced to life in prison without parole for the fatal shooting of his 18-month old daughter, which he served in Columbus' Ohio Penitentiary. In 1972, Governor John J. Gilligan commuted his sentence to murder in the second degree. This made him eligible for parole, but he never benefited from it. Was the oldest prisoner in the United States at the time of his death, only a few months from his 100th birthday.
Hugo Pinell	1965	August 12, 2015	50 years	United States	Nicaraguan national sentenced to life in prison for rape. Released on August 12, 2015
John Franzese	March 1967	June 23, 2017	50 years	United States	Italian-American mobster of the Colombo crime family who was sentenced to 50 years in prison for masterminding several bank robberies. He broke parole and was returned to jail six times, the last time when he was 92 years old. At the time of his release at the age of 100, he was the oldest federal prisoner in the United States and the only centenarian ever.
James Ferguson	1969	2019	50 years	United Kingdom	Serial child rapist who was detained in Carstairs State Hospital for fifty years.
Gloria Williams	1971	January 25, 2022	50 years	United States	Williams and several others robbed a grocery store with a toy gun and, after a struggle with the store owner, who was armed, someone in her group shot the owner with his own gun. Williams was paroled in January 2022.

== Longest spells in solitary confinement ==
The sentence duration refers to the time spent in solitary confinement, but only for between 20 and 49 years. Death row prisoners, who are usually also held in isolation, are excluded.

=== More than 40 years ===
Name	Sentence start	Sentence end	Sentence duration	Country	Description
Marcel Barbeault	December 14, 1976	ongoing	49 years, 343 days	France	French serial killer at Nogent-sur-Oise who was known as "The Shadow Killer" since he murdered at night to then vanished without being seen. In 1976, Barbeault was arrested and received life imprisonment after ballistics matched the bullets from his shotgun to those used in 8 murders and 3 wounds committed between 1969–1976. Barbeault is also one of the longest-serving prisoners in France.
Domenico Papalia	March 8, 1977	July 17, 2026	49 years, 131 days	Italy	Boss of the Ndrangheta in Calabrian village of Platì, arrested in 1977 and given two life sentences for ordering two murders, including of prison educator Umberto Mormile in 1990 while incarcerated. Papalia was released in 2026.
Walerian Łukasiński	1822	1868	46 years	Congress Poland	Polish military officer suspected of harboring anti-Russian sentiments: he was kept in prison even after completing his original sentence of 14 years as a security risk.
Walerian Łukasiński	1822	1868	46 years	Russia	Polish military officer suspected of harboring anti-Russian sentiments: he was kept in prison even after completing his original sentence of 14 years as a security risk.
Hugo Pinell	1969	2015	46 years	United States	Sentenced to life imprisonment in 1965 for raping a woman in San Francisco. Placed in solitary confinement and transferred to Folsom State Prison, after attacking a prison guard and other violent offenses. Murdered by another inmate two weeks after his solitary confinement was lifted in 2015.
Mark David Chapman	December 8, 1980	ongoing	45 years, 349 days	United States	Placed in solitary confinement for his own safety after being arrested for the murder of John Lennon on December 8, 1980. Chapman was sentenced to life imprisonment, and has had 14 parole applications rejected.
Joseph-Thomas Recco	January 19, 1980	November 20, 2025	45 years, 305 days	France	French serial killer and armed robber sentenced to life imprisonment plus 18 years in preventative detention for the Béziers and Carqueirannen massacres committed while on parole.
Pierre-Just Marny	October 19, 1965	August 7, 2011	45 years, 292 days	France	French theft who received life imprisonment for killing 3 guiltless and injuring 4 during a gunfight against his former accomplices who refused to share their robbery profits with Marny. Marny hung himself to death in 2011, aged 68.
Robert Stroud	March 26, 1916	January 18, 1959	42 years, 298 days	United States	Placed in solitary confinement for murdering a prison guard at USP Leavenworth. Originally sentenced to death in 1918, but his death sentence was commuted to life without parole. Died in prison in 1963.
Albert Woodfox	January 12, 1974	February 19, 2016	42 years, 38 days	United States	Placed in solitary confinement for the murder of a corrections officer at the Louisiana State Penitentiary. In 2014, Woodfox's conviction was overturned by the US Court of Appeals. He was released unconditionally on February 19, 2016
Robert Maudsley	1983	ongoing	42 years	United Kingdom	Serial killer imprisoned in 1977; he was placed in a specially built solitary cell after killing three other prisoners.
Raffaele Cutolo	May 15, 1979	February 17, 2021	41 years, 278 days	Italy	Boss and founder of the NCO, a Neapolitan Mafia linked with Camorra. Cutolo was arrested in 1979, and given four life sentences plus 50 years under the 41-bis regime. Also had priors for forgery of psychiatric tests, two prison escapes, murder while in prison, and an attempted extortion on the Italian government. He died in 2021 in Parma prison by oral sepsis as consequence of pneumonia, aged 79.
Giuseppe Calò	March 29, 1985	ongoing	41 years, 238 days	Italy	Palermo boss of the Sicilian Mafia with politician-financial links in Rome. Calò was arrested in 1985, and given 12 life sentences plus 23 years under the harsh 41-bis regime for having ordered the Train 904 bombing, mafia association, and money laundering.
Antonio Rotolo	March 29, 1985	ongoing	41 years, 238 days	Italy	Palermo boss of the Sicilian Mafia at Pagliarelli neighborhood who managed heroin trafficking with Calò, with whom he was arrested in 1985. He was given two life sentences plus 31 years for multiple murders, mafia association and drug trafficking both Maxi-Trial (1986) both Operation Gotha (2006).
Woo Yong-gak	1958	1999	41 years	South Korea	Captured during a North Korean commando raid after the armistice. Released to North Korea in 2000.
Herman Wallace	January 12, 1974	October 1, 2013	39 years, 262 days	United States	Placed in solitary confinement for the murder of the same corrections officer as Woodfox. Released in 2013, when he had advanced liver cancer, but was re-indicted two days later. Died the next day before he could be arrested.

=== 30–39 years ===
Name	Sentence start	Sentence end	Sentence duration	Country	Description
Freddy Horion	October 19, 1987	ongoing	39 years, 34 days	Belgium	Thief who was rearrested day after escaping prison where he served life imprisonment for having slaughtered a car dealer named Roland Steyaert and his five relatives during a violent robbery in 1979.
Thomas Silverstein	October 22, 1983	May 11, 2019	35 years, 201 days	United States	Called "America's most isolated man." Placed in solitary confinement for the murder of two inmates and a guard during a prison riot. Died on May 11, 2019.
Vittorio Amuso	July 29, 1991	ongoing	35 years, 116 days	United States	Paranoiac boss of Lucchese crime family, caught in July 1991 after 14 months on the run. Amuso's paranoia caused that his trustworthy men turned witness and as consequence, Vic Amuso received life imprisonment without parole in 1992 for racketeering and nine murders.
Dandeny Muñoz Mosquera	September 25, 1991	ongoing	35 years, 58 days	United States	Colombian hitman on Pablo Escobar's orders. Muñoz was arrested in September 1991 at Queens, New York after five months escaping from La Modelo prison at Bogotá when the Medellin Cartel was falling. Muñoz received 10 life sentences plus 51 years without parole for Avianca Flight 203 bombing, drug trafficking, racketeering and forgery.
Rémy Roy	November 28, 1991	ongoing	34 years, 359 days	France	French serial killer sentenced to life plus 18 years in preventative detention for having murdered three gay men between 1990 and 1991. He was arrested in November 1991, one month after attempting to murder a fourth gay man.
Victor Orena	April 4, 1992	ongoing	34 years, 232 days	United States	Acting boss of Colombo crime family, caught in 1992 after 4 months hiding from federal investigation about the Third Colombo War. Orena was given 3 life sentences plus 85 years for multiple murders and racketeering.
Carmine Persico	February 15, 1985	March 7, 2019	34 years, 20 days	United States	Boss of the Colombo crime family from 1972 until his death in 2019. Persico was caught in 1985 after 5 months on the run and 139-year sentenced in 1987 for racketeering. He died in 2019 at Duke University Medical Center in Durham, North Carolina.
Carlos Lehder	February 4, 1987	June 15, 2020	33 years, 133 days	United States	Colombian drug lord and co-founder on Medellin Cartel famous for running a cocaine transport empire on Norman's Cay at Bahamas. Lehder was caught in February 1987 after 2 years on run and extradited to USA. He was 55-year sentenced for drug trafficking but was paroled on June 15, 2020 for turning witness on Panamanian dictator Manuel Antonio Noriega's trial and also for prostate cancer.
Darya Nikolayevna Saltykova	1768	1801	33 years	Russia	Countess convicted of killing 38 female serfs by beating and torturing them to death. Imprisoned at Ivanovsky Convent in Moscow; for the first 11 years, she was chained in a basement dungeon without a window and only given a candle during meals.
Benedetto Santapaola	May 18, 1993	March 2, 2026	32 years, 288 days	Italy	Boss of the Sicilian Mafia at Catania. Santapaola was caught in 1993 after 11 years hiding and received five life sentences for a series of murders and massacres including the Circonvallazione massacre in which the rival boss Alfio Ferlito and four policemen were slaughtered. Santapaola died on March 2, 2026, aged 87.
John Stanfa	March 17, 1994	ongoing	32 years, 250 days	United States	Boss of the Philadelphia crime family between 1987–1994. Stanfa is jailed from 1994 serving five life sentences for multiple murders, multiple murder attempts, gambling, kidnapping and extortion.
Ramzi Yousef	February 7, 1995	ongoing	31 years, 288 days	United States	Pakistani terrorist arrested in 1995 of terrorism conspiracy and other charges in connection with the 1993 World Trade Center bombing, which killed six people and injured more than 1,000. Yousef was also convicted in 1996 of planning Project Bojinka, a foiled plot conceived by his uncle and senior al-Qaeda member Khalid Sheikh Mohammed to assassinate Pope John Paul II and bomb twelve planes in a 48-hour period.
Yolanda Saldívar	March 31, 1995	ongoing	31 years, 236 days	United States	Found guilty of first-degree murder in the death of Tejano singer Selena Quintanilla-Pérez on March 31, 1995. Nine hours after committing the killing, Saldivar was arrested. Placed in solitary confinement after receiving numerous death threats from fellow inmates.
Terry Nichols	April 21, 1995	ongoing	31 years, 215 days	United States	Nichols conspired with Timothy McVeigh to bomb the Alfred P. Murrah Federal Building in Oklahoma City which resulted in the deaths of 168 people and the injury of 684 others. 2 days after bombing, Nichols was arrested and received 162 life sentences plus 93 years without parole for using a weapon of mass destruction, first-degree arson and first-degree murder including a fetus.
Leoluca Bagarella	June 24, 1995	ongoing	31 years, 151 days	Italy	Hitman of the Sicilian Mafia and Corleonesi Mafia boss Salvatore Riina's brother in-law. Bagarella was given 13 life sentences plus 107 years in solitary confinement for executing personally 150 murders in Italy including the Antimafia prosecutor Giovanni Falcone in 1992. Bagarella was arrested in 1995 after four years in hiding.
Frank LoCascio	December 11, 1990	October 1, 2021	30 years, 294 days	United States	Consigliere of the Gambino crime family and John Gotti's friend, with whom he was arrested and life sentenced for the same charges. He died in 2021 at prison medical center in Devens.
Nicodemo Scarfo	January 8, 1987	January 13, 2017	30 years, 5 days	United States	Paranoiac boss of the Philadelphia crime family between 1981–1987. Scarfo was jailed from 1987 and 69-year sentenced in 1989 for racketeering and first-degree murder. He died in 2017 at prison medical center in Butner, North Carolina.

=== 20–29 years ===
Name	Sentence start	Sentence end	Sentence duration	Country	Description
Luis Felipe	1997	ongoing	29 years, 281 days	United States	Leader of the New York chapter of the Latin Kings. Convicted and placed in solitary confinement for ordering several murders when he was already in prison for other offenses.
Man in the Iron Mask	1669?	1675	c. 29 years	France	A mysterious prisoner kept in a solitary cell with double doors (to mute conversations) and forced to wear a black velvet mask at all times, following direct orders of Louis XIV. Much debate exists about the identity of the prisoner (variously called Marchioly or Eustache Dauger) and the reason of his confinement. After his death, myths arose claiming that the prisoner wore a full-headed iron mask, rather than velvet, and that two Musketeers of the Guard were posted with orders to shoot him if he removed it. The solitary spell was interrupted between 1675 and 1680, when the man in the mask served the also imprisoned Nicholas Fouquet, Marquis of Belle-Îlle as his valet.
Man in the Iron Mask	1680	1703	c. 29 years	France	
Robert Hillary King	1972	2001	29 years	United States	Placed in solitary confinement for the same murder as Woodfox and Wallace, until his original conviction was overturned.
Manuel Abimael Guzman	September 12, 1992	September 11, 2021	28 years, 364 days	Peru	Peruvian terrorist leader of the Shining Path between 1969–1992 who was arrested in 1992 and given two life sentences for coordinating the Tarata bombing. In September 2021, he died aged 86 by pneumonia.
Francesco Schiavone	July 11, 1998	ongoing	28 years, 134 days	Italy	Casalesi clan leader who succeeded the organization forerunner Antonio Bardellino. Jailed since 1998 serving 3 life sentences plus 7 years for Bardellino's murder at Spartacus Trial and for other crimes.
Antonio Imerti	March 23, 1993	July 28, 2021	28 years, 127 days	Italy	Boss of the Ndrangheta in Calabrian city of Villa San Giovanni, Imerti is famous for surviving a bombing in 1985. He was 45-year sentenced for murder and mafia association at a maxi-trial named Olimpia. After 6 years hiding, was caught in 1993 and subjected to the harsh 41-bis prison regime but was released by a Constitutional Court pardon, in July 2021.
Anthony Casso	January 19, 1993	December 15, 2020	27 years, 331 days	United States	Former underboss of the Lucchese crime family, arrested in 1993 and sentenced to 455 years without parole in 1998 for 36 murders, extortion, bribery, assault and witness program infractions. Died on December 15, 2020 by complications related to COVID-19.
Baldassare Amato	June 10, 1999	ongoing	27 years, 165 days	United States	Sicilian mobster of the Bonanno crime family, who was sentenced to life for having murdered Robert Perrino, Joseph Platia and Sebastiano DiFalco.
Manuel Antonio Noriega	January 3, 1990	January 23, 2017	27 years, 20 days	United States	Military leader of Panama between 1983–1990, who was arrested in 1990 during the U.S. invasion of Panama, extradited to USA and 60-year sentenced for racketeering, drug trafficking, money laundering and crimes against humanity. Noriega was returned to Panama where he was released in January 2017 and four months later died by intracerebral hemorrhage, aged 83.
Zacarias Moussaoui	August 16, 2001	ongoing	25 years, 98 days	United States	French citizen and Al-Qaeda operative, pleaded guilty to terrorism conspiracy charges in 2005 for playing a key role in planning the September 11 attacks by helping the hijackers obtain flight lessons, money and material used in the attacks. For these charges, Moussaoui received six consecutive life sentences.
Salvatore Riina	January 15, 1993	November 17, 2017	24 years, 306 days	Italy	Reputed "boss of bosses" of the Sicilian mafia between 1974 and 1993, nicknamed "The Beast". Riina was given 26 life sentences to have ordered Second Mafia War that left +5000 killed in Sicily between the 1980s and early 1990s included the Antimafia prosecutors Giovanni Falcone and Paolo Borsellino in 1992. Riina after 23 years hiding, was caught in 1993 and died in prison by cancer, in 2017.
Mehmet Ali Ağca	May 13, 1981	January 12, 2006	24 years, 244 days	Turkey	Turkish hitman famous for wounding Pope John Paul II in 1981, was arrested at the shooting scene. Ali Ağca was life sentenced by Italian authorities but pardoned in 2000 by Italian president Carlo Azeglio Ciampi and extradited to Turkey. Although required to serve a sentence in Turkey for journalist Abdi İpekçi's murder, Ali Ağca was paroled in 2006 for good behavior but rearrested 8 days later. Released on January 18, 2010.
Mary Mallon	March 27, 1915	November 11, 1938	23 years, 229 days	United States	First known case of asymptomatic carrier of typhoid. Quarantined for life in New York City's North Brother Island after refusing to have her gallblader removed or stop working as a cook.
Ian Manuel	1993	2016	23 years	United States	Tried as an adult and sentenced to life for non-fatally shooting a woman during a robbery, when he was 13 years old. His sentence was reduced after it was ruled that imprisoning minors who had not killed anyone for life was unconstitutional. Released.
Eric Rudolph	October 14, 2003	ongoing	23 years, 39 days	United States	Member of the Christian extremist group Army of God; pleaded guilty in 2005 to carrying out four bombings between 1996 and 1998, including the Centennial Olympic Park bombing in Atlanta; he killed three people during the bombing spree.
Donato Bilancia	May 6, 1998	December 17, 2020	22 years, 225 days	Italy	Italian serial killer active in the Italian Riviera known for killing 8 men and 8 women (7 prostitutes and one nurse) between 1997–1998. Bilancia was arrested in 1998 and received 13 life sentences plus 30 years in solitary confinement. Died in 2020, aged 69 by COVID-19 at Padua prison.
Ivan VI of Russia	December 6, 1741	July 16, 1764	22 years, 223 days	Russia	Overthrown when he was one year old and imprisoned in solitary until he was assassinated at the age of 23, in order to prevent his release.
Albert Millet	June 13, 1979	December 20, 2001	22 years, 190 days	France	French serial killer and multirecidivist; in 1979 was arrested 4 hours after stabbing to death against his second girlfiend and 25-year sentenced then, in 2001 was released. But six years later, Millet met a neighbor named Chantal Cardinuto and on 19 November 2007 after jealous scene, Millet re-murdered his 4th girlfriend Chantal and her friend Christian in Cardinuto's apartment. One hour after the double murder, Millet was cornered by police and shot himself aged 78.
Frank De Palma	February 3, 1992	March 11, 2014	22 years, 36 days	United States	Kept in solitary for attacking a guard while serving a 42+ years stay in a Nevada prison for murder and other offenses. Released in 2018.
Leonora Christina Ulfeldt	1663	1685	22 years	Denmark	Daughter of Christian IV of Denmark. Confined to a small cell in the Blue Tower of Copenhagen Castle by her brother, Frederick III, accused of treason. Released after 22 years by Christian V, she joined a convent where she died in 1698, aged 76.
Russell Melvin Shoats	1992	2014	22 years	United States	Member of the Black Unity Council, Black Panther Party and Black Liberation Army, sentenced to life in prison without parole for the murder of a police officer. Shoats spent his time in solitary in a 7-by-12 foot cell, always illuminated by lights, for 23 or 24 hours a day.
Anthony Gay	1994	2016	22 years	United States	Originally imprisoned in Illinois for stealing a dollar bill and a hat, was added time to his sentence for disciplinary reasons until he served 24 years and almost all in solitary.
Jhon Jairo Velásquez	October 9, 1992	August 26, 2014	21 years, 321 days	Colombia	Chief of gunmen on drug kingpin Pablo Escobar. Popeye surrendered to justice in 1992 after 3 months on the run from Los Pepes (criminal network focused on hunting Pablo Escobar) and was 23-year sentenced for having confessed to 3,500 murders including Politician Leader Luis Carlos Galán, Medellin Chief police Waldemar Franklin Quintero, and the Attorney General Carlos Mauro Hoyos. He was paroled in August 2014 after serving 80% of his conviction but rearrested in 2018 on blackmail charges and died by esophageal cancer on February 6, 2020, in Bogotá.
Maurice Boucher	October 10, 2000	July 10, 2022	21 years, 273 days	Canada	Canadian president of the Hells Angels Motorcycle Club, arrested in 2000 and in 2002 received life imprisonment plus 35 years without parole for murdering 2 prison guards and attempted murder. Died by throat cancer in 2022, aged 69.
Clayton Fountain	1983	2004	21 years	United States	Marine sentenced to life in prison for the murder of his staff sergeant in 1974, and placed in solitary after murdering three other prisoners and one corrections officer. Converted to Catholicism and was accepted as a lay brother of the Trappist monks posthumously.
Rudolf Hess	October 1, 1966	August 17, 1987	20 years, 320 days	West Berlin (Allied occupation)	Deputy Führer of Nazi Germany sentenced to life in prison for "crimes against peace". He was the only remaining prisoner of Spandau Prison after the release of all other inmates, until his suicide at the age of 93.
John T. Downey	1952	1973	20 years, 3 months and 14 days	China	CIA agent captured along Richard Fecteau in Manchuria after their plane was shot down by Chinese forces during the Korean War; the mission was part of a failed attempt to establish an anti-Communist guerrilla in mainland China. Released after the thaw of Chinese-American relations. There was a three-week break in their solitary confinement in 1955, when they were allowed to interact with the crew of a downed American B-29.
Gaetano Badalamenti	April 8, 1984	April 29, 2004	20 years, 21 days	United States	Boss of the Sicilian Mafia of the village of the Cinisi, who was involved in the Pizza Connection case. Badalamenti was arrested in 1984 at Spain and extradited to USA on November 15. He was sentenced to life plus 45 years for drug trafficking (USA justice) and journalist Giuseppe Impastato's murder (Italian justice). Died in 2004 at the Devens Federal Medical Center in Ayer, Massachusetts by heart failure.
Giovanni Passannante	1879	1899	20 years	Italy	Attempted assassin of Umberto I of Italy. Locked in a dark, small cell below sea level in Portoferraio, Isle of Elba. His conditions became a scandal after they were revealed and he was moved to an asylum in Montelupo Fiorentino, where he died in 1910.

== Longest spells on death row ==
These prisoners were sentenced to death rather than prison, but their execution was stalled for a prolonged time due to different reasons.

=== 50 years or more ===
Name	Sentence start	Sentence end	Sentence duration	Country	Description
Nobuo Oda	December 14, 1968	ongoing	57 years, 352 days	Japan	One of two perpetrators of the 1966 Maruyo Wireless Incident. Oda, a 20-year-old employee at the Maruyo radio station at the time of the crime, was found guilty and sentenced to death for beating two other employees with a hammer, robbing the place, and setting a fire that killed one of the employees. He is both Japan's and the world's longest-serving death row inmate.
Matsuzo Ohama	October 20, 1975	ongoing	51 years, 33 days	Japan	Murdered a woman and her two daughters in Hiratsuka because of his sensitivity to noise. Withdrew his appeals in 1977, but has never been executed due to concerns about his mental health.
William Lee Thompson	June 25, 1976	ongoing	50 years, 150 days	United States	Sentenced to death in Florida for the torture, sexual assault, and murder of a woman in the motel in Miami-Dade County in March 1976. His co-conspirator Rocco Surace was also initially sentenced to death, but was resentenced to life in 1977 and died in prison in 1993. He is both Florida's and the USA's longest-serving death row inmate.
William Thomas Zeigler Jr.	July 16, 1976	ongoing	50 years, 129 days	United States	Sentenced to death in Florida for the quadruple murder of Eunice Zeigler, Perry and Virginia Edwards, and Charlie Mays.
Virgil Delano Presnell Jr.	August 26, 1976	ongoing	50 years, 88 days	United States	Longest-serving death row inmate in Georgia. Sentenced to death for kidnapping and murdering an 8-year-old girl, as well as raping her 10-year-old friend.
Henry Perry Sireci	November 15, 1976	ongoing	50 years, 7 days	United States	Sentenced to death in Florida for the murder of a used-car dealer in Orlando in 1975 and sentenced to life for the murder of a 7-Eleven Clerk in 1975.

=== 40 to 49 years ===
Name	Sentence start	Sentence end	Sentence duration	Country	Description
Masayasu Fujii	March 31, 1977	ongoing	49 years, 236 days	Japan	Ordered the murders of three people over monetary disputes between 1970 and 1973. His two accomplices were also sentenced to death initially, but they had their sentences commuted to life on appeal.
Harold Gene Lucas	February 9, 1977	September 1, 2026	49 years, 204 days	United States	Sentenced to death in Florida for murdering his former girlfriend in Bonita Springs in 1976. Executed via lethal injection on September 1, 2026. Longest serving death row inmate that was executed in the United States.
James Franklin Rose	May 13, 1977	ongoing	49 years, 193 days	United States	Sentenced to death in Florida for killing the daughter of his ex-girlfriend. In 2018, he was sentenced to life without parole for the rape and murder of a woman in 1975.
Joseph Clarence Smith Jr.	August 31, 1977	ongoing	49 years, 83 days	United States	Smith was found guilty of murdering and raping two teenage hitchhikers, 18-year-old Sandy Spencer and 14-year-old Neva Lee, between 1975 and 1976. Currently the longest-serving death row inmate in Arizona.
James Ernest Hitchcock	February 11, 1977	April 30, 2026	49 years, 78 days	United States	Sentenced to death in Florida for the 1976 rape and murder of his 13-year-old stepniece in Winter Garden. Hitchcock was executed by lethal injection on April 30, 2026.
Harvey Earvin	October 26, 1977	ongoing	49 years, 27 days	United States	Longest held prisoner on death row in Texas. Sentenced to death for shooting and killing a service station attendant in 1976.
Kiyoshi Watanabe	May 30, 1978	ongoing	48 years, 176 days	Japan	Robbed and murdered four sex workers in Osaka and Nagoya between 1967 and 1973. Originally sentenced to life imprisonment in 1975, which was commuted to a death sentence on appeal. Watanabe is Japan's longest-serving juvenile death row inmate.
Richard Gerald Jordan	March 2, 1977	June 25, 2025	48 years, 115 days	United States	Sentenced to death for the abduction and murder of a woman in Mississippi. Jordan was Mississippi's longest-serving death row inmate. He was executed by lethal injection on June 25, 2025.
Earl Lloyd Jackson	March 19, 1979	ongoing	47 years, 248 days	United States	Sentenced to death in California for the robbery and murder of two elderly widows in August and September 1977. He is California's longest serving death row inmate.
Clarence Curtis Jordan	September 12, 1978	April 9, 2026	47 years, 209 days	United States	Sentenced for the 1977 murder of a market clerk in Texas. Jordan's execution was indefinitely stayed after the court found him mental incompetent in 1987. Jordan's death sentence was overturned in April 2026 on account of his intellectual disability and schizophrenic condition, and two months later, he was re-sentenced to life imprisonment.
Arturo Daniel Aranda	May 18, 1979	ongoing	47 years, 188 days	United States	Sentenced to death for the 1976 murder of a police officer in Texas.
Toshiaki Masunaga	November 12, 1979	November 22, 2026	47 years, 10 days	Japan	East Asia Anti-Japan Armed Front terrorist who participated in the bombing of several offices between 1972 and 1975, killing eight people and injuring numerous others. This was the deadliest terrorist attack on Japanese soil until the Tokyo subway sarin attack in 1995. His co-defendant Masashi Daidōji died on May 24, 2017. Masunaga died in prison on November 22, 2026, at the age of 78.
Richard Galvan Montiel	November 27, 1979	ongoing	46 years, 360 days	United States	Sentenced to death in California for the 1979 murder of an elderly man during a burglary while high on PCP.
James Phillip Anderson	December 9, 1979	ongoing	46 years, 348 days	United States	Sentenced to death in California for the 1979 strangling deaths of a woman and her grandmother during a robbery. Suspected of fatally shooting a service station attendant but was not charged with his death.
Paul William Scott	December 14, 1979	ongoing	46 years, 343 days	United States	Sentenced to death in Florida for the 1978 murder of James Alessi in Boca Raton, Florida.
Karu Gene White	March 29, 1980	ongoing	46 years, 238 days	United States	Robbed and murdered three elderly shopkeepers in Breathitt County, Kentucky in 1979. He is Kentucky's longest-serving death row inmate.
David Luther Ghent Jr.	October 30, 1979	c. May 2026	c. 46 years, 213 days	United States	Sentenced to death in California for the February 1978 rape and murder of an acquaintance. Sentenced commuted to life with the possibility of parole in 2026.
Kenneth Darcell Quince	October 21, 1980	ongoing	46 years, 32 days	United States	Sentenced to death in Florida for the December 1979 rape and murder of Frances Bowdoin, 82 at Daytona Beach
Masaru Okunishi	September 10, 1969	October 4, 2015	46 years, 24 days	Japan	Perpetrator of the Nabari Poisoned Wine Incident. In a village in Nara Prefecture, Okunishi mixed pesticides into wine served at a social gathering. 17 women who drank the wine suffered from poisoning symptoms, and 5 died. He was acquitted in his first trial in 1964 due to insufficient evidence, but sentenced to death in his second criminal trial in 1969. His appeals for a retrial were never granted, and he died in Hachioji Medical Prison at the age of 89.
Ian Deco Lightbourne	May 1, 1981	ongoing	45 years, 205 days	United States	Bahamian immigrant sentenced to death in Florida for the December 1979 rape and murder of Nancy O'Farrell in Ocala.
Iwao Hakamata	September 11, 1968	March 27, 2014	45 years, 197 days	Japan	Japanese former professional boxer who was sentenced to death for a 1966 mass murder that became known as the Hakamata Incident. Granted a retrial and found innocent after it was determined that the evidence used to convict him the first time was forged.
Bryan Frederick Jennings	May 7, 1980	November 13, 2025	45 years, 190 days	United States	Jennings was found guilty of kidnapping, raping and murdering a six-year-old girl named Rebecca Kunash in 1979 at Merritt Island, Florida. Jennings was first sentenced to death in 1980, before his appeal led to two separate re-trials that all ended with a death sentence in 1982 and 1986 respectively. Executed by lethal injection on November 13, 2025.
Joe Edward Johnson	June 9, 1981	ongoing	45 years, 166 days	United States	Sentenced to death in Sonoma County, California for bludgeoning a man to death with a barbell during a burglary in 1979.
Jerry Thomas Bunyard	February 2, 1981	July 10, 2026	45 years, 158 days	United States	Sentenced to death in San Joaquin County, California for orchestrating the 1979 murder of his pregnant wife in their home, where she was beaten and fatally shot by Earlin Popham, an acquaintance of Bunyard. Popham received life imprisonment with the possibility of parole. Died in prison on July 10, 2026, at the age of 76.
Jesse Edward Gonzalez	August 5, 1981	ongoing	45 years, 109 days	United States	Sentenced to death in California for fatally shooting a police officer during a narcotics raid at his residence in 1979.
Charles Kenneth Foster	October 4, 1975	December 30, 2020	45 years, 87 days	United States	Sentenced to death in Bay County, Florida for slitting the throat of an elderly man that he met at a bar in 1975. Died in prison on December 30, 2020.
Michael Ray Burgener	September 14, 1981	ongoing	45 years, 69 days	United States	Sentenced to death in California for the 1980 fatal shooting of a 7-Eleven clerk during a robbery in Riverside, California.
John Galen Davenport	November 9, 1981	ongoing	45 years, 13 days	United States	Sentenced to death in California for torturing and murdering a woman in 1980, impaling her on a stake. Resentenced to death in 1988.
Raymond George Riles	April 2, 1976	April 14, 2021	45 years, 12 days	United States	One of the longest held prisoners on death row in Texas. His execution was stayed several times from 1980 onward for different reasons. He was later diagnosed with mental problems and is considered not mentally fit to be executed. He tried to commit suicide in 1985 by setting his jail cell on fire. His death sentence was overturned on April 14, 2021. He was sentenced to life imprisonment on June 9, 2021.
Thomas Eugene Creech	January 25, 1982	ongoing	44 years, 301 days	United States	Sentenced to death for killing a fellow prisoner while incarcerated in Idaho 1981. Creech had been previously on death row for another murder, but his death sentence was overturned by the United States Supreme Court in 1977 after appeal. Creech was scheduled to be executed on February 28, 2024, but the execution was called off after the medical team failed to connect an IV line to him. Creech also survived a second death warrant for November 13, 2024, as it was stayed to allow legal challenges against the drug protocol. He is the longest serving death row inmate in Idaho.
William Bush	January 29, 1982	ongoing	44 years, 297 days	United States	Shooting and murder two convenience store clerk in separate robberies in Montgomery on 1981 He is the Alabama's longest-serving death row inmate.
Phillip Louis Lucero	February 4, 1982	ongoing	44 years, 291 days	United States	Sentenced to death in California for murdering two young Yucaipa girls in his residence in 1980. His death sentence overturned in 1988 due to suspected psychological damage from his military service in the Vietnam war, where he was awarded a Purple Heart, but was later resentenced to death.
Albert Greenwood Brown Jr.	March 2, 1982	ongoing	44 years, 265 days	United States	Pedophile who abducted and murdered a 15-year-old on her way to school while being on parole for molesting another girl in California. Brown was scheduled for execution on September 30, 2010, but it was put on hold due to lethal injection supplies being unavailable at the time.
Fermin Rodriguez Ledesma	March 14, 1980	c. 2024	c.44 years, 236 days	United States	Sentenced to death in California for murdering a gas station attendant in 1978. Ledesma has previously robbed the attendant the month prior, and decided to kill him after the attendant reported him to the police. Sentence reduced to life imprisonment without the possibility of parole in late 2024.
John Charles Lesko	April 24, 1982	ongoing	44 years, 212 days	United States	Sentenced to death for the Western Pennsylvania "Kill for Thrill" murders. His accomplice Michael Travaglia was also sentenced to death but he died in September 2017, after spending 35 years on death row. Lesko is the longest-serving death row inmate in Pennsylvania.
Omar Blanco	May 24, 1982	ongoing	44 years, 182 days	United States	Sentenced to death in Florida for murdering John Ryan at Fort Lauderdale on January 14, 1982.
Hiroshi Sakaguchi	June 18, 1982	ongoing	44 years, 157 days	Japan	Murdered two policemen and another person during a shootout with police in a holiday lodge below Mount Asama. He is a member of the United Red Army and was involved in the murder of 14 other members of the terrorist organization.
Milford Wade Byrd	August 13, 1982	ongoing	44 years, 101 days	United States	Sentence to death in Florida for orchestrating the murder of his wife at his motel in Tampa, Florida in 1981.
David Eugene Matthews	November 11, 1982	ongoing	44 years, 11 days	United States	Sentenced to death in Kentucky 1981 for murdering his estranged wife and his mother-in-law in Louisville.
Ricardo Rene Sanders	December 3, 1982	ongoing	43 years, 354 days	United States	Sentenced to death for murdering four people at a Bob's Big Boy restaurant in Los Angeles during a robbery.
Larry McKay	February 7, 1983	ongoing	43 years, 288 days	United States	Sentenced to death in Tennessee for murdering two clerks during a robbery in 1981. His co-defendant Michael Eugene Sample also convicted and sentenced to death, but was resentenced to life imprisonment in May 2023. Currently the longest-serving death row inmate in Tennessee.
Hajime Kanekawa	March 17, 1983	ongoing	43 years, 250 days	Japan	Stabbed to death a 21-year-old housewife in Kumamoto during an attempted rape. The crime was committed shortly after he was released from prison for a 1969 murder conviction. Kanekawa was originally sentenced to life imprisonment, but this was changed to a death sentence on appeal.
Ronald Allen Smith	March 22, 1983	ongoing	43 years, 245 days	United States	Only Canadian on death row in the United States and one of two death row inmates in Montana. Smith, along with another man, murdered two Native American men who offered them a ride while the former were under the influence of LSD. His accomplice accepted a plea deal to avoid the death penalty, while Smith refused and requested capital punishment for himself.
Katsuhisa Omori	March 29, 1983	ongoing	43 years, 238 days	Japan	East Asia Anti-Japan Armed Front terrorist who bombed a government building in Hokkaido, killing two people and injuring at least 80 others. Amnesty International alleges that Omori was convicted on flimsy testimony and is actually innocent.
Eric Dwayne Kimble (Note: Also known as Eric B. Kimble)	April 6, 1981	c. 2024	c.43 years, 158 days	United States	Sentenced to death in California for murdering couple Harry and Avone Marguiles and ransacking their stereo equimpent store. He additionally raped Avone Marguiles in the course of the murder. Sentence reduced to life with the possibility of parole in 2024.
Michael Angelo Morales	June 30, 1983	ongoing	43 years, 145 days	United States	Raped and murdered a 17-year-old girl who was in a love triangle with Morales's cousin and another man in California; his cousin was sentenced to life in prison as inductor. Though Morales did not deny his guilt, doubts about the evidence presented in his trial mounted as his scheduled execution for February 21, 2006, came near. The execution was postponed indefinitely due to medical professionals refusing to participate in executions, as their presence is obligatory under California law.
Oscar Gates	August 11, 1981	c. 2024	c.43 years, 114 days	United States	Sentenced to death in California for the 1979 robbery and murder of Lonnie Stevenson. Gates was part of a forgery ring operated by the Stevenson family and attacked members Lonnie and Maurice Stevenson following a financial dispute; Maurice survived the attack. Sentence reduced to life with the possibility of parole in 2024.
Keith Edward Adcox	July 13, 1983	October 30, 2026	43 years, 109 days	United States	Sentenced to death in California for fatally shooting a fisherman during a camping trip in Tuolumne County, stealing his car and money. His co-defendant Howard Love was sentenced to life imprisonment with the possibility of parole but died in 2019. Adcox was resentenced to life imprisonment with the possibility of parole on October 30, 2026.
Mitchell Willoughby	September 15, 1983	ongoing	43 years, 68 days	United States	Willoughby and co-defendant Leif Halvorsen were convicted of shooting and murdering Jacqueline Greene, Joe Norman, and Joey Durham in Lexington, Kentucky on January 13, 1983. Both were sentenced to death in 1983. In 2019, before Kentucky Governor Matt Bevin left office, he commuted Halvorsen's sentence to life imprisonment with the possibility of parole.
Marvin Pete Walker Jr.	September 8, 1980	c. 2023	c.42 years, 330 days	United States	Sentenced to death in California for the 1979 fatal shooting a 15-year-old boy during a robbery in San Jose, California. Sentence reduced to life with the possibility of parole in 2023.
Harry Franklin Phillips	February 1, 1984	ongoing	42 years, 294 days	United States	Sentenced to death in Florida for the shooting death of his probation supervisor in Miami, Florida.
Gerald Frank Stanley	February 8, 1984	ongoing	42 years, 287 days	United States	Sentenced to death in California for the shooting death of his wife in 1980 while paroled for killing his ex-wife.
Jason Dirk Walton	March 14, 1984	ongoing	42 years, 253 days	United States	Sentenced to death in Florida for murdering three men in Largo in 1982.
Tetsuya Sasaki	March 15, 1984	ongoing	42 years, 252 days	Japan	Murdered his parents at their home in Ichihara in 1974 because they disapproved of his relationship with a woman working at a brothel. The bodies of his parents were discovered in Tokyo Bay, and at the same time their identities were confirmed, the son was arrested on suspicion of murder and abandonment of corpses.
Ronald Turney Williams	April 23, 1984	ongoing	42 years, 213 days	United States	Sentenced to death in Arizona for the murder of a passerby during a burglary in 1981. He was previously serving a life sentence for mudering a police officer in West Virginia but escaped, killing a second police officer in the progress.
Carl Puiatti	May 5, 1984	ongoing	42 years, 201 days	United States	Sentenced to death in Florida for the 1983 kidnapping and murder of a Bradenton school teacher. Robert Dewey Glock, his accomplice, was also sentenced to death and executed by lethal injection on January 11, 2001.
Scott Lynn Pinholster	June 4, 1984	ongoing	42 years, 171 days	United States	Sentenced to death for the 1982 fatal stabbing of two men in Los Angeles, California.
Kayle Barrington Bates	March 11, 1983	August 19, 2025	42 years, 161 days	United States	Sentenced to death for abducting and murdering a woman from an insurance office where she worked. Executed by lethal injection on August 19, 2025.
Von Clark Davis	June 19, 1984	ongoing	42 years, 156 days	United States	Sentenced to death for the fatal shooting of his ex-girlfriend Suzette Butler in 1983. Scheduled to be executed on January 9, 2029.
George Emil Banks	June 22, 1983	November 2, 2025	42 years, 133 days	United States	Spree killer sentenced to death for the murders of twelve people in the 1982 Wilkes-Barre Shootings, including his five children. Although his insanity defence was rejected at the trial, he was later ruled incompetent to be executed in 2004 and 2010. Died in prison at the age of 83 of natural causes.
John David Stumpf	September 28, 1984	ongoing	42 years, 55 days	United States	Sentenced to death for shooting Mary Jane Stout to death in 1984 during a robbery. Scheduled to be executed on August 18, 2027.
Paul Beasley Johnson	September 22, 1981	September 30, 2023	42 years, 8 days	United States	Sentenced to death for a 1981 triple murder, including the shooting of a police officer. Died in prison on September 30, 2023.
Michael Anthony Jackson	May 30, 1984	June 6, 2026	42 years, 7 days	United States	Sentenced to death for murdering a West Covina Police Officer in 1983. Died in prison at the age of 72.
David Joseph Carpenter	November 26, 1984	ongoing	41 years, 361 days	United States	Oldest death row inmate in California history. Sentenced to death for the murder of 2 women in Henry Cowell Redwoods State Park. Later convicted and sentenced to death for the murder of 5 others in Marion county.
Brian Keith Moore	November 29, 1984	ongoing	41 years, 358 days	United States	Sentenced to death in Kentucky for kidnapping, robbing and murdering an elderly man in Jefferson County, Kentucky in 1979. He has maintained his innocence.
Richard Delmer Boyer	December 14, 1984	ongoing	41 years, 343 days	United States	Sentenced to death in California for fatally stabbing an elderly couple.
Terry Lynn King	February 6, 1985	ongoing	41 years, 289 days	United States	Sentenced to death for the 1983 rape and murder of Diana Smith in Tennessee.
William Theodore Boliek Jr.	December 11, 1984	July 28, 2026	41 years, 229 days	United States	Sentenced to death for the murder of an 18-year-old girl in Kansas City in 1983. In 1997, Boliek was granted a stay of execution by Governor Mel Carnahan. Carnahan died in a plane crash in 2000 and Boliek's case was not resolved. A court determined only Carnahan could overturn the stay, effectively leaving Boliek's case in permanent limbo. Governor Jay Nixon's office determined Boliek would not be executed and he would spend the remainder of his life in prison. Up until his death, Boliek was Missouri's longest-serving death row inmate. Boliek died of natural causes on July 28, 2026.
Thomas Dewey Pope	April 7, 1982	October 31, 2023	41 years, 207 days	United States	Sentenced to death for the murder of Kristine Walters in 1981. Also shot and killed two more men in the same day, but was sentenced to life for those murders. Died in prison on October 31, 2023.
Kevin Cooper	May 21, 1985	ongoing	41 years, 185 days	United States	Career burglar sentenced to death for the murders of four members of the same family and attempted murder of two others during a home invasion in Chino Hills, California in 1983, shortly after he escaped from prison. Cooper was scheduled for execution on February 10, 2004, but it was postponed to allow DNA testing of the crime scene and getaway vehicle that did not exist at the time of his conviction. The results of both tests supported the case against Cooper.
Hideaki Ogoshi	May 31, 1985	ongoing	41 years, 175 days	Japan	Murdered his common-law wife's four family members because they convinced her to break up with him over his gambling debts. Ogoshi claims that his ex-wife was the true killer, and that he was framed for the murders.
Robert Ira Peede	March 5, 1984	July 21, 2025	41 years, 138 days	United States	Sentenced to death for the 1983 stabbing murder of his wife in a ploy to kill his ex-wife and her boyfriend. Died in prison on July 21, 2025.
Joe Elton Nixon	July 30, 1985	ongoing	41 years, 115 days	United States	Sentenced to death in Florida for the 1984 Kidnapping and burning alive a 38-year-old woman in Leon County.
Jerome Henderson	August 12, 1985	ongoing	41 years, 102 days	United States	Sentenced to death for murdering his neighbour Mary Acoff during an attempted rape in 1985. Scheduled to be executed on September 18, 2029.
Seiichiro Muramatsu	September 26, 1985	ongoing	41 years, 57 days	Japan	Strangled a mother and her adult son during a failed robbery in Miyashiro, then set their house ablaze. His younger brother was sentenced to life imprisonment.
Raynard Paul Cummings	October 3, 1985	ongoing	41 years, 50 days	United States	Sentenced to death in California for fatally shooting police officer Paul Verna during a traffic stop in 1983. He, along with co-conspirator Kenneth Gay, had committed a string of robberies beforehand. Gay's convictions were overturned in 2020 and he was resentenced to life without the possibility of parole on November 27, 2023.
Arthur Lee Giles	August 18, 1979	September 30, 2020	41 years, 43 days	United States	Was the longest-serving inmate on Alabama's death row, having been convicted of the 1978 murders of a couple in Blount County, Alabama. Giles died of pneumonia while on death row.
Patrick Charles McKenna	March 1980	April 19, 2021	41 years, 1 month	United States	Spent most of his adult life in prison for various violent crimes, and was sentenced to death for the murder of his cell mate. He died on death row in Nevada.
Michael Anthony Cox	December 5, 1985	ongoing	40 years, 352 days	United States	Serial killer who murdered three girls in Placerville, California in 1984. He has maintained his innocence.
Michael Owen Perry	January 8, 1986	ongoing	40 years, 318 days	United States	Murdered his parents, two of his cousins, and his 2-year-old nephew in Lake Arthur, Louisiana. Perry is Louisiana's longest-serving death row inmate.
Danny Lee Hill	March 5, 1986	ongoing	40 years, 262 days	United States	Hill was one of the two people convicted of the 1985 rape and murder of 12-year-old Raymond Fife in Warren, Ohio. Only Hill, who was 18 at the time of the crime, was sentenced to death, and currently scheduled for execution on July 18, 2029. His accomplice Timothy Combs, who was 17 when the crime happened, was spared the death sentence and instead sentenced to life imprisonment; Combs died in prison in 2018.
Seijiro Yamano	July 22, 1985	March 3, 2026	40 years, 254 days	Japan	Murdered two people as part of a real estate scam, Yamano contended that both murders were made in self-defense. He wrote multiple books while on death row. Died from organ failure at 86 years old.
William Harold Kelley	April 2, 1984	December 3, 2024	40 years, 245 days	United States	Sentenced to death in Florida for the 1966 murder of Charles Von Maxcy at his Highlands County residence, which was ordered by his wife Irene; he had evaded arrest for nearly 17 years. Died in prison on December 3, 2024, at the age of 81.
Alphonso Cave	December 10, 1982	August 3, 2023	40 years, 236 days	United States	Parker and Cave were among the four men charged with the kidnapping and murder of Frances Slater in Florida on April 27, 1982. Parker, Cave and a third man named John Earl Bush were sentenced to death for first-degree murder, while the fourth person, Terry Wayne Johnson, was sentenced to life in prison. Bush was executed by the electric chair on October 21, 1996, after spending 14 years on death row. After several appeals and re-sentencing hearings, Parker's sentence was commuted to life imprisonment during his third re-sentencing trial on March 31, 2023. Cave died of unknown causes on August 3, 2023, while still on death row awaiting his execution.
Lawrence Alfred Landrum	April 3, 1986	ongoing	40 years, 233 days	United States	Slit the throat of an 84-year-old man during a burglary in Ohio in 1985. Scheduled to be executed on October 13, 2027.
Jerry Leon Haliburton	October 7, 1983	May 13, 2024	40 years, 219 days	United States	Sentenced to death in Florida for the murder of Donald Bohannon during a burglary in 1981. Died in prison on May 13, 2024.
Anthony Darrell Dugard Hines	January 10, 1986	August 13, 2026	40 years, 215 days	United States	Sentenced to death in Tennessee for the rape and murder of hotel maid Catherine Jean Jenkins in 1985. Executed by lethal injection on August 13, 2026.
Douglas Ray Stankewitz	October 12, 1978	May 3, 2019	40 years, 203 days	United States	Formely the longest-serving death row inmate at California's San Quentin State Prison and a member of the Mono nation sentenced to death for the abduction and murder of a 22-year-old woman. Retried twice and sentenced to death on both occasions. Retried a third time and sentenced to life in prison without parole in 2019.
Douglas Daniel Clark	March 24, 1983	October 11, 2023	40 years, 201 days	United States	One of the couple known as the "Sunset Strip Killers", who raped and murdered six women in Los Angeles during the summer of 1980. His partner, Carol Bundy, died in prison in 2003. Clark died of natural causes at a medical facility in 2023.
Tiequon Aundray Cox	May 7, 1986	ongoing	40 years, 199 days	United States	Member of the Crips sentenced to death for the hired mass murder of five relatives of former NFL player Kermit Alexander in their home. Cox was 18 at the time of the crimes.
Gerald Ross Pizzuto Jr.	May 23, 1986	ongoing	40 years, 183 days	United States	Beat a Marsing, Idaho woman and her nephew to death in July 1985. He was scheduled for execution on June 2, 2021. He was granted a stay of execution on May 18, 2021, until a commutation hearing in November 2021.
Victor Dewayne Taylor	May 23, 1986	ongoing	40 years, 183 days	United States	Sentenced to death in Kentucky for 1984 Kidnapping and murdering two Trinity High School students in Louisville.
Mauricio Rodriguez Silva	August 20, 1986	ongoing	40 years, 94 days	United States	Serial killer who killed three teenagers and his half sister in California.
Michael Eugene Sample	February 7, 1983	c. May 2023	c. 40 years, 86 days	United States	Sentenced to death in Tennessee for murdering two clerks during a robbery in 1981. His co-defendant Larry McKay was also sentenced to death and is currently incarcerated on death row. In May 2023, Sample was resentenced to life imprisonment on the grounds of intellectual disability.
J.B. Parker	January 12, 1983	March 31, 2023	40 years, 78 days	United States	Parker and Cave were among the four men charged with the kidnapping and murder of Frances Slater on April 27, 1982. Parker, Cave and a third man named John Earl Bush were sentenced to death for first-degree murder, while the fourth person, Terry Wayne Johnson, was sentenced to life in prison. Bush was executed by the electric chair on October 21, 1996, after spending 14 years on death row. After several appeals and re-sentencing hearings, Parker's sentence was commuted to life imprisonment during his third re-sentencing trial on March 31, 2023. Cave died of unknown causes on August 3, 2023, while still on death row awaiting his execution.

=== 30 to 39 years ===
Name	Sentence start	Sentence end	Sentence duration	Country	Description
Cesar Roberto Fierro	February 14, 1980	December 19, 2019	39 years, 307 days	United States	Mexican national arrested in Ciudad Juarez for the murder of a cab driver in El Paso and convicted in spite of no existing physical evidence linking him to the case. Formerly held on death row in Huntsville, Texas. His sentence was commuted to life in prison on December 19, 2019.
Richard Louis Arnold Phillips	February 20, 1980	c. 2019	c. 39 years, 299 days	United States	Sentenced to death in California for fatally shooting a man during a robbery. Sentence commuted to life imprisonment without the possibility of parole in late 2019.
Samuel Moreland	May 6, 1986	February 27, 2026	39 years, 297 days	United States	Murdered five family members on November 1, 1985 in Ohio. Scheduled to be executed on July 19, 2028, but died in prison on February 27, 2026.
Murray Hooper	February 11, 1983	November 16, 2022	39 years, 278 days	United States	Convicted of participating in the December 31, 1980, robbery and murders of William Patrick Redmond and his mother-in-law Helen Phelps and the attempted murder of Redmond's wife Marilyn. He was executed by lethal injection on November 16, 2022.
Malcolm Joseph Robbins Jr.	May 12, 1983	January 27, 2023	39 years, 260 days	United States	Serial killer who murdered four boys across the United States, raping three of them. Sentenced to death in Santa Barbara County, California and died in prison on January 27, 2023.
Percy Hutton	March 16, 1987	ongoing	39 years, 251 days	United States	Sentenced to death for murdering his friend for allegedly stealing a sewing machine Hutton had hid $750 in. Scheduled to be executed on June 21, 2028.
Michael Thomas Rivera	May 1, 1987	ongoing	39 years, 205 days	United States	Sentenced to death for strangling 11-year-old Staci Jazvac in Florida. He had been convicted of kidnapping and attempting to strangle another 11-year-old previously.
Douglas Stewart Carter	December 27, 1985	May 15, 2025	39 years, 139 days	United States	Sentenced to death for the murder of an elderly woman during a burglary in Provo, Utah. Conviction overturned on May 15, 2025 awaiting retrial. He was eventually freed on bail on September 28, 2026 after DNA evidence excluded him from the murder weapon. Carter was also the longest serving death row inmate in Utah.
William Reaves	September 2, 1987	October 20, 2026	39 years, 48 days	United States	Sentenced to death in Florida for murdering Indian River County Sheriff's Deputy Richard Raczkoski in 1987. Retried in 1992 and again was sentenced to death. Executed by lehtal injection on October 20, 2026.
Gary Eldon Alvord	April 9, 1974	May 19, 2013	39 years, 40 days	United States	Schizophrenic sentenced to death in Florida for the 1973 murder of three women over the price of one game of pool in Tampa after escaping from a mental hospital. One of the women, 18-year-old Lynn Herman, was also raped in the course of the murder. He has previously raped a 10-year-old girl in 1967 but was not found guilty by reason of insanity. Died of a brain tumor on May 19, 2013 after several delays. Up until his death, he was the longest serving death row inmate in the United States.
Takeo Inokuma	October 30, 1987	ongoing	39 years, 23 days	Japan	Former police officer who murdered five people in the vicinity of Lake Yamanaka in October 1984. Inokuma asserts that he was forced to commit the killings on behalf of a loan shark. His accomplice Kazuo Sawachi, was senteced to death also, but died in 2008.
Richard Norman Rojem Jr.	July 15, 1985	June 27, 2024	38 years, 348 days	United States	Sentenced to death in Oklahoma for the 1984 kidnapping, sexual assault and murder of his former stepdaughter, 7-year-old Layla Cummings. Executed by lethal injection on June 27, 2024. According to the Oklahoma Department of Corrections, Rojem was the state's longest-serving death row prisoner at the time of his execution.
Dominick Anthony Occhicone Jr.	September 11, 1987	July 28, 2026	38 years, 320 days	United States	Sentenced to death in Pasco County, Florida for the 1986 murder of his former girlfriend's parents in Holiday, Florida. Executed by lethal injection on July 28, 2026.
Tomoko Fujinami	February 9, 1988	ongoing	38 years, 286 days	Japan	Kidnapped and killed a high school girl and a female office worker in February and March 1980, then made phone calls to demand ransom. A man named Hiroshi Kitano was arrested as her alleged accomplice, but was later found not guilty and exonerated. Fujinami is currently Japan's longest-serving female death row inmate.
Melvin Lee Trotter	May 18, 1987	February 24, 2026	38 years, 282 days	United States	Sentenced to death in Manatee County, Florida for the 1986 murder of Virgie Langford during a robbery. Executed by lethal injection on February 24, 2026.
Gregory Lott	September 1, 1987	May 27, 2026	38 years, 268 days	United States	Sentenced to death for the murder of elderly Ohio man John McGrath in 1986; McGrath was set on fire during a robbery and died a week later. Scheduled to be executed on April 14, 2027, but his sentence was commuted to life in prison on May 27, 2026 on the grounds of intellectual disability.
Lawrence Sigmund Bittaker	March 24, 1981	December 13, 2019	38 years, 264 days	United States	One of the two "Toolbox Killers" who kidnapped, raped, tortured and murdered five teenage girls in southern California during a period of five months in 1979. Died of natural causes in 2019. His partner in crime, Roy Norris, was sentenced to life in prison with possibility of parole after 30 years in exchange for testifying against Bittaker. Norris died in prison on February 24, 2020.
Thomas Otis Knight	April 21, 1975	January 7, 2014	38 years, 261 days	United States	Sentenced to death for the murders of three people in Florida. Knight murdered a couple in Miami in 1974 and later murdered a corrections officer while on death row in 1980. He was executed by lethal injection on January 7, 2014.
Tracy Petrocelli	September 8, 1982	May 27, 2021	38 years, 261 days	United States	Serial killer sentenced to death in Nevada for the March 1982 murder of a used car dealer, and additionally sentenced to life imprisonment in Washington and California for two 1981 murder cases. Petrocelli's death sentence was first overturned in 2017, before it was reinstated in 2019. The death sentence was overturned a second time in 2021 and Petrocelli is currently awaiting another re-sentencing trial as of 2026.
Dennis Michael Sochor	November 2, 1987	July 14, 2026	38 years, 254 days	United States	Sentenced to death for the rape and murder of Patricia Gifford in 1982. Executed by lethal injection on July 14, 2026.
Gregory Esparza	May 23, 1984	January 20, 2023	38 years, 242 days	United States	Sentenced to death in Ohio for murdering a woman during a robbery in 1983. Sentence reduced to life with the possibility of parole on January 20, 2023.
Daniel Burns Jr.	June 2, 1988	ongoing	38 years, 173 days	United States	Burns was convicted of shooting and murdering Florida Highway Patrol Trooper Jeffrey Young during a traffic stop on August 18, 1987. Burns, who was born on January 29, 1945, is the oldest inmate on Florida's death row.
Carlos Jaime Avena	February 22, 1982	c. 2020	c. 38 years, 164 days	United States	Sentenced to death in Los Angeles County, California for fatally shooting two men during a carjacking and robbery in 1980. Avena, along with Jesus Gonzalez, also stabbed an inmate to death in 1981. His death sentence was overturned on August 8, 2019 and his sentence was commuted to life imprisonment without the possibility of parole in 2020.
Melvin D. Bonnell Jr.	June 29, 1988	ongoing	38 years, 146 days	United States	Sentenced to death for fatally shooting Robert Bunner during a burglary in 1987. Scheduled to be executed on October 18, 2029.
Ronald Adrin Gray	July 29, 1988	ongoing	38 years, 116 days	United States	Convict held for the longest time ever on the US Military death row, a serial rapist and murderer who committed his crimes while stationed in Fort Bragg as a member of the 82nd Airborne Division.
Carey Dean Moore	June 20, 1980	August 14, 2018	38 years, 55 days	United States	Sentenced to death for the murders of two taxicab drivers in Nebraska. He was executed by lethal injection on August 14, 2018. He was Nebraska's longest-serving death row inmate.
Kenneth Earl Gay	October 3, 1985	November 27, 2023	38 years, 55 days	United States	Sentenced to death in California for fatally shooting police officer Paul Verna during a traffic stop in 1983. He, along with co-conspirator Raynard Cummings, had committed a string of robberies beforehand. His convictions were overturned in 2020 and was resentenced to life without the possibility of parole on November 27, 2023. As of 2026, Cummings is still on death row.
Kevin Bernard Haley	October 3, 1988	ongoing	38 years, 50 days	United States	Suspected serial killer who murdered up to eight people in 1984; several involved rapes. Sentenced to death twice in California.
Masaharu Kamimiya	October 25, 1988	ongoing	38 years, 28 days	Japan	Stabbed a police officer to death during a robbery, stole his gun, and then killed a store clerk in another robbery. Neither of the murder weapons were recovered, and Kamimiya continues to insist that he is innocent.
James Aren Duckett	June 30, 1988	July 28, 2026	38 years, 28 days	United States	Former police officer convicted and sentenced to death for the 1987 rape and murder of 11-year-old Teresa McAbee in Florida. Additionally a suspect in another two murder cases from Florida. Executed by lethal injection on July 28, 2026.
Herbert James Coddington	January 21, 1989	ongoing	37 years, 305 days	United States	Stranged two women after kidnapping two teenage models to sexually assault them in South Lake Tahoe, California. Prime suspect of a third murder of a teenage girl in Las Vegas.
Ronaldo Medrano Ayala	February 9, 1989	ongoing	37 years, 286 days	United States	In 1995, Ronaldo, along with his brother Hector, and another accomplice shot and killed three men in an Auto Repair shop during an attempted robbery in San Diego, California.
Ralph Leroy Menzies	March 23, 1988	November 26, 2025	37 years, 248 days	United States	Abducted and strangled a female gas station attendant in Kearns, Utah. Requested death by firing squad. Died in prison.
James William Wilson Jr.	May 9, 1989	ongoing	37 years, 197 days	United States	Perpetrator of the 1988 Oakland Elementary School shooting; sentenced to death on May 9, 1989.
Masashi Daidōji	November 12, 1979	May 24, 2017	37 years, 193 days	Japan	A Japanese far-left militant who founded the East Asia Anti-Japan Armed Front. After participing in the bombing of several offices between 1972 and 1975, Daidōji was sentenced to death for his role. He remained on death row until he died of natural causes in 2017.
Duane Eugene Owen	March 14, 1986	June 15, 2023	37 years, 93 days	United States	Sentenced to death for the rapes and murders of 14-year-old Karen Slattery and 38-year-old Georgianna Worden. Executed by lethal injection on June 15, 2023.
Heck Van Tran	August 28, 1989	ongoing	37 years, 86 days	United States	Sentenced to death in Tennessee for fatally shooting three people in a restaurant during a robbery.
Cynthia Lynn Coffman	August 31, 1989	ongoing	37 years, 83 days	United States	Convicted for the murders of four women from October to November 1986. Coffman admits to committing the murders, but claims she suffered from battered-woman syndrome.
James Gregory Marlow	August 31, 1989	ongoing	37 years, 83 days	United States	Convicted for the murders of four women from October to November 1986. Coffman admits to committing the murders, but claims she suffered from battered-woman syndrome.
Davel Von Tress Chinn	September 14, 1989	ongoing	37 years, 69 days	United States	Sentenced to death for fatally shooting Brian Jones during a robbery in 1989. Scheduled to be executed on March 13, 2030.
David Allen Lucas	September 19, 1989	ongoing	37 years, 64 days	United States	Sentenced to death in California for the murders of a mother-son pair and another woman in 1979 and 1984. Suspected to have killed three more women but was not convicted of the murders.
David Allen Rundle	September 21, 1989	ongoing	37 years, 62 days	United States	Sentenced to death in California for the rape-murders of two girls in 1986.
Donald Ray Middlebrooks	September 22, 1989	ongoing	37 years, 61 days	United States	Found guilty and sentenced to death for the 1987 racially motivated murder of a 14-year-old African-American boy named Kerrick Majors.
Robert Edward Maury	November 9, 1989	ongoing	37 years, 13 days	United States	Dubbed the ″Tipster Killer″, Maury was sentenced to death in California for strangling three women. Suspected of the murders of two more women. After each murder, he would call detectives anonymously to confuse them or gain reward money. He has maintained his innocence.
Randy Steven Kraft	November 29, 1989	ongoing	36 years, 358 days	United States	Sentenced to death in California for the rapes and torture murders of 16 men committed between 1972–1983. Suspected of committing up to 67 murders.
Hector Juan Ayala	November 30, 1989	ongoing	36 years, 357 days	United States	In 1995, Hector, along with his brother Ronaldo, and another accomplice, shot and killed three men in an Auto Repair shop during an attempted robbery in San Diego, California.
Sadamichi Hirasawa	July 24, 1950	May 10, 1987	36 years, 290 days	Japan	Confessed under torture to have committed the Teikoku Bank Incident of 1948, a mass poisoning of Imperial Bank employees that killed ten people. Hirasawa was never executed because no Justice Minister wanted to sign his death warrant, as all believed that he had been falsely charged. However, he was not granted a retrial either, and he was still in death row when he died from pneumonia in 1987.
Dean Phillip Carter	February 7, 1990	ongoing	36 years, 288 days	United States	Strangled four women to death in California; all were robbed and two were sexually assaulted. Carter is suspected of a fifth murder of another woman.
David Earl Miller	March 17, 1982	December 6, 2018	36 years, 264 days	United States	Sentenced to death for the 1981 murder of 23-year-old intellectually disabled woman, Lee Standifer. Executed by electric chair on December 6, 2018. He was Tennessee's longest-serving death row inmate.
Tomiyama Tsuneyoshi	December 24, 1966	September 3, 2003	36 years, 253 days	Japan	Poisoned his wife's cousin in Hasaki to steal his life insurance. He was arrested on suspicion of forgery and using private documents. He was later sentenced to death without physical evidence or a confession, leading to accusations of a wrongful conviction. Died of kidney failure in prison, at the age of 86.
Norberto Pietri	March 15, 1990	ongoing	36 years, 252 days	United States	Sentenced to death in Florida for shooting and murdering West Palm Beach police officer Brian Chappell in August 1988.
Richard Barry Randolph	April 5, 1989	November 20, 2025	36 years, 229 days	United States	Sentenced to death for the 1988 rape and murder of Minnie McCollum during a robbery. Executed by lethal injection on November 20, 2025.
David Allen Raley	May 24, 1988	c. 2024	c. 36 years, 165 days	United States	Security guard who abducted, raped, beat, and stabbed two teenage girls in the abandoned Carolands mansion where he worked, before throwing them in a landfill. One of his victims died and the other survived. Resentenced to life in prison sometime in 2024.
Byron Lewis Black	March 10, 1989	August 5, 2025	36 years, 148 days	United States	Found guilty of the 1988 murders of his girlfriend and her two daughters in Nashville, Tennessee, and sentenced to death on March 10, 1989. Executed on August 5, 2025 at the Riverbend Maximum Security Institution.
Bigler Jobe Stouffer II	July 22, 1985	December 9, 2021	36 years, 140 days	United States	Sentenced to death for the murder of Linda Reaves in 1985. Stouffer intended to murder another man named Douglas Ivens, the boyfriend of his wife, for Ivens's life insurance, but Ivens survived the shooting incident that killed Reaves, Ivens's other girlfriend. Stouffer, whose death sentence was reversed at one point before the courts reinstated the death sentence, was executed by lethal injection on December 9, 2021.
Steven David Catlin	July 10, 1990	ongoing	36 years, 135 days	United States	Sentenced to death in California for the poisoning of two of his wives and his mother with paraquat.
Jarvis Jay Masters	July 30, 1990	ongoing	36 years, 115 days	United States	Sentenced to death for his role in the 1985 murder of a prison guard in San Quentin Prison, California, in which he was convicted of fashioning the murder weapon. He has maintained his innocence.
Brandon Astor Jones	October 17, 1979	February 3, 2016	36 years, 109 days	United States	Sentenced to death for his involvement in the felony murder of a convenience store manager in Georgia. Was retried and sentenced to death again in 1997 because the jurors at the first trial had brought a Bible into the deliberation room. Oldest prisoner in Georgia at the time of his execution, aged 72.
Darryl Brian Barwick	January 30, 1987	May 3, 2023	36 years, 93 days	United States	Sentenced to death in Florida for the stabbing murder of Rebecca Wendt in 1986. Executed by lethal injection on May 3, 2023.
Leif Christian Halvorsen	September 15, 1983	December 9, 2019	36 years, 85 days	United States	Halvorsen and co-defendant Mitchell Willoughby were convicted of shooting and murdering Jacqueline Greene, Joe Norman, and Joey Durham in Lexington, Kentucky on January 13, 1983. Both were sentenced to death in 1983. In 2019, before Kentucky Governor Matt Bevin left office, he commuted Halvorsen's sentence to life imprisonment with the possibility of parole. Willoughby is currently on death row as of 2026.
Robert Simon Jr.	October 13, 1990	ongoing	36 years, 40 days	United States	Sentenced to death in Mississippi for the torture and murder of the Parker family in 1990, including raping 9-year-old Charlotte Jo Parker. Simon avoided execution in 2011 on the grounds of intellectual disability but was found to be faking a brain injury.
Konstantinos X. Fotopoulos	November 1, 1990	ongoing	36 years, 21 days	United States	Sentenced to death in Florida for fatally shooting two men. One of his victims, Bryan Chase, was hired by Fotopoulos to murder the latter's wife, but failed to kill her after breaking into the couple's house, prompting Fotopoulos to shoot him in order to disguise it as a self-defense killing.
James Lynn Styers	December 14, 1990	ongoing	35 years, 343 days	United States	Styers and Scott were sentenced to death for the shooting death of 4-year-old Christopher Milke in 1989. Debra Milke, Christopher's mother, was accused as the mastermind of his son's death, though her conviction was overturned in 2015.
Ramon Bojorquez Salcido	December 17, 1990	ongoing	35 years, 340 days	United States	Sentenced to death in California for killing six members of his family; all were female. He then shot and killed his co-worker.
Blanche Taylor Moore	January 18, 1991	ongoing	35 years, 308 days	United States	Convicted of poisoning her boyfriend, Raymond Reid, with arsenic. She is also suspected of killing three other members of her family.
Nathaniel Robert Code Jr.	January 25, 1991	ongoing	35 years, 301 days	United States	Serial killer sentenced to death for murdering eight people in Shreveport, Louisiana. Suspected of four more murders.
George James Trepal	March 6, 1991	November 19, 2026	35 years, 258 days	United States	Poisoned a neighboring family in Alturas, Florida, resulting in the death of 41-year-old Peggy Carr. Trepal was later convicted of first degree murder and sentenced to death. Trepal died on death row on November 19, 2026.
Roger Mark Scott	April 22, 1991	ongoing	35 years, 214 days	United States	Scott and Styers were sentenced to death for the shooting death of 4-year-old Christopher Milke in 1989. Debra Milke, Christopher's mother, was accused as the mastermind of his son's death, though her conviction was overturned in 2015. Scott had implicated Styers and Milke for the murder, unlike Styers.
Harold Wayne Nichols	May 12, 1990	December 11, 2025	35 years, 213 days	United States	Sentenced to death for the 1988 rape and murder of Karen Pulley in Chattanooga, Tennessee. Executed by lethal injection on December 11, 2025.
Masakazu Shibasaki	May 27, 1991	ongoing	35 years, 179 days	Japan	Stabbed two police officers to death at a police station in Nerima, in a failed attempt to steal a handgun for a planned bank robbery. He has developed symptoms of schizophrenia during his time on death row, and he is believed to be mentally incompetent.
Richard Dean Turner	October 19, 1988	March 23, 2024	35 years, 156 days	United States	Shot and killed a couple during a burglary in California in 1979, whilst under the influence of alcohol and drugs. He died in prison in 2024.
Albert Richard Holland Jr.	August 19, 1991	ongoing	35 years, 95 days	United States	Sentenced to death in Florida for fatally shooting a Pompano Beach police officer to evade arrest for sexual battery and attempted murder in 1990.
Michael J. Travaglia	June 4, 1982	September 4, 2017	35 years, 92 days	United States	Sentenced to death for the Western Pennsylvania "Kill for Thrill" murders. He died of natural causes while on death row on September 4, 2017. Travaglia's co-defendant John Charles Lesko still remains on death row.
Takeshige Hamada	March 29, 1982	June 26, 2017	35 years, 89 days	Japan	Murdered three people for insurance money in Fukuoka between 1978 and 1979, including the child of his common-law wife. Died of asphyxiation after choking on his own vomit at the age of 90.
Romell Broom	October 24, 1985	December 28, 2020	35 years, 65 days	United States	Abducted, raped, and strangled a 14-year-old girl returning from a football game in East Cleveland, Ohio, and also attempted to kidnap two of her friends. Survived an attempted execution by lethal injection on September 15, 2009, because the executioners could not find a suitable vein. He died in prison from COVID-19 complications on December 28, 2020.
Ronald Palmer Heath	December 17, 1990	February 10, 2026	35 years, 55 days	United States	Sentenced to death for the 1989 murder of Michael Sheridan during a robbery. Executed by lethal injection on February 10, 2026.
James Andrew Melton	March 18, 1983	April 13, 2018	35 years, 26 days	United States	Sentenced to death for the 1981 murder of an elderly man in Newport Beach, California. His death sentence was overturned in 2007. After two retrials, Melton was resentenced to life imprisonment without the possibility of parole in April 2018.
Makoto Sato	October 25, 1954	October 27, 1989	35 years, 2 days	Japan	Murdered the owner of a property in Shibuya over a dispute with a real estate owner. Due to the lack of physical evidence, it has been suggested that Sato was wrongfully convicted, died of illness at the age of 81.
Gregory Hunt	July 27, 1990	June 10, 2025	34 years, 318 days	United States	Sentenced to death for sexually assaulting and murdering Karen Lane in Alabama in 1988. Executed by nitrogen gas inhalation on June 10, 2025.
Richard Wade Farley	January 17, 1992	ongoing	34 years, 309 days	United States	Sentenced to death for shooting and killing seven people at the headquarters of ESL Incorporated in Sunnyvale, California in 1988. Farley used to work at ESL, where he stalked co-worker Laura Black, who filed a restraining order against him for said stalking; Farley committed the shooting after a court date for his restraining order was set. Black was injured in the shooting but survived.
Oscar Franklin Smith	July 26, 1990	May 22, 2025	34 years, 300 days	United States	Found guilty of the 1989 murders of his estranged wife and her two sons, and sentenced to death. Smith was the oldest death row inmate in Tennessee at the time of his execution by lethal injection on May 22, 2025.
Henry Eugene Hodges	January 30, 1992	ongoing	34 years, 296 days	United States	Convicted serial killer sentenced to death for the murder of Ronald Bassett in Tennessee and given two life terms for killings in Tennessee and Georgia. Suspect behind at least five more killings.
Guillermo Octavio Arbelaez	March 14, 1991	December 10, 2025	34 years, 271 days	United States	Sentenced to death for hurling his ex-girlfriend's 5-year-old son Julia Rivas off a bridge, killing him. Died in prison on December 10, 2025.
Billy Ray Waldon	March 7, 1992	ongoing	34 years, 260 days	United States	Sentenced to death for murdering three people in San Diego, California during a crime spree where he also killed a woman in Oklahoma in 1985. He became a fugitive after the murders but was captured in 1986. His convictions were overturned on January 23, 2023 due to the fact that he was improperly allowed to represent himself during trial. (Note: Waldon remains listed as a death row inmate in California, despite his death sentence being overturned in 2023.)
Edmund George Zagorski	March 27, 1984	November 1, 2018	34 years, 219 days	United States	Sentenced to death by the state of Tennessee for the 1983 murders of two men. Executed by electrocution on November 1, 2018.
Timothy Alan Dunlap	April 20, 1992	ongoing	34 years, 216 days	United States	Sentenced to death for fatally shooting a Soda Springs, Idaho bank teller during a robbery in 1991. Dunlap is also serving a death sentence in Ohio for the crossbow murder of his girlfriend.
Ronald Watson Lafferty	May 7, 1985	November 11, 2019	34 years, 188 days	United States	Self-proclaimed prophet from Utah who claimed to have been divinely mandated to murder a number of people starting with his sister-in-law and her baby daughter. A death sentence was overturned on the grounds that he was not competent to stand trial, but he was deemed competent, retried, and sentenced to death again in 1996. Lafferty, who requested to be executed by firing squad, died of natural causes while in prison awaiting execution.
David Joseph Pittman	April 25, 1991	September 17, 2025	34 years, 145 days	United States	Sentenced to death for the 1990 triple murder of his wife's family members as retribution for his wife attempting to divorce him. Executed by lethal injection on September 17, 2025.
Chadwick Scott Willacy	December 10, 1991	April 21, 2026	34 years, 132 days	United States	Sentenced to death for the burning death of Marlys Sathers during a burglary in 1990. Executed by lethal injection on April 21, 2026.
Maria del Rosio Alfaro	July 14, 1992	ongoing	34 years, 131 days	United States	Sentenced to death for murdering 9-year-old Autumn Wallace in Anaheim, California during a robbery.
Billy Leon Kearse	November 8, 1991	March 3, 2026	34 years, 115 days	United States	Billy Leon Kearse was found guilty of murdering Fort Pierce police officer Danny Parrish on January 18, 1991. Executed by lethal injection on March 3, 2026.
Robert Lee Walden Jr.	December 9, 1992	ongoing	33 years, 348 days	United States	Serial rapist sentenced to death for the 1991 rape and murder of Miguela Burhans in Tucson, Arizona. He has also murdered two more women after raping them.
Charles Lee Burton Jr.	May 8, 1992	March 10, 2026	33 years, 306 days	United States	Burton was one of six men who committed a robbery that led to the murder of 34-year-old Doug Battle. Burton was sentenced to death, and was originally scheduled to be executed on March 12, 2026, but two days before the execution date, Alabama Governor Kay Ivey commuted his death sentence to life imprisonment without the possibility of parole.
Edward Harold Schad Jr.	December 27, 1979	October 9, 2013	33 years, 286 days	United States	Oldest prisoner in Arizona death row at the time of his execution by lethal injection, aged 71. Sentenced to death for the murder and robbery of a 74-year-old man in 1978, while he was in parole for another murder ten years prior.
Pervis Tyrone Payne	February 16, 1988	November 18, 2021	33 years, 275 days	United States	Murdered an acquaintance and her 2-year-old daughter. Payne was scheduled to be executed in December 2020, but was given a reprieve until April 2021 due to the ongoing COVID-19 pandemic. In September 2020, DNA testing was ordered to investigate his claims of innocence. Payne was resentenced to two concurrent life sentences on January 31, 2022.
Eric Darnell Holmes	March 26, 1993	ongoing	33 years, 241 days	United States	Convicted of robbing and murdering two former co-workers at a Shoney's restaurant in 1989, and sentenced to death in 1993. Holmes is the longest-serving prisoner on Indiana's death row.
Joseph Martin Danks	April 2, 1993	ongoing	33 years, 234 days	United States	Sentenced to death for strangling his 67-year old cellmate at the California Correctional Institution. He has previously murdered six men in Koreatown, Los Angeles, California, earning him the moniker ″Koreatown Slasher″.
Dusty Ray Spencer	December 21, 1992	June 25, 2026	33 years, 186 days	United States	Sentenced to death for the 1992 murder of his wife in Orange County, Florida. Executed by lethal injection on June 25, 2026.
Michael Shannon Taylor	May 5, 1993	November 5, 2026	33 years, 184 days	United States	Sentenced to death for bludgeoning an elderly couple to death in Gadsden, Alabama in 1991 during a robbery. Executed by lethal injection on November 5, 2026.
Frank Athen Walls	July 30, 1992	December 18, 2025	33 years, 141 days	United States	Serial killer who murdered five people in Okaloosa County, Florida from 1985 to 1987 during robberies or sexually motivated attacks. Walls was originally sentenced to death in 1988 but was retried and sentenced to death. Executed by lethal injection on December 18, 2025.
James Erin McKinney	July 23, 1993	ongoing	33 years, 122 days	United States	McKinney and Hedlund are a half-brother pair sentenced to death for killing two people in separate burglaries in Arizona.
Charles Michael Hedlund	July 30, 1993	ongoing	33 years, 115 days	United States	McKinney and Hedlund are a half-brother pair sentenced to death for killing two people in separate burglaries in Arizona.
Charles Arnett Stevens	July 30, 1993	ongoing	33 years, 115 days	United States	Sentenced to death in California for shooting and killing four motorists along the I-580 highway.
Sakae Menda	March 23, 1950	July 15, 1983	33 years, 114 days	Japan	After being arrested for stealing rice, Menda was tortured until he confessed to the murders of a Buddhist priest and his wife, which he did not commit. He was not represented by a lawyer, no physical evidence linking Menda to the murders was ever produced, and the testimony of witnesses backing his alibi was deliberately kept out of his trial. In 1979 he was granted a retrial and in 1983 he was acquitted, becoming the first person in the History of Japan to be released from death row.
Jack Edward Alderman	June 14, 1975	September 16, 2008	33 years, 94 days	United States	Murdered his wife with a wrench in Georgia. Executed by lethal injection on September 16, 2008.
Kenji Matsumoto	September 17, 1993	ongoing	33 years, 66 days	Japan	Murdered two people during separate robberies in 1990 and 1991. He has never been executed, as he is believed to be mentally-ill due to being born with Minamata disease.
Curtis Lee Ervin	June 28, 1991	c. 2024	c. 33 years, 64 days	United States	Sentenced to death in California for stabbing a woman to death in a murder-for-hire case. Resenteced to life with the possibility of parole in August 2024 and was eventually paroled on August 25, 2025.
Eric Christopher Houston	September 21, 1993	ongoing	33 years, 62 days	United States	Sentenced to death for perpetrating the 1992 Lindhurst High School shooting in Olivehurst, California where he fatally shot a teacher and three students. Houston was a former student at Lindhurst High School; he committed the shooting after losing his job and was angered over his failure to graduate from high school or obtain a GED.
Robert Carl Foley	September 23, 1993	ongoing	33 years, 60 days	United States	Foley was sentenced to death in 1993 for murdering two brothers during a fight at his residence in Laurel County, Kentucky and sentenced to death again in 1994 for a quadruple murder in 1989, in which he hid their bodies in a septic tank at London, Kentucky.
Roderick Michael Orme	March 25, 1993	April 23, 2026	33 years, 29 days	United States	Orme, who had Welsh ancestry, was sentenced to death in Florida for the rape and murder of Lisa Redd in 1992. Died in prison on April 23, 2026.
Cleophus Prince Jr.	November 5, 1993	ongoing	33 years, 17 days	United States	Sentenced to death for the murders of six women in San Diego County, California, one of whom he raped.
Charles William Finney	November 10, 1991	November 19, 2024	33 years, 9 days	United States	Sentenced to death for the 1991 murder of Sandra Sutherland during a burglary in Temple Terrace, Florida. Died in prison on November 19, 2024.
Won Eon-sik	November 23, 1993	ongoing	32 years, 364 days	South Korea	Mass murderer who set fire to Wonju Kingdom Hall on 4 October 1992, killing 15 people and injuring 25. Longest-serving death row inmate in South Korea.
Leonardo Franqui	November 24, 1993	ongoing	32 years, 363 days	United States	Franqui and San Martin were both sentenced to death in Florida for murdering a man during a robbery in 1991. Both were also initially sentenced to death for their involvment in the 1992 murder of off-duty North Miami police officer Steven Bauer during a bank robbery, but San Martin was resentenced to life imprisonment without the possibility of parole on June 11, 1998 after a judge improperly overruled the jury's recommendation for life during his trial. Accomplices Ricardo Gonzalez and Fernando Fernandez were also sentenced to death for Bauer's murder. Like San Martin, Fernandez's death sentence was also overturned on February 25, 1999. Gonzalez is scheduled to be executed on December 1, 2026.
Pablo San Martin	November 24, 1993	ongoing	32 years, 363 days	United States	
Robin Lee Row	December 16, 1993	ongoing	32 years, 341 days	United States	Sentenced to death in Idaho for murdering her husband and two children by setting their Boise residence on fire. Row is currently the only female death row inmate in Idaho.
Bobby Joe Long	July 25, 1986	May 23, 2019	32 years, 302 days	United States	Known as "The Classified Ad Rapist" or "The Adman Rapist", kidnapped, raped and killed at least ten women in the Tampa Bay Area in Florida during an eight-month period in 1984. Executed by lethal injection on May 23, 2019.
Warren Keith Henness	January 27, 1994	ongoing	32 years, 299 days	United States	Sentenced to death in Ohio for murdering a man during a robbery in 1992. Scheduled to be executed on December 15, 2027.
Louis Bernard Gaskin	June 19, 1990	April 12, 2023	32 years, 297 days	United States	Sentenced to death in Florida for gunning down a Palm Coast couple in 1989 while dressed in a black ninja outfit to avoid identification. Executed by lethal injection on April 12, 2023.
Ralph Stephens Baze Jr.	February 4, 1994	ongoing	32 years, 291 days	United States	Sentenced to death in Kentucky for fatally shooting two Powell County police officers at his residence.
Curtis Lee Windom	November 10, 1992	August 28, 2025	32 years, 291 days	United States	Sentenced to death in Florida for the 1992 shooting deaths of his friend, his girlfriend, and her mother. Executed by lethal injection on August 28, 2025.
Thomas Warren Whisenhant	September 7, 1977	May 27, 2010	32 years, 262 days	United States	Sentenced to death for the murder of a convenience store clerk in Alabama. He later admitted to murdering a further three women in Mobile County. Executed by lethal injection on May 27, 2010. At the time of his execution, he was Alabama's longest-serving death row inmate.
Alvin Leroy Morton	March 18, 1994	ongoing	32 years, 249 days	United States	In 1992, Morton, along with three juvenile accomplices, burglarized the Hudson, Florida house of 16-year-old accomplice Christopher Walker's neighbours John Bowers and Madeline Weisser; they were murdered with a shotgun and knife respectively. Morton was sentenced to death for the murders, two accomplices received life imprisonment with the possibility of parole (one has since been paroled in 2017), and Walker was convicted of lesser charges and spent 7 years in prison before being released in 2001.
Mark Allen Geralds	April 13, 1993	December 9, 2025	32 years, 240 days	United States	Sentenced to death in Bay County, Florida for the 1989 murder of Tressa Pettibone during a burglary. Executed by lethal injection on December 9, 2025.
Victor Tony Jones	March 1, 1993	September 30, 2025	32 years, 213 days	United States	Sentenced to death for the 1990 stabbing deaths of an elderly couple during a robbery. Executed by lethal injection on September 30, 2025.
Brent Ray Brewer	June 1, 1991	November 9, 2023	32 years, 161 days	United States	Sentenced to death in Texas for the 1990 stabbing death of Robert Laminack during a robbery. Executed by lethal injection on November 9, 2023. The time between him being sentenced to death and his execution is the longest in the state.
Dayton Leroy Rogers	June 9, 1989	November 12, 2021	32 years, 156 days	United States	Rogers was convicted in May 1989 for the murders of 23-year-old Lisa Marie Mock, 26-year-old Maureen Ann Hodges, 35-old Christine Lotus Adams, 20-year-old Cynthia Devore, 26-year-old Nondace "Noni" Cervantes, and 16-year-old Riatha Gyles. Removed from death row for the final time on November 12, 2021, due in part to a new law signed by Governor Kate Brown, which limited the amount of aggravating factors required for seeking the death penalty.
Stephen Michael West	March 25, 1987	August 15, 2019	32 years, 143 days	United States	Murdered a mother-daughter pair in Tennessee in 1986. Executed by the electric chair on August 15, 2019.
Jermaine Foster	July 25, 1994	ongoing	32 years, 120 days	United States	Convicted of murdering two men during a carjacking in Florida in 1992. Foster and his three accomplices were convicted of first-degree murder in state court, but only Foster was sentenced to death while the rest were sentenced to life imprisonment. The four perpetrators were also tried and convicted of carjacking charges in federal court, marking the first federal prosecution for carjacking in the United States.
Larry Roy	August 30, 1994	ongoing	32 years, 84 days	United States	Dubbed the "Cheneyville Slasher", Roy was found guilty of the 1993 murders of his ex-girlfriend's husband and aunt in Cheneyville, Louisiana. Roy was convicted on July 19, 1994.
Bryan Maurice Jones	September 19, 1994	ongoing	32 years, 64 days	United States	Sentenced to death for the murder of four sex workers in San Diego, California, raping two of them in the processs.
Ricardo Maldonado Gonzalez	October 11, 1994	ongoing	32 years, 42 days	United States	Sentenced to death in Florida for murdering off-duty North Miami police officer David Bauer during a bank robbery in 1992. Death sentence vacated in 1997 but was resentenced to death on September 18, 1998. His accomplices Leonardo Franqui, Pablo San Martin, and Fernando Fernandez were also initially sentenced to death, but San Martin and Fernandez had their death sentences for Bauer's murder overturned in 1998 and 1999 respectively. Accomplice Pablo Abreu was sentenced to life in prison without the possibility of parole. Franqui and San Martin are also serving on death row for the murder of Raul Lopez in 1991. Scheduled to be executed on December 1, 2026.
Willie Jerome Manning	November 8, 1994	ongoing	32 years, 14 days	United States	Convicted of abducting two college students, sexually assaulting one of them, and killing both of them. Manning was also convicted of two more murders, but was later exonerated.
Donald David Dillbeck	March 15, 1991	February 23, 2023	31 years, 345 days	United States	Sentenced to death for murdering a woman in a Tallahassee shopping mall during a carjacking in 1990. Has been previously convicted of murdering a police officer in 1979. Executed by lethal injection on February 23, 2023.
Christopher Sepulvado	May 24, 1993	February 22, 2025	31 years, 274 days	United States	Tortured and murdered his stepson in 1992. Sepulvado's execution was stayed several times due to legal issues, and originally, Sepulvado was scheduled to be executed on March 17, 2025, but he died of natural causes less than a month before he could be executed.
Hubert Lester Michael Jr.	March 20, 1995	ongoing	31 years, 247 days	United States	Convicted of the 1992 kidnapping, rape and murder of Trista Eng in York County, Pennsylvania.
Erica Yvonne Sheppard	April 25, 1995	ongoing	31 years, 211 days	United States	Convicted of robbing and murdering Marilyn Meagher in Houston, Texas in 1993. Sheppard and her accomplice James Dickerson were both sentenced to death, but Dickerson died of AIDS in prison in 1999. Sheppard is the longest-serving female prisoner on Texas's death row.
Ernest Dwayne Jones	April 7, 1995	c. 2026	c. 31 years, 210 days	United States	Sentenced to death in California for raping and murdering his girlfriend's mother in 1992. Sentence reduced to life imprisonment without the possibility of parole in 2026.
James H. Roane Jr.	June 1, 1993	December 23, 2024	31 years, 205 days	United States	Convicted for the murders of multiple persons to expand the influence of their drug trafficking syndicate in Virginia between January 1992 and February 1992. Roane, Tipton and a third accomplice named Corey Johnson were sentenced to death by the US federal government, while the fourth man, Vernon Lance Thomas, was sentenced to life imprisonment without the possibility of parole. Johnson was executed by lethal injection on January 14, 2021. On December 23, 2024, outgoing President Joe Biden exercised his clemency powers and commuted the death sentences of 37 inmates on federal death row, including Roane and Tipton, and allowed them to serve life imprisonment without the possibility of parole. Roane and Tipton were the longest-serving prisoners on federal death row at the time of their commutations.
Richard Tipton	June 1, 1993	December 23, 2024	31 years, 205 days	United States	
Kerry Lyn Dalton	May 23, 1995	ongoing	31 years, 183 days	United States	Sentenced to death in California for the 1988 murder of Irene Melanie May in Live Oak Springs, California, who was tortured and stabbed. Her body was never found. Dalton's convictions were vacated in 2019. (Note: Dalton remains listed as a death row inmate in California, despite her death sentence being overturned in 2019.)
Charles Ray Crawford	April 23, 1994	October 15, 2025	31 years, 175 days	United States	Kidnapped, raped and murdered a 20-year-old college student in Mississippi in 1993 while out on bail for unrelated assault and rape charges. Executed on October 15, 2025, by lethal injection.
Robert Brian Waterhouse	September 3, 1980	February 15, 2012	31 years, 165 days	United States	Murdered and mutilated a woman in Florida while he was on parole from a life sentence for murder. Executed by lethal injection on February 15, 2012.
Robert Shawn Ingram	June 16, 1995	ongoing	31 years, 159 days	United States	Ingram was one of four people convicted of the murder of Gregory Huguley, where he was burned alive over a drug debt. One of his accomplices, Anthony Todd Boyd, was executed on October 23, 2025, after 30 years on death row. Two other men received life sentences for their roles in the crime.
Timothy Lee Hoffner	July 6, 1995	ongoing	31 years, 139 days	United States	Hoffner and Archie Dixon buried their roommate alive in 1993 in order to steal his car, and were both sentenced to death. Transitioned on death row from male to female and changed his name to Taci Vixen, though court documents still identify him as male. Scheduled to be executed on July 14, 2027.
Regis Deon Thomas	August 15, 1995	ongoing	31 years, 99 days	United States	A member of the Bloods gang, Thomas was sentenced to death in California for fatally shooting two police officers during a routine traffic stop in 1992. He also murdered a third man a year prior to the double murder.
Keith LaMar	August 23, 1995	ongoing	31 years, 91 days	United States	Sentenced to death for the murder of four prisoners during a prison riot in the Southern Ohio Correctional Facility. He has maintained his innocence. Scheduled to be executed on January 16, 2030.
Lester Leroy Bower Jr.	April 28, 1984	June 3, 2015	31 years, 36 days	United States	Convicted of the 1983 murders of four men during the theft of an aircraft. Executed by lethal injection on June 3, 2015 despite doubts on his guilt.
Gregory L. Wilson	October 31, 1988	December 6, 2019	31 years, 36 days	United States	Sentenced to death for the 1987 rape and murder of Deborah Pooley in Kenton County, Kentucky. Sentence commuted to life in prison with the possibility of parole by former Kentucky governor Matt Bevin in December 2019, but Wilson's sentence was upgraded to life imprisonment without the possibility of parole after a January 29, 2024 decision by the Kentucky Parole Board.
Antoinette Renee Frank	October 20, 1995	ongoing	31 years, 33 days	United States	Former police officer sentenced to death in Louisiana for her role in the Kim Anh murders, where she and Rogers LaCraze fatally shot a security guard and two employees, including a minor. Also suspected of killing her abusive father after a skull was found buried under her house. She is the only woman on Louisiana's death row.
William Lester Suff	November 1, 1995	ongoing	31 years, 21 days	United States	Serial killer who was sentenced to death for torturing and murdering twelve female sex workers in Riverside County, California.
Robert Roy Gordon	November 16, 1995	ongoing	31 years, 6 days	United States	Convicted of the 1994 murder-for-hire of 38-year-old Louis Davidson. McDonald and Gordon were hired by the victim's estranged wife Denise Davidson to kill her husband in midst of a divorce lawsuit and custody dispute over the couple's daughter. Denise was convicted of first-degree murder and sentenced to life imprisonment for soliciting her husband's murder, while a second woman, Susan Shores, pleaded guilty to accessory charges for helping to drive the two hitmen to Davidson's residence. Denise's boyfriend Leo Cisneros was wanted as a suspect behind the murder and he remains at large as of today.
Meryl Stanley McDonald	November 16, 1995	ongoing	31 years, 6 days	United States	
Kevin B. Burns	November 27, 1995	ongoing	30 years, 360 days	United States	Sentenced to death for the 1992 shooting deaths of Tracey Johnson and Damond Dawson during a robbery.
James Derrick O'Neal	December 14, 1995	ongoing	30 years, 343 days	United States	Sentenced to death for fatally shooting his wife in 1993. Scheduled to be executed on August 14, 2029.
Arche J. Dixon	January 11, 1996	ongoing	30 years, 315 days	United States	Dixon and Hoffner buried their roommate alive in 1993 in order to steal his car. Scheduled to be executed on June 16, 2027.
Mark Newton Spotz	March 6, 1996	ongoing	30 years, 261 days	United States	Spotz was convicted of carjacking and murdering three women during a three-day killing spree in Pennsylvania in 1995, and received three death sentences. He was also convicted of voluntary manslaughter for fatally shooting his brother during a fight.
Lyndon Fitzgerald Pace	March 7, 1996	ongoing	30 years, 260 days	United States	Serial killer who robbed, sexually assaulted, and murdered four women in Atlanta, Georgia.
Christa Gail Pike	March 30, 1996	ongoing	30 years, 237 days	United States	Only woman on death row in Tennessee. Sentenced for beating 19-year-old Colleen Slemmer to death and caving her skull with a chunk of asphalt, along with 3 accomplices. Survived a botched execution on September 30, 2026.
Tony Von Carruthers	April 26, 1996	ongoing	30 years, 210 days	United States	Sentenced to death for burying three people alive in 1994 in Memphis, Tennessee. Survived a bungled execution on May 21, 2026.
Eric Royce Leonard	June 13, 1996	ongoing	30 years, 162 days	United States	Sentenced to death in California for murdering six people in a string of robberies in Sacramento in 1991.
Anthony Todd Boyd	May 19, 1995	October 23, 2025	30 years, 157 days	United States	Sentenced to death for assisting in the 1993 burning death of Gregory Huguley over a drug debt in Talladega County, Alabama. Executed by nitrogen gas inhalation on October 23, 2025. He has maintained his innocence. His co-defendant Robert Shawn Ingram was also sentenced to death and is currently incarcerated on death row.
Gary Wayne Sutton	September 3, 1996	ongoing	30 years, 80 days	United States	Sentenced to death for shooting 24-year-old Tommy Griffinm in rural Blount County, Tennessee. He also killed Griffin's sister Connie Brannam. He has maintained his innocence.
Richard Allen Davis	September 26, 1996	ongoing	30 years, 57 days	United States	Sentenced to death for the 1993 kidnapping and murder of 12-year-old Polly Klaas in Petaluma, California. His case fueled support for California's passage of the "three-strikes law".
Michael Bernard Bell	June 2, 1995	July 15, 2025	30 years, 43 days	United States	Sentenced to death for the 1993 shooting deaths of Jimmy West and Tamecka Smith. He had mistaken West as another man who killed Bell's brother in self-defense. He had also killed a mother-son pair and his mother's boyfriend in separate incidents. Executed by lethal injection on July 15, 2025.
Thomas Lee Gudinas	June 16, 1995	June 24, 2025	30 years, 8 days	United States	Sentenced to death for the 1994 rape and murder of Michelle McGrath in Orlando, Florida. Executed by lethal injection on June 24, 2025.
James Harvey Hairston	November 15, 1996	ongoing	30 years, 7 days	United States	Sentenced to death in Idaho for murdering an elderly Bannock County couple and robbing them. Co-defendant Richard Klipfel received life imprisonment with the possibility of parole.

== False claims ==
Name	Sentence start	Sentence end	Sentence duration	Country	Description
Jean-Baptiste Mouron	1684	1784	100 years and 1 day	France	A man claimed in the 1934 edition of Ripley's Believe It or Not! to have been condemned to galleys for one hundred years and one day as a teenager, and lived to be released as a supercentarian after completing his sentence. The source claimed by Ripley, Jean Marteilhe's Mémoires d'un protestant, condamné aux galères de France pour cause de religion references the arrest and sentence to galleys of 500 Huguenots in 1684 but not Mouron's story, and actually predates his supposed release. If this story had been true, Mouron would have had the longest-served prison sentence in the world, and he would have also been the only person in human history to both survive a 100-year prison sentence and be released from prison after one century.

== See also ==
- List of longest prison sentences
- List of prisoners with whole life orders
- List of long-term false imprisonment cases

== Sources ==
- The Longest Prison Sentences Ever Served, A Blast From the Past, July 24, 2010. Lists the lengthiest sentences actually completed, with detailed case studies.
