= Michael Jackson (murderer) =

American convicted murderer (1954–2026)

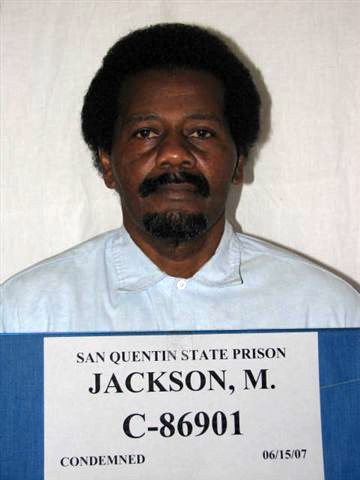
- Born: March 27, 1954; Los Angeles, California, U.S.
- Died: June 6, 2026 (aged 72); Chino, California, U.S.
- Conviction: First degree murder with special circumstances
- Penalty: Death

Details
- Victims: Police officer Ken Wrede
- Date: August 31, 1983
- Country: United States
- State: California
- Date apprehended: August 31, 1983

Michael Anthony Jackson (March 27, 1954 – June 6, 2026) was an American convicted murderer who was sentenced to death in 1984 for shooting and killing police officer Ken Wrede in West Covina, California in August 1983. He was formerly incarcerated in San Quentin State Prison before his death by natural causes in 2026.

== Murder of Officer Ken Wrede ==
Shortly after noon on August 31, 1983, West Covina Police Officer, 26-year-old Ken Wrede, responded to calls of an intoxicated man that was disturbing residents. Wrede approached the man, who identified as 29-year-old Michael Anthony Jackson. Wrede attempted to handcuff Jackson until he lunged at him. Jackson obtained a shotgun from Wrede’s patrol car and shot the officer multiple times. Before being shot, Wrede radioed for help. But by the time other officers arrived, Wrede was already dead, and the officers detained Jackson. Jackson was arrested and admitted to taking PCP-laced cigarettes earlier that day.

== Conviction ==
During the trial, Jackson's lawyers argued that he might have been severely high, which made him not legally responsible for the murder. On May 21, 1984, Jackson was found guilty of first-degree murder and sentenced to death. He still had some supporters who believed that he was not in his right state of mind when killing Wrede and that it would be cruel to him. On May 9, 2000, with Jackson's execution date approaching, the federal court of appeals concluded that if all available evidence had been presented during the trial's penalty phase, there was a reasonable chance that he might have received a sentence of life imprisonment. In a court hearing, judges criticized Jackson's lawyers for not mentioning that Jackson had been once diagnosed as schizophrenic, that the dose of PCP might render him legally not responsible for the killing. Nevertheless, Jackson stayed on death row.

California had not executed a death row prisoner since 2006, and on June 6, 2026, Jackson died while incarcerated at the California Institution for Men. He was 72.

== See also ==
- List of longest prison sentences served
