= Gerald Frank Stanley =

American murderer (born 1945)

Gerald Stanley
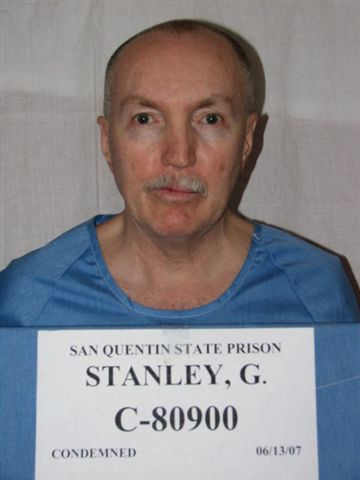
- Born: Gerald Frank Stanley; 1945 (age 80–81); United States
- Convictions: First degree murder with special circumstances Second degree murder
- Penalty: Death

Details
- Victims: 2–3
- Span of crimes: 1975–1980
- Country: United States
- State: California
- Date apprehended: August 15, 1980
- Imprisoned at: California Medical Facility, Vacaville, California

Gerald Frank Stanley (born 1945) is an American murderer and suspected serial killer who murdered his fourth wife, Cindy Rogers Stanley, in August 1980, following a four-year prison term for murdering his second wife, Kathleen Stanley, in 1975. He was also a suspect in the disappearance of his third wife, Diana Lynn.

== Murder of Kathleen Stanley ==
On January 14, 1975, Stanley approached his wife Kathleen's car. She was driving his son and her daughter to school when she pulled over at a stop sign. Stanley then opened the unlocked passenger door and fired his gun at Kathleen, killing her. He then dragged his daughter out of the car and attempted to run off with her, but instead, he was tackled by witnesses and arrested. In October 1975, Stanley was convicted of second degree murder and was sentenced to 10 years in state prison. He was paroled in October 1979 after serving 4½ years in prison.

== 1980 murder ==
Investigators were worried that he was out in society. Still, they became even more concerned when he met 29-year-old Cindy Rogers on July 3, and married her four days later on July 7. Days later, she went to the police and claimed Stanley was sexually assaulting her. When charges were not being pressed against him, she ran away and hid at her father's resort in Lake County.

Stanley eventually tracked Rogers down to the resort. On August 11, 1980, Stanley acquired a high-powered rifle and climbed a stack of trees across the road, and aimed his gun at Rogers, who was sitting poolside. He fired, killing her in front of her son, who was swimming in the pool. The jury convicted him of murdering Rogers, and he was sentenced to death in 1984.

== Appeals and later life ==
In 2008, a retrospective evaluation was called to determine whether Stanley was legally competent at the time of the murders. Stanley argued for his own competence, and attempted to replace his public defender with an attorney who would be willing to support his claim. Stanley has repeatedly called for the court to set a firm execution date, stating in a 2011 hearing that "I deserved the death penalty."

In July 2024, the Tehama County Sheriff's Office resumed searching for the body of Stanley's third wife Diana Lynn. According to his confessions, Stanley and an unnamed accomplice buried her somewhere in the Digger Creek area of Manton in the summer of 1980, but did not specify where. The search is currently ongoing.

== See also ==
- List of death row inmates in the United States
- List of serial killers in the United States
