= Eric Leonard (murderer) =

American spree killer

Eric Royce Leonard
- Born: 1969 or 1970 (age 56–57)
- Convictions: First degree murder with special circumstances (6 counts); Robbery (2 counts)
- Penalty: Death

Details
- Date: February 12–19, 1991
- Killed: 6
- Weapon: .25-caliber Beretta pistol

Eric Royce Leonard (born 1969 or 1970), also known as the "Thrill Killer", is an American spree killer who killed at least six people during two separate robberies in Sacramento in 1991.

== Crimes ==
On February 12, 1991, Leonard robbed and killed Quik Stop convenience store employees Zeid Obeid and Stephen Anderson as well as Thor Johnson, who was a customer. A week later, on February 19, Leonard robbed and killed Sarah Crook, Kyle Reynolds and Andrea Coladangelo at Round Table Pizza, all of whom were employees. Leonard would avoid capture until June 6, 1991, when he was finally arrested. Investigators were able to narrow in on him since he lived near both crime scenes and that the pistol he used was registered to his father as confirmed by ballistics.

== Aftermath ==
On June 13, 1996, Eric Leonard was convicted of murdering all six victims and was subsequently sentenced to death. In May 2007, the California Supreme Court upheld his death sentence.

== See also ==
- Capital punishment in California
- List of death row inmates in the United States § California
