= Jean Marteilhe =

French writer (1684–1777)

- Born: 1684
- Died: November 6, 1777 (aged 92–93)
- Known for: Autobiography "La Vie aux Galères"

Jean Marteilhe (1684–1777) was a French huguenot writer. Condemned to the galleys for his belief in 1701 and freed in 1713, he is one of the few former galley slaves to have written a slave narrative.
