= Mark Spotz =

American convicted spree killer (born 1971)

- 2026 Mugshot of Mark Spotz
- Born: Mark Newton Spotz; February 14, 1971 (age 55); Pennsylvania, U.S.
- Status: Incarcerated on death row
- Convictions: First-degree murder (×3); Voluntary manslaughter
- Penalty: Death

Details
- Victims: 4
- Date: January 31 – February 3, 1995
- Location: Pennsylvania
- Imprisoned at: State Correctional Institution – Phoenix

Mark Newton Spotz (born February 14, 1971) is an American convicted spree killer on death row in Pennsylvania. Spotz, who was on the run for killing his brother during a fight on January 31, 1995, embarked on a 48-hour killing spree that led to the carjacking and murders of three women across both the eastern and central regions of Pennsylvania. Spotz first killed 52-year-old June Rose Ohlinger in Schuylkill County on February 1, 1995, and a day later, on February 2, 1995, he killed 41-year-old Penny L. Gunnet in York County, as well as 71-year-old Betty Amstutz in Cumberland County on the same day of Gunnet's murder.

Spotz was arrested and charged with the murders, and he was sentenced to death for murdering the three women, while he was convicted of manslaughter for causing his brother's death. Spotz's girlfriend Christina Noland was convicted as an accomplice of the murders and received prison sentences for her role in the killings.

== Murders ==
=== Dustin Spotz ===
On January 31, 1995, Mark Spotz committed his first murder by killing his brother Dustin during a fight at their mother's home in Clearfield County, Pennsylvania. The fight occurred due to the young son of Dustin's fiancée playing a prank on Spotz by dangling a gerbil in his face, which gravely provoked Spotz into angrily cursing the boy out of his room, and the commotion prompted Dustin to come and defend the child, which escalated into a fight. Dustin reportedly used a kitchen knife to stab Spotz, who retaliated by taking a gun and shot his brother seven times, killing him on the spot.

After the murder of Dustin, both Spotz and his girlfriend Christina Noland fled the house, and entered a car driven by Spotz's stepfather, who dropped them off at the house of Spotz's friend.

=== June Ohlinger ===
On the early morning hours of February 1, 1995, Spotz and Noland headed to Pine Grove in Schuylkill County, Pennsylvania. Given that they did not have money or a vehicle, Spotz and Noland decided to steal a vehicle. At approximately 5:30am, the couple targeted 52-year-old June Rose Ohlinger, who walked out of a convenience store, and threatened her at gunpoint, forcing her to go to the passenger seat of her car. Noland got into the back of Ohlinger's car, while Spotz took the driver's seat and drove the car to a secluded area. After taking the money and jewelery from Ohlinger, Spotz ordered her to get out of the car and stand on the side of a bridge, before he shot Ohlinger in the back of the head and killed her, and kicked her body off the overpass.

=== Penny L. Gunnet ===
On February 2, 1995, a day after they murdered Ohlinger, the couple, who had arrived at York County, carjacked and killed their next victim Penny L. Gunnet, whom they pretended to seek help for directions, before she was forced at gunpoint to enter the passenger side of her car, and likewise, they also drove to a secluded area where Spotz shot the 41-year-old woman twice at close range.

After killing Gunnet, Spotz drove her car and left the area while Noland followed him in Ohlinger's car. However, Noland soon lost track of Spotz because he had better driving skills. This prompted her to abandon the vehicle and took a bus to Altoona, where she surrendered to the police. Noland admitted to the police that Spotz and herself were involved in the carjacking and killings of both Gunnet and Ohlinger. When Detective John Sancenito of the North Middletown Township police questioned Noland why did she chose to stay with Spotz during the killing spree, she stated that she feared for her safety and afraid of what Spotz might do to her if she tried to turn against him.

=== Betty Amstutz ===
On February 2, 1995, the same day he killed Gunnet, Spotz, who was alone at this point, committed his fourth and final murder by carjacking and killing 71-year-old Betty Amstutz in Cumberland County, Pennsylvania. Amstutz was kidnapped from her home by Spotz while she was putting away groceries, and forced into her car. Spotz drove Amstutz to two different banks, where she withdrew money and gave it to Spotz per his damands.

After that, Spotz drove to a store where he instructed Amstutz to buy him some clothes using her credit card, and he also forced her to use her credit card to book a room for him at a motel. Subsequently, Spotz drove further to a road outside Carlisle, Pennsylvania, where he shot Amstutz nine times, and buried her body alongside the road.

A day after the murder of Amstutz, Spotz was arrested at a motel in Carlisle. Together with Noland, Spotz was charged with multiple counts of murder for the killing of his brother and the carjacking-murders of the three women.

== Trials ==
=== Manslaughter conviction for brother's killing ===
Mark Spotz first stood trial for the murder of his brother Dustin on September 20, 1995.

On September 26, 1995, Spotz was found guilty of a lesser charge of voluntary manslaughter instead of the third-degree murder charge sought by the prosecution. Spotz was also convicted of aggravated assault, reckless endangerment and weapon use.

On October 17, 1995, Spotz was sentenced to 17 1/2 to 35 years in prison for killing Dustin. Spotz reportedly apologized in court for the homicide, but he claimed that it was done out of fear for the safety of himself and his mother. Spotz's mother and the fiancée of Dustin did not attend the court hearing.

=== Trial for Ohlinger's murder and first death sentence ===
After Spotz's manslaughter conviction for his brother's death, he was put on trial for the charge of first-degree murder in the killing of June Ohlinger, the first of his three death penalty trials for the women's deaths. Jury selection took place from Northampton County in February 1996, after the judge ordered that due to pretrial publicity, a jury from another county should be selected to hear the case in Schuylkill County (where Ohlinger was killed).

During the trial, the prosecution charged that Spotz had the motive to carjack and murder Ohlinger because he and Noland intended to flee Pennsylvania and avoid justice for Dustin's killing, but the defence argued that Spotz had no involvement in the murder and pinpointed Noland as the one solely responsible for the kidnapping and murder of Ohlinger, and that Spotz merely helped cut his girlfriend's hair and darken it to help her hide from the authorities.

On March 5, 1996, the jury found Spotz guilty of the first-degree murder of Ohlinger.

On March 6, 1996, Spotz received his first death sentence for the first-degree murder of Ohlinger.

On June 5, 1996, three months after he was condemned to death row, Spotz was sentenced to an additional prison term of 14 1/2 to 29 years for the other charges of kidnapping, robbery and carjacking in relation to Ohlinger's killing.

=== Trial for Gunnet's murder and second death sentence ===
A month later, Spotz returned to court a third time and claimed trial for the murder of Penny Gunnet before a York County jury.

On April 22, 1996, Spotz was convicted of first-degree murder a second time for the killing of Gunnet.

On April 24, 1996, Spotz was sentenced to death for the first-degree murder of Gunnet, marking his second death sentence for the killing spree.

=== Trial for Amstutz's murder and third death sentence ===
Spotz's fourth murder trial, pertaining to the killing of Betty Amstutz, took place before a Cumberland County jury.

On May 15, 1996, the jury found Spotz guilty of first-degree murder for the killing of Amstutz.

On May 16, 1996, for the first-degree murder of Amstutz, the jury unanimously voted to impose a third death sentence for Spotz.

On June 18, 1996, Spotz was formally sentenced to death a third time by Judge George E. Hoffer.

=== Guilty plea of Noland ===
Noland pleaded guilty to lesser charges of criminal homicide. She was sentenced to 12 to 20 years in prison for Ohlinger's murder and six to 30 years in prison for Gunnet's murder. Noland served 13 years behind bars before she was released in 2008.

== Appeals and death warrants ==
=== Appeals ===
On August 23, 2000, the Pennsylvania Supreme Court turned down Mark Spotz's appeal against his death sentence for the murder of Penny Gunnet.

On May 2, 2006, Spotz's appeal against his death sentence in the June Ohlinger case was dismissed by the Pennsylvania Supreme Court.

On April 8, 2014, Spotz's appeal for a new trial in his brother's killing was denied by the Clearfield County Superior Court.

On October 18, 2017, the Pennsylvania Supreme Court rejected Spotz's appeal against his death sentences.

In January 2018, Spotz and four other death row inmates from the Commonwealth filed a federal lawsuit alleging that they were being imprisoned under inhumane conditions, stating that they spent 22 to 24 hours of solitary confinement at death row everyday, and they were barred from taking part in prison programs that were accessible for the general prison population.

=== Execution attempts ===
On October 27, 1998, Governor Tom Ridge signed Spotz's first death warrant, scheduling him to be executed on December 15, 1998, but the warrant was stayed.

On March 9, 1999, Governor Ridge signed Spotz's second death warrant and re-scheduled an execution date of May 4, 1999. The execution was later stayed.

On June 20, 2001, Spotz's third death warrant was signed by Governor Ridge, who set a new execution date of August 2, 2001, but the execution did not proceed.

On May 29, 2006, Governor Ed Rendell signed Spotz's fourth death warrant and scheduled an execution date of July 25, 2006. The warrant was stayed once more due to legal issues.

On November 13, 2012, Spotz's fifth death warrant was signed by Governor Tom Corbett, who scheduled an execution date of January 8, 2013. However, a federal judge issued a stay of execution on December 21, 2012.

== Death row ==
After his sentencing, Mark Spotz was transferred to death row at the State Correctional Institution – Greene. Spotz was also one of the most notable inmates sentenced to death in Pennsylvania.

A November 2017 report showed that Spotz was one of 13 York County convicts sentenced to death and awaiting execution in Pennsylvania, and all of them were men and convicted of murder. A January 2018 report revealed that Spotz was one of 17 prisoners on Pennsylvania's death row who received three or more death sentences.

Since 2024, Spotz is presently incarcerated on death row at the State Correctional Institution – Phoenix.

== Aftermath ==
Between 1957 and 2007, Mark Spotz's spree killing stood out as one of the most shocking crimes in York County history. Spotz was additionally one of the most notorious criminals from Pennsylvania.

The killing spree of Mark Spotz and his girlfriend Christina Noland was re-enacted by true crime show Killer Couples in 2021, and the show aired on Oxygen.

== See also ==
- Capital punishment in Pennsylvania
- List of death row inmates in the United States § Pennsylvania
