= Robert Cooper =

Robert Cooper may refer to:

== Politics and law ==
- Robert Cooper (MP for Midhurst), MP for Midhurst in 1384 and 1402
- Robert Cooper (MP for Canterbury), MP for Canterbury in 1402
- Robert Bransby Cooper (1762–1845), MP for Gloucester
- Robert Archer Cooper (1874–1953), governor of South Carolina
- Robert Cooper (Canadian politician) (1858–1943), MPP in Ontario, Canada
- Robert Cooper (diplomat) (born 1947), British diplomat and author
- Robert E. Cooper Sr. (1920–2016), American judge, member of the Tennessee Supreme Court 1974–1990
- Robert E. Cooper Jr. (born 1957), American jurist, attorney general of Tennessee 2006–2014
- Robin Cooper (politician) (Robert Fitzgerald Cooper, 1936–2021), Australian politician

== Sports ==
- Rob Cooper, American college baseball coach
- Robert Cooper (footballer), English footballer

== Others ==
- Rob Cooper (blues musician), American Texas blues pianist and songwriter
- Robert Cowper (composer), also known as Robert Cooper, English Tudor composer
- Robert C. Cooper (born 1968), Canadian writer and producer, executive producer of Stargate SG-1 and Stargate Atlantis
- Robert Cooper (producer) (born 1950), British television producer
- Robert Cooper (Australian businessman) (1776–1857), Australian businessman in the early colonial era of Sydney
- Robert Cooper (priest) (1650–1733), English Anglican priest
- Robert Joel Cooper (1860–1936), buffalo hunter in the Northern Territory, Australia
- Robert S. Cooper (1932–2007), American electrical engineer and defense official
- Robert Cooper (silversmith), active in the mid 17th century, see Household silver
- Robbie Cooper (born 1969), British artist

== See also ==
- Bob Cooper (disambiguation)
- Bert Cooper (disambiguation)
- Robert Cooper Grier (1794–1870), American jurist
