= Burson =

Burson may refer to:

- Burson, California
- Charles Burson, Chief of Staff to the Vice President Al Gore
- Clare Burson, American singer-songwriter
- Colette Burson, American screenwriter
- Greg Burson, (1949-2008), American voice actor
- Harold Burson, co-founder of public relations and communications firm Burson-Marsteller
- Jay Burson, American basketball player
- Jimmy Burson (1940-2022), American football player
- Nancy Burson (1948- ), American artist
