= Robert Cowper =

Robert Cowper may refer to:

- Robert Cowper (composer) (c. 1465–1539/40), English composer
- Robert Cowper (RAAF officer) (1922–2016), flying ace of the Royal Australian Air Force
- Bob Cowper (1940–2025), Australian cricketer

== See also ==
- Robert Cooper (disambiguation)
