= Clay family murders =

1988 murder of a family in Nashville, Tennessee, United States

- Family photo of Angela Clay, Latoya Clay, and Lakeisha Clay c. 1987
- Location: Nashville, Tennessee, United States
- Date: March 28, 1988
- Attack type: Murders by shooting
- Victims: Angela Clay, 29; Latoya Clay, 9 Lakeisha Clay, 6
- Verdict: Guilty
- Convictions: First-degree murder (x3)
- Sentence: Death (Lakeisha's murder); Life imprisonment (x2; Latoya and Angela's murder)
- Convicted: Byron Lewis Black, 32

The Clay family murders occurred on March 28, 1988, when 29-year-old Angela Clay (June 10, 1958 – March 28, 1988) and her two daughters, Latoya Clay (April 4, 1978 – March 28, 1988), age nine, and Lakeisha Clay (March 8, 1982 – March 28, 1988; sometimes spelled Lakesha Clay), age six, were murdered inside their house in Nashville, Tennessee, United States. The perpetrator, Byron Lewis Black (March 23, 1956 – August 5, 2025), who was Angela's boyfriend, attacked the Clays while he was on work release for a prior incident in which he shot and wounded Angela's estranged husband.

Black was found guilty of all three counts of first-degree murder in March 1989 and was subsequently sentenced to death for murdering Lakeisha, while receiving two consecutive life sentences for the murders of Angela and Latoya. He appealed his conviction and sentence, and after exhausting his appeals, he sought to have his death sentence commuted on the grounds of intellectual disability, but these appeals were also denied.

More than 37 years after the murders, Black was executed via lethal injection at the Riverbend Maximum Security Institution on August 5, 2025.

== Murders ==
Prior to the triple murder, 29-year-old Angela Clay was separated from her husband Bennie Clay, the father of their two daughters, nine-year-old Latoya Clay and six-year-old Lakeisha Clay. Angela had a relationship with another man named Byron Lewis Black. In December of 1986, Black was involved in a dispute with Bennie whom he later shot and wounded in the shoulder. As a result, Black was convicted of malicious shooting and sentenced to two years' imprisonment with work release allowed.

On March 28, 1988, while Black was temporarily released due to his work release schedule, he entered Angela's Nashville dwelling at 1101 Wade Avenue, Apartment B, and killed all three inhabitants. Both Angela and Latoya were shot inside the master bedroom, with Angela being shot once in the head while she slept, dying within minutes. Latoya was shot in the neck and chest from about 24 inches, dying in three to ten minutes.

Inside the second bedroom, Lakeisha was shot in the chest and the pelvic area. Forensic examination showed that she tried to defend herself before being shot from a distance of six to 12 inches, dying from the gunshot wound to her chest between five and 30 minutes later. The police discovered the dead bodies after Angela's family members made a report out of concern for the victims.

== Investigation ==
Investigators eventually questioned Black as a suspect, although there was lack of biological evidence connecting him to the crime scene. But detectives later matched the bullets found in the victims to the bullet Black fired at Angela's husband Bennie Clay years earlier.

Black was therefore arrested and charged with three counts of first-degree murder on April 21, 1988. In December 1988, the prosecution formally announced that they would seek the death penalty for Black.

== Trial of Byron Lewis Black ==
2021 mug shot of Black

Despite his attempt to avoid trial on the grounds of mental incompetency, Black eventually stood trial on February 27, 1989, with jury selection commencing that same month. Black, who denied murdering the Clays, reportedly put up a defense of an alibi, and also claimed at one point that he was innocent and also found the dead bodies inside the house.

On March 8, 1989, a Davidson County jury found Black guilty of all three charges of first-degree murder. Bennie Clay, the father of the girls and Angela's husband, stated that the verdict was the best birthday present for his younger daughter Lakeisha, whose seventh birthday fell on the date of Black's guilty verdict, while Assistant District Attorney Eddie Barnard described the murders as the "most atrocious" triple murder that a jury ever came across. The sentencing trial of Black commenced the next day, with the prosecution continuing to pursue capital punishment for Black.

On March 10, 1989, for solely the charge of murdering Lakeisha Clay, Black was sentenced to death via electrocution by Judge Walter Kurtz upon the jury's unanimous recommendation for capital punishment. However, the jury deadlocked on imposing the death penalty for the murders of Angela and Latoya Clay. As a result, Judge Kurtz also handed Black two consecutive life sentences for these other two killings, in addition to 15 years for burglary and five years each for two counts of criminal use of firearms. Black was scheduled to die by electrocution on November 20, 1989, but the execution was stayed to allow Black to appeal the sentence.

Black's case marked the fifth case in six months where Davidson County prosecutors sought the death penalty. Three of these other four cases ended with plea agreements that resulted in life imprisonment while the offender in the fourth case was given a death sentence like Black, who was the 72nd person condemned to Tennessee's death row since 1977.

== Appeals ==
On August 5, 1991, the Tennessee Supreme Court rejected Byron Black's appeal against his death sentence and murder conviction. In a majority decision of 3 to 2, the court dismissed the appeal and upheld that electrocution was not a cruel and unusual punishment, and in the majority judgement, the three judges felt that the "brutal and senseless" triple murder of Angela Clay and her daughters placed Black as one of the defendants who deserved the death penalty and it was not a disproportionate punishment compared to sentences imposed in precedent cases, although the two dissenting judges did not believe that the aggravating circumstances warranting Black's death sentence were sufficiently proven by the prosecution.

On September 27, 1995, the Tennessee Court of Criminal Appeals rejected Black's appeal.

On April 8, 1999, Black's second appeal to the Tennessee Court of Criminal Appeals was also dismissed.

On October 19, 2005, Black appealed to the Tennessee Court of Criminal Appeals and cited that he had an intellectual disability that would have exempted him from the death penalty. The appeal, however, was rejected.

In 2008, a federal district court rejected Black's federal appeal. On December 15, 2011, the 6th U.S. Circuit Court of Appeals remanded Black's case to the lower federal courts for another appeal hearing.

On January 22, 2013, Black's appeal was rejected by Judge Todd J. Campbell of the U.S. District Court for the Middle District of Tennessee.

On August 10, 2017, Black's second appeal to the 6th U.S. Circuit Court of Appeals was dismissed.

On June 4, 2018, the U.S. Supreme Court rejected Black's appeal. This was the final appeal Black had left in his case, and his death sentence was thus confirmed by the U.S. Supreme Court.

In early 2022, Black appealed once again to vacate his death sentence on the grounds of intellectual disability, in light of an April 2021 law that enabled the state's death row inmates to avoid the death penalty based on intellectual disabilities under a new criteria. Unusually, Davidson County District Attorney Glenn Funk agreed with the defense lawyers of Black that he was intellectually disabled and he should not be executed. On March 29, 2022, Senior Judge Walter Kurtz rejected Black's appeal and found that he was not intellectually disabled and he was eligible to face capital punishment for the 1988 Clay family murders.

Black subsequently appealed to the Tennessee Court of Criminal Appeals against Senior Judge Kurtz's ruling. Like in the previous appeal, District Attorney Funk agreed that Black was intellectually disabled and his death sentence should be commuted to life imprisonment. However, the prosecutors representing the Tennessee Attorney General's office argued against commuting Black's death sentence, and argued that Black's case did not fit the criteria for eligibility and also stated that Black was legally barred from seeking a third adjudication of his intellectual disability claims, the latter argument which the judges questioned in return. On June 6, 2023, the Tennessee Court of Criminal Appeals once again upheld the death sentence of Black.

== Death warrants and execution stays ==
=== 2020 ===
On September 24, 2019, the Tennessee Attorney-General Herbert Slatery petitioned to the Tennessee Supreme Court to schedule the execution dates of nine prisoners on Tennessee's death row, and Byron Black was one of the nine prisoners which the state sought to execute.

On February 24, 2020, the Tennessee Supreme Court signed the death warrants of both Black and Pervis Tyrone Payne, scheduling them to be executed on October 8, 2020, and December 3, 2020, respectively. Black's lawyers argued against executing Black, citing his low IQ and both brain damage and schizophrenia, and added that Black had previously received treatment for a multitude of health conditions he experienced while on death row, including two hip replacements. The execution dates of both Payne and Black were issued four days after the state executed Nicholas Todd Sutton via the electric chair. Apart from Payne and Black, two other condemned inmates, Harold Wayne Nichols and Oscar Franklin Smith, also received execution dates of August 4, 2020, and February 4, 2021, respectively.

In April 2020, Black's lawyers sought a postponement of the execution, citing the ongoing COVID-19 pandemic in the United States and the need for more time to further pursue Black's intellectual disability claims in court. On June 12, 2020, the Tennessee Supreme Court issued a temporary reprieve for Black, postponing his execution to April 8, 2021, in light of the COVID-19 pandemic, which affected the American courts' schedules and hindered the courts from conducting a hearing to assess Black's intellectual disability claims. The other inmates similarly had their execution dates staved off due to the pandemic, and one of them, Payne, had his death sentence commuted to life imprisonment on the grounds of intellectual disability in January 2022.

While Black was still awaiting his execution, the surviving family members of Angela, Latoya and Lakeisha Clay accepted an interview in October 2020. Linette Bell, the sister of Angela, stated that she found it fair and just for Black to be sentenced to death for murdering her sister and her nieces, and she felt that it was time for Black to be executed to fulfill the ends of justice. Bell added that her sister was a "good girl" and the victims did not deserve such brutal deaths. Bell also rejected the fact that Black was intellectually disabled, pointing out that he was mentally competent enough to commit such callous murders. Retired police officer Bill Pridemore, who was one of the officers responding to the scene and found the bodies of the Clays, stated that the scene itself demonstrated the brutality of the crime, and he agreed with the death penalty for Black.

On December 3, 2020, the Tennessee Supreme Court granted an indefinite stay of execution for Black, as a result of the multiple issues caused by the COVID-19 pandemic, and also to grant more time for Black to pursue further appeals against his death sentence on the grounds of intellectual disability.

=== 2022 ===
On March 3, 2022, the Tennessee Supreme Court issued three death warrants for Black and two more convicted murderers on death row. Black's execution was rescheduled to take place on August 18, 2022, while the other two, Gary Wayne Sutton and Donald Ray Middlebrooks, were given execution dates of October 6, 2022, and December 8, 2022, respectively.

In April 2022, hours before the execution of Oscar Smith, the Tennessee Governor Bill Lee put a halt to the execution, and in May 2022, Lee further ordered a moratorium on all pending executions (including Black's) while the state conduct a review of its lethal injection protocols, after it was found that the state had failed to ensure its lethal injection drugs were properly tested.

== Execution ==
By end 2024, the Tennessee Department of Correction had developed a new lethal injection protocol, by which the prison officials would carry out lethal injection executions with doses of a single drug pentobarbital, which paved way to the possibility of resuming executions in Tennessee after the state last executed Nicholas Todd Sutton in 2020.

On March 3, 2025, the Tennessee Supreme Court issued a court order, scheduling the execution dates of four convicted murderers on the state's death row, and the list included Byron Black. Black was the second in line out of the four, with his execution date set as August 5, 2025. The other three were Oscar Franklin Smith (May 22, 2025), Donald Ray Middlebrooks (September 24, 2025) and Harold Wayne Nichols (December 11, 2025). Under Tennessee state law, Black and the other three prisoners were allowed to choose between lethal injection or the electric chair for their upcoming executions, because they were all sentenced to death before 1999. Ultimately, Middlebrooks's execution was stayed by a federal judge due to a pending appeal and Smith's execution was carried out as scheduled by lethal injection.

On July 3, 2025, Black's lawyers petitioned to a Nashville court to require the Tennessee Department of Correction to deactivate an implanted defibrillation device similar to a pacemaker during the final minutes before Black's upcoming execution, as they submitted that if left activated, the device could continue to try restarting his heart and potentially prolonging the execution to give Black a possible painful death with unnecessary suffering. On July 19, 2025, Nashville Chancellor Russell Perkins ruled that the prison officials should turn off the device prior to the execution procedure, but he also ordered the execution to proceed as scheduled, stating that he had no authority to issue a stay. In a modified ruling dated July 22, 2025, Chancellor Perkins ruled that the state should deactivate the device at a hospital on the morning of Black's scheduled execution, instead of bringing a doctor or technician to the execution chamber. This ruling, however, was overturned by the Tennessee Supreme Court, as the order of deactivating the device amounted to a stay of execution, which was not the authority of the lower court to impose, and the judges allowed the execution to move forward without turning off the device. The Nashville General Hospital declined to perform the procedure on Black.

On July 8, 2025, Black's request for a new competency hearing was denied by the Tennessee Supreme Court.

On July 11, 2025, Black petitioned for clemency from Governor Bill Lee, who had the sole prerogative to commute Black's death sentence to life without parole if he approved clemency. On August 4, 2025, the eve of Black's scheduled execution, Lee declined to grant clemency to Black. The U.S. Supreme Court also rejected Black's final appeal.

As the execution date of Black drew near, Linette Bell, the sister of Angela and aunt of both Lakeisha and Latoya, accepted an interview, in which she expressed the family's agony over the process of waiting for justice to be served. Bell was also critical of the defense's arguments to prevent their client from suffering a painful death, pointing out that her family also suffered from the pain of losing Angela and her daughters and she labelled the defense's last-minute appeals as tactical ploys to stall the execution of her sister's murderer. Similarly, Marie Bell, Angela's 88-year-old mother, stated that she wanted to see Black get executed for murdering her daughter before she herself would die, commenting that she waited too long for justice to be served. 68-year-old Bennie Clay, Angela's husband and father of both Lakeisha and Latoya, stated that he had forgiven Black but was willing to attend the execution.

On August 5, 2025, 69-year-old Byron Lewis Black was put to death by lethal injection in the Riverbend Maximum Security Institution. According to prison officials, the official time of death was 10:43am. It was about 10 minutes after the execution started and Black talked about being in pain. Asked for any last words, he replied, "No sir." but before losing consciousness, he reportedly said, "This is hurting so bad." Prior to his execution, Black ate a last meal of pizza with mushrooms and sausage, donuts and butter pecan ice cream.

After the execution of Black, Linette Bell released a statement, stating that she and her family finally found closure with Black's execution, and stated that she could not feel sorry for Black, because he never apologized for the murders of her sister and nieces throughout these 37 years and to the end, he remained silent right before his death. However, in a separate statement, Black's lawyer Kelley Henry condemned the execution, claiming that the state of Tennessee had unlawfully executed her client, whom she described as a "gentle, kind, fragile, intellectually disabled" man.

== See also ==
- Capital punishment in Tennessee
- List of people executed in Tennessee
- List of people executed in the United States in 2025

Executions carried out in Tennessee
Preceded by Oscar Franklin Smith May 22, 2025	Byron Lewis Black; August 5, 2025	Succeeded by Harold Wayne Nichols December 11, 2025
Executions carried out in the United States
Preceded by Edward James Zakrzewski II – Florida July 31, 2025	Byron Lewis Black – Tennessee; August 5, 2025	Succeeded by Kayle Barrington Bates – Florida August 19, 2025
