= Matt Rice =

American lawyer and former professional baseball player

Solicitor General of Tennessee
- Incumbent
- Assumed office March 1, 2024
- Governor: Bill Lee
- Preceded by: Andrée Blumstein

Personal details
- Born: James Matthew Rice; May 5, 1989 (age 37) Johnson City, Tennessee
- Education: Western Kentucky University (BS); University of California, Berkeley (JD)
- Profession: Lawyer, baseball player
- Baseball career

Tampa Bay Rays
- Catcher
- Bats: Right Throws: Right

MiLB debut
- June 20, 2011, for the Hudson Valley Renegades

MiLB statistics (through 2012 season)
- Batting average: .295
- Hits: 129
- Home runs: 7
- Runs batted in: 54
- Stolen bases: 7

James Matthew Rice (born May 5, 1989) is an American lawyer and former professional baseball player serving as the solicitor general of Tennessee since 2024. He previously played in Minor League Baseball for the Tampa Bay Rays.

Before being appointed as Solicitor General in March 2024, Rice was drafted in the 2011 MLB Draft as the 300th overall pick and later clerked for Supreme Court Justice Clarence Thomas.

== Baseball career ==
Rice was born on May 5, 1989, in Johnson City, Tennessee. He attended Science Hill High School in Johnson City, before committing to play division I college baseball for the Western Kentucky Hilltoppers. Rice played for Western Kentucky University from 2007 to 2011, graduating with a degree in mechanical engineering.

=== College career ===
==== 2008 season ====
While playing for the Hilltoppers, Rice led the team to the 2008 Sun Belt Conference baseball tournament. As the No. 5 seed, the Hilltoppers made it to the conference championship, beating the New Orleans Privateers 17–5.

As Sun Belt champions, Western Kentucky automatically advanced to the 2008 NCAA Division I baseball tournament. There, Western Kentucky fell to the Oklahoma State Cowboys 5–3.

==== 2009 season ====
Western Kentucky entered the 2009 Sun Belt Conference tournament as the No. 2 seed. However, the Hilltoppers fell in the semifinals to the Louisiana-Monroe Warhawks in double-elimination games, 11-3 and 4–2.

Despite falling in the Sun Belt tournament, the Hilltoppers received an at-large bid to the 2009 NCAA Division I baseball tournament. There, Western Kentucky upset the Missouri Tigers 11–5. Advancing to the next round, the Hilltoppers lost to the Ole Miss Rebels 7–4.

In the elimination bracket, Western Kentucky faced Missouri in a rematch, winning 11–6. The Hilltoppers again faced the Ole Miss Rebels, winning 10–9 to even the series. In the tie-breaker, Ole Miss bested Western Kentucky 4-1 and the Hilltoppers were eliminated.

==== 2010 MLB Draft ====
In the 2010 MLB Draft, Rice was drafted by the New York Yankees in the 50th round. However, he declined to sign with the Yankees, staying with Western Kentucky for his senior season.

==== 2011 MLB Draft ====
Rice returned for the 2011 MLB Draft, where he was picked in the 9th round as the 300th overall pick by the Tampa Bay Rays. Rice signed with the Rays on June 9, 2011.

==== Minor League career ====
From 2011 to 2012, Rice played for the Rays' minor league affiliate, the Hudson Valley Renegades. As a catcher with the Renegades, Rice was named a 2011 Mid-Season All-Star. On April 4, 2012, he was reassigned to the Bowling Green Hot Rods. With the Hot Rods, Rice was named a 2012 Mid-Season All-Star before retiring on March 30, 2013.

== Legal career ==
After retiring from professional baseball, Rice enrolled in the University of California, Berkeley School of Law. In law school, Rice was a Summer Associate with Baker Botts in 2014 and Munger, Tolles & Olson in 2015. In 2016, Rice served as a law clerk for the United States Attorneys Office before graduating at the top of his class.

After law school, Rice clerked for judge Sandra Ikuta of the United States Court of Appeals for the Ninth Circuit before joining Williams & Connolly in 2017. Rice left Williams & Connolly to clerk for Clarence Thomas from 2019 to 2020.

=== Tennessee Solicitor General ===
In 2022, Rice joined the Tennessee Attorney General's Office under Jonathan Skrmetti. In March 2024, incumbent Solicitor General Andrée Blumstein resigned, prompting Skrmetti to appoint Rice to succeed her.

==== United States v. Skrmetti ====
As Solicitor General, Rice successfully represented Tennessee before the Supreme Court in United States v. Skrmetti. The lawsuit concerns a Tennessee state law that bans minors from receiving gender-affirming hormone therapy to treat gender dysphoria. Rice persuaded the Supreme Court that the Tennessee law did not violate the Equal Protection Clause.

==== Federalist Society ====
Rice is a frequent guest speaker and conference host for the Federalist Society. On August 13, 2025, Rice hosted a conference on the Supreme Court for the Memphis Federalist Society chapter. On November 6, 2025, Rice co-hosted the 2025 Federalist Society National Lawyers Convention with Paul Clement, Kathryn Kimball Mizelle, and Scott G. Stewart.

== See also ==
- List of law clerks for the tenth seat of the Supreme Court of the United States
- List of American sportsperson-politicians
