= Waller Lansden Dortch & Davis =

American law firm

Waller Lansden Dortch & Davis, LLP
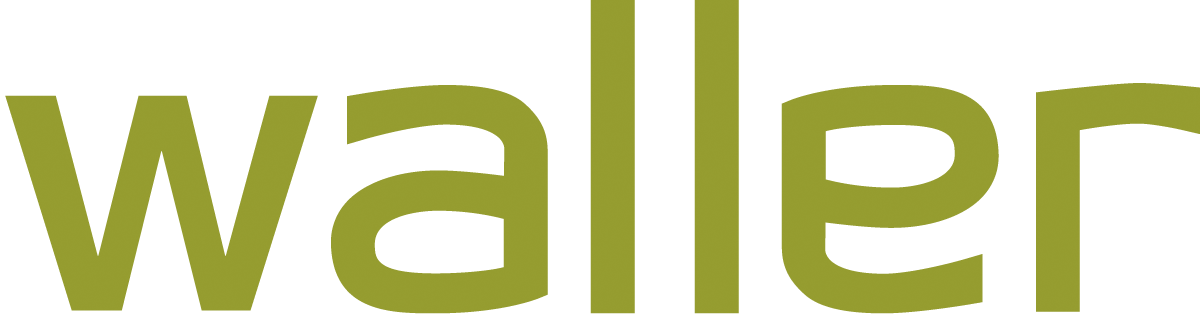
- Headquarters: Nashville City Center; Nashville, Tennessee
- No. of offices: 5 total
- No. of attorneys: 250
- Major practice areas: General practice
- Key people: Matt Burnstein, Chairman.
- Date founded: 1905
- Founder: John Pitts & K.T. McConnico
- Company type: Limited liability partnership
- Website: wallerlaw.com

Waller Lansden Dortch & Davis, LLP (often simply Waller) is a large U.S. law firm in Nashville, Tennessee with other offices in the Southern United States.

== History ==
As the oldest law firm in Nashville, Waller traced its roots back to the Nashville, Tennessee firm of Pitts & McConnico, founded in April 1905 in Nashville, Tennessee by John Pitts and K.T. McConnico. McConnico was one of the attorneys who represented the state when John T. Scopes filed an appeal with the Tennessee Supreme Court of his famous conviction in the Scopes Monkey Trial for teaching evolution in a public school.

The current firm, headquartered in Nashville City Center, is the result of growth and a series of mergers with firms throughout the Southern United States. The firm maintains additional offices in Tennessee, Alabama and Texas. The firm's early growth resulted from its handling of about 90 percent of the corporate securities work in Tennessee in 1950 through its relationships with Equitable Securities Company and J.C. Bradford & Co.

On March 1, 2023, Waller completed a combination with Holland & Knight LLP. As a result of the combination, Holland & Knight will have nearly 2,000 attorneys in 34 offices across the United States and internationally.

Following the deal, the Nashville office of Holland & Knight has more than 200 attorneys.

Holland & Knight is ranked 26th on The American Lawyer's AmLaw 200 for 2025, with a gross revenue of $2.043 billion. They also rank 31st globally in the 2024 Global 200 survey.

== Practice areas ==
With a reputation as having one of the top healthcare law practices in the nation, the firm also has attorneys engaged in corporate, mergers & acquisitions, labor and employment, real estate, bankruptcy, intellectual property, private equity and tax law.

Waller is a member of the World Services Group, an international professional services network of independent law, accounting and investment banking firms.

== Noteworthy matters and transactions ==
Waller represented Nissan Motor Corp. in its move to Tennessee and then later worked in securing the site for General Motors Corp.'s Saturn plant in Spring Hill, Tennessee.

Waller also helped start Surgical Care Affiliates and Logan's Roadhouse organize their respective initial public offerings.

When famed entrepreneur Jack Massey co-founded Hospital Corporation of America with Thomas F. Frist, Sr. and Thomas F. Frist, Jr. in 1968, he personally selected Waller to assist with the company's incorporation and later complete many healthcare mergers and acquisitions for several decades as it became the nation's largest chain of for-profit hospitals

== Notable lawyers and alumni ==
- Maclin “Mac” Davis, Jr., Partner who helped successfully represent the plaintiffs in Kidd v. McCanless before the Tennessee Supreme Court in 1955 to enforce the constitutional requirements for reapportioning seats in the state legislature. This case was heavily cited in the one man, one vote decision by the United States Supreme Court in Baker v. Carr and forced the Tennessee legislature to reapportion itself as required by the Tennessee Constitution.
- Brett Carter, 2010 Democratic nominee for the United States House of Representatives from Tennessee's 6th congressional district.
- Jim Cooper, U.S. Representative for Tennessee's 5th congressional district since 2003.
- Waverly D. Crenshaw Jr., District Court judge, and formerly Chief Judge, of the United States District Court for the Middle District of Tennessee. Was the first African-American attorney and partner at the firm.
- Alberto Gonzales, 80th United States Attorney General and the highest-ranking Hispanic American in American executive government to date.
- William M. Leech, Jr., 21st attorney general of the state of Tennessee, United States from 1978 to 1984.
- Mike Stewart, former partner and member of the Tennessee House of Representatives, representing the 52nd district since 2009. Stewart is also currently the Chair of the Tennessee House Democratic Caucus.
- Paul G. Summers, 25th attorney general of the state of Tennessee, United States from 1999 to 2006.
- Justin P. Wilson, current Tennessee state Comptroller of the Treasury and former deputy governor to Tennessee Governor Don Sundquist from 1996 until 2003.
