= Ray A. Ashley =

Former Attorney general of Tennessee

Randolph Alexander “Ray” Ashley Jr. (November 18, 1925 – July 2, 2012) was an American lawyer and public official who served as the Attorney General and Reporter of Tennessee from 1976 to 1978.

Ashley was born in Tennessee on November 18, 1925. He was a native of Dyersburg, TN, and graduated from the University of Tennessee College of Law.

In 1976, following the departure of Attorney General Milton P. Rice, Ashley was appointed Attorney General of Tennessee. He held the office until 1978, when he was succeeded by Brooks McLemore. During his time as Attorney General, Ashley oversaw the state’s representation in appellate litigation and advised state agencies on matters of law. He was notably involved in the halting of the construction of the Clinch River breeder reactor project in Oak Ridge, Tennessee.

After leaving office, Ashley returned to private life. He lived in Tennessee until his death on July 2, 2012, at the age of 86.
