= Murder of Kerrick Majors =

1987 hate crime in Tennessee

Kerrick Majors
- School portrait of Kerrick Majors c. 1986
- Born: December 22, 1972; Nashville, Tennessee, U.S.
- Died: April 26, 1987 (aged 14); East Nashville, Tennessee, U.S.
- Cause of death: Murder by stabbing
- Known for: Victim of a hate crime and anti-black racism

On April 26, 1987, Kerrick Majors, a 14-year-old African-American boy, was tortured and murdered by three white people during a racially motivated hate crime in East Nashville, Tennessee. Majors was attacked by the trio after he and his friends accidentally broke a $2 vase at a flea market. Majors was kidnapped, tortured, beaten, and stabbed to death, while his attackers yelled racial slurs at him. His body was found the following day.

Donald Ray Middlebrooks, Tammy Middlebrooks, and Robert Brewington, all white, were convicted of his murder. Donald Middlebrooks was sentenced to death, while Tammy Middlebrooks and Brewington, both of whom were juveniles at the time of the murder, received life sentences. The police were criticized for their handling of the case and were accused of being racially biased. Majors' family later sued the Metro government and said the police's slow response to Majors' disappearance led to his death.

The case was notable due to its brutal nature, alleged racial bias from the police, and since it marked a rare occasion in which a white person received a death sentence for murdering a black person. Middlebrooks was scheduled to be executed in December 2022, but his execution was later suspended. In March 2025, a new execution date was set for Middlebrooks, scheduling him to be executed on September 24, 2025. His execution was again stayed pending the conclusion of his federal litigation. If executed, Middlebrooks will be the first white person in modern Tennessee history to be executed solely for killing a black person.

== Murder ==
On the evening of Sunday, April 26, 1987, 14-year-old Kerrick Majors, accompanied by four of his friends, headed to Gallatin Road in East Nashville, Tennessee. At around 7:00 p.m., the group came across a table covered in stuff that belonged to three white homeless people: 24-year-old Donald Ray Middlebrooks, his wife, 17-year-old Tammy Middlebrooks, and their companion, 16-year-old Robert Roger Brewington Jr., who was a runaway. The trio had been setting up a flea market to sell various items. As Majors and his friends approached the table, Tammy shouted at them to leave the stuff alone. During the commotion, a vase, which was later estimated to be valued at $2, was broken. Majors and his friends began running and were chased down by the trio. The trio caught Majors, and Brewington grabbed him around his neck and head. Majors resisted and told the group they knew who he was. Brewington responded by shouting racial slurs at him. Two of Majors' friends then saw Donald Middlebrooks and Brewington take Majors back to the table, where Middlebrooks struck him across the face, knocking him to the ground. Later that night, Majors' friends told his mother, Deborah, what had happened. She then called the police.

Majors was taken into a wooded area behind a drug store on Gallatin Road. He was tied up, and Tammy stayed watching him while Donald and Brewington searched for Majors' friends. After failing to find them, they returned. The trio then made Majors strip off his clothes before beating and kicking him repeatedly. Majors was then tortured for several hours. He was slapped, beaten with brass knuckles, hit with a stick, and urinated on by either Donald or Brewington. Donald later admitted to striking Majors and hitting him on the leg with a switch. He also claimed Tammy burned Majors' nose with a cigarette lighter while Brewington urged them on. Brewington also admitted to hitting Majors in the face with a wooden stick. A letter "X" was also carved into his chest with a knife. After being tortured, Majors was stabbed twice in the chest with an assault knife. Middlebrooks later claimed that both he and Brewington stabbed Majors once each. In a previous statement, however, he claimed to have inflicted both stab wounds. Brewington claimed Middlebrooks inflicted both stab wounds. Majors then succumbed to his injuries and died at the scene.

== Aftermath ==
=== Search and discovery of body ===
After learning of her son's disappearance, Deborah Majors called the police. An officer was then dispatched to her house. He took a missing person's report; however, no search was initiated. The officer's supervisor chose not to drive to Majors' home. Furthermore, the responding officer failed to interview Majors' friend, who had witnessed the initial assault. After the police did not carry out a search, Majors' family and friends began looking for him.

The following morning, on April 27, Deborah went to a juvenile court to report Majors' disappearance. The court listed him as a runaway, and Deborah was told no one was available to look for her son. After a friend of Majors' got out of school that afternoon, the friend, Majors' mother, grandfather, and brother, all began searching for him. At around 3:30 p.m., Majors' naked body was found lying face up in a dry creek bed under a foam mattress in the woods near the area where Majors had been abducted. Bruises and burns covered his body, and the letter "X" was carved across his chest. Urine was also found on different parts of his body, and a bloody stick lay near his head. Two deep stab wounds were found in his chest a couple of inches apart. An autopsy later determined the cause of death was a stab wound to the chest. The letter "X" had been carved into his chest before the fatal stab wound had been inflicted.

=== Investigation ===
In the early hours of April 28, police met with Brewington at a donut shop after he called them and asked to meet them there. Once they arrived, he voluntarily informed them that Donald and Tammy Middlebrooks were involved in the murder. However, he denied any involvement in the crime himself. He also directed the officers to the location of the murder weapon, which was covered in bloodstains. Brewington also told police where to find Donald and Tammy. Hours later, the pair were arrested at a shack. Donald and Tammy both resisted arrest. Tammy tried to run but was bitten by a police dog and arrested. Donald refused to leave the shack and stood his ground while armed with a knife. With the aid of police dogs, he was arrested and taken to the hospital for treatment of dog bites before being transported to police headquarters.

Both Middlebrooks and Brewington blamed the other as the instigator of the crime. Middlebrooks claimed Brewington had killed Majors in a "satanic ritual" and had murdered him as an offering to the devil. He also claimed Brewington had beat, gagged, sexually molested, and stabbed Majors. He did admit to stabbing him once, however.

While awaiting sentencing, Brewington was raped by another inmate. While in prison at the Tennessee State Penitentiary, Donald Middlebrooks was attacked by black inmates in retaliation for the crime. He also received death threats. As such, he faked a suicide attempt to gain protection by slashing his own throat. The judge in his trial then agreed to a transfer request and Middlebrooks was moved from the Penitentiary to the Metro Jail.

=== Criticism of police's response ===
On May 8, 1987, Metro Police Chief Joe Casey suspended two police officers for improperly investigating the disappearance of Majors. One of the two received the harshest punishment short of termination. Sergeant Robert Graves received a suspension of thirty days without pay, and Officer Robert Swisher was suspended twenty working days without pay. Casey accused them of being lax. After Deborah called the police, Officer Swisher was dispatched to her home. He took a missing person report and notified officers in the Juvenile Division; however, he did not initiate a search, which department policy required. Sergeant Graves, Swisher's supervisor, should have headed to the scene but failed to do so. Swisher did not interview Majors' friend, who had witnessed the kidnapping. However, Casey and the Assistant Police Chief agreed that even a proper police investigation would not have saved Majors' life as they concluded he had been killed before the call was made.

Majors' grandfather reacted to the suspension with disapproval. He called the punishment a "slap on the wrist" and argued they should not have a job. As both officers were white, he claimed they would have responded differently had Majors also been white. Casey said both officers had assured him that their laxness was not due to racial bias.

On April 25, 1988, Majors' parents filed a $2 million civil damage suit against the Metro government. They asked for $1 million in compensatory damages and another $1 million in punitive damages. They argued that the slow response from the Metro Police Department to Deborah's missing persons report led to Majors' death. Police later apologized for failing to begin a full search for Majors immediately after the call was made. However, they said it appeared he had been killed before they were notified he was missing. However, according to Richard Jackson, the Majors' family attorney, an autopsy report prepared by the Metro medical examiner showed that Majors had died sometime after his mother had called the police for help.

== Trials ==
2024 Mugshot of Robert Brewington

Since Brewington and Tammy Middlebrooks were both under the age of 18 at the time of the murder, they faced a maximum of life in prison.

On June 22, 1988, Brewington was convicted of first-degree murder, aggravated kidnapping, and armed robbery. During his trial, he did not take the witness stand. On December 15, 1988, Criminal Court Judge Ann Lacy Johns imposed the maximum possible sentence on Brewington, life in prison plus 75 years. Brewington's lawyer had asked for leniency, saying he was abandoned by his mother when he was three months old, had minimal contact with his father, and lived in 25 different foster homes during his childhood. Brewington had told the police that he started drinking and using drugs when he was twelve. As of October 2026, he is still in prison but has been eligible for release since August 2023. He has a parole hearing scheduled for December 2026.

On January 27, 1989, Tammy Middlebrooks was sentenced to life in prison after pleading guilty to assisting in the kidnapping and killing of Majors. She was ordered to spend a minimum of seventeen years in prison at the Tennessee Prison for Women before being eligible for parole. Tammy Middlebrooks has since been paroled and is no longer listed as an inmate by the Tennessee Department of Correction.

In September 1989, the trial of Donald Middlebrooks began, with jury selection being made on September 11. The prosecution announced they would seek a death sentence. On September 19, 1989, Middlebrooks was found guilty of first-degree murder and aggravated kidnapping. However, he was charged with murder committed in the commission of a felony, instead of premeditated murder, with the felony being kidnapping. Both charges were considered first-degree murder, which made him eligible for the death penalty. Middlebrooks' defense attorneys argued he should be spared from a death sentence as he had severe mental illness.

On September 22, 1989, Middlebrooks was sentenced to death by electrocution. As the sentence was announced, Middlebrooks grinned and mouthed, "Thank God." According to his sister, he had been expecting a death sentence. After the sentence was announced, Majors' family expressed relief at the verdict. Majors' brother believed Middlebrooks deserved to be executed. Majors' father, John Majors, who said he was raised during the Jim Crow era, said, "I think it was one of the most fair things I've seen done in this town on behalf of a black person. Sometimes we, as blacks, do not expect justice." He expressed his belief that he had not always supported the death penalty because it was used disproportionately against black defendants, but the rising crime rates in recent years changed his mind. He also expected less commitment from the state in prosecuting a white defendant on behalf of a black family. He was impressed with the vigor of the prosecution on his family's behalf.

During the trial, prosecutors interjected race into the case. Middlebrooks' attorney later expressed his belief that some white jurors may have seen the case as an opportunity to use Middlebrooks as an example that when a white person kills a black person, the appropriate punishment will be meted out.

=== Second trial of Donald Middlebrooks ===
In 1992, Middlebrooks' death sentence was overturned due to a ruling by the Tennessee Supreme Court. The ruling tightened the rules for imposing a death sentence when someone was killed during the commission of another crime, with the Majors' case being kidnapping and murder. The Supreme Court affirmed Middlebrooks' kidnapping and felony murder convictions but entitled him to a new sentencing hearing on the murder charge. Davidson County prosecutors decided to seek the death penalty against him again. In September 1995, a new hearing was scheduled for October.

On October 2, 1995, the second trial for Middlebrooks began. During this trial, the prosecution portrayed Middlebrooks as a racist, arguing the murder was a racially motivated hate crime, citing the racial slurs made toward Majors during the attack. One of Majors' friends who had witnessed Majors being grabbed had heard Middlebrooks say to him, "shut up nigger." He also testified that he had spoken with Middlebrooks on the morning of the murder. Middlebrooks had supposedly told him that he was a member of the Ku Klux Klan, hated black people, and had once punched a black man just for saying hello to him. Middlebrooks' younger half-sister testified that he was not a racist, had black friends, and had been cared for by a black woman, whom he had loved.

On October 11, Deborah Majors, for the third time, told a jury about her son's murder, having done so at Brewington's trial and at Middlebrooks' first trial. On October 13, 1995, Donald Middlebrooks was resentenced to death. This time he showed no emotion after the announcement. In January 1998, the court upheld his death sentence. The appeals court noted that race "was an integral dynamic of the circumstances surrounding this murder."

In September 1998, a lawyer told the Tennessee Supreme Court that prosecutors had "played the race card" to convince a Davidson County jury to sentence Middlebrooks to death. In July 1999, the Tennessee Supreme Court affirmed Middlebrooks' death sentence and said the prosecution was justified in presenting evidence that race was a factor in the murder of Majors. They ruled that racial prejudice was relevant to show premeditation and a motive for the killing.

Middlebrooks continued to appeal his conviction. In his appeal, he claimed that the Tennessee Supreme Court had erred by denying his request for financial assistance to hire an expert witness and that the court should have granted his request to postpone a hearing. He also argued that he had not received effective legal counsel and that he was the lesser aggressor compared to Brewington. In January 2003, Middlebrooks' appeal was denied, and the Tennessee Court of Criminal Appeals upheld his conviction, ruling that his arguments would not have changed the jury's decision to impose the death sentence.

In 2016, Middlebrooks was one of nine Tennessee death row inmates who filed motions in state courts seeking to overturn their death sentences. Citing the 2015 United States Supreme Court ruling in Obergefell v. Hodges, which legalized same-sex marriage, the motions argued that Obergefell established that courts cannot infringe on fundamental rights, including the right to life, and that imposing a death sentence would violate that right. A Davidson County judge denied Middlebrooks's motion, and many of the other motions filed by Tennessee death row inmates were similarly denied.

== Scheduled execution of Donald Middlebrooks ==
2025 Mugshot of Donald Ray Middlebrooks

On September 20, 2019, Tennessee, which had resumed executions in 2018 after not carrying any out since 2009, filed a motion to set an execution date for Middlebrooks as he had run out of appeals. On December 30, Middlebrooks filed a response opposing the motion and asked for a certificate of commutation. The Court's consideration of both the motion and response was delayed due to the COVID-19 pandemic.

In November 2020, Middlebrooks tested positive for COVID-19. Following his positive result, the unit that housed Tennessee's death row prisoners was put on lockdown.

In February 2022, Middlebrooks' request for a certificate of commutation was denied. On February 20, the Court allowed the execution to be scheduled. His execution was scheduled for December 8, 2022.

On May 2, 2022, Governor Bill Lee issued temporary reprieves to Middlebrooks and four other Tennessee death row inmates who had been scheduled for execution in 2022. Lee issued the reprieves after discovering that the state had failed to properly test the lethal injection drugs that were set to be used in the execution of Oscar Franklin Smith in April. Lee opened an investigation into why the error had occurred. He also suspended all executions for the remainder of 2022 to allow time for the review and corrective action to be put in place. By end 2024, the Tennessee Department of Correction had developed a new lethal injection protocol, allowing the authorities to deploy a single drug combination with pentobarbital to conduct lethal injection executions, paving the way to restart executions in the near future.

In March 2025, Middlebrooks was issued a new execution date of September 24, 2025. Middlebrooks was one of four prisoners from Tennessee to have their death warrants signed. The other three were Oscar Franklin Smith (May 22, 2025), Byron Lewis Black (August 5, 2025), and Harold Wayne Nichols (December 11, 2025). On April 1, 2025, the United States District Court for the Middle District of Tennessee issued a stay of execution for Middlebrooks, pending the conclusion of his federal litigation. Smith, Black, and Nichols were all executed on their scheduled dates.

Middlebrooks remains on death row and is imprisoned at the Riverbend Maximum Security Institution, awaiting execution. If carried out, his execution would mark the first time in modern Tennessee history that a white person has been executed solely for killing a black person. In 2007, convicted murderer Daryl Holton, who was white, was executed for the murder of one black victim in Tennessee; however, his case also involved three other victims, his biological sons, all white, and his adopted daughter, who was black. All four were his children. The last time a white person was executed solely for murdering black people in Tennessee was in 1912, when 22-year-old John Bailey and 19-year-old George Shelton were hanged for lynching a black man and his two children.

== See also ==
- Capital punishment in Tennessee
- Capital punishment in the United States
- Hate crime laws in the United States
- List of death row inmates in the United States § Tennessee
- List of murdered American children
- Race and capital punishment in the United States
- Racism against Black Americans
