= Charles Burson =

American lawyer

Chief of Staff to the Vice President
- In office August 3, 1999 – January 20, 2001
- Vice President: Al Gore
- Preceded by: Ron Klain
- Succeeded by: Scooter Libby

Attorney General of Tennessee
- In office October 5, 1988 – February 1997
- Governor: Ned McWherter; Don Sundquist
- Preceded by: Michael Cody
- Succeeded by: John Walkup

Personal details
- Born: August 28, 1944 (age 81) Memphis, Tennessee, U.S.
- Party: Democratic
- Spouse: Bunny Burson
- Children: 2, including Clare
- Education: University of Michigan (BA); University of Cambridge (MA); Harvard University (JD)

Charles Wainman Burson (born August 28, 1944) is a former legal counsel and Chief of Staff to the Vice President of the United States under Al Gore. He assumed the position of legal counsel from Kumiki Gibson in February 1997 after serving almost a decade as Tennessee Attorney General. Burson was succeeded by Lisa Brown as legal counsel. In 1999 Charles Burson became Gore's Chief of Staff, replacing Ron Klain who resigned in August of that year.

Burson is the son of Josie Burson and Leo Burson. He grew up in Shelby County, Tennessee, where he graduated from Central High School in Memphis in 1962. Burson received his Bachelor of Arts in political science from the University of Michigan, his Master of Arts from the University of Cambridge, and his J.D. from Harvard Law School.

Burson was a friend of Gore for over three decades at the time of his appointment as Chief of Staff to the Vice President of the United States. He first became friends with the future Vice President in 1968 during the time Gore was studying Tennessee history at Memphis State University. Burson's parents were active in Tennessee Democratic politics, and his mother had held a position in Albert Gore Sr.'s senatorial campaign in 1958.

Before joining the White House, Charles Burson held a variety of public and private roles. From 1970 until 1988, he worked in private practice as a lawyer. During this time he sought public office on two occasions. He was elected a delegate to the Tennessee Constitutional Convention of 1977, and in 1978 he lost a race for Shelby County Commissioner to Republican Ed Williams (politician). While practicing law, Burson served as president of the Tennessee Board of Law Examiners. In 1988 he was appointed the Tennessee Attorney General by the Tennessee Supreme Court. In this capacity, Burson served on a number of public legal bodies. He was a member of the Tennessee Trade Commission, and of the Commission on the Future of the Judicial System. While Attorney General, Burson served from 1994 to 1995 as president of the National Association of Attorneys General. He also represented the state several times before the Supreme Court of the United States. One notable case he argued was Burson v. Freeman, which established a state's ability to regulate electioneering at polling sites on election day.

After his time in the White House, Burson served as Executive Vice President and General Counsel to the global agribusiness corporation Monsanto. After retiring from Monsanto, he served of counsel to the St. Louis law firm Bryan Cave. He lectured at Washington University School of Law part-time beginning in 2007 conducting a seminar on the legacy of Bush v. Gore. He became a full-time faculty member and the law school’s first senior professor of practice in 2009 and continued in that position through 2013. During this period, he taught corporations while continuing to conduct his seminar. In 2013, he began to pursue photojournalism. His most recent body of work centers on the Presidential Campaign of 2016.

He is married to artist Bunny Burson and has two daughters. He presently resides in St. Louis, Missouri.

Legal offices
| Preceded by Michael Cody | Attorney General of Tennessee; 1988–1997 | Succeeded by John Knox Walkup |
Political offices
| Preceded by Ron Klain | Chief of Staff to the Vice President; 1999–2001 | Succeeded by Scooter Libby |
