= Friends of George's v. Mulroy =

Court case filed in March 2023 to overturn the Tennessee Adult Entertainment Act

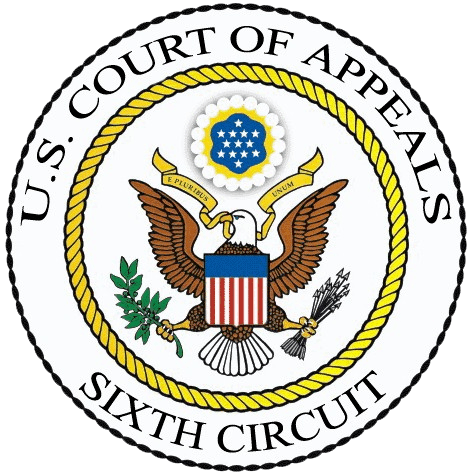
- Court: United States Court of Appeals for the Sixth Circuit
- Decided: July 18, 2024
- Docket nos.: 23-5611

Case history
- Appealed from: United States District Court for the Western District of Tennessee

Court membership
- Judges sitting: John Nalbandian; Eugene E. Siler Jr.; Andre Mathis

Case opinions
- Majority: Nalbandian, joined by Siler
- Dissent: Mathis

Friends of George's v. Mulroy was a case filed by an LGBTQ+ theatre troupe located in Memphis, Tennessee in the United States. The suit was filed against the State of Tennessee, Tennessee Attorney General Jonathan Skrmetti, and Shelby County District Attorney Steve Mulroy over the State's anti-drag legislation, which was signed into law by Governor Bill Lee on March 2, 2023.

Suit was filed on March 27, 2023, to stop the act from being enforced. The legislation was ruled unconstitutional by Judge Thomas Parker on June 2, 2023. AG Skrmetti stated after the ruling that the injunction only applied to Shelby County and is not binding on any other district in the state. He later filed an appeal of Judge Parker's ruling.

Oral arguments were heard by the United States Court of Appeals for the Sixth Circuit on February 1, 2024. On July 18, 2024, a three-judge panel in the Sixth Circuit reversed the lower court's injunction and directed the case to be dismissed, ruling 2–1 that Friends of George's did not have standing to sue because it had not shown that the law's "harmful to minors" standard would apply to performances at Friends of George's.

== Litigation details ==
On March 2, 2023, the State of Tennessee passed a law that criminalized drag performances. The law reminded many in the LGBTQ+ community of the beginning of the Gay Civil Rights era, a time rife with violence, such as the famous incident at the Stonewall Inn in 1969 in New York City. Closer to home, members of the Memphis LGBTQ+ community recalled an incident in 1971 when George Wilson was charged with permitting lewd acts and four patrons at The Door were charged with "appearing in public in the clothing of females". The charges were dismissed three weeks later, but this was by no means a singular occurrence at the venue.

Friends of George's filed a suit against the State of Tennessee, citing First Amendment protected speech on March 27, 2023. Judge Parker issued a temporary injunction on March 31, 2023, admonishing the State to explain why this law is necessary as the wording of the bill signed by Governor Lee asserts. The suits filed named both Attorney General Jonathan Skrmetti and Shelby County DA Steve Mulroy. The judge did grant Skrmetti's motion to dismiss citing the concept of absolute immunity.

On June 2, 2023, Judge Parker ruled the law unconstitutional. In an interview with MSNBC, Tennessee state Senator Jack Johnson stated that his only message in proposing the bill was "that you shouldn't be doing sexually graphic - you shouldn't be simulating sex acts in front of children." Dressing in drag does not simulate a sex act.

In an interview on Radio Memphis, Friends of George's board member Micah Winter-Cole pointed out that the TAEA attempts to legislate "something that hasn't actually happened or been a problem." When discussing their reasons for filing the suit, Winter-Cole stated, "We did this because we have to do this," and continued, adding, "Drag, in general, means a lifestyle to us, so for the state and the legislature here to pursue some kind of ban in any regard is threatening to us on all levels."

On May 15, 2023, Friends of George's received recognition in a ceremony where the Dramatists Legal Defense Fund and the Dramatists Guild of America presented the organization with the Defender Award, acknowledging FOG's legal battle against the state of Tennessee. FOG president Mark Campbell, when responding to the Dramatists Guild of America's notice that they would be co-recipients of 2023's Defender Award said, "We chose to take a stand against bigotry to defend drag artistry and our right to creative expression. The stage should remain a sacred platform where actors and performers can inspire others in a shared space. Our country is built on the bedrock of free speech, and the theater exemplifies this ideal."

In his ruling, Judge Parker made the statement, "To rewrite this law would not only violate the separation-of-powers principle, but it would also offer perverse incentives for legislators to continue their troubling trend of abdicating their responsibilities in exercising 'considered legislative judgment'." He also pointed out that the language was overbroad, which Skrmetti has used as the basis for an appeal because the same or similar language appears throughout the Tennessee Code.

Winter-Cole acknowledged that fighting this law is the right thing to do and necessary, but that Friends of George's is a theatre troupe, not a political activist group.

== Subsequent anti-drag legislation ==
Following Judge Parker's ruling, AG Skrmetti stated that it only applied to the county involved in the suit, namely, Shelby County. In an interview, he advised that the injunction is unenforceable elsewhere in the state of Tennessee. He filed an appeal on June 30, 2023. Seventeen State Attorneys General have signed statements in support of AG Skrmetti, including Alabama, Idaho, and South Carolina.

His statement about the TAEA still being in effect throughout the rest of Tennessee led the District Attorney of Blount County, Ryan K. Desmond, to issue a letter to Blount Pride telling them that participating in their scheduled September pride festival would be a violation of the law. The ACLU proceeded to sue Blount County on behalf of Flamy Grant and Blount Pride, resulting in U.S. District Judge Ronnie Greer issuing a ruling that paralleled Judge Parker's.

The city of Murfreesboro, rather than relying on the TAEA, chose to pass an ordinance that took advantage of wording that had been in the civil code and arguably made it illegal to be homosexual in public, not just to dress in drag. The ACLU filed suit on October 6, 2023, on behalf of the Tennessee Equality Project. As a result of the ordinance, four books have been banned from the Linebaugh Public Library system, and a tiered catalog system has been established. U.S. District Judge Waverly D. Crenshaw is overseeing the case and issued a ruling on October 20, 2023, stating that the city cannot enforce any code that includes "homosexuality" in the definition of "sexual conduct". In a council meeting following the decision, the city voted to remove the term "homosexual" from the code, but this did not go into effect until November 17, 2023. The case was scheduled for a jury trial, to begin on May 14, 2024, but the city settled with the ACLU, agreeing to pay $500,000 and repeal the ordinance.

On November 16, 2023, SCOTUS issued a statement regarding a Florida anti-drag bill case, Griffen v. HM Florida-ORL, LLC. The case is scheduled for trial in June 2024. SCOTUS refused to reinstate the law after the injunction that had been ordered by U.S. District Judge Gregory Presnell.

== The troupe ==
=== Founding ===
The group came together in 2010 in a reunion tribute to George's Disco, an LGBTQ+ business in downtown Memphis from December 1969 through 1987. It has a long and storied history dating from 1960, and a bar opened at 1786 Madison by a woman named Lou. The Twilight Lounge, as the original bar was called, closed in 1969 when a bartender kissed a sailor. It was purchased by two women who renamed it "The Famous Door" before it eventually became known as just "The Door" by 1970. At that point, it was owned by George Wilson.

Eventually, the club became known as "George's Disco", sometimes colloquially referred to as the "Crisco Disco". Though the Marshall Street location eventually shuttered its doors in 1987, with a location opening at 287 South Front as GDI (George's Disco Incorporated) in 1988 only to close in 1990, it is fondly remembered by many.

The October 23, 2010, gathering, coined "George's Reunion", brought together more than 1800 individuals who supported, many who remembered, the Disco. As such, organizers understood that an opening existed within the community. Friends of George's has continued to provide entertainment for the Memphis area and is a resident company of TheatreWorks.

=== Performances ===
Friends of George's has provided regular entertainment in the Memphis Area since 2010. They write, produce, and perform original comedy with a focus on drag.

Some of their shows include The Drag Boat, Drag Rocks, a Wunderland Holiday, George's Truck Stop, and DragNificent. The theatre where the troupe performs was once a movie house with the capacity to seat 900 patrons. The troupe is frequently featured in Memphis Magazine's "Five Things to Do in Memphis This Weekend" feature.

The troupe is a registered 501(c)(3) non-profit organization (since June 23, 2010, under Friends of Georges, Inc.), donating their proceeds to a selected charity with each performance. Among the recipients of their efforts are OUTMemphis, in their effort to build Memphis' first shelter dedicated to LGBTQ youth.
