= Oscar Franklin Smith =

Executed American convicted murderer (1950–2025)

- Mugshot of Smith
- Born: March 25, 1950; Ohio, U.S.
- Died: May 22, 2025 (aged 75); Riverbend Maximum Security Institution, Tennessee, U.S.
- Spouse: Judith Lynn Robirds (1985-1989)
- Status: Executed by lethal injection
- Conviction: First degree murder (3 counts)
- Penalty: Death (July 26, 1990)

Details
- Victims: 3
- Date: October 1, 1989
- Country: United States
- State: Tennessee

Oscar Franklin Smith (March 25, 1950 – May 22, 2025) was an American man convicted of first-degree murder in Tennessee and sentenced to death. Smith was scheduled to be executed on April 21, 2022; however, his execution was temporarily reprieved by Governor Bill Lee due to an oversight in the preparation for lethal injection.

Smith was incarcerated on death row at the Riverbend Maximum Security Institution, and he was executed by lethal injection on May 22, 2025.

== Early life ==
Smith was born in Ohio on March 25, 1950, and was one of seven children. His family later moved to Robertson County, Tennessee. He met Judith Lynn Robirds, a waitress at a Waffle House, who had two sons. The two married in 1985 and had a set of twins before separating in June 1989.

== Crime ==
On October 1, 1989, Smith's estranged wife, Judy Robirds Smith, and her sons Chad Burnett and Jason Burnett were murdered in Nashville, Tennessee. Judy was shot in the neck and stabbed several times. Chad was shot in the left eye, upper chest, and left torso. Jason was stabbed in the neck and abdomen. An awl was recovered at the scene, but the gun (a .22-caliber revolver) and knife were never recovered.

At the time of the incident, Smith was separated from his wife. He had also taken out an insurance policy on all three of the victims. The couple had three-year-old twins. Smith's coworkers claimed that he had threatened to kill Judy on at least twelve occasions between June and August 1989. One coworker stated that Smith threatened to kill Chad and Jason because he thought Judy treated them better than the twins. During the murders, the family tried to call the police, and Chad could be heard screaming "Frank, no!"

=== Legal proceedings ===
At trial, crime scene investigators testified they had found a bloody palm print on the sheet next to Judy Smith's body that was missing the same two fingers Oscar Smith was missing. Later, Smith hired a fingerprint expert who called this evidence into question and claimed that the investigator had made numerous errors and could not have definitively identified the print.

On July 26, 1990, Smith was sentenced to death by a jury in Davidson County. His execution was then scheduled to be carried out by electric chair on December 3, 1990, but it was stayed to allow Smith to appeal his sentence.

== Post-conviction ==
Smith was one of dozens of death row inmates who joined a lawsuit arguing that lethal injection amounts to state-sanctioned torture, and that the injection creates the sensation of drowning and burning alive.

Smith was scheduled to be executed on June 4, 2020, and February 4, 2021, but the dates were postponed due to the COVID-19 pandemic. Smith was then scheduled to be executed on April 21, 2022.

In March 2022, Smith's attorneys at the law firm Baker Botts filed a clemency petition to Tennessee Governor Bill Lee arguing that Smith's sentence should be commuted to life without parole.

As he was sentenced to death before 1999, Smith was allowed to choose his method of execution, with the options being lethal injection and the electric chair. On April 1, it was announced that Smith had declined to choose a method, meaning he would be executed by lethal injection.

In April 2022, Smith filed a motion to reopen his case due to new DNA evidence found on a murder weapon. His lawyer, public defender Amy D. Harwell, said that "DNA evidence shows that an unknown assailant, not Mr. Smith, used the bloody murder weapon found at the crime scene to murder Mr. Smith's family." Smith argues that he could not have presented the DNA evidence any sooner because the technology used to analyze the weapon is new. An investigator's fingerprint was also found on the awl. On April 11, 2022, a Tennessee court declined to reopen his case.

On April 14, 2022, Smith asked the Tennessee Supreme Court to vacate his execution date. On April 18, 2022, the Tennessee Supreme Court declined to hear Smith's appeal and denied his request to vacate his execution date. On April 19, 2022, Bill Lee said that he would not intervene in Smith's execution. On April 21, 2022, his execution was postponed due to an oversight in the preparation for lethal injection. Governor Bill Lee issued the temporary reprieve and said, "Due to an oversight in preparation for lethal injection, the scheduled execution of Oscar Smith will not move forward tonight. I am granting a temporary reprieve while we address Tennessee Department of Correction protocol. Further details will be released when available."

On May 2, 2022, Lee announced that on the day of Smith's scheduled execution he became aware that the proper procedure for preparing lethal injection had not been followed correctly. The procedure, which involves testing for endotoxins, had not been properly followed. The chemicals in the lethal injection had only been tested for potency and sterility but not for endotoxins. Because of this, he suspended all executions in Tennessee for the remainder of the year and ordered a third-party review of the lethal injection process. By end 2024, the Tennessee Department of Correction had developed a new lethal injection protocol, allowing the authorities to deploy a single drug combination with pentobarbital to conduct lethal injection executions, allowing the state of Tennessee to potentially resume executions in the near future.

== Execution ==
In March 2025, a new death warrant was signed for Smith, whose execution was rescheduled to be carried out on May 22, 2025. Smith was the first out of the four Tennessee inmates in line for execution in 2025; the other three were: Byron Lewis Black (August 5, 2025), Donald Ray Middlebrooks (September 24, 2025) and Harold Wayne Nichols (December 11, 2025). On April 30, Smith again declined to choose a preferred method of execution. Since Smith refused to choose a method, his execution was to be carried out by Tennessee's default method, lethal injection.

Oscar Franklin Smith was executed by lethal injection as scheduled on May 22, 2025. His time of death was 10:47 am. In his final statement, Smith said, "Someone needs to tell the governor the justice system doesn't work" and repeated, "I didn’t kill her" before losing consciousness. For his last meal, Smith ordered hot dogs, tater tots, and apple pie with vanilla ice cream.

In response to the execution of Smith, Judy's brother and sister expressed that they would continue to carry the sadness of losing their sister and nephews, and this served as a reminder of the "devastating consequences of domestic violence", which was a social phenomenon observed in countless other families, as well as theirs. Smith was the 19th person to be executed in the United States during the year of 2025.

== See also ==
- Capital punishment in Tennessee
- List of people executed in Tennessee
- List of people executed in the United States in 2025

Executions carried out in Tennessee
Preceded by Nicholas Todd Sutton February 20, 2020	Oscar Franklin Smith; May 22, 2025	Succeeded by Byron Lewis Black August 5, 2025
Executions carried out in the United States
Preceded by Matthew Johnson – Texas May 20, 2025	Oscar Franklin Smith – Tennessee; May 22, 2025	Succeeded by Anthony Wainwright – Florida June 10, 2025
