= George F. McCanless =

Tennessee judge (1904–1992)

McCanless in 1956

George Folsom McCanless (June 8, 1904 – June 4, 1992) was the Attorney General of Tennessee from 1954 to 1969 and an associate justice of the Tennessee Supreme Court from 1969 to 1974.

== Early life ==
McCanless was born in Morristown, Tennessee. He studied in the local schools and then attended the McCallie School. McCanless subsequently enrolled at Vanderbilt University, receiving a B.A. degree in 1926 and an LL.B. degree in 1928 and gaining admission to the bar in 1928. He was a member of the Phi Kappa Sigma fraternity and the Phi Delta Phi honor society.

== Career ==
McCanless practiced law in Morristown, TN, serving as city attorney from 1933 to 1937. He served as chancellor in the Thirteenth Chancery Division from 1937 to 1938, and as Tennessee Commissioner of Finance and Taxation from 1939 to 1946. He was appointed Attorney General and Reporter by the Tennessee Supreme Court September 23, 1954. He was reelected to a full term in 1958 and again in 1966.

He testified before the U.S. Congress expressing his opposition to school integration and federal laws enforcing the rights of African Americans to attend schools with white students.

He was appointed by the governor to fill a seat on the Tennessee Supreme Court vacated by the resignation of chief justice Hamilton S. Burnett, effective September 1, 1969. He was elected to fill the unexpired term August 6, 1970. McCanless retired from the court in 1974, one of three justices choosing not to seek reelection that year; along with the chief justice failing to gain the renomination of his the Democratic party, this led to a substantial overturning of the membership of the court.

== Personal life and death ==
McCanless died at a hospital in Nashville, Tennessee at the age of 87. He was interred at Mount Olivet Cemetery in Nashville.

Political offices
Preceded by Roy H. Beeler	Tennessee Attorney General and Reporter; 1954–1969	Succeeded by David M. Pack
Political offices
Preceded by Hamilton S. Burnett	Justice of the Tennessee Supreme Court; 1969–1974	Succeeded by Court substantially renewed
