= Bob Cooper =

Bob Cooper may refer to:

== Sports ==
- Bob Cooper (racing driver) (1935–1998), American NASCAR Cup Series driver
- Bob Cooper (speedway rider) (born 1950), English speedway rider
- Bob Cooper (rower), Australian rower
- Bob Cooper (rugby league) (1955–2022), Australian rugby league player
- Bob Cooper (surfer) (1937–2020), American/Australian surfer

== Other ==
- Bob Cooper (musician) (1925–1993), American jazz saxophonist
- Bob Cooper (politician) (1936–2004), politician and activist in Northern Ireland
- Bob Cooper (journalist) (born 1954), freelance writer and Runner's World columnist, ultramarathoner
- Bob Cooper (priest) (born 1968), Archdeacon of Sunderland

== See also ==
- Robert Cooper (disambiguation)
