= Return J. Meigs III =

Former Attorney General of Tennessee

Return Johnathan Meigs III

Return Jonathan Meigs III (April 14, 1801 – October 19, 1891) was an American lawyer, public servant, and librarian in Tennessee, who briefly held the office of Attorney General & Reporter in 1839, later became the first State Librarian of Tennessee, and was known for his abolitionist leanings.

== Early life and background ==
Meigs was born on April 14, 1801, son of John Meigs and Parthenia Clendinen. He was a member of the Meigs family, a prominent lineage in early American public life; his grandfather was Return Jonathan Meigs Sr., who had served during the Revolutionary War and later as U.S. Indian Agent among the Cherokee in East Tennessee.

== Career ==
In 1839, Meigs briefly held the office of Attorney General & Reporter of Tennessee. His term as Attorney General appears to have been short; records show that he was succeeded later in 1839 by West Hughes Humphreys.

In 1841, Meigs served as a U.S. Attorney for the Middle District of Tennessee. At some point he was also a State Senator in Tennessee (specifically during the 27th General Assembly in 1847).

From 1856 until 1860, Meigs served as the first State Librarian of Tennessee. In that role he managed state library and archival responsibilities at a time when Tennessee was formalizing its institutions of public record and preservation. His papers, held under Record Group 188 in the Tennessee State Library and Archives, show correspondence, account books, and materials connected to his work as librarian.

Meigs is also described in historical sources as having abolitionist views, or at least as part of the legal community in Tennessee which included such perspectives. He was involved in codification or revision of state statutes: for example, he was appointed along with William F. Cooper to prepare a digest of Tennessee statutes, a commission that reported to the General Assembly.

== Later life and death ==
Meigs died on October 19, 1891.
