= John Knox Walkup =

American politician

24th Tennessee Attorney General
- In office 1997–1999
- Governor: Don Sundquist
- Preceded by: Charles Burson
- Succeeded by: Paul Summers

Personal details
- Born: Fulton, Missouri, US
- Education: Centre College (BA); Harvard Law School (JD)

John Knox Walkup is a former American politician who served as the Tennessee Attorney General from 1997 to 1999. He also served as the Solicitor General for Tennessee from 1985 to 1989 and a lecturer at the Vanderbilt University Law School.
