= George W. Pickle =

American lawyer (1845–1917)

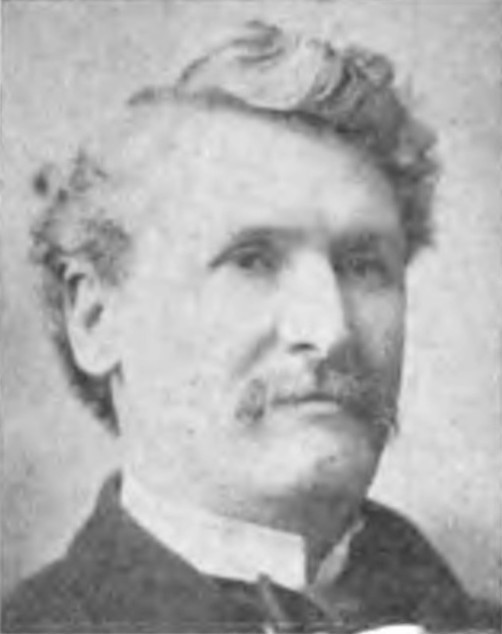
George W. Pickle

George Wesley Pickle (March 6, 1845 – April 18, 1917) was an American lawyer and Confederate veteran who served as Tennessee Attorney General and Supreme Court Reporter from 1886 to 1902. Over a sixteen-year tenure, he edited twenty-four volumes of Tennessee Supreme Court reports and represented the state in major litigation before the Supreme Court of the United States.

== Early life, education, and military service ==
Pickle was born on his family's homestead farm in Knox County, Tennessee, one of eleven children of Jonathan and Margaret (Underwood) Pickle. His father was a prosperous farmer and businessman in the county, and Pickle was of Irish and German descent. He spent part of his youth in Jefferson County, and received his early education in the common schools of Knox County and at Sweetwater, Tennessee. In 1859, he attended the East Tennessee University (now the University of Tennessee).

Shortly thereafter, the American Civil War broke out, and early in 1863, at age seventeen, Pickle enlisted as a private in Company E, Second Tennessee Mounted Infantry (also referred to as Second Tennessee Cavalry), under Colonel Henry Marshall Ashby. He was captured by Federal forces at Lancaster, Kentucky in July 1863, during Scott's raid and spent about eight months at Camp Chase and nearly twelve months at Fort Delaware, reportedly refusing an offer of release on condition of taking the oath of allegiance. He remained imprisoned until paroled near the close of the war.

After the war Pickle attended Princeton University in New Jersey for about two years, but left before graduation due to financial difficulties. From 1868 to 1870, he read law under Senator Daniel W. Voorhees at Terre Haute, Indiana, gaining admission to the bar in Tennessee in 1870.

== Legal career ==
Pickle initially practiced in Sevierville for six years, then moved to Newport and later to Dandridge. In 1876, Pickle entered into partnership with W. R. Turner, creating the firm Pickle & Turner, which became Pickle, Turner & Kennerly after W. T. Kennerly joined in 1905. The firm was regarded as one of the leading law practices in East Tennessee. Wesley T. Kennerly later served as the United States Attorney for the Eastern District of Tennessee from 1917 to 1921.

Pickle was elected Attorney General and Supreme Court Reporter of Tennessee in 1886 and was thereafter re-elected in 1894, serving until 1902. During his tenure he personally edited and twenty-four volumes of Tennessee Supreme Court reports, published between 1887 and 1903. He argued major cases on behalf of the state, including tax litigation against the Pullman Palace Car Company and various express companies in the United States Supreme Court, and represented Tennessee in the Virginia boundary line case, all of which were decided favorably to the state. As legal adviser to the governor he also played a role in the establishment of the convict lease system, planning a new penitentiary, and addressing the Coal Creek War in the early 1890s.

Pickle also served as president of the Brushy Mountain Land Company and the Bryn Mawr Mining Land Company and was active in the Masonic fraternity. He remained a zealous supporter of the Democratic Party but held no elective office other than Attorney General.

== Personal life and death ==
On June 1, 1881, Pickle married Minnie A. Fain of Dandridge, daughter of George A. and Mary Ruth Fain. They had one child, Minnie Wesley Pickle.

Pickle died in Knoxville after a period of ill health, at the age of 72. His funeral was conducted at Church Street Methodist Church.

Legal offices
Preceded by Benjamin J. Lea	Attorney General of Tennessee; 1886–1902	Succeeded by Charles T. Cates Jr.
