= Tennessee Senate Bill 1 =

2023 Tennessee law

Tennessee General Assembly
- Long title: AN ACT to amend Tennessee Code Annotated, Title 28; Title 29; Title 33; Title 34; Title 36; Title 37; Title 39; Title 40; Title 49; Title 56; Title 63; Title 68 and Title 71, relative to medical care of the young.
- Territorial extent: Tennessee
- Passed by: Tennessee Senate
- Passed: February 13, 2023
- Passed by: Tennessee House of Representatives
- Passed: February 23, 2023
- Signed by: Bill Lee
- Signed: March 2, 2023
- Effective: July 1, 2023
- Introduced: November 9, 2022
- Voting summary: 26 voted for; 6 voted against
- Voting summary: 77 voted for; 16 voted against

Summary
- Restricts gender-affirming medical care for Tennesseans under eighteen years old if it is due to a gender identity differing from their sex assigned at birth.
- Status: In force

Tennessee Senate Bill 1 (S.B. 0001) is a 2023 law in the state of Tennessee that bans gender-affirming care for Tennesseans under eighteen years of age. It was signed by Governor Bill Lee on March 2, 2023 and became law on July 1.

The bill passed the Senate on February 13 by a vote of 26-6 and the House 77-16 on February 23, 2023. In June 2025, the U.S. Supreme Court held that the Tennessee state law banning puberty blockers and hormone therapy for transgender teenagers does not violate the constitutional right to equal protection of the Fourteenth Amendment to the United States Constitution.

== Provisions ==
Senate Bill 1 prohibits medical professionals from administering gender-affirming medical care to Tennessean minors, including hormone replacement therapy (HRT) and puberty blockers, if it is due to a "...identity inconsistent with the minor's sex". It also restricts access to telehealth visits under the same conditions. The minor themselves cannot be held liable for any gender-affirming care they do receive, but their parents could face lawsuits. Medical professionals who violate the law could face penalties and fines up to $25,000.

== Reactions ==
=== Support ===
House Majority Leader William Lamberth supported Senate Bill 1 after oral arguments in United States v. Skrmetti. Senate Majority Leader Jack Johnson released an opinion piece in The Tennessean in support of Senate Bill 1. Tennessee Attorney General Jonathan Skrmetti defended it in court. Conservative media host Matt Walsh also supported Senate Bill 1 and held a rally in opposition to gender-affirming care for minors in Nashville in October 2022.

=== Opposition ===
Senate Bill 1 was opposed in United States v. Skrmetti by the American Civil Liberties Union, Lambda Legal, and Akin Gump Strauss Hauer & Feld. A temporary injunction was issued against Senate Bill 1 on June 29, 2023, but was repealed on July 8. The case was appealed to the Supreme Court. An amicus brief in opposition was sent to the Supreme Court from 11 U.S. senators and 135 U.S. representatives. Twenty-one state and federal attorney generals also opposed Senate Bill 1.

== See also ==
- United States v. Skrmetti
