= L. D. Smith =

American lawyer (1866–1932)

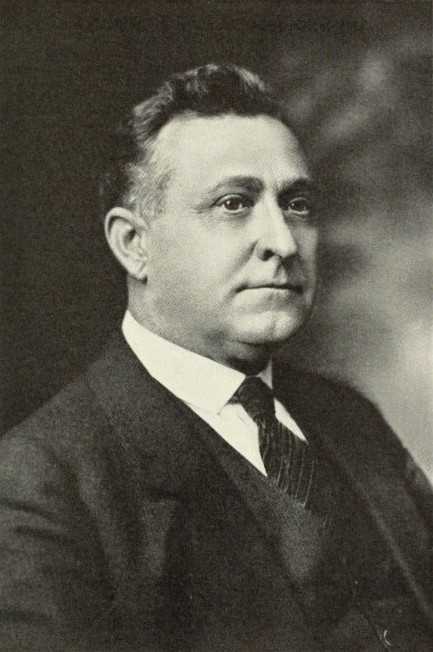
L. D. Smith

L. D. Smith, or Leonidas d'Entrecasteaux Smith (November 25, 1866 – November 7, 1932), was an American lawyer and public official who served as Attorney General and Reporter of Tennessee from 1926 to 1932.

== Early life and education ==
Smith was born in Sparta, Tennessee on November 25, 1866. He studied in the literary department at the University of Tennessee until his senior year, but then returned home to White County to enroll at the new Doyle College. Smith became its first graduate, completing an A.B. degree in 1886. After graduation, he began to read law with his father W. G. Smith and then with H. C. Snodgrass before being admitted to the bar.

== Career ==
Smith began work as a lawyer in Crossville, Tennessee representing real estate, mining and railroad firms. He served as president of the Tennessee State Bar Association in 1911. In October 1921, Smith was appointed as a special judge.

Smith was the Attorney General during Scopes trial, The State of Tennessee v. John Thomas Scopes. He made the decision not to seek a retrial following a ruling from the Tennessee Supreme Court. He was also counsel of record for Tennessee in its lawsuit against Standard Oil Company, in the case Williams v. Standard Oil Company.

== Personal life ==
Smith was the son of William Gooch Smith, a major in the Confederate army from White County, Tennessee. His father was also an attorney, and his older brother, William Templeton Smith, was a judge. His father was born in Williamsburgh, North Carolina and married Amanda Randall Templeton, the daughter of White County farmer William Thomas Templeton. Leonidas d'Entrecasteaux Smith was the third of their seven children.

Smith married Ella Wallace on November 25, 1888. They had a daughter and a son, but the latter died before his fifth birthday.

== Death ==
Smith died in office at the age of sixty-five at his home in Nashville, Tennessee, on November 7, 1932 from a "general breakdown."
