= United States v. Skrmetti =

2025 U.S. Supreme Court decision

- Supreme Court of the United States

Argued December 4, 2024 Decided June 18, 2025
- Full case name: United States of America v. Jonathan Thomas Skrmetti, Attorney General and Reporter for Tennessee, et al.
- Docket no.: 23-477
- Citations: 605 U.S. 495 (more)
- Argument: Oral argument
- Decision: Opinion

Case history
- Prior: Preliminary injunction granted in part and denied in part, L.W. v. Skrmetti, 679 F. Supp. 3d 668 (M.D. Tenn. 2023); Preliminary injunction stayed, L.W. v. Skrmetti, 73 F.4th 408 (6th Cir. 2023); Reversed and remanded, L.W. v. Skrmetti, 83 F.4th 460 (6th Cir. 2023)

Holding
- A law prohibiting medical treatments intended to provide gender-affirming care that does not align with a minor's gender assigned at birth does not discriminate based on sex or transgender status. It is not subject to heightened scrutiny under the Equal Protection Clause, and it satisfies rational basis review.

Court membership
- Chief Justice John Roberts Associate Justices Clarence Thomas · Samuel Alito; Sonia Sotomayor · Elena Kagan; Neil Gorsuch · Brett Kavanaugh; Amy Coney Barrett · Ketanji Brown Jackson

Case opinions
- Majority: Roberts, joined by Thomas, Gorsuch, Kavanaugh, Barrett; Alito (Parts I and II-B)
- Concurrence: Thomas
- Concurrence: Barrett, joined by Thomas
- Concurrence: Alito (in judgment)
- Dissent: Sotomayor, joined by Jackson; Kagan (Parts I–IV)
- Dissent: Kagan

Laws applied
- U.S. Const. amend. XIV

United States v. Skrmetti, 605 U.S. 495 (2025), is a United States Supreme Court case which held that a Tennessee state law banning puberty blockers and hormone therapy for the treatment of gender dysphoria in minors did not violate the Equal Protection Clause of the Fourteenth Amendment to the United States Constitution.

Under Tennessee’s law, a child could receive puberty blockers and hormone therapy if the medications were provided to help them conform to their sex assigned at birth, but not to treat gender dysphoria. The plaintiffs argued this constituted sex-based discrimination and thus violated the Equal Protection Clause. Tennessee argued the law did not treat people differently based on their sex, but rather based on their age and medical condition.

The district court applied heightened scrutiny and blocked the law from taking effect. The Court of Appeals for the Sixth Circuit overturned, ruling the ban did not discriminate based on sex and thus only required rational basis review.

The Supreme Court upheld the appellate court's decision on a 6–3 split, with the six conservative justices agreeing the ban was based on age and medical reason for treatment rather than on sex. Writing for the majority, Chief Justice John Roberts emphasized that the ruling was not based on an ideological opposition to transgender rights; writing for the minority, Associate Justice Sonia Sotomayor criticized the Court's decision as a failure to uphold the civil rights of transgender youth.

== Background ==
Since 2020, many states with Republican-led legislatures introduced bathroom bills and bills to limit transgender schoolchildren from participating in sports corresponding to their gender identity, and while many were defeated or challenged legally, there was public support for these bills in those states, leading the Republicans further their efforts to limit transgender rights as part of their platform as to draw in support from religious groups.

Major medical associations in the United States had opposed these bans at the time. In June 2023 the Endocrine Society released a statement opposing such bans whose signatories included the American Academy of Pediatrics, American College of Obstetricians and Gynecologists, American Urological Association, American Society for Reproductive Medicine, American College of Physicians, American Association of Clinical Endocrinology, and the American Medical Association (AMA).

On March 22, 2023, the Tennessee House of Representatives passed HB1 amending the Tennessee Code prohibiting surgical procedures and hormone therapies for transgender minors with a diagnosis of gender dysphoria. This includes puberty blockers, hormone therapy, and surgeries (though the ban on the latter was not at issue in the case). The bill does not restrain the use of puberty blockers and hormones for other medical purposes such as the treatment of precocious puberty. As of December 2024, 23 other states had similar laws in place which could be affected by the Supreme Court's decision in this case (see List of legislation restricting transgender youth health care in the United States).

Upon passage of the law, the Biden Department of Justice sought an injunction in the US District Court for the Middle District of Tennessee to prevent the law from going into effect on July 1, 2023.

The District Court granted a preliminary injunction, preventing the ban on hormones and puberty blockers from going into effect, but did not issue a ruling regarding the ban on gender-affirming surgery. The court deemed the state ban on the former two as infringing on the "fundamental rights" of parents.

=== Plaintiffs ===
The suit was brought by three transgender teens and their families as well as a Tennessee doctor who treats youth with gender dysphoria. The Biden administration joined the plaintiffs under a law which allows the federal government to join in private suits which allege violations of the Equal Protection Clause. Among the plaintiffs is a 16-year old transgender girl, identified only as "L.W.", and her parents, Brian and Samantha Williams, of Nashville, Tennessee. L.W. is a recipient of gender-affirming hormone therapy, which she says has greatly improved her quality of life, describing the gender dysphoria she experienced before treatment as "real-life body horror", and saying that her treatment allows her to "feel normal". The Tennessee state ban forces the Williams family to travel out-of-state for L.W.'s hormone treatments. Biden administration Solicitor General Elizabeth Prelogar advocated for the plaintiff's right to "be a girl" in Tennessee. Samantha Williams accused Tennessee lawmakers of hypocrisy, as they had championed "parental rights" with regard to COVID-19, but sought to restrict parental rights via HB1, saying, "They made this medical decision for our child."

The Biden administration argued in favor of the plaintiffs before the Supreme Court in December 2024. After President Donald Trump was inaugurated in January 2025, the Trump administration informed the Supreme Court on February 7, 2025, that it had changed the United States' stance and no longer supported the plaintiffs. The Trump administration nonetheless urged the justices to issue a decision on the case.

=== Sixth Circuit ===
The District Court's ruling was appealed to the US Court of Appeals for the Sixth Circuit. In a 2–1 decision in July 2023, the Sixth Circuit stayed the lower court's decision to grant a preliminary injunction, applying rational basis review. Chief Judge Jeffrey Sutton wrote that the Tennessee state government was likely to succeed upon their appeal and that the right of parents to control the medical care of their children is not a fundamental right because it is not "deeply rooted in this Nation's history and tradition", a standard set by the Supreme Court in Washington v. Glucksberg (1997). Judge Helene White concurred in part and dissented in part, arguing that the Tennessee law is "likely unconstitutional based on the Plaintiffs’ theory of sex discrimination" and that she would not stay the injunction but rather narrow its scope. However, she agreed that the "District Court abused its discretion in granting a statewide preliminary injunction".

By a 2–1 vote in September 2023, the Sixth Circuit panel reversed the district court's preliminary injunction, with Sutton again writing for the majority and White again dissenting.

== Legal analysis ==
The plaintiffs advanced two lines of argument by which Tennessee's HB1 violates the Equal Protection Clause of the Fourteenth Amendment: that it discriminates by sex, and that it discriminates by transgender status, which they contend is a "suspect" (or "quasi-suspect") class. Either of these forms of discrimination would trigger a heightened scrutiny standard of review which the law would not survive, according to the plaintiffs' arguments. Gender discrimination has a lower standard of review than racial discrimination: namely, intermediate scrutiny since Craig v. Boren (1976).

A separate due process argument was raised before the lower courts but the Supreme Court declined to consider it.

=== Sex discrimination ===
The plaintiffs argued that the Tennessee law engages in facial sex discrimination. Because the law allows the use of puberty blockers and hormones for reasons unrelated to transition, they argued, a patient's sex becomes a determining factor in deciding whether these treatments are permissible. For example, a male adolescent would be permitted to take testosterone as a treatment for delayed puberty, but the same medication would be disallowed for a patient whose birth sex is female (taking it for the purposes of inducing physical changes consistent with a masculine or nonbinary gender identity). The government and families also pointed to the Supreme Court's decision in Bostock v. Clayton County (2020), which upheld that both sexual orientation and gender identity are necessarily covered by the Title VII of the Civil Rights Act of 1964's bar on sex discrimination.

Tennessee denied that the law draws classifications based on sex, arguing that it instead draws a distinction according to the purposes for which a treatment is given, distinguishing between "minors seeking drugs for gender transition and minors seeking drugs for other medical purposes".

=== Discrimination on transgender status ===
The plaintiffs further argued that the bill warrants heightened scrutiny because it discriminates against transgender individuals who, they argued, constitute at least a quasi-suspect class. In identifying whether a group constitutes a suspect or quasi-suspect class, the plaintiffs stated that the courts should look to four criteria:

- The group has historically been discriminated against or have been subject to prejudice, hostility, or stigma.
- They possess an immutable or highly visible trait.
- They lack political power.
- The group's distinguishing characteristic does not inhibit it from contributing meaningfully to society.

The plaintiffs argued that transgender people as a group met all four criteria.

Tennessee denied that the bill discriminates on transgender status, arguing again that it distinguishes only different medical uses, and pointing out that, for example, a transgender youth would be permitted to use puberty blockers for purposes unrelated to gender transition (such as to treat precocious puberty). The state further argued that even if the bill were considered to discriminate on transgender status, the court should not "get back in the fraught business of creating suspect classes".

Legal experts considered it very unlikely that the court would accept the plaintiffs' argument in identifying transgender people as a quasi-suspect class, given that it had been decades since the court identified a new class as suspect or even quasi-suspect.

== Supreme Court ==
On November 6, 2023, the United States petitioned the Supreme Court to hear this case on appeal. The Supreme Court granted certiorari on June 24, 2024. Whereas the government's petition alleged a violation of the Equal Protection Clause, the plaintiffs filed a separate petition for certiorari, which the court did not grant, which additionally presented the theory that the bill violated the Due Process Clause by denying parents the right to make medical decisions for their children.

On February 7, 2025, the Department of Justice under the Trump Administration reversed its previous stance under the Biden Administration, claiming in a letter to the Supreme Court that the Tennessee law does not violate equal protection based on sex or any other characteristic, but maintained that the Court should still proceed with ruling on the case. Prior to the letter's issuance, legal experts predicted that with oral arguments having already taken place, such a reversal would have little impact on the case.

=== Amicus briefs ===
Amicus briefs filed for the petitioners, arguing against the ban, were submitted by the American Psychological Association, the American Academy of Pediatrics, the American Medical Association, and the World Professional Association of Transgender Health (WPATH), among other medical organizations. The Endocrine Society filed a brief stating the ban "irreparably harms adolescents with gender dysphoria by denying crucial care to those who need it".

Briefs supporting the respondents in favor of the ban included the State of Kentucky with 21 other states, the Alliance Defending Freedom, and the Family Research Council, among others.

The State of Alabama, which was in the middle of litigation regarding its own laws limiting medical treatment for transgender youth, filed an amicus brief arguing that the Justice Department had strategically sought review in the Tennessee case in part avoid disclosure of evidence in the Alabama case. The federal government, Alabama claimed, had inappropriately relied on WPATH’s guidelines, which were influenced by strategic legal considerations rather than grounded in the best available scientific evidence. The state pointed to internal documents and public statements suggesting that some of these guidelines were adopted with an eye toward influencing judicial outcomes rather than strictly adhering to empirical research, in part based on coordination between WPATH and the U.S. Department of Health and Human Services.

The Guardian reported in November 2024 that four of the doctors that were testifying in favor of Tennessee's ban, namely Paul Hruz, Michael Laidlaw, James Cantor, and Stephen B. Levine, had previously been reprimanded by various courts across the country as "conspiratorial, deeply biased, far off and deserving very little weight", three of them had never provided healthcare to transgender youth, and who LGBTQ+ advocates and trans healthcare experts say repeatedly peddle misinformation about transgender health care. Additionally, an analysis of the amicus briefs by SPLC found that 19% of them had been filed by designated anti-LGBTQ+ hate groups and another 10% had been filed by "groups and individuals associated with a network of anti-LGBTQ+ pseudoscience purveyors."

=== Oral arguments ===
Oral arguments were heard on December 4, 2024. Matt Rice, Tennessee's Solicitor General, argued for the Respondents. Prelogar represented the government, and was joined by ACLU attorney Chase Strangio who argued for the private plaintiffs. Strangio is the first known transgender person to make oral arguments before the Supreme Court of the United States.

From their lines of questioning, court observers opined that Justices Elena Kagan, Sonia Sotomayor and Ketanji Brown Jackson appeared to favor the arguments made by the plaintiffs whereas Justices Clarence Thomas, Samuel Alito, Brett Kavanaugh and John Roberts appeared to favor the arguments made by Tennessee. The putative tacks of Justices Amy Coney Barrett and Neil Gorsuch were unclear; Gorsuch, who had written the majority opinion in Bostock, did not ask any questions during the session. Court observers noted that Barrett appeared to be sympathetic to the question of whether the law violates parent's rights to make medical decisions for their children, despite it not being a question in this particular case. This led some to believe that, should the court rule that Tennessee's law does not constitute sex discrimination in Skrmetti, the law could still be challenged again with a parental rights claim and may be more successful with that argument instead.

Justice Jackson cited parallels between the Skrmetti case and Loving v. Virginia in her questioning, noting a similarity between the overturned Virginia law, which the state argued did not discriminate based on race as it applied to all races, and the Tennessee law, which the state argued did not discriminate based on sex as it applied to all minors seeking gender-affirming care for the purposes of gender transition. Jackson suggested that the Court could be "undermining the foundations of some of our bedrock equal protection cases" with their decision in Skrmetti.

=== Decision ===
On June 18, 2025, the Supreme Court ruled 6–3 to uphold the Sixth Circuit's determination that Tennessee's law did not violate the Equal Protection Clause.

The Chief Justice, John Roberts, joined by Justices Clarence Thomas, Samuel Alito, Neil Gorsuch, Brett Kavanaugh, and Amy Coney Barrett, wrote the majority opinion, stating in part: "Our role is not 'to judge the wisdom, fairness, or logic' of the law before us, but only to ensure that it does not violate the equal protection guarantee of the Fourteenth Amendment. Having concluded it does not, we leave questions regarding its policy to the people, their elected representatives, and the democratic process." The majority found that the Tennessee law classified the ban around age and medical needs, neither of which fell under a protected class that would be subject to heightened review such as intermediate or strict scrutiny. The majority also raised concerns on the benefits and downsides of gender affirming care for youth, citing the 2024 Cass Review which was commissioned by England's National Health Service and found unresolved questions on these treatments. Roberts wrote that: "Recent developments only underscore the need for legislative flexibility in this area." The decision did not rule on whether transgender individuals were a protected class, and left open the parents' ongoing challenge that the Tennessee law violates parents' rights under the 14th Amendment.

Justice Amy Coney Barrett filed a concurring opinion arguing that transgender status should not be recognized as a suspect or quasi-suspect class, which the majority opinion did not address. Barrett argued that transgender people were not marked by "obvious, immutable, or distinguishing characteristics as race or sex" and were an "insufficiently discrete and insular minority" that had not proven de jure discrimination.

Justices Sonia Sotomayor, Elena Kagan, and Ketanji Brown Jackson dissented. Sotomayor stated that the Court's decision "invites legislatures to engage in discrimination by hiding blatant sex classifications in plain sight." Referencing Barrett's opinion, Sotomayor wrote, "those searching for more evidence of de jure discrimination against transgender individuals, need look no further than the present. The Federal Government, for example, has started expelling transgender servicemembers from the military and threatening to withdraw funding from schools and nonprofits that espouse support for transgender individuals."

== Response ==
=== Political ===
Following the ruling, Senate minority leader Chuck Schumer criticized the decision as part of a "cruel crusade against trans Americans." Representative Summer Lee condemned the ruling, saying that "trans youth and their health care are under attack — and now our highest court has joined in on the assault." Representative Brittany Pettersen wrote that "as a mom, I can't imagine the pain these families navigate as they're denied the care their children need. Trans kids, like all kids, deserve the freedom to reach their greatest potential."

Illinois Governor JB Pritzker decried the ruling, saying that "in a time of increasing overreach and hateful rhetoric, it's more important than ever to reaffirm our commitment to the rights and dignity of the LGBTQ+ community." Pritzker also reassured trans people in the state that "Illinois has enshrined protections to meet this very moment". Representative Sarah McBride, who is transgender, criticized the ruling and said that it "undermines doctors" and that "politicians and judges are inserting themselves in exam rooms." Representative Becca Balint said that she had to educate and reassure Democratic colleagues who were feeling unsure about how to talk about the transgender community, saying "for any member who doesn't have someone close to them who is a transgender American, there's a lack of confidence there in talking about the issue."

Following the ruling, a rally was held near the Supreme Court building in Washington which had hundreds of people in attendance, including Senators Jeff Merkley and Ed Markey, both of whom gave speeches. Senator Merkley said the ruling was "just wrong" and Markey said "today, hate won".

Representative Jan Schakowsky said that "the court's decision may force families living in Tennessee and other states with restrictions on gender-affirming care for youth to leave their homes to ensure their kids can access medically necessary care." Representative Pramila Jayapal said the ruling puts "a cruel and politically motivated policy over the lives of people." Senate minority whip Dick Durbin promised to "double down on [his] fight for trans kids to thrive." Other Democratic representatives, including Mark Pocan, Jerry Nadler, and Frank Pallone, also released statements denouncing the decision.

Adrian Shanker, who led the LGBTQI+ health policy at the Department of Health and Human Services (HHS) during the Biden administration, said that the court's decision was "part of an avalanche of attacks on trans people and bodily autonomy."

Representative Marjorie Taylor Greene praised the ruling and urged Congress to pass her proposed bill which would ban gender-affirming care for minors nationwide. Jonathan Skrmetti, the defendant in the case, commemorated the ruling, saying "voters' common sense prevailed over judicial activism."

Senator Tom Cotton commended the Supreme Court for "upholding a state's right to protect kids from barbaric transgender procedures." Senator Mike Lee said that the ruling was about "protecting kids from surgical mutilation", and Attorney General Pam Bondi said that it would "protect children from genital mutilation."

=== Advocacy organizations ===
Chief of staff for the Human Rights Campaign Jay Brown criticized the ruling and compared it to the challenge to legalized gay marriage, "which confronted setbacks for years as it worked to change hearts and minds before eventually breaking through." Jennifer Levi, the senior director of transgender and queer rights at GLAD Law, said that "when the political system breaks down and legislatures bow to popular hostility, the judiciary must be the Constitution's backbone."

Kristina Rasmussen and Stanley Goldfarb of Do No Harm, an organization group that advocates against gender-affirming care for minors, celebrated the ruling, saying it "should end the debate over laws like Tennessee's" while reaffirming their commitment to advocating for similar laws in other states.

=== Medical organizations ===
The World Professional Association for Transgender Health called the decision "a dangerous setback for transgender health and human rights in the United States."

A joint statement by the Endocrine Society, the American Academy of Pediatrics, the American College of Obstetricians and Gynecologists, the American College of Physicians, the American Psychiatric Association, and the National Association of Pediatric Nurse Practitioners said that they were "disappointed" in the court's decision and that "decisions about medical care must be based on individualized assessments by qualified professionals in consultation with the patient and their parents or legal guardians and guided by well-designed medical evidence."

Susan J. Kressly, the president of the American Academy of Pediatrics, also gave a separate statement saying the ruling "will have profound and far-reaching consequences" and that "regardless of today's legal ruling — the science still supports gender-affirming care, children will still need it."

== Aftermath ==
Prior to the decision, Trump had issued Executive Order 14168, "Defending Women from Gender Ideology Extremism and Restoring Biological Truth to the Federal Government", which, among other edicts, required that the State Department issue U.S. passports with only "male" or "female" gender options corresponding to the applicant's biological sex, reversing prior policies that allowed transgender persons to select their preferred gender or an "X" option for other gender preferences. In the challenge to this part of the executive order, judge Julia Kobick of the United States District Court for the District of Massachusetts issued an injunction in June 2025 on the government from acting on this executive order in regards to passports, which was appealed to the First Circuit. In light of Skrmetti, the government sought to dissolve the order on the basis of the Skrmetti decision, claiming the executive order should only be reviewed under the weaker rational basis that the Supreme Court. Judge Kobick declined to remove the order, finding the government had failed to demonstrate why a rational basis should be used instead for this case.

== In the media ==
In 2025, a new documentary featuring ACLU attorney Chase Strangio, Heightened Scrutiny, premiered at the Sundance Film Festival. The film documents Strangio's work on the United States v. Skrmetti case.

== See also ==
- List of LGBTQ-related cases in the United States Supreme Court
- Chiles v. Salazar
- LGBT rights in the United States
- Transphobia in the United States
- 2020s anti-LGBTQ movement in the United States
- Geduldig v. Aiello
- West Virginia v. B. P. J. (2026)
- Little v. Hecox (2026)
