= Nashville City Center =

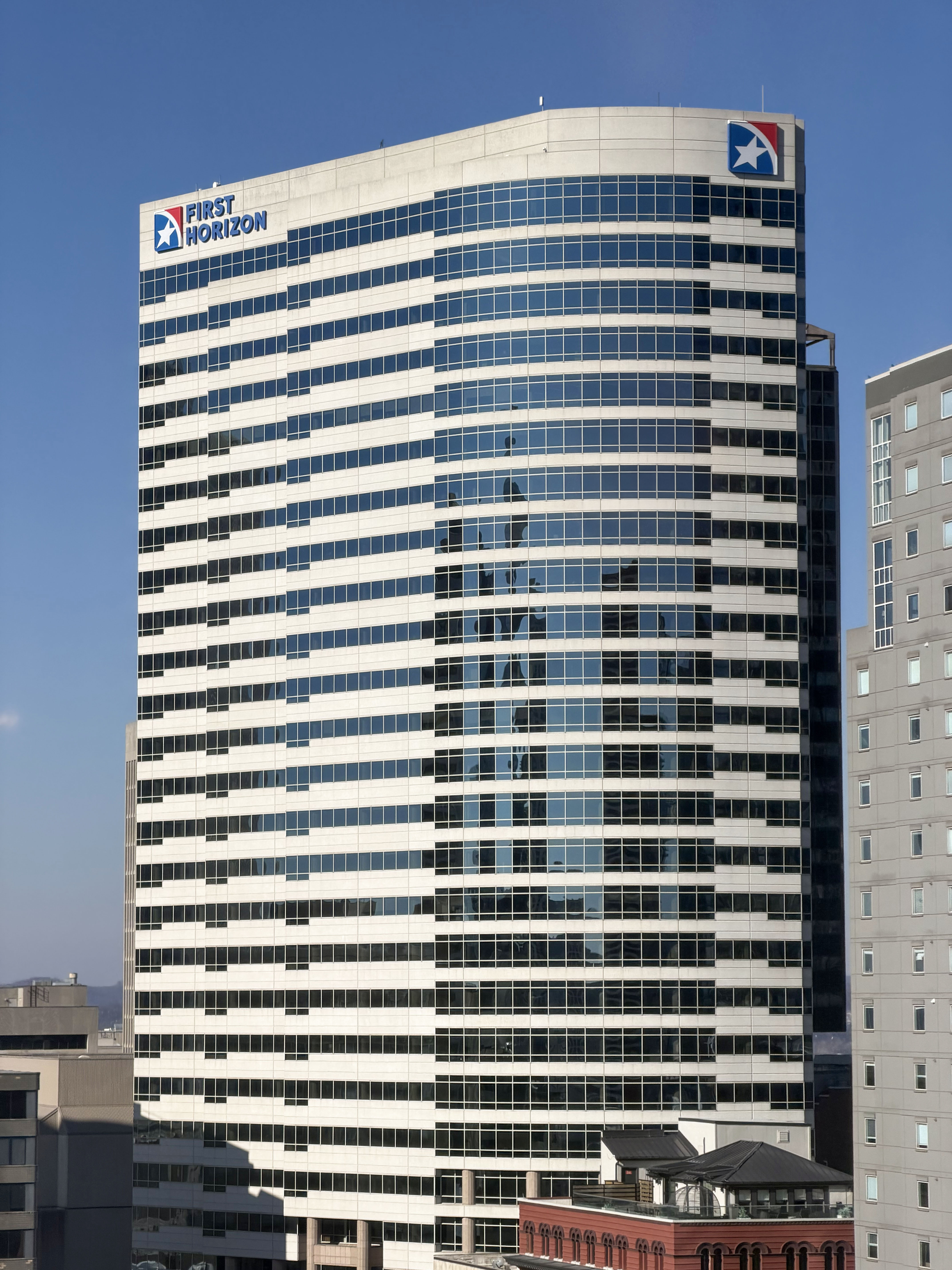
- Interactive map of the Nashville City Center area

General information
- Type: Office
- Location: 511 Union Street; Nashville, Tennessee; United States
- Coordinates: 36.1639°N 86.7817°W
- Completed: 1988
- Owner: CapRidge Partners
- Operator: 511 Group

Height
- Roof: 402 ft (123 m)

Technical details
- Floor count: 27
- Floor area: 480,449 sq ft (44,635.2 m^{2})
- Lifts/elevators: 11

Design and construction
- Architects: The Stubbins Associates, now KlingStubbins
- Structural engineer: Stanley D. Lindsey and Associates, Ltd.

Nashville City Center is a 27-story Class A office tower in Nashville with 480,000 square feet of commercial office space and 800 structured parking spaces. Designed by The Stubbins Associates, Inc., the building was completed in 1988. The logo for First Horizon Bank is at its peak.

The tower was purchased by Miami-based Parmenter Realty Partners for $84 million in 2008.

In March 2019, Texas-based real-estate investment firm CapRidge Partners purchased the tower for $105.3 million.

In November 2013, the tower was sold to Alliance Partners HSP LLC, an affiliate of Honolulu-based The Shidler Group for $103 million.

The 511 Group manages the property.

== Notable tenants ==
- First Horizon Bank
- Warner Music Group
- Waller Lansden Dortch & Davis, LLP

== See also ==
- List of tallest buildings in Nashville
