= W. J. Michael Cody =

American attorney and politician (1936–2024)

W. J. Michael Cody (March 13, 1936 – September 15, 2024) was an American attorney and public official who served as United States Attorney for the Western District of Tennessee (1977–1981), Tennessee Attorney General (1984–1988), and a member of the Memphis City Council (1975–1977). A longtime partner at Burch, Porter & Johnson in Memphis, he was part of the legal team that represented Martin Luther King Jr. during the sanitation workers’ strike in 1968.

== Early life and education ==
Cody was born in Memphis, Tennessee, and graduated from East High School (1954) and Southwestern at Memphis (now Rhodes College) in 1958. He earned his J.D. from the University of Virginia School of Law in 1961, then returned to Memphis to join Burch, Porter & Johnson.

== Career ==
Except for periods in public service, Cody practiced at Burch, Porter & Johnson from 1961 onward, handling complex litigation, investigations, and regulatory matters. He was a member of Martin Luther King Junior's local legal team in 1968, supporting the city's sanitation workers' strike. He also helped to found what became Memphis Area Legal Services, and later co-chaired the Tennessee Commission on Ethics.

Cody served on the Memphis City Council from 1975 to 1977. President Jimmy Carter appointed him U.S. Attorney for the Western District of Tennessee (1977–1981). In 1984, the Tennessee Supreme Court appointed him Attorney General and Reporter, a post he held until 1988.

== Death ==
Cody died in Memphis on September 15, 2024, at age 88, after a long illness with Parkinson’s disease.
