= Paul Summers =

American lawyer

Paul G. Summers (born March 28, 1950) served as attorney general of the state of Tennessee, United States, from 1999 through September 2006. He previously served as a Judge of the Court of Criminal Appeals (1990–1999) and as a District Attorney.

Summers declined to seek re-appointment when his term ended in 2006, and in October 2006 he joined the Nashville law firm Waller Lansden Dortch & Davis, LLP.

He had a long and distinguished career in the military, and was awarded the Legion of Merit and a Meritorious Service Medal with Oak Leaf Clusters.

== Education ==
- J.D., University of Tennessee College of Law, 1972
- Bachelor's degree, Mississippi State University, 1968

== Personal ==
Summers has one son, Paul I. Summers.

Legal offices
Preceded by John Knox Walkup	Attorney General of Tennessee; 1999–2006	Succeeded by Robert E. Cooper, Jr.
