= Robert E. Cooper Sr. =

American judge

Justice of the Tennessee Supreme Court
- In office 1974–1990

Personal details
- Born: October 14, 1920 Chattanooga, Tennessee, U.S.
- Died: July 10, 2016 (aged 95) Signal Mountain, Tennessee, U.S.
- Spouse: Catherine Kelly Cooper

Robert Elbert Cooper Sr. (October 14, 1920 – July 10, 2016) was an American judge. He was a justice of the Tennessee Supreme Court from 1974 until his retirement in 1990. Cooper was born in Chattanooga, Tennessee, and attended the University of North Carolina (1946) and Vanderbilt University (1949). He was the chairman of the Tennessee Judicial Council and served on the Sixth Judicial Circuit (1953–1960) and Tennessee Court of Appeals (1960–1974).

Robert E. Cooper Sr. died on July 10, 2016, at his home on Signal Mountain, Tennessee, following a brief illness.

His son, Robert E. Cooper Jr., is the former Attorney General of Tennessee, serving from 2006 until 2014.
