= Kumiki Gibson =

American lawyer

- Education: Harvard University; Northeastern University
- Occupation: Lawyer
- Known for: Chief Counsel to 45th Vice President of the United States Al Gore.

Kumiki Gibson is a lawyer, originally from Buffalo, New York. She was named Counsel to the Governor of New York State by Governor Andrew Cuomo on September 3, 2019. She was previously the Chief Counsel to 45th Vice President of the United States Al Gore and formerly the Vice President and General Counsel of Johns Hopkins University.

Prior to serving as a State executive, Gibson served as Senior Vice President of Administration and Governance, Chief Governance Officer, and Counselor to the President of the National Urban League, where she oversaw the development of a new strategy to advance the mission of the civil rights organization. She was also a litigation partner at Williams & Connolly, a Washington, D.C. law firm. During the Clinton Administration, she served as legal counsel to Vice President Al Gore from 1994 to 1997. She started her trial career at the United States Department of Justice.

Gibson has served in a variety of positions in the private, not-for-profit, and public sectors, most recently as the Commissioner of the New York State Division of Human Rights, the State agency charged with enforcing the State's Human Rights Law. She was appointed to that post in January 2007 by Governor Eliot Spitzer and confirmed unanimously by the New York State Senate several months later. During her tenure as Commissioner, Gibson revamped the State agency, reducing backlogs and making it more effective in fighting systematic forms of discrimination. After Spitzer resigned from office in March 2008, Gibson tendered her resignation and left her post in April 2008.

Gibson is serving on the board of directors of the National Trust for Historic Preservation, having been one of the founding Board members of the National Trust Community Investment Corporation, having been a board member of the National Law Center on Homelessness & Poverty, and having served on the Washington, D.C. Convention Center Authority Board, the District of Columbia Commission on Judicial Disabilities and Tenure, and the Administrative Council of the United States.
