= Robert E. Cooper Jr. =

American politician (born 1957)

26th Attorney General of Tennessee
- In office November 1, 2006 – October 1, 2014
- Governor: Phil Bredesen; Bill Haslam
- Preceded by: Paul Summers
- Succeeded by: Herbert Slatery

Personal details
- Born: Robert Elbert Cooper Jr. January 19, 1957 (age 69) Chattanooga, Tennessee, U.S.
- Party: Democratic
- Relatives: Robert E. Cooper Sr. (father)
- Education: Princeton University (AB); Yale University (JD)

Robert Elbert Cooper Jr. (born January 19, 1957) is an American lawyer who served as Tennessee Attorney General. He was appointed by the Tennessee Supreme Court and sworn in by William M. Barker on November 1, 2006. The court declined to reappoint him for a second term, instead choosing Herbert Slatery as his successor. Cooper left office on October 1, 2014. Cooper is a member of the Democratic Party.

== Early life and education ==
Robert Elbert Cooper Jr. was born on January 19, 1957. He is a native of Chattanooga, Tennessee. He graduated from the Baylor School in 1975. His father, Robert E. Cooper Sr., served on the Tennessee Supreme Court from 1974 to 1990.

Cooper attended Princeton University, where he was chairman of The Daily Princetonian. His 75-page senior thesis was titled "Wealth Neutrality and the Funding of Education in New Jersey". In 1979, he graduated magna cum laude with an AB in economics. After leaving Princeton, Cooper worked as a reporter for The Raleigh Times in North Carolina. He later graduated with a JD from Yale Law School, where he was managing editor of the Yale Law Journal, and clerked for Louis F. Oberdorfer on the United States District Court for the District of Columbia.

== Career ==
Before being nominated to the position of Attorney General, Cooper was Legal Counsel to Governor Phil Bredesen from 2003 to 2006. In addition to providing legal advice to the Governor, he coordinated the legal affairs of the executive branch for the Governor, assisted in the development and implementation of legislation, advised on judicial appointments, and reviewed requests for executive clemency and extradition.

Prior to his appointment as Legal Counsel to Governor Bredesen, Cooper was an attorney and partner of the law firm Bass, Berry & Sims, PLC based in Nashville where he dealt in corporate, constitutional and regulatory litigation. He has worked as an adjunct professor at Vanderbilt University Law School.

Legal offices
| Preceded by Paul G. Summers | Attorney General of Tennessee; 2006–2014 | Succeeded by Herbert Slatery |
