= William M. Leech Jr. =

American lawyer and politician (1935–1996)

William M. Leech Jr. (November 1935 – June 11, 1996) was an American attorney and public servant in Tennessee, who served as the state's Attorney General & Reporter from 1978 to 1984. He played a significant role in judicial and constitutional reform in Tennessee and in developing state divisions for environmental enforcement, antitrust, and consumer protection.

== Early life and education ==
Leech was born in November 1935 in Charlotte, Tennessee. He obtained a Bachelor of Science degree from Tennessee Technological University in 1958, where he also played on the football team. After working as a high school teacher and coach for four years, he served two years in the United States Army stationed in Germany during the Cold War era. He earned a Doctor of Jurisprudence from the University of Tennessee College of Law in 1966.

== Legal and public service career ==
Following law school, Leech established a private practice in Columbia, Tennessee. He served as Assistant District Attorney for the 11th Judicial Circuit from 1967 to 1970. He was Municipal Judge of Columbia from 1970 to 1974. In 1971, Leech was a delegate to the Tennessee Constitutional Convention and served as its president. He again served as delegate (and chairman of the Judicial Articles Committee) in the 1977 Tennessee Constitutional Convention, in which he advocated reforms to the state judicial system. In 1978, the Tennessee Supreme Court appointed him Attorney General & Reporter, a role he held until 1984. As Attorney General, Leech founded the Environmental Enforcement Division in 1983 and also spearheaded the creation of the Antitrust and Consumer Protection Division.

== Later career and legacy ==
After stepping down as Attorney General in 1984, Leech returned to private practice with the law firm of Waller, Lansden, Dortch and Davis. He was widely respected in legal, business, and governmental circles in Tennessee, both for his public service and for mentorship of younger attorneys. A highway in Maury County was designated in his honor after his death. The Tennessee Bar Association named an award in his honor: the William M. Leech, Jr. Public Service Award.

== Personal life and death ==
Leech was married to Donna Leech. His daughter, Anna Leech preceded him in death, and he was survived by his daughters Becca and Katie and his son, Will Leech. At the time of his death, on June 11, 1996, Leech resided in the Santa Fe community in Maury County, Tennessee.
