= Herbert Slatery =

American politician

27th Attorney General of Tennessee
- In office October 1, 2014 – September 1, 2022
- Governor: Bill Haslam; Bill Lee
- Preceded by: Robert Cooper
- Succeeded by: Jonathan Skrmetti

Personal details
- Born: March 8, 1952 (age 73) Knoxville, Tennessee, U.S.
- Party: Republican
- Education: University of Virginia (BA); University of Tennessee (JD)

Herbert H. Slatery III (born March 8, 1952) is an American attorney from the state of Tennessee. A Republican, he served as the Attorney General of Tennessee from 2014 to 2022.

== Early life ==
Herbert Slatery received his bachelor's degree from the University of Virginia and his Juris Doctor from the University of Tennessee College of Law.

== Career ==
Slatery served as Bill Haslam's campaign treasurer when Haslam ran for mayor of Knoxville, and as chief legal counsel during Haslam's governorship. The Supreme Court of Tennessee chose Slatery to succeed Robert E. Cooper Jr. as attorney general on September 15, 2014. He was sworn in on October 1.

In April 2016, Slatery argued that an anti-transgender discrimination bill would cost the state of Tennessee millions in federal funding. However, in May 2016, he said Tennessee would cover the legal costs incurred by lawsuits should specific schools in the state choose not to follow federal non-discrimination policies towards transgender students. He also decided to sue the United States Department of Education over the policy.

In June 2017, Slatery joined with Republican Attorneys General from nine other states, plus Idaho Governor Butch Otter, in threatening the Donald Trump administration that they would litigate if the president did not terminate the Deferred Action for Childhood Arrivals policy that had been put into place by President Barack Obama. On August 31, Slatery reversed his position, withdrew his support of the proposed lawsuit, and urged passage of the DREAM Act.

On February 8, 2019, Slatery issued an opinion that gender identity is covered under Tennessee's hate crime laws.

On December 8, 2020, Texas Attorney General Ken Paxton sued the states of Georgia, Michigan, Wisconsin, and Pennsylvania, where certified results showed Joe Biden the electoral victor over President Donald Trump, in an effort to overturn the results of the 2020 presidential election. Slatery joined the lawsuit (Texas v. Pennsylvania) and an amicus brief filed by the Missouri A.G., seeking to overturn the results of the presidential election by challenging election processes in four states where Trump lost. State Senate Minority Leader Jeff Yarbro criticized Slatery for spending taxpayer money to interfere with the elections in four other states, terming his intervention as, "...embarrassing and marks a low point in the history of the office," of the Tennessee Attorney General. He termed the legal work as "notably shoddy." Slattery and 16 other states' Attorneys General who support Paxton's challenge of the election results alleged numerous instances of unconstitutional actions in the four states' presidential ballot tallies, arguments that had already been rejected in other state and federal courts.

== Personal life ==
Slatery and his wife live in Nashville, Tennessee.

Legal offices
Preceded by Robert Cooper	Attorney General of Tennessee; 2014–2022	Succeeded by Jonathan Skrmetti
