= Robert Cooper (footballer) =

English footballer

Personal information
- Full name: Robert Cooper
- Place of birth: Southend-on-Sea, England
- Position: Inside forward

Senior career*
Years	Team	Apps	(Gls)
1893–1894	Middlesbrough Ironopolis	2	(2)
1894–1895	Grimsby Town	2	(0)
- * Club domestic league appearances and goals

Robert Cooper was an English professional footballer who played as an inside forward. He played in the Football League for Middlesbrough Ironopolis and Grimsby Town.
