= Jonathan Skrmetti =

American lawyer and politician (born 1977)

28th Attorney General of Tennessee
- Incumbent
- Assumed office September 1, 2022
- Governor: Bill Lee
- Preceded by: Herbert Slatery

Personal details
- Born: January 4, 1977 (age 49) New London, Connecticut, U.S.
- Party: Republican
- Children: 4
- Education: George Washington University (BA); Hertford College, Oxford (BA); Harvard University (JD)
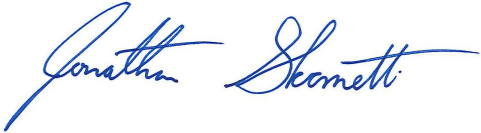
- Signature

Jonathan Thomas Skrmetti (born January 4, 1977) is an American attorney and public official who has served as the 28th attorney general of Tennessee since 2022. Skrmetti worked as a lawyer in Memphis, Tennessee, both in private practice and as a federal prosecutor in the office of the U.S. attorney for the Western District of Tennessee. He later served as Tennessee's chief deputy attorney general and was chief counsel to Governor Bill Lee.

== Background ==
Skrmetti was born in New London, Connecticut, on January 4, 1977. He earned degrees from George Washington University and Hertford College, University of Oxford. He earned a Juris Doctor from Harvard Law School and served as the editor-in-chief of the Harvard Journal of Law & Public Policy.

== Career ==
Skrmetti previously clerked for Judge Steven Colloton on the U.S. Court of Appeals for the Eighth Circuit. As an adjunct professor, he taught cyberlaw at the University of Memphis Cecil C. Humphrey's School of Law. Before entering private practice, Skrmetti was a federal prosecutor for almost a decade, first with the Civil Rights Division of the U.S. Department of Justice, and then as an Assistant U.S. Attorney in Memphis from 2011 to 2014. Skrmetti was also a partner at Butler Snow LLP in Memphis.

He served as chief counsel to Governor Bill Lee from December 2021 to August 2022.

Jonathan Skrmetti served as chief deputy attorney general under Herbert Slatery from December 2018 through December 2021.

== Attorney general of Tennessee ==
Skrmetti was sworn in to serve an eight-year term as attorney general of Tennessee on September 1, 2022.

=== Environmental issues ===
==== State of Tennessee v. 3M et al. ====
On May 31, 2023, Skrmetti filed suit against 21 named and 10 unnamed manufacturers of products using PFAS. The suit focuses on the manufacture and sale of AFFF (aqueous film-forming foam) throughout the state rather than on the various consumer products which contain PFAS. Skrmetti contends that the manufacturers not only knew about the risk PFAS pose to both organisms and the environment, but that they also concealed the level of harm the chemicals could cause in order to raise their profits. The suit further claims that some of the named companies attempted to protect themselves from liability through fraud.

=== Children and social media ===
==== Instagram, Meta, and TikTok ====
Attorney General Herbert Slatery's office had attempted to specifically investigate Instagram in 2021 and TikTok in 2022. Skrmetti, as Chief Deputy Attorney General, argued against the then-planned Instagram for kids only, stating that the platform would be a means of having children become accustomed to social media when they are "psychologically vulnerable."

Skrmetti filed a bipartisan lawsuit against Meta, the parent company of Instagram, in 2024. The lawsuit alleges that Meta knew Instagram was harming children, causing depression and anxiety, hyperactivity, lack of sleep, and other serious mental health harms. The lawsuit, led by Tennessee, included dozens of U.S. states and was filed in coordination with a federal lawsuit filed in California. The seven-week trial opened in July 2026.

==== Roblox ====
On December 18, 2025, Skrmetti sued multiplayer game creation platform Roblox for misleading parents and guardians about child safety, saying that "Roblox is the digital equivalent of a creepy cargo van lingering at the edge of a playground".

=== Social issues ===
==== Opposing changes to Title IX ====
Shortly after being sworn into office, Skrmetti issued a letter to the US Department of Education in opposition to adding "gender identity" to the wording of Title IX.

In January 2023, Skrmetti filed a brief in support of a 2022 injunction against a sports competition under West Virginia's 2021 "Save Women's Sports Act" preventing transgender students from participating in athletics on teams of "the opposite biological sex". The focus of the WV law is on trans women athletes, claiming that their assigned gender at birth provides them an unfair advantage and thus undoes the protections established by Title IX.

==== Friends of George's v. State of Tennessee ====
In March 2023, the LGBTQIA theater company Friends of George's filed lawsuits against the State of Tennessee, Skrmetti, and Shelby County District Attorney Steve Mulroy. The suits argued that the vague language of a new state law restricting public drag performances (defining drag performers as cabaret and likening drag shows to strip clubs) made it impossible to know what activity exactly it intended to curtail, especially in how the state law might be infringing on First Amendment protected speech. When Judge Thomas Parker ruled on June 2, 2023, that the law did violate constitutionally protected speech, he pointed out that it was "substantially overbroad" despite the state's argument that the law would only apply to "expressive content that is harmful to a reasonable 17-year-old".

Skrmetti had been a named defendant in the suit, and joined filings before Judge Parker reached his decision: a motion to dismiss the case due to failure to state a claim and a motion to dismiss due to lack of jurisdiction. Both of these motions were granted as Skrmetti was determined to be acting in his role as attorney general. Skremtti appealed Parker's decision, arguing that the same language Parker found to be vague was present throughout the Tennessee Code.

==== Hannah Miyamoto v. Bill Lee, et al. ====
Retired attorney Hannah Miyamoto (registered with the Hawaii bar) filed suit against Bill Lee, Skrmetti, and Davidson County DA Glenn R. Funk (all named) on March 8, 2023, in the Southern District of California, where she currently resides. She alleges that the TAEA, which Skrmetti has held is still in effect throughout Tennessee except in Shelby County, prevents her from being able to perform her play, Twelve Nights with Viola and Olivia, in Nashville at TPAC. The play is based on Shakespeare's Twelfth Night, or What You Will, in which one of the main characters, Viola, spends the majority of the play impersonating a man. The case is currently pending.

Governor Lee has stated that he is deferring to Skrmetti with respect to whether the TAEA is enforceable outside of Shelby County.

==== United States v. Skrmetti ====
Skrmetti was a named respondent in United States v. Skrmetti, a U.S. Supreme Court case decided on June 18, 2025. The case concerns Tennessee Senate Bill 1 (SB1 / HB1), which bans certain forms of gender-affirming medical treatments (puberty blockers and hormone therapy) for minors when the purpose is gender transition. In his capacity as Tennessee Attorney General, Skrmetti defended the constitutionality of the law. The central legal question was whether the statute violates the Equal Protection Clause of the Fourteenth Amendment, by discriminating based on sex or transgender status. The Supreme Court upheld the law in a 6-3 decision, finding that it does not classify based on sex or transgender status, but instead draws distinctions based on age and medical condition, and therefore only required review under the deferential rational basis standard of equal protection.

=== Consumer protection ===
==== Ticketmaster ====
After ticket sales for Taylor Swift's Eras Tour rose to as much as $28,000 per ticket on Ticketmaster, Skrmetti opened an investigation into possible violations of antitrust laws, saying that the issue consumers experienced in obtaining tickets might be an indication of not enough competition, though Ticketmaster and LiveNation's merger has been approved through 2025 by the US Department of Justice. The incident did result in the DOJ once again probing the companies for breach of antitrust laws. A statement from one of Ticketmaster's shareholders stated that the fiasco was caused by bots, which may have put the company in violation of a 2008 bot-ban law passed in Tennessee.

One area of concern Skrmetti said would be investigated was whether Ticketmaster/LiveNation profited off of the sales of the tickets twice, as well as what consumers were promised regarding ticket availability. Skrmetti clarified that the concern isn't that everyone who wants a ticket be able to purchase one, but that Ticketmaster made specific claims regarding the service they offer and the quality of that service, and because there is little to no competition, Ticketmaster has no incentive to provide what was promised.

Though there had been no official update from the attorney general's office since December 14, 2022, Skrmetti did tell Time magazine in January 2023 that the investigation is still ongoing and that the evidence found so far "is not entirely consistent" with Ticketmaster's statement that their large market share is due to the difference in quality between their system and "the next best primary ticketing system". When opening the investigation, Skrmetti stated, "If it's a consumer protection violation and we can find exactly where the problems are, we can get a court order that makes the company do better."

==== State of Tennessee et al v. AdoreMe.com ====
Thirty-one states and the District of Columbia filed suit against AdoreMe.com in response to consumer complaints, alleging unfair trade practices against the retailer. Specifically at issue was the VIP program, in which customers were automatically charged a monthly fee of $39.95 unless they either made a purchase or logged into their account. The state attorneys general argued that the program was deceptive as it did not properly disclose the terms, and customers were charged the monthly rate without understanding they would be required to take action before the sixth of every month to avoid the fee. Additionally, those who attempted to cancel their memberships found it extremely difficult and were forced to forfeit accrued store credit in order to do so. The retailer also misled consumers regarding discounts with a "countdown" that didn't actually affect purchase eligibility.

The suit settled in June 2023, with the blanket amount of $2.35 million to be paid amongst the thirty-one states and D.C. and refunds to be offered to the affected customers. AdoreMe.com was required to contact all eligible customers as part of the settlement agreement. As with many suits of this type, the retailer admits no wrongdoing as part of the settlement.

== Recognition and awards ==
In October 2010, United States Attorney General Eric Holder awarded Skrmetti the Attorney General's Award for Distinguished Service for his work as a trial lawyer in the U.S. Attorney's office.

In May 2023, Skrmetti accepted an award from the Tennessee Faith & Freedom Coalition, which proclaimed him a "Defender of Freedom" for his work as attorney general. The group is a self-proclaimed conservative, Christian, anti-Marxist organization.

== Personal life ==
Skrmetti is married and has four children, and resides in Franklin, Tennessee. He is a member of a Churches of Christ congregation.

In May 2023, Skrmetti was elected to the board of the Jason Foundation, a 501(c)(3) nonprofit organization that attempts to provide support and educational tools for youth at risk of suicide. He had previously been an ambassador of the foundation.

Skrmetti is a cousin of comedian Ellen Skrmetti by marriage.

Legal offices
Preceded by Herbert Slatery	Attorney General of Tennessee; 2022–present	Incumbent
