= Eugene Brooks McLemore =

American lawyer and politician (1920–2012)

Eugene Brooks McLemore (April 7, 1920 – August 15, 2012) was an American jurist and public official in Tennessee who served as Attorney General & Reporter from 1976 to 1978.

== Early life and education ==
McLemore was born on April 7, 1920, in Medina, Tennessee, and grew up in nearby Jackson, where he attended the city's public schools. He pursued higher education at West Tennessee Business College and Union University before enrolling at Vanderbilt University, where he earned his law degree. Later in his career, he also graduated from the National College of the Judiciary at the University of Nevada, Reno, which reflected his continued commitment to judicial education.

== Military service ==
During World War II, McLemore served in the United States military for more than three and a half years. His service included approximately two and a half years in the Asiatic-Pacific Theater, where he was part of the American effort in one of the war's most active fronts. This experience shaped his later public service and deepened his dedication to civic duty.

== Legal and judicial career ==
Following his return from the war, McLemore practiced law privately for roughly a decade, beginning around 1950. His career then turned toward public service when he was elected to the Tennessee State Senate, where he served three terms and was nominated for a fourth before receiving an appointment as Chancellor of the 14th Chancery Division in 1960. He remained on the chancery bench for more than 15 years, gaining a reputation as a capable jurist and a proponent of judicial reform. After leaving the chancery court, he was appointed Executive Secretary of the Tennessee Supreme Court, a role similar to what is now known as Administrative Director of the Courts.

== Attorney General of Tennessee ==
In 1976, the Tennessee Supreme Court appointed McLemore as Attorney General & Reporter of Tennessee. He held the office until 1978. One notable case during his service was State ex rel. McLemore v. Clarksville School of Theology (1982), in which he sought to enforce state oversight of degree-granting religious institutions, reflecting his focus on upholding educational and consumer standards.

== Personal life and death ==
McLemore was married to Elizabeth Meeks McLemore, and together they raised a family rooted in Jackson and West Tennessee. He died at the age of 92 on August 15, 2012, at Piedmont Henry Hospital in Stockbridge, Georgia.
