= Clare Burson =

American singer-songwriter

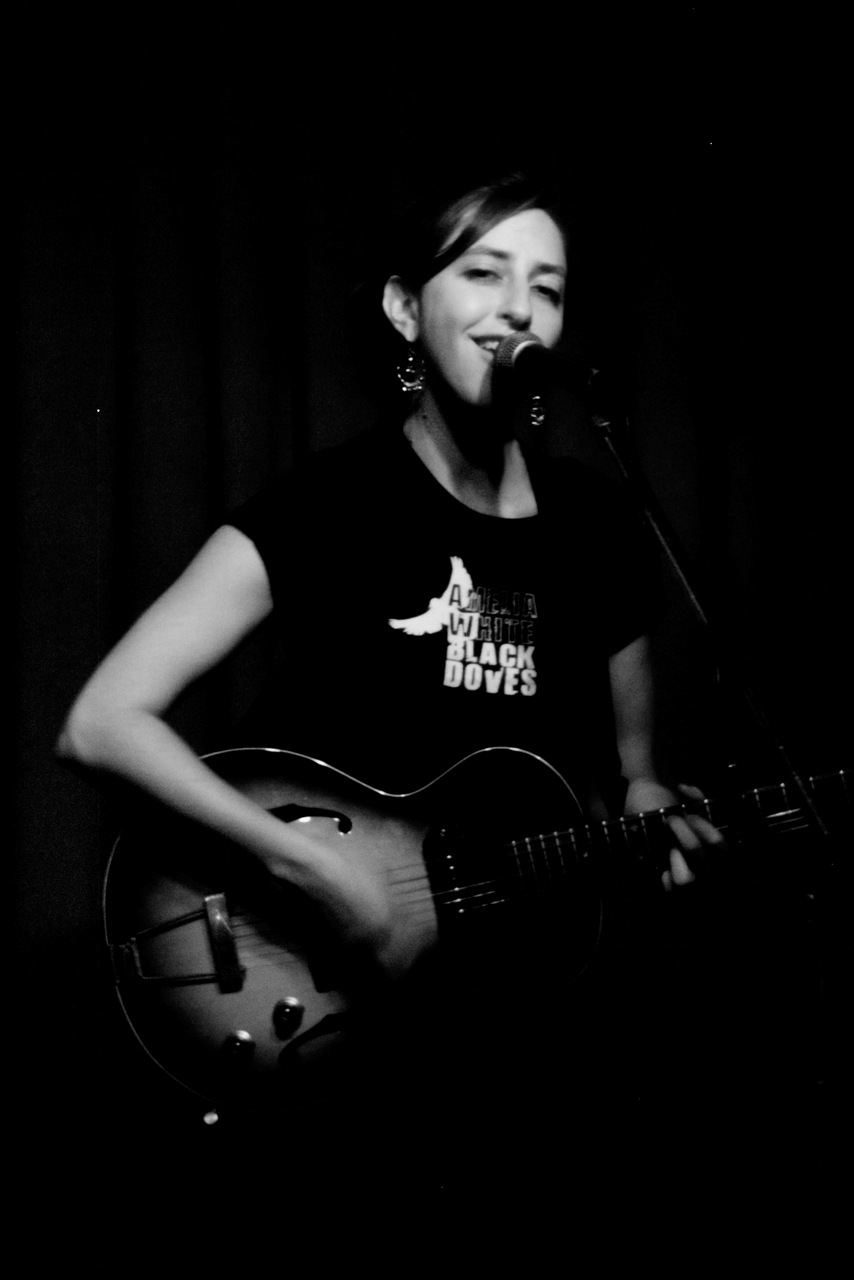
- Clare Burson performing in 2007

Background information
- Born
- Genres: Indie folk
- Instrument: Guitar
- Years active: 2003–present
- Labels: Rounder Records
- Website: www.clareburson.com

Clare Burson is an American indie folk singer-songwriter. She has released four albums. Since 2003, Burson has released four studio albums.

== Early life and education ==
Burson was born in Memphis, Tennessee. She is a classically trained violinist. After graduating from Brown University, she studied Identity Politics and The Holocaust in Germany on a Fulbright Scholarship.

== Music career ==
Burson's 2010 release Silver and Ash was released by Rounder Records, and produced by Tucker Martine. The content of the album is based on Burson's research on her family's life in Nazi Germany. She won a grant from Six Points Fellowship for Emerging Jewish Artist to write an album with Jewish themes.

== Discography ==
Year	Title	Label
2003	The In-Between	
2005	Idaho	
2007	Thieves	Criterion
2010	Silver and Ash	Rounder Records
