= Robert Cowper (composer) =

English composer

Robert Cowper or Robert Cooper (c. 1465–1539/40) was an English composer. He studied music at the University of Cambridge and sang as a lay-clerk there in the Choir of King's College. He was later appointed master of the choristers of the household chapel of Lady Margaret Beaufort.

He composed both sacred and secular music, including masses, motets and madrigals. The Gyffard partbooks contain a four part setting of Hodie composed by Cowper alongside other settings by John Taverner and Thomas Tallis.
