= Harold Wayne Nichols =

Executed American rapist and murderer (1960–2025)

Harold Nichols
- November 2025 mugshot of Nichols
- Born: Harold Wayne Nichols; December 31, 1960; Cleveland, Tennessee, U.S.
- Died: December 11, 2025 (aged 64); Riverbend Maximum Security Institution, Tennessee, U.S.
- Spouse: Joanne (m. 1986)
- Children: 1
- Status: Executed by lethal injection
- Convictions: First degree murder; Aggravated rape (9 counts); Attempted rape; Assault with intent to commit rape; First degree burglary (3 counts)
- Penalty: Death (May 12, 1990)

Details
- Victims: Karen Pulley
- Date: September 30, 1988
- Country: United States
- State: Tennessee
- Weapon: Piece of wooden board
- Date apprehended: January 5, 1989

Harold Wayne Nichols (December 31, 1960 – December 11, 2025) was an American serial rapist and convicted murderer who was executed in Tennessee for the 1988 rape and murder of 20-year-old Karen Pulley of Chattanooga. Nichols was also convicted of a series of rapes in the Chattanooga area between 1988 and 1989.

== Early life ==
Nichols was born on December 31, 1960, in Cleveland, Tennessee, to Mac Nichols and Nanny Lou, an abusive man and a mentally unstable woman. His childhood was marked by poverty, having to share a bedroom with his parents and older sister Deborah, while his paternal grandmother slept in the other room. The Nichols were members of the Church of God of Prophecy, and Mac did not allow any visitors to the house other than fellow churchgoers. In June 1961, Mac's sister Betty Sampley and her husband drowned during a family outing. Two of the six Sampley children were taken in by the Nichols (Royce and Diana, 13 and 12 years old, respectively). For many of the years that followed, Mac exposed himself and threatened Diana with sexual violence, with police later suspecting that he also sexually assaulted the girl.

The overcrowded Nichols home began losing members in August 1966, with the death of Nichols's grandmother. Royce and Diana subsequently became legal adults and moved out between May 1967 and January 1968. Nichols's mother, Nanny, died in January 1971, when Nichols was ten years old. He was left to live with his abusive father and 13-year-old sister. Mac Nichols physically and sexually abused Harold and Deborah for several months, until church leaders forced Nichols to accept a deal where Harold and Deborah would be taken to an orphanage in exchange for the abuse to be covered up and avoid being criminally charged. The Nichols siblings lived at the Tomlinson Children's Home for many years, with Deborah marrying and moving out of state in May 1976. In June 1977, Nichols, then aged 17, was returned to the custody of his father. By then, Mac Nichols was receiving disability benefits, drinking heavily, and soliciting prostitutes. With a teenage Nichols at home, Mac was not abusive, except for a single incident where he propositioned young Harold, who declined his advances.

A student of Kirkman Technical High School, Nichols began skipping classes and roaming the streets, sometimes not returning to his home. He graduated in August 1979 and began his adulthood with difficulties in finding a job, which ultimately led him to enlist in the U.S. Army in November 1981. While stationed at Fort Riley in Kansas, Nichols met a woman (who was married to another soldier) and became engaged in a relationship with her. They moved in together and had a daughter in November 1983. That same month, he was discharged from the Army after showing a generally poor performance, which prompted him to abandon his family and move back to Chattanooga in early 1984. It is not clear where Nichols lived upon his return to Chattanooga, though it is presumed that he returned with his father and began working at a local convenience store.

== Crimes ==
On August 30, 1984, Nichols broke into an apartment shared by two women, alleging that he had the intention to rob. When Nichols encountered one of the women, he attempted to rape her and fled. Police arrested Nichols on September 4, 1984, and he pleaded guilty to assault with intent to commit rape in December of that year. Nichols was sentenced to five years in prison, of which he served 18 months at Brushy Mountain State Penitentiary before being paroled after a psychological evaluation found nothing unusual in him. Still on probation, Nichols was sent back to jail for violating parole terms and was ordered to live with his father until marrying his partner, Joanne. Nichols and his wife married in November 1986, initially living with Nichols's father. She recalled that Mac Nichols was verbally abusive and demanding, causing her and Nichols to move out to another house after Nichols found a job at a local Godfather's Pizza.

Nichols was arrested again in the summer of 1987, after a woman in East Ridge, Tennessee, called the police after seeing a man (Nichols) lurking near her house with a knife. For this arrest and his second parole violation, Nichols served a whole year in county jail, being released in June 1988. He returned to live with his wife and continued working at Godfather's Pizza, getting a promotion to manager in September 1988. Joanne stated that Nichols was a loving and caring man who "treated [her] wonderfully" during their relationship. She said that they did not face any crisis together, other than a child support lawsuit from Nichols's previous partner in Kansas.

Beginning in September 1988 and until his arrest in January 1989, Nichols raped or attempted to rape at least 12 women in the Chattanooga area. On September 30, 1988, his first victim (20-year-old Karen Elise Pulley) was attacked while sleeping. Nichols, who had broken into her house, struck her with a piece of lumber and raped her. He viciously beat Pulley, who was left bleeding on her bedroom floor until one of her friends found her alive but unconscious the next morning. She died later that day. Nichols continued with his crime spree, raping, attempting to rape, and assaulting women in the Chattanooga area. He was arrested on January 5, 1989, following a tip by a man named Chris Mull, who was jealous of Nichols's relationship with his (Mull's) boyfriend, Larry Kilgore, who was best friends with Nichols. He confessed to the murder of Pulley and several rapes the next day, also confessing to his wife. Nichols was indicted on February 1, and he was found competent to stand trial by mental health professionals in July 1989. He expressed remorse for his actions, but added that he would have continued with his violent crimes if not arrested.

== Conviction, appeals, and stayed execution dates ==
Nichols's trial for Pulley's murder began on May 7, 1990, with the court taking jurors from Sumner County for the proceedings. His defense tried to suppress the video confession, but when the court ruled against the request, Nichols pleaded guilty to first degree felony murder, aggravated rape, and first-degree burglary. The judge accepted his guilty pleas and proceeded to the sentencing phase. As the state sought the death penalty against Nichols, defense counsel relied on Nichols's cooperation and good behavior as mitigating factors. Other witnesses for the defense were his own wife, Joanne, his best friend Larry Kilgore, and a local reverend who said that Nichols had been under the influence of an evil spirit. The prosecution brought into court death penalty qualifiers and other aggravating circumstances, including Pulley's way of death and Nichols's confession and convictions on the other five counts of rape.

On May 12, 1990, the jury reached a verdict in less than two hours of deliberation, voting for the death sentence. The judge followed the jury's recommendation and sentenced Nichols to death. He appealed and sought a retrial, but it was denied three times that same year. Four years later, in May 1994, the Tennessee Supreme Court upheld Nichols's death sentence, and the Supreme Court denied a certiorari in January 1995. Also in 1995, the Tennessee Court of Criminal Appeals upheld his non-capital offenses, and another state court rejected a request for retrial in March 1998. In December 2007, Nichols was re-sentenced on the non-capital offenses and given a 25-year minimum term on each count, all of them to run concurrently. On the other five counts, he was sentenced to an aggregate penalty totalling 225 years in prison.

Nichols filed for a habeas corpus at a federal court in Tennessee in May 2003, with a psychiatrist diagnosing him with intermittent explosive disorder (a diagnosis shared by a doctor during Pulley's murder trial) and other mental health issues related to his traumatic childhood. In October 2005, DNA testing proved that Nichols's sperm was present in Pulley's body. His defense subsequently withdrew the claim of innocence on Pulley's murder count. More district court and state appeals were denied in the following years, with Nichols's main cause for defense being ineffective counsel and his cooperation with police by confessing to his crimes. In June 2020, the Supreme Court denied another habeas corpus petition, and an execution date for August of that year was set for Nichols. In July 2020, Governor Bill Lee granted Nichols a stay due to the "challenges and disruptions" caused by the then ongoing COVID-19 pandemic in Tennessee. He was scheduled for execution again on June 9, 2022, but Governor Lee granted him another stay, as the state was pursuing a revision on the lethal injection protocols.

== Third execution date ==
A new protocol for lethal injection was approved in December 2024 and, in March 2025, the Tennessee Supreme Court set an execution date for Nichols on December 11, 2025. He was asked to select his method of execution between electrocution and lethal injection. Upon the expiration of the deadline in November 2025, lethal injection was chosen as his execution method per state law. Nichols's attorneys sued the state for allegedly violating public records acts and asked for the disclosure of the lethal injection protocol, which was granted by a Knox County judge on December 9, 2025. The defense also requested that Governor Lee commute Nichols's sentence to life in prison without parole. Governor Lee subsequently announced that he would not intervene in Nichols's execution and denied him clemency.

Pulley's sister was supportive of Nichols's execution and travelled to Tennessee from Washington to witness the process. She expressed that while her mother visited Nichols in prison years ago, praying with him and giving him a Bible, it was mistakenly taken by Nichols's defense attorneys as a call from Pulley's family to spare his life. Religious leaders in Tennessee called for the commutation of Nichols's death sentence, alleging that Nichols had shown genuine remorse and had also taken full responsibility for his actions.

For his last meal, Nichols asked for beef brisket, coleslaw, a baked potato, onion rings, deviled eggs, and cheese biscuits with fruit tea.

On December 11, 2025, 64-year-old Nichols was put to death by lethal injection at the Riverbend Maximum Security Institution in Nashville. In his final words, he said, "To everyone I've harmed, I'm sorry. To my family, know that I love you. I know where I'm going, I'm ready to go home." Nichols was injected with a lethal dose of pentobarbital and was pronounced dead at 10:39 a.m.

== See also ==
- List of people executed in Tennessee
- List of people executed in the United States in 2025

Executions carried out in Tennessee
| Preceded by Byron Lewis Black August 5, 2025 | Harold Wayne Nichols; December 11, 2025 | Succeeded by Anthony Darrell Dugard Hines August 13, 2026 |
Executions carried out in the United States
| Preceded by Mark Allen Geralds – Florida December 9, 2025 | Harold Wayne Nichols – Tennessee; December 11, 2025 | Succeeded by Frank A. Walls – Florida December 18, 2025 |
