= Tennessee Attorney General =

Attorney general for the U.S. state of Tennessee

Attorney General and Reporter of State of Tennessee
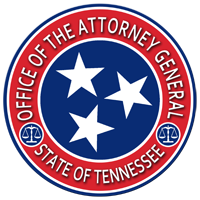
- Incumbent; Jonathan Skrmetti since September 1, 2022
- Office of the Attorney General and Reporter
- Seat: Nashville, Tennessee
- Appointer: Tennessee Supreme Court
- Term length: 8 years
- Constituting instrument: Constitution of Tennessee; Article VI Section 5
- Formation: 1831
- Salary: $196,968 (2021)
- Website: Government Website

The Tennessee attorney general (officially, attorney general and reporter) is the chief law enforcement officer and lawyer for the U.S. state of Tennessee. The office of the attorney general is located at the state capitol in Nashville, Tennessee. The current office holder is Jonathan Skrmetti, who was appointed in 2022 by the Tennessee Supreme Court for an eight-year term. His service officially began when he was sworn in by the current governor of Tennessee, Bill Lee, on September 1, 2022.

== Appointment by judiciary ==
Unlike any other state, the Tennessee attorney general is an officer of the judicial branch, not the executive branch. Article VI Section 5 of the Tennessee Constitution provides for the appointment of the attorney general by the justices of the Supreme Court for a term of 8 years. In most other states, the office of attorney general is appointed by the governor or elected by voters or the legislature.

== Duties ==
- Serves as the chief executive officer of the legal department of state government. Tenn. Code Ann. § 8-6-102; Tenn. Code Ann. §§ 4-3-1502, -1503; Tenn. Code Ann. §§ 4-3-101(25),-111(1).
- Manages the office of the Attorney General and Reporter
- Directs all civil litigated matters and administrative proceedings in which the state of Tennessee or any officer, department, agency, board, commission, or instrumentality of the state may be interested. Tenn. Code Ann. § 8-6-109(b)(1)
- Provides legal representation and/or renders opinions, gives counsel, etc. to the state and political subdivisions of the state.
- Attends to all business of the state, both civil and criminal in the court of appeals, the court of criminal appeals, and the supreme court. Tenn. Code Ann. § 8-6-109(b)(2).

== Office of the Attorney General ==
The attorney general oversees the work and operations of the Office of the Attorney General. In this capacity, he is assisted by various office heads.

=== Chief Deputy Attorney General - Lacey E. Mase ===
- The chief deputy manages the office and coordinates and oversees the office’s legal work.
- Mase was a controversial former staffer for Texas Attorney General Ken Paxton, before being terminated.

=== Solicitor General - Matt Rice ===
- Oversees all litigation on appeals in the Tennessee Supreme Court, Court of Appeals, Court of Criminal Appeals, U.S. Supreme Court, and U.S. 6th Circuit Court of Appeals and oversees all opinions published by the attorney general.
- Previously clerked for Justice Clarence Thomas and judge Sandra Ikuta, and was in private practice at Williams & Connolly LLP.

=== Chief of Staff - Chris Tutor ===
- The chief of staff manages external relations, including communication and legislative strategy, and coordinates with other AG offices across the country.
- Previously a partner at the Memphis office of Butler Snow LLP.

=== Chief Operating Officer - Kelly Smith ===
- The chief operating officer manages administrative matters including talent management, organizational development, IT, fiscal, and facilities management.
- Previously worked for Tennessee governor Bill Haslam, and President George W. Bush.

== List of attorneys general ==
#	Image	Name	Tenure	Party
1		George Shall Yerger	1831–1839	Whig
2		Return J. Meigs III	1839	Democratic
3		West Hughes Humphreys	1839–1851	Democratic
4		William Graham Swan	1851–1854	Democratic
5		John L. T. Sneed	1854–1859	Whig
6		John W. Head	1859–1862	Democratic
–		Horace Maynard	1864	Unconditional Union
7		Thomas H. Coldwell	1865–1870	Republican
8		Joseph Brown Heiskell	1870–1878	Democratic
9		Benjamin J. Lea	1878–1886	Democratic
10		George W. Pickle	1886–1902	Democratic
11		Charles T. Cates Jr.	1902–1913	Democratic
12		Frank M. Thompson	1913–1926	Democratic
13		Charles L. Cornelius	1926	Democratic
14		L. D. Smith	1926–1932	Democratic
15		Roy H. Beeler	1932–1954	Democratic
16		George F. McCanless	1954–1969	Democratic
17		David M. Pack	1969–1974	Democratic
18		Milton P. Rice	1974	Democratic
19		Ray A. Ashley	1974–1976	Democratic
20		Eugene Brooks McLemore	1976–1978	Democratic
21		William M. Leech Jr.	1978–1984	Democratic
22		W. J. Michael Cody	1984–1988	Democratic
23		Charles Burson	1988–1997	Democratic
24		John Knox Walkup	1997–1999	Democratic
25		Paul G. Summers	1999–2006	Democratic
26		Robert E. Cooper Jr.	2006–2014	Democratic
27		Herbert Slatery	2014–2022	Republican
28		Jonathan Skrmetti	2022–present	Republican

== See also ==
- Government of Tennessee
