= Clarence Victor =

American serial killer

- Born: November 1, 1932; Omaha, Nebraska, U.S.
- Died: May 5, 2015 (aged 82); Nebraska State Penitentiary, Lincoln, Nebraska, U.S.
- Convictions: First degree murder Second degree murder Manslaughter; Use of a firearm to commit a felony
- Penalty: Death; commuted to life imprisonment

Details
- Victims: 3
- Span of crimes: 1964–1987
- Country: United States
- State: Nebraska
- Date apprehended: For the final time on December 29, 1987

Clarence Victor (November 1, 1932 – May 5, 2015) was an American serial killer who killed three people in Omaha, Nebraska from 1964 to 1987, with his second and third murders being committed shortly after being paroled. For his last murder, Victor was initially sentenced to death, but it was later reduced to life imprisonment, which he served until his death in 2015.

== Murders ==
=== Hilda Williams ===
On March 20, 1964, Victor got into an argument with 40-year-old Hilda Marian Williams over some money. After she refused to give any money to him, he proceeded to hit and then strangle her to death. Victor then hid the body in a garbage can inside his garage, before eventually dumping it in Adams Park. Her husband reported her as missing that same day, but her fate remained unclear until Victor was arrested about a week later. After being arraigned on murder charges, Victor accepted a plea deal from the prosecutors and was instead convicted of manslaughter, with a sentence of 8 years imprisonment.

=== Jerry Black ===
After serving three years and three months of his sentence, Victor was paroled in 1967 and returned to Omaha. During the next nine years, he got into a relationship with a woman named Iona Chase, found himself a job as a foundry worker and housed several children in his apartment. He is not known to have exhibited troublesome behavior, but rarely interacted with his neighbors.

On April 26, 1976, Victor broke into the house of his neighbor, 24-year-old Jerry Black, a clerk at Northwestern Bell who was talking with a friend of hers on the phone at the time. When she told him to back away, Victor lunged at her with a pocket knife and slit her throat, inflicting a four-inch-deep gash. When he finished, he threw the knife into a nearby yard and asked Chase to help him conceal the crime scene, which she did. Despite their attempts, the pair were arrested on the following day and the children in their apartment were placed in foster care. Victor was held without bond while awaiting trial.

Despite being arraigned on murder charges yet again, Victor pleaded guilty to second-degree murder. Due to this, District Judge Donald Hamilton gave him a 20-year sentence.

=== Alyce Singleton ===
After serving 10 years and five months, Victor was paroled yet again in September 1986. He returned to Omaha, and since he struggled to find work as a twice-convicted murderer, he resorted to doing gardening work for whoever would hire him. One of those clients would be 82-year-old Alyce Singleton, an elderly woman who lived all by herself.

On December 26, 1987, Victor traveled by car to Singleton's house and burgled inside. After coming across her in the kitchen, he beat her into unconsciousness with a metal pipe and broke several of her ribs, before ultimately slashing her throat with a knife. Victor then ransacked the residence and left.

== Arrest and trial ==
Unbeknownst to Victor, some neighbors had taken note of his car on the day of the crime and had informed the authorities about the suspicious driver. Just three days later, he was arrested and charged with felony murder in regard to Singleton's killing. Unlike his previous murders, however, this time he faced the possibility of a mandatory life sentence or even the death penalty. Before he was put on trial, Victor was placed in the Douglas County Hospital, but whether this was to undergo a psychiatric evaluation or treatment for some illness is unclear.

During the proceedings, Victor's attorneys argued that the prosecution's arguments for the first-degree murder case were not substantial, and thus requested that the charges be reduced. Their claims did not convince the jury, who found the defendant to be guilty of first-degree murder. A few months, the three presiding judges sentenced Victor to death, making him the oldest inmate to be sent to the state's death row at the time, at age 56. Victor himself showed no emotion during the sentencing phase, and later refused to comment on the verdict.

== Appeals, commutation, and death ==
In June 1999, Victor's death sentence was commuted to life imprisonment as a result of the passing of a state law the prohibited the execution of people whose IQ was below 70 – and since Victor's IQ had previously been measured at 65, this led to his commutation. According to his defense attorney Mark Weber, Victor was greatly pleased during the hearings and repeatedly thanked him for his efforts.

The following year, Don Stenberg, the contemporary Nebraska Attorney General, unsuccessfully attempted to have his death sentence reinstated, but this motion was denied by the Nebraska Supreme Court. As a result, Victor continued to serve his life term until May 5, 2015, when he died in the nursing facility of the Nebraska State Penitentiary. An official cause of death was not established, but it was believed to be related to a long-term medical condition he suffered from.

== See also ==
- Capital punishment in Nebraska
- List of serial killers in the United States
- Randy Gay
