= Execution of Carey Dean Moore =

2018 execution in Nebraska

Carey Dean Moore
- Born: October 26, 1957; Omaha, Nebraska, U.S.
- Died: August 14, 2018 (aged 60); Nebraska State Penitentiary, Lincoln, Nebraska, U.S.
- Cause of death: Execution by lethal injection
- Conviction: First degree murder (2 counts)
- Penalty: Death (June 20, 1980)

Details
- Victims: Reuel Eugene van Ness; Maynard D. Helgeland (both 47)
- Date: August 22, 1979 (van Ness); August 27, 1979 (Helgeland)

Carey Dean Moore (October 26, 1957 – August 14, 2018) was a convicted murderer, executed by lethal injection by the state of Nebraska. It was the first execution in Nebraska using lethal injection, and the state's first execution since 1997. The execution was the first in the United States to use fentanyl.

The execution took place on August 14, 2018, at the Nebraska State Penitentiary, where Moore had been on death row since his conviction for killing two cab drivers in 1979. Imprisoned for 39 years, Moore was one of the longest-serving death row inmates in the United States.

The execution used a novel drug cocktail of diazepam, fentanyl, cisatracurium, and potassium chloride. The German manufacturer of two of the drugs, Fresenius Kabi, sued the state of Nebraska and sought a restraining order to halt the execution, because EU law prohibits German companies from supplying pharmaceuticals that are used for capital punishment, which is regarded as a grave violation of international human rights law in Germany and other European countries, and because the manufacturer asserted that Nebraska authorities had acquired the drugs by fraud and in violation of the distribution contract which expressly prohibits sale, resale or distribution to American prisons. The lawsuit was part of a wider backlash against American prisons for using drugs obtained from European manufacturers in violation of the laws of their countries of origin.

The execution was the fourth in Nebraska since the 1976 Gregg v. Georgia decision, the first by lethal injection, and the first since a 2015 effort to ban capital punishment in Nebraska. Three other prisoners, Harold Lamont Otey, John Joubert, and Robert E. Williams, were executed in Nebraska's electric chair in the 1990s.

== Background ==
On August 22, 1979, 21-year-old Carey Dean Moore robbed and murdered cab driver Ruel Eugene Van Ness Jr. in Omaha, Nebraska, with a gun he had purchased two days prior. On August 27, he murdered cab driver Maynard D. Helgeland in another robbery. He later confessed to police, and was convicted in 1980 of two counts of first-degree murder. On June 20, 1980, a three-judge panel sentenced Moore to death.

== Pharmaceutical company lawsuit ==
The German pharmaceutical company Fresenius Kabi, the manufacturer of the drugs used in Moore's execution, filed a lawsuit in the United States, seeking a restraining order to stop the use of the drugs in question in the planned execution. Capital punishment has been abolished in all countries of the European Union and the EU requires that all EU companies not supply medicines for lethal injections. The absolute ban on the death penalty is enshrined in both the Charter of Fundamental Rights of the European Union (EU) and the European Convention on Human Rights, and the use of the death penalty is therefore regarded as a grave violation of international human rights law in Europe. Fresenius Kabi only sells the products in question with a legally binding clause that they may not be sold, resold or distributed to prisons or used in execution purposes. Fresenius Kabi asserted that the drugs "could only have been obtained by defendants in contradiction and contravention of the distribution contracts the company has in place and therefore through improper or illegal means" and said the execution would cause reputational damage.

Nebraska denied the charge that it had acquired the drugs by "fraud, deceit or misrepresentation". The United States District Court for the District of Nebraska denied the company's motion for a temporary restraining order, whereby the court relied on the truthfulness of Nebraska Department of Correctional Services director Scott R. Frakes' testimony ("Unless Director Frakes is lying, it would seem that ...", p. 10). The court held that the company's position that delaying Moore's execution would not disrupt the public interest in Nebraska was "laughable" and that the company's position that the illegal use of its product in a killing violating the law of the country the company was based in would cause irreparable corporate reputational harm were without merit, stating that "this lawsuit has generated world-wide coverage of the Plaintiff's desire to avoid any association with the death penalty" and therefore wouldn't be held accountable. The court further declared that the execution would be of major public interest: "In this case, it has everything to do with the functioning of democracy." The United States Court of Appeals for the Eighth Circuit affirmed the district court's decision in its entirety.

In a similar case, also in 2018, the pharmaceutical company Alvogen sought a restraining order to prevent Nevada's execution of Scott Dozier, alleging that the Nevada Department of Corrections had fraudulently acquired its drugs. The Fresenius and Alvogen lawsuits, which took place at the same time, were widely compared by commentators; both lawsuits are part of a trend whereby it has become increasingly difficult for United States authorities to legally buy drugs for the use in executions, due to widespread adoption of distribution contracts by pharmaceutical companies banning distribution to prisons and use in executions. Especially European pharmaceutical companies have pushed back against violations of the distribution contracts in the United States prohibiting straw buying by prisons for capital punishment.

In response to the lawsuit, Nebraska's prisons director Scott Frakes acknowledged that Nebraska would not be able to buy the drugs used in Moore's execution again. Frakes said he had been turned down by 40 pharmacies when trying to buy the drugs, due to the pharmacies' legal obligation not to sell the drugs to prisons.

== Execution ==
=== Death warrant ===
On April 3, 2018, Nebraska attorney general Douglas J. Peterson moved the Nebraska Supreme Court to issue an execution warrant. The Nebraska Supreme Court issued the execution warrant on July 7, 2018, scheduling him to be executed on August 14, 2018.

=== Lethal injection ===
On August 14, 2018, 60-year-old Carey Dean Moore was executed by lethal injection. He was declared dead at 10:47 am. When asked if he had any final words, Moore apologized to his brother for bringing him to commit the murders when he was 14 year old. He also voiced concern on innocent people on death row in a written statement, reportedly stating: ″Why must they remain there one day longer than all the years they have been there. I am guilty. They are not.″

He was the first inmate to be executed in Nebraska since Robert E. Williams on December 2, 1997, and the first person executed by lethal injection in the state; previous executions were done with an electric chair. He has spent over 38 years on death row, resulting in one of the longest continuous stays on death row between sentencing and execution.

== See also ==
- Scott Dozier
- List of most recent executions by jurisdiction
- List of people executed in Nebraska
- List of people executed in the United States in 2018
- Volunteer (capital punishment)

Executions carried out in Nebraska
Preceded by Robert E. Williams December 2, 1997	Carey Dean Moore; August 14, 2018	Succeeded by most recent
Executions carried out in the United States
Preceded by William Ray Irick – Tennessee August 9, 2018	Carey Dean Moore – Nebraska; August 14, 2018	Succeeded by Troy Clark – Texas September 26, 2018
