= Leslie Arnold =

American murderer and fugitive (1942–2010)

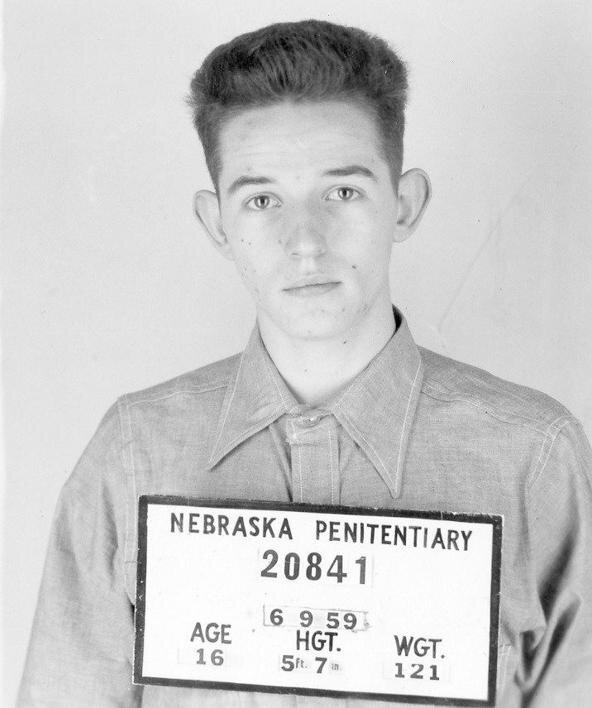
- Arnold's 1959 mugshot
- Born: William Leslie Arnold; August 28, 1942; Omaha, Nebraska, United States
- Died: August 6, 2010 (aged 67); Tamborine Mountain, Queensland, Australia
- Other name: John Vincent Damon
- Conviction: Second-degree murder (2 counts)
- Penalty: Life imprisonment
- Escaped: July 14, 1967; 59 years ago

William Leslie Arnold (August 28, 1942 – August 6, 2010), who later lived under the alias John Vincent Damon, was an American murderer and long-term fugitive.

At age 16, in 1958, Arnold murdered his parents in their Omaha, Nebraska home and buried their bodies in the backyard. He was convicted the following year of two counts of second-degree murder and sentenced to life imprisonment. In 1967, Arnold and another inmate escaped from the Nebraska State Penitentiary, becoming the last prisoners to successfully flee the facility.

Following his escape, Arnold eluded authorities for more than four decades. He lived under assumed identities in California and Florida before immigrating to New Zealand in 1978. He later settled in Tamborine Mountain in Australia, where he lived quietly until his death in 2010.

In 2023, forensic DNA analysis confirmed that John Vincent Damon and William Leslie Arnold were the same person, conclusively solving one of Nebraska’s oldest fugitive cases.

== Early life and crimes ==
William Leslie "Les" Arnold was born on August 28, 1942, in Omaha, Nebraska. His father, Bill Arnold, managed the Omaha regional office of Watkins Products, a door-to-door sales company, while his mother, Opal, was a homemaker.

Neighbors and classmates described Arnold as an intelligent, talented teenager with a short temper. He participated in the ROTC and maintained a B-average in school, though some recalled him as “high-strung” and prone to frustration.

In September 1958, at age sixteen, Arnold fatally shot both of his parents following an argument with his mother over the use of the family car for a date. After the murders, he hid the bodies in the basement overnight, then took his younger brother—unaware of what had happened—to a neighbor’s home. Arnold later dug a trench in the backyard and buried his parents before taking his girlfriend to a movie that same evening using the family car.

For several days, Arnold continued living in the house and attending school, telling friends and neighbors that his parents had taken an unplanned trip.

When police eventually questioned him, Arnold confessed and led investigators to the graves on October 11, 1958. He pleaded guilty the following year to two counts of second-degree murder and received a life sentence.

At the Nebraska State Penitentiary, Arnold was described by prison officials as a “model inmate” who excelled in academic and vocational programs and might have qualified for early release had he not later escaped custody.

== Escape ==
On July 14, 1967, Arnold and another inmate, James Harding, escaped from prison by cutting through the bars in a music room and climbing a 12-foot barbed wire-topped fence.

Harding was recaptured the following year, but Arnold remained missing. He was the last inmate to successfully escape from the Nebraska State Penitentiary. Harding later told investigators that after their escape, the pair traveled to Chicago before parting ways.

The case remained active for decades, investigated by the FBI into the 1990s, then by the Nebraska Department of Correctional Services, before being turned over to the U.S. Marshals Service in 2020.

Arnold eventually relocated to California, then to Florida, and later immigrated to New Zealand in 1978. He died in 2010 in Tamborine Mountain, Australia, due to complications from blood clots, having lived under the alias John Vincent Damon.

During his years in hiding, Arnold married twice and fathered six children. He told his children that he was an orphan.

== Discovery ==
Arnold's son, who had been 19 when his father died, only knew that his father was an orphan and later decided to learn more about him. In 2018, he traveled to Chicago and was informed that his father’s birth certificate had been falsified.

In 2022, he submitted a DNA sample through Ancestry.com, which ultimately led to contact from the U.S. Marshals Service.
