= John Joubert =

John Joubert may refer to:

- John Joubert (composer) (1927–2019), British composer
- John Joubert (serial killer) (1963–1996), American serial killer
