= List of people executed in the United States in 1997 =

Seventy-four people, all male, were executed in the United States in 1997, sixty-eight by lethal injection, and six by electrocution. Maryland carried out its first involuntary execution since the early 1960s. Colorado conducted its last execution that same year before the state officially abolished capital punishment in 2020. Oregon conducted its last execution that same year before the state suspended the use of capital punishment, with then Governor Kate Brown commuting the death sentences of 17 inmates to life without parole and thus emptying the state's death row before the end of her term in 2022.

== List of people executed in the United States in 1997 ==
No.	Date of execution	Name	Age of person			Gender	Ethnicity	State	Method	Ref.
No.	Date of execution	Name	At execution	At offense	Age difference	Gender	Ethnicity	State	Method	Ref.
1	January 8, 1997	Earl Van Denton	47	28	19	Male	White	Arkansas	Lethal injection	
2	January 8, 1997	Paul Ruiz	49	29	20	Male	Hispanic	Arkansas	Lethal injection	
3	January 8, 1997	Kirt Douglas Wainwright	30	22	8	Male	Black	Arkansas	Lethal injection	
4	January 10, 1997	Billy Wayne Waldrop	44	30	14	Male	White	Alabama	Electrocution	
5	January 23, 1997	Randall Greenawalt	47	29	18	Male	White	Arizona	Lethal injection	
6	January 29, 1997	Eric Adam Schneider	35	23	12	Male	White	Missouri	Lethal injection	
7	February 6, 1997	Michael Carl George	39	33	6	Male	White	Virginia	Lethal injection	
8	February 10, 1997	Richard Lewis Brimage Jr.	41	31	10	Male	White	Texas	Lethal injection	
9	February 26, 1997	Coleman Wayne Gray	38	27	11	Male	Black	Virginia	Lethal injection	
10	March 12, 1997	John Kennedy Barefield	32	22	10	Male	Black	Texas	Lethal injection	
11	March 25, 1997	Pedro Luis Medina	39	24	15	Male	Hispanic	Florida	Electrocution	
12	April 2, 1997	David Lee Herman	39	32	7	Male	White	Texas	Lethal injection	
13	April 3, 1997	David Wayne Spence	40	25	15	Male	White	Texas	Lethal injection	
14	April 14, 1997	Billy Joe Woods	50	28	22	Male	White	Texas	Lethal injection	
15	April 16, 1997	Kenneth Edward Gentry	36	22	14	Male	White	Texas	Lethal injection	
16	April 21, 1997	Benjamin Herbert Boyle	53	42	11	Male	White	Texas	Lethal injection	
17	April 24, 1997	John Ashley Brown Jr.	35	23	12	Male	White	Louisiana	Lethal injection	
18	April 29, 1997	Ernest Orville Baldree	55	44	11	Male	White	Texas	Lethal injection	
19	May 2, 1997	Walter Hill	62	41	21	Male	Black	Alabama	Electrocution	
20	May 6, 1997	Terry Washington	33	23	10	Male	Black	Texas	Lethal injection	
21	May 8, 1997	Scott Dawn Carpenter	22	19	3	Male	White	Oklahoma	Lethal injection	
22	May 13, 1997	Anthony Ray Westley	36	23	13	Male	Black	Texas	Lethal injection	
23	May 16, 1997	Harry Charles Moore	56	51	5	Male	White	Oregon	Lethal injection	
24	May 16, 1997	Clifton Eugene Belyeu	38	27	11	Male	White	Texas	Lethal injection	
25	May 19, 1997	Richard Gerry Drinkard	39	28	11	Male	White	Texas	Lethal injection	
26	May 20, 1997	Clarence Allen Lackey	42	22	20	Male	White	Texas	Lethal injection	
27	May 21, 1997	Bruce Edwin Callins	37	20	17	Male	Black	Texas	Lethal injection	
28	May 22, 1997	Larry Wayne White	47	26	21	Male	White	Texas	Lethal injection	
29	May 28, 1997	Robert Anthony Madden	33	22	11	Male	White	Texas	Lethal injection	
30	June 2, 1997	Patrick Fitzgerald Rogers	33	21	12	Male	Black	Texas	Lethal injection	
31	June 3, 1997	Kenneth Bernard Harris	34	23	11	Male	Black	Texas	Lethal injection	
32	June 4, 1997	Dorsie Lee Johnson Jr.	30	19	11	Male	Black	Texas	Lethal injection	
33	June 4, 1997	Davis Losada	32	19	13	Male	Hispanic	Texas	Lethal injection	
34	June 6, 1997	Henry Francis Hays	42	26	16	Male	White	Alabama	Electrocution	
35	June 11, 1997	Earl Russell Behringer	33	22	11	Male	White	Texas	Lethal injection	
36	June 13, 1997	Michael Eugene Elkins	41	35	6	Male	White	South Carolina	Lethal injection	
37	June 16, 1997	David Wayne Stoker	38	27	11	Male	White	Texas	Lethal injection	
38	June 17, 1997	Eddie James Johnson	44	35	9	Male	Black	Texas	Lethal injection	
39	June 18, 1997	Irineo Tristan Montoya	30	18	12	Male	Hispanic	Texas	Lethal injection	
40	June 25, 1997	William Lyle Woratzeck	51	34	17	Male	White	Arizona	Lethal injection	
41	July 1, 1997	Harold I. McQueen Jr.	44	27	17	Male	White	Kentucky	Electrocution	
42	July 2, 1997	Flint Gregory Hunt	38	26	12	Male	Black	Maryland	Lethal injection	
43	July 17, 1997	Roy Bruce Smith	50	41	9	Male	White	Virginia	Lethal injection	
44	July 23, 1997	Joseph Roger O'Dell III	54	41	13	Male	White	Virginia	Lethal injection	
45	July 29, 1997	Robert Wallace West Jr.	35	20	15	Male	Native American	Texas	Lethal injection	
46	August 6, 1997	Ralph Cecil Feltrop	42	32	10	Male	White	Missouri	Lethal injection	
47	August 6, 1997	Eugene Wallace Perry	53	36	17	Male	White	Arkansas	Lethal injection	
48	August 13, 1997	Donald Edward Reese	54	43	11	Male	White	Missouri	Lethal injection	
49	August 19, 1997	Carlton Jerome Pope	35	23	12	Male	Black	Virginia	Lethal injection	
50	August 20, 1997	Andrew Wessel Six	32	21	11	Male	White	Missouri	Lethal injection	
51	September 9, 1997	James Carl Lee Davis	34	21	13	Male	Black	Texas	Lethal injection	
52	September 17, 1997	Mario Benjamin Murphy	25	19	6	Male	Hispanic	Virginia	Lethal injection	
53	September 22, 1997	Jessel Turner	37	25	12	Male	Black	Texas	Lethal injection	
54	September 24, 1997	Samuel Lee McDonald Jr.	48	32	16	Male	Black	Missouri	Lethal injection	
55	September 25, 1997	Benjamin Curt Stone	45	43	2	Male	White	Texas	Lethal injection	
56	September 30, 1997	John William Cockrum	38	27	11	Male	White	Texas	Lethal injection	
57	October 1, 1997	Dwight Dwayne Adanandus	41	31	10	Male	Black	Texas	Lethal injection	
58	October 8, 1997	Ricky Lee Green	36	24	12	Male	White	Texas	Lethal injection	
59	October 13, 1997	Gary Lee Davis	53	41	12	Male	White	Colorado	Lethal injection	
60	October 22, 1997	Alan Jeffrey Bannister	39	24	15	Male	White	Missouri	Lethal injection	
61	October 28, 1997	Kenneth Ray Ransom	34	20	14	Male	Black	Texas	Lethal injection	
62	November 4, 1997	Aua Lauti	43	31	12	Male	Pacific Islander	Texas	Lethal injection	
63	November 6, 1997	Aaron Lee Fuller	30	21	9	Male	White	Texas	Lethal injection	
64	November 7, 1997	Earl Matthews Jr.	32	19	13	Male	Black	South Carolina	Lethal injection	
65	November 13, 1997	Dawud Majid Mu'Min	44	35	9	Male	Black	Virginia	Lethal injection	
66	November 19, 1997	Walter Stewart	41	23	18	Male	Black	Illinois	Lethal injection	
67	November 19, 1997	Durlyn Errol Eddmonds	45	25	20	Male	Black	Illinois	Lethal injection	
68	November 19, 1997	Michael Eugene Sharp	43	28	15	Male	White	Texas	Lethal injection	
69	November 20, 1997	Gary Burris	40	23	17	Male	Black	Indiana	Lethal injection	
70	November 21, 1997	Charlie Livingston	35	21	14	Male	Black	Texas	Lethal injection	
71	December 2, 1997	Robert Edward Williams	61	40	21	Male	Black	Nebraska	Electrocution	
72	December 9, 1997	Michael Lee Lockhart	37	27	10	Male	White	Texas	Lethal injection	
73	December 9, 1997	Michael Charles Satcher	29	21	8	Male	Black	Virginia	Lethal injection	
74	December 11, 1997	Thomas Howard Beavers Jr.	26	18	8	Male	White	Virginia	Lethal injection	
		Average:	40 years	28 years	13 years					

== Demographics ==
Gender
Male	74	100%
Female	0	0%
Ethnicity
White	41	55%
Black	26	35%
Hispanic	5	7%
Native American	1	1%
Pacific Islander	1	1%
State
Texas	37	50%
Virginia	9	12%
Missouri	6	8%
Arkansas	4	5%
Alabama	3	4%
Arizona	2	3%
Illinois	2	3%
South Carolina	2	3%
Colorado	1	1%
Florida	1	1%
Indiana	1	1%
Kentucky	1	1%
Louisiana	1	1%
Maryland	1	1%
Nebraska	1	1%
Oklahoma	1	1%
Oregon	1	1%
Method
Lethal injection	68	92%
Electrocution	6	8%
Month
January	6	8%
February	3	4%
March	2	3%
April	7	9%
May	11	15%
June	11	15%
July	5	7%
August	5	7%
September	6	8%
October	5	7%
November	9	12%
December	4	5%
Age
20–29	4	5%
30–39	36	49%
40–49	22	30%
50–59	10	14%
60–69	2	3%
Total	74	100%

== Executions in recent years ==
Number of executions
1998	68
1997	74
1996	45
Total	187

Preceded by 1996	List of people executed in the United States in 1997	Succeeded by 1998
