= Joyo Theatre =

Historic theater in Lincoln, Nebraska, USA

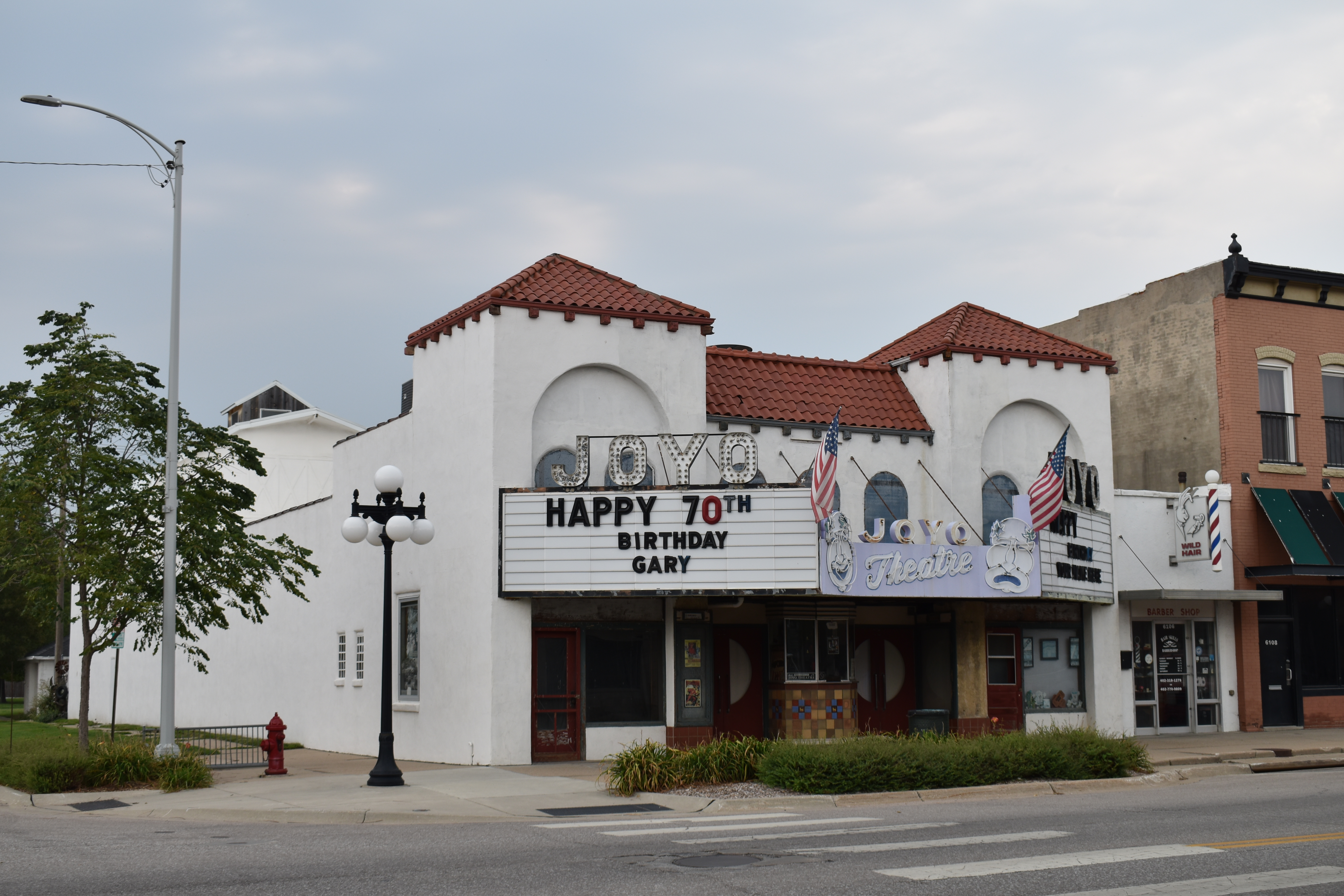
- The Joyo Theatre in 2021
- Interactive map of Joyo Theatre
- Former names: New Lyric Theatre
- Location: 6102 Havelock Ave; Lincoln, Nebraska, USA
- Coordinates: 40°51′26″N 96°38′13″W
- Capacity: 300
- Type: Indoor theater

Construction
- Opened: 1926

The Joyo Theater is a historic theater in Lincoln, Nebraska. It is a single-screen movie theater adapted to also host acts on stage such as musicians and movies with a stage-show component. Constructed in 1926 as the New Lyric Theatre, the marquee and ticket booth date from the 1930s.

== Showings ==
The theater is most well known for a long run of The Rocky Horror Picture Show. The Joyo began screening it as a midnight movie in 1998. At one time the theater showed Rocky Horror every Saturday night; more recently it has screened the movie only near Halloween.

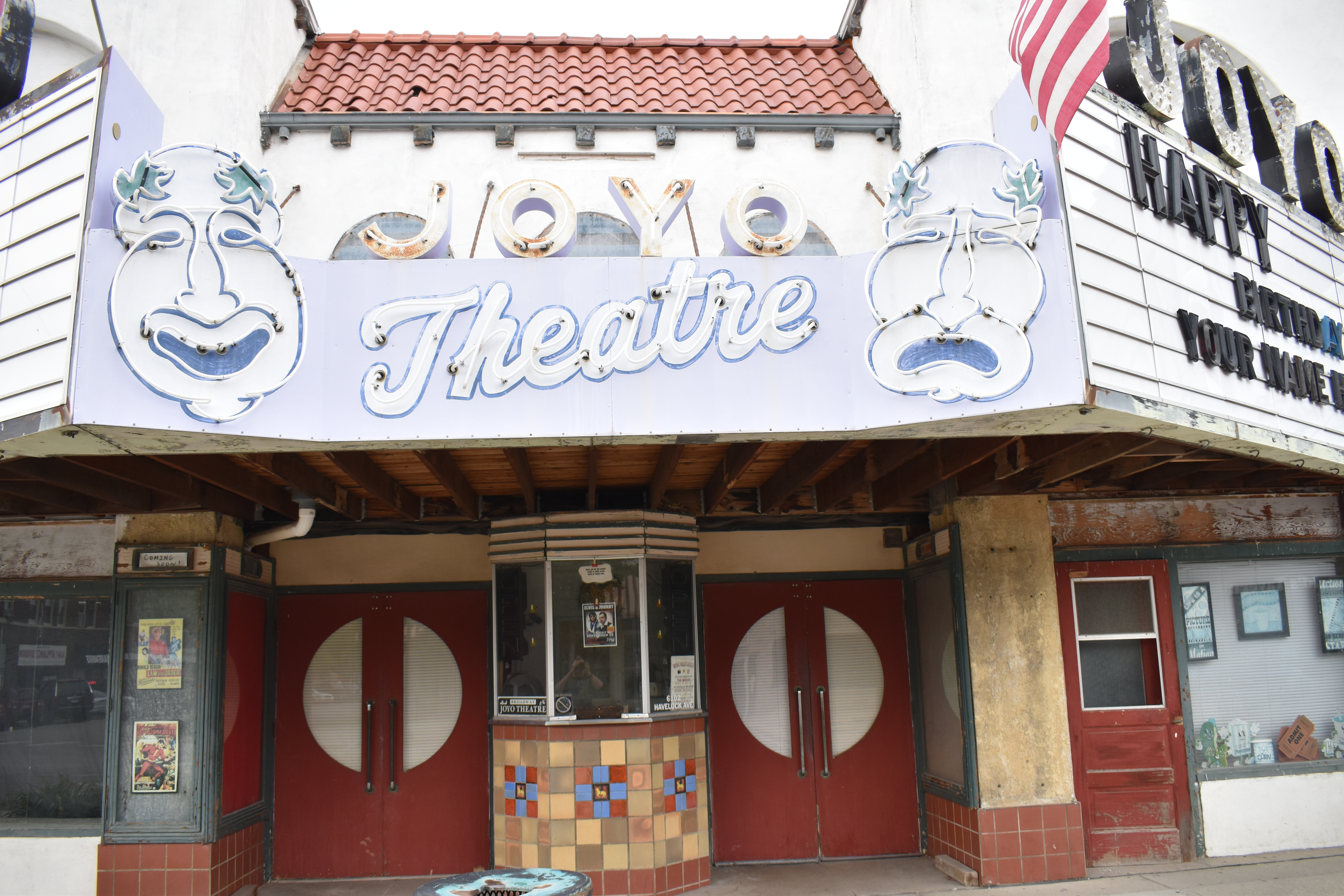
Joyo marquee

The film is combined with a stage show and audience participation in which attendees act out parts of the film, shout extra lines, use squirt guns and throw rice. Audience participation is often so loud that viewers cannot hear the movie. Lines shouted at the Joyo differ noticeably from those heard at showings of Rocky Horror elsewhere.

The Joyo has screened other films with stage components, such as Mortified Nation, a 2013 documentary paired with adults reading on stage from their childhood journals. In 2020 a play about Charles Starkweather performed at the Joyo was livestreamed because of the COVID-19 pandemic.
