= Michael Lee Lockhart =

American serial killer

- Born: September 30, 1960; Walbridge, Ohio, U.S.
- Died: December 9, 1997 (aged 37); Huntsville Unit, Texas, U.S.
- Status: Executed by lethal injection
- Convictions: Texas; Capital murder Indiana; Murder; Florida; First degree murder Wyoming; Robbery
- Penalty: Texas; Death; Indiana; Death; Florida; Death

Details
- Victims: 3–4
- Span of crimes: 1987–1988
- Country: United States
- States: Indiana, Texas, Florida
- Date apprehended: March 22, 1988

Michael Lee Lockhart (September 30, 1960 – December 9, 1997) was an American serial killer who received death sentences in three states (Florida, Indiana, and Texas). He was executed on December 9, 1997, by the state of Texas.

== Arrest and convictions ==
Lockhart was caught in 1988 when Officer Paul Hulsey Jr. tried to arrest him for driving a stolen Chevrolet Corvette in Beaumont, Texas. Officers responding to the motel room where he was reported found Hulsey dead in the room. They put out an all-points bulletin for the vehicle, which was spotted. A high speed chase ensued before Lockhart crashed and was soon apprehended. Evidence of his other crimes were found in the vehicle. Lockhart was convicted of killing Officer Hulsey and was sentenced to death.

Lockhart was later convicted in Indiana for the 1987 murder of 16-year-old Windy Gallagher in Griffith, Indiana. Following the previous conviction, he pleaded guilty to the 1988 murder of 14-year-old Jennifer Colhouer in Land O' Lakes, Florida. He received death sentences in both states. Lockhart was also a suspect in the murder of Kathy Hobbs, a 16-year-old girl abducted from Las Vegas, Nevada in 1987. Her case was featured on Unsolved Mysteries in 1989 and is officially solved. Prior to his cross country murder spree, Lockhart had a previous conviction for robbery in Wyoming.

== Execution ==
Lockhart was executed on December 9, 1997, in Texas. His last meal consisted of a double-patty cheeseburger, French fries, and Coca-Cola. Lockhart's last words were; "a lot of people view what is happening here as evil, but I want you to know that I found love and compassion here. The people who work here, I thank them for the kindness they have shown me and I deeply appreciate all that has been done for me by the people who work here. That's all, Warden. I'm ready."

Nearly one hundred Beaumont police officers turned up to Lockhart's execution and they applauded, clapped, and cheered as witnesses emerged from the prison following the execution.

Lockhart is buried at Captain Joe Byrd Cemetery.

== See also ==
- Capital punishment in Texas
- Capital punishment in the United States
- List of people executed in Texas, 1990–1999
- List of people executed in the United States in 1997
- List of serial killers in the United States

Executions carried out in Texas
Preceded by Charlie Livingston November 21, 1997	Michael Lee Lockhart; December 9, 1997	Succeeded by Karla Faye Tucker February 3, 1998
Executions carried out in the United States
Preceded by Robert E. Williams – Nebraska December 2, 1997	Michael Lee Lockhart – Texas; December 9, 1997	Succeeded by Michael Charles Satcher – Virginia December 9, 1997
