= Outside Valentine =

2004 debut novel of American author Liza Ward

- Author: Liza Ward
- Language: English
- Genre: Novel
- Publisher: Picador
- Publication date: August 12, 2004
- Publication place: United States
- Media type: Print (hardback & paperback)
- Pages: 320 p
- ISBN: 0-8050-7598-4
- OCLC: 54843568
- Dewey Decimal: 813/.6 22
- LC Class: PS3623.A7324 O97 2004

Outside Valentine is the 2004 debut novel of American author Liza Ward, the granddaughter of two of the victims of spree killer Charles Starkweather. The book was first published on August 12, 2004 through Picador and is told from the perspective of Caril Ann Fugate, Starkweather's accomplice, the son of two of his victims, and the son's wife.

Film rights to Outside Valentine were optioned, but plans to create a feature film did not come to fruition.

== Synopsis ==
Lowell, an antique collector operating out of Manhattan, can't seem to forget the bloody path that Charles Starkweather and Caril Ann Fugate left behind them while they went on a killing spree. His wife tries his hardest to soothe him, but can't see to drive the terrors from his dreams. Meanwhile, Caril Ann recollects the first day she met Charles and the events that this meeting would spark.

== Reception ==
Critical reception for Outside Valentine has been positive. The New York Times gave Outside Valentine a mostly positive review and noted that the work's appeal would differ depending on whether the reader was looking for a novel or for a true-crime book. Publishers Weekly posted a starred review for the book, which they called a "riveting literary suspense novel".
