= Robert E. Williams (murderer) =

American spree killer (1936–1997)

- Williams at the Nebraska State Penitentiary in 1995
- Born: Robert Edward Williams; October 14, 1936; East Chicago, Indiana, U.S.
- Died: December 2, 1997 (aged 61); Nebraska State Penitentiary, Lincoln, Nebraska, U.S.
- Cause of death: Execution by electrocution
- Convictions: First degree murder (2 counts); First degree sexual assault
- Penalty: Death (June 30, 1978)

Details
- Victims: 3
- Span of crimes: August 11 – 13, 1977
- Country: United States
- States: Iowa, Minnesota, Nebraska
- Date apprehended: August 18, 1977
- Imprisoned at: Nebraska State Penitentiary

Robert E. Williams (October 14, 1936 – December 2, 1997) was an American spree killer who, in August 1977, killed three women: one in Iowa and two in Nebraska. He also nearly killed a fourth woman in Minnesota after raping her. Williams was sentenced to death in Nebraska and was executed in 1997 at the Nebraska State Penitentiary by electric chair. He was the last person executed in Nebraska via electrocution.

== Early life ==
Williams was born on October 14, 1936, in East Chicago, Indiana. He had five brothers and one sister. Both Williams and his siblings claimed their father was a violent alcoholic who abused his wife and children. When Williams was still young, his mother abandoned the family and he and his siblings were separated by welfare officials. From the age of 14, he lived in a succession of foster homes. He enlisted in the Army and was honorably discharged as a corporal in 1958. In 1971, he arrived in Lincoln, Nebraska. A year later, he met Merrily, a white woman, whom he married. For the remainder of his life, Williams worked in factories and the railroad industry.

== Murder spree ==
On August 3, 1977, Merrily obtained a divorce from Williams. The couple had not lived together for approximately five months and Williams wanted to get back with her. Enraged at the divorce, Williams allegedly kidnapped and sexually assaulted Merrily at knifepoint. On August 10, he was released from jail on bond for the charges. Following his release, Williams went to the home of 25-year-old Patricia McGarry, a single mother with whom he was acquainted. McGarry lived in a northeast Lincoln duplex near UNL's East Campus with another single mother, 25-year-old Catherine Brooks.

On August 11, neighbors grew concerned when they saw Brooks' 5-year-old daughter wandering alone in the neighborhood. They began searching for Brooks and soon alerted the police. Officers entered the apartment Brooks and McGarry shared and discovered their bodies. Both women had been shot three times in the head and upper torso with a .22-caliber handgun. McGarry was dressed in her housecoat while Brooks was naked, with evidence showing she had been sexually assaulted. Police also found McGarry's 3-year-old son hiding under a bed. It was later determined McGarry's son had been in the house with the dead bodies for around eight hours. Both women were killed in the early hours of August 11. Police theorized that Williams killed McGarry first and then shot and raped Brooks when she came to see what was happening as she was worried McGarry was in trouble.

That same day, Williams went to the home of another woman he knew in Lincoln whom he threatened with a gun and held hostage for six hours. During the ordeal, he raped her three times and forced her to perform oral sex on him. The following day, Williams left Nebraska and headed to Sioux Rapids, Iowa. He then broke into a home and raped and murdered 51-year-old Virginia Rowe, the wife of a farmer. Rowe's body was found around noon on the same day by her husband, Wayne, and an Iowa State Patrolman. She was found naked and lying on her bed with a shotgun wound in the chest. On August 13, Williams kidnapped and robbed 55-year-old Walter Behun in Minnesota. Williams left him tied and gagged in a railroad caboose and stole his car. Behun later positively identified Williams as his attacker. Later that day, Williams attacked 20-year-old Katherine Billings in Saint Paul, Minnesota. Billings was kidnapped from a parking lot in Saint Paul before she was raped, shot twice, and thrown from her vehicle. Billings was left bound and bleeding in a remote field but managed to untie herself and get help. She was reported to be in serious condition but survived.

On August 18, after evading authorities for over a week, Williams was arrested in Lincoln. Police apprehended Williams in the early morning hours after he attempted to jump onto a freight train. He did not resist arrest and was found carrying a tire iron. Williams told police he came back to Lincoln to get a change of clothes, while also giving an indication that he had returned to give himself up.

=== Accused murders ===
Williams was initially suspected of being responsible for the murder of Shirleen Howard, who was killed in Winona, Minnesota, on August 13, 1977, while Williams was still on the run. He was questioned in the case, but it soon became apparent he was not involved in her murder, as he had never traveled through Winona. It was later discovered that Shirleen Howard's husband, Donald Howard, had hired a hitman to murder his wife. Both Donald and the hitman were sentenced to life in prison for her murder.

Williams was also questioned in the 1974 murder of Patricia Webb. No link was found between him and her murder; he was questioned solely because he knew Webb. Williams was not charged with Webb's murder, and her case remains unsolved.

== Trial ==
On June 30, 1978, Williams was sentenced to death in the electric chair in Nebraska for the murders of Catherine Brooks and Patricia McGarry. The Nebraska Supreme Court later overturned his conviction for McGarry's murder and ordered him to be resentenced. Ultimately, Williams was never resentenced in McGarry's murder but he retained his death sentence for the rape and murder of Brooks.

== Execution ==
On December 2, 1997, Williams was executed in the electric chair at the Nebraska State Penitentiary for the rape and murder of Catherine Brooks. While being shaved in preparation for his electrocution, Williams was nicked and required first aid, which he found ironic. In his final statement, Williams told reporters, "I'm on my way home." As he was strapped into the electric chair he smiled and reportedly blew kisses to friends who were witnessing the execution. Wayne Rowe, whose wife Virginia had been killed by Williams, attended the execution. He was the first relative of a victim to witness a Nebraska execution. Williams sought out Rowe as he sat in the chair and told him through the glass, "I'm sorry, Mr. Rowe. I love you, brother Rowe." Rowe lifted his hand and waved in acknowledgment, later saying, "The man put us at ease when he came in there." Rowe told reporters that he accepted Williams' apology.

At 10:16 a.m., the first of four jolts of electricity was administered to Williams. He was pronounced dead at 10:23 a.m. Witnesses reported that smoke appeared from the right side of Williams' head and on his left knee area on the first and third jolts of electricity. The execution marked the state of Nebraska's first-ever daytime execution. Williams' death warrant went into effect one minute after midnight on December 2. However, prison officials decided to hold off the execution until later in the day to avoid drunken disturbances from large crowds that had happened at the two previous executions from pro and anti-death penalty supporters. Witnesses to the execution reported that Williams was smiling throughout the entire ordeal and his demeanor was described as calm and almost cheerful, which set everyone in attendance at ease.

Reactions from the friends and relatives of Williams' other victims were mixed. Brooks' brother, Stephen Rada, said he did not want to discuss his family's position on capital punishment or on Williams' impending execution. He said to reporters, "My family is not vindictive. They just don't want the constant reminder." Linda Ode, a friend of McGarry, said only God could know whether the supposed positive change in Williams was genuine. She also said Williams' execution would not make her feel better. She later said, "It's not going to bring Patty back, or Catherine or Mrs. Rowe. But it is something he has to pay for."

Williams was the last person to be executed in Nebraska by electrocution. In 2008, the Nebraska Supreme Court banned the use of the electric chair as "cruel and unusual punishment". The next execution in Nebraska did not occur until over two decades later, when Carey Dean Moore was executed via lethal injection in 2018.

== See also ==
- Capital punishment in Nebraska
- Capital punishment in the United States
- List of people executed in Nebraska
- List of people executed in the United States in 1997
- List of people executed by electrocution

Executions carried out in Nebraska
Preceded by John Joubert July 17, 1996	Robert E. Williams; December 2, 1997	Succeeded by Carey Dean Moore August 14, 2018
Executions carried out in the United States
Preceded by Charlie Livingston – Texas November 21, 1997	Robert E. Williams – Nebraska; December 2, 1997	Succeeded by Michael Lee Lockhart – Texas December 9, 1997
