= NDCS =

NDCS may refer to:

- National Deaf Children's Society
- National Dental Centre Singapore
- Nebraska Department of Correctional Services
