= Randy Gay =

American serial killer

- Born: Randy William Gay; September 1, 1958 (age 68); Garland County, Arkansas, U.S.
- Status: Incarcerated
- Convictions: Capital murder; Second degree murder (2 counts); Terroristic threat
- Penalty: Death

Details
- Victims: 3
- Span of crimes: 1978–2011
- Country: United States
- State: Arkansas
- Weapon: Shotgun
- Imprisoned at: Varner Unit

Randy William Gay (born September 1, 1958) is an American serial killer who killed three people, including his father-in-law and his biological father, with a shotgun during arguments between 1978 and 2011. He served time in prison for each of the first two murders, and was sentenced to death for the third murder.

== Early life ==
After failing to abort him, Randy's mother abandoned him and his sisters when they were young. After their mother left, their father, Glen Harold Gay, became somewhat abusive.

Gloria Lindsey, Randy's older sister, said their father tried his best but had anger issues and was a strict parent who was hard on the family. She said he was often verbally abusive and sometimes physically abusive towards Randy. She also said her brother was sexually abused by some older boys at one point when he was six. Lindsey left home when she was 15 and got married.

Their father remarried but had an unstable relationship with his new wife. Randy would often come to his stepmother's defense against his father. Gloria said she did not blame Randy for killing their father, saying, "of all the things I had experienced and seen. I of all people can understand how it happened."

Gloria said she had been worried about Randy's drinking problem. Although she called her brother a "simple man," she admitted that he never went to rehab for his alcoholism and refused to get help when she spoke to him.

Randy married three times. His first marriage was to a woman named Sherry Buford. The two met when they were teenagers but divorced after the first murder. Randy's second wife was Janice Cochran, who he met when she was working as a nurse. Cochran later testified that Glen often made sexual advances toward her, which made Randy angry. She said the two had a volatile relationship since "they were too much alike" and were both alcoholics who egged each other on. Randy's third marriage, to Debra Anne Powell, also ended in divorce after many violent altercations and cheating scandals. The drinking began to get so bad that money was spent on alcohol instead of bills, causing even more marital issues. (Source: Former Step-Daughter from 3rd Marriage) Afterward, Gloria said his drinking problems worsened, and "he gave up on a lot of things in life."

== First murder ==
On August 12, 1978, Randy killed his father-in-law, 41-year-old James Kelly. According to a witness, Randy retrieved a shotgun from his car and shot Kelly in the chest, killing him. The police said a family dispute led to the shooting. Randy claimed self-defense, saying that Kelly had threatened to kill him. Fearing he would be acquitted, prosecutors arranged a plea agreement for second-degree murder. Randy was sentenced to 10 years in prison with five years suspended but was paroled after just nine months. After several violations of his parole, including for battery and DWI, he was returned to prison. Ultimately, Randy served less than two years in prison for killing Kelly.

When Buford visited Randy to ask him why he killed her father, he told her he didn't know why.

== Second murder ==
On May 4, 1991, Janice Cochran and Randy Gay were camping near the Ouachita River. Glen Gay came to the campsite, and he and his son went fishing. Janice said she suddenly heard them swearing and yelling at each other. Randy returned to the campsite and began loading his shotgun. When Janice asked what was happening, he locked her inside a camping bus they had been staying in. She heard a gunshot, and Randy returned to release her. Janice went to Glen and found him moaning, suffering a single headshot. Randy pulled her away when she tried to help him, and the two loaded the older man into the boat. They rode down the river, and Randy later put Glen's body in his truck and drove off.

Randy returned without his father and refused to talk to his wife about what had happened. Janice said, "he was real hyper and started drinking more." They stayed there for roughly two weeks before returning to Glen's house. When confronted by the police, both denied knowing Glen's whereabouts. However, they eventually turned themselves in. After initially telling investigators that she shot Glen since he was trying to hurt her, Janice confessed the truth to the police. Randy led police to Glen's body, and he and Janice were both arrested for his murder.

Janice and Randy were tried together for Glen's murder. Janice was convicted of manslaughter and served eight months in prison. Randy was convicted of second-degree murder and sentenced to 20 years in prison. He was paroled in 2000.

== Later conviction ==
John Ward, a store owner, said he met Randy in 2006 or 2007. Seeing he was a vagrant, he paid Randy to clean his store and sweep the lot. The two initially had a friendly relationship, but Randy's alcoholism became problematic, and Ward eventually asked him to stop coming to his store. Angered, Randy threatened him over the phone and said he and his friends would kill him. In 2008, he was convicted of making terroristic threats and given a 12-year suspended sentence.

== Third murder and trial ==
On May 10, 2011, Randy got into an argument in his truck with a stranger, 49-year-old Connie Ann Snow, at a logging site. He told her to get out of his truck, but she refused. Randy then went to the back, pulled out his shotgun, and ordered Connie out. As she tried to leave, he shot her in the face, killing her. He then loaded Snow's body into his truck and dumped it in Ouachita National Forest. Randy was arrested the following day.

Randy was charged with capital murder, and prosecutors announced they would seek a death sentence. In 2013, the case resulted in a mistrial due to juror misconduct. Randy was retried in March 2015 and found guilty. During the sentencing phase, prosecutor Terri Harris mentioned Randy's two previous murder convictions in her arguments for a death sentence. Harris said Randy had used the prison system as a "substitute parent" instead of trying to become a better person and told the jury that a life sentence would only be "sending him home." She said James Kelly, Randy's first victim, was "a father, grandfather, and musician who died a violent death at the age of 41."

Randy's lawyer, public defender Mark Fraiser, focused on his upbringing and said he was capable of functioning well in a controlled environment. When he mentioned the abusive nature of Randy's father, Harris rebuffed him, saying he was trying to minimize Glen's murder and the reasoning, or lack thereof, behind it. "Glen Gay got beaten up in court and was not here to defend himself. Are we supposed to turn a blind eye to a second murder?"

In her rebuttal, Harris said that other children had been treated much worse than Randy growing up. Not to discount his father's strictness, but there were no records of him coming to school with physical injuries. She said Randy had "caused the violent deaths of three people for no particular reason," telling the jury that "the time for leniency for this defendant has come to an end, and it needs to end today."

On March 19, 2015, after three hours of deliberation, the jury recommended a death sentence. The judge formally sentenced Randy to death the next day. After sentencing, Randy said, "Take care, judge," and replied, "You, too." Afterwards, Harris admitted she was surprised by the sentencing verdict since no one had been sentenced to death in Garland County since the 1950s. "This one was different, though. I think the deciding factor was that he had killed two other people before."

== See also ==
- Capital punishment in Arkansas
- List of death row inmates in the United States § Arkansas
- List of serial killers in the United States
- Clarence Victor
