= Harold Lamont Otey =

American murderer (1951–1994)

- Born: August 1, 1951; Long Branch, New Jersey, U.S.
- Died: September 2, 1994 (aged 43); Nebraska State Penitentiary, Lincoln, Nebraska, U.S.
- Cause of death: Execution by electrocution
- Conviction: First degree murder
- Penalty: Death (June 20, 1978)

Details
- Victims: Jane McManus, 26
- Date: June 11, 1977
- Country: United States
- State: Nebraska
- Date apprehended: January 26, 1978
- Imprisoned at: Nebraska State Penitentiary

Harold Lamont "Walkin' Wili" Otey (August 1, 1951 – September 2, 1994) was an American criminal convicted of the 1977 rape and murder of Jane McManus, a 26-year-old photography student, in Omaha, Nebraska. Despite recanting his confession and maintaining his innocence for more than 15 years, Otey became the first person to be executed in Nebraska since 1976 when the death penalty was reinstated. He was executed in 1994 by electrocution, becoming the first person to die in Nebraska's electric chair since Charles Starkweather was executed in 1959. Otey's final days were documented by the CBS News program 48 Hours entitled "Death by Midnight".

== Early life ==
Harold Lamont Otey was born on August 1, 1951, in Long Branch, New Jersey. He was born into a large family and had six brothers and six sisters. At the age of 4, Otey left home and went to live with his aunt and uncle in Bryn Mawr, Pennsylvania. He attended school and achieved good grades. In eighth grade, his aunt died and Otey returned to Long Branch to live with his mother. He had a hard time and had difficulty identifying with people who were a similar age to him. In ninth grade, Otey was suspended from school and took a job walking horses at a local racetrack. Otey continued the job for the next eleven years. He worked at major racetracks on the East Coast and in the Midwest.

== Murder ==
In the early morning hours of June 11, 1977, Otey headed to his home in Omaha, Nebraska after a night of partying. As he walked home, he noticed 26-year-old Jane McManus, an Omaha photography student and waitress, sleeping on a sofa on the first floor of the house she shared with her sister. Otey entered the house through the back door, stole a stereo set, and carried it outside, putting it down behind a nearby garage. He then re-entered the apartment and woke McManus. Otey then told her that he was going to rape and rob her. As he attacked McManus, she fought back, causing Otey to cut her across the forehead with a knife. He then raped her before forcing her upstairs to retrieve money, where he stabbed her again. According to Otey, who recounted the crime after his arrest, McManus begged him to kill her. Otey then hit her four or five times over the head with a hammer and strangled her to death with a belt. He then covered her face with a cloth before fleeing.

== Capture, confession, and trial ==
On January 26, 1978, Otey was arrested in Tampa, Florida. On January 28, he was interviewed by two Omaha detectives, where he reportedly gave a voluntary statement which was a full confession to the rape and murder of McManus. He recounted the crime in graphic detail at the time of his arrest. However, Otey later recanted his confession and claimed it had been coerced. He confessed to other crimes including attempted rapes but claimed the interviewing detectives had fed him details of the McManus murder and forced him to answer questions while he was under duress.

On April 13, 1978, Otey was convicted of first degree murder in Douglas County District Court. On June 20, 1978, a three-judge panel sentenced him to death. On December 18, 1979, the Nebraska Supreme Court affirmed the conviction and sentence.

Otey continued to maintain his innocence. In June 1991, during an interview with the Associated Press, Otey said he gave the confession because he did not want to face Southern justice. He claimed an officer had told him that efforts were being made to connect him to an additional thirteen or fourteen murders in Florida.

== Execution ==
On September 2, 1994, Otey was executed in the electric chair at the Nebraska State Penitentiary in Lincoln, Nebraska. He had requested a last meal of spaghetti, the same meal eaten by the other inmates; however, when the time came, he refused it. He declined to make a final statement. He was the first person to be executed in Nebraska since the 1959 execution of Charles Starkweather. Since the death penalty was reinstated in 1976, Otey was the first person to be executed in Nebraska, and the 250th in the United States.

== See also ==
- Capital punishment in Nebraska
- Capital punishment in the United States
- List of people executed in Nebraska
- List of people executed in the United States in 1994

Executions carried out in Nebraska
Preceded by Charles Starkweather June 25, 1959	Harold Lamont Otey; September 2, 1994	Succeeded by John Joubert July 17, 1996
Executions carried out in the United States
Preceded by James William Holmes – Arkansas August 3, 1994	Harold Lamont Otey – Nebraska; September 2, 1994	Succeeded by Jessie Gutierrez – Texas September 16, 1994
