= List of people executed in Nebraska =

The following is a list of people executed by the U.S. state of Nebraska since capital punishment was resumed in the United States in 1976.

== List of people executed in Nebraska since 1976 ==
Four people convicted of murder have been executed by Nebraska since 1976. Three were executed by electrocution. On April 21, 2011, the Nebraska Supreme Court set the first execution date via lethal injection for June 14, 2011. On May 26, 2011, the Nebraska Supreme Court stayed the execution due to objections that the sodium thiopental that Nebraska purchased from a Mumbai company failed to comply with U.S. pharmaceutical standards. The state's first lethal injection was carried out on August 14, 2018.

No.	Name	Race	Age	Sex	Date of execution	County	Method	Victim(s)	Governor
1	Harold Lamont Otey	Black	43	M	September 2, 1994	Douglas	Electrocution	Jane McManus	Ben Nelson
2	John Joseph Joubert	White	33	M	July 17, 1996	Sarpy	Electrocution	Danny Eberle and Christopher Walden (Note: John Joubert was also tried and convicted of murdering Ricky Stetson in Portland, Maine. He received a life sentence in Maine.)	Ben Nelson
3	Robert E. Williams	Black	61	M	December 2, 1997	Lancaster	Electrocution	Catherine Brooks and Patricia McGarry (Note: Robert E. Williams also murdered Virginia Rowe of Sioux Rapids, Iowa.)	Ben Nelson
4	Carey Dean Moore	White	60	M	August 14, 2018	Douglas	Lethal injection	Maynard D. Helgeland and Reuel Eugene Van Ness Jr.	Pete Ricketts

=== Demographics ===
Race
Black	2	50%
White	2	50%
Age
30–39	1	25%
40–49	1	25%
50–59	0	0%
60–69	2	50%
Sex
Male	4	100%
Date of execution
1976–1979	0	0%
1980–1989	0	0%
1990–1999	3	75%
2000–2009	0	0%
2010–2019	1	25%
2020–2029	0	0%
Method
Electrocution	3	75%
Lethal injection	1	25%
Governor (Party)
J. James Exon (D)	0	0%
Charles Thone (R)	0	0%
Bob Kerrey (D)	0	0%
Kay A. Orr (R)	0	0%
Ben Nelson (D)	3	75%
Mike Johanns (R)	0	0%
Dave Heineman (R)	0	0%
Pete Ricketts (R)	1	25%
Jim Pillen (R)	0	0%
Total	4	100%

== See also ==
- Capital punishment in Nebraska
- Capital punishment in the United States
- List of people executed in Nebraska (pre-1972)
