= Billy Waldrop =

American convicted serial killer

- 1997 mugshot of Waldrop
- Born: February 6, 1952; Alabama, U.S.
- Died: January 10, 1997 (aged 44); Holman Correctional Facility, Alabama, U.S.
- Status: Executed by electrocution
- Convictions: 1973; Second-degree murder (x2); 1982; Capital murder Attempted murder
- Penalty: 1973; Second-degree murder: 15 years' imprisonment 1982; Capital murder: Death; Attempted murder: Life without parole

Details
- Victims: 3
- Date: June 26, 1973 (1st time); June 3, 1982 (2nd time); July 1982 (suspected; 3rd time)
- Locations: Calhoun County, Alabama (1973); Talladega County, Alabama (1982); Forest, Mississippi (1982)
- Imprisoned at: Holman Correctional Facility

Billy Wayne Waldrop (February 6, 1952 – January 10, 1997) was an American convicted serial killer who murdered at least three people between 1973 and 1982. Firstly, in Alabama's Calhoun County in 1973, Waldrop committed the murders of two men, J. R. Carter and Clarence Ralph Snider, by torturing and stabbing them, and carved the initials of his name on one of their bodies. Waldrop was convicted of second-degree murder and sentenced to 15 years in prison through a plea agreement with the prosecution. Waldrop served less than seven years out of the jail term before he was released.

However, on June 3, 1982, nine years after he committed his first two murders, Waldrop and two accomplices, William Eugene Singleton and Henry Leslie Mayes, committed robbery and arson, along with the murder of Thurman Macon Donahoo, who was shot and beaten to death at his home in Talladega County, Alabama. While Mays died before trial and Singleton was convicted of lesser charges, Waldrop was found guilty of capital murder on February 18, 1983, and consequently sentenced to death on March 22, 1983. Waldrop was executed by the electric chair on January 10, 1997. While on death row, Waldrop also confessed to committing a Mississippi attempted murder case, in which another person was wrongfully convicted for it, but he did not face charges for that crime.

== Background ==
Billy Wayne Waldrop, who was born in the U.S. state of Alabama on February 6, 1952, had several criminal records ranging from the 1970s to the 1980s, including assault, larceny, escape and attempted murder. He was also a fugitive wanted in 1982 by the authorities of Georgia for the kidnapping of a ten-year-old girl from Atlanta.

In March 1972, a year before he committed his first two murders, Waldrop was found guilty of two counts of auto larceny and sentenced to two years in prison. He escaped on April 29, 1973, while in the midst of a work-release program.

== First murder trial ==
=== Murders of J. R. Carter and Clarence Ralph Snider ===
On June 26, 1973, 21-year-old Billy Waldrop committed the murders of two men in Calhoun County, Alabama.

On that day itself, 58-year-old J. R. Carter and 60-year-old Clarence Ralph Snider, who were both cousins, were attacked and killed by Waldrop inside the residence of Snider in the neighborhood of Blue Mountain. Waldrop had bound and blindfolded both men together before he fatally stabbed them and mutilated the men's bodies; he also carved the initials of his name "B. W. W." on one of the corpses.

=== Charges and plea deal ===
Two days after the double murder, on June 28, 1973, Billy Waldrop was arrested in connection to the case, and subsequently charged with two counts of murder. Additionally, Waldrop was also charged for escaping his work-release program. Reportedly, after his arrest, Waldrop slit his wrists, likely to commit suicide.

Waldrop was indicted by a Calhoun County grand jury in August 1973, and during the same month, he slashed his stomach and arms with a razor in a suicide attempt.

Originally facing a potential death sentence for the double murder, Waldrop ultimately avoided it after his lawyers negotiated a plea deal with prosecutors, under which he agreed to plead guilty to two counts of second degree murder in exchange for a 15-year prison sentence for each count. During a hearing convened on October 3, 1973, Waldrop pleaded guilty and was convicted of second-degree murder for the deaths of Carter and Snider. However, during sentencing, the jury sentenced Waldrop to 20 years in prison for the murder of Snider, five years higher than the amount of time agreed upon by the prosecution. On the other hand, for the other charge of killing Carter in the second degree, Waldrop received a concurrent jail term of 15 years in accordance to the plea agreement.

=== Appeal, re-trial and release ===
Waldrop later filed an appeal to overturn his plea and conviction. On October 3, 1974, the Alabama Court of Criminal Appeals allowed the appeal of Waldrop and overturned his conviction and sentence for Snider's murder, after they accepted that the jury's decision to sentence Waldrop to 20 years rather than the 15 years as previously agreed by the prosecution and defence was a violation of the agreement, and thus ordered a new trial hearing for Waldrop to enter a new plea for the crime.

On November 15, 1975, Waldrop pleaded guilty to second-degree murder a second time for the killing of Snider. As a result of his second plea, he was sentenced to another 15-year jail term, which would run concurrently with the other sentence he gotten for the murder of Carter.

Waldrop was released on January 3, 1981, after serving less than 7 1/2 years out of his sentence.

== Murder of Thurman Donahoo ==
On June 3, 1982, more than a year after he was released from prison, Billy Waldrop, alongside two more accomplices, committed his third murder in Talladega County, Alabama.

On that fateful day, Waldrop and two other accomplices, William Eugene Singleton and Henry Leslie Mayes (also spelt Henry Leslie Mays), conspired to burglarize the house of 72-year-old Thurman Macon Donahoo Sr., and they also planned to kill him if necessary. The motive behind the killing was that the trio believed that Donahoo owned a valuable five-carat diamond ring. Convinced that he was an easy target, they plotted to rob Donahoo.

After they broke into Donahoo's house, the trio attacked the victim, fatally shooting Donahoo in the head and also ransacked his house, stealing the diamond ring and other valuables (including the family silver and Donahoo's guns). Subsequently, in order to conceal the murder and destroy evidence, the trio decided to set fire to Donahoo's 100-year-old house before they fled the scene. When investigators arrived, they found Donahoo's burned and battered body beneath an overturned refrigerator, nearly unrecognizable from the damage.

== Second murder trial ==
The day after the murder, Waldrop and Mayes fled to Tennessee and tried to sell the stolen ring and other items for quick cash. They managed to get around $10,000, though authorities later recovered the ring. In July 1982, Waldrop was arrested in California for a DUI and extradited back to Alabama after he was linked to the murder of Donahoo. While being held in the Talladega County Jail, he gave two statements confessing to his role in the robbery, burglary, and murder.

After his arrest, Waldrop was charged with capital murder on six counts (consisting of four counts of murder during a first-degree robbery and two counts of murder during a first-degree burglary), and his trial began before a Talladega County jury in February 1983.

On February 18, 1983, the jury convicted Waldrop of capital murder as charged. On the same day, the jury unanimously recommended the death penalty for Waldrop.

On March 22, 1983, Waldrop was sentenced to death by Circuit Court Judge William Sullivan, who agreed with the jury that the death penalty was appropriate and the only punishment warranted in the defendant's case.

As for Waldrop's two accomplices, William Eugene Singleton was arrested in 1983 and found guilty of both burglary and conspiracy to commit robbery and murder in 1984, and he was sentenced to life in prison for the conspiracy charges, plus 175 years for burglary. Singleton was paroled in 1994 after serving ten years out of his life sentence. Henry Mayes was arrested in 1987 after being on the run for five years, but he died in prison while awaiting trial.

== Death row and execution ==
=== Attempted murder conviction ===
In January 1983, two months before he was condemned to death row, Billy Waldrop attacked and stabbed a prisoner named Ray Anthony Thompson at the Talladega County Jail. Thompson, who was a trustee that took charge of washing the inmates' clothes, survived his injuries despite sustaining a single neck wound, which was directly above the jugular vein and the carotid artery. In April 1983, a month after he was given the death penalty for murdering Thurman Donahoo, Waldrop was convicted of attempted murder in this stabbing incident and was sentenced to life imprisonment without the possibility of parole. His appeal against the attempted murder conviction was rejected on March 20, 1984.

=== Revelation of another attempted murder ===
During the first year of his detention on death row, Waldrop was linked to an attempted murder in Forest, Mississippi for which another man had been previously convicted. In July 1982, the service station operator at the Billups Service Station on Highway 35 South, Lawrence Anderson, was seriously wounded by a bullet to the face during the commission of an armed robbery. Local police at the time arrested a hitchhiker they found in the vicinity of the crime scene, Charles Henry Thomas, who was charged and wrongfully convicted by a jury as the perpetrator, receiving a sentence of 17 years in a Mississippi State prison for aggravated assault.

However, the case against Thomas began to fall apart in September 1982 after Billy Wayne Waldrop confessed to his involvement in the holdup. Following his confession, authorities from Talladega, Alabama where Waldrop was serving his own sentence set about collaborating with Mississippi law enforcement to re examine the evidence against Thomas. It was found that Thomas's co-defendants in the offense had testified in prior court hearings that Thomas was not involved in the robbery. Additionally, Anderson's ten-year-old son, the eyewitness who originally identified Thomas as the shooter, later clarified that it was Waldrop and not Thomas who shot his father upon being shown the photograph of Waldrop.

Thomas was eventually released from prison after serving approximately 18 months in jail. Despite his confession, Waldrop was never charged for his role in the assault against Anderson.

=== Hunger strikes ===
In 1986, in an attempt to protest he was innocent, Waldrop conducted a three-month hunger strike while in prison, but this led to his hospitalization. A year later, in June 1987, Waldrop conducted a second hunger strike until July 1987; this was carried out shortly after he failed to escape from Holman Correctional Facility, where he was incarcerated on death row.

=== Appeals against death sentence ===
On November 29, 1983, the Alabama Court of Criminal Appeals dismissed Billy Waldrop's direct appeal against his death sentence.

On April 15, 1985, Waldrop's appeal was denied by the U.S. Supreme Court.

On April 28, 1987, the Alabama Court of Criminal Appeals rejected a second appeal from Waldrop.

On June 9, 1994, Waldrop's appeal was dismissed by U.S. District Judge James Hughes Hancock of the U.S. District Court for the Northern District of Alabama.

On February 26, 1996, the 11th Circuit Court of Appeals turned down Waldrop's appeal.

=== Execution ===
After exhausting all avenues of appeal, 44-year-old Billy Waldrop's death sentence was scheduled to be carried out on January 10, 1997.

As the execution drew near, Dottie Jackson, the daughter of Thurman Donahoo, stated that she was hoping to find closure with the execution of her father's killer, although she did hope as well that Waldrop was genuinely repenting for his actions after it became publicized that Waldrop committed himself to Christianity while on death row. Jackson, who planned to attend the execution, was reportedly the first family member of a murder victim in Alabama to become an execution witness, after the state's legislative session passed a law in 1996 to allow the family of murder victims to view the execution of the killer(s). Meanwhile, Waldrop continued to maintain he was innocent and the shooter was his surviving accomplice, William Singleton, who was released at this point in time.

On January 10, 1997, a month short of his 45th birthday, Billy Wayne Waldrop was put to death by the electric chair at the Holman Correctional Facility. Waldrop reportedly sang "Amazing Grace" while he was strapped to the chair. He was pronounced dead at 12:20am, nine minutes after the chair was first activated. For his last meal, Waldrop ordered steak, onions and baked potato, salad and chocolate cake, and also gave his personal possessions to a fellow inmate.

According to reports, Dottie Jackson and her husband attended the execution as witnesses. She commented that her grief was compounded after hearing Waldrop singing one of her favourite hymns before his execution, but she felt relief that a "horrible chapter" of her life (and her family's) had come to an end with Waldrop's execution.

== See also ==
- Capital punishment in Alabama
- List of people executed in Alabama
- List of people executed in the United States in 1997
- List of people executed by electrocution
- List of serial killers in the United States
