= Michael Eugene Sharp =

American serial killer (1954–1997)

- Born: April 24, 1954; Eastland, Texas, U.S.
- Died: November 19, 1997 (aged 43); Huntsville Unit, Huntsville, Texas, U.S.
- Cause of death: Execution by lethal injection
- Other name: Michael Eugene Owensby
- Convictions: Capital murder Murder; Aggravated robbery
- Penalty: Death

Details
- Victims: 3–5+
- Span of crimes: May – June 1982
- Country: United States
- State: Texas
- Date apprehended: June 16, 1982

Michael Eugene Sharp (April 24, 1954 – November 19, 1997) was an American serial killer who abducted and killed two women and one girl in West Texas in 1982, but is thought to be responsible for at least two further murders. Convicted for two of the killings and sentenced to death for one of them, Sharp was executed in 1997.

== Crimes ==
Sharp's first known crime dates back to March 1975, when the then-20-year-old broke into the home of a woman, tied her up and stole all the valuables from the home. The victim survived and her testimony led to his identification and arrest only a few days later, with Sharp subsequently being convicted and sentenced to 15 years imprisonment for two counts of aggravated robbery and theft by check. He was sent to serve this sentence at the Huntsville Unit, but was granted early parole in mid-1979, whereupon he moved to Odessa and found a job as a toolpusher on local oilrigs. He was considered a quiet but respectable man by his neighbors, all of whom noted that he had a beautiful wife, a good job and a big house with three cars.

=== Broadway-Elms murders ===
On June 14, 1982, Sharp was at a car wash in Kermit when he took notice of a car driven by 31-year-old Brenda Broadway, who was accompanied by her daughters, 14-year-old Selena and 8-year-old Christie Elms. He approached their car and threatened them at knifepoint, before forcing them into his pickup truck and driving to a remote area outside the city, where he proceeded to rape the mother and 14-year-old. He also forced the two to perform incestual acts upon each other. During the ordeal, Broadway began praying, which apparently angered Sharp, who said that there could not be a God if he allowed people to suffer like this, before proceeding to stab Broadway and then Christie to death. While this was going on, Selena, who was naked and barefoot, managed to run away. She ran for five miles before reaching an oilfield, where she was found by workers who notified authorities.

Due to the shock she had experienced during the attack, she was questioned when police arrived and revealed the approximate location of where the attack had taken place and what the assailant looked like. Soon after, the bodies of Broadway and Elms were found buried in a desert area outside Kermit, and with a facial composite of the suspect released to the public, tips quickly poured in that identified the suspect as Sharp. Because of this, a warrant was issued for his arrest the day after the murders, but by that time, he had already fled the area. On the next day, police in Sweetwater were notified that a man resembling Sharp was seen on a bus bound for Louisiana, with the authorities going ahead of the bus at one of the stops. There, they successfully apprehended him without incident and charged him with two counts of murder and one count of kidnapping. He was held without bail for the murder charges, and on $200,000 bond for the kidnapping charge.

=== Suspicions ===
Shortly after his arrest, police began investigating any recent cold cases in an attempt to possibly link Sharp to additional crimes. From this, one plausible link was established between him and the murders of 26-year-old William Lawrence McNew and 20-year-old Tammy Lee Davis, who were found buried in shallow graves near Andrews on May 13, after being reported missing in February. Both worked at Rod Ric Inc., the same oil drilling firm that employed Sharp, but aside from this commonality, no solid evidence was unearthed that could link him to the murders. The police also suspected that he might have been involved in the disappearance of 18-year-old Blanca Isela Arreola Guerrero in May, a pregnant food store employee who was last seen boarding a truck similar to Sharp's, but for the time being, they were unable to link him to this crime either.

== Trials and confessions ==
Sharp's initial murder trial was slightly delayed due to his inability to find a lawyer that could represent him, which was further complicated by a law that prevented defendants facing death sentences from pleading guilty to murder charges. When this issue was resolved, he was put on trial first for the murder of Christie Elms, during which her older sister provided testimony on what had occurred. The horrifying nature of the crime and the harrowing description provided by Selena led the jury to unanimously agree on a guilty verdict, but the court accepted a motion by Sharp's attorney, Robert C. Wright, to reduce the murder charges. As a result, his sentence was lessened to a life term, which was criticized by Kermit residents as being too lenient.

While awaiting trial for the murder of Broadway, Sharp reportedly became a born-again Christian. Shortly after, he was contacted by a detective who, on the pretense of adhering to his religious beliefs, asked Sharp to confess if he was responsible for any further murders. Sharp eventually relented and drew a map that led to Guerrero's gravesite and promised to reveal information on other killings as long as his identity was withheld from the media to protect his family. However, an article posted in The Lubbock Avalanche-Journal revealed Sharp's claims, which made him cut all contact with the detective and refuse to give any further information on other crimes. At some point, police from Bossier City, Louisiana tested him for involvement in the 1982 murder of 44-year-old realtor Jean McPhaul, but no such link was established.

At the second trial for the murder of Broadway, Selena was brought in to testify again, retelling what had transpired from when Sharp picked them up until she ran away. After three and a half hours of deliberations, the jurors returned a guilty verdict, which subsequently resulted in a death sentence for Sharp, who professed his innocence in the murders. The sentence was welcomed by the general public and Selena Elms, who herself said that lethal injection was "far too painless." In contrast, Sharp's attorney questioned the veracity of his client's supposed guilt and alleged procedural errors during the trial due to which he and his family had received death threats from anonymous callers.

== Execution ==
After his conviction, Sharp repeatedly appealed his death sentence but was unsuccessful each time. On November 19, 1997, he was executed via lethal injection at the Huntsville Unit. Shortly before the sentence was carried out, he posted a three-page statement which discussed his newfound religion and his opposition to the death penalty.

As of May 2022, no further murders have been definitively linked back to Sharp. While he was not convicted in Guerrero's murder, her case was closed after he led authorities to her grave. He presumably remains a suspect in the killings of McNew and Davis, with authorities believing that he might have killed others across West Texas.

He is buried at Captain Joe Byrd Cemetery.

== See also ==
- Capital punishment in Texas
- List of people executed by lethal injection
- List of people executed in Texas, 1990–1999
- List of people executed in the United States in 1997
- List of serial killers in the United States

== In the media and culture ==
Sharp's crimes were covered on an episode of On the Case with Paula Zahn, titled Lethal Offer. Released on October 7, 2018, it featured interviews with reporter Kim Smith, who had questioned Sharp shortly before his execution in 1997, as well as reporter Tim Madigan, who had extensively covered Sharp's trial.

== Bibliography ==
- Mike Eggleston (January 11, 2012). The true Story of The Sharpest Ever-: Michael Eugene Sharp. Xilbris. ISBN 978-1469136738.
