= Nebraska Diagnostic and Evaluation Center =

U.S. state government site

Coordinates: 40°47′16″N 96°45′59″W

- Interactive map of Nebraska Diagnostic and Evaluation Center
- Location: 3220 W Van Dorn Street Lincoln, Nebraska
- Status: open
- Security class: max
- Capacity: 470
- Opened: 1979
- Managed by: Nebraska Department of Correctional Services

The Nebraska Diagnostic and Evaluation Center (D&E) is a maximum custody, reception, diagnostic, evaluation, assessment, classification and assignment facility for the Nebraska Department of Correctional Services (NDCS). Located in Lincoln, Nebraska, D&E was established by the Nebraska State Legislature in 1976 as part of Legislative Bill 984. Construction was completed in June 1979 and the new institution was opened in August 1979 as a 176-bed facility. It is now known as the Reception and Treatment Center.

== Purpose ==
As provided by State Statute, all adult males sentenced to the NDCS by the County and District Courts of the State of Nebraska are received into the correctional system at the Diagnostic and Evaluation Center. In addition, the institution houses ninety-day evaluators sentenced by the court for assessment, county safe keepers, interstate transfers and returned parolees and escapees.

Initially the facility was set-up to handle one inmate per bed (176 inmates), but overcrowding has forced the prison to add beds to the single person rooms and has brought those numbers consistently over 200-250% capacity resulting in the average population of 470.

In 2022, 384 additional beds were added to house the most dangerous prisoners as well as two 32-bed units for those with mental illnesses.

== Programs ==
Due to the short length of stay at the institution, there are no industry programs and limited education programs. Each newly admitted inmate, following review of the admission order to ensure legal commitment, begins participation in an intensive medical, psychological, and social assessment process. This process culminates in the finalization of an individual classification study and specific programming recommendations to the Classification Officer relative to custody status and institutional placement. Varied program services are offered and encouraged through recreation and library programs. The maintenance of family and community ties is encouraged through the visitation, mail and telephone programs. Religious programming is also available to the inmate population. Several other opportunities including Alcoholics Anonymous, Parenting Classes, and a Pre-Release program are available for inmate participation.

- Security Level: Maximum
- Average Population: Approximately 470
- Number of Staff: 139
- Cost per inmate per year: $30,311

== Notable inmates ==
- Marvin Thomas Nissen — Charged and found guilty of the rape and second-degree murder of Brandon Teena, the inspiration for the film Boys Don't Cry.
