= Vince Champ =

Former American comedian and convicted rapist

- Born: Vinson Horace Champ; September 12, 1961 (age 65); Stockton, California, U.S.
- Occupation: Comedian
- Years active: 1985–1997
- Status: Incarcerated
- Penalty: 30 to 40 years imprisonment

Details
- Victims: 8 (5 raped, 3 attempted)
- Span of crimes: September 6, 1996 – May 6, 1997
- Country: United States
- States: California, Nebraska, Illinois, Iowa, Wisconsin
- Date apprehended: May 7, 1997
- Imprisoned at: Nebraska State Penitentiary

Vinson Horace Champ (born September 12, 1961) is an American former comedian and convicted rapist. Champ was a touring comedian who had gained minor renown for winning first place in the comedy category of the 1992 edition of Star Search. In 1997, he was identified as a serial rapist when his DNA and tour schedule were matched up with a series of rapes on college campuses.

He is currently serving a 30-to-40-year sentence at Nebraska State Penitentiary. His projected release date is in 2033, after which he will begin two consecutive life-term sentences in Iowa.

== Early life ==
Champ was born in Stockton, California, as one of seven children to airman John Champ and Thelma Slade. When Champ was three years old, his older brother Victor died aged ten during an accident at Langley Air Force Base. He graduated Edison High School, where Champ placed fourth in both categories of a nationwide Dramatic and Humorous Interpretation contest hosted by the National Christian Forensics and Communications Association in his senior year. Champ said that he was inspired by his speech coach, SUSD teacher Donovan Cummings. Cummings would later be charged for indecent exposure and solicitation of an undercover sheriff's deputy for a lewd and lascivious act in separate incidents in April and July 1997.

=== Career ===
After graduating Sacramento State College, Champ started his comic career at age 24, working alongside other fledgling comedy figures such as Marc Maron and Jason Stuart. He moved to Los Angeles and was employed by Royal Caribbean and Celebrity Cruises as on-board entertainment. Champ also regularly performed at Punch Line comedy club in Sacramento and Caesars Palace in Las Vegas, and acted in local theatre plays.

Beginning in 1990, Champ made guest appearances in comedy television, including Rosie O'Donnell's Stand-Up Spotlight, the Late Show with David Letterman, An Evening at the Improv, The Byron Allen Show, and a role as a panelist in the 1990 ABC run of Match Game. Champ won $100,000 while competing on Star Search in 1992. After that, Champ mostly performed on the college circuit. He was known as a nice, respectful comedian who only did "clean" material, which made him a favorite for college bookers. A review from The New York Post described Champ as "a breath of fresh air... quick on his feet... a very likeable act. Everyone feels good in the end."

== Crimes ==
According to court documents, Champ's criminal record includes physically attacking his 17-year-old former girlfriend in 1996; Champ was around 35 years old at the time. His only other involvement with the judicial system were hearings between June 1994 and June 1995 as a plaintiff, after Champ filed an automobile tort case at Van Nuys Court House in Los Angeles County.

Champ followed a consistent pattern in his assaults. He wore a ski mask and gloves while he sought out his victims inside college buildings. Each time, he covered the women's heads so they could not identify him, he talked to them during the assault, and he asked each of the women to pray for him afterward. Two of the victims said that Champ specifically asked them if they were virgins and at least one woman described her assailant as Caucasian based on Champ's voice due to his "cultured" accent and "intelligent manner" of speaking.

=== Rapes and attempted rapes linked to Champ ===
- On September 6, 1996, Champ raped a woman at the University of Iowa in Iowa City. He was sentenced to life in prison without parole on November 15, 2002.
- On February 6, 1997, Champ raped a woman at Union College in Lincoln, Nebraska. He was sentenced to up to 40 years in prison in June 2000.
- On February 9, 1997, Champ was suspected of having attempted to rape a woman at Knox College in Galesburg, Illinois. No charges were brought against him.
- On February 10, 1997, authorities believe Champ raped a woman who was practicing piano at Carthage College in Kenosha, Wisconsin. No charges were brought against him.
- On February 16, 1997, Champ raped a woman at St. Ambrose College in Davenport, Iowa. Only five hours earlier that day, an attempted assault took place at Augustana College in neighboring Rock Island, Illinois. Authorities suspected Champ, but no charges were brought against him.
- On March 5, 1997, Champ raped a woman working alone in a computer lab at the University of Nebraska Omaha, for which he received a prison sentence of 25 to 30 years on July 3, 2000. He appealed his conviction to the Nebraska Court of Appeals in 2001; the conviction was upheld.
- On May 6, 1997, Champ attempted to rape a woman at Pasadena City College in Pasadena, California. He fled when the woman screamed, but two witnesses heard the woman's screams and noted the license plate number of the car he fled with.

=== Arrest and investigation ===
On May 6, 1997, Champ was spotted fleeing the scene of an attempted rape at Pasadena City College in Pasadena, California. He was arrested on May 7, 1997, at his apartment in Hollywood, California. The court released him on bail and he left for a trip to the Caribbean. When he returned on May 13, 1997, he was arrested at Newark International Airport in Newark, New Jersey, after detectives in Omaha, Nebraska, connected him to a similar rape at the University of Nebraska Omaha. At the time of his arrest, one of Champ's booking agents commented that Champ's schedule resembled "a road map of where these rapes occurred".

=== Sentencing ===
Immediately after his arrest, Champ was extradited to Nebraska for his trial, which began in February 1998. Champ was charged in three separate cases and pled no contest to first-degree kidnapping, second-degree sexual abuse, and assault under the Code of Iowa. The trial fully concluded in 2002, when he was found guilty of two of the rapes and the attempted rape in Pasadena. Champ has appealed his convictions no less than three times between 2000 and 2003, citing improper admission of evidence, the statistically low but acknowledged probability (1 in 57 billion) that the DNA sample could belong to a different person, insufficient physical evidence and excessive sentencing. No merit was found in the accusations and the convictions were affirmed.

In prison, Champ taught public speaking and communication workshops for the Toastmasters organization, as late as November 2018.

== See also ==
- List of serial rapists
