= Callins v. Collins =

- Court: United States Court of Appeals for the Fifth Circuit
- Full case name: BRUCE EDWIN CALLINS, PETITIONER v. JAMES A. COLLINS, DIRECTOR, TEXAS DEPARTMENT OF CRIMINAL JUSTICE, INSTITUTIONAL DIVISION
- Decided: August 6, 1993
- Citation: 998 F.2d 269 (5th Cir. 1993)

Court membership
- Judges sitting: Patrick Higginbotham, Jerry Edwin Smith and Harold R. DeMoss Jr.

Case opinions
- Majority: Smith

Callins v. Collins, 998 F.2d 269 (5th Cir. 1993), was a Fifth Circuit Court of Appeals case that was denied a writ of certiorari to the United States Supreme Court concerning the death penalty (510 U.S. 1141 (1994)). The case is most well known and cited for Justice Blackmun's dissent about the role of the Supreme Court in death penalty cases.

== Background ==
On June 27, 1980, Bruce Edwin Callins entered a bar in Tarrant County, Texas to commit a robbery. Demanding the bartender to empty the cash register and five other people to empty their pockets and hand him their valuables, Allan Huckleberry, a bar patron, failed to do so quick enough and was fatally shot in the neck. Callins would look through Huckleberry's belongings before fleeing the scene. Callins would be charged with one count of capital murder and six counts of aggravated robbery on August 19, 1980. The state would waive three counts of robbery, and Callins would plead not guilty to the remaining charges. He would be convicted in 1982 for capital offense and two counts of aggravated robbery, landing him a $20,000 fine and being sentenced by a jury to the death penalty.

=== Texas Court of Criminal Appeals ===
The case would be appealed to the Texas Court of Criminal Appeals, where his conviction was reversed due to misjoinder, but a sua sponte motion for rehearing lead to the two aggravated robbery charges being vacated, though keeping capital murder and thus Callins' death sentence. He would initially fail to submit a writ of certiorari with the Supreme Court, seeing his execution date set for May 9, 1990. He would then file with the state trial court a writ of cert and application for writ of habeas corpus, moving his execution date to June 20, but would be denied any relief. He would once again appeal to the Texas Court of Criminal Appeals and be denied, file a stay of execution in federal court, and had the stay granted by the district court on June 12, 1990. He would then petition for a writ of cert to the Supreme Court in 1990, but would be denied. A magistrate judge would then recommend an evidentiary hearing to create an "adequate record", which lead to additional information being added, relief being denied, and the petition being dismissed.

=== Fifth Circuit Court of Appeals ===
Callins would appeal to the Fifth Circuit, citing multiple constitutional violations. He would argue a Sixth Amendment Confrontation Clause violation as he was unable to have the testimony of a witness impeached, which the Court would respond that whether or not it occurred, it would not have had a "substantial and injurious effect or influence in determining the jury's verdict". He would also cite violations to his right to counsel, citing ineffective assistance, to which the Fifth Circuit would state that "Even if counsel's performance in this regard was to be considered deficient, Callins can show no prejudice", as well as the Fifth Amendment Double Jeopardy Clause, which the Fifth Circuit would state "poses no bar to the jury's consideration of Callins's other conduct in determining an appropriate punishment for his aggravated robbery convictions.", and due process violations, which the Court would state "were not infringed by the trifurcated nature of his trial".

The Fifth Circuit would ultimately affirm the judgment of the district court, and Callins would appeal to the Supreme Court.

== Supreme Court ==
The Supreme Court denied certiorari for the case, cited as 510 U.S. 1141 (1994).

=== Concurrence ===
Justice Scalia wrote a concurrence explaining his decision to deny cert. He said that administering the death penalty is within the limits of the Fifth and Eighth Amendments. He discusses that while both he and Justice Blackmun agree with the "incompatibility" of Furman v. Georgia and Lockett v. Ohio jurisprudence, they disagree on the implications of both cases. Scalia would comment that "Convictions in opposition to the death penalty are often passionate and deeply held. That would be no excuse for reading them into a Constitution that does not contain them, even if they represented the convictions of a majority of Americans." He would question why Justice Blackmun would write his dissent on this case rather than more violent murder cases pending before the Court, such as the rape and murder case McCollum v. North Carolina, noting "How enviable a quiet death by lethal injection compared with that!" Scalia would conclude that should people, including the justices, desire capital punishment for "brutal death," then they should not be prevented by "Eighth Amendment jurisprudence."

=== Dissent ===
Justice Blackmun wrote a dissent, discussing that he disagreed with the death penalty as it was currently administered. Following a string of death penalty cases, he would state:

From this day forward, I no longer shall tinker with the machinery of death. For more than 20 years I have endeavored — indeed, I have struggled — along with a majority of this Court, to develop procedural and substantive rules that would lend more than the mere appearance of fairness to the death penalty endeavor. Rather than continue to coddle the Court's delusion that the desired level of fairness has been achieved and the need for regulation eviscerated, I feel morally and intellectually obligated simply to concede that the death penalty experiment has failed. It is virtually self-evident to me now that no combination of procedural rules or substantive regulations ever can save the death penalty from its inherent constitutional deficiencies. The basic question — does the system accurately and consistently determine which defendants "deserve" to die? — cannot be answered in the affirmative. It is not simply that this Court has allowed vague aggravating circumstances to be employed, see, e.g., Arave v. Creech, 507 U.S. 463 (1993), relevant mitigating evidence to be disregarded, see, e.g., Johnson v. Texas, 509 U.S. 350 (1993), and vital judicial review to be blocked, see, e.g., Coleman v. Thompson, 501 U.S. 722 (1991). The problem is that the inevitability of factual, legal, and moral error gives us a system that we know must wrongly kill some defendants, a system that fails to deliver the fair, consistent, and reliable sentences of death required by the Constitution.

Blackmun continued to state that the holding in Furman was correct though the inconsistent administering of the death penalty means that the death penalty should not be allowed, even while the Constitution permits capital punishment. He would also discuss evolving standards of decency by stating that "Just as contemporary society was no longer tolerant of the random or discriminatory infliction of the penalty of death, see Furman, supra, evolving standards of decency required due consideration of the uniqueness of each individual defendant when imposing society's ultimate penalty."

Blackmun also affirmed his decision to join Justice Brennan's McCleskey v. Kemp dissent, and that "we may not be capable of devising procedural or substantive rules to prevent the more subtle and often unconscious forms of racism from creeping into the system does not justify the wholesale abandonment of the Furman promise."

Blackmun continued that the differing challenges with ensuring constitutional all requirements are met are impossible, and that the inability to "harmonize them" means that "the death penalty cannot be administered in accord with our Constitution." He would conclude that there needs to be better procedural rules for capital sentencing by the Court in order to ensure that it is conducted with "consistency, fairness, and reliability," though he is "not optimistic that such a day will come" and quote Justice Marshall's dissent from Godfrey v. Georgia.

== Subsequent developments ==
Callins saw another case argued before the United States District Court for the Northern District of Texas and appealed to the Fifth Circuit. The court would affirm a denial of a petition of a writ of habeas corpus. The case would be appealed to the Supreme Court under Application 96–6391 and would be denied on December 6, 1996.

Callins was executed on May 21, 1997.

== See also ==
- List of people executed in Texas, 1990–1999
- List of people executed in the United States in 1997
