= Walter Hill (serial killer) =

Executed American serial killer

- Hill being escorted into the courtroom in August 1979
- Born: February 7, 1935; Midway, Alabama, U.S.
- Died: May 2, 1997 (aged 62); Holman Correctional Facility, Alabama, U.S.
- Status: Executed by electrocution
- Convictions: Federal; Voluntary manslaughter Kidnapping; Interstate transportation of a stolen vehicle Alabama; Capital murder Second degree murder
- Penalty: Federal; 30 years imprisonment Alabama; Death

Details
- Victims: 5
- Span of crimes: 1952–1977
- Country: United States
- States: Alabama and Georgia

Walter Hill (February 7, 1935 – May 2, 1997) was an American serial killer who killed five people in the Southeast between 1952 and 1977. He was convicted of capital murder, sentenced to death, and executed at Holman Correctional Facility in Alabama in 1997.

== Early life ==
Hill claimed to be a native of Jamaica, but court records indicate that he was born in Midway, Alabama. He was born on February 7, 1935.

== Murders ==
In 1952, Hill, then 17, beat a man to death with a board in Adamsville, Alabama. He pleaded guilty to second degree murder and was sentenced to 10 years in prison. Hill was sent to Atmore State Prison Farm. Shortly before he was transferred, Hill escaped from jail, but was quickly recaptured.

In 1954, Hill was one of 20 inmates who escaped from Atmore Prison Farm during a prison baseball game. The men cut their way through a fence directly under Henry Sawyers, a tower guard who had fallen asleep. Sawyers admitted that he fell asleep and was immediately fired. Several other guards were suspended. Hill and 16 other inmates were caught within a day. Three other inmates managed to avoid capture in the initial search and it is not known whether they were ever found. They were William Payne, serving a three-year sentence for grand larceny, Oscar Underwood, serving a 27-year sentence for grand larceny, false pretense, and assault with intent to murder, and James Garfield Spruce, serving a 31-year sentence for robbery, assault with intent to rob, and burglary.

Hill was released from prison in 1961. He then enlisted in the Jamaican Army, but was dishonorably discharged after nine months. In 1962, Hill and another man kidnapped a man named Arthur Phillips at gunpoint and drove with him across state lines to Alabama. They then forced Phillips out and drove off. Hill was convicted in federal court of interstate transportation of a stolen vehicle and kidnapping and sentenced to 25 years in prison. While serving his sentence at the United States Penitentiary in Atlanta, Hill fatally stabbed a fellow inmate. He was convicted of voluntary manslaughter and had his sentence extended by five years. Hill was paroled in 1975.

On January 7, 1977, Hill was at the home of Willie Mae Hammock, 60, her daughter, 34-year-old Lois Jean Tatum, and Lois's husband, 36-year-old John Tatum Jr. Willie had a 13-year-old stepdaughter named Toni and a 16-year-old adopted son named Robert. Hill asked Willie Hammock if he could marry Toni, whom he had been "dating". Willie Mae refused and went to a closet in the front bedroom. Hill followed her and fatally shot her. He then went to the dining room and shot John twice, then chased Lois through the house and shot her as well. All three victims were shot in the back of the head.

Hill then told Toni, who had witnessed the murders, to get her clothes and leave with him. The two found Robert at the house of one of his friends, and Hill forced him to drive them to Georgia. When they reached Villa Rica, Georgia, the car broke down and Robert managed to escape. He hitchhiked back to Alabama, where he found the bodies.

After Robert's escape, Hill and Toni encountered a man named Lewis Nunnery while walking around in Decatur, Georgia. The two told him about their car, and Nunnery offered to give them a drive to South Carolina. Hill then threatened to kill Nunnery if he attempted to stop them. Nunnery was forced to drive through South Carolina and Tennessee before his car broke down in North Carolina. After noticing that Hill had fallen asleep, Nunnery fled and reported him to the police. Hill was quickly arrested, and the police found the pistol he had used to commit the murders in his pocket. Toni told authorities that she had willingly accompanied Hill.

== Trial ==
Hill originally faced federal kidnapping charges for abducting Nunnery and was suspected of an armed robbery in Georgia. Neither of those cases went to trial after he was indicted for capital murder in Alabama. Toni was not charged, and she, Robert, and Nunnery testified against Hill during his trial. Hill was convicted of capital murder and sentenced to death in October 1977. He won a retrial due to technical errors. In August 1979, Hill was found guilty of capital murder for a second time. During his retrial, he claimed he was not present for the murders and implied that Toni, Robert, or someone else had committed them.

Hill was resentenced to death in September 1979. However, the judge presiding over his case died before he signed the written order formally sentencing him to death. Hill received another sentencing hearing with a new judge. In February 1980, he was sentenced to death for a third time.

== Execution ==
After his appeals failed, Hill was executed in the electric chair at Holman Correctional Facility in 1997. He spent his final hours with his wife, Erma F. Hill, and two of his nieces. Hill's last meal consisted of fried chicken and sweet potatoes. He had no last words, but nodded at one of his nieces, who was a witness. None of the relatives of Hill's victims were present for his execution.

== See also ==
- Capital punishment in Alabama
- List of people executed in Alabama
- List of people executed in the United States in 1997
- List of serial killers in the United States
