= Caril Ann Fugate =

American convicted of 1958 murder spree at age 14

Caril Ann Clair
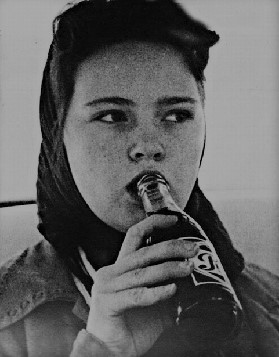
- Caril Fugate, pictured in February 1958
- Born: Caril Ann Fugate; July 30, 1943 (age 83); Lincoln, Nebraska, U.S.
- Spouse: Fredrick Clair (m. 2007; died 2013)
- Status: Released
- Conviction: First degree murder (2 counts)
- Penalty: Life imprisonment (1959); Commuted to 30 to 50 years (1973; paroled after 18 years)

Caril Ann Fugate (born July 30, 1943) is an American spree killer. Fugate was an accomplice of Charles Starkweather, being 14 years old (legally a minor) when his murders took place in 1958. She was convicted as his accomplice and sentenced to life imprisonment. She was paroled in 1976 after serving 18 years.

== Background to crime spree ==
Fugate lived in Lincoln, Nebraska, with her mother and stepfather. She attended Whittier Junior High School in Lincoln and was an intelligent student who was well-liked by her peers. In 1956, at age 13, she formed a relationship with Charles Starkweather, a high school dropout five years her senior. They met through Caril's sister, Barbara, who was dating Starkweather's friend, Bob von Busch.

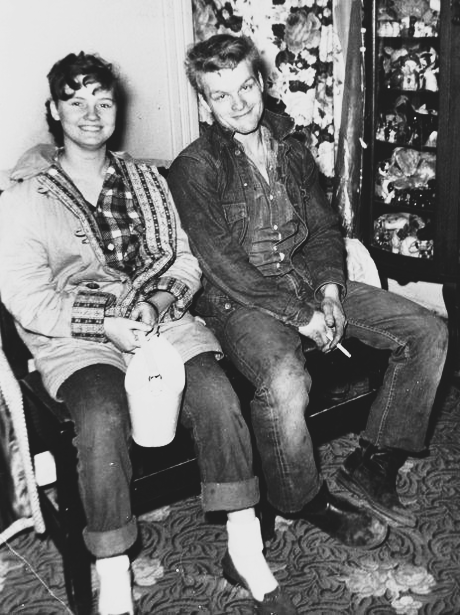
Fugate and Starkweather, c. December 1957

On January 21, 1958, Starkweather shot and killed Fugate's stepfather, Marion Bartlett, and her mother, Velda. Starkweather then clubbed to death Fugate's two-year-old half-sister, Betty Jean. Fugate claimed she came home to find Starkweather there alone, waiting for her with a gun. She claimed he told her that her family was being held hostage and that if she did exactly as he said, her family would be safe. They stayed in the house for the next six days, turning away all visitors, causing relatives to become suspicious. The bodies were found later in outbuildings on the property.

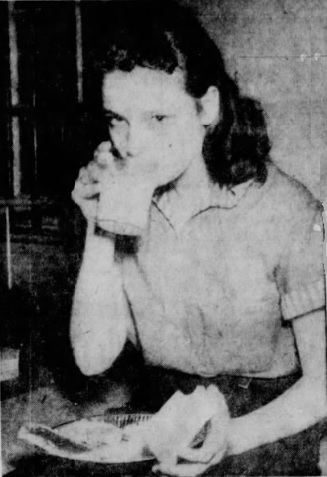
Fugate, pictured while detained in Converse County, Wyoming on the morning of January 30, 1958

== Cross-state crime spree ==
Starkweather and Fugate then fled, driving across Nebraska and ultimately into Wyoming on a murder spree that claimed seven more lives, plus those of two dogs, before they were arrested on January 29. She admitted only to holding a .410 bore shotgun on a young high school couple, Robert Jensen and Carol King. When they were apprehended newspaper clippings were found that detailed her family's murder and the other deaths, contradicting Fugate's claims she thought they were being held hostage (Starkweather also testified that Fugate committed several murders herself).

== Sentencing ==
Starkweather was sentenced to death and executed in the electric chair on June 25, 1959. He insisted that although he had personally killed most of the victims, Fugate had murdered several as well. Although she continued to maintain her innocence, she was tried for her role in the murder spree. Based on the evidence presented that Fugate had opportunities to leave her captivity and Starkweather's own testimony, the jury found her claim that she was Starkweather's hostage not credible. Fugate was convicted of first degree murder in the death of Robert Jensen. Unlike at the trial of Starkweather, the prosecution did not request a death sentence, presumably due to Fugate's young age. After the jury fixed her sentence at life in prison instead of death, she was sent to the Nebraska Correctional Center for Women in York, Nebraska.

In 1973, the Nebraska Board of Pardons commuted Fugate's sentence to 30–50 years, making her eligible for parole. Governor J. James Exon and Secretary of State Allen J. Beermann voted in favor of the commutation, while Attorney General Clarence A. H. Meyer dissented.

== Release from prison ==
Considered to be a model prisoner, Fugate was paroled on June 20, 1976, from York Women's Reformatory in York, Nebraska, after serving 18 years' incarceration. She lived for a time in the Lansing, Michigan area after being paroled. Following her release, Fugate worked as a janitorial assistant and a nanny prior to her retirement.

In 2007, Fugate married Fredrick Clair, a machinist who also worked as a weather observer for the National Weather Service. As of February 2020, she resided in Hillsdale, Michigan.

Fugate was seriously injured on August 5, 2013, in a single-vehicle accident near Tekonsha, Michigan. Her husband, who was driving their sport utility vehicle when it went off the road and overturned, died at the scene.

Fugate, going by her married name of Caril Ann Clair, was denied a pardon by the Nebraska Board of Pardons in February 2020. Relatives of the murder victims supported her pardon application. She maintained her innocence in the 1958 slayings and requested a pardon to "alleviate the burden" of being known as a convicted killer. Her pardon was denied because the role of a pardon is to restore a felon's rights and because her request was too broad for the parole board.

== Legacy ==
=== Film, television and popular music ===
The Starkweather–Fugate case inspired the films The Sadist (1963), Badlands (1973), Kalifornia (1993), Natural Born Killers (1994) and Starkweather (2004). Fugate was portrayed by Fairuza Balk in the made-for-TV biographical film Murder in the Heartland (1993), with Tim Roth starring as Starkweather. Stark Raving Mad (1981), a film starring Russell Fast and Marcie Severson, provides a fictionalized account of the Starkweather–Fugate murder spree.

Fugate appeared on a 1983 episode of Lie Detector hosted by F. Lee Bailey.

The 1996 Peter Jackson film The Frighteners features central plot elements with characters almost identical to Starkweather and Fugate, who commit a murder spree. The fourth episode, "Dangerous Liaisons", of season three from the ID series Deadly Women (aired September 2, 2010) was about the Starkweather–Fugate murders. The first episode, "Teenage Wasteland", of season four from the Investigation Discovery series A Crime to Remember (aired December 6, 2016) portrays the murders and subsequent trial. "The Thirteenth Step", the January 11, 2011, episode of Criminal Minds, depicts newlyweds on a North Dakota-Montana killing spree similar to the Starkweather–Fugate case.

An investigative true-crime documentary miniseries that portrayed Fugate as the titular "12th Victim" of Starkweather was released on Showtime in February 2023.

Starkweather's crime spree was referred to in Bruce Springsteen's song "Nebraska" and Billy Joel's song "We Didn't Start the Fire".

=== Literature ===
The 1974 book Caril is an unauthorized biography of Fugate written by Ninette Beaver, B.K. Ripley (pen name of Alexandra Ripley), and Patrick Trese. Liza Ward, the granddaughter of victims C. Lauer and Clara Ward, wrote the 2004 novel Outside Valentine, based on the events of the Starkweather–Fugate murder-spree. The book Pro Bono: The 18-Year Defense of Caril Ann Fugate by Jeff McArthur follows Fugate's defense team through the trial and appeals process.

In 2011, art photographer Christian Patterson released Redheaded Peckerwood, a collection of photos taken each January from 2005 to 2010 along the 500-mile route traversed by Starkweather and Fugate. The book includes reproductions of documents and photographs of objects that belonged to Starkweather, Fugate, and their victims.
