= Charles Starkweather =

American spree killer (1938–1959)

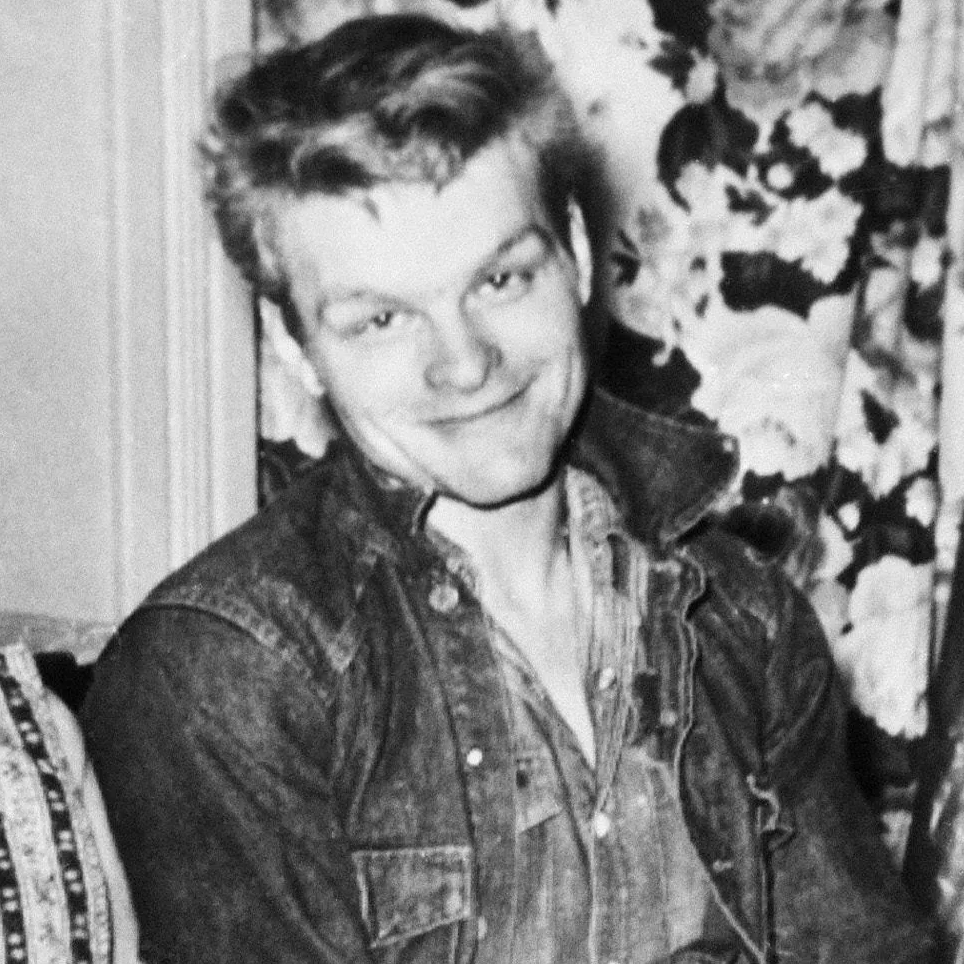
- Starkweather c. 1957
- Born: Charles Raymond Starkweather; November 24, 1938; Lincoln, Nebraska, U.S.
- Died: June 25, 1959 (aged 20); Nebraska State Penitentiary, Nebraska, U.S.
- Resting place: Wyuka Cemetery
- Status: Executed by electrocution
- Conviction: First degree murder
- Penalty: Death

Details
- Span of crimes: December 1, 1957 – January 29, 1958
- Country: United States
- States: Nebraska, Wyoming
- Location: Lincoln and Bennet, Nebraska; Douglas, Wyoming
- Killed: 11
- Weapon: Winchester Model 1906; .410 Stevens Model 59A; .38-caliber revolver; Knife
- Date apprehended: January 29, 1958
- Imprisoned at: Nebraska State Penitentiary

Charles Raymond Starkweather (November 24, 1938 – June 25, 1959) was an American spree killer who committed the fatal shootings of eleven people in Nebraska and Wyoming between the dates of December 1957 and January 1958, when he was nineteen years old. He killed ten of his victims between January 21 and January 29, 1958, the date of his arrest. During his spree in 1958, Starkweather was accompanied by his fourteen-year-old girlfriend, Caril Ann Fugate.

Both Starkweather and Fugate were convicted on charges for their parts in the homicides; Starkweather was sentenced to death and executed seventeen months after the events. Fugate served seventeen years in prison, gaining release in 1976. Starkweather's execution by electric chair in 1959 was the last execution in Nebraska until 1994.

Criminologists and psychologists have analyzed the Starkweather case in an attempt to understand spree killers' motivations and precipitating factors. It also became notorious as one of the earlier crime scandals that reached national prominence, much like the kidnapping of Charles Lindbergh's son, with the media outlets covering the case at the time openly condemning Starkweather. His crime spree has endured in popular culture, most notably as the inspiration for the 1973 film Badlands, the 1996 film The Frighteners, and Bruce Springsteen’s song "Nebraska"; he was also mentioned in the Billy Joel song "We Didn't Start the Fire" and is directly referenced in the Stephen King & Peter Straub novel Other Worlds Than These.

== Early life ==
Starkweather was born in Lincoln, Nebraska, the fourth of seven children of Guy and Helen Arnold Starkweather. The Starkweathers were a working-class family; Starkweather's father was a carpenter who was often unemployed due to rheumatoid arthritis in his hands; Helen worked as a waitress to supplement the family's income. Guy Starkweather admitted at Charles's trial to having pushed his son into a window; later his wife would divorce him on the grounds of extreme cruelty. Starkweather's great-great-grandfather, George Anson Starkweather, was a member of the United States House of Representatives from New York's 21st district from 1847 to 1849.

Starkweather attended Saratoga Elementary School, Irving Junior High School, and Lincoln High School. He later recalled nothing positive of his time at school. Starkweather was born with genu varum, a mild birth defect that caused his legs to be misshapen, and claimed he was teased by classmates because he had a speech impediment. His elementary school teacher did not recall him being teased.

As he grew older and stronger, the only subject in which Starkweather excelled was physical education, where he found an outlet for his rage against those who bullied him. Starkweather then began to bully those who had once picked on him. Eventually, he felt rage against anyone he disliked. Author Ginger Strand argues that his writings from prison suggest a strong element of class envy and bitterness. Starkweather went from being one of the most well-behaved teenagers in the community to one of the most troubled. His high school friend Bob von Busch would later recall:

He could be the kindest person you've ever seen. He'd do anything for you if he liked you. He was a hell of a lot of fun to be around, too. Everything was just one big joke to him. But he had this other side. He could be mean as hell, cruel. If he saw some poor guy on the street who was bigger than he was, better looking, or better dressed, he'd try to take the poor bastard down to his size.

By the time Starkweather dropped out of school, his parents and family were reportedly afraid of him due to his violent outbursts.

== Relationship with Caril Ann Fugate ==
In 1956, at eighteen, Starkweather was introduced to thirteen-year-old Caril Ann Fugate. Starkweather dropped out of high school in his senior year and took a job at a newspaper warehouse because it was near Fugate's school; he began to visit her every day after school. Starkweather taught Fugate how to drive, and one day she crashed the car belonging to Starkweather's father, who banished Starkweather from the family home. Starkweather quit his warehouse job and became a garbage collector.

Starkweather began developing a nihilistic worldview, believing that his current situation was the final determinant of how he would live the rest of his life doing whatever he desired. He began plotting bank robberies, and settled on a personal philosophy: "Dead people are all on the same level".

== First murder ==
Late on November 30, 1957, Starkweather became angry at Robert Colvert, a service station attendant in Lincoln, for refusing to sell him a stuffed animal on credit. He returned several times during the night to purchase small items until finally, brandishing a shotgun, he forced Colvert to give him $100 from the till. He then abducted and drove Colvert to a remote area, where they struggled over the gun, injuring Colvert before Starkweather killed him with several shots to the head.

== 1958 murder spree ==
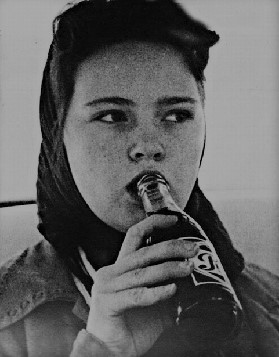
Caril Fugate, pictured en route to Lincoln, Nebraska. February 3, 1958

On January 21, 1958, Starkweather went to Fugate's home. Fugate's mother and stepfather, Velda and Marion Bartlett, told him to stay away. He fatally shot them, then clubbed to death their two-year-old daughter Betty Jean. He hid the bodies in an outhouse and chicken coop behind the house.

Starkweather later said that Caril was there the entire time, but she said that when she arrived home, Starkweather met her with a gun and said that her family was being held hostage. She said Starkweather told her that if she cooperated with him, her family would be safe; otherwise, they would be killed. A note reading "Everybody is sick with the flu" was placed in the family home's window. The pair remained in the house until shortly before the police, alerted by Fugate's suspicious grandmother, arrived on January 27. When the police broke in, they found no one there and the house in apparent order. A few days later, Charles's brother Rodney and his friend Bob Von Busch searched the house and premises, finding the stashed bodies. The police issued an alert to pick up both Starkweather and Fugate.

Starkweather and Fugate drove to the farmhouse of seventy-year-old August Meyer, one of his family's friends who lived in Bennet, Nebraska. Starkweather killed him with a shotgun blast to the head. He also killed Meyer's dog.

Fleeing the area, the pair drove their car into mud and abandoned it. When Robert Jensen and Carol King, two local teenagers, stopped to give them a ride, Starkweather forced them to drive back to an abandoned storm cellar in Bennet. He shot Jensen in the back of the head. He attempted to rape King, but King put up too much resistance for him to do so. He became angry with her and fatally shot her as well. Starkweather later admitted shooting Jensen, but claimed that Fugate shot King. Fugate said she had stayed in the car the entire time. The two fled Bennet in Jensen's car.

Starkweather and Fugate drove to a wealthy section of Lincoln, where they entered the home of industrialist Chester Lauer Ward and his wife Clara. Starkweather stabbed their maid Ludmila "Lilyan" Fencl to death, then waited for Chester and Clara to return home. Starkweather killed the family dog by breaking its neck to keep it from alerting the Wards. Clara arrived first alone and was also stabbed to death. Starkweather later admitted to having thrown a knife at Clara but insisted that Fugate had stabbed her numerous times, killing her. When Chester returned home that evening, Starkweather shot and killed him. While Starkweather and Fugate were in the house, the Wards' newspapers arrived, and they cut out the front-page pictures of themselves and Fugate's dead family. These pictures were found on them later, casting doubt on Caril's claim that she didn't know her family was dead. Starkweather and Fugate filled Ward's black 1956 Packard with stolen jewelry from the house and fled Nebraska.

The murders of the Wards and Fencl caused an uproar within Lancaster County. The flames of public fear were fanned by the era's ongoing panic about "juvenile delinquency." Law enforcement agencies in the region sent their officers on a house-to-house search for the perpetrators. Governor Victor Anderson contacted the Nebraska National Guard, and the Lincoln chief of police called for a block-by-block search of that city. After several sightings of Starkweather and Fugate were reported, the Lincoln Police Department was accused of incompetence for being unable to capture the pair. Vigilante gangs were formed, and local sheriff Merle Karnopp started forming a posse by arming men he found in bars.

Needing a new car because of Ward's Packard having been identified, the couple came upon traveling salesman Merle Collison sleeping in his Buick along the highway outside Douglas, Wyoming. After Collison was awakened, he was fatally shot. Starkweather later accused Fugate of performing a coup-de-grâce after his shotgun jammed. Starkweather claimed Fugate was the "most trigger-happy person" he had ever met. Fugate denied ever having killed anyone.

The salesman's car had a parking brake, which was something new to Starkweather. While he attempted to drive away, the car stalled because the brake had not been released. He tried to restart the engine, and a passing motorist, geologist Joe Sprinkle, stopped to help. Starkweather threatened him with the rifle, and an altercation ensued. At that moment, Natrona County Sheriff's Deputy William Romer arrived on the scene. Fugate ran to him, yelling something to the effect of: "It's Starkweather! He's going to kill me!"

Starkweather drove off and was involved in a car chase with three officers—Romer, Douglas Police Chief Robert Ainslie, and Converse County Sheriff Earl Heflin—exceeding speeds of 100 miles per hour (160 km/h). A bullet fired by Heflin shattered the windshield and flying glass cut Starkweather deep enough to cause bleeding. He stopped, surrendered, and was taken into custody near Douglas on January 29, 1958. Heflin said, "He thought he was bleeding to death. That's why he stopped. That's the kind of yellow son of a bitch he is."

== Trial and execution ==
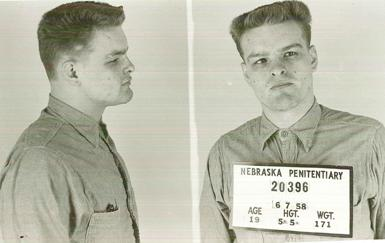
Starkweather's mugshot at Nebraska State Penitentiary, June 7th, 1958.

Starkweather chose to be extradited from Wyoming to Nebraska. He and Fugate arrived there in late January 1958. He believed that either state would have executed him. He was not aware, however, that Milward Simpson, Wyoming's governor at the time, opposed the death penalty. Starkweather first said that he had kidnapped Fugate and that she had nothing to do with the murders. However, he changed his story several times. He testified against her at her trial, saying that she was a willing participant.

Fugate has always maintained that Starkweather was holding her hostage by threatening to kill her family, claiming she was unaware they were already dead. Judge Harry A. Spencer did not believe Fugate was held hostage by Starkweather, as he determined she had had numerous opportunities to escape. When Starkweather was first taken to the Nebraska penitentiary after his trial, he said that he believed that he was supposed to die. He said if he was to be executed, then Fugate should also be executed.

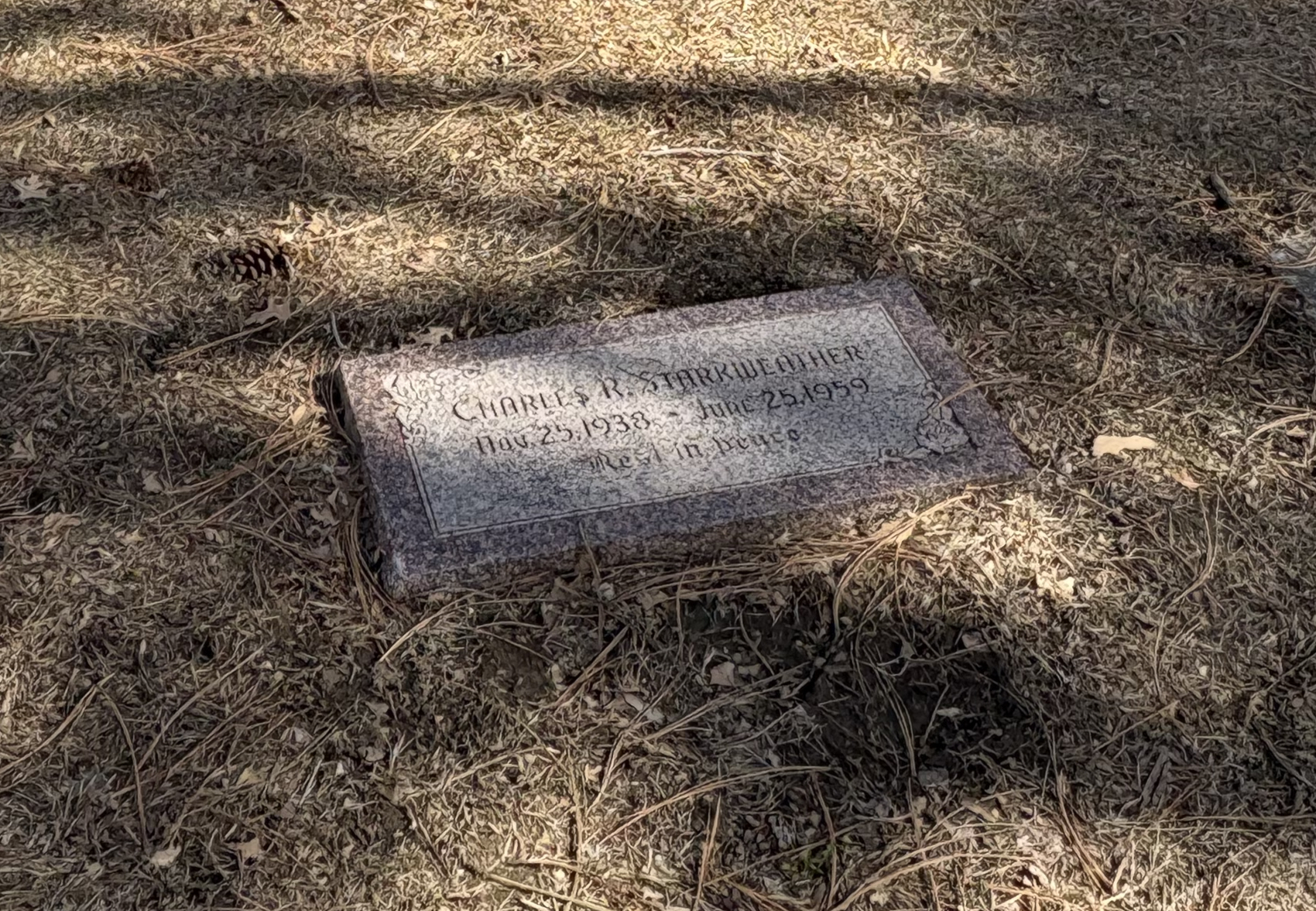
Starkweather's grave at Wyuka Cemetery

Starkweather was convicted after the jury deliberated for 22 hours for the murder of Jensen, the only murder for which he was tried. On May 23, 1958, he was sentenced to death, and Starkweather was executed in the electric chair at the Nebraska State Penitentiary in Lincoln, at 12:05 a.m. on June 25, 1959. Half an hour before the execution, the doctor who was supposed to pronounce Starkweather dead, B.A. Finkel, suffered a fatal heart attack. Starkweather gave no last words but in a letter from prison to his parents, wrote: "but dad I'm not real sorry for what I did cause for the first time me and Caril have (sic) more fun." He was reportedly indifferent about his impending death and had become resigned to his fate.

Starkweather is buried in Wyuka Cemetery in Lincoln, as are five of his victims, including the Wards.

Fugate was convicted as an accomplice and received a life sentence on November 21, 1958. She was paroled in June 1976 after serving seventeen and a half years at the Nebraska Correctional Center for Women in York, Nebraska. She settled in Hillsdale, Michigan.

== Victims ==
Murders in 1957–1958:

1. Robert Colvert (21), gas station attendant
2. Marion Bartlett (58), Fugate's stepfather
3. Velda Bartlett (36), Fugate's mother
4. Betty Jean Bartlett (2), Fugate's sister
5. August Meyer (70), Starkweather family's friend
6. Robert Jensen (17), boyfriend to Carol King
7. Carol King (16), girlfriend to Robert Jensen
8. Lillian Fencl (51), maid in the Ward household
9. Clara Ward (50), Chester Lauer Ward's wife
10. Chester Lauer Ward (47), industrialist
11. Merle Collison (34), traveling salesman

== See also ==
- List of people executed in Nebraska (pre-1972)
- List of people executed in the United States in 1959
- List of rampage killers in the United States

== Footnotes ==
Executions carried out in Nebraska
Preceded by Roland Sundahl April 30, 1952	Charles Starkweather; June 25, 1959	Succeeded by Harold Lamont Otey September 2, 1994
