= Nebraska Correctional Center for Women =

State correctional facility

Coordinates: 40°51′51″N 97°37′42″W

- Interactive map of Nebraska Correctional Center for Women
- Location: 1107 Recharge Road York, Nebraska
- Status: Open
- Security class: Mixed
- Capacity: 275
- Opened: 1920
- Managed by: Nebraska Department of Correctional Services

The Nebraska Correctional Center for Women (NCCW) is a state correctional facility for the Nebraska Department of Correctional Services. Located in Baker Precinct, York County, Nebraska, just west of York, it is the only secure Nebraska state facility to house adult women.

Created by an act of the Nebraska State Legislature establishing the "State Reformatory for Women." The original facility opened in May 1920 and consisted of a two-story house that was used as an inmate and staff residence. The facility was a working dairy farm. The inmates assisted with the livestock. The current institution consists of 11 buildings on 27 acres (110,000 m^{2}) of land, secured by two security fences. NCCW houses all security classification levels of female inmates including those in its own Diagnostic and Evaluation Center (D&E) (All male new commitments are taken to the Nebraska Diagnostic and Evaluation Center located in Lincoln). The NCCW D&E houses all new commitments. The average stay of a new commitment in the NCCW D&E is 30 days. This allows the inmate time to adjust to the institution and to learn about the institution's programs, rules, and regulations. During the evaluation period staff develop a personalized classification plan for the inmate.

NCCW has been accredited by the American Correctional Association since 1981.

- Security Levels: NCCW houses all classifications levels of female inmates including new commitments, court-ordered evaluators, and safe-keepers from county facilities.
- Average Population: 281
- Number of Staff: 116
- Cost per Inmate per Year: $29,417.00

== Notable inmates ==
- Caril Ann Fugate, spree killer, paroled in 1976 after 18 years in the facility
- Shanna “Liz” Golyar, murdered Cari Farver in 2012.
- Bailey Boswell, murdered Sydney Loofe in 2017.
