= Nebraska State Penitentiary =

State prison in Lincoln, Nebraska, U.S.

Coordinates: 40°46′05″N 96°42′11″W

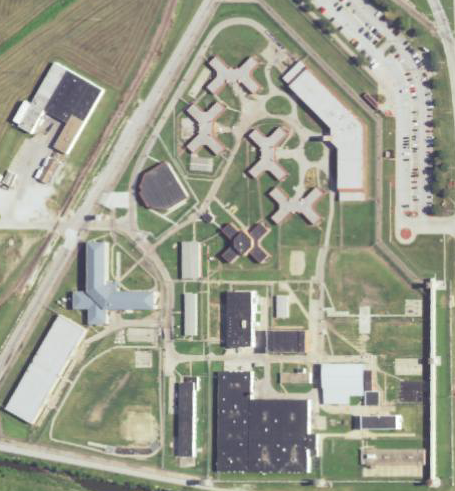
- Aerial view of the prison in 2022
- Interactive map of Nebraska State Penitentiary
- Location: 4201 S 14th Street, Lincoln, Nebraska, United States
- Status: Open
- Security class: Mixed
- Capacity: Over 1,300
- Opened: 1869
- Managed by: Nebraska Department of Correctional Services

The Nebraska State Penitentiary (NSP) is a state correctional facility operated by the Nebraska Department of Correctional Services. Located in Lincoln, Nebraska, United States, it is the oldest state correctional facility in Nebraska, having opened in 1869. Until after World War I, it was the only adult correctional institution in the state. The NSP has been accredited by the American Correctional Association since 1985.

== History ==
The Nebraska State Penitentiary was authorized in 1867 when a bill appropriated $40,000 to build a state prison. It was originally planned for construction in Bellevue, Nebraska, but the site was later moved to Lincoln. The facility opened in 1869. Initially, the prison consisted of temporary structures until permanent facilities were constructed in the early to mid-1870s. In 1890, a 240-cell building was added as part of the prison’s expansion.

Riots occurred in 1948 and 1955, causing minor injuries and property damage that required partial demolition and repairs. In 1979, plans were announced to demolish the 1876 structure—the second-oldest building on site—and replace it with new “double-Y”-shaped facilities designed by the architecture firm Leo A. Daly.

Although preservation efforts were considered due to the building’s historical significance, the new construction was completed in 1981, and the old cellblock was fully demolished by 1982. Two 100-bed modular housing units were later added in 1998.

The death penalty, used at the penitentiary since 1903, was abolished in Nebraska in 2015. However, voters reinstated it in 2016, allowing executions to continue. In 2021, a new 100-bed minimum-security dormitory was added.

In August 2025, nearly 400 inmates were relocated after severe storms caused extensive roof damage to two buildings in Lincoln.

In 2021, the Nebraska State Legislature proposed the construction of a new prison. In August 2023, the Nebraska Department of Correctional Services purchased a 300-acre parcel north of Lincoln to build a 1,512-bed multi-custody replacement facility.

Although construction was expected to begin in late 2024, the project experienced budget and funding challenges. Hausmann Construction was awarded the contract in June 2025, and building began the following month. The facility is expected to be substantially completed by August 2028.

== Criticism ==
The Nebraska State Penitentiary has faced extensive criticism for issues including overcrowding, inadequate medical care, and multiple wrongful death lawsuits.

Reports have indicated that the penitentiary is among the most overcrowded correctional facilities in the United States, with some accounts stating it has surpassed Alabama’s prisons in that regard. As of 2022, the facility was operating at approximately 151% of its designed capacity.

The penitentiary has also been criticized for its use of double-bunking in restrictive housing units—a practice cited as a contributing factor in the 2017 killing of a 22-year-old inmate.

== Notable inmates ==
- Vince Champ – convicted sex offender and former comedian.
- George Contant – brother of John Sontag; the pair were known as the Sontag Brothers. Imprisoned for theft, later transferred to Folsom State Prison in California for train robbery.
- Nikko Jenkins – spree killer currently on death row.
- John Joubert – serial killer executed in 1996.
- Carey Dean Moore – executed in 2018.
- Harold Lamont Otey – executed in 1994; the first person executed in Nebraska since 1959.
- Charles Starkweather – Nebraska spree killer sentenced to death; executed in the prison’s electric chair on June 25, 1959.
- William Leslie Arnold – at age 16, murdered his parents in 1958 and was sentenced to life imprisonment. In 1967, Arnold escaped from the penitentiary with another inmate. While his accomplice was later recaptured, Arnold remained a fugitive until his death in 2010. In 2022, DNA testing confirmed he had been living under the name John Damon in Australia.
- Duane Earl Pope – serving a life sentence for the 1965 robbery of the Farmers State Bank in Big Springs, Nebraska, during which three people were killed and one was severely injured.
- Robert E. Williams – spree killer executed in 1997.
