= Nebraska Department of Correctional Services =

U.S. state corrections agency

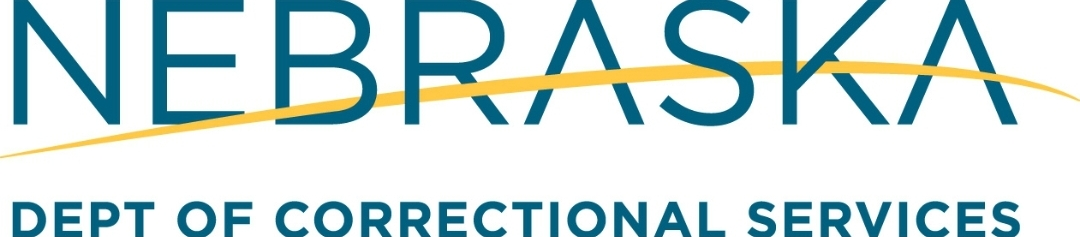
- Abbreviation: NDCS

Jurisdictional structure
- Operations jurisdiction: Nebraska, U.S.
- Map of Nebraska Department of Correctional Services's jurisdiction
- Area: 77,421 square miles (200,520 km^{2})
- Population: 1,783,432 (2008 est.)

Operational structure
- Headquarters: Building #1; Lincoln Regional Center; Lincoln, Nebraska
- Agency executive: Rob Jeffreys, Director

Facilities
- Correctional Facilities: 11

Website
- www.corrections.state.ne.us

The Nebraska Department of Correctional Services (NDCS) is the state corrections agency for the U.S. state of Nebraska. NDCS currently has 9 institutions confining over 5,000 inmates. All male inmates coming into the system enter through the [Reception and Treatment Center (RTC)]] where they are evaluated and assigned to other facilities. All female inmates are housed at the Nebraska Correctional Center for Women. The agency's headquarters is in Building #1 in the Lincoln Regional Center in Lincoln, Nebraska.

Nebraska is one of nine states nationwide having all adult facilities accredited through the American Correctional Association.

== Facilities ==
Previously the department operated juvenile correctional facilities, including the Youth Rehabilitation & Treatment Center–Kearney (YRTC-K) in Kearney, a juvenile correctional facility for boys, and the Youth Rehabilitation & Treatment Center–Geneva (YRTC-G) in unincorporated Fillmore County, near Geneva, for girls. After 23 years of operation from the Department of Correctional Services; on January 1, 1997, the youth correctional facilities were transferred out of the scope of the department; the facilities are now managed by the Nebraska Department of Health and Human Services.

== Fallen officers ==
Since the establishment of the Nebraska Department of Correctional Services, 6 officers have died in the line of duty.

== Death penalty in Nebraska ==
All executions in Nebraska since 1903 have taken place within the Nebraska State Penitentiary. Prior to 1903, executions were handled in the county where the offense took place. From 1903 to 1913, the means of execution was by hanging. From 1913 it had been by the electric chair until August 14, 2018, when Carey Dean Moore was executed by a lethal injection of fentanyl. A total of 8 inmates were executed by hanging and 15 inmates by means of the electric chair. There have been approximately 68 inmates housed on death row from 1903 to the present.

Death row in Nebraska was housed at NSP from 1903 to 2002 when it was transferred to the Tecumseh State Correctional Institution. Executions still take place at the Penitentiary. Inmates who receive an execution date would be transferred to NSP approximately within a week of that date and would be housed in the penitentiary hospital on what is called the "death watch." While on the death watch, condemned inmates may have special visits from family, friends, religious representatives and attorneys. The visits are supervised by staff assigned to the death watch and take place in the suite of rooms set aside for the condemned inmates. Inmates may also request a special "last meal." Such meals must be prepared from food supplies on hand at the prison.

== See also ==
- List of United States state correction agencies
- List of United States state and local law enforcement agencies
- List of law enforcement agencies in Nebraska
