= Capital punishment in Nebraska =

Capital punishment is a legal penalty in the U.S. state of Nebraska. In 2015, the state legislature voted to repeal the death penalty, overriding governor Pete Ricketts' veto. However, a petition drive secured enough signatures to suspend the repeal until a public vote. In the November 2016 general election, voters rejected the repeal measure, preserving capital punishment in the state. Nebraska currently has 12 inmates on death row.

On August 14, 2018, Nebraska executed Carey Dean Moore, convicted of murder, in what was the state's first execution in 21 years, and the first by lethal injection. Moore’s execution was also notable for being the first in the US to be carried-out using fentanyl, a powerful opioid painkiller.

== History ==
Hanging was the method of execution in Nebraska until the execution of Albert Prince in 1913. After Prince's execution, a new law was passed requiring the use of the electric chair. Allen Grammer was the first person executed by electrocution in Nebraska (his partner in crime, Alson Cole, would be executed 13 minutes later).

In 1959, the state electrocuted Charles Starkweather, who killed 11 people in a two-month murder spree.

On February 8, 2008, the Nebraska Supreme Court declared in State v. Mata that electrocution constitutes a "cruel and unusual punishment" under the Nebraska Constitution. The state legislature subsequently approved a bill to change its method of execution to lethal injection, which was signed by governor Dave Heineman on May 28, 2009. Nebraska was the last state to adopt lethal injection as its execution method. The first execution in these states using the method was carried out on August 14, 2018.

A total of 38 individuals have been executed in Nebraska, including four after 1976, when the U.S. Supreme Court upheld the constitutionality of capital punishment in Gregg v. Georgia.

In August 2018, Carey Dean Moore was executed by lethal injection for the murders of cabdrivers Maynard Helgeland and Reuel Van Ness Jr. in 1979.

=== Sodium thiopental issue ===
In 2011 and 2012, state officials imported sodium thiopental on two occasions from suppliers based in India and Switzerland. The suppliers said they discovered only after delivering the drugs that these would be used in executions, prompting them to demand the return of the chemicals. The state refused, and engaged in a legal battle with the United States FDA and the suppliers to keep them. Since the drugs expired in 2013 and became unusable, the state was unable to carry out any execution until it found another way to obtain the chemicals. The state later replaced thiopental with fentanyl as an execution drug.

== 2015 repeal ==
On 27 May 2015, the unicameral Nebraska State Legislature voted 32–15 on a measure to abolish the death penalty in the state. The bill was introduced by senator Ernie Chambers, an African-American from Omaha, who had introduced similar pieces of legislation over prior decades. Governor Pete Ricketts vetoed the legislation, but the legislature voted 30–19 to override the veto.

In the summer of 2015, an organization called "Nebraskans for the Death Penalty", gathered signatures on a petition to repeal the bill. Ricketts and his father, Joe Ricketts, contributed one third of the $913,000 raised by the group. The petition's organizers submitted 120,479 valid signatures, more than 10% of the registered voters in the state, and thus sufficient to suspend the bill and preserve the death penalty until a public vote could be held.

Death penalty opponents then filed a lawsuit to cancel the referendum, arguing that Ricketts was the "primary initiating force" for the measure, and should have been included on the list of sponsors required by state law. In February 2016, a Lancaster County District Judge dismissed the lawsuit; in July 2016, the Nebraska Supreme Court affirmed the District Court's dismissal. After this defeat, death penalty opponents began a campaign to retain the repeal bill, and changed their name from "Nebraskans for Public Safety" to "Retain a Just Nebraska".

In the November 2016 general election, the death penalty repeal was rejected by a 61–39 margin, thereby retaining capital punishment in the state.

== Current legislation ==
=== Legal process ===
Nebraska is the only state where a sentence of death is decided by a three-judge panel, after a trial finds the defendant eligible for the death penalty.

The panel includes the presiding judge of the trial and two others judges appointed for that purpose by the state's chief justice. The death sentence must be unanimous, otherwise life imprisonment is imposed.

Clemency is decided by a three-member board comprising the governor, the attorney general and the secretary of state.

Death row inmates are housed at Tecumseh State Correctional Institution (for males) and Nebraska Correctional Center for Women (for females). Executions have been carried out at Nebraska State Penitentiary (Lincoln) since 1903.

=== Capital offenses ===
Aggravating factors making murder punishable by death are the following:

1. The offender was previously convicted of another murder or a crime involving the use or threat of violence to the person, or has a substantial prior history of serious assaultive or terrorizing criminal activity;
2. The murder was committed in an effort to conceal the commission of a crime, or to conceal the identity of the perpetrator of such crime;
3. The murder was committed for hire, or for pecuniary gain, or the defendant hired another to commit the murder for the defendant;
4. The murder was especially heinous, atrocious, cruel, or manifested exceptional depravity by ordinary standards of morality and intelligence;
5. At the time the murder was committed, the offender also committed another murder;
6. The offender knowingly created a great risk of death to at least several persons;
7. The victim was a public servant having lawful custody of the offender or another in the lawful performance of his or her official duties and the offender knew or should have known that the victim was a public servant performing his or her official duties;
8. The murder was committed knowingly to disrupt or hinder the lawful exercise of any governmental function or the enforcement of the laws;
9. The victim was a law enforcement officer engaged in the lawful performance of his or her official duties as a law enforcement officer and the offender knew or reasonably should have known that the victim was a law enforcement officer.

== See also ==
- List of people executed in Nebraska
- List of death row inmates in the United States § Nebraska
- Crime in Nebraska
- Law of Nebraska
