= Deaths in May 1997 =

The following is a list of notable deaths in May 1997.

Entries for each day are listed alphabetically by surname. A typical entry lists information in the following sequence:

- Name, age, country of citizenship at birth, subsequent country of citizenship (if applicable), reason for notability, cause of death (if known), and reference.

== May 1997 ==
=== 1 ===
- Elena Altieri, 80, Italian actress.
- Tridib Chaudhuri, 85, Indian politician and Indian independence activist.
- Russell G. Cleary, 63, American brewer, complications from heart surgery.
- Friedl Däuber, 86, German alpine and cross-country skier and Olympian (1936).
- Fernand Dumont, 69, Canadian sociologist, philosopher, and theologian.
- Ralph Earhart, 74, American football player (Green Bay Packers).
- Jim McDonald, 81, American football player (Detroit Lions), and coach.
- Arthur Milne, 82, Scottish football player.
- Bo Widerberg, 66, Swedish actor and film director, stomach cancer.

=== 2 ===
- Raymond Sarif Easmon, 84, Sierra Leonean doctor and writer.
- Sir John Eccles, 94, Australian neurophysiologist, recipient of the Nobel Prize in Physiology or Medicine.
- Heinz Ellenberg, 83, German biologist, botanist and ecologist.
- Paulo Freire, 75, Brazilian educator and philosopher, heart attack.
- Walter Hill, 62, American serial killer, execution by electrocution.
- Robin Kinahan, 80, Northern Irish politician and Orange Order member.
- Werner Lott, 89, German U-boat commander during World War II.
- David Madson, 33, American LGBTQ+ and HIV/AIDS activist, shot.
- Ralph McCreath, 78, Canadian figure skater.
- Queen Mother Moore, 98, African-American civil rights leader and a black nationalist.
- Don O'Riley, 52, American baseball player (Kansas City Royals), shot.
- Keith R. Porter, 84, Canadian-American cell biologist, pneumonia.
- Eugene Vale, 81, American novelist.
- Jimmy Wilson, 77, American Negro league baseball player.

=== 3 ===
- Bruce Beetham, 61, New Zealand academic and politician, heart failure.
- Gerrit den Braber, 68, Dutch songwriter and lyricist, stroke.
- Sébastien Enjolras, 21, French racing driver, racing accident.
- Hughie Green, 77, English presenter, game show host and actor, cancer.
- Sir John Junor, 78, British journalist and editor of the Daily Express.
- Louis, Prince Napoléon, 83, French member of the Bonaparte dynasty.
- Narciso Yepes, 69, Spanish guitarist, cancer.

=== 4 ===
- Suhayr al-Qalamawi, 85, Egyptian literary figure and politician.
- Jerome Alden, 76, American playwright and screenwriter, kidney cancer.
- Egidio Armelloni, 87, Italian Olympic gymnast (1936, 1948).
- Wijeyananda Dahanayake, 94, Sri Lankan politician.
- Rudolf Edinger, 94, Austrian weightlifter and Olympian (1924).
- Esin Engin, 51, Turkish musician, composer, and film actor, leukemia.
- Hilary Grivich, 19, American gymnast and diver, traffic collision.
- Fernando Hernández, 52, Costa Rican footballer, cancer.
- Lee Miglin, 72, American businessman and philanthropist, stabbed.
- Alvy Moore, 75, American actor (Green Acres, The Littles, Nausicaä of the Valley of the Wind), heart failure.
- Lyman Bradford Smith, 92, American botanist.
- Lou Stathis, 44, American author, critic and editor, brain tumor.
- Butch Weis, 96, American baseball player (Chicago Cubs).

=== 5 ===
- Giulio Balestrini, 89, Italian footballer.
- Bob Briggs, 52, American gridiron football player (San Diego Chargers, Cleveland Browns, Kansas City Chiefs).
- Sir George Burns, 86, British Army officer.
- Walter Gotell, 73, German actor (From Russia with Love, The Spy Who Loved Me, The Living Daylights), cancer.
- Alan Gussow, 65, American artist, author and conservationist, cancer.
- Dick Ives, 71, American college basketball player (Iowa Hawkeyes).
- Murray Kempton, 79, American journalist and Pulitzer Prize winner, pancreatic cancer.
- David Scherman, 81, American photojournalist and editor, cancer.
- Jumpin' Joe Williams, 82, American football player (Cleveland Rams, Pittsburgh Pirates).

=== 6 ===
- Ridge Bond, 74, American actor and singer.
- Sydney Joseph Freedberg, 82, American art historian and curator.
- Jorge Martínez de Hoyos, 76, Mexican actor, lung cancer.
- John Edwards Hill, 68, British mammalogist.
- Günther Jerschke, 75, German actor.
- Wang You, 86, Chinese biochemist.

=== 7 ===
- John C. Ewers, 87, American ethnologist and museum curator.
- Yip Hon, 93, Chinese gambling tycoon, heart attack.
- George Lynch, 78, American race car driver.
- Tom Lysons, 62, Canadian politician.

=== 8 ===
- Joachim Angermeyer, 73, German businessman and politician.
- Bijoy Chandra Bhagavati, 93, Indian politician.
- Ralph Wendell Burhoe, 85, American theologian.
- Scott Carpenter, 22, American convicted murderer, execution by lethal injection.
- Pat Hughes, 94, English tennis player.
- Robert H. Krieble, 80, American chemist.
- Bernhard Nooni, 88, Estonian football player.
- Clara Ottesen, 85, Norwegian government official, aid worker and politician.
- Nunzio Provenzano, 74, American mobster.
- William R. Royal, 92, American Air Force scuba diver.
- Michael Shersby, 64, British politician.
- Kai-Uwe von Hassel, 84, German politician, heart attack.
- Micheline Kerney Walsh, 77, Irish archivist and historian.
- Bob Whitcher, 80, American baseball player (Boston Braves).

=== 9 ===
- Rawya Ateya, 71, Egyptian woman and first female parliamentarian in the Arab world.
- Augusto Céspedes Patzi, 93, Bolivian writer, politician, diplomat, and journalist.
- Bob Devaney, 82, American gridiron football coach, heart attack.
- Marco Ferreri, 68, Italian film director, screenwriter and actor, heart attack.
- Pierre Garsau, 35, Algerian-born French Olympic water polo player (1988, 1992).
- Willy Hess, 90, Swiss musicologist and composer.
- Hoke Howell, 67, American actor.
- Kazumi Kawai, 32, Japanese actress, suicide by jumping.
- Rina Lasnier, 81, Québécois poet.
- Marie-Thérèse Paquin, 91, Canadian pianist.
- Paul Zastupnevich, 75, American costume designer.

=== 10 ===
- Bernard Anderson, 77, American jazz trumpeter.
- Jacinto Quincoces, 91, Spanish football player, manager, and Olympian (1928).
- Silvano Tranquilli, 71, Italian actor.
- Joan Weston, 62, American Roller derby skater, Creutzfeldt-Jakob disease.
- Orton Havergal Hicks, 96, veteran film industry executive and entrepreneur, founder & former president of Films, Inc.
- Prof Heng-tse TU, 84, former Head of the Department of Political Science and Dean of the College of Liberal Arts, Soochow University

=== 11 ===
- William Ragsdale Cannon, 81, American theologian and bishop of the United Methodist Church.
- David Christie, 49, French singer-songwriter, suicide.
- Ernie Fields, 92, American trombonist, pianist, arranger and bandleader.
- Markus Gähler, 31, Swiss Olympic ski jumper (1992).
- Genine Graham, 70, English actress.
- Dean M. Kelley, 70, American legal scholar, cancer.
- Catherine McLeod, 75, American actress.
- Howard Morton, 71, American actor, stroke.
- Vince Sherlock, 87, American baseball player (Brooklyn Dodgers).
- Peter Stackpole, 83, American photographer.

=== 12 ===
- Louis Barbarin, 94, American jazz drummer.
- Charles-Arthur Gauthier, 84, Canadian politician, member of the House of Commons of Canada (1962-1980).
- Einar Gundersen, 81, Norwegian footballer.
- Jiří Pecka, 79, Czechoslovak slalom and sprint canoeist and Olympian (1948).
- Henk Plenter, 83, Dutch football player.
- Avraham Yitzchak Stern, 61, Israeli administrator and politician.
- Frank A. Wenstrom, 93, American politician.
- Eric Whiteside, 92, Indian Olympic sprinter (1936).

=== 13 ===
- Olle Dahlberg, 68, Swedish Olympic speed skater (1956, 1960).
- Laurie Lee, 82, English poet, novelist and screenwriter, colorectal cancer.
- Carlos Augusto León, 82, Venezuelan poet, historian, politician and scientist.
- Tommy Turrentine, 69, American swing and hard bop trumpeter and composer.
- Zdeňka Veřmiřovská, 83, Czechoslovak/Czech gymnast and Olympian (1936, 1948).
- Eduard Zakharov, 22, Russian boxer and Olympian (1996), stabbed.

=== 14 ===
- Jambyn Batmönkh, 71, Mongolian communist politician.
- Mel Bay, 84, American musician and music publisher.
- Harry Blackstone, Jr., 62, American magician and television performer, pancreatic cancer.
- Thelma Carpenter, 75, American jazz singer and actress, cardiac arrest.
- Bernie Constable, 76, English cricketer.
- Eddie Delker, 91, American baseball player (St. Louis Cardinals, Philadelphia Phillies).
- Samuel Hoyt Elbert, 89, American linguist.
- Alan Furlan, 77, Italian-American actor.
- Morton Heilig, 70, American virtual reality technology pioneer and filmmaker.
- Boris Parsadanian, 72, Armenian-Estonian composer.
- Val Peat, 50, British sprinter and Olympian (1968).
- Bessie Schonberg, 90, German-American dancer and choreographer.

=== 15 ===
- Oscar Berger, 96, American editorial cartoonist.
- Eric Dwyer, 79, Australian cricketer.
- David Martin, 89, American politician, member of the United States House of Representatives (1961-1974), pneumonia.
- Matylda Ossadnik, 80, Polish Olympic gymanst (1936).
- Trevor Porteous, 63, English football player and coach.
- Saadallah Wannous, Syrian playwright, cancer.

=== 16 ===
- Donatien Mahele Lieko Bokungu, 56, Zairean general, execution by firing squad.
- Flor Crowley, 62, Irish Fianna Fáil politician.
- Giuseppe De Santis, 80, Italian film director (Bitter Rice), heart attack.
- Elbridge Durbrow, 93, American diplomat and ambassador, stroke.
- William McGregor, 47, Canadian Olympic judoka (1972).
- Bones McKinney, 78, American basketball player (Washington Capitols, Boston Celtics), and coach.
- Harry Charles Moore, 56, American convicted murderer, execution by lethal injection.
- Wang Zengqi, 77, Chinese writer.

=== 17 ===
- Tusten Ackerman, 95, American basketball player.
- Mikhail Bychkov, 70, Soviet Russian ice hockey player and Olympian (1960).
- Chris Julian, 60, English motorcycle racer, gyrocopter accident.
- Durgabai Kamat, 117/118, first Indian female actress of Indian cinema.
- Roscoe L. Koontz, 74, American health physicist.
- Oskar Zeissner, 68, German Olympic cyclist (1952).

=== 18 ===
- Bridgette Andersen, 21, American actress.
- Mikhail Anikushin, 79, Soviet and Russian sculptor.
- Horst Lippmann, 70, German concert promoter and jazz musician.
- Paolo Panelli, 71, Italian comedian and film actor, pulmonary edema.
- Antonio Cornejo Polar, 60, Peruvian academic and literature and cultural critic.
- Soenario, 94, Indonesian politician and Foreign Minister.
- Raymond Van Dijck, 62, Belgian Olympic pole vaulter (1960).

=== 19 ===
- Aaron Henry, 74, American civil rights leader and politician, congestive heart failure.
- Sombhu Mitra, 81, Indian actor, director and playwright.
- René Nyman, 80, Finnish Olympic sailor (1936, 1948, 1952, 1960).
- Troy Ruttman, 67, American race car driver, lung cancer.
- Pāvels Seņičevs, 72, Soviet Latvian Olympic sports shooter (1964, 1968).

=== 20 ===
- Joe Allen, 49, American college basketball player (Bradley Braves).
- Alex Friedmann, 78, Danish footballer.
- Eduardo Jardón, 82, Spanish Olympic field hockey player (1948).
- Don Parker, 88, British racing driver.
- John Rawlins, 94, American film editor and director.
- Wakafutase Tadayuki, 55, Japanese sumo wrestler.
- Virgilio Barco Vargas, 75, Colombian politician, cancer.
- Gopal Yonjan, 53, Nepalese musician, complications of jaundice.

=== 21 ===
- Ron Allan, 73, Australian rules footballer.
- William Aston, 80, Australian politician.
- Amasa Stone Bishop, 76, American nuclear physicist, pneumonia.
- Noël Browne, 81, Irish politician.
- Fiorenzo Carpi, 78, Italian composer and pianist.
- Piper Davis, 79, American baseball player.

=== 22 ===
- Myrtle Bachelder, 89, American chemist and Women's Army Corps officer.
- Alziro Bergonzo, 90, Italian architect and painter.
- Donald Curtis, 82, American actor.
- Herman de Coninck, 53, Belgian poet, essayist, journalist and publisher, heart attack.
- Genildo Ferreira de França, Brazilian spree killer, suicide by gunshot.
- Jimmy Heale, 82, English footballer.
- Alfred Hershey, 88, American biochemist and recipient of the Nobel Prize in Physiology or Medicine, heart failure.
- Raúl Gómez Jattin, 51, Colombian poet.
- Arthur Milne, 82, Scottish football player.
- Renzo Montagnani, 66, Italian actor, lung cancer.
- Candis Pettway, 72, American artist.
- Cornelius Michael Power, 83, American prelate of the Roman Catholic Church.
- T. R. Ramanna, 74, Indian film director and producer.
- Robert D. Russ, 64, United States Air Force general and commander of Tactical Air Command.
- Stanisław Swianiewicz, 97, Polish economist and historian.
- Klaus von Bismarck, 85, German broadcaster and cultural administrator.
- Paul Charles Weick, 97, American judge.

=== 23 ===
- Alison Adburgham, 85, English fashion journalist and author.
- James Lee Byars, 65, American conceptual and performance artist, cancer.
- Oswaldo Calero, 52, Colombian footballer.
- Albert Cheetham, 81, Australian cricketer.
- Dorothy Gulliver, 88, American actress, pneumonia.
- Ken Keuper, 78, American football player (Green Bay Packers, New York Giants).
- Sadayoshi Kobayashi, 92, Japanese Olympic field hockey player (1932).
- Lovie Lee, 88, American electric blues pianist and singer.
- David M. Ludlum, 86, American historian, meteorologist, and author.
- Albert Rosen, 73, Austrian-Irish conductor.

=== 24 ===
- Muhammad Fadhel al-Jamali, 94, Iraqi politician and Prime Minister (1953-1954).
- Alexandre Lippiani, 32, voice actor for Sheriff Woody in the first Toy Story movie
- M. Aram, 70, Indian educator and peace advocate.
- Kinpei Azusa, 66, Japanese voice actor, laryngeal cancer.
- Robbie Branscum, 62, American children's author, heart attack.
- Alfonso de Vinuesa, 38, Spanish racing driver, traffic collision.
- Jerzy Górski, 67, Polish Olympic canoeist (1956).
- Edward Mulhare, 74, Irish actor (Knight Rider, The Ghost and Mrs. Muir, Von Ryan's Express), lung cancer.
- Peter Rangmar, 40, Swedish comedian, actor and baritone.
- Sepp Weiler, 76, West German ski jumper and Olympian (1952).

=== 25 ===
- Syd Bidwell, 80, British politician.
- Chester Feldman, 71, American producer of game shows.
- Jay Hebert, 74, American golfer.
- Joseph Hoffman, 88, American screenwriter.
- Ronald Vernieux, 86, Indian sprinter and Olympian (1932).

=== 26 ===
- Jack Bennett, 76, Australian rules football player.
- Jenny Rosenthal Bramley, 87, Russian-American physicist.
- James Gordon, 88, American Olympic sprinter (1932).
- Ralph Horween, 100, American football player (Chicago Cardinals), and coach.
- Serge Hubert, 81, French Olympic sports shooter (1960).
- Bernard Jackson, 46, American football player (Cincinnati Bengals, Denver Broncos, San Diego Chargers), and coach, liver cancer.
- Jack Jersey, 55, Dutch singer, composer, and producer of light music, cancer.
- Erik Pausin, 77, Austrian figure skater and Olympian (1936).
- Jack Vinall, 86, English football player and manager.
- Manfred von Ardenne, 90, German physicist and inventor.

=== 27 ===
- Robert Ambelain, 89, French essayist.
- Henry Barakat, 82, Egyptian film director.
- Franc Cvenkelj, 72, Slovenian Olympic alpine skier (1956).
- Karl Martz, 84, American studio potter and ceramic artist.
- Nic Roeser, 100, Luxembourgian Olympic gymnast (1928).
- Azem Shkreli, 59, Albanian writer, poet, director and producer.

=== 28 ===
- Conway Baker, 85, American football player (Chicago Cardinals, Card-Pitt).
- Ronald V. Book, 60, American theoretical computer scientist.
- Sydney Guilaroff, 89, American Hollywood hairdresser, pneumonia.
- Édouard Muller, 77, French road bicycle racer.
- Sung Nak-woon, 71, South Korean football forward.
- John H. Sengstacke, 84, American newspaper publisher, stroke.
- John Stack, 73, American X-ray engineer, rower and Olympic champion (1948).
- Tatyana Sumarokova, 74, Soviet flight navigator during World War II.

=== 29 ===
- Jeff Buckley, 30, American singer, songwriter and guitarist, accidental drowning.
- George Fenneman, 77, American radio and television announcer, emphysema.
- Alexander Kazhdan, 74, Soviet-American Byzantinist.
- William H. McNichols, Jr., 87, American politician and mayor of Denver, Colorado (1968-1983).
- Jack Parkinson, 73, American basketball player (Kentucky Wildcats, Indianapolis Olympians), brain tumor, brain cancer.

=== 30 ===
- West Arkeen, 36, American musician and songwriter for Guns N' Roses, opiate overdose.
- Béla Barényi, 90, Austro-Hungarian automotive engineer.
- Winsome Cripps, 66, Australian sprinter and Olympian (1952).
- Doris Lindsey Holland Rhodes, 87, American politician.

=== 31 ===
- Expedito Alencar, 51, Brazilian Olympic boxer (1968).
- Pat Collins, 62, American hypnotist.
- Frei Damião, 98, Italian Roman Catholic priest and missionary, stroke.
- José González, 90, Spanish Olympic swimmer (1928).
- James Bennett Griffin, 92, American archaeologist.
- Fazal Haq Mujahid, Afghanistan mujahideen during the Soviet–Afghan War, assassinated.
- Kai Jensen, 100, Danish Olympic athlete (1924).
- Eddie Jones, 68, American jazz double bassist.
- Oswald Kaduk, 90, German SS officer and war criminal during World War II.
- Jewel Lafontant, 75, American lawyer and White House official, breast cancer.
- Ove Ljung, 79, Swedish Army officer.
- Günter Luther, 75, German admiral.
- Johnny Papalia, 73, Canadian mobster, shot.
- Poul Petersen, 76, Danish football player, manager and Olympian (1948, 1952).
- Leicester Spring, 88, New Zealand cricketer.

== Sources ==
- Liebman, Roy (2000). The Wampas Baby Stars: A Biographical Dictionary, 1922–1934. Jefferson, North Carolina: McFarland. ISBN 0-7864-0756-5.
