= Angermeyer =

Angermeyer is a German language occupational surname. Notable people with the name include:

- Heinz Angermeyer (1909–1988), German film producer
- Joachim Angermeyer (1923–1997), German businessman and politician
- Johanna Angermeyer (1992), American academic of English literature
