= List of people executed in Oregon =

The following is a list of people executed by the U.S. state of Oregon since capital punishment was resumed in the United States in 1976.

== List of people executed in Oregon since 1976 ==
In 1978, Oregon restored capital punishment, with new statutes going into effect that December 6th. On January 20, 1981, these laws were declared unconstitutional by the Oregon Supreme Court, but in November 1984 a new capital punishment statute was approved. Following this, only two prisoners were executed (both by lethal injection), and capital punishment in Oregon has subsequently been under a moratorium since 2011.

Name	Race	Age	Date of execution	County	Crime	Victim(s)	Governor
Douglas Franklin Wright	White	56	September 6, 1996	Marion	Murder	Three people, white (Note: Anthony Barker (27), William Marks (23), and William Davis (37). Known to have committed four other murders, receiving 35 year sentences for two of them.)	John Kitzhaber
Harry Charles Moore	White	56	May 16, 1997	Wasco	Murder	Thomas Lauri and Barbara Cunningham, 60 and 49, white	John Kitzhaber

== See also ==
- Capital punishment in Oregon
- Crime in Oregon
- List of people executed in Oregon (pre-1972)
