= Huang Liang =

Huang Liang, may refer to:

- Huang Liang (table tennis), Chinese table tennis player.
- Huang Liang (chemist), Chinese chemist, member of the Chinese Academy of Sciences.
