= Murder of Thelma Taylor =

1949 murder in Portland, Oregon, United States

Thelma Taylor
- Born: Thelma Anne Taylor; December 12, 1933; Portland, Oregon, U.S.
- Disappeared: August 5, 1949
- Died: August 6, 1949 (aged 15); Portland, Oregon, U.S.
- Cause of death: Blunt force trauma and stabbing
- Body discovered: August 11, 1949, in St. Johns, Portland, Oregon
- Resting place: Columbia Cemetery, Portland, Oregon, U.S. 45.58454°N 122.67721°W
- Known for: Homicide victim

Thelma Anne Taylor (December 12, 1933 – August 6, 1949) was an American teenager who was abducted and murdered in North Portland, Oregon in 1949, after having disappeared on August 5. Her body was discovered the following week, on August 11. Taylor's murder received national attention and became a cause célèbre. The perpetrator, Morris Leland, was executed in 1953. The murder occurred in the St. Johns neighborhood of North Portland near the St. Johns Bridge and land that is now known as Cathedral Park.

== Disappearance and murder ==
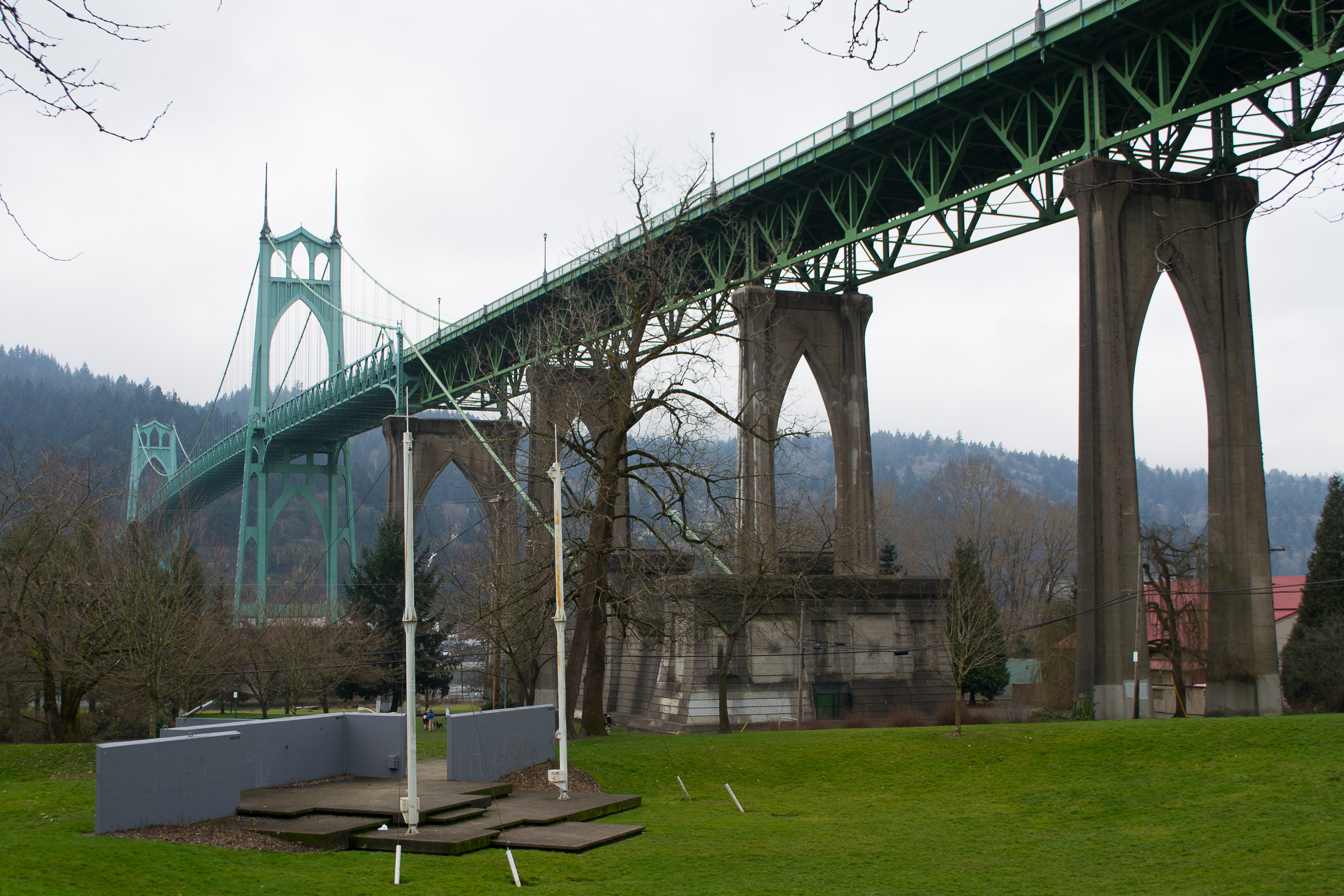
Cathedral Park in 2013, near the site of Thelma Taylor's murder

Shortly after 4:00 a.m. on the morning of August 5, 1949, Thelma Taylor, a 15-year-old sophomore at Roosevelt High School, was waiting for a bus on North Fessenden Street in the St. Johns neighborhood in north Portland, Oregon, intending to travel about 17 miles to the town of Hillsboro to obtain a summer job picking beans.

While Taylor was waiting for the bus, she was accosted by Morris Leland, a 22-year-old ex-convict, who asked her to accompany him to a secluded spot near the Willamette River and the St. Johns Bridge, a short distance from what is now the Cathedral Park neighborhood. Upon arriving at the sequestered area, Leland attempted to rape Taylor, but stopped upon discovering that she was a virgin. Leland continued to hold Taylor captive and that night the two slept in a wooded area near the Willamette River.

In the early morning of August 6, Taylor began screaming for help after hearing workers switching railroad cars at a nearby train yard. Leland then killed Taylor by bludgeoning her on the head with a steel rebar multiple times, then stabbing her with a knife. He then threw the rebar and knife into the river, wiped his fingerprints off of Taylor's lunch pail, and gathered up his cigarette butts. Leland buried Taylor's body in a shallow grave under a pile of rotten logs.

== Conviction and execution ==
Around 2:00 a.m. on August 11, 1949, Leland was arrested for car theft by the Portland Police, and subsequently confessed to kidnapping and murdering Taylor, though he wasn't a suspect in the crime. In his confession, Leland claimed Taylor had initially gone with him "willingly." On August 19, he was indicted on charges of first-degree murder. At his trial, Leland pleaded not guilty by reason of insanity. His trial began on October 4, 1949, and on November 11, he was convicted of murder and sentenced to death. Leland was initially sentenced to be executed on January 20, 1950, but this date was postponed after he petitioned for a new trial which was later denied.

On April 20, 1951, Leland was again sentenced to death; he was executed in the gas chamber at the Oregon State Penitentiary in Salem on January 9, 1953. Leland was cremated and interred in Portland Memorial Mausoleum.

== Legacy ==
Thelma Taylor was buried in Historic Columbian Cemetery in North Portland, near Delta Park. The actual site of Taylor's killing is now in an industrial area and is inaccessible to the general public. The land adjacent to that site has been redeveloped into a public park called Cathedral Park, which opened in 1980. The murder of Taylor near the land that became Cathedral Park has led to local folklore that the park is supposedly haunted by Taylor, although her murder didn't actually occur there.

== See also ==
- List of people executed in Oregon (pre-1972)
- Crime in Oregon
- List of murdered American children
- List of people executed in the United States in 1953
- List of solved missing person cases (pre-1950)

== Sources ==
- Dickey, Colin (2017). Ghostland: An American History in Haunted Places. New York: Penguin. ISBN 978-1-101-98020-0.
