= List of people executed in Oregon (pre-1972) =

The following is a list of people executed by the U.S. state of Oregon before capital punishment was resumed in the United States in 1976.

One hundred and twenty-eight people, all male, were executed in Oregon during the pre-Furman era, one hundred and eight by hanging, eighteen by gas chamber and two by firing squad. In February 1903, Oregon began transitioning hangings away from local prisons and into the state penitentiary in Salem. From 1914 to 1920, the state abolished capital punishment. In May 1937, the state announced its plans to replace hanging with gas asphyxiation, with the state penitentiary's new gas chamber arriving via rail shipment and installed that December. On November 2, 1964, the state voted again to abolish capital punishment.

Two unnamed Native Americans were executed by firing squad in May 1815, and one by hanging in 1840.

== List of people executed in Oregon (pre-1972) ==
| No. | Name | Race | Age | Sex | Date of execution | County | Method | Victim(s) | Governor | Ref. |
|---|---|---|---|---|---|---|---|---|---|---|
| 1 | Tiloukait | Native American | – | Male | June 2, 1850 | Clackamas | Hanging | Whitman massacre | Joseph Lane | Ref. |
| 2 | Tomahas | Native American | – | Male | June 2, 1850 | Clackamas | Hanging | Whitman massacre | Joseph Lane | |
| 3 | Kiasumpkin | Native American | – | Male | June 2, 1850 | Clackamas | Hanging | Whitman massacre | Joseph Lane | |
| 4 | Klokomos | Native American | – | Male | June 2, 1850 | Clackamas | Hanging | Whitman massacre | Joseph Lane | |
| 5 | Isaiachalakis | Native American | – | Male | June 2, 1850 | Clackamas | Hanging | Whitman massacre | Joseph Lane | |
| 6 | William Kendall | White | – | Male | April 18, 1851 | Marion | Hanging | William Hamilton | John P. Gaines | |
| 7 | Creed Turner | White | – | Male | December 4, 1851 | Washington | Hanging | E. A. Bradbury | John P. Gaines | |
| 8 | Return William Everman | White | 22 | Male | May 11, 1852 | Polk | Hanging | Cyrenus Hooker | John P. Gaines | |
| 9 | Adam E. Wimple | White | 37 | Male | October 8, 1852 | Polk | Hanging | Mary Allen | John P. Gaines | |
| 10 | Charles Roe | White | – | Male | 1859 | Marion | Hanging | Angelica Roe | John Whiteaker | |
| 11 | Danford Balch | White | 47 | Male | October 17, 1859 | Multnomah | Hanging | Mortimer Stump | John Whiteaker | |
| 12 | Matthew Moss | White | – | Male | March 20, 1860 | Polk | Hanging | George Harper | John Whiteaker | |
| 13 | Philip George | White | – | Male | June 22, 1860 | Benton | Hanging | John Clark | John Whiteaker | |
| 14 | Andrew Pate | White | – | Male | May 27, 1862 | Linn | Hanging | George Lamb | John Whiteaker | |
| 15 | Zebulon Griffith | White | – | Male | June 9, 1863 | Yamhill | Hanging | Franklin D. B. Shane | A. C. Gibbs | |
| 16 | George Beale | White | – | Male | May 17, 1865 | Marion | Hanging | Daniel Delaney | A. C. Gibbs | |
| 17 | George Baker | White | – | Male | May 17, 1865 | Marion | Hanging | Daniel Delaney | A. C. Gibbs | |
| 18 | William Cain | White | – | Male | August 3, 1865 | Grant | Hanging | Andrew Watson | A. C. Gibbs | |
| 19 | Thomas Smith | White | – | Male | May 10, 1866 | Linn | Hanging | 2 victims (Note: Sidney and Barbara Smith) | A. C. Gibbs | |
| 20 | Black Jim | Native American | – | Male | January 3, 1873 | Klamath | Hanging | 2 victims (Note: Edward R. S. Canby, Eleazar Thomas) | La Fayette Grover | |
| 21 | Schonchin John | Native American | – | Male | January 3, 1873 | Klamath | Hanging | 2 victims | La Fayette Grover | |
| 22 | Kintpuash | Native American | – | Male | January 3, 1873 | Klamath | Hanging | 2 victims | La Fayette Grover | |
| 23 | Boston Charley | Native American | – | Male | January 3, 1873 | Klamath | Hanging | 2 victims | La Fayette Grover | |
| 24 | William Kay Neil | White | – | Male | January 26, 1877 | Linn | Hanging | Seth W. Hayes | La Fayette Grover | |
| 25 | Sevier Lewis | White | – | Male | August 30, 1878 | Coos | Hanging | Z. T. Lewis (Note: Half brother) | Stephen F. Chadwick | |
| 26 | White Owl | Native American | – | Male | January 10, 1879 | Umatilla | Hanging | George Coggan | W. W. Thayer | |
| 27 | Quit-It-Tumps | Native American | – | Male | January 10, 1879 | Umatilla | Hanging | George Coggan | W. W. Thayer | |
| 28 | Aps | Native American | 30 | Male | January 18, 1879 | Umatilla | Hanging | George Coggan | W. W. Thayer | |
| 29 | James Cook | White | – | Male | February 7, 1879 | Wasco | Hanging | George Craig | W. W. Thayer | |
| 30 | Eugene Avery | White | 25 | Male | March 14, 1879 | Multnomah | Hanging | Walter O'Shea | W. W. Thayer | |
| 31 | James Johnson | White | 25 | Male | March 14, 1879 | Multnomah | Hanging | Walter O'Shea | W. W. Thayer | |
| 32 | Kat-Koo-At | Native American | – | Male | May 5, 1879 | Multnomah | Hanging | Thomas J. Brown | W. W. Thayer | |
| 33 | Ah Lee | Asian | – | Male | April 20, 1880 | Multnomah | Hanging | Chin Sue Ying | W. W. Thayer | |
| 34 | Arthur Edward Murphy | White | 31 | Male | January 5, 1881 | Umatilla | Hanging | T. D. French | W. W. Thayer | |
| 35 | Kat-At-Cha | Native American | – | Male | March 28, 1882 | Multnomah | Hanging | Unknown | W. W. Thayer | |
| 36 | Charles Rogers | White | – | Male | January 28, 1885 | Multnomah | Hanging | Sterry | Zenas Ferry Moody | |
| 37 | J. W. Murray | White | – | Male | February 13, 1885 | Multnomah | Hanging | Alfred Jenke | Zenas Ferry Moody | |
| 38 | Joseph Drake | Black | – | Male | March 20, 1885 | Marion | Hanging | David Swartz | Zenas Ferry Moody | |
| 39 | Louis O'Neil | White | – | Male | March 12, 1886 | Jackson | Hanging | Lewis McDaniel | Zenas Ferry Moody | |
| 40 | Richard Marple | White | 27 | Male | November 11, 1887 | Yamhill | Hanging | D. J. Corker | Sylvester Pennoyer | |
| 41 | William Landreth | White | 60 | Male | July 6, 1888 | Polk | Hanging | Symmie Ellis Antle | Sylvester Pennoyer | |
| 42 | Patrick McGinnis | White | – | Male | April 26, 1889 | Grant | Hanging | Robert Lockwood | Sylvester Pennoyer | |
| 43 | Che Gong | Asian | – | Male | August 9, 1889 | Multnomah | Hanging | Lee Yick | Sylvester Pennoyer | |
| 44 | Peter Sullivan | White | – | Male | November 15, 1889 | Grant | Hanging | John Bronkee | Sylvester Pennoyer | |
| 45 | John Gilman | White | – | Male | December 13, 1889 | Coos | Hanging | Chris Eationhover | Sylvester Pennoyer | |
| 46 | Pellico | Native American | – | Male | June 5, 1890 | Multnomah | Hanging | Unknown | Sylvester Pennoyer | |
| 47 | Ming How | Asian | – | Male | January 8, 1892 | Grant | Hanging | Ah Foo | Sylvester Pennoyer | |
| 48 | Fred Zorn | White | – | Male | August 19, 1892 | Umatilla | Hanging | 2 victims (Note: His wife and mother-in-law) | Sylvester Pennoyer | |
| 49 | John Reiter | White | 21 | Male | December 1, 1893 | Clatsop | Hanging | Victor Snellman | Sylvester Pennoyer | |
| 50 | John Hansen | White | 55 | Male | May 18, 1894 | Clatsop | Hanging | Caroline Hansen | Sylvester Pennoyer | |
| 51 | Lloyd Montgomery | White | 18 | Male | January 31, 1896 | Linn | Hanging | 3 victims (Note: His parents:John and Elizabeth Montgomery, Daniel B. McKerchner) | William Paine Lord | |
| 52 | Carl Albrecht | White | – | Male | June 26, 1896 | Coos | Hanging | Mrs. Albrecht | William Paine Lord | |
| 53 | Lemuel W. Melson | White | 42 | Male | July 2, 1897 | Josephine | Hanging | Charles Perry | William Paine Lord | |
| 54 | Kelsay Porter | White | 47 | Male | November 20, 1897 | Union | Hanging | Benjamin Mache | William Paine Lord | |
| 55 | Augustus Wachlin | White | 24 | Male | February 4, 1898 | Washington | Hanging | John Lederock | William Paine Lord | |
| 56 | Charles Frester | White | – | Male | June 11, 1898 | Josephine | Hanging | Mrs. Frester | William Paine Lord | |
| 57 | Claude Branton | White | – | Male | May 12, 1899 | Lane | Hanging | John A. Linn | Theodore Thurston Geer | |
| 58 | William Magers | White | 26 | Male | February 2, 1900 | Polk | Hanging | Raymond Sink | Theodore Thurston Geer | |
| 59 | Coleman Gillespie | White | 20 | Male | October 5, 1900 | Curry | Hanging | Christina Edson | Theodore Thurston Geer | |
| 60 | B. H. Dalton | White | 23 | Male | January 31, 1902 | Multnomah | Hanging | James B. Morrow | Theodore Thurston Geer | |
| 61 | Joseph Wade | White | 20 | Male | January 31, 1902 | Multnomah | Hanging | James B. Morrow | Theodore Thurston Geer | |
| 62 | August Schieve | White | – | Male | July 2, 1902 | Columbia | Hanging | Joseph Schulkowski | Theodore Thurston Geer | |
| 63 | E. L. Belding | White | – | Male | March 27, 1903 | Multnomah | Hanging | 3 victims | George Earle Chamberlain | |
| 64 | Elliott Lyons | White | 35 | Male | April 17, 1903 | Lane | Hanging | W. W. Withers | George Earle Chamberlain | |
| 65 | George Smith | Black | – | Male | June 5, 1903 | Multnomah | Hanging | Annie Smith | George Earle Chamberlain | |
| 66 | Pleasant Armstrong | White | – | Male | January 22, 1904 | Baker | Hanging | Minnie Ensminger | George Earle Chamberlain | |
| 67 | Harry D. Egbert | White | 27 | Male | January 29, 1904 | Harney | Hanging | Jack Saxton | George Earle Chamberlain | |
| 68 | Frank Guglielmo | White | 23 | Male | May 5, 1905 | Multnomah | Hanging | Freda Garacia | George Earle Chamberlain | |
| 69 | George W. Lauth | White | 25 | Male | July 13, 1905 | Clackamas | Hanging | Leonora B. Jones | George Earle Chamberlain | |
| 70 | Norman Williams | White | 55 | Male | July 21, 1905 | Wasco | Hanging | 2 victims (Note: Louisa and Alma Nesbitt) | George Earle Chamberlain | |
| 71 | John C. Barnes | White | – | Male | September 18, 1906 | Douglas | Hanging | William Graham | George Earle Chamberlain | |
| 72 | Fred A. Shepherd | White | 23 | Male | November 30, 1906 | Crook | Hanging | Ben F. Zell | George Earle Chamberlain | |
| 73 | Henry Hose | White | 32 | Male | December 21, 1906 | Multnomah | Hanging | Madge Doyle | George Earle Chamberlain | |
| 74 | Holliver Megorden | White | – | Male | June 28, 1907 | Malheur | Hanging | Mary Megorden | George Earle Chamberlain | |
| 75 | Walter M. Johnson | White | 28 | Male | February 5, 1909 | Washington | Hanging | Elmer Perdue | George Earle Chamberlain | |
| 76 | C. Y. Timmons | White | 37 | Male | February 26, 1909 | Marion | Hanging | Stella Timmons | George Earle Chamberlain | |
| 77 | Adolph N. Nordstrom | White | 28 | Male | June 18, 1909 | Tillamook | Hanging | John Peterson | Frank W. Benson | |
| 78 | Joseph Anderson | White | – | Male | July 2, 1909 | Multnomah | Hanging | Harry Logan | Frank W. Benson | |
| 79 | Matthias Jancigaj | White | 28 | Male | October 22, 1909 | Clackamas | Hanging | Mary Schmerker | Frank W. Benson | |
| 80 | James Finch | White | – | Male | November 12, 1909 | Multnomah | Hanging | Ralph Fisher | Frank W. Benson | |
| 81 | John D. Roselair | White | 47 | Male | September 8, 1910 | Washington | Hanging | Lizette Dombrower | Jay Bowerman | |
| 82 | Isaac Newton Harrell | White | 48 | Male | September 9, 1910 | Lake | Hanging | Walter Newell | Jay Bowerman | |
| 83 | H. E. Roberts | White | – | Male | December 13, 1912 | Multnomah | Hanging | 2 victims (Note: Don M. Stewart, George Hastings) | Oswald West | |
| 84 | Mike Morgan | White | – | Male | December 13, 1912 | Josephine | Hanging | John E. York | Oswald West | |
| 85 | Frank Garrison | White | – | Male | December 13, 1912 | Coos | Hanging | Roy Perkins | Oswald West | |
| 86 | Noble Faulder | White | – | Male | December 13, 1912 | Klamath | Hanging | Louis Gebhardt | Oswald West | |
| 87 | George Humphrey | White | – | Male | March 22, 1913 | Benton | Hanging | Eliza Griffith | Oswald West | |
| 88 | Charles Humphrey | White | – | Male | March 22, 1913 | Benton | Hanging | Eliza Griffith | Oswald West | |
| 89 | Frank Seymour | Mixed | 17 | Male | October 31, 1913 | Jackson | Hanging | George Dedaskalous | Oswald West | |
| 90 | Mike Spanos | White | 22 | Male | October 31, 1913 | Jackson | Hanging | George Dedaskalous | Oswald West | |
| 91 | Oswald C. Hansel | White | 55 | Male | November 17, 1913 | Clatsop | Hanging | Frank Taylor | Oswald West | |
| 92 | Emmett Bancroft | Mixed | – | Male | November 5, 1920 | Umatilla | Hanging | Til Taylor | Ben W. Olcott | |
| 93 | John L. Rathie | White | 24 | Male | July 7, 1922 | Umatilla | Hanging | Til Taylor | Ben W. Olcott | |
| 94 | Elvie D. Kirby | White | 25 | Male | July 7, 1922 | Umatilla | Hanging | Til Taylor | Ben W. Olcott | |
| 95 | George Howard | White | 25 | Male | September 8, 1922 | Malheur | Hanging | George R. Sweeney | Ben W. Olcott | |
| 96 | Husted Walters | White | 23 | Male | March 9, 1923 | Multnomah | Hanging | Jerome Palmer | Walter M. Pierce | |
| 97 | Dan Casey | White | – | Male | August 24, 1923 | Multnomah | Hanging | J. H. Phillips | Walter M. Pierce | |
| 98 | George Parker | White | 32 | Male | January 4, 1924 | Linn | Hanging | W. J. Dunlap | Walter M. Pierce | |
| 99 | L. W. Peare | White | 70 | Male | May 22, 1925 | Coos | Hanging | 2 victims (Note: Mrs. Peare, James Culver) | Walter M. Pierce | |
| 100 | Arthur Covell | White | 47 | Male | May 22, 1925 | Coos | Hanging | Ebba Covell | Walter M. Pierce | |
| 101 | W. R. Lloyd | White | 27 | Male | November 30, 1925 | Polk | Hanging | Clinton F. Baun | Walter M. Pierce | |
| 102 | Archie Cody | White | 44 | Male | April 16, 1926 | Malheur | Hanging | Austin Goodman | Walter M. Pierce | |
| 103 | Albert Brownlee | White | 27 | Male | May 17, 1927 | Lane | Hanging | Eston Hooker | I. L. Patterson | |
| 104 | John Butchek | White | 45 | Male | June 10, 1927 | Multnomah | Hanging | Elizabeth Butchek | I. L. Patterson | |
| 105 | James Willos | White | – | Male | April 20, 1928 | Marion | Hanging | 3 victims (Note: J. M. Holman, J. L. Sweeney, and Lute Savage) | I. L. Patterson | |
| 106 | Ellsworth Kelley | White | – | Male | April 20, 1928 | Marion | Hanging | 3 victims | I. L. Patterson | |
| 107 | James E. Kingsley | White | 25 | Male | October 30, 1931 | Jackson | Hanging | Sam Prescott | Julius Meier | |
| 108 | Leroy Hershel McCarthy | White | 26 | Male | January 20, 1939 | Multnomah | Gas chamber | Floyd Fuelner | Charles A. Sprague | |
| 109 | Claude Edward Cline | White | 46 | Male | July 26, 1940 | Wheeler | Gas chamber | George Chetty | Charles A. Sprague | |
| 110 | James Harvey Thomas | White | 19 | Male | October 30, 1941 | Gilliam | Gas chamber | Robert Smith | Charles A. Sprague | |
| 111 | John Anthony Soto | Hispanic | 17 | Male | March 20, 1942 | Umatilla | Gas chamber | 3 victims (Note: Cora Tobin, Kenneth L. Gorsuch, Marvin Adams) | Charles A. Sprague | |
| 112 | William E. Wallace | White | 54 | Male | February 26, 1943 | Multnomah | Gas chamber | Benjamin H. Finkell | Earl Snell | |
| 113 | Harvey Cunningham | Black | 38 | Male | March 6, 1944 | Multnomah | Gas chamber | Richard Kerr | Earl Snell | |
| 114 | Richard Harry Layton | White | 36 | Male | December 8, 1944 | Polk | Gas chamber | Ruth Hildebrand | Earl Snell | |
| 115 | Robert E. Lee Folkes | Black | 24 | Male | January 5, 1945 | Linn | Gas chamber | Martha Virginia James | Earl Snell | |
| 116 | Walter Higgins | White | 35 | Male | January 15, 1945 | Clackamas | Gas chamber | Ralph Dahlen | Earl Snell | |
| 117 | Henry William Merten | White | 32 | Male | January 15, 1945 | Clackamas | Gas chamber | Ralph Dahlen | Earl Snell | |
| 118 | Andrew W. Dennis | White | 45 | Male | February 2, 1946 | Multnomah | Gas chamber | Anna Belle McNallen | Earl Snell | |
| 119 | Kenneth William Bailey | White | 27 | Male | September 13, 1946 | Malheur | Gas chamber | Theodore R. Chambers | Earl Snell | |
| 120 | Wardell H. Henderson | Black | 27 | Male | January 23, 1948 | Multnomah | Gas chamber | Walter Poole | John Hubert Hall | |
| 121 | Wayne Leroy Long | White | 26 | Male | August 8, 1952 | Clackamas | Gas chamber | Walter L. Rucker | Douglas McKay | |
| 122 | Frank Oliver Payne | White | 52 | Male | January 9, 1953 | Multnomah | Gas chamber | H. Nathan Butler | Paul L. Patterson | |
| 123 | Morris Leland | White | 22 | Male | January 9, 1953 | Multnomah | Gas chamber | Thelma Taylor | Paul L. Patterson | |
| 124 | Albert William Karnes | White | 24 | Male | January 30, 1953 | Marion | Gas chamber | Susan Litchfield | Paul L. Patterson | |
| 125 | Leroy Sanford McGahuey | White | 41 | Male | August 20, 1962 | Jackson | Gas chamber | 2 victims (Note: Loris and Rod Cameron Holt) | Mark Hatfield | |

== Demographics ==
Race
| White | 99 | 79% |
| Native American | 15 | 14% |
| Black | 5 | 4% |
| Asian | 3 | 2% |
| Mixed | 2 | 2% |
| Hispanic | 1 | 1% |
Age
| 17-19 | 4 | 3% |
| 20-29 | 32 | 26% |
| 30–39 | 11 | 9% |
| Unknown Age | 60 | 48% |
| 40–49 | 11 | 9% |
| 50-59 | 5 | 4% |
| 60-69 | 1 | 1% |
| 70-79 | 1 | 1% |
Gender
| Male | 128 | 100% |
| Female | 0 | 0% |
Date of execution
| 1850–1859 | 11 | 9% |
| 1860–1869 | 8 | 6% |
| 1870–1879 | 13 | 10% |
| 1880–1889 | 13 | 10% |
| 1890–1899 | 12 | 10% |
| 1900–1909 | 23 | 18% |
| 1910–1919 | 11 | 9% |
| 1920–1929 | 15 | 12% |
| 1930–1939 | 2 | 2% |
| 1940–1949 | 12 | 10% |
| 1950–1959 | 4 | 3% |
| 1960–1969 | 1 | 1% |
Method
| Hanging | 108 | 84% |
| Gas chamber | 18 | 14% |
| Firing squad | 2 | 2% |
Governor (Party)
| Joseph Lane (D) | 5 | 4% |
| John P. Gaines (W) | 4 | 3% |
| John Whiteaker (D) | 5 | 4% |
| A. C. Gibbs (R) | 5 | 4% |
| La Fayette Grover (D) | 5 | 4% |
| Stephen F. Chadwick (D) | 1 | 1% |
| W. W. Thayer (D) | 10 | 8% |
| Zenas Ferry Moody (R) | 4 | 3% |
| Sylvester Pennoyer (D) | 11 | 9% |
| William Paine Lord (R) | 6 | 5% |
| Theodore Thurston Geer (R) | 6 | 5% |
| George Earle Chamberlain (D) | 14 | 11% |
| Frank W. Benson (R) | 4 | 3% |
| Jay Bowerman (R) | 2 | 2% |
| Oswald West (D) | 9 | 7% |
| Ben W. Olcott (R) | 4 | 3% |
| Walter M. Pierce (D) | 7 | 3% |
| I. L. Patterson (R) | 4 | 3% |
| Julius Meier (I) | 1 | 1% |
| Charles A. Sprague (R) | 4 | 3% |
| Earl Snell (R) | 8 | 6% |
| John Hubert Hall (R) | 1 | 1% |
| Douglas McKay (R) | 1 | 1% |
| Paul L. Patterson (R) | 3 | 2% |
| Mark Hatfield (R) | 1 | 1% |

== See also ==
- Capital punishment in the United States
- Capital punishment in Oregon
- Lists of people executed in the United States
- List of people executed in Oregon
