= Dai Lixin =

Chinese chemist and academician

- 戴立信
- Born: 13 November 1924; Beijing, China
- Died: 13 May 2024 (aged 99); Shanghai, China
- Education: Zhejiang University
- Spouse: Dong Zhuxin
- Children: 1
- Scientific career
- Fields: Organic chemistry
- Workplaces: Shanghai Institute of Organic Chemistry, Chinese Academy of Sciences

Dai Lixin (Chinese: 戴立信; pinyin: Dài Lìxìn; 13 November 1924 – 13 May 2024) was a Chinese chemist, and an academic of the Chinese Academy of Sciences.

== Biography ==
Dai was born in Beijing on 13 November 1924 and was raised at his ancestral home is in Jurong, Jiangsu. In 1936, when he studied at Yuying Middle School, the Second Sino-Japanese War broke out, and his family fled to their grandfather's house in the Shanghai French Concession. After graduating from Sanyu High School, he was accepted to the Department of Chemistry at Hujiang University in 1942. A year later, he transferred to the Department of Chemistry at Zhejiang University.

After graduating from university in 1947, Dai taught at Shanghai Zhonghua Vocational School for a short time. In 1948, he was introduced by his classmates to work in the laboratory of the 3rd Iron and Steel Plant located in Pudong. He joined the Chinese Communist Party (CCP) in 1949.

After the establishment of the Communist State in 1949, Dai successively worked at Shanghai Iron and Steel Company and East China Mining and Metallurgy Bureau. In 1953, he was transferred to the Shanghai Institute of Organic Chemistry, Chinese Academy of Sciences, and in 1958, he was engaged in scientific and technological organization related to organic chemistry in the "Two Bombs, One Satellite" project. In 1962, he independently carried out extensive work on borohydride reactions and chemical research on carboranes. During the ten-year Cultural Revolution, he was forced to perform hard labor instead of doing research in the laboratory. He was a victim of political persecution that affected other academics at the time. In 1978, he returned to his research position and served as an assistant to Wang You, director of the Shanghai Institute of Organic Chemistry at that time. He was promoted to doctoral supervisor in June 1986. In the 1990s, he and academician Huang Liang jointly led the major project of the Ninth Five Year Plan - "Chemical and Biological Research of Chiral Drugs".

On 13 May 2024, Dai died in Shanghai, at the age of 99.

== Family ==
Dai married Dong Zhuxin (董竹心) and had a daughter Dai Jing (戴敬).

== Honours and awards ==
- 1993 - Member of the Chinese Academy of Sciences (CAS)
- 2002 - Science and Technology Progress Award of the Ho Leung Ho Lee Foundation
- 2013 - State Natural Science Award (Second Class) for asymmetric catalysis based on chiral phosphine nitrogen ligands.
- 2018 - Lifetime Achievement Award of the Chinese Chemical Society
