= Michael Torrence =

American serial killer

- Born: Michael Rian Torrence; April 15, 1961; Pine Ridge, South Carolina, U.S.
- Died: September 6, 1996 (aged 35); Broad River Correctional Institution, South Carolina, U.S.
- Status: Executed by lethal injection
- Convictions: Murder (3 counts); Armed robbery Burglary
- Penalty: Death

Details
- Victims: 3
- Span of crimes: February 11 – March 28, 1987
- Country: United States
- State: South Carolina
- Date apprehended: April 6, 1987

Michael Rian Torrence (April 15, 1961 – September 6, 1996) was an American serial killer responsible for the murders of three people in South Carolina from February to March 1987, two of which were committed with the help of his brother and his brother's wife, Donna. Sentenced to death for one murder and two life terms, Torrence successfully volunteered for his execution, dropping all appeals against the wishes of his public defender, and was executed in 1996.

== Murders and arrest ==
In early 1987, 20-year-old Donna Michele Webb Torrence, a topless dancer who worked at a strip club called "The Carriage House" near Fort Jackson, complained to her husband, 28-year-old Thomas John Torrence, that two patrons had supposedly taunted her. In order to get back at them, Torrence recruited his younger brother, Michael, and the trio decided to rob them. They eventually tracked the two men, 31-year-old Charles Alan Bush and 41-year-old Dennis Lollis, both of whom were engineers at the M. Lowenstein Corporation textile mill in Olympia, to their shared room at the Red Roof Inn in Cayce.

On February 11, Donna visited the Red Roof Inn, where she knocked on the victims’ door and told Bush her car had broken down and persuaded him to give her a ride to her residence. Bush then drove her to her family house in Pine Ridge. She invited him to come inside, but as he entered the house Michael, who was hiding behind the door, slammed it shut behind the victim. Thomas and Michael then beat Bush with a tire thumper and choked him with a dog chain. The pair then stole the key to the motel room and drove to the Red Carpet Inn, where they snuck in and stabbed the sleeping Lollis to death. After stealing all of the money and valuables they could find, the brothers left. On the following day, Lollis' body was discovered, with an autopsy determining that he had been stabbed over 20 times.

Soon after the murders, the Torrences left Pine Ridge and resettled in Charleston. On March 28, Michael picked up a 20-year-old prostitute, Cynthia M. Williams, but for reasons unknown, the pair got into an argument. Angered, he grabbed a shotgun and shot her in the chest, killing Williams immediately. He then drove to the I-526 and dumped her body there, where it was soon discovered by two motorists. As he was last seen in her company, Michael was considered the prime suspect by police, who kept him under surveillance until they gathered enough evidence to secure an arrest. On April 6, the two brothers were arrested at their Charleston home and brought in for interrogation. During questioning, they both admitted responsibility for the Bush-Lollis murders, later indicating where they had buried Bush's body.

== Trial, volunteering and execution ==
After their arrest, the Torrences were held without bond and in separate jails: Donna and Thomas were held in Lexington County, while Michael was held in Charleston County. Due to the severity of their crimes - especially the Bush-Lollis murders - prosecutors in both counties considered seeking the death penalty against all three defendants. By the end of the trial, however, only Michael would be sentenced to death on one count for Lollis' murder, receiving life terms for the two other murders. His brother also received a life term, while Donna accepted a plea deal and was given a lesser sentence in exchange for testifying against them.

The sentence was overturned by the South Carolina Supreme Court just a year later, and Torrence was ordered to undergo a new trial in 1994, where he was again found guilty and resentenced to death by jury verdict. Soon after, Torrence began petitioning the courts to allow him to drop all of his pending appeals, claiming that he preferred to be executed rather than spend the rest of his life in prison. Due to this, he frequently clashed with his court-appointed lawyer Joe Savitz, who barred him from doing interviews with the press. Savitz expressed his belief that his client was mentally unstable, as he had supposedly claimed to have killed a family in Guatemala in 1979 while working as a mercenary. Torrence's father said this could not be true, as Michael had been imprisoned in North Carolina at the time. Prosecutor Donald Myers supported Torrence's efforts, arguing that in contrast to what his attorney claimed, his racial prejudices and other hateful beliefs did not make him irrational, and that he was well-aware of what he had done.

Nevertheless, Torrence continued to push for his appeals to be dropped, stating in multiple interviews that while he acknowledged the gravity of his actions, he did not feel any remorse for the victims. He was eventually granted his request, and was scheduled for execution on September 6, 1996. After the announcement, Dennis Lollis' widow, Shelby, announced in a media interview that she would attend his execution, as she considered it a debt she owed to her late husband. On the aforementioned date, Torrence was executed via lethal injection at the Broad River Correctional Institution in Columbia, amidst fears Hurricane Fran might strike the state. Before his execution, Torrence's lawyer read a handwritten statement in which he claimed that he now "acknowledges and understands the effects" of his crimes, that he wished this would bring closure to the victims' families and that he had accepted God as his savior. His request for a last meal (steak, shrimp and lobster prepared by a local Japanese restaurant) was rejected, and the prison cafeteria instead gave him shrimp with cocktail sauce and strawberry shortcake. Torrence was executed on the same day as Douglas Franklin Wright, another serial killer who was executed in Oregon.

== See also ==
- Capital punishment in South Carolina
- List of people executed by lethal injection
- List of people executed in South Carolina
- List of people executed in the United States in 1996
- List of serial killers in the United States
- Volunteer (capital punishment)

Executions carried out in South Carolina
Preceded by Fred Kornahrens III July 19, 1996	Michael Torrence; September 6, 1996	Succeeded by Larry Gene Bell October 4, 1996
Executions carried out in the United States
Preceded by Luis Mata – Arizona August 22, 1996	Michael Torrence – South Carolina; September 6, 1996	Succeeded by Douglas Franklin Wright – Oregon September 6, 1996
