= Cesar Barone =

American serial killer (1960–2009)

- c. 1993 mugshot
- Born: Adolph James Rode Jr. December 4, 1960; Lauderdale Lakes, Florida, U.S.
- Died: December 24, 2009 (aged 49); Oregon State Penitentiary, Salem, Oregon, U.S.
- Other name: "Jimmy"
- Status: Died before execution
- Convictions: Aggravated murder; Burglary; Rape
- Penalty: Death (murders); 40 years imprisonment (burglary/rape charges)

Details
- Victims: 5–7+ (4 convictions)
- Span of crimes: 1991 – 1993 (possibly 1979)
- Country: United States
- States: Oregon, possibly Florida
- Date apprehended: 1993

Cesar Francesco Barone (born Adolph James Rode Jr.; December 4, 1960 – December 24, 2009) was an American serial killer and rapist who was sentenced to death in 1995 for assaulting and killing four women in the Portland metropolitan area area between 1991 and 1993. He was posthumously linked to one further murder and is a suspect in two others dating back to 1979, including at least one in Florida.

Barone remained on death row until his natural death in 2009, steadfastly refusing to admit guilt in any other potential crimes.

== Early life and criminal activity ==
Adolph James "Jimmy" Rode Jr. was born in Lauderdale Lakes, Florida, on December 4, 1960, but was raised in Fort Lauderdale. He had an older brother and a sister. When he was four, his mother left the household to live with another man; his parents divorced the following year, and Rode was raised by his father, Adolph Sr., and his new wife, Stella Hall. While growing up, Rode often skipped school to smoke marijuana, steal coins from neighboring homes, and he spent most of his time tending to animals such as snakes and alligators. He would later claim that once he nursed a monkey back to health, he locked it in a closet with some stray cats just so the monkey could tear the cats apart for his amusement.

Beginning in his teenage years, Rode developed a drinking problem and was often seen carrying cans of beer around with him. At the age of fifteen, he entered the home of Alice Stock, a neighbor in her seventies, threatening her with a knife and ordering her to undress: she refused, and Rode left the scene. Despite this, his first arrest came two years later on December 15, 1977, when he was caught for several burglaries. While he was initially supposed to serve three years in prison, Rode was released early in December 1979—at around this time, his older brother died in a car accident. At around this period, the now-73-year-old Stock was raped and murdered at her home in Fort Lauderdale – Rode was considered a suspect due to his previous attack on the elderly woman, but was not charged at the time.

Three months later, Rode was arrested yet again for several burglaries and for possessing burglary tools, but was bailed out by his mother for $200. In early 1980, Rode broke into the home of his stepmother and attempted to rape and strangle her to death, but stopped once she started crying out.

While awaiting trial for the burglary charges, Rode was accused of severely beating up his 70-year-old grandmother, Mattie Marino. According to Marino's account, on April 12, 1980, Rode visited her to borrow a spool of white thread. At first, he acted normally and kissed her on the cheek, but then he supposedly started acting out. When she attempted to calm him down, he started choking and beating her with a rolling pin, smiling throughout the entire ordeal. After he was done, Rode stole $10 and fled the apartment.

Rode was eventually put on trial for the attempted murder, where Marino reiterated her belief that he was responsible, but surmised that "something in [him] had snapped". Despite her assertions that her grandson was the assailant, Rode was eventually acquitted due to lack of evidence, as his defense attorney Bruce Lincoln convinced the jury that the true culprit might have been an unrelated burglar and emphasizing on the idea that it was very unlikely a blood relative would carry out such a vicious attack against their own grandmother. Shortly after his acquittal, Rode was convicted of the burglary charges and imprisoned at the Baker Correctional Institution.

On July 9, 1982, Rode escaped from prison, but was recaptured a day later and had an extra year added to his sentence. He was then transferred to the Cross City Correctional Institution, where he was soon cited for battery against a law enforcement officer. He was then moved yet again to the Florida State Prison, where he shared a cell with Ted Bundy, a fact which he often boasted about to other prisoners. Decades later, an investigator who would help investigate Rode's later crimes suspected that the young criminal might have asked Bundy for advice on how to avoid getting caught, and even suggested that Bundy provided Rode with a singles newspaper so he could date women, through which he later met and married his wife, Kathi Scarbrough.

== Later criminal activity ==
=== Army service ===
After his release in 1987, Rode started going by the name "Cesar Francesco Barone" – it is unclear if he legally changed his name or this was just an alias. Barone decided on this name because he was enamored with Italian gangsters. He then moved to the Northwestern United States, where, in late 1988, he enlisted in the United States Army and was transferred for basic training in Fort Benning, Georgia. He convinced his recruiters that he had studied for two years at Indian River State College, allowing him to be admitted in this way.

When he completed basic training, Barone was moved to Fort Lewis, Washington on June 22, 1989, where he was a member of the 75th Ranger Regiment's B Company 2nd Battalion. In December of that year, the Battalion was dispatched to Panama to take part in the overthrowing of the Noriega government.

=== Move to Oregon ===
Following his discharge from the Army, Barone moved to Hillsboro, Oregon. His primary means of income was his occasional work as a cabinetmaker, as well as a brief stint as a nursing assistant at a nursing home in Forest Grove.

In 1992, Barone's wife Kathi Scarbrough divorced him, citing irreconcilable differences between them. By then, he had already started killing and sexually assaulting local women.

== Murders ==
From 1991 to 1993, Cesar Barone killed at least four women around Hillsboro and Portland, as well as sexually assaulting another three during that same period without killing them. It is suspected that he had more victims.

His first known victim was 61-year-old Margaret Helen Schmidt. Barone broke into her home on 375 Southeast Walnut Street in April 1991 and strangled her to death, then stole some money and left the premises. Schmidt's body was discovered by a social worker on April 19, with robbery being ruled as the likely motive for the murder at the time. In an attempt to gather tips about the case, the Hillsboro CrimeStoppers branch offered a reward of $1,000 for any information that could lead to the arrest of her killer.

On October 9, 1992, Barone, possibly with an accomplice, was driving on Cornell Road in Hillsboro when he spotted a green Volkswagen Beetle driven by 41-year-old Martha Browning Bryant, a midwife who was returning home from work. He pulled up behind her car and opened fire, striking her in the left shoulder and forcing Bryant onto the sidewalk. Barone then got out of his car, forcibly dragged her into his and then drove for approximately a third of a mile before he shot her in the head. Barone then left her body in the middle of the road on Northeast 231st Avenue, where she was discovered by a passing motorist. An ambulance was called in and Bryant was rushed via a Life Flight helicopter to a hospital in Portland, where she was pronounced dead at 6:50 AM.

The seemingly random killing caused shock to the local community, leading to approximately 150 tips being submitted just days after Bryant's murder. Initially, the police noted that they were searching for two suspects who were possibly driving a 1968 Oldsmobile 442 or a Chevrolet Chevelle that was damaged from ramming Bryant's car. Similarly to Schmidt before her, the local CrimeStoppers branch raised $1,015 as a reward for any information leading to an arrest, while a fund was also started in Bryant's name to provide scholarships for midwifery students.

On December 30, 1992, Barone and 24-year-old Leonard Benjamin Darcell II, an acquaintance from his days at the Forest Grove nursing home, picked up 23-year-old Chantee Elise Woodman from the Satyricon, a nightclub in downtown Portland. The two men then held her hostage while Barone raped her. However, as she resisted fiercely, he instead shot her in the head, after which he and Darcell abandoned the body along the Sunset Highway. Darcell fled to Seattle, Washington after this murder, where he soon surrendered for an unrelated parole violation and was incarcerated.

On January 7, 1993, Barone broke into the Cornelius apartment of 51-year-old Betty Lou Williams. He then proceeded to sexually assault her, with the stress from the attack being so intense that Williams suffered a heart attack and died during the assault.

== Arrest and possible additional victims ==
Barone was arrested on February 27, 1993, for the murder of Martha Bryant. Not long after his arrest, local authorities started investigating him for possible involvement in other violent crimes in places he was known to reside, which included the killings of Schmidt, Woodman, and Williams.

As he was investigated for these crimes, Barone's ex-wife Kathi demanded that authorities exhume the remains of her mother, 61-year-old Joyce Marie Scarbrough, who was found dead inside her home in Hillsboro on February 4. Initially, the cause of death was considered undetermined and no autopsy was conducted, but after Barone's arrest, authorities agreed to reinvestigate the case. It was suspected that Barone stole $3,000 from Scarbrough's bank account shortly before her death, which he then spent in expensive gifts for a girlfriend. In May 1993, the Washington County medical examiner, Eugene Jacobus, ruled that the cause of death was inconclusive, stating that there were no apparent signs of violence on Scarbrough's body.

Aside from Scarbrough, Barone was investigated for other then-unsolved murders in Oregon's Washington County, including that of 83-year-old Elizabeth Burtis Wasson, who was found murdered at her apartment in Hillsboro on September 23, 1992. In February 2026, law enforcement connected him to the Wasson killing via DNA evidence. He was additionally investigated for other crimes in Washington and his native state of Florida.

== Trials ==
=== Bryant trial ===
At first, Barone was only charged with the murders of Bryant, Woodman, and Williams, in addition to various rape, theft, and burglary charges. Darcell was charged alongside him as an accomplice in the Woodman murder, and was held without bail.

In December 1993, Barone's trial was delayed so prosecutors could gather additional evidence against him. He was then brought in to testify at Leonard Darcell's trial, but refused to take the stand when asked. In the end, Darcell was convicted of felony kidnapping and sentenced to 20 years imprisonment.

That following month, Florida authorities decided to charge him with Stock's murder based on the striking similarities between that case and his later crimes, in addition to claims that he had boasted about the murder to his cellmates. In April of that year, after being convicted and sentenced to 40 years imprisonment for the burglary and rape charges, Barone was indicted for the Schmidt murder after a shoe print from a Reebok sneaker he owned was matched to a print left by Schmidt's killer inside her apartment.

It was eventually ruled that Barone would be have multiple trials, with the first being in the Bryant case. Jury selection began in October 1994, with the prosecutors announcing that they would seek the death penalty against him if he was convicted. During the proceedings, it was confirmed that blood found in Barone's car was conclusively identified as belonging to Bryant after a DNA test. For his role, Barone's attorney attempted to cast doubt on the testimony from Barone's cellmates, pointing out several errors they had made that did not line up with the police reports.

In January 1995, a jury of seven women and five men took only 90 minutes to convict Barone on four counts of aggravated murder in the Bryant case. Following this, prosecutors announced that they would introduce his previous criminal history as evidence why he should be sentenced to death, while Barone's lawyers gathered sympathetic witnesses and mental health experts to testify about his harsh life. On January 31, 1995, Barone was officially sentenced to death for the Bryant murder.

=== Joint murder trial ===
Following the conclusion of the Bryant trial, Barone was scheduled to be tried for the remaining three homicides – the first convict to do so since the Legislature passed a law allowing for the consolidation of murder cases back in 1991. In November 1995, he was convicted on all counts, and on December 6, he was given two additional death sentences.

Barone was noted for his rude and at times bizarre behavior during the trial – one newspaper, The Oregonian, noted that he made outlandish claims such as being a descendant of Italian nobility and that the all-white jury was racially prejudiced against him because he supposedly had black ancestors. He also attempted to ask for help in convincing one of the women he sexually abused not to testify because she "doesn't know how to stop talking", and put a small sign on the defense table reading "Kangaroo Court".

== Imprisonment and death ==
In January 1996, Barone was indicted for the murder of Alice Stock in Florida. While he claimed that he had nothing to do with it and was looking forward to an acquittal, most people, including his relatives, stated in interviews to the media that they believed he was guilty. Initially, he opted to act as his own attorney, but later changed his mind and sought legal counsel. However, in 2000, the charges in this case were dropped due to the lack of robust evidence and Barone's existing death sentences in Oregon.

In December 1998, in the midst of a protest by anti-death penalty activists, the Oregon Supreme Court denied an appeal by Barone concerning the Bryant murder. In July 1999, the Oregon Supreme Court also upheld his other two death sentences.

In January 2000, Barone and three other death row inmates were featured in a controversial anti-death penalty ad by Italian fashion brand Benetton Group. The ad was heavily criticized by prosecutors and the family members of the inmates' victims, who claimed that it glorified their loved ones' murderers. Barone himself seemingly enjoyed the ad, but complained about the picture they used for him.

By late 2009, Barone was diagnosed with a tumor on his heart, with the expectation that he would soon succumb to it. After learning of this, two of the lead detectives investigating unsolved crimes in which Barone was a suspect attempted to talk with him in hopes he might reveal information about other victims, but Barone steadfastly refused and seemed unconcerned with his inevitable death. On December 24, 2009, Barone died from heart cancer in the medical wing of the Oregon State Penitentiary at age 49.

== List of known victims ==
=== Confirmed victims ===
Date	Name	Age	Place
April 1991	Margaret Helen Schmidt	62	Hillsboro, Oregon
September 23, 1992	Elizabeth Burtis Wasson	82	Hillsboro, Oregon
October 9, 1992	Martha Browning Bryant	41	Hillsboro, Oregon
December 30, 1992	Chantee Alyce Woodman (Note: Also referred to by the name Dantee Elise Oshita.)	23	Hillsboro, Oregon
January 7, 1993	Betty Lou Williams	51	Cornelius, Oregon

=== Suspected victims ===
Date	Name	Age	Place
December 1979	Alice Stock	73	Fort Lauderdale, Florida
February 4, 1993	Joyce Marie Scarbrough	61	Hillsboro, Oregon

== See also ==
- Capital punishment in Oregon
- List of serial killers in the United States

== Books ==
- Don Lasseter, Dead of Night : The True Story of a Serial Killer, Dutton / Signet, 1999. ISBN 0451407032
- Michael Newton, The Encyclopedia of Serial Killers, Infobase Publishing, 2006, p. 395. ISBN 0816069875
- Jack Levin, Serial Killers and Sadistic Murderers : Up Close and Personal, Prometheus Books, 2008, p. 54. ISBN 1591025761
