= Douglas Franklin Wright =

American serial killer

- Born: March 25, 1940; Spirit Lake, Iowa, U.S.
- Died: September 6, 1996 (aged 56); Oregon State Penitentiary, Oregon, U.S.
- Status: Executed by lethal injection
- Convictions: Murder (2 counts); Aggravated murder (3 counts)
- Penalty: Death (October 11, 1993)

Details
- Victims: 7+ (5 convicted)
- Span of crimes: 1969–1991
- Country: United States
- States: Oregon, possibly others

Douglas Franklin Wright (March 25, 1940 – September 6, 1996) was an American serial killer who murdered at least seven people in Oregon between 1969 and 1991. He was sentenced to death for three of these murders and was executed in 1996 at the Oregon State Penitentiary, becoming the first person to be executed in Oregon since 1962. He was also the first person executed in Oregon by lethal injection.

== Early life ==
Wright was born on March 25, 1940, in Spirit Lake, Iowa. His father was an alcoholic and his mother neglected him. According to psychological reports, Wright endured repeated physical and sexual abuse as a child. He became a high school dropout and was kicked out of the Marines for sexually assaulting a 5-year-old boy in California. Wright admitted to a probation officer that he had sexually assaulted more than 70 young boys. In the early 1960s, Wright was arrested for multiple burglaries and assaults and was sentenced to eight years in prison.

== Murders ==
On September 4, 1969, Wright broke into the home of 71-year-old Margaret Rosenberry in Portland, Oregon. He was a friend of her family and was known to them. Upon entering the home, Wright murdered Rosenberry and her granddaughter, 27-year-old Gail Snelling. Armed with a pistol, he killed Snelling via two fatal gunshot wounds to the head and fatally shot Rosenberry three times. He then abducted Snelling's 5-year-old son, taking him to several motels in the area where he sexually assaulted him. Wright eventually let the boy go. Police launched a manhunt for Wright, who evaded them for over a month. He was ultimately captured after shooting a man at a billiards hall in Banks. Wright was found guilty of the murders of Rosenberry and Snelling and was sentenced to 35 years in prison. When asked why he killed them, Wright said he had always wanted a son of his own.

Wright was considered a model prisoner and was paroled in 1982. However, upon his release, he committed several armed robberies, threatening to kill anyone who got in his way. On May 23, 1984, Wright abducted 10-year-old Luke Tredway from Portland. He grabbed Tredway off the streets as he walked home from a friend's house. He then drove Tredway back to his apartment and molested him for the next 36 hours. He murdered Tredway at dawn on May 25, fatally shooting him six times. Wright then disposed of the body, and the case went unsolved for over 12 years. In 1984, Wright was arrested for the armed robberies and was sentenced to 30 years in prison. In June 1991, he was released.

In October 1991, Wright advertised work to homeless men in Portland, offering them ten dollars an hour to clear brush at a youth camp. On October 20, two homeless men, 26-year-old Randy Scott Henry and 31-year-old Anthony Shawn "Tony" Nelson, accepted Wright's offer for work. Wright drove them out of Portland to a remote area on the Warm Springs Indian Reservation and bought them food. He then drove to the desert and offered them alcohol. As the men drank the alcohol, Wright fatally shot Nelson in the head with a pistol. Henry jumped out of the car and escaped while Wright fired at him. Henry managed to get to the highway and returned to Portland, where he alerted the police. Henry and another witness led the police straight to Wright, and he was apprehended.

It was then learned that Wright had killed three more people in a similar fashion to Nelson. The victims were identified as 27-year-old Anthony Barker, 23-year-old William Marks, and 37-year-old William Davis, all murdered in October 1991. All three victims were homeless men whom Wright had lured to a remote area of Wasco County on the Warm Springs Indian Reservation with a false promise of work. He then murdered each of them by fatally shooting them in the head with a pistol. He was later convicted in Wasco County of these murders.

== Victims ==
In total, Wright was convicted of five murders but was linked to seven. He also hinted at additional killings in other states prior to his execution, but he was only ever confirmed to have killed seven people.

=== Known murder victims ===
| No. | Date of death | Name | Age | Sentence | Ref. |
|---|---|---|---|---|---|
| 1 | September 4, 1969 | Margaret Rosenberry | 71 | 35 years | |
| 2 | September 4, 1969 | Gail Snelling | 27 | 35 years | |
| 3 | May 25, 1984 | Luke Tredway | 10 | Not convicted | |
| 4 | October 1991 | Anthony Arthur Barker | 27 | Death | |
| 5 | October 1991 | William Clement Marks | 23 | Death | |
| 6 | October 1991 | William Ray Davis | 37 | Death | |
| 7 | October 20, 1991 | Anthony Shawn "Tony" Nelson | 31 | Not convicted | |

== Trial and revelation ==
Wright was convicted of the murders of Barker, Marks, and Davis. He was also indicted in the murder of Nelson in a federal court. Because Nelson was a Makah Indian, Wright was never officially charged with his murder, as he would have to be tried in a federal court based on the law. If Wright had not quit his appeals process, he would have been tried before a federal court in the Nelson case because killing a Native American on an Indian reservation is a federal crime, under the Major Crimes Act.

On June 25, 1993, Wright was convicted of aggravated murder for the three killings. On October 11, 1993, he was sentenced to death for the murders of Barker, Marks, and Davis. After being sentenced, Wright waived his appeals and asked to be executed, speeding up his execution.

Shortly before his execution Wright sent a letter to The Oregonian in which he confessed to the abduction, molestation, and murder of Luke Tredway back in 1984, which was still unsolved by 1996. Wright elaborated: "On the morning of September 6 I'm going to be gone, and as far as I'm concerned I'm gone forever. I'm leaving a very violent past and I'm a very evil person; I've done nothing but bad all my life, and I wanted to do one good thing before I left. I want to bring light to the death of Luke Tredway because it affected me very deeply." He also invited Tredway's family to attend his execution if it would bring them closure, but they declined.

== Execution ==
Wright was executed by lethal injection on September 6, 1996. It was the first execution in Oregon in thirty-four years and the state's first post-Gregg execution. Wright remains the first of only two people to be executed in Oregon since the resumption of the death penalty. The other was convicted murderer Harry Charles Moore in 1997. Both waived their appeals and asked that the execution be carried out.

== See also ==
- List of homicides in Oregon
- List of people executed in Oregon
- List of people executed in the United States in 1996
- List of serial killers in the United States

Executions carried out in Oregon
| Preceded by Leroy McGahuey August 20, 1962 | Douglas Franklin Wright; September 6, 1996 | Succeeded by Harry Charles Moore May 16, 1997 |
Executions carried out in the United States
| Preceded by Michael Torrence – South Carolina September 6, 1996 | Douglas Franklin Wright – Oregon; September 6, 1996 | Succeeded by Raymond Lee Stewart – Illinois September 18, 1996 |
