= Damião de Bozzano =

Venerable Damião de Bozzano OFMCap
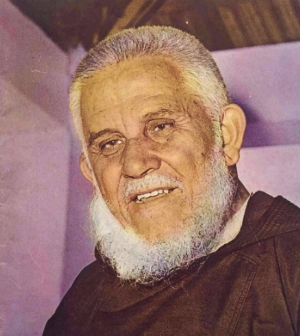
- Born: Pio Giannotti; 5 November 1898; Bozzano, Massarosa, Lucca, Kingdom of Italy
- Died: 31 May 1997 (aged 98); Royal Portuguese Hospital, Recife, Pernambuco, Brazil
- Resting place: Convent St. Félix Cantalice, Pina, Recife, Brazil

Damião de Bozzano OFMCap, born as Pio Giannotti (5 November 1898 – 31 May 1997), was an Italian religious priest of the Order of Friars Minor Capuchin who served as a missionary in Brazil for over six decades. Giannotti entered the order when he was twelve to do his ecclesial studies and religious formation of which he spent some of that time in Rome. He worked as a teacher from 1928 until 1931 when he was sent to the missions in Brazil. He would remain there for the rest of his life and would go travelling often to northern Brazilian cities where he would celebrate Mass and evangelize while hearing confessions on a frequent basis.

Towards the end of his life he was hospitalized on nineteen separate occasions due to a series of health issues he began facing. He suffered from a spinal deformation that left him stooped and suffered from speech and breathing difficulties. His health declined into his nineties and he died from a stroke while recovering in hospital for breathing difficulties.

The beatification process for the late friar had been called for after he died since the people in Recife and the northern cities revered Giannotti as a saint. The Olinda e Recife archdiocese launched the beatification cause in mid-2003 after its formal introduction in 2002 and he became titled as a Servant of God. The cause culminated on 6 April 2019 after Pope Francis acknowledged his heroic virtue and named him as Venerable.

== Life ==
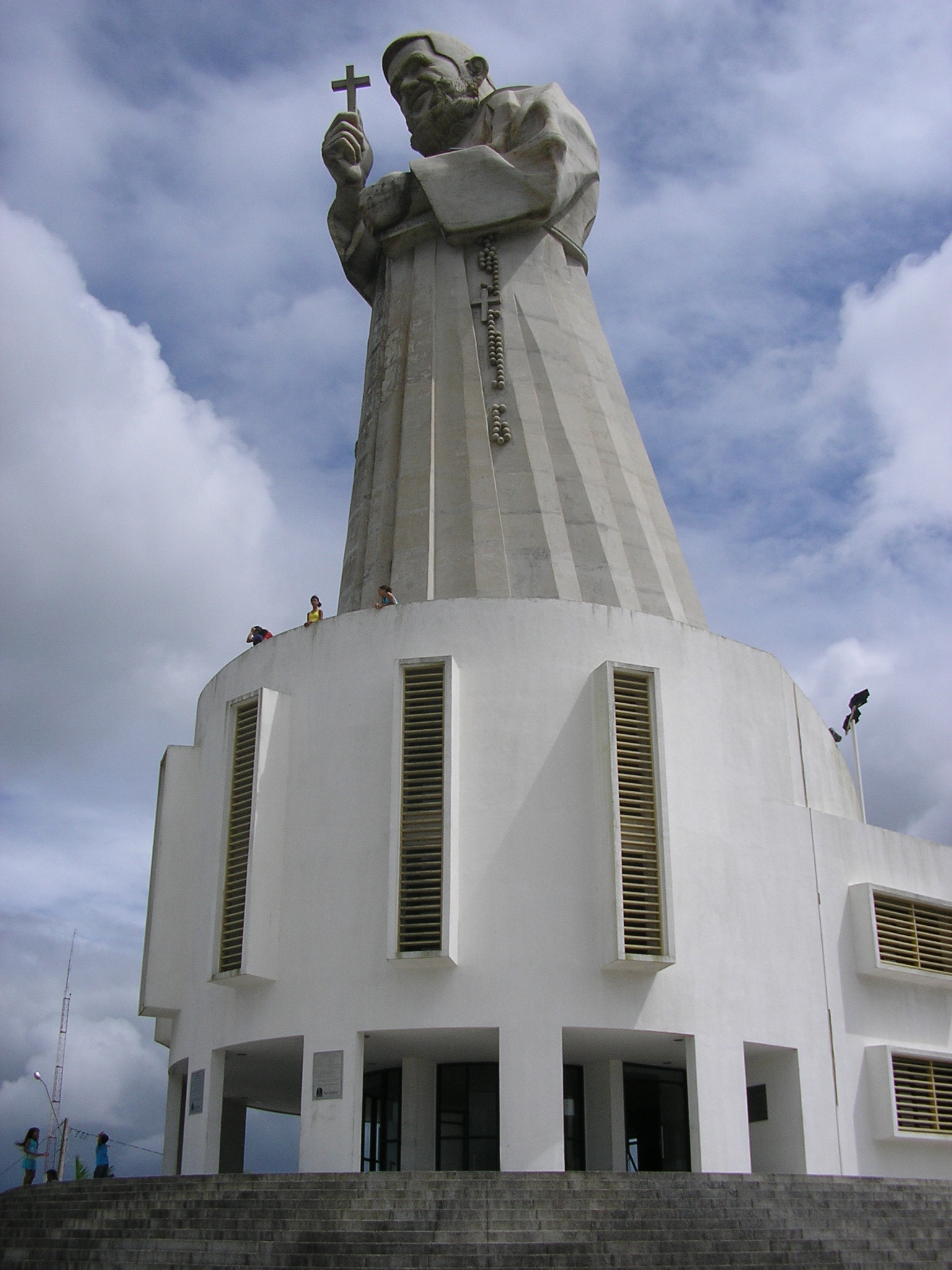
The memorial in his honor in Guarabira that was inaugurated in 2004.

Pio Giannotti was born in Bozzano on 5 November 1898 as the second of five children born to the pious peasants Felice and Maria. His older brother Guglielmo became a priest and spiritual director while his sister Pia joined the Sisters of Saint Zita as a professed religious. He was baptized on 6 November in the Chiesa di Santi Caterina e Prospero and he later received his confirmation on 15 June 1908 from Cardinal Benedetto Lorenzelli in the Lucca Cathedral.

His First Communion when he was ten had a profound effect on him and upon returning home he had disappeared before he was found in the attic in silence before the crucifix. It was from this point onwards that he felt a profound call to the religious life and so in 1911 when he was twelve he joined the Order of Friars Minor Capuchin at their convent in Camigliano where he began his initial ecclesial education; he made a formal request to join the order in May 1914. He was vested in the religious habit on 11 July 1914 in the Villa Basilica convent in Lucca and made his initial vows on 11 July 1915 upon the conclusion of his novitiate period. He did his philosophical studies which were interrupted during World War I when he was conscripted. It was after that he was discharged that he was sent to continue his education at the Pontifical Gregorian University in Rome where he did his dogmatics and canon law studies. On 29 September 1921 he received permission to go to the International College of San Lorenzo da Brindisi in Rome where he would live while finishing his education in Rome at the Gregorian. Giannotti made his solemn profession into the order on 30 October 1921 and the religious name he assumed was "Damiano da Bozzano". He received his ordination to the priesthood in the Chiesa di San Lorenzo da Brindisi on 25 August 1923 from Cardinal Basilio Pompili. (Note: Other sources suggest that Giannotti was ordained on 5 July 1923 rather than on 25 August 1923 which most sources affirm. All sources, however, refer to Giannotti's ordination as having been held in Rome.)

Giannotti served as a vice-novice master in the Villa Basilica convent from 10 July 1925 until the Provincial Chapter of 1928 was held when he was appointed to teach seminarians in Massa. (Note: Some sources suggest he served as novice master while some Italian sources refer to Giannotti as having served as the vice-master of novices.) In 1930 the superior of the Brazilian missions Felice da Olivola asked for new missionaries for the northern region. In 1931 he was sent to the missions in Brazil at Pernambuco and would remain in Brazil until his death just over six decades later. He left with Ignazio da Carrara and Benedetto da Terrinca and set sail from Genoa on 28 May 1931 before arriving at the port of Recife on 17 June; upon arrival he settled in the Nossa Senhora da Penha convent in Recife's center. He lived in Maceió in Alagoas during World War II until 1945. Giannotti studied Portuguese in order to be able to celebrate Mass and communicate with the people and travelled to places such as Rio Grande do Norte and Paraíba amongst others. It was while he travelled that he preached about the realities of Heaven and Hell and spoke also about sin and forgiveness. He was on the move often and ministered to all people from all walks of live and his mission of evangelization reached the northern areas of Brazil. Giannotti devoted himself to hearing confessions wherever he travelled after celebrating Mass and made preaching and evangelization the focus of his mission. He also delivered food and other provisions to the poor and to the sick. Giannotti was also a doctrinal conservative who was sometimes at odds with left-wing priests who supported liberation theology.

His health took a sharp decline into his nineties. It became more and more common during that time for people to see him for guidance rather than having him go out to see them. He suffered from a spinal deformation that left him bent and stooped to the point that it often caused speech and breathing difficulties. He also began suffering from erysipelas due to poor blood circulation and in 1990 suffered a pulmonary embolism that handicapped his walking. He was hospitalized on nineteen separate occasions as he grew older due to a series of health complications.

Giannotti died on 31 May 1997 from a stroke after being in a coma for nineteen days in the Royal Portuguese Hospital in Recife. He was admitted to hospital on 6 May 1997 for severe respiratory failure and was comatose before spending four days in the recovery ward. The President Fernando Henrique Cardoso proclaimed a three-day period of mourning for Giannotti's death. His remains were embalmed and lay in state for three days in the Basilica Nossa Senhora de Penha. The Archbishop of Olinda e Recife José Cardoso Sobrinho presided over his funeral Mass was conducted in the Estádio do Arruda in Recife with twelve bishops and 138 priests present for the funeral; his coffin had to be helicoptered to the burial site as people clogged the streets, making ground travel impossible. His remains were interred in the Nostra Signora delle Grazie chapel in Pina near Recife. Cardinal Paulo Evaristo Arns praised Giannotti after the friar's death and called him one of the greatest missionaries in Brazilian history; the cardinal said that he had delivered "firm teaching" that exhorted others to observe "good moral conduct". In 2004 came the inauguration of a memorial erected in his honor in Guarabira in Paraíba that had been in construction since 2000.

== Beatification process ==
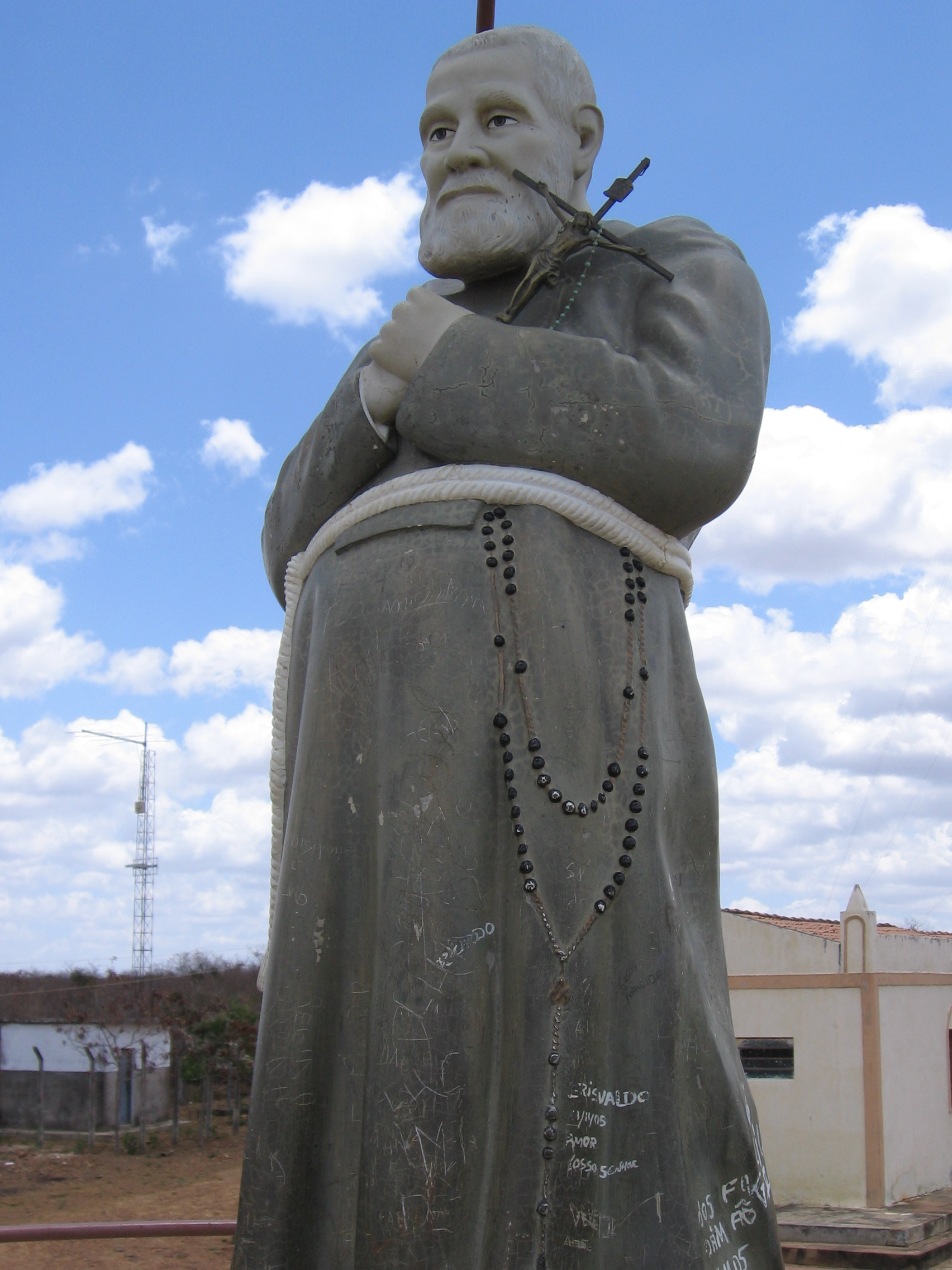
Statue in Araripe in Ceará.

The beatification process opened on 6 July 2002 after the Congregation for the Causes of Saints issued the official "nihil obstat" (no objections to the cause) edict and titled him as a Servant of God; the issuing of the edict was a declaration that no obstacles existed that would otherwise impede the cause's activation. The Olinda e Recife archdiocese launched the official diocesan investigation into Giannotti's life and reputation for holiness on 31 May 2003 and closed it a decade later on 24 May 2012; a smaller investigation was opened in the Lucca archdiocese in 2006 for additional evidence to be collected. The C.C.S. received the boxes of documentation collected during that timeframe and validated the diocesan process on 25 October 2013 as having complied with the congregation's official regulations for conducting diocesan investigations.

The postulation (the officials in charge of the cause) submitted the official Positio dossier to the C.C.S. in Rome on 15 September 2015 for assessment and it was a dossier that drew upon the documents and interrogatories collected during the diocesan investigation. It also was meant to present the case for Giannotti's holiness and the manner in which this was perceived during his life. Theologians issued a unanimous agreement to the cause on 6 February 2018 as did the cardinal and bishop members of the C.C.S. on 26 March 2019.

Giannotti became titled as Venerable on 6 April 2019 after Pope Francis signed a decree acknowledging his life of heroic virtue.

The current postulator for this cause is the Capuchin friar Carlo Calloni.
