= Leroy McGahuey =

American murderer and suspected serial killer

- Born: Leroy Sanford McGahuey; October 18, 1920; St. Helens, Oregon, U.S.
- Died: August 20, 1962 (aged 41); Oregon State Penitentiary, Salem, Oregon, U.S.
- Cause of death: Execution by gas chamber
- Convictions: Oregon; First degree murder Washington; Carnal knowledge of a child
- Penalty: Oregon; Death; Washington; 1 year imprisonment, six months suspended sentence

Details
- Victims: 2–3
- Span of crimes: 1957–1961
- Country: United States
- States: Oregon, possibly Washington
- Date apprehended: For the final time in February 1961

Leroy Sanford McGahuey (October 18, 1920 – August 20, 1962) was an American murderer and suspected serial killer convicted and executed for a double murder in Oregon in 1961, and a prime suspect in a 1957 murder in Washington State. He was the last person to be executed in Oregon before the state temporarily abolished capital punishment in 1964 and before Furman v. Georgia, and the final to be executed in the state's gas chamber.

== Murders ==
=== Eleanor Bollinger (suspected) ===
On July 6, 1957, 31-year-old Eleanor Bollinger, a Sunday school teacher residing in Mineral, Washington, went berry picking near her father's farmhouse but failed to return. On July 21, her body was found in some woodland, showing signs that she had been repeatedly stabbed and beaten. Investigators determined that she had likely been murdered in another location and then transported here, but with no useful information or viable suspects, the case quickly went cold.

=== Holt murders ===
On January 23, 1960, while working as a logger in Mineral, McGahuey was arrested for sexually abusing an underage girl and held on $5,000 bail at the Lewis County Jail. On March 14, he was convicted of the charge and sentenced to a year of imprisonment, with half the sentence being a suspended one with the requirement that he regularly report to a probation officer. McGahuey did not comply with these terms and instead fled to Medford, Oregon, where he continued to work as a logger.

While residing there, he began a romantic relationship with 32-year-old Loris Mae Holt, who lived separately from her estranged husband together with her 2-year-old son, Rod Cameron, at an apartment in Central Point. McGahuey eventually moved in to live in with them, but his relationship with Holt eventually started to degrade due to his violent outbursts. On February 13, 1961, during a heated argument, McGahuey proceeded to hit her on the head with a hammer, before proceeding to strangle, stab her twice in the chest with a knife and then ultimately shoot her in the head with a pistol. Reportedly unwilling to let the young boy grow up without a mother, he went to Rod's room and hit him once on the head with the hammer, killing him instantly.

After the murders, McGahuey wrapped the bodies in blankets and hid them in a closet before leaving. He later returned to the apartment, but after he found that it was locked from the inside, he broke in through the window to check if there was anything that could implicate him. McGahuey then barricaded the door with furniture and left through a window after cutting the screen. In an attempt to create an alibi for himself, he got on a freight train and went to California, returning to Medford a week later. He was sitting in a restaurant when he was spotted by Holt's estranged husband, Charles, who had recently been released from custody after being questioned as a suspect in the double murders.

== Arrest, trial, and appeals ==
Not long after, McGahuey was arrested for passing bad checks and held on $1,500 bail. He waived his right to an attorney and a preliminary hearing so he could get a fast trial, but in the meantime, he was re-investigated as a prime suspect in the Holt murders, despite successfully passing a lie detector test. While awaiting trial for the check charge, McGahuey broke down and admitted responsibility for the murders to the jailer, who quickly informed the authorities. When interviewed, McGahuey reiterated that he was guilty and had his confession transcribed and signed, but refused to tell the exact reason why he killed Loris.

Due to the similarities between these murders and the Bollinger killing, as well as the fact he worked in the area at the time, detectives from Washington State were dispatched to Oregon to interview McGahuey about the case. In addition, they considered extraditing him to face charges of parole violation, but in the end decided against it. McGahuey waived his right to a preliminary hearing and asked for a court-appointed attorney for his upcoming murder trial, following his indictment for first-degree murder by a grand jury. While awaiting the grand jury hearing, which was delayed because a member was unable to attend, the gun used in Loris' murder was found in a loan shop in Redding, California.

In the end, it was decided that McGahuey would be tried solely for murder of Rod Holt, as the prosecution could safely secure a death sentence in that case if convicted. He was successfully found guilty by jury verdict after four hours of deliberation, but since the jury did not recommend leniency, under contemporary law it meant that he would receive an automatic death sentence. On his sentencing date of July 31, McGahuey was promptly sentenced to die in Oregon's gas chamber.

While McGahuey appealed his sentence to the state courts, detectives from Washington continued to investigate him as a suspect in the Bollinger case. His plea was eventually rejected by the Oregon Supreme Court, and he was scheduled to receive an execution date in July 1962. At said hearing, his execution date was set for August 20, with his sole chance of escaping death being a recommendation for clemency from Governor Mark Hatfield. Hatfield refused to issue a stay of execution or commute his sentence, upholding the convictions of the lower courts.

== Execution ==
On August 20, 1962, McGahuey was executed in the state's gas chamber at the Oregon State Penitentiary in Salem. He appeared calm on the day of his death, and his last reported words were "That's it.", addressed to a deputy warden. His last meal consisted of a large steak. He was pronounced dead at 1:23 a.m.

At the time, it was the first execution conducted in the state in nine years. Following Furman v. Georgia, McGahuey would become the last inmate to be executed in Oregon's gas chamber and the last inmate executed in the state until 1996.

As of March 2025, Bollinger's murder remains unsolved, but McGahuey is presumably still considered the prime suspect in that case.

== See also ==
- Capital punishment in Oregon
- List of people executed in Oregon (pre-1972)
- List of people executed in the United States in 1962

Preceded by Albert Karnes	Executions carried out in Oregon	Succeeded by Douglas Franklin Wright
