= Robert Folkes =

Robert E. Lee Folkes (June 20, 1922 – January 5, 1945) was an African American man who was convicted and executed in 1945 for the murder of Martha James, a white woman. It has been suspected by some historians that he was wrongly convicted.

== Biography ==
Born on June 20, 1922, Folkes hailed from the Arkansas Delta. By the age of 12 he was working regular jobs in south Los Angeles. He attended Jefferson High in 1936 and 1937. In the early 1940s he was a railroad cook who regularly worked the round trip route between Los Angeles and Portland. Folkes would often walk into the passenger cars to pick up newspapers to read.

== Murder on a train ==
On Saturday January 23, 1943, Train No. 15 left Portland's Union Station after 1 a.m. heading to Los Angeles. The train carried Robert E. Lee Folkes and Martha James, a 21-year old from Norfolk, Virginia, who was following her husband, ENS Richard James—who had departed earlier in the day on a train for troops. Also on the train was Private Harold Wilson, a white U.S. Marine. At approximately 4:30 am, near the town of Tangent, OR, occupants of the car awoke to Martha James screaming, "Oh my God, he's killing me." Occupants of the train then found James's throat was slashed in her sleeping berth, and Wilson was seen covered in blood, standing beside the victim as she lay dying. At the time of the assault, Wilson had just been released from the brig at Naval Station Bremerton, where he had been held for allegations of "sexual assault and indecent behavior."

The first suspect was Martha's husband since he briefly went missing after the crime. However, it was soon determined that he could not have killed his since he was in a different section of the train. Wilson was also considered as a suspect.

Wilson claimed to have gotten dressed, determined the victim could not be helped, and chased after the assailant before any other person in the car was able to pull their curtains back and investigate the distress calls, and he then described the assailant to investigators as either a "light negro or dark white man." In fact, Wilson's description of the events and suspect changed in his statements to the police. As a result of this description, investigators turned their attention to Robert E. Lee Folkes, an African American cook on the train. A knife was found in his baggage, but it could not be determined whether it was the murder weapon.

== Case and execution ==
Robert E. Lee Folkes was taken into custody when the train arrived in Los Angeles on January 24, 1943, and eventually confessed to the murder after several days in custody. Folkes's conviction resulted from a confession, albeit the circumstances were questionable. As reported by his wife and mother who saw him after the interrogation, Folkes's face was swollen, and he was intoxicated. Folkes's defense attorney, Leroy L. Lomax, would later call this confession into question. Lomax went as far as to say that the Los Angeles police coerced Folkes's confession by force.

Linn Country District Attorney Harlow L. Weinrick failed to provide the defense with copies of the confessions Folkes supposedly stated, and Dr. Joseph Beeman, head of the Oregon State Police crime lab, refused to give the defense attorney copies of the autopsy. The autopsy report would have been crucial to the defense since it contained the results of the fingernail scrapings from material witnesses, such as Folkes. The fingernail scrapings of Folkes contained only starch, sugar, soda, and grease, but no blood. Additionally, the defense was denied access to the crime scene.

Folkes's trial took place in April 1943 and garnered nationwide media attention. Throughout the trial, the prosecution articulated the motive behind the crime to be that Folkes killed James because all black men possess a violent sexual attraction to white women. The trial lasted 15 days, and despite Folkes's presence in the kitchen at the time of the murder being corroborated by several witnesses, the jury found Folkes guilty of the murder of Martha James. Judge L. Guy Lewelling sentenced him to death, and after several unsuccessful appeals, Folkes was executed in the gas chamber at the Oregon State Penitentiary on January 5, 1945. His last words were, "I have nothing to say, except that I am innocent."

Harold Wilson died after being struck by a car in Dayton, Ohio on October 23, 1995, at the age of 74. He had no criminal record in the decades after the murder of Martha James.

== Media after the trial ==
Following the trial, the media remained silent about the fact that Folkes did not receive a fair trial, with the exception of African American press. The Oregon Journal stated that "the defendant was given the benefit of every legal protection, including counsel, the right to appeal - a fair trial," and expressed relief that "the racial question apparently was not raised at all - at least in a way that would tend to awaken dormant prejudices or excite ill-advised violences." The Oregon Journal even stated that Folkes's courage in the face of his execution was "a tribute to him and his race."

Portland's African American press challenged the notion that Folkes received a fair trial, and challenged the biased coverage of the trial in the state's leading newspapers. The People's Observer, a prominent African American newspaper based in Portland, put out an editorial titled "Oregon's Sensational Travesty of Justice" which singled out the Oregon Journal's reporting as sensationalized and inaccurate.

The NAACP distributed a thirty-page pamphlet titled "The Facts in the Robert Folkes Case," that was mostly given out to clergymen, lawyers, and businesspeople that was prefaced with an overt criticism of the prosecution's case.

== Motivation for framing Folkes ==
It is suspected that there was motivation for framing Folkes for the murder. Folkes's union was one of the most radical unions the railroad dealt with during World War II, and its leader was a family friend of Folkes. The poor police work and the railroading of the defense at the trial would have then been an intentional anti-labor stance instigated by the Southern Pacific railroad. Max. G. Geier, chairman of the History department at Western Oregon University and author of The Color of Night: Race, Railroaders and Murder in the Wartime West, has stated, "I think it's a campaign of intimidation against the union. Here's what happens to uppity union members."

== Historical Context ==
"Murder on Train No. 15: Race Relations, the Home Front, and the Trial of Robert E. Lee Folkes" by Neil Barker encourages an assessment of the historical context surrounding the events of this incidence, trial, and execution. The trial took place during World War II as the population in Oregon urban areas expanded, which included the expansion of Portland's African American community Tens of thousands of African Americans migrated to the West Coast to find work in the shipyards and factories during World War II. These shifting demographics were paired with Folkes's position as a well-educated Black man who had grown up in South Central Los Angeles as it had grown culturally in a way somewhat similar to the Harlem Renaissance to make for a fraught, racially charged accusation, trial, and coerced confession.

At the time of this incident, however, Albany, where this event took place, had very few Black residents and was essentially still a sundown town.

== See also ==
- Capital punishment in Oregon
- List of people executed in Oregon (pre-1972)
- List of people executed in the United States in 1945
