= Bernhard Nooni =

Estonian footballer

Personal information
- Full name: Bernhard Voldemar Noony
- Date of birth: 10 February 1909
- Place of birth: Rannamõisa
- Date of death: 8 May 1997 (aged 88)
- Place of death: Tallinn
- Height: 1.80 m (5 ft 11 in)
- Position: Goalkeeper

Senior career*
Years	Team	Apps	(Gls)
1931–1932	Tallinna JK		
1932–1935	Tallinna Kalev		
1935–1936	Tallinna JK		

International career
1933	Estonia	1	(0)
- * Club domestic league appearances and goals

Bernhard Nooni (born 10 February 1909 Rannamõisa, Harku Parish, Harju County, Estonia) was an Estonian footballer who played for Tallinna JK as a Goalkeeper (association football) He made one appearance for the Estonia national football team in 1933.
