= Huang Liang (chemist) =

Chinese chemist and academician

- 黄量
- Born: 20 May 1920; Shanghai, China
- Died: 21 November 2013 (aged 93); United States
- Education: St. John's University, Shanghai; Cornell University
- Scientific career
- Fields: Organic Chemistry
- Workplaces: Shanghai Institute of Materia Medica Chinese Academy of Medical Science

Chinese name
- Simplified Chinese: 黄量
- Traditional Chinese: 黃量
Transcriptions
Standard Mandarin
- Hanyu Pinyin: Huáng Liàng

Huang Liang (Chinese: 黄量; 22 May 1920 – 21 November 2013) was a Chinese chemist, and an academician of the Chinese Academy of Sciences. She was a member of the 5th, 6th and 7th National Committee of the Chinese People's Political Consultative Conference.

== Biography ==
Huang was born in Shanghai, on 22 May 1920. In 1938, she enrolled at St. John's University, Shanghai, where she majored in the Department of Chemistry. After university in 1942, Huang worked in Shanghai Biochemical Pharmaceutical Factory for a short time. In 1943, she successively taught at the Central Industrial Experimental Institute and the Department of Chemistry, Shanghai Medical University (now Shanghai Medical College, Fudan University).

In 1946, recommended by Professor Taykor, former head of the Department of Chemistry at St. John's University, Shanghai, she went to the Department of Chemistry at Cornell University in the United States to further studies and received a doctor degree in organic chemistry in 1949. She later worked in the laboratories of Bryn Mawr College (1949–1950), Cornell University (1950–1952), Wayne State University (1952–1954), and Iowa State University (1954–1956).

Huang returned to China in 1956 and in February 1957 worked in the Department of Pharmacy, Central Health Research Institute, which was reshuffled as the Institute of Materia Medica Chinese Academy of Medical Science in 1958. In 1960, she became director of Drug Synthesis Room, and served until 1983. During the ten-year Cultural Revolution, she forced to work in the fields instead of doing research in the laboratory. In the 1990s, she and academician Dai Lixin jointly led the major project of the Ninth Five Year Plan – "Chemical and Biological Research of Chiral Drugs".

On 21 November 2013, Huang died in the United States at the age of 93.

== Contributions ==
Huang guided research and developed Jiangya Ling, the first blood pressure lowering drug in China.

== Family ==
Huang was married to Liu Jinxu (刘金旭; 1917–1997), an animal nutritionist.

== Honours and awards ==
- 1958 Title of "National March-Eighth Red-Banner Pacesetter"
- 1980 Member of the Chinese Academy of Sciences (CAS)
- 1987 State Science and Technology Progress Award (Third Class) for synthesis and study of indigo red derivatives
- 1987 State Technological Invention Award (Third Class) for determination of the structure of a new anti tapeworm drug, hecao phenol.
- 1998 Science and Technology Progress Award of the Ho Leung Ho Lee Foundation
