= Leicester Spring =

New Zealand cricketer

Personal information
- Full name: Leicester Russell Spring
- Born: 2 September 1908; Waipawa, New Zealand
- Died: 31 May 1997 (aged 88); Auckland, New Zealand
- Source: ESPNcricinfo, 22 June 2016

Leicester Spring (2 September 1908 – 31 May 1997) was a New Zealand cricketer. He played three first-class matches for Auckland in 1936/37.

Spring was also a thoroughbred racehorse owner. He bought his first horse, Rising Fast, for 325 guineas in 1950. Rising Fast won numerous Group One races in New Zealand and Australia, including the 1954 Melbourne Cup, and ended up winning 66,765 pounds in prize money. With the proceeds, Spring was able to buy a sheep and cattle farm at Te Awamutu, build a new house in Whakatāne, and expand his newspaper the Whakatane Beacon.
