= Rannamõisa =

Village in Estonia

- Village
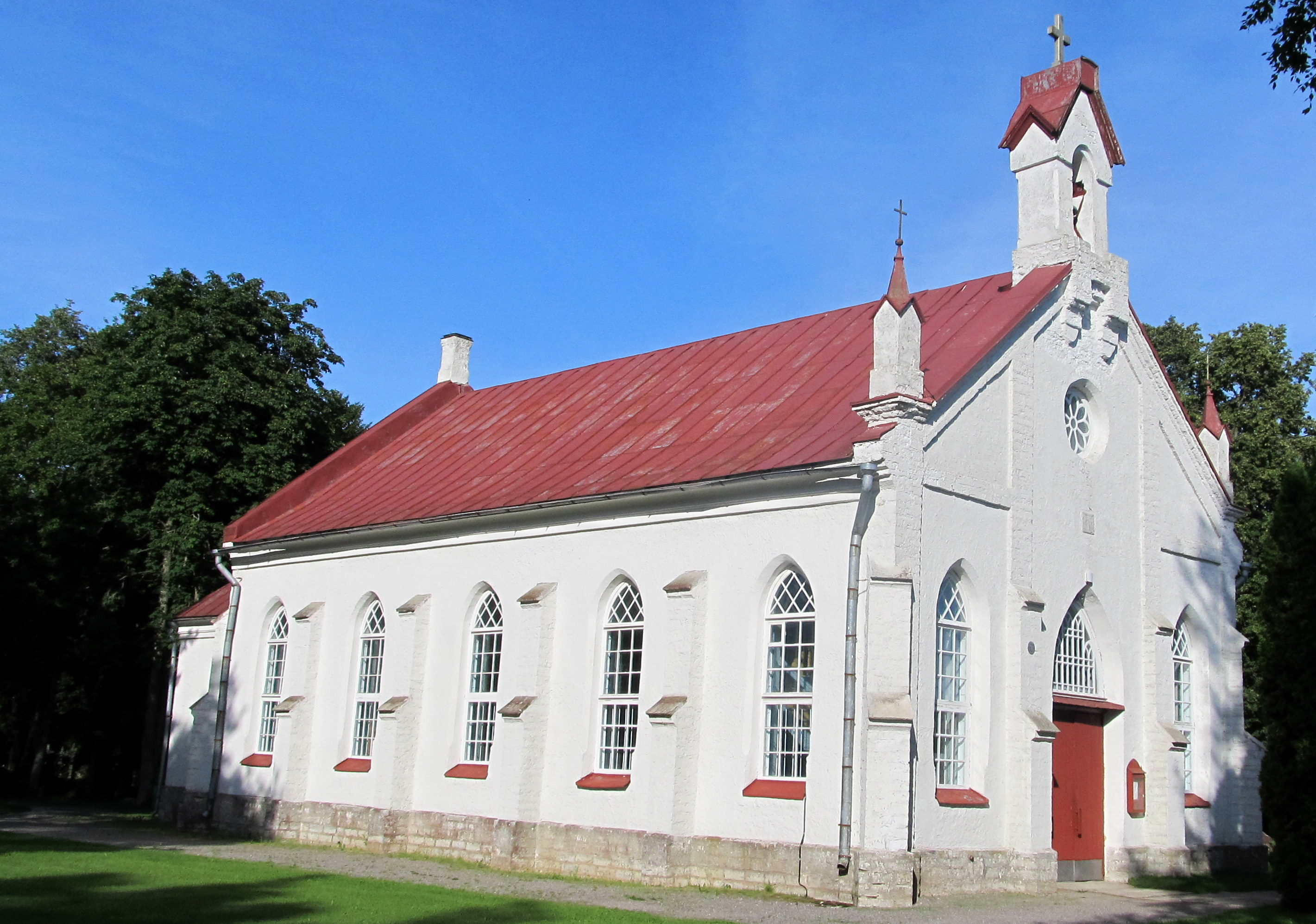
- Rannamõisa church

- Location in Estonia
- Coordinates: 59°26′34″N 24°30′40″E
- Country: Estonia
- County: Harju County
- Municipality: Harku Parish

Population (01.06.2010)
  - Total: 645

Rannamõisa is a village in Harku Parish, Harju County in northern Estonia. It has a population of 645 (as of 1 June 2010).

The Rannamõisa cliff coastline was depicted on the 50 kroon that circulated in 1928–1940.

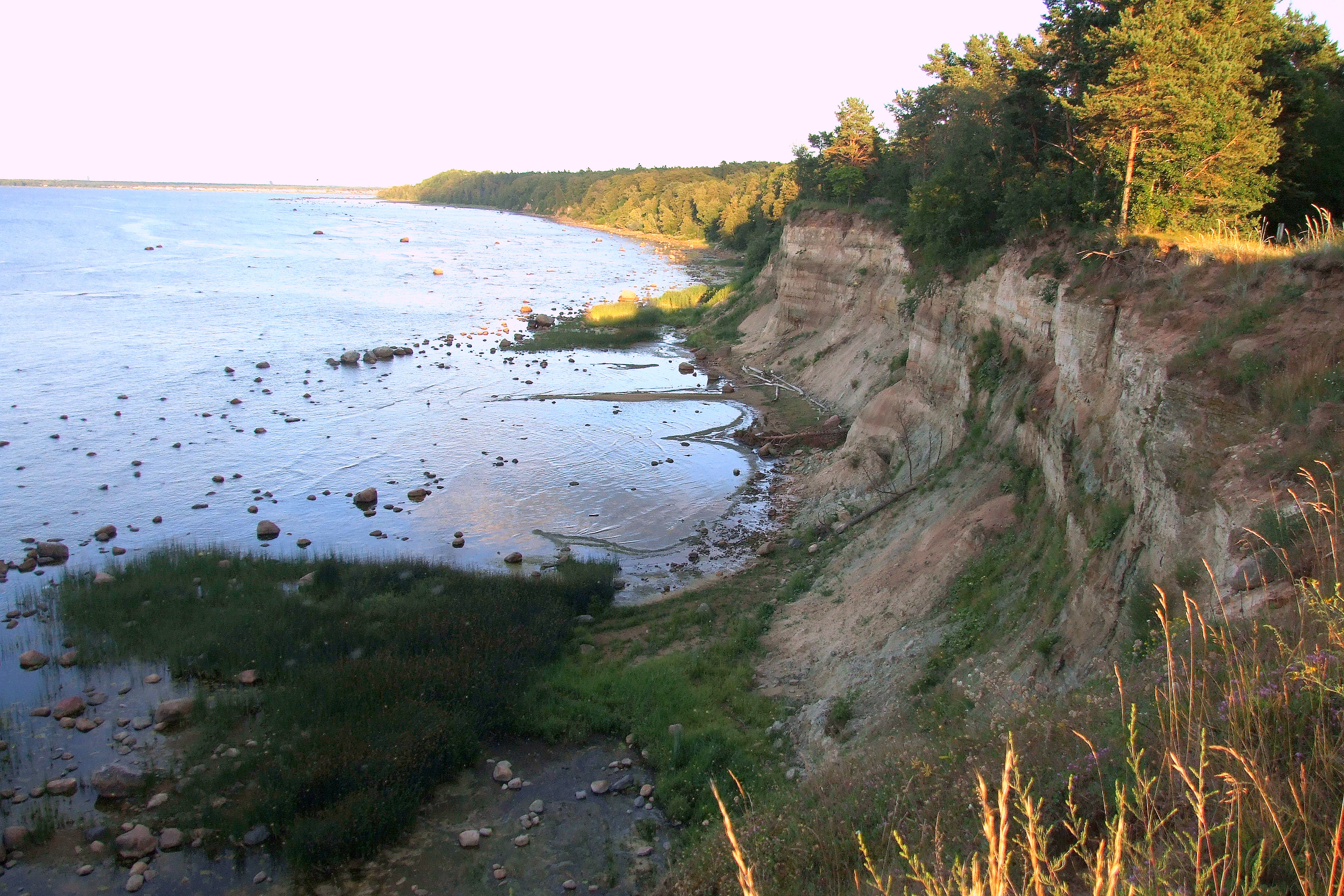
Ilmandu bank
