= Johanna Angermeyer =

American writer

Johanna Angermeyer, American-born author and artist, (born 1948) is the author of the critically acclaimed My Father's Island: A Galapagos Quest (now in its 9 reprint) and children's picture books, (illustrated by the author): "Is Your Mama An Iguana?" and "How The Booby Got Its Feet". An exhibiting artist and lecturer on Ecuador and the Galapagos Islands, the author lived for many decades in the UK but has now moved back to Ecuador.

== Family background ==
Angermeyer's father Johannes Angermeyer and his four brothers, all artists and musicians, sailed from Hitler’s Germany in 1935 to the Galapagos but, after shipwreck off the coast of England, only four of the five made it to the then sparsely inhabited Enchanted Islands where they lived like Robinson Crusoes.

In 1936 Emmasha, Johanna Angermeyer's Russian American mother, married Capitan Marco Aguirre, an aristocrat and famous aviator, whom she met in Lincoln, Nebraska, when he attended the Charles Lindbergh Flying School there. In 1938 his plane crashed in the Andes while he was rushing to Emmasha’s side after she gave birth to their son.

In 1939 Emmasha met Johannes Angermeyer, one of the first settlers on the Galapagos Islands, in Ecuador. They married, had a daughter Mary, and planned to live in the remote islands. However, in 1941 when the Japanese attacked Pearl Harbor, all American civilians in Ecuador were repatriated. It was during this enforced separation, with her mother in the USA, that Johanna was born. Shortly afterwards her father in Ecuador, unable to return to his island, sickened and died.

== Early years ==
Johanna was born in Lincoln, Nebraska, and her widowed mother moved their family to California in the 1950s. Bored at school, eight-year-old Johanna received most of her education roaming the public library where her mother worked in the children’s book section.

In 1960 the family moved back to Quito. Young Johanna dreamed of reaching the Galapagos and learning more about the father she never knew. In 1961 her family made the four-day voyage from Guayaquil to Santa Cruz in the Galapagos. There Johanna fell in love with her larger-than-life uncles and the pioneering lifestyle but, aged thirteen, she reluctantly returned to school in Quito.

When Johanna finished her studies at El Conservatorio de Musica, she roamed the hills of the capital, giving guitar lessons and teaching at a kindergarten where she began to write and illustrate picture books for children.

== Back to the Galapagos ==
In 1971 she and her family moved to Santa Cruz Island. Johanna sold paintings, worked as a cook aboard a yacht and then as a guide on cruises around the archipelago.

As the world began to discover the Galapagos, Johanna moved to a remote farm in the lush highlands. It was here that she met her English husband when he helped her catch a wild colt. Johanna began interviewing the original settlers. These interviews later became part of her first book, My Father's Island: A Galapagos Quest, in which she pieces together her parents' impossibly romantic story.

== Move to Europe ==
Johanna and her husband moved to England where they worked for the National Trust, caring for stately homes across the country.

Dr John Treherne, author, and President of Downing College, Cambridge, encouraged Johanna to write and it was while living in William Wordsworth’s House in Cumbria, that she finished writing her book, My Father's Island, published by Viking - Penguin..

While living in Rudyard Kipling’s home "Batemans", Johanna resumed painting and exhibiting her work.

Johanna wrote and illustrated two children’s books about the Galapagos. "Is Your Mama an Iguana" and "How the Booby got its Feet". In 2015 the author and her husband moved to Vilcabamba, Ecuador. Here in this peaceful valley Johanna continues to write and illustrate books.
