= Harry Charles Moore =

American murderer

- Born: May 5, 1941; Salem, Oregon, U.S.
- Died: May 16, 1997 (aged 56); Oregon State Penitentiary, Salem, Oregon, U.S.
- Cause of death: Execution by lethal injection
- Other name: Jerry Lee Moore
- Children: 3
- Conviction: Aggravated murder (2 counts)
- Penalty: Death (July 20, 1993)

Details
- Victims: Thomas B. Lauri, 60; Barbara Jean Cunningham, 49
- Date: June 5, 1992
- Country: United States
- State: Oregon

Harry Charles Moore (May 5, 1941 – May 16, 1997) was an American convicted murderer who was executed in Oregon for the 1992 murders of Thomas Lauri and Barbara Cunningham. He was the second person executed by the state of Oregon since 1978 and remains the state's most recent execution.

== Murders ==
On June 5, 1992, Moore shot Thomas Lauri four times in the face with a 9 mm pistol in front of a Salem post office. He then drove to Barbara Cunningham's house, shot her in the abdomen, and then fired three more rounds into her head. Cunningham was Moore's half-sister, and Lauri was her former husband. Moore said he had killed them because he thought they would move to Las Vegas with his estranged wife and baby daughter and expose them to a life of prostitution and drugs.

== Sentencing and execution ==
Moore was sentenced to death on July 20, 1993. He later threatened to sue anyone who tried to stop his execution. He also appealed to the Oregon Supreme Court to drop the automatic appeal of his sentence. Moore's last meal consisted of two green apples, two red apples, a tray of fresh fruit, and two 2-liter bottles of Coke.

Just prior to the execution, Moore asked the warden if he could borrow the keys to the prison, promising to "bring them right back." The request was denied. As Moore lay dying, he whispered: "I want the last word I say to be Jennifer, J-e-n-n-i-f-e-r." Jennifer is the name of Moore's daughter by his niece Cindy Moore.

Moore was executed by lethal injection on May 16, 1997. He remains the second of only two people to be executed in Oregon since the resumption of the death penalty. The other was convicted serial killer Douglas Franklin Wright in 1996. Both waived their appeals and asked that the execution be carried out.

== See also ==
- Capital punishment in Oregon
- Capital punishment in the United States
- List of homicides in Oregon
- List of most recent executions by jurisdiction
- List of people executed in Oregon
- List of people executed in the United States in 1997

Executions carried out in Oregon
Preceded by Douglas Franklin Wright September 6, 1996	Harry Charles Moore; May 16, 1997	Succeeded by none
Executions carried out in the United States
Preceded by Anthony Westley – Texas May 13, 1997	Harry Charles Moore – Oregon; May 16, 1997	Succeeded by Clifton Belyeu – Texas May 16, 1997
