= Eduardo Jardón =

Spanish field hockey player (1914–1997)

Personal information
- Nationality: Spanish
- Born: 3 October 1914 Oviedo, Spain
- Died: 20 May 1997 (aged 82) Madrid, Spain

Sport
- Sport: Field hockey

Eduardo Jardón (3 October 1914 – 20 May 1997) was a Spanish field hockey player. He competed in the men's tournament at the 1948 Summer Olympics.
