= Basilica Nossa Senhora de Penha =

Coordinates: 8.0686°S 34.8786°W

- Basílica da Penha
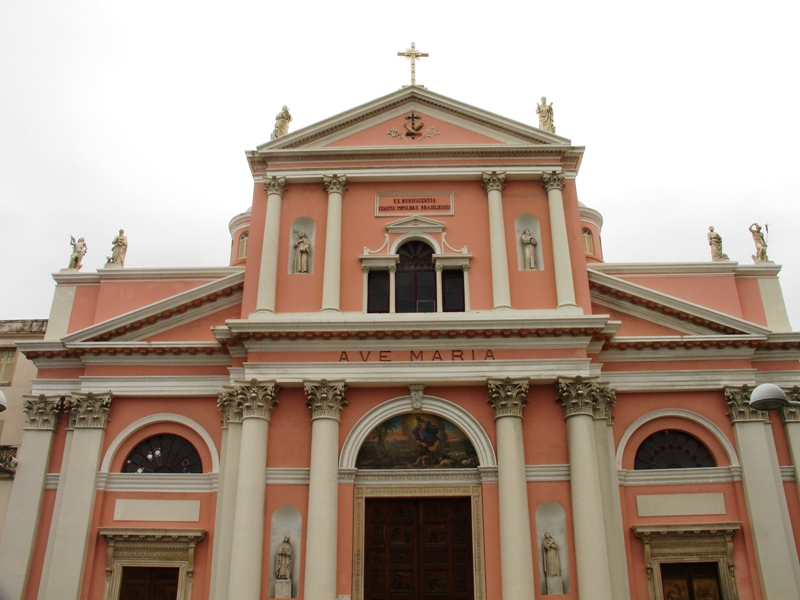
- Basilica Nossa Senhora de Penha
- Location: Recife
- Country: Brazil
- Denomination: Roman Catholic Church

History
- Founded: 1665
- Founder: French Capuchin Franciscans

Architecture
- Style: Renaissance Revival
- Completed: 1882

The Nossa Senhora de Penha (transl. Basilica of Our Lady of the Rock) or the Basilica da Penha is a Roman Catholic religious basilica located in the city of Recife, in the state of Pernambuco, Brazil. Belonging to the Order of Friars Minor Capuchin, in the archdiocese of Olinda and Recife, its patron is the Virgin of the Rock.

== History ==
The origin of the location of the Basílica da Penha dates back to a small oratory located "Outside the Gate of Santo Antônio", corresponding, with a slight difference, to the plot of land where today the contemporary building is erected. The oratory was instituted in 1655 by the French Capuchin Franciscans and expanded on April 16 of the same year, in a plot donated by Belchior Alves Camello and his wife Joanna Bezerra. However, the present temple was constructed between the years of 1870 and 1882, being the only church in Corinthian style of the Pernambuco State. It is inspired by the architecture of the San Giorgio Maggiore church of Venice. In 1870, the Capuchins of Veneto (Italy) demolished the old Church of Penha and erected the imposing and current Basilica da Penha, concluding the work in 1882. On September 2, 2007, a restoration work began that lasted until July 4, 2014, the date of its re-inauguration. The works cost about R$6 million and have not yet finished. The work of the restorers revealed several features that had been lost by the passage of time. The original color of the gilded saint above the external dome has been restored and a vitrified panel of mosaic made in Italy has been found. The church is known for the traditional event of the Blessing of Felix of Cantalice which took place close to the Basilica while the restoration lasted.

Unlike the Baroque style used in most of Recife's churches, the Basilica da Penha is of Renaissance Revival architecture and an architectural work of vast artistic merit both inside and outside. Unfortunately, most of the works do not have documentation indicating authorship, leaving a gap in the historical survey of the building. Among the few pieces of well-known authorship we find, in the altarpiece, the figures of St. Francis of Assisi and St. Anthony carved in marble in relief by Italian Valentino Panciera Besarel (1829-1902) and low relief on the high altar. But there are indications that various other works come from the same sculptor. There are also on the high altar frescoes by Brazilian Murillo La Greca (1899-1985).

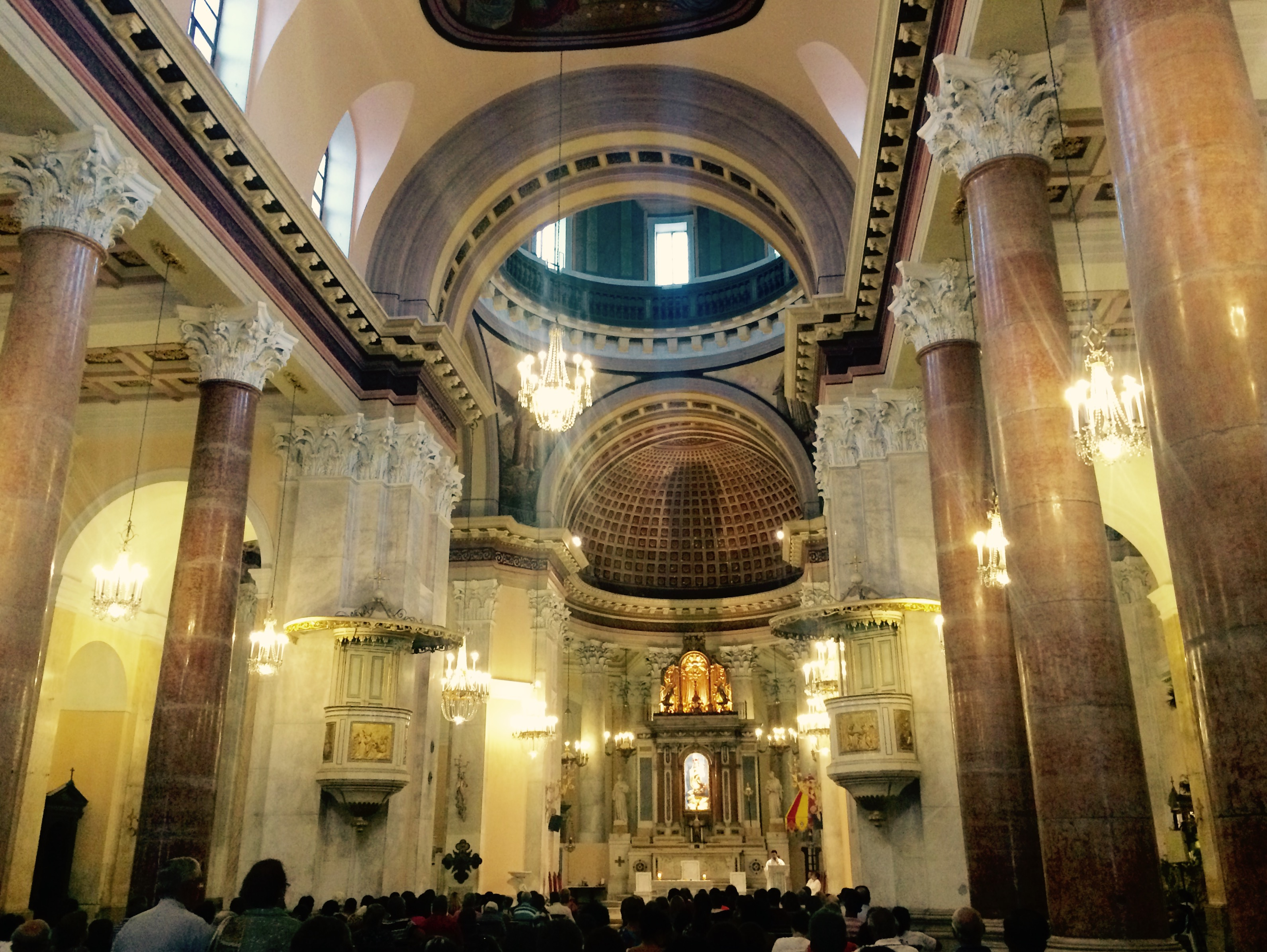
Internal view
