= Wang You =

Chinese biochemist

Wang You (Chinese: 汪猷; pinyin: Wāng Yóu; 7 June 1910 – 6 May 1997), also known as Yu Wang, was a Chinese biochemist. He was a pioneer of antibiotics and biochemistry studies in China.

== Life ==
Wang was born in Hangzhou, Zhejiang Province. He first studied applied chemistry at Zhejiang University. He went to Nanjing and graduated from the Department of Industrial Chemistry, University of Nanking in 1931. He obtained his PhD from the Ludwig-Maximilians-Universität München (LMU) in 1937.

Between November 1952 and July 1984, chronologically, Wang was the deputy director, acting director, director (later the honorary director 1984–1997) of the Shanghai Institute of Organic Chemistry, Chinese Academy of Sciences (Shanghai Institute of Organic Chemistry is the most prestigious institute for organic chemistry research in China).

Wang participated and played an important role in the artificial synthesis of cattle insulin. He also made contributions to modern Chinese biochemical industries.

== Membership ==
- Member, Chinese Academy of Sciences (1955 election)
- Foreign member, French Academy of Sciences (1984)
- Foreign member, Bavarian Academy of Sciences and Humanities (1988)
- Honorary member, American Society for Biochemistry and Molecular Biology (1986)
