= Joachim Angermeyer =

German businessman and politician (1923–1997)

- Born: December 18, 1923; Hamburg, Germany
- Died: 8 May 1997 (aged 73); Bad Rothenfelde, Lower Saxony, Germany
- Occupations: Businessman and politician
- Political party: German Free Democratic Party

Joachim-Hans Angermeyer (18 December 1923 – 8 May 1997) was a German businessman and politician from the German Free Democratic Party. He was a member of the German Bundestag from 1976 to 1980.

== Life and career ==
Angermeyer was born the son of a businessman. After attending Gymnasium he completed a commercial apprenticeship and worked from 1949 until 1962 as an employee. In 1975, he became Deputy Chairman of the Advisory Board of casinos in Bad Bentheim and Bad Zwischenahn. Afterwards, he was managing director of a company in Osnabrück until 1980.

=== Politics ===
In 1941, he joined the Nazi Party (membership number 8,559,827). After the Second World War, he became a member of the German Free Democratic Party. Angermeyer belonged to the German Bundestag from 1976 to 1980.
