= Capital punishment in Oregon =

Capital punishment is a legal, but disused, penalty in the U.S. state of Oregon, as provided by the Constitution of Oregon. No executions have been carried out since that of Harry Charles Moore in 1997, and successive governors of Oregon have issued moratoriums on executions that have been in continuous effect since November 2011. In 2022, Governor Kate Brown ordered the state's death chamber to be dismantled.

Governor John Kitzhaber began the moratorium on executions in Oregon, canceling a planned execution and ordering a review of the death penalty system in the state. Kitzhaber's successor, Governor Kate Brown, affirmed her commitment to the moratorium, and furthermore commuted all death sentences in December 2022, emptying the state's death row; her successor, Tina Kotek, has continued the moratorium.

Oregon no longer allows for non-unanimous juries in felony cases, and all felony (including capital) cases in Oregon require a unanimous jury verdict. In case of a hung jury during the penalty phase of the trial, a life sentence is issued, even if a single juror opposed death (there is no retrial). The governor of Oregon has sole authority over clemency, including capital cases.

Executions were carried out by lethal injection in Oregon. Oregon's death row was located, and executions were carried out, at the Oregon State Penitentiary in Salem. The use of death row has since been phased out by the Oregon Department of Corrections.

== Early history ==
The first death sentence carried out under the territorial government, apart from the hanging of the 5 Cayuse in 1850, came on April 18, 1851, when William Kendall was hanged in Salem. Kendall's sentence was handed down by Judge William Strong of the Oregon Supreme Court. Five Cayuse Native American men were taken to Oregon City, tried and sentenced to hang. Before their execution on June 3, 1850, the leader, Tiloukaikt, accepted Catholic last rites. Tiloukaikt spoke on the gallows, "Did not your missionaries teach us that Christ died to save his people? So we die to save our people."

Capital punishment was made explicitly legal by statute in 1864, and executions have been carried out exclusively at the Oregon State Penitentiary in Salem since 1904. The death penalty was outlawed between 1914 and 1920, again between 1964 and 1978, and then again between a 1981 Oregon Supreme Court ruling and a 1984 ballot measure.

Oregon voters amended the Constitution in 1914, to repeal the death penalty, by a margin of 50.04%. The repeal was an initiative of Governor Oswald West. However, the death penalty was restored in 1920 with 56% of voters favoring its use. From 1864 to 1931, executions were carried out by hanging. However, beginning with the execution of LeRoy Hershel McCarthy, on January 30, 1939, Oregon began using lethal gas in gas chamber executions. The state executed seventeen men in this manner, including Robert E. Lee Folkes. The last of these gas-inhalation executions took place on 20 August 1962, with the execution of Leroy McGahuey. In 1964 voters passed Measure 1, a constitutional amendment prohibiting capital punishment, with 60% of voters approving. Two days later, Governor Mark Hatfield commuted the sentences of the state's three death row inmates, Larry West Shipley, Herbert Floyd Mitchell, and Jeannace June Freeman.

== Reinstatement ==
Voters reenacted the death penalty in the general election of 1978, by statute; Measure 8 required the death penalty in certain murder cases. Measure 8 was overturned by the Oregon Supreme Court in 1981, on the grounds that it denied defendants the right to be tried by a jury of their peers.

In 1984, Measure 6 amended the state constitution to once more make the death penalty legal. Measure 7, a statutory measure passed in the same year, required a separate sentencing hearing before a jury in cases of aggravated murder.

In 1988, the U.S. Supreme Court ruling in Penry v. Lynaugh affected the Oregon death penalty, because Oregon's law is based on the Texas law involved in the case. Seventeen Oregon cases were remanded for resentencing following Penry; eight of those convicts were re-sentenced to death.

In 2000, the Benetton Group featured several inmates on Oregon's death row in a controversial anti-death penalty advertising campaign. Cesar Barone, Conan Wayne Hale, Jesse Caleb Compton, and Alberto Reyes Camarena were featured in the ad.

Between 1904 and 1994, 115 people were sentenced to death in Oregon, and 58 of those were executed.

In response to Governor Kitzhaber's 2011 moratorium, death row inmate Gary Haugen sued the Governor, claiming he had the right to be executed, and seeking the Court to order Kitzhaber to carry out the execution. In June 2013, the Oregon Supreme Court ruled in the case Haugen v. Kitzhaber that Haugen had no legal right to be executed, and that Kitzhaber's reprieve of Haugen's execution did not require Haugen's agreement to be effective.

On December 13, 2022, Governor Kate Brown announced that she would commute the sentences of all 17 death row inmates, effective December 14, 2022. She also directed the Oregon Department of Corrections to dismantle Oregon's lethal injection death chamber. Governor Brown's successor, Tina Kotek, stated her own personal opposition to the death penalty and her intention to continue the moratorium established by her predecessors. Consequently, nobody has been executed by the State of Oregon since 1997.

== 2022 Death Row Commutations ==
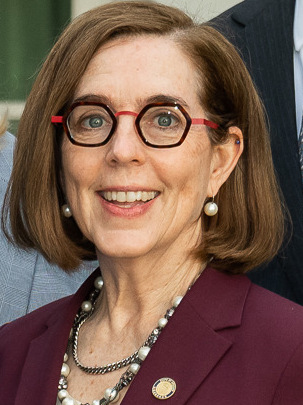
Kate Brown (cropped from: President Joe Biden poses for a photo with governors in the White House Rose Garden, Friday, October 22, 2021, after a meeting in the Oval Office). (Official White House Photo by Adam Schultz)

On December 13, 2022, Oregon Governor Kate Brown announced that she would commute the death sentences of all 17 individuals remaining on the state's death row. The commutations took effect on December 14, changing each sentence to life imprisonment without the possibility of parole. Brown used her executive clemency authority to issue the commutations during the final weeks of her administration, leaving Oregon without any prisoners serving death sentences. The decision did not overturn the individuals' convictions or result in their release from prison. Although Oregon's death row was cleared, capital punishment remained legal under state law.

The decision followed several years of changes to Oregon's death penalty system. In 2011, Governor John Kitzhaber established a moratorium on executions, which Brown continued after taking office in 2015. In 2019, Oregon passed Senate Bill 1013, which significantly narrowed the circumstances under which capital punishment could be imposed. These changes limited the use of the death penalty to a smaller category of aggravated murder offenses. By the time Brown announced the commutations, Oregon had not carried out an execution since 1997.

Brown explained that the commutations reflected her opposition to capital punishment rather than the individual circumstances of those receiving clemency. In her official announcement, she described the death penalty as an irreversible punishment and raised concerns about its cost, effectiveness, and fairness. She argued that the possibility of wrongful convictions made executions particularly concerning because an execution cannot be reversed if an error is later discovered. Brown also stated that the death penalty had not been applied fairly or equitably. Unlike other commutations she had granted, this decision was not based on evidence of rehabilitation or personal changes among the prisoners.

In addition to the commutations, Brown directed the Oregon Department of Corrections to dismantle the state's execution chamber at Oregon State Penitentiary in Salem. The chamber had remained unused for more than two decades, following Oregon's last execution in 1997. Brown's administration considered the chamber unnecessary because there were no longer any prisoners under an active death sentence. The decision to dismantle the chamber accompanied the broader effort to reduce the use of capital punishment in Oregon.

The announcement received mixed reactions from government officials, criminal justice organizations, and victims' families. Advocates who opposed capital punishment supported the decision, while several Republican lawmakers, prosecutors, and relatives of murder victims criticized it. Oregon Senate Republican Leader Tim Knopp questioned whether the governor should make such a decision without a statewide vote. Some victims' family members also expressed frustration that the commutations had been made without their support. Brown acknowledged the uncertainty experienced by families who had waited years for death sentences to be carried out and stated that she hoped the decision would bring greater finality to the cases.

The commutations did not abolish the death penalty in Oregon or prevent courts from imposing future death sentences in cases permitted under state law. Instead, they eliminated the existing death sentences while leaving the state's legal framework for capital punishment in place. Brown's successor, Governor Tina Kotek, also expressed opposition to capital punishment and committed to continuing the moratorium on executions. The 2022 commutations became another development in Oregon's movement away from carrying out executions, following the 2011 moratorium and the legislative restrictions adopted in 2019.

== Executions since 1978 ==
2 people have been executed in Oregon since the reinstatement of capital punishment in 1978. Both waived their appeals and asked that the execution be carried out.

No.	Name	Race	Age	Sex	Date of execution	Method	County	Victim(s)	Governor
1	Douglas Franklin Wright	White	56	M	September 6, 1996	Lethal injection	Marion	Anthony Barker, William Marks, and William Davis	John Kitzhaber
2	Harry Charles Moore	White	56	M	May 16, 1997	Lethal injection	Wasco	Thomas Lauri and Barbara Cunningham	John Kitzhaber

== Capital crimes ==
Aggravated murder is the only crime punishable by death in Oregon. On 1 August 2019, Governor Kate Brown signed a bill that restricts the death penalty to four cases:

(1) acts of terrorism in which two or more people are killed by an organized terrorist group
(2) premeditated murders of children aged 13 or younger
(3) prison murders committed by those already incarcerated for aggravated murder
(4) premeditated murders of police or correctional officers

== See also ==
- List of death row inmates in the United States § Oregon
- Crime in Oregon
- Law of Oregon
- Jeannace June Freeman
- List of Oregon ballot measures
