= Deaths in July 1997 =

The following is a list of notable deaths in July 1997.

Entries for each day are listed alphabetically by surname. A typical entry lists information in the following sequence:

- Name, age, country of citizenship at birth, subsequent country of citizenship (if applicable), reason for notability, cause of death (if known), and reference.

== July 1997 ==
=== 1 ===
- Lester Asheim, 83, American librarian and scholar of library science.
- Annie Fratellini, 64, French circus artist, film actress and clown, cancer.
- Joshua Hassan, 81, Gibraltarian politician and Chief Minister of Gibraltar.
- David Martin, 81, Australian novelist, poet, playwright, journalist, and reviewer and lecturer.
- Harold McQueen, Jr., 44, American convicted murderer, execution by electric chair.
- Robert Mitchum, 79, American actor (The Story of G.I. Joe, Cape Fear, The Night of the Hunter), complications from lung cancer and emphysema.
- Mohammad Ali Mojtahedi, 88, Iranian University professor.
- Gerhard Wiltfang, 51, German equestrian and Olympic champion (1972).

=== 2 ===
- George Antonio, 82, English footballer.
- Chiquito, 65, Filipino actor and comedian, liver cancer.
- Flint Gregory Hunt, 38, American convicted murderer, execution by lethal injection.
- Dee Moore, 83, American Major League Baseball player (Cincinnati Reds, Brooklyn Dodgers, Philadelphia Phillies).
- James Stewart, 89, American actor (It's a Wonderful Life, Rear Window, Vertigo), Oscar winner (1941), heart attack as a result of pulmonary embolism.

=== 3 ===
- Johnny Copeland, 60, American blues guitarist and singer, complications during heart surgery.
- Gloster B. Current, 84, American NAACP activist, leukemia and pneumonia.
- Natalia Dumitresco, 81, French-Romanian abstract painter.
- Rufe Gentry, 79, American baseball player (Detroit Tigers).
- Michael James MacDonald, 87, Canadian politician and union leader.
- Thomas Sgovio, 80, American artist and Soviet Union Gulag inmate.
- Stanley Stanczyk, 72, American weightlifter and Olympian (1948, 1952).

=== 4 ===
- William Cadogan, 7th Earl Cadogan, British peer and military officer.
- Bengt Danielsson, 75, Swedish anthropologist, writer, and a crew member on the Kon-Tiki raft expedition.
- Bob David, 76, American football player (Los Angeles Rams, Chicago Rockets).
- Charles Kuralt, 62, American journalist, complications from lupus.
- Slobodan Mišković, 52, Serbian handball coach, player and Olympian (1972).
- Miguel Najdorf, 87, Polish-Argentinian chess grandmaster.
- Amado Carrillo Palomino, 40, Mexican drug lord, complications during cosmetic surgery.
- Bevis Reid, 78, British track and field athlete and Olympian (1948).
- Eddie Smith, 70, Australian racing cyclist.
- John Zachary Young, 90, English zoologist and neurophysiologist.

=== 5 ===
- Bob Dees, 67, American gridiron football player (Green Bay Packers).
- Jean-Marie Domenach, 75, French writer and intellectual.
- Kainoyama Isamu, 57, Japanese sumo wrestler.
- Mrs. Miller, 89, American singer.
- Les Norman, 83, Australian politician.
- Herm Schuessler, 82, American basketball player.
- Arunasalam Thangathurai, 61, Sri Lankan Tamil politician.

=== 6 ===
- Chetan Anand, 76, Indian Hindi film producer, screenwriter and director.
- Gabriel Asaad, 90, Turkish-Swedish Assyrian composer and musician.
- Gabriel Berthomieu, 73, French rugby player.
- Dorothy Buffum Chandler, 96, American cultural leader.
- Helmi Abou El-Maati, Egyptian Olympic footballer (1948).
- Stanisław Horno-Popławski, 94, Russian-Polish painter, sculptor and pedagogue.
- Gene James, 72, American basketball player (New York Knicks, Baltimore Bullets).
- Jim MacBeth, 83, Australian rules footballer.
- Brun Smith, 75, New Zealand cricket player.

=== 7 ===
- Mate Boban, 57, Bosnian Croat politician and the only president of the Croatian Republic of Herzeg-Bosnia, stroke.
- Alfons De Winter, 88, Belgian football player.
- Jerry Doggett, 80, American sportscaster.
- Raffaele Dolfato, 34, Italian rugby player and entrepreneur, traffic collision.
- Sven Håkansson, 87, Swedish Olympic long-distance runner (1948).
- Henry Howell, 76, American politician, cancer.
- Jean Luciano, 76, French football player and manager.
- Jeep McClain, 75, American baseball player.
- Oku Mumeo, 101, Japanese politician and feminist.
- Luis Aguirre Pinto, 89, Chilean composer, folk musician and folklorist.
- Royston Tickner, 74, British actor.
- Rolando Tinio, 60, Filipino poet, dramatist, actor, and essayist.
- Erik Zetterström, 92, Swedish writer and playwright.

=== 8 ===
- Charles L. Drake, 73, American geologist, heart failure.
- Dick van Dijk, 51, Dutch football player (FC Twente, Ajax Amsterdam), acute endocarditis.
- Georges Gay, 71, French racing cyclist.
- Guy Murchie, 90, American author and aviator.
- Abu Sadat Mohammad Sayem, 81, Bangladeshi jurist and statesman.
- Charles P. B. Taylor, 65, Canadian journalist, author, and thoroughbred racehorse owner and breeder, cancer.
- Tony Thomas, 69, British-American film historian, author, and producer, pneumonia.
- Max E. Youngstein, 84, American film producer.

=== 9 ===
- Carol Forman, 79, American actress.
- Aurelio González, 91, Paraguayan football player.
- Walter Korn, 89, Czech-American writer of books and magazine articles about chess.
- John Little, 50, American football player (New York Jets, Houston Oilers, Buffalo Bills).
- André Meyer, 77, French Olympic field hockey player (1948, 1952).
- Georgeta Năpăruș, 66, Romanian modernist painter.
- David Pitblado, British principal private secretary to successive Prime Ministers.
- Stan Rojek, 78, American baseball player.
- Marianne Schönauer, 77, Austrian actress.

=== 10 ===
- Ivor Allchurch, 67, Welsh football player.
- Bernard Elgood, 75, English cricketer and British Army officer.
- Dwight Lowry, 39, American baseball player (Detroit Tigers, Minnesota Twins), heart attack.
- Abe Okpik, 69, Canadian Inuit community leader.
- Frank R. Parker, 57, American civil rights lawyer and activist, complications from an aortic aneurysm.

=== 11 ===
- Felix Barker, 80, British drama critic and historian.
- Fred Beavis, 82, Canadian politician, pneumonia.
- Jack Carr, 83, Australian rules footballer.
- Percy Chivers, 88, Australian cricketer.
- Nina Bencich Woodside, 66, American public health official and college professor, plane crash.
- Joe Hauser, 98, American baseball player (Philadelphia Athletics, Cleveland Indians).
- Edward Lasker, 85, American businessman and thoroughbred racehorse owner.
- Keshav Mangave, 71, Indian Olympic wrestler (1952).
- Alfred Mellows, 75, English rower and Olympic medalist (1948).
- Jock Sturrock, 82, Australian yachtsman and Olympian (1948, 1952, 1956, 1960) .
- Robert V. Whitlow, 78, American military officer, football coach, and sports club executive.

=== 12 ===
- Pietro Buscaglia, 86, Italian football player.
- Meribeth E. Cameron, 92, American historian of China and academic.
- Blas Chumacero, 92, Mexican trade union leader.
- François Furet, 70, French historian, head injury while playing tennis, heart failure.
- Douglas Huebler, 72, American conceptual artist.
- Steve Karrys, 73, Canadian football player.
- Vinko Nikolić, 85, Croatian writer, poet and journalist.
- Frank Shuter, 54, New Zealand speedway rider, traffic collision.
- Jean Varenne, 71, French indologist.
- Miroslav Wiecek, 65, Czech football player.

=== 13 ===
- Garfield Barwick, 94, Australian politician, lawyer, and Chief Justice of Australia.
- Miguel Ángel Blanco, 29, Spanish politician and ETA victim, executed.
- Alexandra Danilova, 93, Russian-American prima ballerina.
- Rosy Gibb, 54, Irish social worker, clown, and magician, cancer.
- Ekaterina Kalinchuk, 74, Soviet gymnast and Olympic champion (1952).
- Kurt Land, 84, Austrian-Argentine film director.
- Edi Rada, 74, Austrian figure skater and Olympic medalist (1948).
- Alf Tveten, 84, Norwegian Olympic sailor (1936).

=== 14 ===
- Eddie Finnigan, 84, Canadian ice hockey player (St. Louis Eagles, Boston Bruins).
- Eugene Goossen, 76, American art critic and art historian, pneumonia.
- Joseph F. Holt, 73, American politician, member of the United States House of Representatives (1953-1961).
- Alfredo Mury, 88, Guatemalan Olympic sports shooter (1952).
- Isaac Nicola, Cuban guitarist.
- George Rogge, 89, American football player (Chicago Cardinals).
- Polly Shackleton, 87, American politician.
- Hilda Watson, 75, Canadian politician.

=== 15 ===
- Gordie Bruce, 78, Canadian ice hockey player (Boston Bruins).
- Alan J. Charig, 70, English palaeontologist, stroke.
- Dick Chorovich, 64, American gridiron football player (Baltimore Colts, Los Angeles Chargers).
- Cheryl Glass, 35, American racing driver, suicide by jumping.
- Eve Greene, 91, American screenwriter.
- Rosamund Greenwood, 90, British actress.
- Justinas Lagunavičius, 72, Soviet Lithuanian basketball player and Olympian (1952).
- Stefan Marinov, 66, Bulgarian physicist, suicide by jumping.
- László Tharnói-Kostyál, 85, Hungarian writer.
- John Tripson, 77, American football player (Detroit Lions).
- Gianni Versace, 50, Italian fashion designer and founder of the Versace fashion house, shot.

=== 16 ===
- Ron Berry, 77, Welsh author and novelist.
- Rube Fischer, 80, American baseball player (New York Giants).
- Dora Maar, 89, French photographer, painter, and poet.
- William H. Reynolds, 87, American film editor (The Godfather, The Sound of Music, The Sting), Oscar winner (1966, 1974), cancer.
- Franciszek Sulik, 88-89, Polish-Australian chess master.

=== 17 ===
- Bianco Bianchi, 80, Italian Olympic cyclist (1936).
- Don Bingham, 67, American gridiron football player (Chicago Bears).
- R. Krishnan, 87, Indian film director.
- Thomas Mellon Evans, 86, American financier, complications following a fall.
- Arthur Jepson, 82, English cricket player.
- Hugo Gunckel Lüer, 95, Chilean pharmacist and botanist.
- Bob Mitchell, 75, American football player (Los Angeles Dons).
- Dave Peterson, 66, American ice hockey coach
- Birgitte Price, 63, Danish actress.
- Gene Warren, 80, American visual effects artist (The Time Machine) and television producer (Land of the Lost), Oscar winner (1961), cancer.
- Robert C. Weaver, 89, American economist and academic.

=== 18 ===
- André Drobecq, 96, French racing cyclist.
- Léon Gaultier, 82, French nazi collaborator during World War II and founding member of Front National.
- James Goldsmith, 64, Anglo-French financier, tycoon, and politician, pancreatic cancer.
- Igor Linchevski, Russian botanist.
- Angelo Polledri, 93, Italian rower and Olympian (1928).
- Oddvar Richardsen, 60, Norwegian football player and manager.
- Eugene Merle Shoemaker, 69, American geologist and planetary science pioneer, traffic collision.
- Harold Spina, 91, American composer of popular songs.
- Gregorio Weber, 81, Argentinian biochemist.

=== 19 ===
- Basil Bretherton, 80, Australian rules footballer.
- Frank Farrell, 50, British rock musician (Supertramp).
- Roy Finlayson, 88, Australian rules footballer.
- Hec Gervais, 63, Canadian curler.
- John E. Hines, 86, American Episcopal Church bishop.
- Harry Jones, 85, Australian rules footballer.
- Jim Peebles, 76, American football player (Washington Redskins).
- Tugolbay Sydykbekov, 85, Kyrgyzstani writer.
- James Goldsmith, 64, leader of the Referendum Party.

=== 20 ===
- Puneet Nath Datt, 24, Indian Army officer, killed in action.
- Alf Engen, 88, Norwegian-American skier.
- Ed Klewicki, 85, American football player (Detroit Lions).
- M. E. H. Maharoof, 58, Sri Lankan politician, gunshot wounds.
- Drummond Matthews, 66, British marine geologist and geophysicist.
- Cliff McWatt, 75, West Indian cricketer.
- Eric Charles Milner, 69, Canadian mathematician.
- Arshi Pipa, 76, Albanian-American philosopher, writer and poet.
- Linda Stirling, 75, American showgirl, model, and actress, cancer.

=== 21 ===
- Sjaak Alberts, 71, Dutch football player and Olympian (1952).
- Tony Alvarez, 40, Spanish Australian actor and singer, AIDS-related cancer.
- Paul K. Benedict, 85, American anthropologist and linguist, traffic collision.
- Roger Bowman, 69, American baseball player (New York Giants, Pittsburgh Pirates).
- Ellis V. Eichman, 84, American aircraft designer, plane crash.
- Růžena Grebeníčková, 71, Czech literary historian and theorist.
- Hjalmar Kelin, 96, Finnish footballer.
- Ernst Majonica, 76, German politician (CDU).
- Eusebio Ojeda, 84, Chilean Olympic rower (1956).

=== 22 ===
- Khalil Ahmed, 61, Pakistani composer.
- Irving Geis, 88, American artist.
- Vincent Hanna, 57, Northern Irish television journalist, heart attack.
- Jean-Jacques Herbulot, 88, French sailor and Olympian (1932, 1936, 1948, 1956).
- Kevin Howley, 73, English football referee.
- János Mogyorósi-Klencs, 75, Hungarian gymnast and Olympian (1948, 1952).
- Sondra Rodgers, 94, American actress.
- Fritz Scheller, 82, German Olympic cyclist (1936).
- Alf Svendsrud, 75, Norwegian footballer.

=== 23 ===
- Walter Behrendt, 82, German politician.
- Norman William Black, 65, American district judge (United States District Court for the Southern District of Texas).
- Jeff Cross, 78, American baseball player (St. Louis Cardinals, Chicago Cubs).
- Andrew Cunanan, 27, American spree killer and murderer of Gianni Versace, suicide by gunshot.
- Dequinha, 69, Brazilian football player.
- Andrea Domburg, 74, Dutch actress.
- Chūhei Nambu, 93, Japanese track and field athlete and Olympian (1928, 1932), pneumonia.
- Simon Pierre Tchoungui, 80, First Prime Minister of Cameroon.
- David Warbeck, 55, New Zealand actor and model, cancer.

=== 24 ===
- William J. Brennan, 91, Associate Justice of the Supreme Court of the United States (1956–1990).
- Fred Burton, 79, Australian rules footballer.
- Bob Gaddy, 73, American East Coast blues and R&B pianist, singer and songwriter, lung cancer.
- Edward Gardère, 88, French Olympian fencer (1932, 1936).
- Brian Glover, 63, English actor (Alien 3, Kes, An American Werewolf in London) and writer, brain tumor, brain cancer.
- László Görög, 93, Hungarian-American screenwriter.
- Saw Maung, 69, Burmese army general and statesman, heart attack.
- Frank Parker, 81, American tennis player.
- Bill Shine, 85, British actor.

=== 25 ===
- Natallia Arsiennieva, 93, Belarusian playwright, poet and translator.
- Jack Bickham, 66, American novelist, lymphoma.
- Peter Carmichael, 73, British fighter pilot during World War II and the Korean War.
- Jack Davies, 80, New Zealand swimmer.
- George Alexander Gale, 91, Canadian jurist, chief justice of Ontario.
- Ralph Goldstein, 83, American épée fencer and Olympian (1948, 1956), traffic collision.
- Ben Hogan, 84, American golf champion.
- Nicolae Ionescu, 48, Romanian footballer.
- David McFaull, 48, American Olympic sailor (1976).
- Boris Novikov, 72, Soviet actor, complications from diabetes.
- Matiu Rata, 63, New Zealand Māori politician, traffic collision.

=== 26 ===
- Jaime Milans del Bosch, 82, Spanish lieutenant general and co-leader of 1981 coup d'état, brain tumor.
- Hardin Cathey, 78, American baseball player (Washington Senators).
- Rolf Julin, 79, Swedish Olympic water polo player (1948).
- Kunihiko Kodaira, 82, Japanese mathematician.
- Bob Nussbaumer, 73, American gridiron football player (Green Bay Packers, Washington Redskins, Chicago Cardinals).
- Denis Smallwood, 78, British Royal Air Force senior commander.

=== 27 ===
- Muhammad Mahdi Al-Jawahiri, 98, Iraqi poet.
- Allan Broadway, 75, Australian rules footballer.
- Isabel Dean, 79, English actress.
- Clarkson Sherman Fisher, 76, American district judge (United States District Court for the District of New Jersey).
- Heinrich Liebe, 89, German naval officer during World War II.
- René Persillon, 78, French football player and Olympian (1948, 1952).
- K'tut Tantri, 99, Scottish American hotelier and broadcaster known as "Surabaya Sue".

=== 28 ===
- Rosalie Crutchley, 77, British actress.
- John FitzPatrick, 82, Australian politician.
- Bud Hardin, 75, American baseball player.
- Leo Loudenslager, 53, American aviator, traffic collision.
- Gordon McMaster, 37, Scottish politician, suicide by carbon monoxide poisoning.
- Seni Pramoj, 92, Thai politician and Prime Minister, heart disease and kidney failure.

=== 29 ===
- Jack Archer, 75, English sprinter and Olympian (1948).
- Bill Borwick, 83, Australian rules footballer.
- Mykhailo Byelykh, 38, Soviet/Ukrainian football player and a coach, traffic collision.
- Bud Hardin, 75, American baseball player (Chicago Cubs).
- Shinsaku Himeda, 80, Japanese cinematographer (Tora! Tora! Tora!).
- Edward A. Kawānanakoa, 72, American member of the Hawaiian House of Kawānanakoa.
- John Murphy, 78, Australian Olympic sports shooter (1964).
- John H. Ware III, 88, American politician, member of the United States House of Representatives (1970-1975).
- Chuck Wayne, 74, American jazz guitarist.

=== 30 ===
- Giuseppe Anedda, 85, Italian mandolin player.
- Robert Bryce, 87, Canadian civil servant.
- Emil J. Husak, 66, American politician.
- Charlotte van Pallandt, 98, Dutch painter and sculptor.

=== 31 ===
- Bảo Đại, 83, Vietnamese emperor of the Nguyễn dynasty, brain cancer.
- Hepi Te Heuheu, 78, New Zealand Māori chief.
- Frank Albert Kaufman, 81, American district judge (United States District Court for the District of Maryland).
- Vichit Kounavudhi, 75, Thai film director and screenwriter.
- Eddie Miller, 80, American baseball player.
- Vern Riffe, 72, American politician and speaker.
- Frans Schoubben, 63, Belgian racing cyclist.
