= Deaths in December 1997 =

The following is a list of notable deaths in December 1997.

Entries for each day are listed alphabetically by surname. A typical entry lists information in the following sequence:

- Name, age, country of citizenship at birth, subsequent country of citizenship (if applicable), reason for notability, cause of death (if known), and reference.

== December 1997 ==
=== 1 ===
- Julius Barnathan, 70, American broadcast engineer, lung cancer.
- Stéphane Grappelli, 89, French-Italian jazz violinist.
- Alex McGregor, 89, Australian rules footballer.
- Władysław Młynek, 67, Polish teacher, writer and poet.
- Jiří Pleskot, 75, Czech actor.
- Khan Ataur Rahman, 68, Bangladeshi film actor, director, and singer.
- Edwin Rosario, 34, Puerto Rican boxer, aneurysm.

=== 2 ===
- Guido Brunner, 67, Spanish-German diplomat and politician.
- Silvio Ceccato, 83, Italian philosopher and linguist.
- Shirley Crabtree, 67, British wrestler known as Big Daddy, stroke.
- Anat Elimelech, 23, Israeli model and actress, shot.
- Harald Gelhaus, 82, German U-boat commander during World War II.
- Robert A. Hall, 86, American linguist.
- Steve Hamilton, 63, American basketball player, colon cancer.
- Michael Hedges, 43, American composer, guitarist and singer-songwriter, traffic collision.
- Marge Kotlisky, 70, American actress (Major League, Thief, Sixteen Candles).
- Endicott Peabody, 77, American gridiron football player and politician, leukemia.
- Robert E. Williams, 61, American murderer, execution by electrocution.

=== 3 ===
- Stan Anderson, 58, Scottish football player.
- Domenico Enrici, 88, Italian prelate of the Catholic Church.
- Benito Jacovitti, 74, Italian comic artist.
- Vic Lombardi, 75, American Major League Baseball player (Brooklyn Dodgers, Pittsburgh Pirates).
- Olaf Pedersen, 77, Danish historian of science.

=== 4 ===
- Leo August, 83, American philatelist.
- Morton Bard, 73, American psychologist and author of The Crime Victim's Book.
- Buck Barry, 80, American actor and radio and television personality.
- Joe Brown, 71, American boxer.
- Ho Sin Hang, 97, Hong Kong entrepreneur and philanthropist.
- G. S. Jayanath, Sri Lankan army officer, killed in action.
- Vytautas Kazimieras Jonynas, 90, Lithuanian artist.
- Alberto Manzi, 73, Italian school teacher, writer and television host.
- K. A. Nizami, 71, Indian historian and diplomat.
- Pepper Sharpe, 78, American baseball player.
- Richard Vernon, 72, English actor (Goldfinger, Gandhi, The Man in Room 17), complications from Parkinson's disease.
- Joseph Wolpe, 82, South African psychiatrist.

=== 5 ===
- Rudolf Bahro, 62, East Germany dissident and politician, cancer.
- Forrest Burmeister, 84, American gridiron football player (Cleveland Rams).
- Eugen Cicero, 57, Romanian-German jazz pianist.
- Frederick Dainton, Baron Dainton, 83, British academic chemist.
- Ali Forney, 22, American gay and transgender youth, shot.
- Lutz Hoffmann, 38, East German gymnast and Olympic silver medalist (1980), suicide.
- John E. Moss, 82, American politician, member of the United States House of Representatives (1953-1978).
- Jakob Sverdrup, 78, Norwegian historian.
- Jan Voigt, 69, Norwegian actor, dancer and museum director.

=== 6 ===
- Bob Adkins, 80, American football player (Green Bay Packers).
- George Chisholm, 82, Scottish jazz trombonist and vocalist.
- Lou Clinton, 60, American baseball player, pneumonia.
- Eliot Daniel, 89, American songwriter and lyricist.
- Gilbert Delahaye, 74, Belgian author (Martine).
- Willy den Ouden, 79, Dutch swimmer and Olympic champion (1932, 1936).
- Jagmohan Kaur, 49, Indian singer and actress.
- Peter Leventritt, 82, American bridge player.
- Eddie Myers, 91, British Army officer and author.
- Willie Pastrano, 62, American boxer, liver cancer.
- Chris Walder, 97, Dutch footballer.

=== 7 ===
- Billy Bremner, 54, Scottish footballer and manager, suspected heart attack.
- Barry S. Brook, 81, American musicologist.
- Félix Candela, 87, Spanish architect.
- Torbjörn Caspersson, 87, Swedish cytologist and geneticist.
- Fernand Cornez, 90, French road bicycle racer.
- Karl August Folkers, 91, American biochemist.
- George R. Gardiner, 80, Canadian businessman and philanthropist.
- Armando Valente, 94, Italian racewalker and Olympian (1924).
- Annette B. Weiner, 64, American anthropologist.
- Woodrow Wyatt, 79, British politician, author and journalist.

=== 8 ===
- Bob Bell, 75, American actor famous for his alter-ego, Bozo the Clown.
- Walter Molino, 82, Italian comics artist and illustrator.
- Léon Poliakov, 87, French historian.
- Carlos Rafael Rodríguez, 84, Cuban communist politician, Parkinson's disease.
- Laurean Rugambwa, 85, Tanzanian cardinal of the Roman Catholic Church.
- Bob Tanner, 90, American football player (Frankford Yellow Jackets).
- Stephen Tredre, 34, English actor and writer, bone cancer.
- Shehu Musa Yar'Adua, 54, Nigerian army general, politician and Vice President.

=== 9 ===
- Tamara Geva, 91, Russian-American actress, ballet dancer, and choreographer.
- Angelo Herndon, 84, American labor organizer.
- K. Shivaram Karanth, 95, Indian polymath.
- Michael Lee Lockhart, 37, American convicted serial killer, execution by lethal injection.
- Keith W. Piper, 76, American football coach, congestive heart failure.
- Stefano Ludovico Straneo, 95, Italian entomologist and author.
- John D. Winters, 80, American historian.

=== 10 ===
- Luis Bagnato, 73, Argentine footballer.
- Anatoliy Banishevskiy, 51, Azerbaijani football player, diabetic coma attack.
- Kalmen Kaplansky, 85, Canadian human rights and trade union activist.
- Ken Keller, 63, American football player (Philadelphia Eagles).
- Yevgeni Mayorov, 59, Soviet ice hockey player and Olympian (1964), A.L.S.
- Eve McVeagh, 78, American actress (High Noon, The Clear Horizon, The Glass Web).

=== 11 ===
- Roger Brown, 72, American social psychologist.
- Eddie Chapman, 83, English criminal and spy during World War II.
- Robert Cosmoc, 66, Romanian footballer.
- Jorge Castañeda y Álvarez de la Rosa, 76, Mexican diplomat.
- Simon Jeffes, 48, English classical guitarist, composer and arranger, brain tumor, brain cancer.
- Paul Scull, 90, American football player.
- Harold Madison Wright, 89, Canadian engineer and Olympic sprinter (1932).

=== 12 ===
- Jim Bob Altizer, 65, American calf and steer roper.
- R. Stanton Avery, 90, American inventor.
- Wacław Gajewski, 86, Polish geneticist.
- Brian Deneke, 19, American punk musician, homicide by vehicular impact.
- Evgenii Landis, 76, Soviet and Russian mathematician.
- M. G. Soman, 53, Indian Air Force officer and actor.

=== 13 ===
- Giovanni Alberto Agnelli, 33, Italian businessman and member of the Agnelli family, stomach cancer.
- Martin Carter, 70, Guyanese poet and political activist.
- Paddy DeMarco, 69, American lightweight boxer.
- Don Edward Fehrenbacher, 77, American historian and Pulitzer Prize winner.
- Harry Glaß, 67, German ski jumper and Olympian (1956).
- Gran Harrison, 80, American football player (Philadelphia Eagles, Detroit Lions).
- Harry Lippiatt, 79, Australian rules footballer.
- Jimmy Milne, 86, Scottish football player and manager.
- W. D. Mochtar, 69, Indonesian actor.
- David Nicholson, 93, Australian politician.
- Alexander Oppenheim, 94, British mathematician.
- Georges Rose, 87, French footballer.
- David Rousset, 85, French writer and political activist.
- Claude Roy, 82, French poet and essayist, cancer.

=== 14 ===
- John Adair, 84, American anthropologist.
- Owen Barfield, 99, British philosopher, author, critic, and member of the Inklings.
- Frank Baumholtz, 79, American baseball and basketball player (Cincinnati Reds, Chicago Cubs, Philadelphia Phillies).
- Marion Bell, 78, American singer and musical theatre performer.
- Leola Brody, 75, American baseball player.
- Teodoro Goliardi, 70, Uruguayan fencer and Olympian (1956, 1960).
- Gerald Legge, 9th Earl of Dartmouth, 73, British peer and businessman.
- Stubby Kaye, 79, American actor (Guys and Dolls, Cat Ballou), comedian and singer, lung cancer.
- Edna F. Kelly, 91, American politician, member of the United States House of Representatives (1949-1969).
- Nico Lutkeveld, 81, Dutch javelin thrower and Olympian (1948).
- Emily Cheney Neville, 77, American author.
- Torsten Nilsson, 92, American politician.
- Kurt Winter, 51, Canadian guitarist and songwriter, kidney failure.

=== 15 ===
- Karsten Andersen, 77, Norwegian conductor.
- Cosmo Campoli, 74, American sculptor.
- Siegfried Flügge, 85, German theoretical physicist.
- Albert Heremans, 91, Belgian football player.
- Amin Ahsan Islahi, 93, Pakistani Muslim scholar.
- Borislav Mihajlović Mihiz, 75, Serbian writer and literary critic.
- Aleksandar Strain, 78, Croatian Olympic cyclist (1948).

=== 16 ===
- Lillian Disney, 98, American ink artist and wife of Walt Disney, stroke.
- Ralph Fasanella, 84, American painter.
- Kim Hak-sun, 73, Korean human rights activist.
- Oksana Ivanenko, 91, Soviet and Ukrainian children's writer and translator.
- Nicolette Larson, 45, American pop singer, cerebral edema.
- David L. McDonald, 91, American admiral, Chief of Naval Operations.
- Hu Ning, 81, Chinese physicist and writer.
- José Pi, 65, Spanish Olympic sailor (1960).
- William A. Smalley, 74, American linguist, heart attack.
- Frans Stafleu, 76, Dutch botanist.
- Richard Warwick, 52, English actor, AIDS-related complications.

=== 17 ===
- Juan Francisco Barraza, 62, Salvadoran football player and manager, cardiac problems.
- Paul Bindrim, 77, American psychotherapist.
- Ernest Bromley, 85, American minister and civil rights activist.
- Katharine Fowler-Billings, 95, American writer, naturalist, and geologist.
- Reginald Victor Jones, 86, British physicist and scientific military intelligence expert.
- Karl Kainberger, 85, Austrian Olympic football player (1936).
- Marie Gudme Leth, 102, Danish textile printer.
- Mel Mazzera, 83, American baseball player (St. Louis Browns, Philadelphia Phillies).
- Uzi Narkiss, 72, Israeli general.
- Peter Taylor, 75, English film editor (The Bridge on the River Kwai, Summertime, The Taming of the Shrew), Oscar winner (1958).
- Leo Turner, 69, Australian rules football player.
- Hanna Walz, 79, German politician.

=== 18 ===
- Lennart Andersson, 83, Swedish athlete and Olympian (1936).
- Ted Bond, 93, American baseball player.
- Geoff Campion, 81, British comics artist.
- Chris Farley, 33, American comedian and actor (Saturday Night Live, Tommy Boy, Black Sheep), drug overdose.
- Harriet Holter, 75, Norwegian social psychologist.
- Michel Quoist, 76, French catholic priest, theologian and writer, pancreatic cancer.
- George Tsutakawa, 87, American painter and sculptor.
- James Kemsey Wilkinson, founder of Wilko.
- Kasino Hadiwibowo, 47, Indonesian comedian and actor, a member of Warkop DKI, brain tumor.

=== 19 ===
- Michael Alldredge, 56, American actor (Scarface, Iron Eagle, Shoot the Moon).
- Siegfried Barth, 81, German Luftwaffe bomber pilot during World War.
- David Bradley, 77, American motion picture director and actor.
- Jack Bruen, 48, American basketball coach, cancer.
- Bonny Hicks, 29, Singaporean model and writer, plane crash.
- Sara Northrup Hollister, 73, American occultist and second wife of author L. Ron Hubbard.
- Masaru Ibuka, 89, Japanese electronics industrialist and co-founder of Sony, heart failure.
- Patsy Lawlor, 64, Irish businesswoman and politician.
- Jimmy Rogers, 73, American blues musician, colon cancer.
- David Schramm, 52, American astrophysicist, plane crash.
- Fyodor Simashev, 52, Soviet Russian cross-country skier and Olympian (1968, 1972).
- Uldis Ģērmanis, 82, Latvian historian, writer and publicist.

=== 20 ===
- Jim Gibbons, 73, Irish politician.
- Richard Glazar, 77, Czech-Jewish Holocaust survivor, suicide by self-defenestration.
- Jūzō Itami, 64, Japanese actor, screenwriter and film director, suicide by jumping.
- Wenceslas Kalibushi, 78, Rwandan Catholic bishop.
- Denise Levertov, 74, American poet, lymphoma.
- Esko Lyytikkä, 68, Finnish Olympic rower (1952).
- Hugh McMahon, 91, Scottish footballer.
- Esther Peterson, 91, American consumer and women's advocate.
- Dick Spooner, 77, English cricket player.
- Dawn Steel, 51, American film studio executive and producer (Cool Runnings, Sister Act 2: Back in the Habit, Honey, I Blew Up the Kid), brain cancer.

=== 21 ===
- Joseph Ahrens, 94, German composer and organist.
- Roger Barkley, 61, American radio personality, pancreatic cancer.
- Blai Bonet, 71, Spanish poet, novelist and art critic.
- Johnny Coles, 71, American jazz trumpeter, cancer.
- Amie Comeaux, 21, American country music singer, traffic collision.
- Igor Dmitriev, 56, Russian ice hockey player and coach.
- Sacco van der Made, 79, Dutch actor.
- Jerry Masucci, 63, American attorney and businessman.
- Roxbee Cox, Baron Kings Norton, 95, British aeronautical engineer.
- Sholom Schwadron, Israeli Haredi rabbi and orator.
- Józef Stefański, 89, Polish cyclist and Olympian (1928).
- Bruce Woodcock, 76, English boxer.

=== 22 ===
- Sebastian Arcos Bergnes, 66, Cuban human rights activist.
- Flea Clifton, 89, American baseball player (Detroit Tigers).
- Francis Haar, 89, Hungarian socio-photographer.
- José Oliva, 26, Dominican baseball player (Atlanta Braves, St. Louis Cardinals), traffic collision.
- Hal Rice, 73, American baseball player (St. Louis Cardinals, Pittsburgh Pirates, Chicago Cubs).
- Stillman Rouse, 80, American football player (Detroit Lions).
- Clara Lee Tanner, 92, American anthropologist and art historian.

=== 23 ===
- Felix Bwalya, 30, Zambian boxer and Olympian (1992), head injuries sustained in a boxing fight.
- Stanley Cortez, 89, American cinematographer, heart attack.
- Bill Dickie, 81, Canadian chemist and ice hockey player (Chicago Black Hawks).
- Les Harrison, 93, American basketball player and coach (Rochester Royals).
- Zaur Kaloyev, 66, Soviet and Georgian football player.
- Thomas S. Moorman, 87, United States Air Force officer.
- Kārlis Paegle, 86, Latvian sportsman and Olympian (1936).
- Fred Page, 82, Canadian ice hockey referee and administrator.
- Paula Stone, 85, American actress.

=== 24 ===
- Fahd Ballan, 64, Syrian druze singer and actor.
- Jacques Fabbri, 72, French actor.
- Vic Feller, 74, Luxembourgish Olympic football player (1948).
- Kemper Goodwin, 91, American architect.
- Harry Groves, 79, English boxer.
- Andy Kerr, 66, Scottish football player.
- Charles Roman Koester, 82, American prelate of the Catholic Church.
- James Komack, 73, American television producer and writer (The Courtship of Eddie's Father, Chico and the Man, Welcome Back, Kotter), heart failure.
- Toshiro Mifune, 77, Japanese actor (Rashomon, Seven Samurai, Throne of Blood), multiple organ failure.
- Lotte Motz, 75, Austrian-American scholar.

=== 25 ===
- Julio Alba, 75, Argentine cyclist and Olympian (1948).
- Anatoli Boukreev, 39, Russian and Kazakhstani mountaineer, avalanche.
- George Bryce, 82, Australian rules footballer.
- Anita Conti, 98, French explorer and photographer.
- Yvonne Cormeau, 88, British SOE agent during World War II.
- Georgi Gavasheli, 50, Soviet/Georgian football player.
- Myriam Marbe, 66, Romanian composer and pianist.
- Jerry March, 68, American organic chemist.
- Paul M. O'Leary, 96, American economist and educator.
- Denver Pyle, 77, American actor (The Dukes of Hazzard, Bonnie and Clyde, The Andy Griffith Show), lung cancer.
- Kenneth Spring, 76, British Army officer and artist.
- Giorgio Strehler, 76, Italian opera and theatre director, heart attack.

=== 26 ===
- Cahit Arf, 87, Turkish mathematician.
- Rajmund Badó, 95, Hungarian Olympic wrestler (1924, 1928).
- Cornelius Castoriadis, 75, Greek-French philosopher, social critic and economist, complications following heart surgery.
- Simone Duvalier, 84, First Lady of Haiti as wife of François "Papa Doc" Duvalier.
- John Hinde, 81, English photographer.
- Sergei Mamchur, 25, Russian football player, heart failure.
- Dale Milford, 71, American politician, member of the United States House of Representatives (1973-1979).
- Victor Oehrn, 90, German U-boat commander during World War II.
- Karlis Osis, 80, Latvian-American parapsychologist.
- Kenneth Pitzer, 83, American physical and theoretical chemist.
- Tommy Price, 86, British speedway rider.
- Mircea Veroiu, 56, Romanian film director and screenwriter.

=== 27 ===
- Ewart Abner, 74, American record company executive.
- Yousef Mohamed Alghoul, 61, Libyan football referee.
- Said Brahimi, 66, Algerian-French football player.
- Webster Chikabala, 32, Zambian football player, coach, and Olympian (1988), HIV/AIDS.
- Brendan Gill, 83, American journalist.
- Possum Jones, 63, American racing driver.
- George Mearns, 75, American basketball player (Providence Steamrollers).
- James Nabrit, Jr., 97, American civil rights attorney.
- Buxton Orr, 73, British composer and teacher.
- Dumitru Popescu, 55, Romanian footballer.
- Malayattoor Ramakrishnan, 70, Indian writer, cartoonist and lawyer.
- Kent Robbins, 50, American country music songwriter, traffic collision.
- Bess Whitehead Scott, 107, American journalist.
- Jesús Suárez, 85, Spanish Olympic skier (1936).
- Tamara Tyshkevich, 66, Soviet shot putter and Olympian (1952, 1956).
- Danny Wagner, 75, American basketball player (Sheboygan Red Skins).
- Dan Wagoner, 38, American football player (Detroit Lions, Minnesota Vikings, Atlanta Falcons).
- Billy Wright, 37, Northern Irish paramilitary leader, shot.

=== 28 ===
- Heikki A. Alikoski, 85, Finnish astronomer and discoverer of minor planets.
- Bill Anderson, 86, American producer, cerebral hemorrhage after falling.
- Shaikh Ayaz, 74, Pakistani poet, heart attack.
- Corneliu Baba, 91, Romanian painter.
- Henry Barraud, 97, French composer.
- Bob Bosustow, 63, Australian rules footballer.
- James Lees-Milne, 89, English writer and expert on country houses.
- William Martínez, 69, Uruguayan footballer.
- Steve Musseau, 74, American football coach and motivational speaker, heart failure.
- Dominic Pressley, 33, American basketball player (Washington Bullets, Chicago Bulls).
- Vassily Solomin, 44, Soviet and Russian boxer and Olympian (1972, 1976), lung cancer.
- Wacław Wójcik, 78, Polish racing cyclist.

=== 29 ===
- Ignácz Berecz, 85, Hungarian Olympic cross-country skier (1952).
- J. Richardson Dilworth, 81, American businessman.
- Helen Kirkpatrick, 88, American war correspondent during World War II.
- István Kiss, 70, Hungarian sculptor and politician.
- André Marchand, 90, French painter.
- Frank O'Connor, 74-75, Irish Olympic basketball player (1948).
- Robert Walter Steel, 82, British geographer.

=== 30 ===
- Danilo Dolci, 73, Italian social activist, sociologist and poet, heart attack.
- Raymond Ericson, 82, American music critic.
- Bernard Girard, 79, American screenwriter, producer and film director.
- Shinichi Hoshi, 71, Japanese novelist and science fiction writer.
- Warren Mehrtens, 77, American thoroughbred horse racing jockey.
- Bernard Soysa, 83, Sri Lankan politician.
- Kim Sun-ja, South Korean serial killer.
- John Howard Yoder, 70, American theologian and ethicist.

=== 31 ===
- Jim Chambers, 70, Canadian football player.
- Floyd Cramer, 64, American pianist, lung cancer.
- Dominique de Menil, 89, French-American art collector and philanthropist.
- Billie Dove, 94, American actress, pneumonia.
- Richard Elman, 63, American novelist, poet, and journalist.
- Michael LeMoyne Kennedy, 39, American lawyer, son of Robert F. Kennedy, skiing accident.
- Liu Lantao, 87, Chinese communist revolutionary and politician.
- Sandy McPeak, 61, American actor.
- Ken Olfson, 60, American actor.
- Ko Stijger, 82, Dutch footballer.
- Silvia Strukel, 81, Italian Olympic fencer (1952).
