= 1997 in film =

The year 1997 in film involved many major film events. Major releases this year included Titanic, The Full Monty, Gattaca, Liar Liar, Donnie Brasco, Good Will Hunting, Boogie Nights, L.A. Confidential, The Fifth Element, Nil by Mouth, and the beginning of the film studio DreamWorks.

== Highest-grossing films ==
The top 10 films released in 1997 by worldwide gross are as follows:

Highest-grossing films of 1997
Rank	Title	Distributor	Worldwide gross (USD)
1	Titanic	Paramount / 20th Century Fox	$1,843,201,268 (Note: Excluding the gross from subsequent re-releases.)
2	The Lost World: Jurassic Park	Universal	$618,638,999
3	Men in Black	Sony / Columbia	$589,390,539
4	Tomorrow Never Dies	MGM / UIP	$333,011,068
5	Air Force One	Sony / Columbia / Buena Vista	$315,156,409
6	As Good as It Gets	Sony / TriStar	$314,178,011
7	Liar Liar	Universal	$302,710,615
8	My Best Friend's Wedding	Sony / TriStar	$299,288,605
9	The Fifth Element	Sony / Columbia / Gaumont	$263,920,180
10	The Full Monty	Fox Searchlight	$257,938,649

=== Box office records ===
- Titanic became the first film in history to pass $1 billion at the box office on March 1, 1998. Titanic held the record for the highest-grossing film of all time for 12 years until it was surpassed by Avatar (also directed by James Cameron) on January 25, 2010.
- The Jurassic Park franchise became the sixth film franchise to gross $1 billion with the release of The Lost World: Jurassic Park.
- Sony Pictures became the year's highest-grossing distributor in the United States and Canada, with $1.3 billion in domestic gross. It was the first time Sony Pictures topped the domestic box office, after Disney was the top-grossing domestic distributor for the previous three years.
- Men in Black became the highest grossing none superhero comic book film of all time surpassing Timecop (1994).

== Events ==
- January-March – The Star Wars Special Editions, a theatrical anniversary edition of the original Star Wars trilogy, celebrating the 20th anniversary of the release of Star Wars: Episode IV – A New Hope, are released. The Special Editions would contain many new edits and scenes which would become the basis for all future releases of the trilogy.
- May 9 – The Fifth Element is released, becoming a global box office success. It will go on to become the top-grossing French film of all time, a record it will hold for 14 years until the release of The Intouchables in 2011.
- May 23 – The Lost World: Jurassic Park is released by Universal Pictures and scores the biggest opening weekend of all time, grossing a total of $90.1 million.
- July 2 – Men in Black is released by Columbia Pictures, thus launching the Men in Black trilogy.
- September 26 – DreamWorks Pictures' first film, The Peacemaker, is released.
- December 19 – James Cameron's epic historical romance film Titanic, which would later go on to be the first film to gross $1 billion at the worldwide box office, opens in theaters.

Academy Awards

Golden Globe Awards

Palme d'Or (Cannes Film Festival):

Taste of Cherry (طعم گيلاس, Ta'm-e gilass), directed by Abbas Kiarostami, Iran / France
The Eel (うなぎ, Unagi), directed by Shohei Imamura, Japan

Golden Lion (Venice Film Festival):

Hana-bi (Fireworks), directed by Takeshi Kitano, Japan

Golden Bear (Berlin Film Festival):

The People vs. Larry Flynt, directed by Miloš Forman, Canada / United States

People's Choice Award (Toronto International Film Festival):

The Hanging Garden, directed by Thom Fitzgerald, Canada

=== Award ceremonies ===
- 2nd Empire Awards
- 24th Saturn Awards

== Awards ==
Category/Organization	55th Golden Globe Awards January 18, 1998		3rd Critics' Choice Awards January 20, 1998	Producers, Directors, Screen Actors, and Writers Guild Awards	70th Academy Awards March 23, 1998	51st BAFTA Awards April 18, 1998
Category/Organization	Drama	Musical or Comedy	3rd Critics' Choice Awards January 20, 1998	Producers, Directors, Screen Actors, and Writers Guild Awards	70th Academy Awards March 23, 1998	51st BAFTA Awards April 18, 1998
Best Film	Titanic	As Good as It Gets	L.A. Confidential	Titanic		The Full Monty
Best Director	James Cameron; Titanic					Baz Luhrmann; Romeo + Juliet
Best Actor	Peter Fonda; Ulee's Gold	Jack Nicholson; As Good as It Gets				Robert Carlyle; The Full Monty
Best Actress	Judi Dench; Mrs Brown	Helen Hunt; As Good as It Gets	Helena Bonham Carter; The Wings of the Dove	Helen Hunt; As Good as It Gets		Judi Dench; Mrs Brown
Best Supporting Actor	Burt Reynolds; Boogie Nights		Anthony Hopkins; Amistad	Robin Williams; Good Will Hunting		Tom Wilkinson; The Full Monty
Best Supporting Actress	Kim Basinger; L.A. Confidential		Joan Cusack; In & Out	Kim Basinger; L.A. Confidential; Gloria Stuart; Titanic	Kim Basinger; L.A. Confidential	Sigourney Weaver; The Ice Storm
Best Screenplay, Adapted	Good Will Hunting; Ben Affleck and Matt Damon		L.A. Confidential; Brian Helgeland and Curtis Hanson			Romeo + Juliet; Baz Luhrmann and Craig Pearce
Best Screenplay, Original	Good Will Hunting; Ben Affleck and Matt Damon		Good Will Hunting; Ben Affleck and Matt Damon	Mark Andrus and James L. Brooks; As Good As It Gets	Good Will Hunting; Ben Affleck and Matt Damon	Nil by Mouth; Gary Oldman
Best Original Score	Titanic; James Horner		N/A	N/A	Titanic; James Horner	Romeo + Juliet; Nellee Hooper
Best Original Song	"My Heart Will Go On"; Titanic		N/A	N/A	"My Heart Will Go On"; Titanic	N/A
Best Foreign Language Film	My Life in Pink		Shall We Dance?	N/A	Character	Ridicule

== 1997 films ==
=== By country/region ===
- List of American films of 1997
- List of Argentine films of 1997
- List of Australian films of 1997
- List of Bangladeshi films of 1997
- List of British films of 1997
- List of Canadian films of 1997
- List of French films of 1997
- List of Hong Kong films of 1997
- List of Indian films of 1997
  - List of Hindi films of 1997
  - List of Kannada films of 1997
  - List of Malayalam films of 1997
  - List of Marathi films of 1997
  - List of Tamil films of 1997
  - List of Telugu films of 1997
- List of Japanese films of 1997
- List of Mexican films of 1997
- List of Pakistani films of 1997
- List of Russian films of 1997
- List of South Korean films of 1997
- List of Spanish films of 1997

=== By genre/medium ===
- List of action films of 1997
- List of animated feature films of 1997
- List of avant-garde films of 1997
- List of crime films of 1997
- List of comedy films of 1997
- List of drama films of 1997
- List of horror films of 1997
- List of science fiction films of 1997
- List of thriller films of 1997
- List of western films of 1997

== Births ==
- January 2 – Melis Sezen, Turkish actress
- January 17 – Jake Paul, American YouTuber, actor and boxer
- January 21 – Jeremy Shada, American actor and musician
- January 24
  - Jonah Bobo, American actor
  - Dylan Riley Snyder, American actor
- February 2 – Ellie Bamber, English actress
- February 8
  - Kathryn Newton, American actress
  - Quintessa Swindell, American actor
- February 10 – Chloë Grace Moretz, American actress
- February 12 – Shane Baumel, American former teen actor
- February 14 – Madison Iseman, American actress
- February 23 – Pallavi Dey, Indian actress (d. 2022)
- February 25 – Isabelle Fuhrman, American actress
- March 2 – Becky G, American singer and actress
- March 3 – Camila Cabello, Cuban singer and actress
- March 6 – Alisha Boe, Norwegian-American actress
- March 9 – Niamh Wilson, Canadian actress
- March 10 – Madeleine Arthur, Canadian actress
- March 18 – Ciara Bravo, American actress
- March 28 – Annabelle Davis, English actress
- April 1 – Asa Butterfield, English actor
- April 5 – Henry Hunter Hall, American actor
- April 15
  - Toheeb Jimoh, English actor
  - Maisie Williams, English actress
- April 19 - Kaitlyn Santa Juana, Canadian actress and singer
- April 23 – Alex Ferris, Canadian actor
- April 25 – Tony Poljan, American Football Player
- April 26 – Amber Midthunder, American actress
- May 2 – Perla Haney-Jardine, Brazilian-American actress
- May 11 – Lana Condor, American actress
- May 12 – Odeya Rush, Israeli actress
- May 24 - Aysha Joy Samuel, German actress
- May 30
  - Zoe Renee, American actress
  - Jake Short, American actor
- June 3 – Alison Oliver, Irish actress
- June 13 – Theodore Pellerin, Canadian actor
- June 16 – Camila Morrone, American model and actress
- June 17 – KJ Apa, New Zealand actor
- June 18 – Max Records, American actor
- June 19 – Molly Windsor, English actress
- June 21 – Sam Buchanan, English actor
- June 26 – Jacob Elordi, Australian actor
- July 13 – Leo Howard, American actor and martial artist
- July 18 – Fionn Whitehead, British actor
- July 19 – Amita Suman, Nepali-British actress
- July 22 – Field Cate, American actor
- July 23 – Chloé Hayden, Australian actress
- August 5
  - Olivia Holt, American actress and singer
  - Adam Irigoyen, American actor
- August 13 – Yeo Jin-goo, South Korean actor
- August 18 – Josephine Langford, Australian actress
- August 25
  - Holly Gibbs, English child actress
  - Bryana Salaz, American actress and singer
- August 28 – Emilia McCarthy, Canadian actress
- August 30 – Dana Gaier, American actress
- September 7 – Dean-Charles Chapman, English actor
- September 9 – Tallulah Haddon, British actress
- September 11 – Michelle Randolph, American actress
- September 12 – Sydney Sweeney, American actress
- September 16 – Elena Kampouris, American actress
- September 19 – Jayme Lawson, American actress
- September 30 – Havana Rose Liu, American actress, model, dancer, activist and designer
- October 6 – Honor Swinton Byrne, British actress
- October 7 – Kira Kosarin, American actress
- October 8 – Bella Thorne, American actress
- October 10 – Grace Rolek, American actress and voice actress
- October 20 – John Bell, Scottish actor
- October 23 – Zach Callison, American actor and voice actor
- October 26 – Rhenzy Feliz, American actor and singer
- October 28 – Sierra McCormick, American actress
- November 1
  - Max Burkholder, American actor
  - Alex Wolff, American actor and musician
- November 6 – Hero Fiennes Tiffin, English actor, model and producer
- November 8 – Dominique Thorne, American actress
- November 13 – Brent and Shane Kinsman, American twin child actors
- November 18 – Noah Ringer, American actor
- November 26
  - Aubrey Joseph, American actor and rapper
  - Luka Sabbat, American actor and model
- December 11
  - Ben Cook, American actor, singer and dancer
  - Taylor Hickson, Canadian actress
- December 15 – Maude Apatow, American actress
- December 16 – Spence Moore II, American actor
- December 27 – Vachirawit Chivaaree "Bright", Thai actor
- December 29 – Kiera Allen, American actress

== Deaths ==
Month	Date	Name	Age	Country	Profession	Notable films
January	1	Joan Rice	66	UK	Actress	The Steel Key; His Majesty O'Keefe
January	4	Bill Lancaster	49	US	Screenwriter	The Thing; The Bad News Bears
January	5	Burton Lane	84	US	Composer, Lyricist	Royal Wedding; On a Clear Day You Can See Forever
January	6	Catherine Scorsese	84	US	Actress	Goodfellas; The Godfather Part III
January	9	Jesse White	80	US	Actor	Harvey; It's a Mad, Mad, Mad, Mad World
January	10	Sheldon Leonard	89	US	Actor, Director, Producer	It's a Wonderful Life; To Have and Have Not
January	18	Diana Lewis	77	US	Actress	Go West; It's a Gift
January	19	Adriana Caselotti	80	US	Actress	Snow White and the Seven Dwarfs; The Wizard of Oz
January	19	James Dickey	73	US	Screenwriter	Deliverance
January	19	Charles Nelson	95	Sweden	Film Editor	Picnic; The Big Heat
January	21	Marcello Danon	76	Bulgaria	Producer, Screenwriter	La Cage aux Folles; OSS 117 Is Unleashed
January	21	Polly Ann Young	88	US	Actress	The Man from Utah; The Crimson Trail
January	23	David Waller	76	UK	Actor	Lady Jane; The Secret Garden
January	23	Bill Zuckert	81	US	Actor	Ace Ventura: Pet Detective; Hang 'Em High
January	27	Bill Kennedy	88	US	Actor	Now, Voyager; Mr. Skeffington
January	27	Richard X. Slattery	71	US	Actor	The Boston Strangler; Herbie Rides Again
January	31	Eve Lister	83	UK	Actress	Sweeney Todd: The Demon Barber of Fleet Street; No Limit
February	1	Marjorie Reynolds	79	US	Actress	Gone with the Wind; Holiday Inn
February	4	Robert Clouse	68	US	Director	Enter the Dragon; Ironheart
February	5	Harry Essex	86	US	Screenwriter, Director	Creature from the Black Lagoon; The Sons of Katie Elder
February	7	Mary Wills	82	US	Costume Designer	The Diary of Anne Frank; Cape Fear
February	8	Robert Ridgely	65	US	Actor	Philadelphia; Boogie Nights
February	11	Barry Evans	53	UK	Actor	Alfred the Great; Here We Go Round the Mulberry Bush
February	11	Don Porter	84	US	Actor	The Candidate; Mame
February	12	James Cossins	63	UK	Actor	The Man with the Golden Gun; Gandhi
February	19	Frank Delfino	86	US	Actor	Planet of the Apes; Willy Wonka & the Chocolate Factory
February	23	Frank Launder	91	UK	Screenwriter, Director	I See a Dark Stranger; Night Train to Munich
February	23	Oscar Lewenstein	80	UK	Producer	Tom Jones; The Bride Wore Black
February	25	Scott Forbes	76	UK	Actor	The Desert Fox: The Story of Rommel; Operation Pacific
February	25	Arthur Hewlett	89	UK	Actor	Man About the House; Little Dorrit
February	26	David Doyle	67	US	Actor	Capricorn One; Loving
February	26	Wende Wagner	55	US	Actress	Rosemary's Baby; Guns of the Magnificent Seven
March	4	Carey Loftin	83	US	Stuntman, Actor	The Deer Hunter; Patton
March	5	William Roberts	83	US	Screenwriter	The Magnificent Seven; The Last American Hero
March	8	Alexander Salkind	75	Poland	Producer	Superman; The Three Musketeers
March	9	Terry Nation	66	UK	Screenwriter	And Soon the Darkness; Dr. Who and the Daleks
March	13	Ronald Fraser	66	UK	Actor	The Flight of the Phoenix; The Wild Geese
March	14	Fred Zinnemann	89	Austria	Director, Producer	From Here to Eternity; High Noon
March	15	Gail Davis	71	US	Actress	Six Gun Mesa; The Far Frontier
March	16	Leda Gloria	84	Italy	Actress	Le Petit Monde de Don Camillo; Le Retour de Don Camillo
March	22	John Hoesli	78	UK	Art Director	The African Queen; 2001: A Space Odyssey
March	29	Ellen Pollock	94	UK	Actress	Piccadilly; Horror Hospital
March	30	Jack Bernhard	82	US	Director	Blonde Ice; Decoy
April	2	Anthony Bushell	92	UK	Actor	A Night to Remember; The Battle of the River Plate
April	2	Tomoyuki Tanaka	86	Japan	Producer	Godzilla; Kagemusha
April	4	Mike Raven	72	UK	Actor	Lust for a Vampire; I, Monster
April	6	Barbara Yu Ling	58	Singapore	Actress	The Satanic Rites of Dracula; Hardware
April	14	Michael Stroka	58	US	Actor	King Rat; House of Dark Shadows
April	15	David Dockendorf	73	US	Sound Engineer	Chinatown; Planet of the Apes
April	16	Roland Topor	59	France	Screenwriter, Actor	The Tenant; Fantastic Planet
April	20	Jean Louis	89	France	Costume Designer	The Caine Mutiny; A Star Is Born
April	24	Pat Paulsen	69	Mexico	Actor	Night Patrol; Harper Valley PTA
April	25	Brian May	62	Australia	Composer	Mad Max; Freddy's Dead: The Final Nightmare
April	26	John Beal	87	US	Actor	Alimony; My Six Convicts
April	26	Joey Faye	87	US	Actor	Top Banana; The Tender Trap
April	26	Neil Robinson	61	US	Actor	8½; Samson and Delilah
April	27	Gabriel Figueroa	90	Mexico	Cinematographer	Kelly's Heroes; The Exterminating Angel
April	27	Paul Lambert	74	US	Actor	Planet of the Apes; Spartacus
April	28	Steve Conte	77	Italy	Actor	The Onion Field; The Wild World of Batwoman
May	1	Bo Widerberg	66	Sweden	Director, Screenwriter	Raven's End; Elvira Madigan
May	3	Hughie Green	77	UK	Actor, Producer	Hills of Home; Tom Brown's School Days
May	4	Alvy Moore	75	US	Actor, Producer	A Boy and His Dog; 5 Against the House
May	5	Walter Gotell	73	Germany	Actor	James Bond; The Boys from Brazil
May	6	Jorge Martínez de Hoyos	76	Mexico	Actor	The Magnificent Seven; Cronos
May	9	Marco Ferreri	68	Italy	Director, Screenwriter	Dillinger Is Dead; La Grande Bouffe
May	9	Paul Zastupnevich	75	US	Costume Designer	The Towering Inferno; The Poseidon Adventure
May	10	John P. Austin	90	US	Set Decorator	Touch of Evil; Diamonds Are Forever
May	11	Catherine McLeod	75	US	Actress	I've Always Loved You; That's My Man
May	11	Howard Morton	71	US	Actor	The Mechanic; The Life and Times of Judge Roy Bean
May	14	Thelma Carpenter	75	US	Singer, Actress	The Wiz; The Cotton Club
May	15	Bridgette Andersen	21	US	Actress	Nightmares; Savannah Smiles
May	16	Giuseppe De Santis	80	Italy	Director, Screenwriter	Bitter Rice; Attack and Retreat
May	20	John Rawlins	94	US	Director, Film Editor	Dick Tracy's Dilemma; Fort Defiance
May	22	Renzo Montagnani	66	Italy	Actor	The Date; The Trade Unionist
May	23	Frances E. Nealy	78	US	Actress	Ghostbusters; WarGames
May	24	Edward Mulhare	74	Ireland	Actor	Von Ryan's Express; Out to Sea
May	28	Sydney Guilaroff	89	US	Makeup Artist	The Wizard of Oz; North by Northwest
May	29	George Fenneman	77	US	Actor	The Thing from Another World; Ocean's 11
June	14	Marjorie Best	94	US	Costume Designer	Rio Bravo; Giant
June	14	Richard Jaeckel	70	US	Actor	The Dirty Dozen; Sometimes a Great Notion
June	16	Elizabeth McBride	42	US	Costume Designer	Driving Miss Daisy; The Shawshank Redemption
June	17	Maurice Rootes	80	UK	Film Editor	Jason and the Argonauts; First Men in the Moon
June	19	Olga Georges-Picot	57	France	Actress	The Day of the Jackal; Love and Death
June	22	Don Henderson	65	UK	Actor	Star Wars; Brazil
June	23	Rosina Lawrence	84	Canada	Actress	Way Out West; The Great Ziegfeld
June	24	Brian Keith	75	US	Actor	The Parent Trap; Nevada Smith
June	25	Jacques Cousteau	87	France	Documentarian	The Silent World; World Without Sun
June	26	George Bassman	83	US	Composer, Orchestrator	The Wizard of Oz; Gone with the Wind
June	28	Gary DeVore	69	US	Screenwriter	The Dogs of War; Raw Deal
June	29	William Hickey	69	US	Actor	Prizzi's Honor; National Lampoon's Christmas Vacation
July	1	Robert Mitchum	79	US	Actor	Cape Fear; Out of the Past
July	2	James Stewart	89	US	Actor	It's a Wonderful Life; Mr. Smith Goes to Washington
July	9	Carol Forman	79	US	Actress	The Black Widow; The Feathered Serpent
July	15	Rosamund Greenwood	90	UK	Actress	Village of the Damned; The Witches
July	16	William Reynolds	87	US	Film Editor	The Godfather; The Sound of Music
July	17	Gene Warren	80	US	Visual Effects Artist	The Time Machine; Black Sunday
July	20	Linda Stirling	75	US	Actress	The Tiger Woman; The Mysterious Mr. Valentine
July	23	David Warbeck	55	New Zealand	Actor	Wolfshead: The Legend of Robin Hood; Duck, You Sucker!
July	24	Brian Glover	63	UK	Actor	Alien 3; An American Werewolf in London
July	27	Isabel Dean	79	UK	Actor	Oh! What a Lovely War; The Passionate Friends
July	28	Rosalie Crutchley	77	UK	Actress	Four Weddings and a Funeral; The Haunting
August	4	Dick Bush	65	UK	Cinematographer	Tommy; Victor Victoria
August	5	Don Steele	61	US	Actor	Gremlins; Grand Theft Auto
August	15	Glenn Corbett	74	US	Actor	Fixed Bayonets!; The Violent Years
August	18	Don Knight	64	UK	Actor	Swamp Thing; The Apple Dumpling Gang
August	18	Jeep Swenson	40	US	Actor	Batman & Robin; Bulletproof
August	19	Cathleen Cordell	82	US	Actress	MASH; The Return of the Living Dead
August	20	Leo Jaffe	88	US	Studio Executive	
August	25	Camilla Spira	81	Germany	Actor	Die Buntkarierten; Morgenrot
August	25	William H. Tuntke	90	Germany	Art Director, Production Designer	Mary Poppins; The Andromeda Strain
August	27	Sally Blane	87	US	Actress	I Am a Fugitive from a Chain Gang; The Sheik
August	27	Dick N. Lucas	77	US	Animator	The Jungle Book; One Hundred and One Dalmatians
August	27	Brandon Tartikoff	48	US	Studio Executive	
August	28	Eve Smith	91	US	Actress	Romancing the Stone; Star Trek IV: The Voyage Home
August	31	Dodi Fayed	42	Egypt	Producer	Hook; Chariots of Fire
August	31	Will Hare	81	US	Actor	Back to the Future; The Rose
September	5	Eddie Little Sky	71	US	Actor	A Man Called Horse; Paint Your Wagon
September	7	Elisabeth Brooks	46	Canada	Actress	The Howling; Family Plot
September	8	Helen Shaw	100	US	Actress	Parenthood; Twilight Zone: The Movie
September	9	Burgess Meredith	89	US	Actor	Rocky; Batman
September	13	Audrey Fildes	74	UK	Actress	Kind Hearts and Coronets; While I Live
September	13	Georges Guétary	82	France	Actor	An American in Paris; The Road to Paradise
September	16	Terence Cooper	64	Ireland	Actor	No Way Out; Casino Royale
September	16	Gerry Turpin	72	UK	Cinematographer	The Last of Sheila; Séance on a Wet Afternoon
September	17	Jerry Gershwin	71	US	Producer	Harper; Blood In Blood Out
September	17	Brian Hall	59	UK	Actor	The Long Good Friday; The Land That Time Forgot
September	17	Red Skelton	84	US	Actor, Comedian	DuBarry Was a Lady; The Fuller Brush Man
September	19	Jack May	75	UK	Actor	The Man Who Would Be King; The Bounty
September	21	Jennifer Holt	76	US	Actress	Stick to Your Guns; Gun Smoke
September	21	Maurice Kaufmann	70	UK	Actor	A Shot in the Dark; The Abominable Dr. Phibes
September	26	Dorothy Kingsley	87	US	Screenwriter	Angels in the Outfield; Valley of the Dolls
September	26	Samuel W. Taylor	90	US	Screenwriter	The Man with My Face; Bait
October	3	John Ashley	62	US	Actor, Producer	Muscle Beach Party; Young Dillinger
October	3	Verna Hillie	83	US	Actress	The Star Packer; The Trail Beyond
October	3	Jarl Kulle	70	Sweden	Actor, Director, Screenwriter	Fanny and Alexander; Babette's Feast
October	5	Andrew Keir	71	UK	Actor	Cleopatra; Rob Roy
October	5	Debbie Linden	36	UK	Actress	Eat the Rich; Bloodbath at the House of Death
October	9	Arch Johnson	75	US	Actor	The Sting; Niagara
October	10	Stella Bonheur	92	UK	Actress	The Roman Spring of Mrs. Stone; Intent to Kill
October	12	John Denver	53	US	Singer, Actor	Oh, God!; Fire and Ice
October	13	Joyce Compton	90	US	Actress	The Best Years of Our Lives; Mildred Pierce
October	14	Hy Averback	76	US	Director, Producer, Actor	I Love You, Alice B. Toklas; Where Were You When the Lights Went Out?
October	16	Audra Lindley	79	US	Actress	The Heartbreak Kid; Best Friends
October	17	Ben Welden	96	US	Actor	The Big Sleep; The Roaring Twenties
October	18	Milt Neil	83	US	Animator	Fantasia; Dumbo
October	19	Arthur Ibbetson	75	UK	Cinematographer	Willy Wonka & the Chocolate Factory; Where Eagles Dare
October	20	Ron Tarr	60	UK	Actor	Willow; A View to a Kill
October	24	Michael Balfour	79	UK	Actor	Batman; Fahrenheit 451
October	24	Don Messick	71	US	Voice Actor	Jetsons: The Movie; The Transformers: The Movie
October	28	Paul Jarrico	82	US	Screenwriter	Tom, Dick and Harry; The Girl Most Likely
October	30	Samuel Fuller	85	US	Director, Screenwriter	The Big Red One; Shock Corridor
November	5	Louise Campbell	86	US	Actress	Emergency Squad; Night Club Scandal
November	6	William Watson	59	US	Actor	In the Heat of the Night; Chato's Land
November	8	Michael Ward	88	UK	Actor	Frankenstein and the Monster from Hell; Revenge of the Pink Panther
November	10	Ave Ninchi	82	Italy	Actress	Lacombe Lucien; Murmur of the Heart
November	11	William Alland	81	US	Producer, Actor	Citizen Kane; Creature from the Black Lagoon
November	12	Sándor Szabó	82	Hungary	Actor	Topaz; Bluebeard
November	13	Dietrich Lohmann	54	Germany	Cinematographer	Deep Impact; The Peacemaker
November	15	Saul Chaplin	85	US	Musical Director, Producer	West Side Story; Seven Brides for Seven Brothers
November	15	Warren Douglas	86	US	Actor, Screenwriter	Homicide; Incident
November	15	David Toguri	64	Canada	Choreographer, Actor	Who Framed Roger Rabbit; The Rocky Horror Picture Show
November	16	David K. Stewart	60	??	Visual Effects Artist	Blade Runner; Alien 3
November	17	Peter James	73	UK	Set Decorator, Art Director	Lolita; The Parent Trap
November	17	Wilfred Josephs	70	UK	Composer, Orchestrator	The Deadly Bees; Frantic
November	19	Alfred Roome	88	UK	Film Editor, Director	Carry On; The Lady Vanishes
November	21	Jack Purvis	60	UK	Actor	Star Wars; Time Bandits
November	22	Joanna Moore	63	US	Actress	Follow That Dream; Walk on the Wild Side
November	23	Robert Lewis	88	US	Director, Actor	Anything Goes; Ziegfeld Follies
November	25	Charles Hallahan	54	US	Actor	The Thing; Dante's Peak
November	30	Glyn Dearman	57	UK	Actor	Scrooge; The Flesh and the Fiends
December	2	Marge Kotlisky	70	US	Actress	Sixteen Candles; Major Dundee
December	4	Richard Vernon	72	UK	Actor	Goldfinger; A Hard Day's Night
December	14	Stubby Kaye	79	US	Actor	Guys and Dolls; Cat Ballou
December	16	Richard Warwick	52	UK	Actor	Romeo and Juliet; Hamlet
December	17	Peter Taylor	75	UK	Film Editor	The Bridge on the River Kwai; Summertime
December	18	Chris Farley	33	US	Actor, Comedian	Tommy Boy; Beverly Hills Ninja
December	19	Michael Alldredge	56	US	Actor	Scarface; Iron Eagle
December	20	Dawn Steel	51	US	Producer, Executive	City of Angels; Cool Runnings
December	23	Stanley Cortez	89	US	Cinematographer	Chinatown; The Night of the Hunter
December	24	Toshiro Mifune	77	Japan	Actor, Producer	Seven Samurai; Rashomon
December	25	Denver Pyle	77	US	Actor	Bonnie and Clyde; The Man Who Shot Liberty Valance
December	28	Bill Anderson	86	US	Producer	Swiss Family Robinson; Old Yeller
December	31	Billie Dove	94	US	Actress	The Black Pirate; Beyond the Rainbow

== Film debuts ==
- Simon Baker – L.A. Confidential
- Eric Bana – The Castle
- Mischa Barton – Lawn Dogs
- Paul Bettany – Bent
- Leslie Bibb – Private Parts
- Jessica Biel – Ulee's Gold
- Cate Blanchett – Paradise Road
- Orlando Bloom – Wilde
- Gerard Butler – Mrs. Brown
- Linda Cardellini – Good Burger
- John Cho – Shopping for Fangs
- Jason Clarke – Dilemma
- James Corden – Twenty Four Seven
- James D'Arcy – Wilde
- Jack Davenport – Fierce Creatures
- Chiwetel Ejiofor – Amistad
- Shannon Elizabeth – Jack Frost
- Mike Epps – Strays
- Tom Felton – The Borrowers
- Jennifer Garner – Deconstructing Harry
- Andrés Gertrúdix – My Brother's Gun
- Vahina Giocante – Marie Baie des Anges
- Judy Greer – Stricken
- Adrian Grenier – Arresting Gena
- Ioan Gruffudd – Wilde
- Katie Holmes – The Ice Storm
- Nicolaj Kopernikus – Let's Get Lost
- Sanaa Lathan – Drive
- Method Man – One Eight Seven
- Ken Marino – Gattaca
- Eddie Marsan – The Man Who Knew Too Little
- Samantha Morton – This Is the Sea
- Alessandro Nivola – Inventing the Abbotts
- Nick Offerman – Going All the Way
- Cheri Oteri – Liar Liar
- Sarah Paulson – Levitation
- Sara Paxton – Liar Liar
- Norman Reedus – Floating
- Matthew Rhys – House of America
- Maya Rudolph – Gattaca
- Amy Sedaris – Commandments
- Sarah Silverman – Who's the Caboose?
- Amy Smart – Campfire Tales
- J.B. Smoove – Lesser Prophets
- Scott Speedman – Kitchen Party
- Mena Suvari – Nowhere
- Dominique Swain – Lolita
- Alan Tudyk – 35 Miles from Normal
- Tristán Ulloa – Memorias del ángel caído
- Leonor Varela – Le ciel est à nous
- Milo Ventimiglia – Boys Life 2
- Merritt Wever – Arresting Gena
- Olivia Williams – Gaston's War
- Dean Winters – Conspiracy Theory
- Evan Rachel Wood – Digging to China
- Jose Yenque – Fall
- David Zayas – Lena's Dreams
