= Deaths in October 1997 =

The following is a list of notable deaths in October 1997.

Entries for each day are listed alphabetically by surname. A typical entry lists information in the following sequence:

- Name, age, country of citizenship at birth, subsequent country of citizenship (if applicable), reason for notability, cause of death (if known), and reference.

== October 1997 ==
=== 1 ===
- Francisco Aramburu, 75, Brazilian footballer.
- Georg Bodenhausen, 92, Dutch civil servant.
- John Bredice, 63, American football player (Philadelphia Eagles).
- Jerome H. Lemelson, 74, American engineer, inventor and patent holder, liver cancer.
- Gul Mohammed, 40, Shortest adult human, heart attack.
- Inbal Perlmuter, 26, Israeli rock musician, singer, composer and lyricist, traffic collision.

=== 2 ===
- Carybé, 86, Argentine-Brazilian artist, historian and journalist, heart failure.
- Douglas Fairbairn, 70, American author.
- Esa Seeste, 84, Finnish Olympic gymnast (1936).
- Guillermo Meza Álvarez, 80, Mexican painter.

=== 3 ===
- Michael Adekunle Ajasin, 88, Nigerian politician.
- John Ashley, 62, American actor, producer and singer, heart attack.
- Walter Baumgartner, 92, Swiss film composer.
- Richard Gilkey, 72, American painter, suicide by gunshot.
- Verna Hillie, 83, American film actress, stroke.
- Jarl Kulle, 70, Swedish actor and director, bone cancer.
- Millard Lampell, 78, American movie and television screenwriter, lung cancer.
- Phil Medley, 81, American songwriter.
- Charlie Parsley, 71, American basketball player (Philadelphia Warriors), and college coach.
- Hadassah Rosensaft, 85, Polish Holocaust survivor, liver failure.
- A. L. Rowse, 93, British historian and author.
- George Urban, 76, Hungarian writer.
- Blake Wayne Van Leer, 71, United States Navy officer.

=== 4 ===
- Helmut Cämmerer, 86, German canoeist and Olympian (1936).
- Montanino Nuvoli, 66, Italian Olympic rower (1952).
- Nelson Coral Nye, 90, American author and editor.
- Otto Ernst Remer, 85, German Wehrmacht officer during World War II.
- Anne Strachan Robertson, 87, Scottish archaeologist, numismatist and writer.
- Gunpei Yokoi, 56, Japanese video game designer and creator of the Game Boy, traffic collision.
- Georgi Yumatov, 71, Soviet and Russian film actor, aneurysm.

=== 5 ===
- Chitta Basu, 70, Indian politician, heart attack.
- Mary Jayne Gold, 88, American heiress, pancreatic cancer.
- Andrew Keir, 71, Scottish actor (Cleopatra, Rob Roy, Mary, Queen of Scots).
- Debbie Linden, 36, British glamour model and actress, heroin overdose.
- John Chester MacRae, 85, Canadian politician, member of the House of Commons of Canada (1957–1972).
- Dave Marr, 63, American golfer and sportscaster, stomach cancer.
- Brian Pillman, 35, American professional wrestler (WCW, WWF, ECW), heart attack.
- Tommy Ring, 67, Scottish footballer.
- Larisa Rozanova, 78, Soviet and Ukrainian pilot and navigator during World War II.
- Curtis Williams Sabrosky, 87, American entomologist.
- Arthur Tracy, 98, American vocalist and actor, heart attack.
- Bernard Yago, 81, Ivorian cardinal of the Catholic Church.

=== 6 ===
- Orlando Ramón Agosti, 73, Argentine general and part of the military junta, cancer.
- George T. Barclay, 87, American football player and coach.
- Warren Louis Boudreaux, 79, American prelate of the Roman Catholic Church, heart failure.
- Robert Endean, 71, Australian marine scientist.
- Otto Grolimund, 79, Swiss Olympic field hockey player (1948).
- Adrienne Hill, 60, English actress (Doctor Who), cancer.
- Yevgeny Khaldei, 80, Soviet naval officer and photographer.
- Johnny Vander Meer, 82, American baseball player (Cincinnati Reds, Chicago Cubs, Cleveland Indians), abdominal aneurysm.

=== 7 ===
- Arvo Ala-Pöntiö, 55, Finnish Olympic weightlifter (1972, 1976).
- Felicisimo Ampon, 76, Filipino tennis player.
- Johnny Darrell, 57, American country music artist, diabetes.
- Gus Marker, 92, Canadian ice hockey player.
- Lou Possehl, 71, American baseball player (Philadelphia Phillies).
- Aldo Sebben, 77, American football, cross country, and track and field coach.
- Janez Vrhovec, 76, Yugoslav actor of Slovenian-German origin.
- Wan Laiming, 97, Chinese animator.

=== 8 ===
- Henryk Bista, 63, Polish actor.
- Albert Blumberg, 91, American philosopher and political activist.
- Bertrand Goldberg, 84, American architect and industrial designer.
- Robin Lee, 77, American figure skater and Olympian (1936).
- Brown Meggs, 66, American writer and music executive.
- John Merricks, 26, English sailor and Olympian (1996).
- Nininho, 73, Brazilian football player.
- Desmond J. Scott, 79, New Zealand flying ace during World War II.
- Sant Singh Sekhon, 89, Indian playwright and writer.
- George Everard Kidder Smith, 84, American architectural writer and photographer.
- William Spong Jr., 77, American politician, member of the United States Senate (1966–1973).
- Mel Thurston, 78, American basketball player (Tri-Cities Blackhawks, Providence Steamrollers).
- Ernesto P. Uruchurtu, 91, Mexican politician, head of the Federal District Department from 1952 to 1966.

=== 9 ===
- Michael Cummings, 78, British newspaper cartoonist.
- Monty Hoyt, 53, American figure skater and Olympian (1964), melanoma.
- Arch Johnson, 75, American actor, cancer.
- Peter O'Malley, 70, New Zealand cricketer.
- Jean Pasqualini, French/Chinese journalist.
- Joel Pritchard, 72, American politician, member of the United States House of Representatives (1973–1985), lymphoma.
- Roy Rappaport, 71, American anthropologist.
- Chuck Templeton, 65, American baseball player (Brooklyn Dodgers).

=== 10 ===
- D. J. Ambalavanar, 69, Sri Lankan Tamil bishop.
- Marjorie Harris Carr, 82, American scientist and environmental activist.
- Michael J. S. Dewar, 79, American theoretical chemist.
- Hans-Joachim Kasprzik, 69, German film and television director and screenwriter.
- George Malcolm, 80, English pianist, harpsichordist, composer, and conductor.
- Anne Marriott, 83, Canadian writer, stroke.
- Dencio Padilla, 69, Filipino actor and comedian, heart attack.
- Marjorie McQuade, 63, Australian swimmer and Olympian (1948, 1952).
- Walt Simon, 57, American basketball player (New Jersey Americans/Nets, Kentucky Colonels).
- Thomas Whiteside, 79, American journalist, heart failure.

=== 11 ===
- Paul Doughty Bartlett, 90, American chemist.
- Giacinto Bosco, 92, Italian jurist, academic and politician.
- Lina Gennari, 86, Italian actress and operetta singer.
- Käthe Gold, 90, Austrian actress.
- Will Sherman, 69, American gridiron football player (Dallas Texans, Los Angeles Rams, Minnesota Vikings).
- Ivan Yarygin, 48, Soviet / Russian heavyweight freestyle wrestler and Olympian (1972, 1976), traffic collision.

=== 12 ===
- Raúl Arellano, 62, Mexican football forward.
- Rodrigue Bourdages, 73, Canadian politician, member of the House of Commons of Canada (1958–1962).
- John Denver, 53, American singer ("Take Me Home, Country Roads", "Poems, Prayers & Promises", "Annie's Song") and activist, plane crash.
- Talib El-Shibib, 63, Iraqi politician.
- Eleanor Fortson, 93, American politician, member of the Washington House of Representatives (1973–1979).
- Draga Garašanin, 76, Serbian archaeologist.
- Kenneth Hahn, 77, American civil servant, heart failure.
- Fred McCain, 79, Canadian politician.
- Isadore Twersky, 67, American orthodox rabbi and professor.

=== 13 ===
- Ian Stuart Black, 82, British novelist, playwright and screenwriter.
- Joyce Compton, 90, American actress.
- Gary Lee Davis, 53, American convicted murderer, execution by lethal injection.
- Kārlis Irbītis, 92, Latvian aeroplane designer.
- Yasuo Kawamura, 89, Japanese Olympic speed skater (1932, 1936).
- Obie Layton, 86, American baseball player.
- Richard Mason, 78, British novelist, lung cancer.
- Malte Möller, 83, Swedish Olympic wrestler (1948).
- Frazier Robinson, 87, American baseball player.
- William Staveley, 68, Royal Navy officer, heart attack.
- Adil Çarçani, 75, Albanian politician.

=== 14 ===
- Hy Averback, 76, American actor, producer and director.
- Piedade Coutinho, 77, Brazilian swimmer and Olympian (1936, 1948, 1952).
- Jacqueline Delubac, 90, French stage and film actress, traffic collision.
- George Forrest, 72, British classicist and academic, cancer.
- Henry Pelling, 77, British historian.
- Harold Robbins, 81, American writer, heart failure.
- Barbara Slater, 76, American film actress.

=== 15 ===
- Jack Arnold, 78, Australian rugby league footballer.
- MacDonald Critchley, 97, British neurologist.
- Peter J. Dalessandro, 79, United States Army soldier and Medal of Honor recipient.
- Jack Dwyer, 70, American gridiron football player (Washington Redskins, Los Angeles Rams).
- Walter Fritzsch, 76, German football player and manager.
- Parker T. Hart, 87, American diplomat.
- Bill McKay, 76, Irish rugby player.
- Käthe Sohnemann, 85, German Olympic gymnast (1936).

=== 16 ===
- A. H. Armstrong, 88, English educator and author.
- Dick Cavalli, 74, American cartoonist, heart attack.
- Princess Olga of Greece and Denmark, 94, Greek princess, Alzheimer's disease.
- Noel Ferrier, 66, Australian comedian, actor, and theatrical producer.
- Lotte Goslar, 90, German-American dancer.
- Adam Kennedy, 75, American actor, novelist, and painter, heart attack.
- Audra Lindley, 79, American actress (Three's Company, Another World, The Heartbreak Kid), leukemia.
- James A. Michener, 90, American author, kidney failure.

=== 17 ===
- Joyce Christ, 76, Australian cricketer.
- Larry Jennings, 64, American magician.
- Sergei Kalinin, 70, Soviet Russian sports shooter and Olympian (1960, 1964).
- Jim O'Neil, 84, Canadian ice hockey player (Boston Bruins, Montreal Canadiens).
- Giorgio Pisanò, 73, Italian journalist, essayist and neo-fascist politician.
- László Szabados, 86, Hungarian swimmer and Olympic medalist (1932).
- Ben Welden, 96, American actor.
- Fang Yi, 81, Chinese Communist revolutionary, diplomat, and politician.

=== 18 ===
- Leonard Andrzejewski, 73, Polish actor.
- Ramiro Castillo, 31, Bolivian footballer, suicide by hanging.
- Gordon Clark, 83, English football player.
- Walter William Curtis, 84, American prelate of the Roman Catholic Church, pneumonia.
- Nancy Dickerson, 70, American radio and television journalist, stroke.
- Trude Eipperle, 89, German operatic soprano.
- Vince Gironda, 79, American bodybuilder, personal trainer and author.
- Roberto Goizueta, 65, Cuban businessman and CEO of The Coca-Cola Company, cancer.
- J. Smith Henley, 80, American judge.
- Étienne Laisné, 92, French Olympic racewalker (1936).
- Milt Neil, 83, American animator (Fantasia, Dumbo, The Three Caballeros).
- William Rotsler, 71, American artist, cartoonist, pornographer and author.
- Geoff Walker, 45, New Zealand Olympic canoeist (1980).
- Paul Edwin Zimmer, 54, American poet and author, heart attack.

=== 19 ===
- Donald R. Bensen, 70, American editor and science fiction writer.
- Glen Buxton, 49, American guitarist and composer, complications from pneumonia.
- Claudia Drake, 79, American actress and singer.
- Harold French, 100, English film director, screenwriter and actor.
- Arthur Ibbetson, 75, British cinematographer (Willy Wonka & the Chocolate Factory, Where Eagles Dare, The Bounty).
- Ragnar Larsen, 66, Norwegian footballer.
- Francisco Guerrero Marín, 46, Spanish composer.
- William J. McGill, 75, American psychologist and author.
- Brenton Miels, 49, Australian rules footballer.
- Pilar Mercedes Miró Romero, 57, Spanish screenwriter and film director, heart attack.
- Stella Sierra, 80, Panamanian poet and prose writer.

=== 20 ===
- John Jacobs, 50, American student and anti-war activist, complications from melanoma.
- Frank Robert Miller, 89, Canadian air chief marshal.
- Manush Myftiu, 78, Albanian politician.
- Thormod Næs, 67, Norwegian Olympic sports shooter (1964).
- Manuel Rodríguez Barros, 71, Spanish racing cyclist.
- Li Ruishan, 76, Chinese politician.
- Ron Tarr, 60, British actor, cancer.
- Henry Vestine, 52, American guitarist, heart and respiratory failure.
- Robin Woods, 83, English Anglican bishop.

=== 21 ===
- Dolph Camilli, 90, American baseball player.
- John Whitney Hall, 81, American Japanologist.
- Lorenzo Sumulong, 92, Filipino politician.
- Aale Tynni, 84, Finnish poet and translator.
- Waldemar F. A. Wendt, 85, United States Navy admiral.
- Dick Wilkins, 72, American gridiron football player (Los Angeles Dons, Dallas Texans, New York Giants).

=== 22 ===
- Leonid Amalrik, 92, Soviet animator.
- Edoardo Casciano, 61, Italian Olympic sports shooter (1960).
- Reinhard Lauck, 51, German footballer and Olympian (1976), traffic collision.
- Charles McCallister, 94, American Olympic water polo player (1932, 1936).
- Kelly Rodriguez, 90, Spanish-American football player.
- Quentin Smythe, 81, South African sergeant and recipient of the Victoria Cross, cancer.
- C. S. A. Swami, 83, Indian journalist, athlete, and Olympian (1936).
- Valerie Taylor, 84, American author and feminist.
- Matthew Trupiano, 58, American mobster, heart attack.

=== 23 ===
- Alan Broadley, 77, Australian rules footballer.
- Ann Devroy, 49, American political journalist, uterine cancer.
- Claire Falkenstein, 89, American visual artist, stomach cancer.
- Bert Haanstra, 81, Dutch filmmaker, Alzheimer's disease.
- Arthur Stephen Lane, 86, American district judge (United States District Court for the District of New Jersey).
- Pinchas Lapide, 74, Israeli theologian and historian.
- Kim Lim, 61, Singaporean-British sculptor and printmaker.
- Bob Manning, 71, American big band singer, pneumonia.
- Michael Peter, 48, German Olympic field hockey player (1972, 1976, 1984).
- Georges Pianta, 85, French politician .
- Babette Rosmond, 79, American author.
- Alfredo dos Santos, 77, Brazilian footballer.
- Luther George Simjian, 92, Armenian-American inventor and entrepreneur.
- Trevor Smith, 87, English footballer and manager.
- Gerd Tacke, 91, German businessman and CEO of Siemens.

=== 24 ===
- Luis Aguilar, 79, Mexican actor, and singer.
- Skip Alexander, 79, American golfer.
- Michael Balfour, 79, English actor, cancer.
- Don Messick, 71, American voice actor (Scooby-Doo, Where Are You?, The Yogi Bear Show, The Jetsons), stroke.

=== 25 ===
- William J. Hirsch, 88, American thoroughbred racehorses trainer, Alzheimer's disease.
- Tina Lattanzi, 99, Italian actress and voice actress.
- Jamie Livingston, 41, American photographer and film maker, brain tumor.
- Mina Rees, 95, American mathematician.

=== 26 ===
- Georg Adelly, 78, Swedish film actor.
- Teng Haiqing, 88, Chinese military officer and a politician.
- William B. Hutchinson, 88, American physician.
- Rolf Kukowitsch, 84–85, German football coach.
- Donald Ray Matthews, 90, American politician, member of the United States House of Representatives (1953–1967).
- Rankin M. Smith Sr., 72, American businessman and philanthropist.

=== 27 ===
- Mahala Andrews, 58, British vertebrae palaeontologist.
- Achim Gercke, 95, German Nazi politician.
- Angèle Picado, 62, French Olympic sprinter (1956).
- Pentti Repo, 67, Finnish Olympic discus thrower (1960, 1964).
- Vladimir Sokoloff, 84, American pianist and accompanist.
- Thomas Dale Stewart, 96, American anthropologist.
- Reuben Sturman, 73, American businessman and pornographer.
- François-Henri de Virieu, 65, French journalist and television presenter, pancreatic cancer.

=== 28 ===
- Walter Capps, 63, American politician, member of the United States House of Representatives (1997), heart attack.
- Toni Carabillo, 71, American feminist, graphic designer, and historian, lung cancer.
- Paul Jarrico, 82, American screenwriter, traffic collision.
- Marian E. Koshland, 76, American immunologist, lung cancer.
- Bryan Lefley, 49, Canadian ice hockey player (New York Islanders, Kansas City Scouts, Colorado Rockies) and coach, traffic collision.
- Billy Neill, 47, Northern Irish football player.
- Klaus Wunderlich, 66, German musician, heart attack.

=== 29 ===
- Robert Allart, 83, Belgian weightlifter and Olympian (1948, 1952).
- Len Beurton, 83, English communist and Soviet agent.
- H. C. Coombs, 91, Australian economist and public servant.
- William Crook, 72, American politician and ambassador, congestive heart failure.
- Alexander zu Dohna-Schlobitten, 97, German junker, businessman and author.
- Paul Guth, 87, French journalist and writer.
- Anton LaVey, 67, American author, musician, and occultist, pulmonary edema.
- Andreas Gerasimos Michalitsianos, 50, Greek-American astronomer and astrophysicist, brain tumor.
- Big Nick Nicholas, 75, American jazz saxophonist and singer, heart failure.
- Anthony Velonis, 86, American painter and designer.

=== 30 ===
- Jacques Derogy, 72, French journalist, cancer.
- Samuel Fuller, 85, American screenwriter, novelist, and film director.
- Barney Martin, 74, American baseball player (Cincinnati Redlegs).
- Sydney Newman, 80, Canadian film and television producer (The Avengers, Doctor Who), heart attack.

=== 31 ===
- Zubeida Agha, 75, Pakistani artist.
- Bram Appel, 75, Dutch footballer and Olympian (1948).
- Hans Bauer, 70, German footballer.
- Loh Ah Chee, 75, Malaysian Olympic sports shooter (1964).
- Sidney Darlington, 91, American electrical engineer.
- Sam Hairston, 77, American baseball player (Chicago White Sox).
- Tadeusz Janczar, 71, Polish film actor.
- Taisto Kangasniemi, 73, Finnish heavyweight wrestler and Olympian (1948, 1952, 1956, 1964).
- Wilfrid Oulton, 86, British Royal Air Force officer, cancer.
- George Roth, 86, American gymnast and Olympic champion (1932).
