= Karrys =

Karrys is a Canadian surname. Notable people with it include:

- Byron Karrys (1926–1981), football player
- George Karrys (born 1967), curler and journalist
- Steve Karrys (1924–1997), football player
