= Alexander McGregor =

Alexander McGregor may refer to:

- Alexander McGregor (New Zealand politician)
- Alexander McGregor (Canadian politician)

== See also ==
- Alex McGregor (disambiguation)
