= Alex McGregor =

Alex McGregor may refer to:

- Alex McGregor (actress), South African actress
- Alex McGregor (footballer, born 1896), Scottish football player (Dumbarton, Celtic)
- Alex McGregor (footballer, born 1950), Scottish football player (Ayr United, Shrewsbury Town, Aldershot)
- Alex McGregor (Australian footballer) (1908–1997), Australian rules footballer for Geelong
- Alex McGregor (politician) (fl. 2000), Canadian politician, Progressive Conservative Party candidate in Sudbury
