= Byron Karrys =

Canadian football player (1926–1981)

Profile
- Position: Halfback

Personal information
- Born: 1926; Toronto, Ontario, Canada
- Died: August 20, 1981 (aged 55); Mount Albert, Ontario, Canada
- Listed height: 6 ft 0 in (1.83 m)
- Listed weight: 180 lb (82 kg)

Career history
- 1945–1951: Toronto Argonauts

Awards and highlights
- Grey Cup champion (1945, 1946, 1947, 1950)

Byron Karrys (1926 – August 20, 1981) was a Canadian professional football player who played for the Toronto Argonauts. He won the Grey Cup with the Argonauts in 1945, 1946, 1947, and 1950. He died after an illness in 1981. His brother, Steve Karrys also played football for the Argonauts.
