= Frances E. Nealy =

American actress

- Born: October 14, 1918; San Diego, California
- Died: May 23, 1997 (aged 78); Hollywood, California
- Occupations: Dancer; actress
- Years active: 1933−1989

Frances E. Nealy (October 14, 1918 – May 23, 1997) was an American actress and dancer. She starred in Harold Robbins' 79 Park Avenue.

She was born Frances Elizabeth Warner, the only child of Milton Warner and Elizabeth Bowen Warner, in San Diego. Nealy, who began tap dancing when she was 15, was once billed as "The Female Bill Robinson". She arrived in Hollywood in 1939 and performed at the Club Alabam with other black entertainers. By that time, "The biggest part of the black heyday in Hollywood was over," she said.

In 1968, she performed in "New Sole Sisters", a multi-generational production of female dancers.

In the 1980s, Nealy had her own studio, where she taught tap dancing. In 1984, Nealy had a brief role as a hotel chambermaid in Ghostbusters, during which her character's cart was exploded with pyrotechnics. According to a documentary included in one of the film's home releases, her response ("What the hell are you doing?!") was an unscripted line directed at the film's special effects lead, Thaine Morris, and was later added to the script.

== Filmography ==
Year	Title	Role	Notes
1952	Skirts Ahoy!	Black Drill Team Member	Uncredited
1962	The Manchurian Candidate	Woman in Lobby	Uncredited
1968	Finian's Rainbow	Sharecropper	Uncredited
1969	The Love God?	Minor Role	Uncredited
1970	Alex in Wonderland	Maid	
1975	Darktown Strutters	Cinderella	
1980	Schizoid	Housekeeper	
1982	Life of the Party: The Story of Beatrice	Ann	
1983	Blue Thunder	Mayor's Aide	
1983	WarGames	Visitor	
1983	My Brother's Wedding	Mrs. Dubois	
1984	Ghostbusters	Chambermaid	
1988	Colors	Neighbor Woman	
1989	Tap	Dancer #2	
