= Morton Bard =

American psychologist

- Born: March 7, 1924 (age 102); Brooklyn, New York
- Died: December 4, 1997 (aged 73)
- Education: St. John's University, New York University

Morton Bard (born March 7, 1924, in Brooklyn, New York - d. December 4, 1997) was an American psychologist, known for the research he undertook on the psychology of crime victims. He was a one-time member of the New York Police Department, a psychologist, and a professor who studied the reactions of crime victims.

Bard, in partnership with the police, conducted studies of crime victims (e.g., hostages, rape victims, and the families of murder victims). He published two volumes on domestic violence and crisis intervention. He also is recognized for having laid the foundation of victim-focused training in many law enforcement academies and the FBI National Academy.

In 1979, Bard co-authored The Crime Victim's Book. This volume provides practical information on how best to identify and support the needs of crime victims. The Crime Victim's Book was considered a "bible" for not only advocates but also crime victims. He is considered to have been a pivotal critical thinker in the development of the modern discipline of crisis intervention. He also wrote scholarly articles on the training of police officers in the application of different forms of crisis intervention in the field.

== Education ==
Bard received a bachelor's degree in 1947 from St. John's University. He later went on to receive a master's degree in 1948 and a doctorate in 1953, both in psychology from New York University.

== Career ==
Bard started off his career in health psychology. From 1951 to 1961, he was a member of a clinical and research group at Memorial Sloan-Kettering Cancer Center. There, he analyzed the psychological effects of cancer and cancer surgery. During this time, Bard shifted the psychological focus from the role of personality in predisposing one to illnesses to the psychological consequences of living with illnesses like cancer.

From 1965 to 1970, Bard taught at the City College of New York and was the director of its Psychology Center. In 1971, Bard joined CUNY's graduate school and university center. He was a professor in the graduate school's doctoral programs in social psychology and criminal justice. At the CUNY Graduate School, Bard studied hostage situations, third-party interventions in disputes, and the effects of personal crimes. Bard was a psychology professor at the City University of New York until his retirement in 1986.

In 1982, Bard was named chairman of the American Psychological Association's task force on victims of crime and violence. In 1982, he was awarded the New York State Psychological Association's Kurt Lewin Award.

In 1985, he was appointed to a committee to advise the New York Mayor, Edward I. Koch, on the police department. The panel went on to make recommendations that included comprehensive changes in the training of police officers. Bard laid down the groundwork for training police as specialists in family crisis intervention. This included training for police officers on innovative crime prevention and mental health techniques so they were better able to provide immediate crisis intervention when emergencies arose and other professionals (e.g., social workers, psychologists) were not available.

In the 1980s, Bard was a consultant in psychology to the departments of medicine and neurology at Memorial Sloan-Kettering, which in 1987 awarded him the Arthur M. Sutherland Award for "pioneering research in psycho-oncology."

He was also the American Cancer Society's national vice president for service and rehabilitation from 1986 to 1991.

== Personal life ==
Bard married Arlene Cohen in 1948 and had two daughters (Erica Riley and Pamela Richlin).

== Death ==
Bard died of cancer in his home in Atlanta, Georgia, at the age of 73 on December 4, 1997.

== Publications ==
Bard, M., & Sutherland, A. M. (1955). Psychological impact of cancer and its treatment IV. Adaptation to radical mastectomy. Cancer, 8(4), 656–672.

Bard, M., & Berkowitz, B. (1967). Training police as specialists in family crisis intervention: A community psychology action program. Community Mental Health Journal, 3, 315–317.

Bard, M. (1969). Family intervention police teams as a community mental health resource. Journal of Criminal Law, Criminology and Police Science, 60, 247–250.

Bard, M., & Sangrey. D. (1986). The Crime Victim's Book. Secaucus, NJ: Citadel Press.

Zacker, J., & Bard, M. (1973). Effects of conflict management training on police performance. Journal of Applied Psychology, 58(2), 202.

== Note ==
1. Bard, M. (1969). Family intervention police teams as a community mental health resource. Journal of Criminal Law, Criminology and Police Science, 60, 247–250.
