= Andreas Gerasimos Michalitsianos =

Greek-American astrophysicist

- Born: 22nd May, 1947; Alexandria, Egypt
- Died: 10th October, 1997; Baltimore, Maryland, U.S.
- Known for: Research on symbiotic stars; work on the Hubble Space Telescope and International Ultraviolet Explorer
- Awards: NASA Meritorious Achievement Award
- Scientific career
- Fields: Astronomy, Astrophysics
- Institutions: Goddard Space Flight Center

Dr. Andreas 'Andy' Gerasimos Michalitsianos (Greek: Ανδρέας Γεράσιμος Μιχαλιτσιάνος) (May 22, 1947 – October 29, 1997) was a Greek-American astronomer and a NASA astrophysicist, also known and published as Andrew G. Michalitsianos.

Born in Alexandria, Egypt on May 22, 1947, Andreas grew up with his mother, who spoke little English and briefly, with his father. He moved with his family to New York City in 1949 and lived in the Queens borough before going to college. Michalitsianos's father, Gerasimos Andreas, was a sea captain of a Greek tanker, the SS Foundation Star (formerly SS Lampas), but the ship was caught up in a hurricane and sunk in September 1952 off the coast of Norfolk, Virginia, and Michalitsianos's father died of pneumonia shortly after rescue. Andreas showed an early interest in astronomy and physics from an early age, winning a science contest in 1959 and serving as president of the Junior Astronomy Club in NYC where his accomplishments included leading a South American eclipse expedition. He graduated from Newtown High School in 1965 and then earned his bachelor's degree in physics from the University of Arizona at Tucson in 1969, working at the nearby Kitt Peak National Observatory as a student employee in the Space Division to help pay off his college debts. His duties at Kitt Peak included the initial tests of a remotely controlled telescope.

Andreas then received a scholarship and earned his Ph.D. in astrophysics from University of Cambridge, Churchill College in 1976 while doing research on a theoretical topic in solar physics. He would later work as a junior research fellow at the California Institute of Technology and then as an astrophysicist at NASA's Goddard Space Flight Center from the 1970s until his death. Michalitsianos was involved with such projects as the Hubble Space Telescope and was the Deputy Project Manager of the Observatory Branch for Goddard's highly successful International Ultraviolet Explorer, in which he won several awards for his contributions. Michalitsianos eventually went on to become Chief of the Laboratory for Astronomy and Solar Physics at the Goddard Space Flight Center in early 1997, and was renowned for his breakthrough research on symbiotic stars. His many awards included the NASA Meritorious Achievement Award.

Michalitsianos died on October 29, 1997, in Baltimore, Maryland, after a long struggle with a brain tumor. Until his last days he was hard at work rejuvenating the laboratory of which he had recently taken command, and on a proposal for a spacecraft to monitor temporal changes in the ultraviolet and X-ray spectra of stars and active galaxies. He was survived by his wife, two daughters, a son and a sister.

A landbased robotic telescope on the island of Cefalonia in western Greece is named in his honor. The Andreas Gerasimos Michalitsianos telescope, located within a former Hellenic Air Force communications station, has been utilized by Greek universities and The Eudoxos Project to advance Greek secondary education in introductory astronomy and physics laboratories for high school students.
