= Helmi Abou El-Maati =

Egyptian footballer (died 1997)

Personal information
- Place of birth: Port Said, Egypt
- Date of death: 6 July 1997
- Place of death: Cairo, Egypt
- Position: Midfielder

Youth career
- –: El-Masry SC

Senior career*
Years	Team	Apps	(Gls)
–1946	El-Masry SC		
1946–1958	Al Ahly		

International career
- Egypt
Medal record
Men's Football
Representing Egypt
Africa Cup of Nations
Winner	1957 Sudan
- * Club domestic league appearances and goals

Helmi Abou El-Maati (died 6 July 1997) was an Egyptian footballer. He competed in the men's tournament at the 1948 Summer Olympics.

== Honours ==
Egypt

- African Cup of Nations: 1957
