= Jim MacBeth =

Australian rules footballer, born 1914

Personal information
- Full name: Jim MacBeth
- Born: 7 April 1914
- Died: 6 July 1997 (aged 83)
- Original team: Port Melbourne
- Height: 170 cm (5 ft 7 in)
- Weight: 83 kg (183 lb)

Playing career^{1}
Years	Club	Games (Goals)
1938	Richmond	4 (0)
1942, 1944	St Kilda	19 (2)
Total		23 (2)
- ^{1} Playing statistics correct to the end of 1944.

Jim MacBeth (7 April 1914 – 6 July 1997) was a former Australian rules footballer who played with Richmond and St Kilda in the Victorian Football League (VFL).
