= Alf Svendsrud =

Norwegian footballer (1922-1997)

Personal information
- Date of birth: 7 January 1922
- Date of death: 22 July 1997 (aged 75)

International career
| Years | Team | Apps | (Gls) |
| 1947 | Norway | 1 | (0) |

Alf Svendsrud (7 January 1922 – 22 July 1997) was a Norwegian footballer. He played in one match for the Norway national football team in 1947.
