= László Tharnói-Kostyál =

Hungarian writer

- Born: 25 May 1912; Nové Mesto nad Váhom, Austria-Hungary
- Died: 15 July 1997 (aged 85); Budapest, Hungary
- Occupation: Writer

László Tharnói-Kostyál (25 May 1912 – 15 July 1997) was a Hungarian writer. His work was part of the literature event in the art competition at the 1936 Summer Olympics.
