= Hanna Walz =

German politician (1918–1997)

Hanna Walz MEP
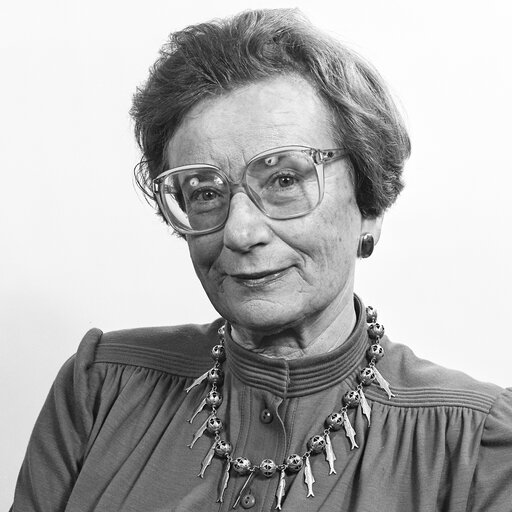

Member of the European Parliament
- In office 1973–1984
- Constituency: West Germany

Personal details
- Born: 28 November 1918 Templin, West Germany
- Died: 17 December 1997 (aged 79) Fulda, Germany
- Party: Christian Democratic Union of Germany

Johanna Walz (28 November 1918 – 17 December 1997) was a German politician who served as a Member of the European Parliament from 1979 to 1984. Born in Templin, Walz graduated from the Gymnasium zum Grauen Kloster in 1936, and received a degree in law and political science in 1940. In 1945, she began working for the newspaper Deutsches Allgemeinen Sonntagsblattes, and in 1948 she received her doctorate from the University of Tübingen. After working for five years with the World Council of Churches, she moved to Fulda and began to get involved in politics.

Walz joined the Christian Democratic Union of Germany (CDU) in 1955, and three years later was elected to the Landtag of Hesse. After winning re-election in 1962 and 1966, she was elected to the Bundestag in 1969. She was a member of the 6th, 7th, and 8th Bundestag sessions, serving in that role until 1980. During her time in the Bundestag, she worked to try to get more women elected, particularly after the 1972 elections showed a major decrease in the number of women running for office. Walz was first appointed as a Member of the European Parliament in 1973, and was re-elected to that role in 1979. During her first elected term, she served as chairperson of the Committee on Energy and Research. She retired from politics after her term ended in 1984.
