= Ragnar Larsen (footballer, born 1931) =

Norwegian footballer

Personal information
- Date of birth: 13 August 1931
- Date of death: 19 October 1997 (aged 66)

International career
Years	Team	Apps	(Gls)
1954–1959	Norway	12	(1)

Ragnar Larsen (13 August 1931 – 19 October 1997) was a Norwegian footballer. He played in twelve matches for the Norway national football team from 1954 to 1959.
