= Harry Jones (Australian footballer, born 1911) =

Australian rules footballer, born 1911

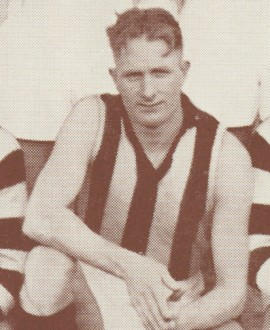
- Jones during his Collingwood career

Personal information
- Born: 9 August 1911
- Died: 19 July 1997 (aged 85)
- Original team: Brunswick
- Height: 175 cm (5 ft 9 in)
- Weight: 74 kg (163 lb)

Playing career^{1}
Years	Club	Games (Goals)
1936–38	Collingwood	17 (8)
- ^{1} Playing statistics correct to the end of 1938.

Harry Jones (9 August 1911 – 19 July 1997) was an Australian rules footballer who played with Collingwood in the Victorian Football League (VFL).
