= Arvo Ala-Pöntiö =

Finnish weightlifter (1942–1997)

Personal information
- Nationality: Finnish
- Born: 20 September 1942; Himanka, Finland
- Died: 7 October 1997 (aged 55); Tampere, Finland

Sport
- Sport: Weightlifting

Arvo Ala-Pöntiö (20 September 1942 – 7 October 1997) was a Finnish weightlifter. He competed at the 1972 Summer Olympics and the 1976 Summer Olympics.
