= Rosy Gibb =

- Born: Rosemary Elizabeth Jane Gibson; 8 November 1942; Dublin, Ireland
- Died: 13 July 1997 (aged 54); London, England
- Spouse: Andrew Gibb
- Parent: Jack Gibson

Rosemary or Rosy Gibb (8 November 1942 – 13 July 1997) was an Irish social worker, clown, and magician. She was one of the first women to be accepted into The Magic Circle.

== Life ==
Rosemary Gibb was born Rosemary Elizabeth Jane Gibson in Dublin on 8 November 1942. She was the only child of the surgeon and hypnotist, Jack Gibson, and his wife Elizabeth Maude Gibson (née James). She spent her early years in Guernsey, where her father was a surgeon to the Channel Islands. As a teenager the family lived in Rhodesia and Ethiopia. As a small child she had suffered from tuberculosis, but recovered and became an athlete. As a swimmer, Gibb represented Ireland, setting an Irish record at the backstroke. She represented the Channel Islands at netball, horse-riding and tennis, and Britain at show-jumping. During her time in Ethiopia, it is said she taught Haile Selassie's grandchildren horse-riding. As a young woman she was Ireland's first twist champion and was awarded a RSPCA gold medal for rescuing a drowning dog from the River Liffey.

In 1961, she returned to Ireland to enrol in Trinity College Dublin, where she was known for her extrovert nature and academic abilities. Graduating in 1965, Gibbs went on to gain an M.Litt. in Anglo-Irish literature. While in Trinity Gibb met Andrew Craddock Gibb, whom she married in 1967. The couple had one son and one daughter. The couple lived in Swords, County Dublin briefly, where Gibb founded a literacy programme for traveller children in the area. The family moved to London in 1968. She undertook a diploma in social administration at the London School of Economics. In her job as a social worker in London she continued to work with the travelling community. This included lobbying for improved halting sites and educational programmes in inner London. This work resulted in her becoming the first teacher officially designated to the travelling community.

In 1978, Gibb decided to change her career and began training as a clown. She learnt fire-eating, conjuring, juggling, mime, and escapology. She was awarded Time Out's Street Magician of the Year for her participation in the International Festival of Street Magicians. Having initially busked in London and Brighton, she later performed in libraries, schools, children's theatres and community centres. She was involved in the establishment of the Old Vic's children's theatre. She heavily involved in charity work, in particular entertaining and training those with intellectual disabilities. Gibb toured with the British Council in the Middle East, Europe and Asia. On moving back to London from Brighton, she started working more as a magician, with an offbeat act that was aimed at adult audiences. Gibb was one of the first women to be accepted into The Magic Circle, and was awarded the Craig Trophy by the International Brotherhood of Magicians in 1996. She died in London on 13 July 1997 of cancer.
