= George Bryce (footballer) =

Australian rules footballer

Personal information
- Full name: George Bryce
- Born: 18 October 1915
- Died: 25 December 1997 (aged 82)
- Original team: South Melbourne Districts
- Height: 183 cm (6 ft 0 in)
- Weight: 79 kg (174 lb)

Playing career^{1}
Years	Club	Games (Goals)
1937–1939	South Melbourne	26 (7)
- ^{1} Playing statistics correct to the end of 1939.

George Bryce (18 October 1915 – 25 December 1997) was an Australian rules footballer who played with South Melbourne in the Victorian Football League (VFL).
