= Fred Burton (footballer) =

Australian rules footballer

Personal information
- Full name: Fred Burton
- Born: 4 June 1918
- Died: 24 July 1997 (aged 79)
- Original team: West Torrens / North Adelaide
- Height: 182 cm (6 ft 0 in)
- Weight: 85 kg (187 lb)

Playing career^{1}
Years	Club	Games (Goals)
1943	St Kilda	3 (0)
- ^{1} Playing statistics correct to the end of 1943.

Fred Burton (4 June 1918 – 24 July 1997) was an Australian rules footballer who played with St Kilda in the Victorian Football League (VFL).
