= List of crime films of 1997 =

This is a list of crime films released in 1997.

Title	Director	Cast	Country	Notes
8 Heads in a Duffel Bag	Tom Schulman	Joe Pesci, Andy Comeau, Kristy Swanson, David Spade, Todd Louiso, George Hamilton, Dyan Cannon	United States	Crime comedy
9 millimeter	Peter Lindmark	Abou-Bakre Aalam, Astrid Asseta	Sweden	
Affliction	Paul Schrader	Nick Nolte, James Coburn, Sissy Spacek	United States	Crime drama
Assassin(s)	Mathieu Kassovitz	Mathieu Kassovitz, Michel Serrault, Mehdi Benoufa	France	
Another Day in Paradise	Larry Clark	James Woods, Melanie Griffith, Vincent Kartheiser, Natasha Gregson Wagner	United States	Crime drama
Brother	Alexei Balabanov	Sergei Bodrov Jr., Viktor Sukhorukov, Svetlana Pismichenko	Russia	
City of Industry	John Irvin	Harvey Keitel, Stephen Dorff, Timothy Hutton, Famke Janssen	United States	
Cop Land	James Mangold	Sylvester Stallone, Harvey Keitel, Ray Liotta, Robert De Niro, Peter Berg, Janeane Garofalo, Cathy Moriarty, Robert Patrick, Michael Rapaport, Annabella Sciorra	United States	
Cure	Kiyoshi Kurosawa	Kōji Yakusho, Tsuyoshi Ujiki, Anna Nakagawa	Japan	Crime thriller
Dang Bireley's and Young Gangsters	Nonzee Nimibutr	Jesdaporn Pholdee, Noppachai Muttaweevong	Thailand	
Dobermann	Jan Kounen	Vincent Cassel, Monica Bellucci, Tchéky Karyo	France	
Donnie Brasco	Mike Newell	Johnny Depp, Al Pacino, Michael Madsen, Bruno Kirby, Anne Heche, James Russo	United States	
Funny Games	Michael Haneke	Susanne Lothar, Ulrich Mühe, Arno Frisch	Austria	
Green Fish	Lee Chang-dong	Han Suk-kyu, Shim Hye-jin, Moon Sung-keun	South Korea	Crime drama
Grosse Pointe Blank	George Armitage	John Cusack, Minnie Driver, Dan Aykroyd, Alan Arkin	United States	
Hana-bi	Beat Takeshi Kitano	Beat Takeshi Kitano, Kayoko Kishimoto, Ren Osugi	Japan	Crime drama
Jackie Brown	Quentin Tarantino	Pam Grier, Samuel L. Jackson, Robert Forster, Bridget Fonda, Michael Keaton, Robert De Niro	United States	
Joyride	Quinton Peeples	Tobey Maguire, Wilson Cruz, Benicio del Toro	United States	Crime thriller
Keys to Tulsa	Leslie Greif	Eric Stoltz, Cameron Diaz, James Spader	United States	
Kiss or Kill	Bill Bennett	Frances O'Connor, Matt Day, Chris Haywood	Australia	
L.A. Confidential	Curtis Hanson	Kevin Spacey, Russell Crowe, Guy Pearce, Kim Basinger, Danny DeVito, James Cromwell, David Strathairn	United States	
Lewis and Clark and George	Rod McCall	Rose McGowan, Salvator Xuereb, Dan Gunther	United States	Crime comedy
Perdita Durango	Álex de la Iglesia	Rosie Perez, Javier Bardem, Harley Cross	Spain; Mexico	
Playing God	Andy Wilson	David Duchovny, Timothy Hutton, Angelina Jolie	United States	
Shooting Fish	Stefan Schwartz	Dan Futterman, Stuart Townsend, Kate Beckinsale	United Kingdom	Crime comedy
Six Ways To Sunday	Adam Bernstein	Norman Reedus, Deborah Harry, Elina Löwensohn	United States	
Suicide Kings	Peter O'Fallon	Christopher Walken, Denis Leary, Henry Thomas, Johnny Galecki, Sean Patrick Flanery, Laura San Giacomo	United States	
The Swindle	Claude Chabrol	Isabelle Huppert, Michel Serrault, François Cluzet	France; Switzerland	
Young and Dangerous 4	Andrew Lau	Ekin Cheng, Jordan Chan	Hong Kong	Gangster film
