= Jerry March =

American organic chemist (1929–1997)

Jerry March, Ph.D. (August 1, 1929 – December 25, 1997) was an American organic chemist and a professor of chemistry at Adelphi University.

March authored the March's Advanced Organic Chemistry text, which is considered to be a pillar of graduate-level organic chemistry texts. The book was prepared in its fifth edition at the time of his death.
