= John Hoesli =

British art and set director

John Hoesli (8 March 1919 – 22 March 1997) was a British art and set decorator. He is best known for being the art director on films such as John Huston's The African Queen, Stanley Kubrick's 2001: A Space Odyssey (1968), Anthony Asquith's Orders to Kill (1958) with Alan Withy, and Jeannot Szwarc's Santa Claus: The Movie (1985) with Don Dossett. It was Hoesli who found the old steamboat used in The African Queen at Butiaba on Lake Albert.

Hoesli was also an assistant art director for many films which often went uncredited including Alfred Hitchcock's Jamaica Inn (1939), Gerald Thomas's Carry On Emmannuelle (1978), and Lifeforce (1985), and worked as a set decorator for films such as John Boorman's Deliverance (1972). He died in March 1997 at the age of 78 in Bracknell, Berkshire.
