= Chris Walder =

Dutch footballer

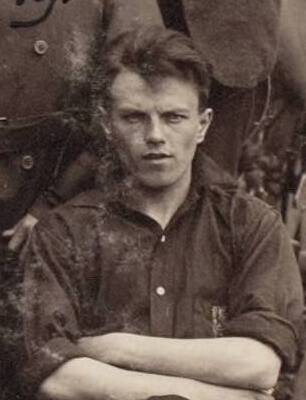
- Walder (1921)

Personal information
- Date of birth: 8 May 1900
- Date of death: 6 December 1997 (aged 97)

International career
Years	Team	Apps	(Gls)
1921	Netherlands	1	(0)

Chris Walder (8 May 1900 – 6 December 1997) was a Dutch footballer. He played in one match for the Netherlands national football team in 1921.
