= The Crime Victim's Book =

First edition (publ. Basic Books)

The Crime Victim's Book, first published in 1979, is a volume co-authored by Dr. Morton Bard (1924-1997) and Dawn Sangrey (ISBN 978-0465014705). which provides practical information on how best to identify and support the needs of crime victims. The Crime Victim's Book was considered for a time after its publication a "bible" for advocates, as well as crime victims.

== Reaction ==
Kirkus Reviews stated that the authors "investigate the victim's feelings following a crime--disorientation, violation, helplessness—and show how insensitivity (from friends, family, police, etc.) can compound the hurt or, conversely, how tactful crisis intervention can speed the individual's recovery. Theirs is an informal survey ("suggestive rather than definitive") but victims could read it and benefit from their findings. They include case histories of crime victims, what they share (such as a search for blame) and which are most vulnerable: ironically, victims unharmed physically may suffer more shame and guilt."
