= Georges Pianta =

French politician (1912–1997)

Georges Pianta (2 March 1912, in Thonon-les-Bains – 23 October 1997 in Thonon-les-Bains) was a French politician. He represented the National Centre of Independents and Peasants (CNIP) (from 1958 to 1962), the Independent Republicans from 1962 to 1978 and the Union for French Democracy (UDF) from 1978 to 1981 in the National Assembly. He was the mayor of Thonon-les-Bains from 1944 to 1980.
