= Roy Finlayson =

Australian rules footballer, born 1909

Personal information
- Full name: Roy Finlayson
- Born: 31 March 1909
- Died: 19 July 1997 (aged 88)
- Original team: Surrey Hills
- Height: 175 cm (5 ft 9 in)
- Weight: 71 kg (157 lb)
- Position: Centre / Rover

Playing career^{1}
Years	Club	Games (Goals)
1929–32	Fitzroy	39 (7)
- ^{1} Playing statistics correct to the end of 1932.

Roy Finlayson (31 March 1909 – 19 July 1997) was an Australian rules footballer who played with Fitzroy in the Victorian Football League (VFL).
