= Victor Feller =

Luxembourgish footballer

Personal information
- Date of birth: 22 February 1923
- Place of birth: Dudelange, Luxembourg
- Date of death: 24 December 1997 (aged 74)
- Place of death: Diekirch, Luxembourg

International career
Years	Team	Apps	(Gls)
- Luxembourg

Victor Feller (22 February 1923 – 24 December 1997) was a Luxembourgish footballer. He competed in the men's tournament at the 1948 Summer Olympics.
