= Obie Layton =

American baseball player

- Pitcher
- Born: July 10, 1911; Birmingham, Alabama, U.S.
- Died: October 13, 1997 (aged 86); Detroit, Michigan, U.S.

Negro league baseball debut
- 1931, for the Hilldale Club

Last appearance
- 1931, for the Hilldale Club

Teams
- Hilldale Club (1931)

Obediah Layton (July 10, 1911 – October 13, 1997) was an American Negro league pitcher in the 1930s.

A native of Birmingham, Alabama, Layton played for the Hilldale Club in 1931. He died in Detroit, Michigan in 1997 at age 86.
