= André Meyer (field hockey) =

French field hockey player

André Meyer (5 October 1919 – 9 July 1997) was a French field hockey player who competed in the 1948 Summer Olympics and in the 1952 Summer Olympics.
