= List of Marathi films of 1997 =

A list of films produced by the Marathi language film industry based in Maharashtra in the year 1997.

== 1997 Releases ==
A list of Marathi films released in 1997.

Year	Film	Director	Cast	Producer	Notes	Source
1997
1997	Saasuchi Maaya	Ramesh Gangane	Alka Kubal; Sameera Gujar; Kishori Ambiye	Shivpratap Films, V.M.P.K. Production		
1997	Kamaal Majhya Baikochi	Kumar sohoni	Laxmikant Berde; Alka Kubal	Kumar sohoni		
1997	Sada haldi kunkwacha	Vasant Painter	Nishigandha Wad; Rahul Solapurkar; Ashok Shinde	वसंत राजे, प्रतापसाळुंके		
1997	Sakharpuda	N.S. Vaidya	मिलींद केळकर, राजेश्वरी, प्रशांत सुभेदार, उदय टिकेकर, शेखर नवरे, ज्योती चांदेकर, मानसी मागीकर, पुष्कर जोग	Annasaheb Deulgaonkar		
1997	Bahini Bahini	Jaisingh Mane	Alka kubal Sagar Talashikar			
1997	Tyaag	Anil Gandhi	Ashok Saraf; Alka Kubal; Avinash Narkar			
1997	Hasari	Subhash Phadke	Manasi Amdekar, Sudhir Joshi, Avinash Narkar, Dilip Kulkarni, Ramesh Bhatkar, Neena Kulkarni			
