= Uldis Ģērmanis =

Latvian historian, writer, and publicist

- Born: 4 October 1915; Novaya Ladoga, Russian Empire
- Died: 19 December 1997 (aged 82); Stockholm, Sweden
- Education: University of Latvia; Stockholm University
- Occupations: Writer, historian

Uldis Ģērmanis (4 October 1915 – 19 December 1997) was a Latvian historian, writer and publicist born in Novaya Ladoga, Russian Empire. His father was a latvian actor Jānis Ģermanis, and his family returned to the newly independent Latvia in 1919.

His pen names include Ulofs Jāņsons and Ulafs Jansons.

He taught history at the University of Latvia in Riga from 1943 and obtained his master's degree. During World War II, he was mobilized to the Latvian Legion and served in the 19th Waffen Grenadier Division of the SS (2nd Latvian) as a military reporter. A few days before the German capitulation, he emigrated to Sweden, where he settled in Solna. In 1974, he received his doctorate in history from the Stockholm University.

Ģērmanis was, since 1935, a lifelong member of the Latvian student fraternity Fraternitas Livonica. His speciality was modern Latvian history, especially of the Soviet Union and the Latvian Riflemen. His ground-breaking work on Jukums Vācietis and the Latvian Riflemen's role in the Bolshevik Revolution paved the way for further research on this subject by other Latvian émigré historians, notably the early works of Andrew Ezergailis.

His book Zili stikli, zaļi ledi (Blue glass, green ice; 1968) describes his experience researching the story of Vācietis. Ģērmanis was one of the rare émigré Latvians allowed access to primary sources in the Latvian SSR at the time. In the book, he describes the suspicion he was met with by both the Soviet Latvian authorities, and by his fellow émigrés, who questioned his motives for researching the history of pro-Bolshevik Latvians.

In 1958, Ģērmanis living in exile completed "The Latvian Saga", which presents Latvian history, but reads like a novel. As the Latvian Embassy in the USA writes:

It describes the people, powers and events that made Latvia what it is today, and puts it all in a broader European context … it inspired several generations of Latvians to dedicate their lives to the restoration of Latvia's independence in 1991.

In 2007, the eleventh edition was issued in an English version and the works of Ģērmanis are becoming increasingly popular in his native country as well.

His lecture in Toronto, in 1988, about "current events" in the Soviet Union, is considered by many to be the best analysis of the situation at the time.

Uldis Ģērmanis was elected a member of the Latvian Academy of Sciences in 1992 and awarded the Order of the Three Stars in 1995.

== Bibliography ==
- ———— (1956). Pa aizputinātām pēdām [On dusty feet] (in Latvian). Stockholm: Daugava.
- ———— (1959). Latviešu tautas piedzīvojumi [Adventures of the Latvian people] (in Latvian). Stockholm: Daugava.
- ———— (1968). Zili stikli, zaļi ledi: Rīgas piezīmes [Blue grass, green ice: Riga notes] (in Latvian). Brooklyn: Grāmatu Draugs. OCLC 186202213.
- ———— (1969–1972). "Zemgaliešu komandieris" [Zemgallian Commander]. Jaunā Gaita (in Latvian). No. 76–90. Archived from the original on 2022-10-14.
- ———— (1971). Tā lieta pati nekritīs [That thing will not happen by itself] (in Latvian). New York City: Grāmatu Draugs.
- ———— (1974). Oberst Vācietis und die lettischen Schützen im Weltkrieg und in der Oktoberrevolution] [Colonel Vācietis and the Latvian Riflemen in the World War and the October Revolution] (in German). Stockholm: Almqvist & Wiksell. OCLC 1171718.
- ———— (1977). Tālu tālumā, lielā plašumā: austrālijas piezīmes [Far away, on a large scale: Australia notes] (in Latvian). Brooklyn: Grāmatu Draugs. OCLC 731511142.
- ———— (1985). Zināšanai [For your information] (in Latvian). Stockholm: Ziemelzvaigzne.
- ———— (1985). Divi portreti [Two portraits] (in Latvian). Stockholm: Atvase.
- ———— (1987). Izvērtēšanai: par mūsu vēsturisko pieredzi [For your evaluation: about our historical experience] (in Latvian). Stockholm: Memento. OCLC 186768882.
- ———— (1988). Laikmeta liecības [Evidence of the age] (in Latvian). Stockholm: Memento.
- ———— (1987). Pakāpies tornī [Climb the tower] (in Latvian). Brooklyn: Grāmatu Draugs. ISBN 978-9-1871-1414-4. OCLC 247636466.
- ———— (1991). Pakāpies tornī (2. daļa) [Climb the tower (part 2)] (in Latvian). Stockholm: Memento. ISBN 978-9-1871-1410-6. OCLC 185974043.
- ———— (1990). Ceļā uz Latviju. Raksti par mūsu vēsturi [On the way to Latvia: essays on our history] (in Latvian). Vårby: Memento. ISBN 978-91-87114-06-9. OCLC 185974003.
- ———— (1995). Jaunie laiki un pagātnes ēnas [New times and shadows of the past] (in Latvian). Riga: Zinātne. ISBN 978-91-87-11420-5. LCCN 97135976. OCLC 34050143. OL 743398M.
- ———— (1998). Mosties, celies, strādā! 99 + 1 domu grauds [Wake up, get up, work!: 99 + 1 grains of thought] (in Latvian). Stockholm: Memento. ISBN 978-91-87114-31-1. LCCN 98224450. OL 492540M.
- ———— (2007). The Latvian Saga. Riga: Atēna. ISBN 978-9984-34-291-7. Archived from the original on 2011-07-22.
- ———— (2007). Dialogi: vēstules un publikācijas, 1989–1997 [Dialogues: writings and publications, 1989–1997] (in Latvian). Riga: Valters un Rapa. ISBN 978-9984-805-09-2.
