= Jack Carr (Australian footballer) =

Australian rules footballer (1913–1997)

Personal information
- Full name: John Leonard Carr
- Born: 26 December 1913; Great Western, Victoria
- Died: 11 July 1997 (aged 83)
- Original team: Stawell

Playing career^{1}
Years	Club	Games (Goals)
1935	Melbourne	2 (0)
- ^{1} Playing statistics correct to the end of 1935.

John Leonard Carr (26 December 1913 – 11 July 1997) was an Australian rules footballer who played with Melbourne in the Victorian Football League (VFL).
