= Eleanor Fortson =

American politician

Member of the Washington House of Representatives from the 10th district
- In office 1973–1979

Personal details
- Born: March 7, 1904 Renton, Washington
- Died: October 12, 1997 (aged 93) Everett, Washington
- Party: Democratic
- Education: Western Washington State College; Central Washington College of Education

Eleanor A. Fortson (March 7, 1904 – October 12, 1997) was an American politician. She was a Democrat, and represented District 10 in the Washington House of Representatives which included northern Snohomish County and all of Island County, from 1973 to 1979.
