= Alex McGregor (Australian footballer) =

Australian rules footballer, born 1908

Personal information
- Full name: Alexander Hugh McGregor
- Born: 15 June 1908; Mount Gambier, South Australia
- Died: 1 December 1997 (aged 89); Geelong, Victoria
- Height: 179 cm (5 ft 10 in)
- Weight: 78 kg (172 lb)

Playing career^{1}
Years	Club	Games (Goals)
1934–1935	Geelong	32 (7)
- ^{1} Playing statistics correct to the end of 1935.

Alexander Hugh McGregor (15 June 1908 – 1 December 1997) was an Australian rules footballer who played for the Geelong Football Club in the Victorian Football League (VFL).

McGregor served in the Australian Army during World War II, serving at both Tobruk and then in New Guinea where he suffered shrapnel wounds to both legs. He was Mentioned in Despatches in early 1944 for his gallant and distinguished service in the South West Pacific.
