= Steve Karrys =

Canadian football player

Profile
- Position: Halfback

Personal information
- Born: June 20, 1924; Montreal, Quebec, Canada
- Died: July 12, 1997 (aged 73); Toronto, Ontario, Canada
- Listed height: 6 ft 0 in (1.83 m)
- Listed weight: 180 lb (82 kg)

Career history
- 1945–1946: Toronto Argonauts
- 1948–1950: Ottawa Rough Riders
- 1951–1953: Toronto Argonauts

Awards and highlights
- Grey Cup champion (1945, 1946, 1952)

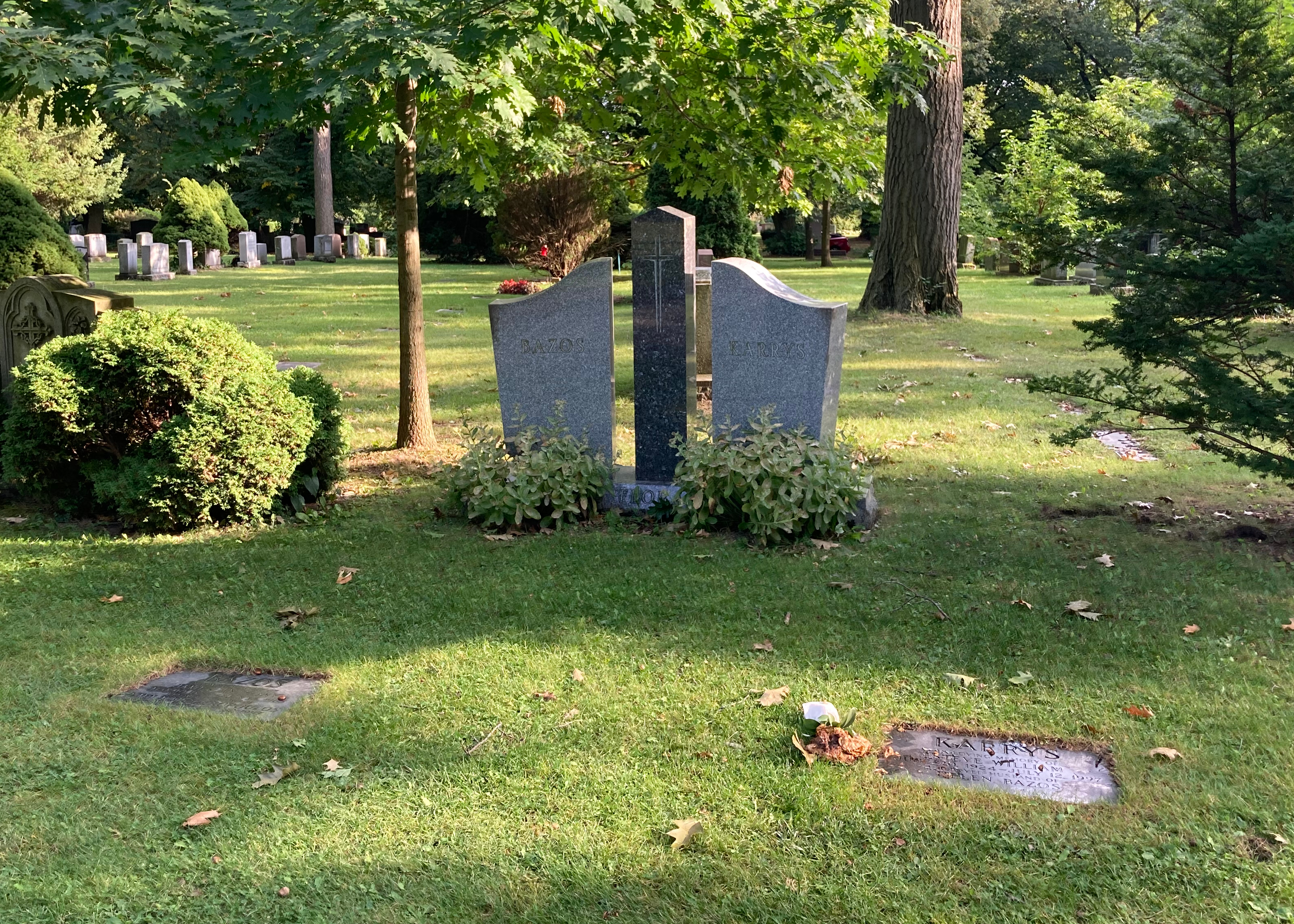
Karrys' grave at Mount Pleasant Cemetery

Stelio William Karrys (June 20, 1924 – July 12, 1997) was a Canadian professional football player who played for the Toronto Argonauts and Ottawa Rough Riders. He won the Grey Cup with Toronto in 1945, 1946, and 1952. He also attended and played football at the University of Toronto. He worked in his family business, Karrys Brothers Corp., a tobacco and convenience-distribution business started by his father. He died in 1997, and was buried at Mount Pleasant Cemetery, Toronto.
