= Source =

Source may refer to:

== Research ==
- Historical source
- Source (intelligence) or sub source, typically a confidential provider of non open-source intelligence
- Source (journalism), a person, publication, publishing institute or other record or document that gives information
- Source document, a document in which data collected for a clinical trial is first recorded
- Source text, in research (especially in the humanities), a source of information referred to by citation
  - Primary source, a first-hand written evidence of history made at the time of the event by someone present
  - Secondary source, a written account of history based upon the evidence from primary sources
  - Tertiary source, a compilation based upon primary and secondary sources
- Sources (website), a directory of expert contacts and media spokespersons
- Open source, a philosophy of dissemination of intellectual products

== Law ==
- Sources of international law, the materials and processes out of which the rules and principles regulating the international community are developed
- Sources of law, the materials and processes out of which law is developed

== Mathematics and physics ==
- Sources and sinks, a general mathematical analogy used in science
- Source of a morphism
- Source, a point where the divergence of a vector field is positive
- Source of a representation, in finite group theory
- Source, a terminal in a field-effect transistor
- Current source, an electrical or electronic device that delivers or absorbs electric current
- Energy sources, substances or processes with high concentrations of energy
- Ion source, a device that creates atomic and molecular ions
- Light source, an object emitting light
- Point source, a single identifiable localised source of something
- Radioactive source, a known quantity of a radionuclide which emits ionizing radiation
- Sound source, an object emitting sound
- Voltage source, any device or system that produces an electromotive force between its terminals

== Computing and technology ==
- Source (command), a UNIX command to execute commands from a file
- Communication source, objects which encode message data and transmit the information
- Source code, a file containing code for software written in a programming language
- Source theory, any process that generates successive messages in information theory
- Source (programming language), a family of sublanguages of JavaScript to support Structure and Interpretation of Computer Programs, JavaScript Adaptation

== Earth and life sciences ==
- Inflow (hydrology), the source of the water in a lake
- Source (hydrology), the original point from which a river or stream flows
- Source rocks, rocks that have generated, or are capable of generating hydrocarbons
- Source tissue, plant tissue serving as a source of nutrients; for example see Somatic embryogenesis

== Art and entertainment ==
=== Fictional entities ===
- Source (comics), a sentient entity who provides advice to the New Gods in the DC Multiverse

=== Games ===
- Source (game engine), a game engine developed by Valve
  - Source 2, the successor to Source
- Counter-Strike: Source, a 2004 complete remake of Counter-Strike using the Source game engine
- Day of Defeat: Source, a 2005 complete remake of Day of Defeat using the Source game engine

=== Music ===
- Source (album), a 2020 album by Nubya Garcia, or the title song
- Source, a 2003 album by the Duskfall
- "Source", a song by Tycho from his 2016 album Epoch

=== Periodicals ===
- Source (lifestyle magazine), a bi-monthly magazine published by the John Lewis Partnership
- Source (photography magazine), a quarterly photography magazine
- Sources: A Journal of Jewish Ideas, published by the Shalom Hartman Institute

=== Visual arts ===
- Source (1/3), public artwork by U.S. artist Tony Smith

== Organizations ==
- Source (UNSW), a community service provider that used to operate at the University of New South Wales in Sydney, Australia
- Source Family (1922–1975), a commune outside of 1970's Hollywood
- Source Vagabond Systems, an Israeli manufacturer using the brand "SOURCE"

== Places ==
- Natural spring
- Headwaters
- Les Sources (English: Sources), Estrie, Quebec, Canada; a regional county municipality
- Des Sources station (English: Sources station), Montreal, Quebec, Canada; a light rail station
- Boulevard Des Sources (English: Sources Boulevard), Montreal, Quebec, Canada; a large street

== Other uses ==
- Operation Source, a series of attacks on German warships in 1943
- Absolute (philosophy), or the source, as the absolute principle of being

== See also ==
- The Source (disambiguation)
- Begin (disambiguation)
- La Source (disambiguation)
- Source language (disambiguation)
- Sourceror (disambiguation)
- Sourcing (disambiguation)
- Start (disambiguation)
- Wikisource, an online library of free content textual sources
