= The Source =

The Source may refer to:

== Film and television ==
- The Source (1918 film), 1918 American drama directed by George Melford
- The Source (1999 film), a 1999 documentary film about the Beat generation
- The Source (2002 film), a 2002 science fiction film, also known as The Secret Craft in the UK and The Surge for its American DVD release
- The Source (2011 film), a 2011 French film
- Highlander: The Source, the fifth film in the Highlander franchise
- The Source with Kaitlan Collins, a show by CNN
- The Source (Charmed), a fictional character on the WB television series Charmed
- The Source, a character in the 1978 US television sitcom Quark

== Radio ==
- The Source (network), a radio network operated in the 1970s and 1980s by NBC
- WVUR-FM or "The Source", Valparaiso University's student-run radio station

== Music ==
- The Source (British group), British trio of producers and songwriters known for "You Got the Love"
- The Source (musician), the production identity of UK electronic music producer John Truelove
- The Source (band), a Norwegian jazz band
- The Source (oratorio), a 2014 oratorio by Ted Hearne
- The Source (Ali Farka Touré album), 1993
- The Source (Ayreon album), 2017
- The Source (Dizzy Gillespie album), 1973
- The Source (Grandmaster Flash album), 1986
- The Source (Jackie McLean album), 1973
- The Source (Kendrick Scott album), 2007
- The Source (Kenny Barron album), 2023
- The Source (Tony Allen album), 2017
- The Source, 1969 jazz album by Jimmy Scott
- "The Source", a song by Built to Spill from their 1994 album There's Nothing Wrong with Love

== Publications ==
- The Source (magazine), an American magazine and website
- The Source (novel), a 1965 novel by James A. Michener
- The Source (newspaper), Vancouver, Canada
- The St. Thomas Source, a newspaper published in the United States Virgin Islands
- The Source, a magazine of the International Water Association (IWA)

== Visual arts ==
- The Source (Etrog), public artwork by artist Sorel Etrog
- The Source (Ingres), an 1856 painting by Ingres
- The Source (sculpture), an electronic moving sculpture at the London Stock Exchange
- The Source (Courbet), an 1862 painting by French artist Gustav Courbet

== Other uses ==
- The Source (online service), an online service provider founded in 1979
- The Source (retailer), a Canadian electronics store
- The Source OC, a shopping mall in Buena Park, California

== See also ==
- Source (disambiguation)
