= Jay Neill =

Jay Neill may refer to:

- Jay Wesley Neill (1965–2002), American mass murderer
- Jay Neill (actor) (1932–2006), English variety performer and actor who often appeared in comedic roles
