= Journal of Child Neurology =

- Discipline: Pediatric neurology
- Language: English
- Edited by: Alison Christy

Publication details
- History: 1986-present
- Publisher: SAGE Publishing
- Frequency: 10/year
- Impact factor: 2.0 (2023)

Standard abbreviations
- ISO 4: J. Child Neurol.

Indexing
- ISSN: 0883-0738 (print); 1708-8283 (web)
- LCCN: 2009201854
- OCLC no.: 12041143

Links
- Journal homepage; Online access; Online archive

The Journal of Child Neurology is a peer-reviewed medical journal that covers the field of pediatric neurology. Alison Christy has been editor-in-chief since January 2025. The journal was established in 1986 and is published by SAGE Publishing.

== History ==
The journal was established by Roger Brumback in 1986. Brumback remained editor-in-chief until his death in 2013, when Marc C. Patterson (Mayo Clinic) became editor. Patterson remained editor until 2025 when he was succeeded by Christy.

== Child Neurology Open ==
From 2014-2024, the journal was associated with a peer-reviewed open-access journal called Child Neurology Open. Marc C. Patterson was the editor-in-chief from 2014–2020, Alison Christy from January, 2021 until the journal's closure in January 2024.

== Abstracting and indexing ==
The journal is abstracted and indexed in Scopus and the Science Citation Index Expanded. According to the Journal Citation Reports, the journal has a 2023 impact factor of 2.0.
