= Blue Ridge Savings Bank murders =

South Carolina bank robbery and triple homicide cold case

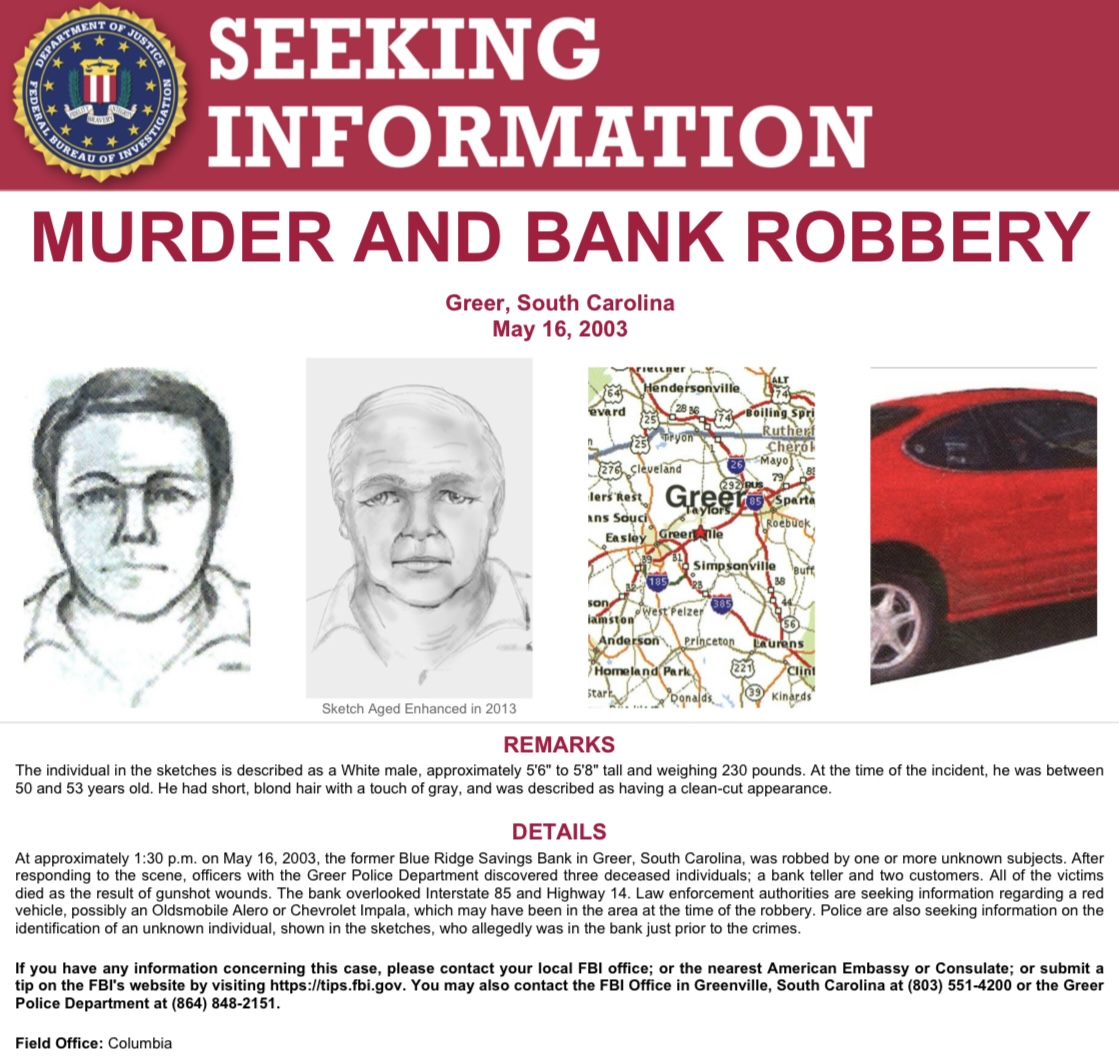
- FBI information poster seeking information about the murders
- Location: Greer, South Carolina, United States
- Date: May 16, 2003; 1:28 p.m. – 1:33 p.m.
- Attack type: Bank robbery and triple-killing
- Weapon: .40 caliber Glock handgun
- Deaths: Sylvia Holtzclaw; Eb Barnes; Maggie Barnes
- Perpetrator: Unknown

The Blue Ridge Savings Bank murders, also known as the Greer bank murders, is an unsolved armed robbery and triple homicide that occurred on May 16, 2003, at the Blue Ridge Savings Bank in Greer, South Carolina.

== Victims ==
Sylvia "Syl" Holtzclaw (née Sudduth) was born on September 8, 1946, in Greer, South Carolina. She had two kids, David and Kevin Holtzclaw, with her high school sweetheart who she later divorced. She had previously worked at the Winn-Dixie warehouse. She was also a regular at the Greer First Baptist Church. Holtzclaw and some of her friends started a Christmas toy drive.

Dr. James Elbert "Eb" Barnes was born on June 5, 1942, in Kingston, Tennessee, and studied at King University. While he was a senior, he met his future wife, Margaret Melton, who was a freshman at the time. The couple would marry in 1965 at the Bethesda Presbyterian Church in McConnells, South Carolina. The couple had three children. Barnes received a Master of Teaching Arts degree from the Vanderbilt University and then a Ph.D. in physics from Clemson University. He would work as a physics professor at USC-Spartanburg for 28 years, and he also served as the interim dean twice. He later headed the Academic Programs Office at the University Center of Greenville.

Margaret McAdory "Maggie" Barnes (née Melton) was born on August 19, 1944, in Bristol, Virginia. She studied at King University and then the Katharine Gibbs School. She would become a spinner and weaver after finding a flax spinning wheel in the attic of her grandparents' house in Alabama. She also worked for the National Beta Club of Spartanburg for 10 years.

== Murders ==
On May 16, 2003, at the Blue Ridge Savings Bank, the only bank teller inside the bank, Sylvia Holtzclaw, was working an extra shift because the other bank teller was unavailable.

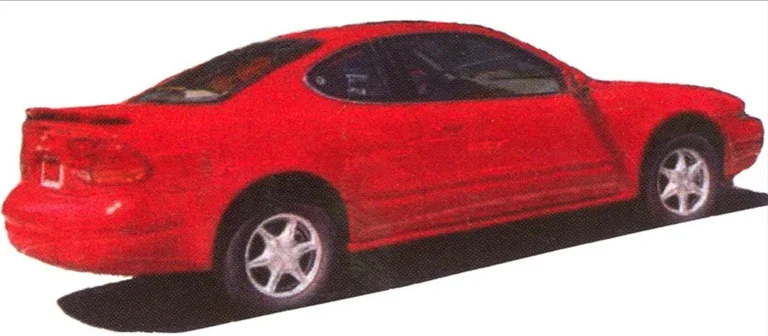
FBI render of the suspect's car

At around 1:00 p.m., Holtzclaw's son, David, entered the bank to give her lunch. At 1:24 p.m., a red coupe, most likely a Oldsmobile Alero, or possibly a Chevrolet Impala, was filmed by a gas station security camera driving towards the bank. Four minutes later, at 1:28 p.m., a man armed with a .40 caliber Glock handgun, most likely a Glock 22 or a Glock 23, entered the bank and held Holtzclaw at gunpoint. Seconds later, a married couple, who were unaware of the robbery, Eb and Maggie Barnes, headed into the bank to transfer money into an IRA account. Eb and Maggie were also held at gunpoint. During this, the silent alarm was tripped, and police were notified of the robbery.

At around 1:30 p.m., the three hostages were forced down a hallway and into the bank's utility room. After entering the utility room, the perpetrator shot all three of them, killing them instantly. At 1:33 p.m., the same red coupe was filmed speeding away from the bank.

At 1:41 p.m., police officers arrived at the scene. They found that a large sum of unmarked bills had been stolen and that there was seemingly no one in the bank. However, when they entered the banks utility room where the bank's security footage was located, they discovered the bodies of Sylvia Holtzclaw and Eb and Maggie Barnes. Police then found that the VHS for the security camera footage was missing, having been stolen and most likely disposed of.

== Investigation ==
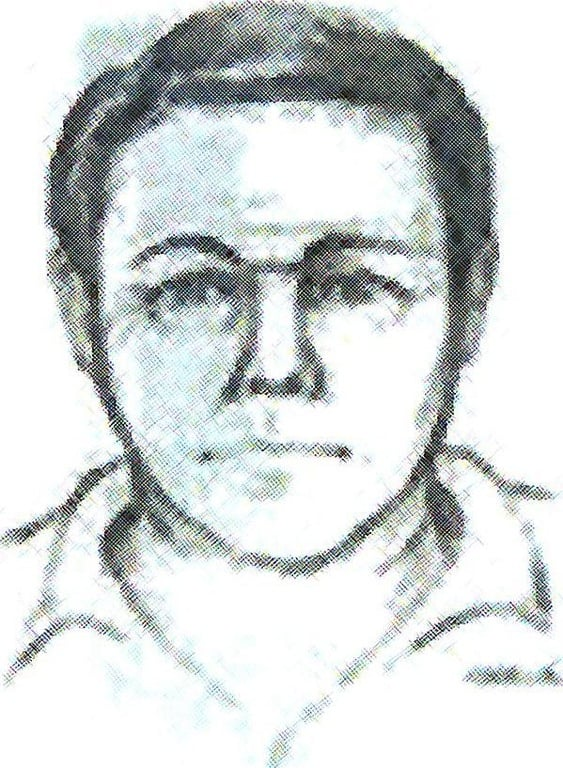
FBI sketch of the possible suspect

The Greer Police Department and the FBI published a sketch of a man who was in the bank prior to the robbery. He was described as being a white male who was around 5'6" to 5'8", around 230 pounds, and between 50 and 53 years old. He was also described as having short blonde hair with there being some graying and a clean cut appearance. The Greer Police Department claimed they had investigated over 700 leads, which all ultimately led nowhere.

=== Suspects ===
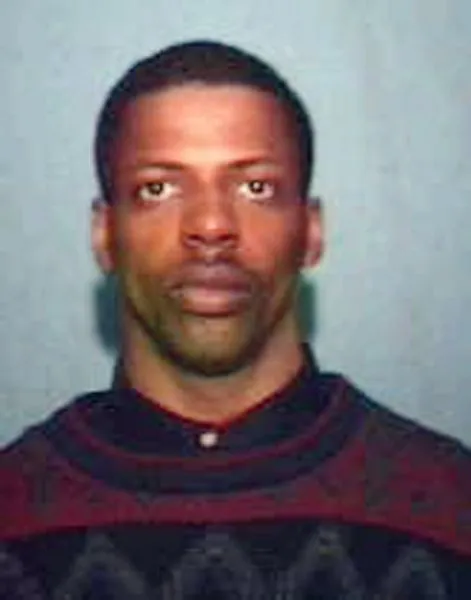
Emmerson Wright

Emmerson Wright, a 39-year-old convicted felon from Beech Island, South Carolina was considered a possible suspect in the case. Wright also went by Ernest Wright and Akim Johnson. Wright had an extensive criminal record in both Georgia and South Carolina from 1985 to 2002. In Georgia, he was convicted of eluding an officer in 1985, aggravated assault on police in 1987, receiving stolen property in 1994, and burglary in 2002. In South Carolina, he was convicted of driving with a suspended license and was charged with unlawful carrying of a firearm in 1990. On May 1, 2003, Wright stole a red Oldsmobile Alero from Avis Rental near the Blue Ridge Savings Bank, only fifteen days before the murders occurred. He also used a .40 caliber Glock handgun in several robberies in Georgia from 2003 to 2005. The Alero was recovered in October 2004 after a police chase in Eastman, Georgia. Wright was responsible for dozens of robberies in Georgia, mainly in Atlanta and Augusta. On August 2, 2005, Wright got into another police chase in Eatonton. Police attempted to pull Wright over, but when he ended up crashing the car he was driving, he fatally shot himself in the head. While many believe Wright committed the murders, there was no actual physical evidence that linked him to the crime.

Todd Kohlhepp, a serial killer who was active in the area at the time, was also considered a suspect. Kohlhepp matched some of the physical descriptions of the suspect in the police sketches released by the Greer Police Department. Parallels were also made between the Blue Ridge murders and the Superbike Motorsports murders, the latter being a crime committed by Kohlhepp.

Lennell Dyches, a 34-year-old janitor and felon, was also considered a suspect. Dyches was responsible for seventeen known bank robberies across South Carolina from April 2000 to January 2006. He was known for wearing outlandish outfits during the robberies. During his final robbery at the Greenwich Credit Union, he wore a bright pink dress. However, throughout his string of robberies, no one was ever injured. Dyches was questioned for possible involvement in the murders but was ultimately cleared after he had an alibi.

Jose Sandoval, Jorge Galindo, and Fernando "Erick" Vela, a group of armed robbers, were investigated for possible involvement in the Blue Ridge Bank murders. The trio had committed a similar crime, known as the Norfolk bank murders, in which they murdered five people at a U.S. Bank in Norfolk, Nebraska. However, the Norfolk bank murders occurred in 2002, and all three men were already imprisoned for the crime prior to the Blue Ridge Savings Bank murders. The crimes were somewhat similar, and police wondered if there was a potential connection. Despite an investigation, no connection was found.

== Legacy ==
The FBI offered a $100,000 reward for any information relating to the murders. Crime Stoppers offered a $2,000 reward for information relating to the case.

In October 2011, the Blue Ridge Savings Bank was shut down by the North Carolina Commissioner of Banks, possibly due to an attempted robbery earlier that year.

Since 2004, friends and family of the Holtzclaws hold the annual Syl Syl Christmas Toy Drive every November in honor of Sylvia Holtzclaw.

Memorial ceremonies were held for the 10th and 20th year anniversaries of the murders.

== See also ==
- Father's Day Bank Massacre
- Geronimo bank murders
- Norfolk bank murders
