= Murder of Sydney Loofe =

2017 murder and dismemberment of Nebraskan woman

Sydney Loofe
- Born: Sydney Irene Loofe; August 21, 1993; Broken Bow, Nebraska, U.S.
- Died: c. November 15, 2017 (aged 24)
- Cause of death: Murder
- Body discovered: Edgar, Nebraska, U.S.
- Education: Neligh-Oakdale High School (graduated 2011)

On November 15, 2017, Sydney Loofe left work to go on a Tinder date in Wilber, Nebraska. The day after, Loofe was reported missing when she failed to appear for work at a local Menards store in Lincoln. Three weeks later, Loofe's dismembered remains were found along a gravel road sixty miles from her date location.

Two suspects, Bailey Boswell and Aubrey Trail, were arrested concerning Loofe's murder. The suspects' stories have changed throughout time. Initially, Boswell and Trail denied involvement in Loofe's killing, but after the discovery of Loofe's body, Trail confessed to the killing, while Boswell maintained innocence. The prosecution's store receipts and video evidence show the couple purchasing bleach, saws, and trash bags shortly before Loofe's disappearance. Cell tower data mapped the suspects following Loofe on the date. Trail was sentenced to death, while Boswell was sentenced to life in prison. Loofe's murder attracted significant mainstream media attention, with news outlets publishing developments as the trials proceeded.

== Background ==
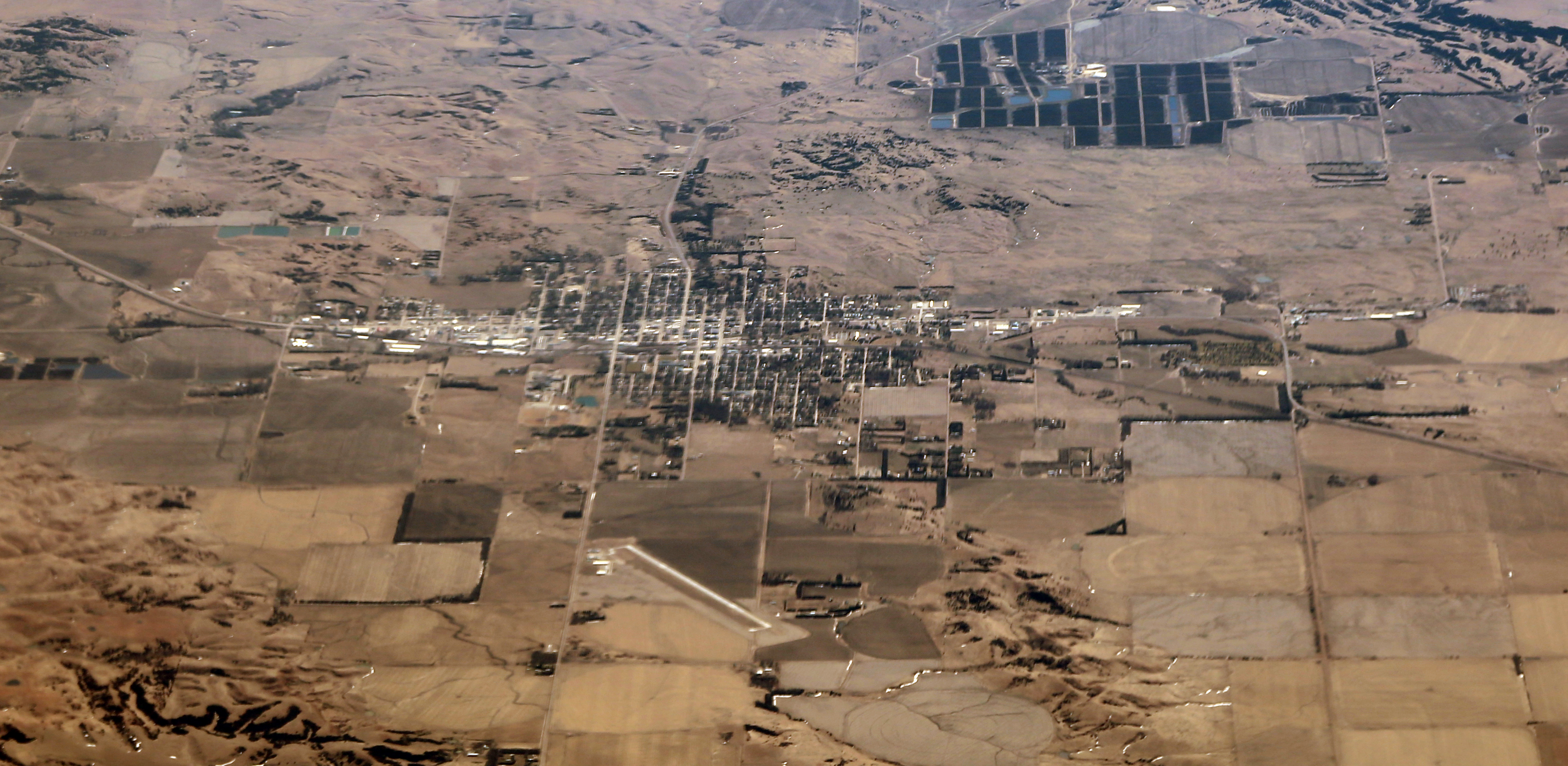
Aerial photograph of Broken Bow, Nebraska, the birthplace of Sydney Loofe

=== Sydney Loofe ===
Sydney Irene Loofe was born on August 21, 1993, in Broken Bow, Nebraska. Raised in Arcadia by her parents George W. and Susie Loofe, Sydney and her family moved to Neligh around 2000. She was known for her skilled fishing. Loofe played basketball and golf while in school, but she developed scoliosis as a teenager, stopping her from playing sports. After graduating from Neligh-Oakdale High School in 2011, she worked at her local Menards store. Susie recounted that her daughter suffered from anxiety and major depression. Days before her disappearance, Loofe discussed her worsening mental health with her family, who scheduled and drove her to a doctor appointment to get antidepressants. It was the last time that Loofe’s family saw her.

=== Bailey Boswell and Aubrey Trail ===
Mugshot of Bailey Marie Boswell

Bailey Marie Boswell was raised in Leon, Iowa. She was an infant when her biological father was murdered. She excelled at school athletics, topping the list of fastest runners on her relay team and scoring dozens of points in basketball games. She was offered a scholarship to play college basketball. However, she turned to substance abuse after graduation. A 2016 issue of the local newspaper of Cameron, Missouri, shows Boswell being fined $400 for possession of recreational drug paraphernalia. A mother to one daughter, Boswell was married to Freddy Pannell. Bailey's mother Priscilla recounted that the Pannell-Boswell relationship was "physically, emotionally and sexually abusive." Pannell had a drug addiction that eventually led authorities to revoke the parents' custody of their school-aged daughter. According to Priscilla, Pannell once beat up a pregnant Bailey before kicking her in the face. Priscilla said that Bailey's move to Princeton, Iowa, was part of her unsuccessful plan to rebuild her life. The prosecutor claimed that Boswell sought out Trail on the now-defunct sex marketplace Backpage, alleging that she was looking for a sugar daddy.

Mugshot of Aubrey Clifton Trail

Aubrey Clifton Trail endured a difficult childhood. At the age of two, he was abused by his parents before his grandfather took care of him. Trail eventually returned to his parents' household, where he was again abused by his stepfather. He grew up in poverty, moving steadily from one foster home and juvenile facility to another, before landing in prison in Tennessee as a teenager of 17 for the armed robbery of a motel.

== Disappearance ==
=== The dates ===
Loofe agreed to go on a first date with Bailey Boswell on November 14, 2017. Boswell used a fake alias of "Audrey." Loofe asked Boswell twice if they would be the only people on the date, to which Boswell responded in the affirmative. The date was held in a basement apartment that Boswell and Trail had rented for six months. On November 15, Loofe went on another date with Boswell. Before heading to her date, Loofe posted a Snapchat image captioned, "Ready for my date." Cell tower data show Boswell and Trail's phones traveling from Loofe's rental home to Wilber. Loofe's phone last pinged in Wilber before the phone shut off at 8:32 p.m.

=== Loofe's disappearance ===
On November 16, Loofe, a store clerk at one of the Menard’s stores in Lincoln, failed to show up for work. Her mother, Susie, texted her, unaware Sydney had gone on a date, but Sydney did not respond. Susie then reported her daughter missing, and the next day, the police paid a welfare check visit at her rental home. Sydney was not found in her home, but there was no evidence of an altercation, and her car, glasses, and purse were left behind. Sydney’s cat had not been fed.

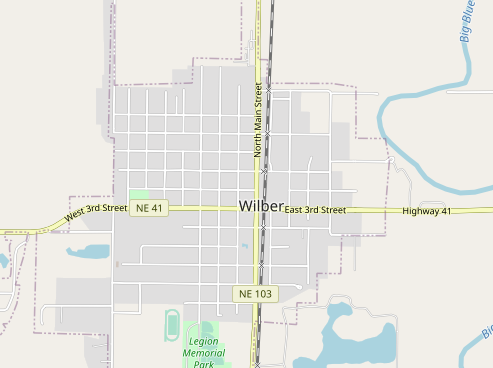
A map of Wilber, Nebraska

Meanwhile, the owner of the duplex where Boswell and Trail rented the basement complained of a bleach odor emanating from the basement. The smell was so strong that a member of the owner's family began throwing up and getting hives. Additionally, it was strange for Boswell and Trail to have an air conditioner on in the cold month of November.

Loofe had confided her date plans to several friends, among them Brooklyn McCrystal. After Loofe went missing, McCrystal set out to find out the identity of the Tinder date. She swiped left on one Tinder profile after another until stumbling upon the profile of "Audrey," where she swiped right. She messaged "Audrey," who responded by messaging back her phone number, which McCrystal provided to authorities.

Within two days, Saline County police were able to pin down the Wilber duplex as the last place where Loofe's phone pinged. Police conducted a welfare check, knocking on Boswell and Trail's apartment door, but no one answered. Using the landlord's key, the police entered the apartment, but the only thing that caught their attention was the pungent smell of bleach. The next day, police came ready with a search warrant, but again, nothing was out of the ordinary, and the basement looked exactly the same as the day before.

=== Persons of interest ===
On November 28, Boswell and Trail were considered by police as persons of interest. The couple responded to this declaration by making a Facebook livestream defending themselves and maintaining their innocence. Boswell claimed that the dates involved her and Loofe driving the car around and smoking cannabis, and that following the second date, Boswell drove Loofe to a friend's home in what was Boswell's last sighting of Loofe. Trail can be heard praying for Loofe to be found safe soon. On November 30, Boswell and Trail were arrested at a motel in Branson, Missouri, on charges related to fraud. They possessed "maps, sleeping bags and hiking shoes" that appeared to have been part of a plan to escape to Mexico.

=== Loofe’s body is found ===
Search teams led by the FBI and local police departments eventually found Loofe's dismembered remains on December 4 and 5. Body parts, sex toys, apparel, and other items were found wrapped inside many 30-gallon black trash bags alongside a gravel road north of Edgar, Nebraska, approximately one hour west of Wilber. Part of Loofe's upper arm was not found. Three months later, Loofe's bra and the shirt seen in her last Snapchat image were discovered.

== Trial ==
=== Trail's confession ===
Trail made several, sometimes contradictory, confessions. Initially, he confessed from jail that he solely killed Loofe. Referencing the law of retaliation, Trail proclaimed his wish to be executed for Loofe's killing. In a subsequent confession, he alleged that Loofe died following a third date with Boswell on November 16. In a third confession, he claimed that the trio was to participate in a sexual fantasy where he would be with two women and that he would choke Loofe, but that Loofe accidentally died as a result. In a fourth confession, he recanted some of his previous confessions, claiming there were no such things as sexual fantasy or threesome but maintained that he accidentally choked Loofe to death. At some point, Trail told the FBI that his job was to make movies for special kinds of kinks; he was paid by people who wanted to see these movies, and he used their money to pay subjects such as Loofe, knowing full well that a choking kink can lead to death. However, some of Trail's confessions seemed credible to authorities, such as when he tipped them off about the location where he threw Loofe's smartphone, leading the police to Wilber's Czech Cemetery where indeed they found her phone, driver's license, and credit card.

=== Trial ===
Judge Johnson presided over the trial that took place in Wilber, NE. On June 11, 2018, Boswell and Trail were charged with murder in the first degree and improper disposal of human remains. A day later, the duo made their first court appearance. In July and August, prosecutors expressed their plans to seek capital punishment for Boswell and Trail, both of whom pled not guilty. The prosecution added conspiracy to commit murder to the list of charges pressed against the two. In June 2019, Trail pled guilty to just one of the charges, namely the improper disposal of Loofe's remains. At the end of June, a frustrated Trail lashed out at the court and the jury, proclaiming Boswell's innocence and cursing everyone before cutting his neck with what appeared to be a razor blade. Though his wounds were not significant, Trail missed a portion of the trial following his injury, due to his refusal to appear.

==== Evidence presented in court ====
The trial proceeded after Trail's injury, and the prosecution presented evidence against Boswell and Trail. Clerks from Falls City's Grand Weaver Hotel stated that they witnessed a woman that could have been Loofe with Boswell and Trail at the hotel weeks before Loofe's disappearance. Surveillance cameras recorded Boswell and Trail checking in at a Best Western hotel in Lincoln, near the Menard’s where Loofe was employed, on November 14 at 4 p.m. On November 15, at 11:30 a.m., they shopped at Aardvark Antique Mall, buying a folding saw, a weeder, and food grinders. Shortly after, cell tower data for both suspects' phones show that they were waiting near Loofe's residence before her departure to work, and they appear to have followed Loofe to Menard’s. There, in that day's CCTV recordings, Trail is seen entering at noon right before Loofe exits the store, with Trail looking over his shoulder at her.

At Menard’s, Trail purchased "an air freshener, cotton cord, Drano, protein bars, a thermometer and lighters." While Loofe was at work, Home Depot surveillance tapes show the duo buying a foot-long hacksaw, wire snips, drop cloths, and a sharp utility knife with backup blades. Other surveillance recordings reveal Boswell and Trail purchasing a tree saw, 30-gallon trash bags, and a couple gallons of Clorox bleach before and after the murder. Clorox and Hefty plastic bags were bought from a Dollar General store a few hours before Loofe's second date, and from a grocery store in Wilber the day after.

Staff at both stores testified at the trial. A manager at the Dollar General store confirmed that the barcodes for the bleach and plastic bags found near Loofe's remains matched the ones in Boswell and Trail's receipts. The manager also presented a receipt dated November 16, 2017, showing Boswell buying a couple of bottles of Drano. At the grocery store, Boswell purchased additional bleach, plastic trash bags, and a trash bin. After these purchases, data from cell towers show the pair's phones traveling to and from the area where Loofe's body remains were found.

Despite extensive searches, authorities could not locate the cutting tools, especially the hacksaw. However, they had many items they could analyze, such as handcuffs, rope, dog collar and leash, and sex toys. Loofe's DNA could not be found anywhere on these items. Pieces of electric wire were found scattered near Loofe's remains, which Trail admitted he used to strangle her. However, the FBI found Loofe's blood on some apparel, namely a rubber glove and a pair of pants. Authorities could not identify who wore the glove or pants, although there was "limited support" for Trail's DNA on the surface of the electric wire. Overall, though, the quality of the latent prints was poor, disabling the police from definitively attributing them to any person.

In July 2019, three women took the stand to allege that Boswell and Trail had expressed the desire to record victims as they tortured and killed them in order to profit by millions of dollars from the sales of these videos. In one of his confessions, Trail claimed that he recorded Loofe consenting to be choked, although that tape has never been found, and Trail never claimed to have recorded her death. Trail went on to recant the claim that he recorded Loofe giving consent to being strangled.

Later that month, the FBI revealed that while the pair were housed at the Saline County Jail, Trail transmitted letters, some in code, to Boswell informing her of what story to tell the court. The codes were deciphered. These letters had Trail taking full responsibility for the murder and painting Boswell as a forced participant in the crime. Also written in the letters were Trail's plans to make money by making snuff sex films, indicating that he lied about his original intention being that no one was to be hurt in the process.

==== Mitigating circumstances ====
Defense attorneys for Boswell and Trail were public defenders. After Trail confessed to strangling Loofe, the defense rested its case on presenting the couple's actions as kinks gone wrong. The defense painted Trail as a person with an impoverished and troubled childhood, someone assisting the police in bringing justice to Loofe's family. Trail's attorney also tried poking holes in the prosecution's case, painting Loofe as a depressed person who used cocaine and citing memes depicting choking and rough sex stored in her iCloud accounts as evidence that Loofe sought out such sexual fantasies. Similarly, Boswell's attorney emphasized Boswell's traumatic childhood, and accentuated her role in Loofe's murder as forced after being emotionally manipulated by Trail, who was double her age. The common denominator in the pair's defense was the wish to avoid the death penalty.

=== Convictions and sentences ===
It took the jury less than three hours to reach the decision to convict Trail of first-degree murder, conspiracy to commit murder, and improper disposal of human remains. Trail sought a new trial, a request that was rejected by Judge Vicky Johnson. Boswell fared better with her request to change venue, which was granted due to prejudice. In February 2020, District Judge Julie Smith recused herself as she was instrumental in the recent implementation of Nebraska's execution protocol.

In October 2020, a jury convicted Boswell of murder in the first degree, conspiracy to commit murder, and improper disposal of human remains. In June 2021, the three-judge panel unanimously agreed to sentence Trail to death. Appealing the sentence, Trail sought to represent himself, a request that was denied. Boswell was sentenced to life in prison after one of the three judges opined that Boswell’s actions did not meet the standard of "exceptional depravity" needed for imposing the capital punishment.

In an unrelated case, Boswell and Trail were sentenced for scamming hundreds of thousands of dollars from interstate coin buyers. Trail already had a criminal background involving forged checks.

Boswell is now an inmate at the Nebraska Correctional Center for Women in York. Trail is on death row at the Tecumseh State Correctional Institution in Tecumseh.

== Legacy ==
A Facebook page, "Finding Sydney Loofe," was created, gaining 30,000 followers. The page is now named "Celebrating Sydney Loofe." The Set Me Free Project, an anti-trafficking nonprofit organization, dedicated a $3,000 scholarship in Loofe's name to be granted to students pursuing careers in criminology, online safety, and social work.

Hulu produced a three-part true crime documentary about Loofe's murder titled Swipe Right on the Devil, which premiered on October 22, 2026. The documentary includes interviews with Loofe's family and Lincoln Police Department Investigators Matt Franken and Bob Hurley. The documentary also explores Trail's bizarre claims of being a "vampire sorcerer" who allegedly practiced black magic, mind control, witchcraft, and lead a coven of witches.

Sourcebooks published a true crime book, based on interviews with the accused, entitled "The Vampire's Cult" by author Chet Hardin.

== See also ==
- List of death row inmates in the United States
