= Sorceress =

A sorceress is a female practitioner of sorcery. Other uses include:

== Film ==
- Sorceress (1982 film), a fantasy film directed by Jack Hill
- Sorceress (1987 film) released in France as Le Moine et la sorcière (The Monk and the Witch), about a Dominican Inquisitor who prosecutes a herbal medicine healer as a witch
- Sorceress (1995 film), a fantasy film directed by Jim Wynorski

== Literature ==
- Sorceress (fantasy) or magician, a type of fictional character
- The Sorceress (play), an 1878 play by Abraham Goldfaden
- The Sorceress: The Secrets of the Immortal Nicholas Flamel, a 2009 novel by Michael Scott

== Music ==
- The Sorceress (opera) or The Enchantress, an 1887 opera by Tchaikovsky
- Sorceress (Opeth album), 2016
- Sorceress (Jess Williamson album), 2020

== Other uses ==
- The Sorceress (Waterhouse), a c. 1911 painting by John William Waterhouse
- A character class in the video game Diablo II
- A character class in the video game Dragon's Crown

== See also ==
- Sorcerer (disambiguation)
- Sorcery (disambiguation)
