= La Source =

La Source is the French for the source or the spring (water). It may also refer to:

la Source or des Sources or les Sources, or variation, may refer to:

== Places ==
- La Source, Haiti, a village in the Grand'Anse department of Haiti
- La Source, Arniquet, Haiti, a village in the Sud department of Haiti
- Les Sources, Estrie, Quebec, Canada; a regional county municipality
- Des Sources station, Montreal, Quebec, Canada; a light rail station
- Boulevard Des Sources, Montreal, Quebec, Canada; a large street

== Arts and entertainment ==
- The Source (Ingres), a painting by Ingres
- The Source (2011 film), a 2011 French drama-comedy
- La Source (2012 film), a 2012 American documentary
- Le Printemps (La Source), a painting by Pierre-Auguste Renoir

=== Ballet ===
- La source (Saint-Léon), an 1866 ballet with music by Léo Delibes and Ludwig Minkus
- La source (Balanchine), a 1986 ballet by George Balanchine to music of Delibes

=== Music ===
- La Source (album), a 2007 album by Nâdiya
- "La Source" (song), a 1968 Eurovision song
- La Source, a musical piece for harp by Alphonse Hasselmans
- Les sources (album), a 2018 album by Vanessa Paradis

== Other ==
- The Source (retailer) (French: La Source), a Canadian electronics retailer
- École élémentaire La Source, elementary school in Barrie, Ontario
- La Source, the name of the first turn (a hairpin) at the motorsport racetrack Circuit de Spa-Francorchamps
- Stade de la Source (English: La Source Stadium), Orleans, France; a soccer stadium

== See also ==
- Source (disambiguation)
