= Tecumseh State Correctional Institution =

Nebraskan state prison

Coordinates: 40.401°N 96.182°W

- Location in Nebraska
- Location: 2725 NE-50 Tecumseh, Nebraska address
- Status: open
- Security class: medium, maximum
- Capacity: 960
- Opened: 2001
- Managed by: Nebraska Department of Correctional Services

The Tecumseh State Correctional Institution (TSCI) is a medium / maximum security state correctional institution for the Nebraska Department of Correctional Services.

The TSCI is in Nemaha Precinct, Johnson County, about 2 miles (3.2 km) north of Tecumseh, Nebraska, it was established in 1997. Construction began in 1998, and the TSCI began accepting inmates in December 2001. All inmates at TSCI are males who were adjudicated as adults and classified as medium or maximum custody. The institution is designed to house 960 inmates; it is the only facility in Nebraska to house male death row inmates (except inmates who are within a week of their execution, who are housed at Nebraska State Penitentiary).

- Security Levels: Maximum, Medium, Death Row
- Average Population: 900
- Number of Staff: 432
- Cost Per Inmate Per Year: $33,377

In 2013 it was over capacity, with 1,008 prisoners. A prisoner riot occurred in 2015.

A riot on May 10, 2015 resulted in the deaths of two inmates and injuries to two guards.

Another incident occurred on March 2, 2017, resulting in the deaths of two inmates.

== Notable inmates ==
- Jorge Galindo – Convicted of the Norfolk bank murders
- Anthony Garcia – Serial killer
- Nikko Jenkins – Spree killer
- John L. Lotter – Charged and found guilty of rape and the first-degree murder of Brandon Teena, the inspiration for the film Boys Don't Cry.
- Jose Sandoval – Convicted of the Norfolk bank murders
- Aubrey Trail – Convicted of the murder of Sydney Loofe
- Erick Vela – Convicted of the Norfolk bank murders
