= 2002 Norfolk bank murders =

Mass murder in Nebraska, U.S.

- Location: 42.026067°N 97.426051°W; Norfolk, Nebraska, U.S.
- Date: September 26, 2002; 24 years ago 8:45 a.m.
- Weapon: 9mm Ruger
- Deaths: 5
- Injuries: 1
- Perpetrators: Jose Sandoval; Jorge Galindo; Erick Vela; Gabriel Rodriguez

On September 26, 2002, three armed robbers killed five people in less than a minute during a botched bank robbery in Norfolk, Nebraska, United States. The three robbers, Jose Sandoval, Jorge Galindo, and Erick Vela, were all convicted and sentenced to death for the crime. A fourth robber, Gabriel Rodriguez, who acted as the getaway driver, was sentenced to five life sentences.

Sandoval later pleaded guilty to murdering a further two people in the months before the bank murders, while a Nebraska State Trooper committed suicide a day later because of a mistake he had made involving one of the robbers prior to the botched robbery. Sandoval, Galindo, and Vela remain on Nebraska's death row awaiting execution. The robbery was the nation's deadliest bank robbery in more than a decade and the deadliest in Nebraska state history.

== Murders ==
On the morning of Thursday, September 26, 2002, at approximately 8:35 a.m., a man entered a U.S. Bank branch at 13th Street and Pasewalk Avenue in Norfolk, Nebraska. The man approached the counter, looked into a security camera, turned around, and walked out. He would later be identified as Gabriel Rodriguez, who was acting as a lookout and had given the all-clear to his cohorts to begin the robbery. Ten minutes later, three men dressed in black clothing with hats pulled low over their faces entered the bank lobby. Each man carried a 9mm handgun.

Upon entering, one of the men, identified as Jorge Galindo, turned left and entered the office of 43-year-old Lola Elwood, the assistant branch manager. Elwood was working with two bank auditors, Cheryl Cahoy and Sue Staehr, who were seated opposite her and completing a review of operations. Another of the men, identified as Erick Vela, turned right and entered the office of 29-year-old Lisa Bryant, a personal banker. The final man, identified as Jose Sandoval, who acted as the ringleader of the robbery, approached the counter, holding a 9mm pistol fitted with a laser sight in his right hand. At the counter was 37-year-old customer Evonne Tuttle, a divorced mother who had come to the bank to cash a $64 check. Behind the counter stood 50-year-old bank teller Samuel Sun, and behind him, another bank teller, 42-year-old Jo Mausbach, who was working at the drive-up window.

Based on surveillance camera footage, it is believed that Sandoval demanded money from Sun and Mausbach while Tuttle clasped her hands behind her neck. Sandoval laid his gun on the counter and pointed it at Sun. He then gestured for Mausbach to walk toward him, away from the drive-up window. Seconds after Mausbach moved forward, Sandoval opened fire, fatally shooting both Mausbach and Sun. A customer at the drive-up window, Diana Hladik, witnessed the shooting and drove off, dialing 911. Shouts were then heard from inside the bank, with someone yelling, "Who pulled the alarm?" At some point, a silent alarm had been triggered from behind the teller counter. As the shots rang out, Elwood stood up from her chair just as Galindo entered her office. Galindo fatally shot her three times. Bryant also rose from her desk and was shot in the leg by Vela, who then fatally shot her in the neck. Meanwhile, Sandoval pointed his gun at Tuttle and fatally shot her in the back. He then jumped over the counter as another customer, Micki Koepke, entered the lobby.

Koepke, having heard noise, initially assumed it was coming from nail guns at a nearby construction site. As she stepped into the lobby and saw Sandoval behind the counter, she immediately turned to run. Galindo fired three shots in her direction, shattering the glass windows behind her. Koepke was wounded by either flying glass or a bullet fragment but managed to reach her car and dial 911. The three robbers regrouped at the front door of the bank and quickly fled the scene without taking anything. In total, the crime lasted less than fifty seconds. Five surveillance cameras positioned throughout the bank captured the crime on video; however, no audio was recorded.

=== Capture ===
After hearing gunshots from inside the bank, Rodriguez, who had been the lookout and getaway driver, abandoned his partners and fled alone in the getaway car. Sandoval, Galindo, and Vela, upon exiting the bank, broke into a nearby house and confronted the home's residents. They stole their car, a Subaru Outback, and drove off. No one inside the home was injured. After driving for 10 miles, the trio ditched the car and stole a pickup truck. Authorities were able to track down the stolen car through its satellite navigation system. The trio was captured three hours after the murders in O'Neill. The men had stopped the stolen pickup truck at a gas station to fill up with gasoline and get food. Police surrounded the suspects and took them into custody. The murder weapons were later found on the roadside between Ewing and Clearwater, along the route police believed the suspects had traveled on.

At around midnight, police located Rodriguez and arrested him after locating the getaway car he had driven that had been spotted driving in a Norfolk neighborhood. All four men were then charged with first-degree murder.

== Victims ==
The five victims who were killed in the bank were:

- Lisa Bryant, 29, personal banker
- Lola Elwood, 43, assistant branch manager
- Jo Mausbach, 42, teller
- Samuel Sun, 50, teller coordinator
- Evonne Tuttle, 37, customer

== Aftermath ==
=== Suicide of Mark Zach ===
The day after the murders, 35-year-old Nebraska State Trooper Mark Zach, fatally shot himself with his service revolver at 1:00 p.m. in the afternoon just outside Norfolk. On September 19, a week before the murders, Zach had stopped Vela for a traffic violation. Zach arrested Vela on a concealed weapons charge, however, he was later released after posting bond. Zach transposed two digits when entering the gun's serial number into a police computer. Because of the mistake, the computer indicated that the weapon had not been stolen. Ultimately, the gun was confiscated by the police and was not used in the bank murders. Despite this, Zach apparently felt responsible for Vela not being held for a more serious stolen weapons charge. A spokesman later commented that it was difficult to know whether the stolen weapon charge would have resulted in a higher bond for Vela or whether he would have been in jail for longer. Zach was a 12-year veteran of the Nebraska State Patrol based in Norfolk. He was survived by a wife and six children, ranging in age from 4 to 15. The city later held a crisis intervention session for police, fire, and other emergency personnel.

=== Jose Sandoval's involvement in other murders ===
Prior to the Norfolk bank murders in September 2002, Jose Sandoval was also involved in two unrelated murders, which he supposedly committed in January and August 2002 respectively.

In the first case, 23-year-old Robert Pearson Jr. was reported missing in January 2002, and his body was not discovered until five years later in 2007. According to sources, the murder of Pearson was purportedly due to drug involvement and a debt owed in this case, but Sandoval was widely believed to have not acted alone in this killing. As for the second case, the victim in question was 19-year-old Travis Lundell, who was an ex-roommate of Sandoval. It was revealed that Sandoval, who killed Lundell alongside Jorge Galindo and Erick Vela, had made use of the murder to test or prove his accomplices' capability or allegiance for the bank robbery; court evidence showed that after Galindo recruited him into the robbery scheme, Vela had killed Lundell, with Galindo's abetment, in order to prove himself worthy of the robbery scheme.

== Trials ==
=== Erick Vela ===
Erick Vela

Erick Vela was the only person of the four to plead guilty to his involvement in the murders in June 2003; he pleaded no contest to five counts of first-degree murder and eight more lesser charges (including robbery). His trial and conviction took place earlier than both Sandoval and Galindo.

On September 22, 2003, the jury recommended the death penalty for Erick Vela.

On January 12, 2007, four years after his plea of guilt, 26-year-old Erick Vela was officially sentenced to death by a three-judge court, therefore becoming the third offender of the case to be sent to death row after both Galindo and Sandoval.

=== Jose Sandoval ===
Jose Sandoval

Jose Sandoval was the first of the four bank robbers to stand trial for the Norfolk bank murders.

On November 25, 2003, a Madison County jury found Sandoval guilty of all five counts of first-degree murder, after about 2 1/2 hours of deliberation.

On December 2, 2003, the jury recommended the death penalty for Sandoval on all five counts of first-degree murder.

On January 14, 2005, two years after the jury's recommendation, 25-year-old Jose Sandoval was formally sentenced to death by a three-judge trial court as the ringleader of the murders, chronologically becoming the second man to be condemned to death row for the bank murder case, as one of his accomplices, Jorge Galindo, was sentenced to death before him despite being tried later than Sandoval. Apart from Sandoval's five death sentences, he also received 246 years in prison for lesser charges of using a firearm to commit the murders, and under Nebraska state law, the death penalty carries an automatic appeal to the Nebraska Supreme Court.

In a separate trial, Sandoval pleaded guilty to the unrelated murders of Robert Pearson Jr. and Travis Lundell, and sentenced to double life sentences for these cases.

=== Jorge Galindo ===
Jorge Galindo

Jorge Galindo was the second to be put on trial for the bank murders.

On December 17, 2003, the jury found Galindo guilty as charged for all five murder counts in the first degree.

On December 24, 2003, Galindo was sentenced to death upon the jury's unanimous recommendation for capital punishment. A three-judge trial court formally imposed the death penalty for Galindo on November 9, 2004.

=== Gabriel Rodriguez ===
Gabriel Rodriguez

Gabriel Rodriguez was the last of the four men to be tried for the Norfolk bank murders, and he was convicted of five first-degree murder charges and firearm-related counts on February 25, 2004.

On April 23, 2004, Rodriguez was sentenced to five consecutive life sentences for the murders.

== Appeal processes ==
=== Galindo ===
On October 9, 2009, the Nebraska Supreme Court dismissed Galindo's appeal.

On September 1, 2023, the Nebraska Supreme Court once again rejected another appeal from Galindo.

=== Sandoval ===
On July 30, 2010, Jose Sandoval's appeal against his death sentence was turned down by the Nebraska Supreme Court.

The following year, in 2011, the U.S. Supreme Court denied Sandoval's appeal. Since then, Sandoval did not file further appeals to oppose his death sentence, and also missed out the federal court system's designated one-year deadline on filing post-conviction appeals against his death sentence. In December 2017, the state of Nebraska planned to authorize an execution date for Sandoval, who was notified of the matter a month prior.

=== Rodriguez ===
On January 19, 2007, Gabriel Rodriguez's appeal against his conviction and sentence was denied by the Nebraska Supreme Court.

=== Vela ===
On July 21, 2017, the Nebraska Supreme Court rejected Vela's appeal against his death sentence.

On March 29, 2018, Erick Vela appealed to the federal courts in a bid to overturn his death sentence, and the appeal is likely still pending.

== Status of the condemned trio ==
As of 2025, Sandoval, Galindo, and Vela remain on death row at the Tecumseh State Correctional Institution, awaiting execution.

== See also ==
- Capital punishment in Nebraska
- List of death row inmates in the United States § Nebraska
- List of serial killers in the United States
- Blue Ridge Savings Bank murders
- Geronimo bank murders
