= Sorcery =

Sorcery commonly refers to:

- Magic (supernatural), the application of beliefs, rituals or actions employed to manipulate natural or supernatural beings and forces
  - Witchcraft, the use of supernatural powers of magic

Sorcery may also refer to:

== Arts and entertainment ==
- Magic in fiction, supernatural magic in works of fiction

=== Literature ===
- Sorcery!, a gamebook series by Steve Jackson
- Sourcery, a 1988 novel by Terry Pratchett

=== Music ===
- Sorcery (band), an American hard rock band
- Sorcery (Jack DeJohnette album), a 1974 albim by Jack DeJohnette
- Sorcery (Kataklysm album), a 1995 album by Kataklysm

=== Video games ===
- Sorcery (video game), a 2012 video game
- Sorcery! (video game), a video game series

=== Other uses in arts and entertainment ===
- Sorcery (film), a 2023 Chilean-Mexican-German film
- Sorcery 101, a webcomic by Kel McDonald

== Other uses ==
- Sorcery (horse) (1808–after 1832), British Thoroughbred racehorse
- Sorcery Creek, a stream in British Columbia, Canada
- Sorcery Ridge, a mountain ridge in British Columbia, Canada

== See also ==
- Sorcerer (disambiguation)
- Sorceress (disambiguation)
- Sortilege (disambiguation)
