= Target language =

Target language may refer to:

- Target language (computing), the computer language a language processor translates into
- Target language, the language being learnt in language education
- Target language (translation), the language a source is translated into

== See also ==
- Source language (disambiguation)
