= Sortilege =

Sortilege may refer to:

- Cleromancy, divination by casting lots
  - Sortes (ancient Rome)
- Sortilège (band), a French heavy metal band
  - Sortilège (EP), 1983
- Sortilège, a Canadian maple liqueur brand
- Sortilège, a fictional character in the novel Inherent Vice
- Sortilège, a Belgian comic book series by Malik
- Sortilèges (film), a 1945 French horror drama film

== See also ==
- Sorcery (disambiguation)
- L'enfant et les sortilèges, a 1925 opera by Maurice Ravel
- Guillaume et les sortilèges, a 2007 French drama film
- Sortilegio, a Mexican telenovela
