= Todd Kohlhepp =

American serial killer (born 1971)

- Kohlhepp's SCDC Inmate Photo, 2017
- Born: Todd Christopher Sampsell; March 7, 1971 (age 55); Fort Lauderdale, Florida, U.S.
- Occupation: Realtor
- Status: Incarcerated
- Convictions: Arizona; Kidnapping; South Carolina; Murder (7 counts); Kidnapping (3 counts); First degree criminal sexual conduct
- Penalty: Arizona; 15 years South Carolina; Life imprisonment without parole

Details
- Victims: 7 killed (confirmed); 2 survivors (possibly more crimes)
- Span of crimes: November 25, 1986; November 7, 2003 – August 31, 2016
- Country: United States
- States: South Carolina; Arizona
- Date apprehended: November 3, 2016
- Imprisoned at: Broad River Correctional Institution (Columbia, South Carolina)

Todd Christopher Kohlhepp (né Sampsell; born March 7, 1971) is an American serial killer, mass murderer, serial rapist, animal abuser, and kidnapper who was convicted of murdering seven people in Spartanburg County, South Carolina, between 2003 and 2016. In addition, Kohlhepp kidnapped and raped at least two women and claims to have killed many more.

== Early life ==
Todd Christopher Sampsell was born on March 7, 1971, in Florida and was raised in South Carolina and Georgia. His parents divorced when he was two years old. His mother gained custody and married another man the following year. Later psychological reports found that Kohlhepp had an unhealthy relationship with his stepfather and often wanted to live with his biological father, whom he had not seen in eight years.

Kohlhepp was described as a troublesome child. In nursery school, he was known to be aggressive toward other children and would destroy their property. At the age of nine, when he started undergoing counseling, Kohlhepp was described as being "explosive" and "preoccupied with sexual content." He also displayed cruelty to animals, shooting a dog with a BB gun and killing a goldfish using Clorox bleach.

Kohlhepp's father later said the only emotions his son was capable of were anger and madness. Kohlhepp spent three and a half months in a Georgia psychiatric hospital as an inpatient because of his inability to get along with other children.

Eventually, in 1983, Kohlhepp was sent to live with his biological father in Arizona after his mother and stepfather separated. He took his father's surname and began working a number of local jobs. He also inherited his father's hobby of collecting weapons and was taught by him to "blow things up and make bombs." Despite this, their relationship deteriorated due to his father's absence with a number of girlfriends, and Kohlhepp repeatedly expressed a desire to return to his mother, though she reportedly made excuses to extend his stay.

=== 1987 kidnapping conviction ===
On November 25, 1986, 15-year-old Kohlhepp kidnapped 14-year-old Kristie Granado in Tempe, Arizona. He threatened her with a .22-caliber revolver, brought her back to his home, tied her up, taped her mouth shut, and raped her. Afterward, he walked her home and threatened to kill her entire family if she told anyone about what had happened. Kohlhepp was charged with kidnapping, sexual assault, and committing a dangerous crime against children.

In 1987, he pleaded guilty to the kidnapping charge, and the other charges were dropped. He was sentenced to 15 years in prison and registered as a sex offender. According to court records, Kohlhepp was diagnosed with borderline personality disorder and was noted as having an above-average IQ of 118 (percentile rank 88.5 at σ = 15).

The judge in the case said Kohlhepp was "very bright and should be advanced academically," but "behaviorally and emotionally dangerous" and likely could not be rehabilitated. Kohlhepp's probation officer wrote a similar description in court papers and added that Kohlhepp "felt the world owed him something." Kohlhepp's attorney in that case later went on to say that, when defending him, "he did not believe his client would go on to harm others" in the future. During his imprisonment, Kohlhepp was initially cited for violations that included some violent behavior; after turning twenty, however, he had no other records of disobedience.

== Release ==
In August 2001, Kohlhepp was released from prison after serving fourteen years and moved to South Carolina, where his mother was living. During his imprisonment, he attended and graduated from Central Arizona College with a bachelor's degree in computer science. From January 2002 to November 2003, he worked as a graphic designer for a company in Spartanburg. He began studying at Greenville Technical College in 2003. Kohlhepp transferred to the University of South Carolina Upstate the following year and graduated in 2008 with a Bachelor of Science degree in business administration-marketing.

Despite being registered as a sex offender, Kohlhepp was able to get a real estate license on June 30, 2006, after lying about the felony charge on his application. From this, he built a firm that had a dozen agents in its employ. He had been recognized as a top-selling agent in the Carolina region. The firm was closed down following his arrest. Kohlhepp also acquired a private pilot license and several properties out of state. In May 2014, he purchased nearly 100 acres (40 ha) of land, located in an area nine miles (fourteen kilometers) from the community of Moore, for $305,632. He then set up a fence, which cost $80,000, around the property.

A customer who sold her home to Kohlhepp remembered him as extremely outgoing and professional, but noted that he would often talk about his firearms and sometimes subtly use sexual innuendo during their conversations. Conversely, a woman who assisted one of Kohlhepp's employees described him as angry and condescending toward her partner. A banker who worked with Kohlhepp said he often watched pornographic videos, even at work.

Kohlhepp frequented a Waffle House restaurant in Roebuck, where his behavior disturbed the waitresses to the point where the male cook began to take Kohlhepp's orders for them. According to this employee, one of the waitresses was Meagan Leigh McCraw-Coxie, one of Kohlhepp's victims.

== Murders ==
=== Superbike Motorsports massacre ===
On November 6, 2003, a customer found two people shot dead inside and two outside Superbike Motorsports, a motorcycle shop in Chesnee. The victims were identified as owner Scott Ponder, 30; service manager Brian Lucas, 29; mechanic Chris Sherbert, 26; and bookkeeper Beverly Guy, 52, who was Ponder's mother. All four died from multiple gunshot wounds. Before Kohlhepp confessed to the shootings in 2016, investigators believed that the gunman, armed with a pistol, entered the shop from the back and killed Sherbert as he worked. He then killed Guy in the middle of the showroom, Lucas at the main doorway, and Ponder in the parking lot.

Eighteen shell casings from a 9mm gun were found at the scene; some were brass and others were nickel-plated. Over the years, 27 confiscated guns would be tested to check if they matched with the casings, and the casings were sent to England to see if new technology could find any fingerprints.

According to Ponder's widow, Kohlhepp was a disgruntled customer who had been in the shop several times. According to Kohlhepp's mother, he attempted to return a motorcycle there, but the employees laughed at him.

=== Murder of Charles Carver ===
On August 31, 2016, Kala Brown, 30, and her boyfriend Charles David Carver, 32, went missing after they went to remove brush from one of Kohlhepp's properties. Carver was later found dead of multiple gunshots on the property. Interest in the disappearance of Brown and Carver increased as a result of posts on Carver's Facebook account following their disappearance, the unusual nature of which prompted speculation that another party had taken control of his Facebook account.

On November 3, authorities found Brown chained to the wall inside a metal storage container on the property. Investigators had tracked her down after tracing the couple's last known cellphone signals, after which they heard banging noises coming from inside the container. A search of Kohlhepp's property recovered Carver's vehicle, which was found in a ravine covered in brush.

Brown said that she had seen Carver being shot by Kohlhepp. Kohlhepp's mother said Carver was killed for having a "really smart mouth," which Kohlhepp did not like. Kohlhepp also said he had kept Brown captive because she did not do anything wrong and that he did not want to hurt her. However, Brown told police just after her rescue that Kohlhepp had killed Carver because Kohlhepp was "mad at her." During her captivity, Brown was raped repeatedly and intimidated into not escaping after having been shown the graves of Kohlhepp's other victims.

=== Murder of Johnny and Meagan Coxie ===
Two bodies were discovered on Kohlhepp's property following his arrest, on November 6–7. They were later identified as husband and wife Johnny Joe Coxie, 29, and Meagan Leigh McCraw-Coxie, 26, residents of Spartanburg, who were reported missing on December 22, 2015. They had allegedly been hired by Kohlhepp to work on his property. McCraw-Coxie had been killed by a gunshot wound to the head on December 25 or 26, while Coxie had been killed a week earlier by a gunshot wound to the torso. According to the county coroner, they were identified through their extensive tattoos.

== List of known victims ==
Name	Sex	Age	Date of murder/disappearance
Kristie Granado (survived)	F	14	November 25, 1986
Scott Ponder	M	30	November 6, 2003
Brian Lucas	M	29	November 6, 2003
Chris Sherbert	M	26	November 6, 2003
Beverly Guy	F	52	November 6, 2003
Johnny Joe Coxie	M	29	December 19, 2015
Meagan Leigh McCraw-Coxie	F	26	December 25 or 26, 2015
Kala Brown (survived)	F	30	August 31, 2016
Charles David Carver	M	32	August 31, 2016

== Arrest and investigation ==
Kohlhepp was arrested shortly after Brown's rescue. He later confessed to the Chesnee shootings and the murders of the Coxies in exchange for being allowed to talk to his mother, give her a photograph, and transfer money to the college fund of a friend's child. While meeting with his mother, he reportedly confessed to the killings and kidnapping. When he confessed to the Chesnee shootings, Kohlhepp revealed details of the killings that had never been made public.

A search of Kohlhepp's property uncovered numerous weapons, including 9mm pistols fitted with suppressors, semi-automatic rifles, and an undetermined amount of ammunition. Because there was no record of a background check under Kohlhepp's name for the purchase of a firearm, investigators believe he likely acquired the weapons illegally.

Shortly after Kohlhepp's arrest, authorities in Spartanburg County discovered a number of seemingly joking product reviews for various items such as padlocks, shovels, tasers, and gun accessories on retail website Amazon.com written by a user known simply as "me". One review about a padlock stated, "solid locks.. have 5 on a shipping container.. wont stop them.. but sure will slow them down til they are too old to care." Another, written for a folding shovel, read, "keep in car for when you have to hide the bodies and you left the full size shovel at home.... does not come with a midget, which would have been nice." The reviewer's "wish list" page was listed as Todd Kohlhepp.

Following his arrest, Kohlhepp told his mother that there were many other victims than those known. When his mother asked how many, his response was, "You do not have enough fingers." During interrogation, he said he had shot a victim in Arizona. On November 18, 2016, it was reported that the Tempe Police Department had begun an investigation into Kohlhepp's claim, searching through unsolved homicides in the past three decades. They said they would focus on cases dated from 1983 to 1986, when Kohlhepp was living with his father, and also between August 2001, when Kohlhepp completed his sentence for kidnapping, and November 2001, when he moved back to South Carolina.

On November 25, 2016, police in Greer, South Carolina, announced that they had named Kohlhepp as a person of interest in an unsolved 2003 bank robbery and triple homicide at the local Blue Ridge Savings Bank that had taken place six months before the Chesnee shootings. However, as of May 16, 2018, no definitive link between Kohlhepp and the killings had been established; Kohlhepp denied any involvement in the case.

In December 2017, Kohlhepp wrote to the Spartanburg Herald-Journal claiming that he had more victims who had not been discovered.

== Legal proceedings and guilty pleas ==
Kohlhepp was charged with four counts of murder in relation to the Chesnee shootings and one count of kidnapping in relation to Brown's abduction. He was later charged with three additional counts of murder for the murders of Carver and the Coxies, along with one additional count of kidnapping and three counts of possession of a weapon during the commission of a violent crime. Kohlhepp's next court appearance was scheduled for January 19, 2017, where Kohlhepp's attorney waived their right to appearance.

According to a report by WLTX, relatives of the Chesnee shooting victims filed a wrongful death lawsuit against him. On December 1, it was announced that Brown had also filed a civil lawsuit against him.

On May 26, 2017, Kohlhepp pleaded guilty to seven counts of murder, two counts of kidnapping, and one count of criminal sexual assault and was sentenced to seven consecutive life sentences without the possibility of parole in a plea bargain that spared him from capital punishment.

Kohlhepp has since repeatedly admitted that there were at least two other murders. As of August 2018, he had not given authorities the details. Kohlhepp is currently imprisoned at Broad River Correctional Institution.

In August 2020, some of Kohlhepp's belongings were auctioned, and the proceeds were donated to the victims' families.

== Dustan Lawson ==
Dustan Lawson, a man accused of buying firearms and silencers for Kohlhepp despite knowing he was a convicted felon, faced federal charges. Lawson admitted to buying at least 12 guns and five silencers from 2012 to 2016, lying that they were for himself. In 2018, he pleaded guilty to 36 federal firearm charges and was sentenced to eight years and three months in prison. Lawson served his sentence at Butner Medium I FCI. He was released on November 13, 2023.

== See also ==
- List of serial killers in the United States
- List of serial killers by number of victims
