= Sourcing =

Sourcing may refer to:

- Open-sourcing, the act of releasing previously proprietary software under an open source/free software license
- Journalism sourcing, the practice of identifying a person or publication that gives information
- Power sourcing equipment, network devices that will provide power in a Power over Ethernet (PoE) setup
- Single sourcing, the reuse of content in publishing
- Sourcing (personnel), the practice of recruiting talent
- Procurement, the sourcing and acquisition of goods or services

== See also ==
- Outsourcing
- Source (disambiguation)
