= Nikko Jenkins =

American murderer on death row (born 1986)

- Jenkins in an undated booking photo published by the Nebraska Department of Correctional Services
- Born: Nikko Allen Jenkins; September 16, 1986 (age 40); Denver, Colorado, U.S.
- Motive: Tendencies of antisocial personality disorder (psychological evaluation); Belief that he had to commit the murders at the command of the ancient serpent god Apophis (self-claimed); Robbery
- Convictions: First-degree murder (4 counts); Robbery (2 counts); Second-degree assault; Third-degree assault of a police officer; Use of a deadly weapon to commit a felony (5 counts); Possession of a deadly weapon by a felon (6 counts)
- Penalty: Four consecutive death sentences, plus 450 years in prison

Details
- Victims: 4
- Date: August 11–21, 2013
- Country: United States
- Location: Omaha, Nebraska
- Weapons: 12-gauge shotgun Hi-Point carbine
- Date apprehended: August 29, 2013
- Imprisoned at: Tecumseh State Correctional Institution

Nikko Allen Jenkins (sometimes spelled Nicholas on first name; born September 16, 1986) is an American spree killer convicted of four murders, committed in August 2013 over a ten-day period in Omaha, Nebraska. The murders occurred within a month after he had been released from prison after serving 10-and-a-half years of an 18 year sentence for a carjacking and assaults committed in prison. Jenkins was aided by family members in some of the murders and later stated that he had committed the killings at the command of the ancient serpent god Apophis. He was found competent to stand trial, found guilty of the four murders, and was sentenced to death in May 2017.

== Early life ==
Jenkins was born in Denver, Colorado to David A. Magee Sr. and Lori Jenkins. He is the second eldest of six siblings. Through his maternal family, Jenkins is of Omaha and African American descent. Lori had her first child at 16 with David, 31 at the time, who had been convicted of manslaughter in 1978, which was later set aside. Jenkins' parents never married and later filed protective orders against each other. David Magee later entered a relationship with Lori's cousin, Ida Levering; both alleged domestic violence by him.

Starting from an early age, Jenkins had a lengthy history of mental health and behavioral issues. In 1993, while attending Highland Elementary School in Omaha, then-7-year-old Jenkins was temporarily removed from the custody of his mother after he brought a loaded .25 caliber handgun to school. In 1995, Jenkins was treated at Richard Young Center and prescribed Ritalin. At age 11, Jenkins was accused of theft, subsequently admitting to stealing on three occasions. He began skipping school around the same time, leading to placement in a group home in Papillion, Nebraska. He frequently assaulted other children and was expelled from the home in February 1998, following an incident in which Jenkins whipped another child with a clothes hanger.

Throughout his teens, Jenkins switched custody between his parents and a state-run youth detention center, beginning after Jenkins, aged 12, attacked someone with a knife. Following a series of escapes, Jenkins had his probation revoked and in August 2001, he was sent to Youth Rehabilitation and Treatment Center - Kearney. In 2002, he was returned to his family, with Jenkins' father reporting his son for threatening him with a shotgun shortly after. The same year, Jenkins committed two armed carjackings and in 2003, aged 16, he was sentenced to 18 years imprisonment.

== First incarceration ==
Between 2004 and 2012, Jenkins was disciplined on 71 occasions for violations, including assaulting other inmates, destruction of property, drug use, prison tattooing, gang activity, possession of contraband, and crafting a shiv from a toilet brush. Jenkins was also charged for participating in a prison riot.

In 2009, his father died while Jenkins was imprisoned. That same year, Nikko Jenkins and Erica Jenkins, his sister who was also imprisoned at the time, were granted furlough with corrections officers to accompany them to their grandmother's funeral. During the funeral, after a guard uncuffed one of Jenkins's hands so he could use the restroom, Jenkins and his sister attacked the guard but were both restrained.

In 2010, following Jenkins' attack on a correctional officer, Jenkins first made claims of having mental illness after making an insanity plea. During talks with a psychiatrist at Douglas County Correctional Center, Jenkins placed blame for his issues on childhood abuse and claimed to hear "voices from Egyptian gods". Jenkins stated the voices stopped when he was prescribed Risperidone and Depakote, but he eventually refused to take medication, claiming prison staff were poisoning him. The psychiatrist concluded Jenkins had antisocial personality disorder and was feigning psychotic symptoms, noting how Jenkins would "escalate his descriptions" when questioned. A different psychiatrist who testified at Jenkins' murder trial believed Jenkins' claims of psychosis because he had told the psychiatrist in 2011 of plans to kill people.

In 2011, based on self-reported symptoms, Jenkins was diagnosed with a nonspecific psychosis and noted for antisocial and narcissistic personality traits, with the possibility for either bipolar affective disorder with psychotic features or grandiose-type delusional disorder, as well as probable post-traumatic stress disorder, relational disorder and polysubstance dependence to THC, PCP, and alcohol. In 2012, staff at Tecumseh State Correctional Institution, based on the self-reported symptoms and interactions between Jenkins and his family, ruled out any psychotic disorders, including dissociative personality disorder, bipolar disorder, schizoaffective disorder, and denied a post-traumatic stress disorder for lack of criteria, instead also supporting a likely antisocial personality disorder. Jenkins himself insisted he had "schizophrenia, bipolar, and PTSD", but refused medication or counselling unless he was released on parole. Tecumseh staff noted that during family visits, Jenkins appeared "clear minded and goal oriented", as well as "demanding, berat[ing], and belittl[ing]" towards his fiancée and mother, whom he instructed in the filing of complaints and appeals on his behalf, the monitoring of staff, and the transfer of money to his prison account. During the same meetings, Jenkins talked at length about the mental health services he wanted to obtain for psychosis and hypomania, stating he intended to receive housing and live off disability benefits, referring to his presentation of mental illness as a "skit".

On July 30, 2013, Jenkins was released from prison.

== Murders ==
At about 5:01 a.m. on August 11, 2013, a patrol officer discovered two bodies in a white Ford pickup truck parked near a city swimming pool at 18th and F St, in Spring Lake Park. The two victims, identified as Juan Uribe-Pena and Jorge C. Cajiga-Ruiz, had each been shot once in the head by a shotgun, and their pockets turned inside out. They were lured to meet two women for a sexual encounter.

On August 19, around 7 a.m., the body of Curtis Bradford was found outside a detached garage at 18th and Clark Street by a man returning home from a night shift at a convenience store. Investigators arrived to find one revolver wound and one shotgun slug wound in the back of Bradford's head. It was later revealed that Bradford and Jenkins had met in prison and posed for a Facebook photo within 24 hours of Bradford’s murder. Bradford was the only one of Jenkins’ victims he had any relation with. It is believed that Nikko and Erica lured Bradford out by telling him that they wanted to do a robbery with him before shooting him in the back of the head. It is also believed that Erica wanted him dead because his friends previously shot at her house.

Jenkins' fourth and final victim, Andrea Kruger, a mother of three, was discovered on August 21, at about 2:15 a.m., by a deputy sheriff responding to a shots-fired call. Her body was found lying in the road at 168th and Fort St., with four 9mm gunshot wounds, two to the face, one to the neck, and one to the shoulder/back. Kruger had been returning home after a bartending shift near 178th and Pacific Street. Surveillance footage showed her locking up the Deja Vu Lounge at 1:47 a.m. At 6:30 that evening, Kruger's gold 2012 Chevrolet Traverse SUV was found abandoned 12 miles (19 km) away in an alley at 43rd and Charles Street. Later that week, a news conference was held by Douglas County Sheriff Tim Dunning, in which he stated that investigators believed the SUV had been abandoned roughly 2.5 hours after being stolen, and that a "feeble attempt" had been made at setting the vehicle's interior ablaze.

=== Victims ===
No.	Date	Name	Age	Crime scene	Method	Relation	Ref.
1	August 11, 2013	Juan Uribe-Pena	26	Pick-up truck by swimming pool at Spring Lake Park, near 18th & F St	Shot in head	None	
2	August 11, 2013	Jorge C. Cajiga-Ruiz	29	Pick-up truck by swimming pool at Spring Lake Park, near 18th & F St	Shot in hand, which penetrated to the head	None	
3	August 19, 2013	Curtis Bradford	22	Near 18th & Clark St, outside detached garage	Shot twice in back of head	Met in prison	
4	August 21, 2013	Andrea Kruger	33	168th St near Fort St, middle of road	Multiple shots to face, neck and shoulder/back	None	

== Arrest ==
On August 29, 2013, Jenkins was arrested on an unrelated terroristic threats charge. By then, the evidence against him had mounted—investigators had the image of a female associate on surveillance footage at a local gun outlet buying the kind of distinctive ammunition (Brenneke Classic Magnum 12-gauge, commonly known as "deer slugs") that had been used to commit the killings. Additional footage had been pulled from cameras along the route to Kruger's abandoned SUV. On the evening of September 3, Jenkins confessed to all four murders during a rambling 8-hour interview. Jenkins told police that the acts were sacrifices to Apophis, a deity in the ancient Egyptian religion. He was charged with four counts of murder following the confession.

== Trial ==
In handwritten letters dated November 3, 2013, submitted to the Omaha World-Herald, prosecutors, and a judge, Jenkins said he wished to plead guilty to all counts in the four slayings and also said he would protect Apophis' kingdom with "animalistic savage brutality."

On February 19, 2014, Jenkins filed a federal lawsuit seeking $24.5 million from the State of Nebraska for wrongful release and saying his claims of hearing voices from Apophis were repeatedly ignored. Jenkins claimed his problems were caused by mental illness. He also alleged that he had a family history for mental illness and said a doctor at Tecumseh State Prison had diagnosed him with schizophrenia, bipolar disorder, and obsessive-compulsive disorder, though Jenkins affirmed he was opposed to taking medication. In the six-page handwritten filing, he stated his belief that being kept in solitary confinement worsened his schizophrenia and Jenkins also blamed corrections officials for the four killings. Several of Jenkins' former psychiatrists were in disagreement over whether Jenkins was competent to stand trial and discussed the remaining possibility of either schizophrenia or psychopathy, although there was a general consensus the defendant could still stand trial even if a mental disorder was recognized.

After being declared competent to stand trial, the proceedings against Jenkins commenced. Upon his request, Jenkins was allowed to represent himself at trial under the guidance of advisory attorneys. Throughout the trial, Jenkins maintained he acted under the command of Apophis. His courtroom antics included speaking in tongues, howling, and laughing as prosecutors recounted the details of his victims' deaths. On April 16, 2014, Judge Peter Bataillon found Nikko Jenkins guilty of all four murders. Throughout his trial and imprisonments, Jenkins also engaged in self mutilation numerous times, including injures to his face, tongue, and groin areas which required numerous stitches.

Jenkins was initially scheduled to be sentenced on August 11, 2014, but the date was delayed indefinitely following a hearing held to determine his competency in understanding the death penalty proceedings against him. On July 29, Judge Bataillon ordered Jenkins to be housed at the Lincoln Regional Center psychiatric hospital until doctors were satisfied with his condition. Officials at the Regional Center refused to house Jenkins due to inadequate security, but doctors agreed to treat him at a Lincoln prison. While in custody, Jenkins continued to engage in self-harm. In addition to cutting, he attempted to hang himself in January 2016 and in February, he swallowed at least seven keys stolen from a correctional officer, requiring surgical removal.

In May 2017, Jenkins was sentenced to death by a three-judge panel, which imposed four consecutive death sentences for the four murders. He was sentenced to an additional 450 years on weapons charges connected with the murders. On April 20, 2020, the Supreme Court refused to hear a federal appeal filed by Jenkins arguing against the death penalty based on his competency and mental status.

=== Accomplices and their fates ===
Six of Jenkins's family members were captured in late August 2013 in connection with the spree killings. They included three of Jenkins' siblings.

Erica Jenkins, Nikko Jenkins' sister, was sentenced to life in prison for also shooting Bradford in January 2015. While in custody, she changed her name to Elluminati Egoddess Enikko Prestige. An additional 20 to 40 years were added to the sentence following a 2019 assault on her cousin, who was also convicted in the murders, for a total of 163 to 247 years imprisonment along with the life sentence. She was given another 20 years in prison for another assault case at Nebraska Correctional Center for Women in 2024.

Lori Jenkins, Nikko Jenkins' mother, received two concurrent 10 year sentences in a federal prison as an accessory to murder for illegally purchasing the ammunition used in the murders in July 2014. An additional minimum of five years was added to the sentence in April 2015.

Christine Bordeaux, a cousin of the Jenkins, was sentenced to 20 years for robbery and conspiracy to commit robbery in connection with the murders in March 2016. She was also assaulted by Erica Jenkins while they were being held in the same cell. Erica was armed with a bike lock contained in a sock. Bordeaux became eligible for parole in September 2023.

Warren Levering, Nikko Jenkins' uncle, was sentenced to 40 years in prison for his role in the murder of Andrea Kruger in February 2016. He had pleaded no contest as part of a plea deal, which gave him 20 years each as an accessory to murder and for attempted robbery.

== Second incarceration ==
In May 2024, Jenkins' legal team filed a motion with the Douglas County District Court, asking for $50,000 to pay a mitigation specialist to examine Jenkins. The lawyers cited a recent incident in which Jenkins cut his neck open to remove a non-existent tumor as proof of a mental decline. In September of the same year, Jenkins requested a new trial, with his lawyers claiming that he had had a poor legal defense, who had not advised him on alternatives such as an insanity plea or invoking Jenkins' low IQ to prevent a death sentence. Jenkins himself had told the judge at the time that he denied these options because he was "smarter than that". The families of victims Curtis Bradford and Andrea Kruger criticised the legal team and called Jenkins an attention seeker, pointing out he had made similar requests in the prior years.

In March 2025, Jenkins asked Nebraska to set an execution date for him. Less than a month later, Jenkins retracted the request and said he wanted to continue his appeals. During the same court date, the court declined the previously requested funding for a mental health examination. Talks about Jenkins' mental state and intellectual capacity were renewed and as of October 2025, the Douglas County District Court was reassessing if an examination and new IQ tests were necessary. The motions were denied in January 2026.

== See also ==
- Capital punishment in Nebraska
- List of death row inmates in the United States § Nebraska
