= Sourceror =

Sourceror or sourcerer may refer to:

- Procurement officer, someone who sources goods
- Programmer, someone who works with source code
- Sourceror, a disassembler in the assembler Merlin
- Sourcerer, a type of wizard, especially featured in Terry Pratchett's novel Sourcery
- Sourcerer, a type of magic user in the video game Divinity: Original Sin II
- Sourcerer, a fictional character from the children's TV show ReBoot: The Guardian Code

== See also ==
- Sorcerer (disambiguation)
- Source (disambiguation)
