= The Source (Courbet) =

Painting by Gustave Courbet

- Nude-La Source (French), La Font
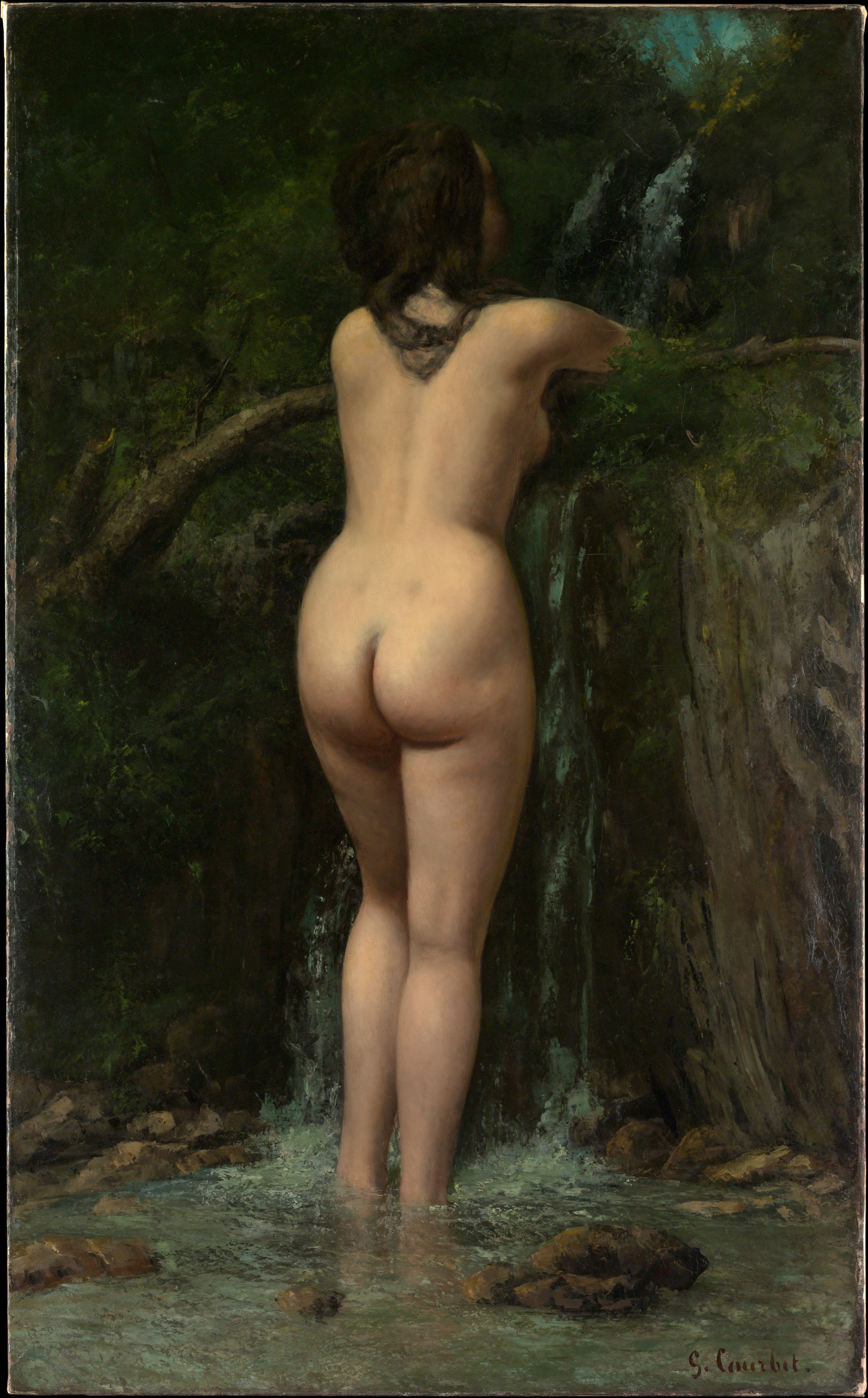
- Artist: Gustave Courbet
- Year: c. 1862
- Medium: Oil on canvas
- Dimensions: 120 cm × 74.3 cm (47 in × 29.3 in)
- Location: Metropolitan Museum of Art, New York City
- Accession: 29.100.58

The Source is an 1862 oil painting on canvas by the French realist painter Gustave Courbet. The painting shows a nude woman standing outside in nature, in a body of water.

== Description ==
The Source depicts a nude woman standing in front of a stream of water. In the painting the woman is reaching into the stream while it is flowing unto her arms. The identity of the woman in the painting is unknown. There was some speculation on whether or not the woman had previously modeled for Courbet. Some say she modeled for Courbet twice, others say she only modeled for Courbet one time.

== Inspiration ==
Many people believe that Courbet’s painting was inspired by the 1856 oil painting The Source by Jean-Auguste-Dominique Ingres. Both paintings show fully nude women and share similar nature scenes. Courbet’s painting has also been compared to The Moon and The Earth painting done by Paul Gauguin in 1893.

Courbet’s painting is in the Metropolitan Museum of Art.
