= Geronimo bank murders =

1984 mass murder during a bank robbery

- Geronimo (Oklahoma) Geronimo (the United States)
- Location: 34.4803°N 98.3831°W; Geronimo, Oklahoma, US
- Date: December 14, 1984
- Attack type: Mass murder, bank robbery
- Weapons: .32-caliber revolver Knife
- Deaths: 4
- Injuries: 3
- Perpetrator: Jay Wesley Neill
- Convictions: First degree murder (4 counts); Shooting with intent to kill (3 counts); Attempted shooting with intent to kill
- Sentence: Death (Neill); Life in prison without the possibility of parole (Johnson)

The Geronimo bank murders occurred on December 14, 1984, when Jay Wesley Neill killed four people during a bank robbery in Geronimo, Oklahoma. Neill was convicted and sentenced to death, and was executed in 2002. His co-conspirator, Robert Grady Johnson, was sentenced to life in prison without the possibility of parole.

== Background ==
Jay Wesley Neill 2000 mugshot

Jay Wesley Neill was born on April 9, 1965, and at 18-years-old he joined the United States Army in 1983. Neill met Robert Grady Johnson in February 1984 at a bar, and the two became romantically involved. He was discharged from the military in the summer of 1984 after disclosing that he was homosexual, and quickly began having financial difficulties.

Neill and Johnson shared an apartment in Lawton, Oklahoma, and a joint checking account at a bank in Geronimo, Oklahoma. The bank account had frequent checks returned due to insufficient funds, and they were frequently present at the Geronimo bank to work out their money problems. The Geronimo bank was a small facility, which was housed in a prefabricated building, and usually had only two tellers and no surveillance cameras or security guards. Neill commented to Johnson on more than one occasion on the absence of the security measures, and how easy he thought it would be to commit a robbery at the bank.

== Robbery ==
=== Preparation ===
On December 12, 1984, Neill shopped for firearms at a local pawnshop, but the shop keeper informed him that a buyer must be at least 21-years-old, and Neill was only 19-years-old at the time. The following day, Johnson applied for a gun license, and that same morning Neill went to a travel agent to purchase tickets for flights to Nassau, Bahamas leaving at 6 p.m. the next day. On the morning of December 14, Neill and Johnson returned to the pawn shop Neill had attempted buy a gun from two days earlier, and purchased a revolver Neill had seen during his previous visit.

=== Robbery and murders ===
At around 1 p.m. on December 14, Neill entered the First Bank of Chattanooga in Geronimo, and at gunpoint forced the three tellers working at the bank to the back room. The tellers, Kay Bruno (42), Jerri Bowles (19), and Joyce Mullenix (25) were told to lie face down on the floor, where Neill then stabbed them to death. The three employees were stabbed a total of 75 times, and Mullenix was six months pregnant.

While Neill was attempting the decapitation of one of the tellers, four customers entered the bank, who were taken to the back room by Neill and shot in the head. Ralph Zeller (33) died from his wounds, becoming the fourth and final murder victim. Bellen and Reuben Robles as well as Marilyn Roach would recover from their head wounds. Neill attempted to shoot the couple's 14-month-old daughter, Marie, but the gun was out of bullets. Johnson was 16 miles away from the crime scene as noted in the FBI report.

== Arrest and conviction ==
Neill and Johnson were arrested on December 17 in San Francisco, California. Marked bills stolen from the bank were used to pay for hotel rooms, limousine rides and shopping excursions. Bills worth around $3,700 were found on Neill and in their hotel room. Johnson was sentenced to four life sentences with the possibility of parole, despite there being a dispute whether or not Johnson was present in the bank at the time of the robbery. Neill testified that Johnson was at home waiting on him during the robbery, however, he had previously maintained that Johnson had accompanied him in the bank. Marilyn Roach testified to hearing the voices of two men inside the bank.

Neill was sentenced to death twice, once in 1985 and again in 1992. During the time of his incarceration, he converted to Christianity at first, and then to Buddhism. The first death sentence was overturned due to procedural errors.

While on death row, Neill's friendship with anyone was always doubtful and his conversion to Christianity was often the topic of conversation, as his "friends" were skeptical of the sincerity of his conversion even though he delivered mini-sermons and quoted Scripture often. Neill lived diagonally across from Ron Williamson (now a death row exoneree), and Neill once explained Williamson's mental behavior and problems in his letter to Williamson's sister, Renee. During his last days on death row, Neill described his spiritual journey since his incarceration; the letter concluded, "Above all, I enjoy the sharing of love, and positive thoughts. I’m as unjudgmental as I know how to be. I believe every person has an individual right to live their lives free of harm, and prejudice. I just wish I knew more about life when I was a confused 19-year-old – the age I was, when I committed this crime."

Johnson was sentenced to life in prison without the possibility of parole.

=== Execution ===
Neill's sentence appeal was denied by the U.S. Supreme Court on October 7, 2002, and he was executed by lethal injection on December 12. His final meal consisted of a double cheeseburger, fries, peach or cherry cobbler, a pint of vanilla ice cream and a large bottle of cran-grape juice. As he was on the gurney, he offered an apology to the families of Bruno, Bowles, Mullenix and Zeller, and to the Robleses, saying, "I want everyone to know I'm really sorry for what I did to you. I'm not sorry for dying here today. I'm not sorry because I'm lying here. I'm sorry for the horrible, horrible thing I did. I hope you find some comfort in that, to know Robert Johnson wasn't in that bank. I know you think he was, but he wasn't. Please forgive me." As he made that statement, his voice quivered and he complained of being dizzy before asking, "Are they starting?", then he prayed until he became unconscious, and Neill was pronounced dead at 6:18 p.m.

Jay Wesley Neill was the 54th person executed by the state of Oklahoma since resuming executions in 1990.

== See also ==
- Capital punishment in Oklahoma
- Capital punishment in the United States
- List of people executed in Oklahoma
- List of people executed in the United States in 2002
- Blue Ridge Savings Bank murders
- Norfolk bank murders
