= Father's Day bank massacre =

1991 bank robbery and shooting in Denver, Colorado

Coordinates: 39°44′37″N 104°59′7″W

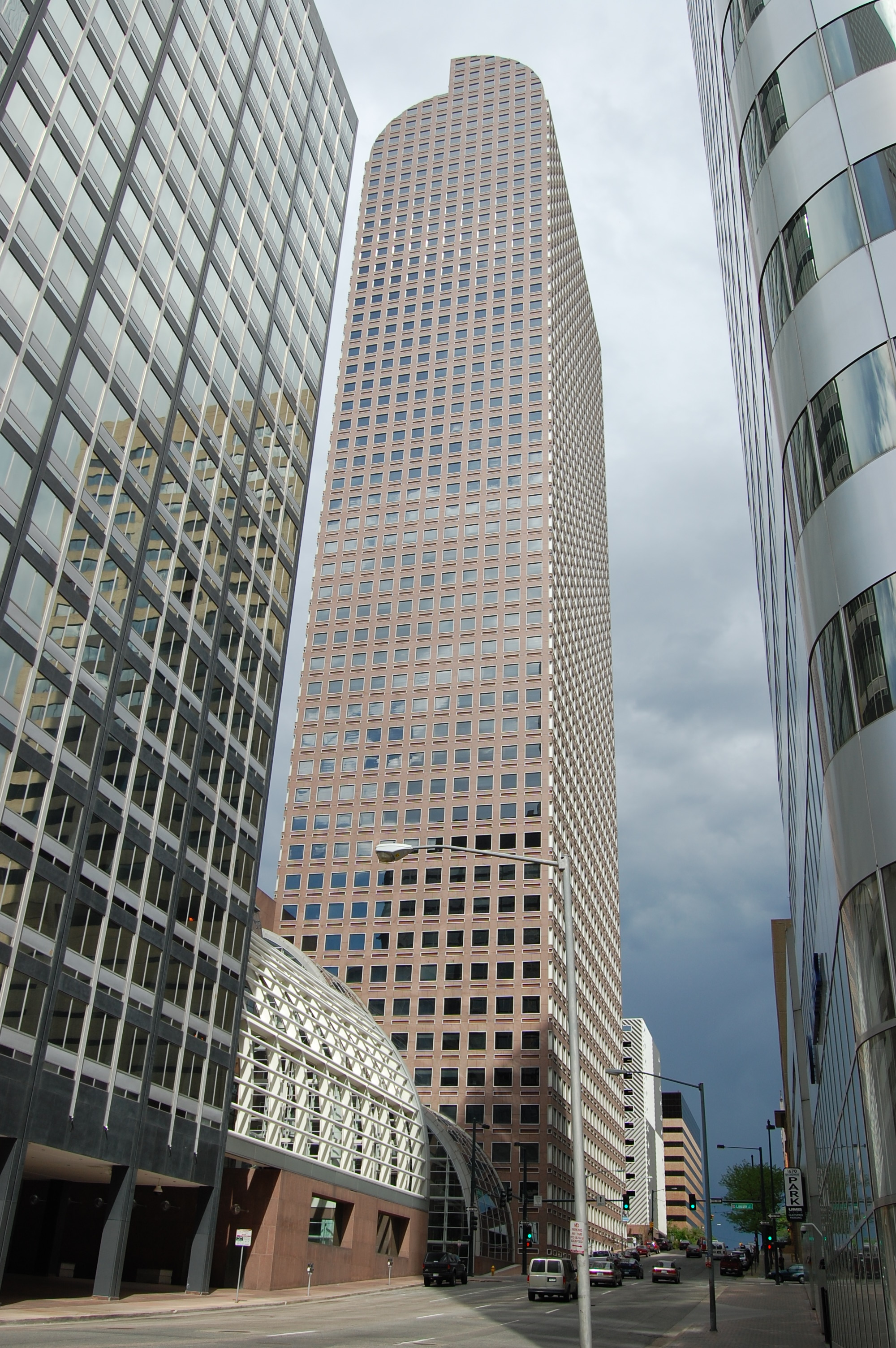
- Wells Fargo Center in Denver, site of the Father's Day bank massacre
- Location: Downtown, Denver, Colorado, U.S.
- Date: June 16, 1991; 9:14 a.m. – 9:56 a.m. (MDT)
- Attack type: Robbery; mass murder; mass shooting
- Weapon: .38-caliber Colt Trooper
- Deaths: 4
- Injuries: 0
- Perpetrator: Unknown
- Motive: Robbery
- Accused: James King
- Verdict: Not guilty

The Father's Day bank massacre was a bank robbery and shooting that took place on Sunday, June 16, 1991, at the United Bank Tower (now the Wells Fargo Center) in Denver, Colorado, United States. The perpetrator killed four unarmed bank guards and held up six tellers in the bank's cash vault. An estimated $200,000 was stolen from the bank. Nearly three weeks later, on July 4, 1991, authorities arrested retired police officer James W. King for the crime. The subsequent trial was broadcast nationally on Court TV. After days of deliberation, the jury acquitted King. None of the stolen money was ever found. The crime remains unsolved, though police cleared the case following the decision to charge King in 1991, as “investigators and prosecutors involved in the case believed the correct person had been charged.”

== Timeline of bank heist ==
=== Bank entry and murder of guards ===
The United Bank Tower had previously allowed its guards to be armed, but decided to change its policy less than a year before the robbery, requiring the guards to be unarmed.

At approximately 4 a.m. on Sunday, June 16, 1991 – Father's Day – an alarm went off in a basement storage room at the United Bank Tower. Records showed a guard in the control center turned off the alarm and took no further action. It is unknown if this incident had anything to do with the upcoming robbery.

At 9:14 a.m., a man identifying himself as Robert Bardwell, a vice president at the bank, asked for entry into the bank through a side freight elevator. He called the bank's guard room using a street-level security phone. Guard William McCullum Jr. responded by riding the elevator up from the guard room. When the elevator doors opened, the gunman forced McCullum to ride to the subbasement area of the bank. There, the gunman killed McCullum, hid his body in a storage room, and took his electric pass card. The killer made his way through the bank tunnels and up one floor to the bank's basement-level area, which housed the vault and guard station.

During the journey, the intruder set off an alarm at 9:20 a.m. when entering a stairwell. The intruder made his way into the vault area and first entered the guard room. There, the gunman forced two guards, Phillip Mankoff and Scott McCarthy, into a battery room, where both men were shot and killed. Investigators believed a third guard, Todd Wilson, returned to the area during or immediately after the shooting. Upon his return, Wilson was shot several feet away from the battery room where Mankoff and McCarthy lay. Upon investigation, police determined the shooter fired eighteen shots during the killing spree, hitting his victims with all except one of them. None of the four murdered bank guards were armed.

Before leaving the guard room and entering the vault area, the intruder removed and tampered with evidence so as to eliminate any trace of his identity. The perpetrator seized ten videotapes, bank keys, a two-way radio, and pages of the guard logbook.

=== Holdup of tellers and robbery ===
Electronic records indicated that the intruder opened the vault door at 9:48 a.m. At that time, six vault employees were on duty processing cash deliveries. The intruder demanded that the employees cover their eyes and lie on the floor. He ordered the senior vault manager, David Barranco, to fill a satchel with cash from the work stations. Before leaving the scene, the assailant forced the tellers to crawl into a small room near the vault—otherwise known as a mantrap. The robber made his escape at 9:56 a.m. according to electronic records, leaving the tellers locked in the mantrap. Using a broken spoon found on the mantrap's door sill, the tellers freed themselves approximately 20 minutes after the robbery.

Prior to leaving the scene, the robber collected all the spent shell casings that had been removed from his revolver after firing it. The only physical evidence he left behind was the eighteen bullets he fired. The surviving bank employees said the man appeared to be in his late 50s or 60s, wearing a gray sport coat, a white shirt, a multi-colored necktie, blue or gray slacks, a brown fedora hat and mirrored sunglasses, and had a bandage on his left cheek.

== Arrest and trial of James King ==
The ensuing police investigation involved more than forty FBI agents and two dozen detectives. Investigators were baffled as to why the robber never filled the entire satchel with cash, and only stole approximately $200,000 – a mere 10 % of the more than $2 million available in the cash room and vault. They also did not understand why he murdered the four guards, but left the other bank employees unharmed, since the guards were unarmed and did not present any more of a threat than the other employees at the scene. Police quickly determined the man could not have been bank Vice President Robert Bardwell, the name the robber used to gain entry at the freight elevator, as the real Bardwell was vacationing in the mountains with his family at the time.

From the beginning of the robbery investigation, authorities suspected that the killer was associated in some way with the bank. There was also some suspicion that the robber may have been a police officer due to having fired eighteen rounds, a standard load carried by officers on duty. Investigators questioned current and former bank employees until narrowing their search to James King, a retired Denver police officer and a former guard at the bank. After retiring from the Denver Police Department in 1986, King worked as a part-time guard at the bank between 1989 and 1990, leaving the job ten months before the robbery. King and his wife had declared bankruptcy a year after he retired from the force, and still had substantial debt in 1991, including $25,000 in credit card bills. King was arrested on the evening of July 4, 1991. A search of his house found no physical evidence connecting him to the robbery. The only suspicious things found were a detailed map of the bank building interior in a folder marked "plans", and five phony ID cards, containing King's picture with different aliases. These phony ID cards would be suppressed by a judge and not included as evidence in his trial, on grounds that it was never established King had ever used them in any illegal activity, nor could they be connected in any way to the robbery and murders.

A jury of seven men, five women and two alternates was chosen on the morning of May 19, 1992. The trial began the same day in the afternoon.

=== Prosecution case ===
Denver Deputy District Attorney Bill Buckley led the prosecution against King. The prosecution contended that several pieces of circumstantial and eyewitness evidence pointed to King's role in the crime. The arguments presented by the prosecution included:

- Five of the six surviving bank employees identified King as the robber. However, they picked him out of a photo lineup only on a second viewing, after the police had drawn a hat and sunglasses over the faces on the photos so they would resemble what the robber was wearing.
- A map of the bank building interior had been found in King's house, inside a folder labeled "plans".
- King had carried a .38 Colt Trooper as his service revolver when he was a police officer, which he kept after his retirement and had also used as his duty weapon when he worked at the bank. It was the same type of weapon used in the crime. Police had not found the weapon in King's house. When asked where it was, King said he disposed of it because of a cracked cylinder.
- Police also did not find King's Denver police department-issued gun belt or speedloaders in his house. King said he had gotten rid of them since he no longer needed them after leaving his job as a bank guard. When asked why he did not return them to the Denver Police Department when he retired, he said it was because no one there had told him to bring them back.
- King was a former employee of the bank and thus allegedly understood the security systems.
- King shaved his mustache after the crime.
- King purchased a larger safety deposit box the day after the crime.
- FBI Agent Lloyd Cubbison testified the stolen money measured up to be 1,009 cubic inches, almost the exact amount as the 1,000 cubic inch capacity of King's new safety deposit box, implying King had deliberately stolen a specific amount of money that would fit in the box. Defense attorney Walter Gerash objected to his testimony as "wishful thinking", pointing out this did not factor in other items police had found when they searched the box and the dimensions of the money did not match the dimensions of the box.
- When asked where he was during the robbery, King said he had gone to the Capitol Hill Community Center for a match with the Denver Chess Club. However, none of the employees there remembered seeing him or remembered anyone asking about a chess match that day, and the Denver Chess Club had not held matches at the Capitol Hill Community Center for years.
- Seventeen of the robber's eighteen shots hit his victims, implying that the robber was well trained with firearms.
- Bank Vice President Robert Bardwell, whose name had been used by the robber, testified he had previously lost his bank access card, which he had reported missing on August 13, 1990. James King had resigned from the bank on August 12, 1990. He also testified guards routinely patrolled by his office.
- The eighteen bullets fired at the crime scene came from five different brands of manufacturers. It was highly unusual for one gun used in one crime to fire so many different brands of bullets. In the Denver Police, it was a common practice for police to deposit spare rounds in "bullet buckets" and use those same buckets to load their duty weapons. Since King was a former Denver Police officer and the Denver Police used many different brands of ammo, this would explain why the robber's gun fired so many different ammo brands.

=== Defense case ===
Attorneys Walter Gerash and Scott Robinson defended King. The key elements of their case were:

- No physical evidence tied King to the crime. Neither the murder weapon nor any of the stolen money had ever been found.
- None of the witnesses to the crime reported the robber was wearing gloves, yet King's fingerprints were not found at the scene.
- The large safety deposit box King purchased after the crime was not found to contain anything incriminating.
- Eyewitness identification was unreliable. Robinson showed witnesses to the crime a picture of a man disguised with a hat, sunglasses, and a mustache, just like the robber. None of the witnesses could identify him. Robinson then revealed the man was famous actor Harrison Ford.
- James King had plainly visible moles on his face, yet none of the witnesses had mentioned moles in their initial descriptions of the robber to the police or to the police sketch artist.
- James Prado, the former head of bank security, testified that the mantrap had not been installed in the tower until after King had stopped working there, meaning he would not have known how to expertly manipulate it as the robber did. Prado also testified the map of the bank found in King's house was a standard map issued to all bank guards, and they were not required to return them upon leaving the job.
- Upon cross-examination, Robert Bardwell said he had never seen King before, and he had not worked weekends at the bank since 1989, which were the only days King worked at the bank. He also said he was not sure of the precise day he had lost his bank access card.
- A convicted bank robber named Dewey Calvin Baker had at one point confessed to reporters that he committed the crime, though he later recanted.
- Another alternate suspect was former bank guard Paul Yoccum, who had been tried and acquitted for stealing $30,000 from a United Bank ATM on Memorial Day weekend in 1990. He also lived less than a mile from the United Bank Tower. FBI agents William McMath and Charles Evans testified that when they went to investigate Yoccum's apartment, they found a closet door secured with handcuffs. Inside the closet, they found boxes of .38-caliber and .357-caliber ammunition, as well as a police scanner and speedloaders, batons, replicas of badges of several police organizations and dummy grenades. Yoccum had no alibi for the time the robbery took place.
- One of King's neighbors testified that she saw him mowing his lawn at the time the bank was robbed. She yelled a Father's Day greeting to him.

The defense made the unusual decision to put King on the witness stand, hoping his soft-spoken demeanor would convince jurors he was not a killer. Steven Epstein, author of the book Deadly Heist, said this strategy "may have backfired" as Buckley "scored numerous points on his cross-examination".

After 53 hours of jury deliberation, King was acquitted of all charges. After the trial, the FBI kept King under observation for years, hoping to find something they could charge him with that was not prevented by double jeopardy procedure, but they found nothing. King lived what was described as "a hermit's existence" at his home at 665 Juniper Street, in Golden, Colorado. He died of dementia at a nearby hospice on May 21, 2013, at the age of 77. His wife, who had stayed with him, predeceased him in 2009.

Four months after the verdict, Paul Yoccum died of a heart attack at age 52.

In 1997, King's attorney Walter Gerash, along with Phil Goodstein, published a book about the case, entitled Murders in the Bank Vault: The Father's Day Massacre and Trial of James King.

In 2025, the attorney and true crime author Steven Epstein published the book Deadly Heist, revisiting the crime and interviewing many of the participants in the investigation and trial.

== Victims ==
- Phillip Mankoff, age 41
- William McCullum Jr., age 33
- Scott McCarthy, age 21
- Todd Wilson, age 21
