= The Source (Etrog) =

Public art work by Sorel Etrog

Coordinates: 43°10′36.8″N 87°56′12.2″W

- Artist: Sorel Etrog
- Year: 1964
- Type: bronze
- Location: Lynden Sculpture Garden; Milwaukee, Wisconsin
- Owner: Bradley Family Foundation

The Source is a public art work by artist Sorel Etrog located at the Lynden Sculpture Garden near Milwaukee, Wisconsin. The sculpture's abstract form is horizontally oriented; it is installed on the lawn.
