= Sorcerer =

Sorcerer may refer to:

== Magic ==
- Sorcerer (supernatural), a practitioner of magic that derives from supernatural or occult sources
- Sorcerer (fantasy), a fictional character who uses or practices magic that derives from supernatural or occult sources

== Film and television ==
- The Sorceror (film), a 1932 German film
- The Sorcerers, a 1967 British science fiction horror film
- Sorcerer (film), a 1977 American thriller film
- Highlander III: The Sorcerer, a 1994 American fantasy action film
- Chapter Four: Sorcerer, Stranger Things episode

== Games ==
- Sorcerer (board game), a 1975 board wargame
- Sorcerer (Dungeons & Dragons), a character class in the game Dungeons & Dragons
- Sorcerer (pinball), a 1985 pinball machine
- Sorcerer (role-playing game), a 2002 tabletop role playing game made by Ron Edwards
- Sorcerer (video game), a 1984 interactive fiction computer game made by Infocom

== Music ==
- Sorcerer (band), a Swedish epic doom band from Stockholm
- Sorcerer (Miles Davis album), 1967
- Sorcerer (soundtrack), performed by Tangerine Dream for the film of the same name
- "Sorcerer" (Stevie Nicks song), a 1984 song used in the film Streets of Fire
- The Sorcerer, an 1877 comic opera by Gilbert and Sullivan
- The Sorcerer (album), a 1967 album by Gábor Szabó
- "The Sorcerer", a song by Herbie Hancock from his album Speak Like a Child

== Animals ==
- Sorcerer (horse) (1796–1821), British Thoroughbred racehorse
- Sorcerer (moth), of the family Noctuidae

== Computing ==
- Exidy Sorcerer, a home computer system released in 1978

== Other uses ==
- The Sorcerer (cave art), cave painting in 'The Sanctuary' cavern, Ariège, France
- The Dark Tower: The Sorcerer, a comic book
- The Sorceror, a 2002 fantasy novel by Troy Denning

== See also ==
- Sourceror (disambiguation)
- Sorceress (disambiguation)
- Sorcery (disambiguation)
- Magician (disambiguation)
- Warlock (disambiguation)
- Wizard (disambiguation)
- Witch (disambiguation)
