= Source language =

Source language may refer to:

- Source language (translation), the language a source is translated from
- Source code, text written in a computer programming language

== See also ==
- Source text
- Target language (disambiguation)
