= Vertex of a representation =

In mathematical finite group theory, the vertex of a representation of a finite group is a subgroup associated to it, that has a special representation called a source. Vertices and sources were introduced by Green (1958–1959).
