= Anthony Garcia (serial killer) =

American serial killer (born 1973)

- Born: Anthony Joseph Garcia; June 7, 1973 (age 53); Los Angeles, California, U.S.
- Motive: Revenge
- Conviction: First degree murder (4 counts)
- Penalty: Death

Details
- Victims: 4
- Span of crimes: 2008–2013
- Country: United States
- State: Nebraska
- Date apprehended: July 15, 2013
- Imprisoned at: Tecumseh State Correctional Institution, Tecumseh, Nebraska

Anthony Joseph Garcia (born June 7, 1973) is an American serial killer and former medical doctor who was convicted of two separate double murders, committed in 2008 and 2013 in Omaha, Nebraska. Garcia was arrested in July 2013 and went to trial in October 2016. He was found guilty on all counts, and later sentenced to death.

== Early life and medical employment ==
Garcia was born on June 7, 1973, in Los Angeles, California, to Fred, a postal service worker, and Estella, a Mexican native who was a nurse. He has two younger siblings.

Garcia received his medical degree from the University of Utah in 1999. He then began a residency at Bassett-St. Elizabeth Family Medicine program in Utica, NY where he remained for approximately six months before being forced to resign for "unprofessional and inappropriate conduct." The New York State Board of Professional Medical Conduct gave Garcia an administrative warning for his conduct on July 25, 2001, and said his name would be flagged if he applied for a state medical license in the future.

In July 2000, Garcia began another residency in the pathology department at the Creighton University Medical Center - Bergan Mercy in Omaha, Nebraska. He soon received poor written evaluations from his professor Dr. Chhanda Bewtra, who judged his attitude to be "passive/aggressive," stating that "Dr. Garcia showed marked lack of initiative and interest. He took no responsibility for his cases. His knowledge of basic histo(pathology) is very poor." She also made formal complaints against Garcia to Dr. William Hunter, who oversaw the pathology residency program, later testifying it was the first time she had recommended a pathology resident be suspended: "He was the worst resident in my 40 years of teaching. Not good. Right from the beginning he was adversarial, he did not like me. He was rude in the class, and he was quite disruptive in my class." Garcia responded to Bewtra's reviews with threats to sue, but never followed through. Hunter witnessed for himself Garcia's mishandling of an autopsy and documented his "belligerent and defensive" attitude in response to criticism in a memo in Garcia's file.

Bewtra later elaborated to reporters: "He had an attitude problem. He just did not want to learn. I thought he was arrogant; he was mean. He liked to hurt people and derive pleasure from there. And so he was not a nice person."

It was Garcia's "erratic behavior" that resulted in his termination within the year. He first caused a major incident when he placed an autopsied body facedown overnight, which "markedly distorted the face," resulting in a formal complaint to the university by a funeral director. Dr. Roger Brumback, Chair of the Pathology Department, wanted to terminate Garcia from the program, but the university was advised that its employment practices required placing Garcia on probation. Even though Garcia knew he was under review, he then called the wife of Dr. Hisham Hashish, a second-year resident, whom he had previously harassed and who was off taking a critical exam, telling her that the "pathology department" insisted her husband interrupt it to return and attend a mandatory meeting. The department was immediately notified of the call by both Dr. Hashish and his wife, and subsequent investigation uncovered personnel who had overheard Garcia plotting the call to derail Hashish's exam opportunity with another resident, Bryan Nguyen. Nguyen admitted he did nothing to stop Garcia, who was convinced that Hashish had previously used exams as an excuse to take time off, and was "very upset that he had left work for him to do." Despite Garcia's denials, both residents were immediately terminated on May 22, 2001, by Brumback and Hunter. Both were given the option to resign, but Garcia refused this and immediately filed an appeal. The appeal panel upheld his termination, stating the call to Hashish's home "represents unwarranted and unacceptable harassment and, as such, represents unethical conduct that damages and undermines the pathology program."

Despite his not having resigned, Hunter attempted to get Garcia another residency spot, even writing him a brief recommendation. Garcia moved on to the University of Illinois Chicago (UIC), where he worked from 2001 to 2003. He later told authorities that he left due to poor health, migraine headaches, and depression, moving back to his parents' home in Walnut, California.

Garcia was then hired by Dr. Anita Kablinger, then director of a psychiatry residency program at LSU Health Sciences Center Shreveport in Shreveport, Louisiana in July 2007. He remained there until early 2008, when the State Board of Medical Examiners informed him that he might not qualify for a medical license, due to the fact he had not reported his failure to finish the pathology programs at Creighton or UIC. They also notified Kablinger, who had concerns about his performance early on. She terminated him on February 27, 2008, for not revealing the disciplinary action taken against him at Creighton, which Dr. Hunter had verified, as well as the reasons for his termination. Garcia told her he was fired because his former bosses at Creighton were "racist against him."

Garcia left the next day. Two weeks later, Thomas Hunter, the eleven-year-old son of Dr. William Hunter, and Shirlee Sherman were murdered in the Hunters' home.

In December, Garcia applied for, and received, a temporary license to practice medicine in Indiana, until he withdrew his application. In 2009, Garcia was hired to work as a contract physician in Chicago.

In September 2012, he again applied for a medical license in Indiana, but when the Indiana Medical Licensing Board asked Creighton to verify his former employment, Brumback informed them that Garcia was dismissed for "unprofessional behavior." He was denied the license in December, due to failure to complete residencies in New York, Illinois and Louisiana, as well as Nebraska. Five months later, Garcia attempted to break into Dr. Bewtra's house in Omaha, and immediately after that thwarted attempt, proceeded to murder Dr. Roger Brumback and his wife, Mary.

== The Creighton murders ==
On March 13, 2008, about two weeks after Garcia left LSU, Dr. William Hunter arrived at his home in Dundee and found the bodies of his eleven-year-old son Thomas and 57-year-old housekeeper Shirlee Sherman, both of whom had been stabbed to death with knives apparently taken from the home's kitchen. Omaha police detectives Derek Mois and Scott Warner were assigned to the case. Witnesses described a heavy-set olive-skinned male in the vicinity, correlating him to a silver Honda CRV with an out-of-state license plate. Police produced a sketch of the man's face based on those descriptions.

Omaha police investigated the Hunter family including Thomas' online gaming presence but found no leads. Additionally, detectives investigated Shirlee Sherman and her family, theorizing that she may have been the intended target, but also found no viable suspects. They also investigated another stabbing that had occurred in the area, but detectives could not find a connection between the suspect in that case and the murders at the Hunter home. Shirlee Sherman's family offered a $50,000 reward for information on the case and also hired a private investigator. However, a year after the murders, the case went cold.

On May 14, 2013, piano mover Jason Peterson and his crew arrived at the home of Roger and Mary Brumback. Initially thinking no one was home, one mover then noted a handgun magazine lying in the home's open doorway and the police were called. Peterson later told reporters that he saw Roger Brumback's body in the home, but no blood.

Coincidentally, detectives Mois and Warner were dispatched to the Brumback home. They found that Roger had multiple gunshot wounds and a stab wound to his neck, and Mary had been stabbed to death, apparently with knives taken from the home's kitchen. Mois later stated that he and his partner immediately thought that the murders were similar to those at the Hunter home, and their suspicion of a connection between the crimes was reinforced when police learned that Dr. Brumback had been a colleague of Dr. Hunter. Additionally, it was determined that the couple had been dead for a day or two. Reporter Todd Cooper noted that the Brumbacks were last seen and heard from the previous Sunday, Mother's Day, during an online chat with their daughter.

Additionally, four days after the Brumback murders, Dr. Chhanda Bewtra reported that someone had attempted to break into her home on Mother's Day. She and her husband were not home at the time, and she noted that nothing was missing. Police surmised that the intruder was scared off by the home's alarm system.

== Investigations and arrest ==
After the Brumback murders, it was theorized that the attempted break-in at the Bewtra home was connected to the double homicides. Mois came upon Garcia's file and saw that Garcia's dismissal from Creighton had interfered with his ability to get employment or licensure in other states, and surmised that Garcia had enough motive to harm all three doctors. Because the murder of the vulnerable eleven-year-old Thomas Hunter occurred in the afternoon, at an hour that neither Hunter nor his cardiologist wife would be home, the Hunter family believe the boy's murder was deliberately planned to inflict pain on the boy's father.

Mois then confirmed that shortly before the Brumback murders, Garcia, now living in Terre Haute, Indiana, had purchased a firearm that would fit the magazine found at the Brumback home. Also, Garcia's credit card had been used twice in the area near the Brumback murders on that Mother's Day, and Garcia's phone showed a search for the Brumback address only a few minutes after the alarm sounded at the Bewtra home.

Omaha detectives coordinated with Indiana law enforcement and the FBI to track Garcia. On July 15, he was arrested on a highway in Union County, Illinois. As his blood alcohol level was twice the legal limit, Garcia was immediately charged with DUI. When officers searched his car, they found a .45 caliber handgun, 50 bullets, an LSU lab coat, and a stethoscope. Nebraska authorities then took him into custody and charged Garcia with four counts of first-degree murder and use of a handgun. The State of Illinois suspended his medical license within days of his arrest.

== Trial, conviction, sentencing ==
Garcia's trial was originally scheduled for April 2016. Douglas County Attorneys Don Kleine and Brenda Beadle prosecuted the case. Defense counsel comprised Chicago-based lead attorney Bob Motta Jr., his wife Alison Motta, father Robert Motta Sr., and local attorney Jeremy Jorgenson. However, on the eve of jury selection, Judge Gary Randall made a controversial decision to remove Alison Motta by revoking the court's permission for her to participate in Garcia's defense for violating a pre-trial publicity order by making public statements to TV stations and reporters about the supposed existence of exculpatory DNA evidence from two people, in what he considered an overt attempt to "poison the jury pool." When the Mottas appealed, Garcia, who wanted a trial and not yet another delay, withdrew completely and stopped communicating with them.

The trial finally began on October 3. Prosecutors showed evidence from Garcia's home including a trash bag in the kitchen sink, in which were his termination letter from Creighton and handwritten notes with a "to-do" list that included such items as "put tape on your fingers" and "buy common shoes." Investigators also found that when Garcia was in Louisiana, he had owned a silver Honda CRV with a license plate fitting the description of the car seen around the Hunter home at the time of the first killings. In addition, his saliva sample matched DNA left behind by the intruder who had tried to break into the Bewtra house on the day the Brumbacks were killed.

Prosecutors also called a former stripper from Terre Haute, Cecilia Hoffman, who said that four years after the Dundee murders, when Garcia had tried to pursue her romantically, she attempted to rebuff him by saying that she only dated "bad boys." According to her statements, Garcia responded by saying that he had "killed a young boy and an old woman." Motta responded by noting that she had admitted to drinking the day of her conversation with the police about the incident, but Hoffman denied being drunk.

Prosecutors also pointed out that the four victims had been stabbed in a similar manner and that the gun found in Garcia's car matched the type of handgun magazine that had been left behind at the Brumback crime scene. Throughout a majority of the proceedings, Garcia wore headphones and appeared to be asleep.

On October 26, 2016, Garcia was convicted on nine counts; four counts of first-degree murder, four counts of use of a deadly weapon to commit a felony, and one count of felony burglary. The Mottas withdrew from the case before sentencing, leaving Garcia with a public defender. Sentencing was initially delayed, as the state of Nebraska was set to vote on whether to repeal or retain the death penalty. In November of that year, the state voted to retain the death penalty, and in September 2018, a three-judge panel sentenced Garcia to death.

== After conviction ==
Garcia remained on death row at the Tecumseh State Correctional Institution in Tecumseh. In November 2022, the public defender's office began attempts to appeal his sentencing and by March 2023 had filed a motion for a new trial, calling his previous attorneys "a nightmare." In his appeal, Garcia noted 130 alleged errors made during his trial that involved 15 topics, including motions to suppress, DNA and digital evidence, ineffective counsel, and constitutionality of the death penalty. Garcia also claimed that his counsel was ineffective for “failing to seek a third competency hearing when he stopped communicating with his counsel prior to trial.” He described himself as having a “diminished capacity.” On Friday, Sept. 8th, 2023, the Nebraska Supreme Court rejected his appeal for a new trial. The court ruled that, “We cannot determine on direct appeal whether counsel was ineffective in certain regards. We otherwise affirm Garcia's convictions and sentences.”

In 2014, detectives Derek Mois, Scott Warner, Ryan Davis, and Nick Herfordt were named Crime Stoppers Officer of the Year for their work on the Garcia case.

In 2010, Creighton University unveiled a memorial to Thomas Hunter, installed on the southeast lawn of the school's Cardiac Center. In 2023, the statue was moved near the CL Rachel and Werner Center.

48 Hours reported on the case in the 2017 episode "Resident Evil". Dateline reported on the case in a two-hour 2017 episode, "Haunting". A fictionalized version of the case was included in the true crime series, James Patterson's Murder is Forever, on the Investigation Discovery channel.

== See also ==
- Capital punishment in Nebraska
- List of death row inmates in the United States § Nebraska
- List of serial killers in the United States
