= List of people executed in the United States in 2019 =

Twenty-two people, all male, were executed in the United States in 2019, twenty by lethal injection and two, in Tennessee, by electrocution.

== List of people executed in the United States in 2019 ==
No.	Date of execution	Name	Age of person			Gender	Ethnicity	State	Method	Ref.
No.	Date of execution	Name	At execution	At offense	Age difference	Gender	Ethnicity	State	Method	Ref.
1	January 30, 2019	Robert Mitchell Jennings	61	30	31	Male	Black	Texas	Lethal injection	
2	February 7, 2019	Domineque Hakim Marcelle Ray	42	19	23	Male	Black	Alabama	Lethal injection	
3	February 28, 2019	Billie Wayne Coble	70	40	30	Male	White	Texas	Lethal injection	
4	April 24, 2019	John William King	44	23	21	Male	White	Texas	Lethal injection	
5	May 2, 2019	Scotty Garnell Morrow	52	27	25	Male	Black	Georgia	Lethal injection	
6	May 16, 2019	Michael Brandon Samra	41	19	22	Male	White	Alabama	Lethal injection	
7	May 16, 2019	Donnie Edward Johnson	68	33	35	Male	White	Tennessee	Lethal injection	
8	May 23, 2019	Robert Joseph "Bobby Joe" Long	65	30	35	Male	White	Florida	Lethal injection	
9	May 30, 2019	Christopher Lee Price	46	19	27	Male	White	Alabama	Lethal injection	
10	June 20, 2019	Marion Wilson Jr.	42	19	23	Male	Black	Georgia	Lethal injection	
11	August 15, 2019	Stephen Michael West	56	23	33	Male	White	Tennessee	Electrocution	
12	August 21, 2019	Larry Ray Swearingen	48	27	21	Male	White	Texas	Lethal injection	
13	August 22, 2019	Gary Ray Bowles	57	32	25	Male	White	Florida	Lethal injection	
14	September 4, 2019	Billy Jack Crutsinger	64	48	16	Male	White	Texas	Lethal injection	
15	September 10, 2019	Mark Anthony Soliz	37	28	9	Male	Hispanic	Texas	Lethal injection	
16	September 25, 2019	Robert Sparks	45	33	12	Male	Black	Texas	Lethal injection	
17	October 1, 2019	Russell Earl Bucklew	51	27	24	Male	White	Missouri	Lethal injection	
18	November 4, 2019	Charles Russell Rhines	63	35	28	Male	White	South Dakota	Lethal injection	
19	November 6, 2019	Justen Grant Hall	38	21	17	Male	White	Texas	Lethal injection	
20	November 13, 2019	Ray Jefferson Cromartie	52	27	25	Male	Black	Georgia	Lethal injection	
21	December 5, 2019	Leroy Hall Jr.	53	24	29	Male	White	Tennessee	Electrocution	
22	December 11, 2019	Travis Trevino Runnels	46	30	16	Male	Black	Texas	Lethal injection	
		Average:	52 years	28 years	24 years					

== Demographics ==
Gender
Male	22	100%
Female	0	0%
Ethnicity
White	14	64%
Black	7	31%
Hispanic	1	5%
State
Texas	9	41%
Alabama	3	14%
Georgia	3	14%
Tennessee	3	14%
Florida	2	9%
Missouri	1	5%
South Dakota	1	5%
Method
Lethal injection	20	91%
Electrocution	2	9%
Month
January	1	5%
February	2	9%
March	0	0%
April	1	5%
May	5	23%
June	1	5%
July	0	0%
August	3	14%
September	3	14%
October	1	5%
November	3	14%
December	2	9%
Age
30–39	2	9%
40–49	8	36%
50–59	6	27%
60–69	5	22%
70–79	1	5%
Total	22	100%

== Executions in recent years ==
Number of executions
2020	17
2019	22
2018	25
Total	64

== See also ==
- List of death row inmates in the United States
- List of exonerated death row inmates § 2019
- List of juveniles executed in the United States since 1976
- List of most recent executions by jurisdiction
- List of women executed in the United States since 1976

Preceded by 2018	List of people executed in the United States in 2019	Succeeded by 2020
