= List of most recent executions by jurisdiction =

Capital punishment is retained in law by 55 UN member states or observer states, with 140 having abolished it in law or in practice. The most recent legal executions performed by nations and other entities with criminal law jurisdiction over the people present within its boundaries are listed below. Extrajudicial executions and killings are not included. In general, executions carried out in the territory of a sovereign state when it was a colony or before the sovereign state gained independence are not included. The colours on the map correspond to and have the same meanings as the colours in the charts.

== Legend ==
D	Maintain the death penalty in both law and practice
C	Abolished in practice (no execution in over 10 years or under a moratorium)
B	Abolished in law, except in exceptional circumstances, such as war
A	Completely abolished

== Africa ==
#	Country	Last execution date	Name	Crime	Method
C	Algeria	August 1993	seven unnamed Islamic terrorists	terrorism	firing squad
A	Angola	27 May 1977	Nito Alves and many of his supporters	treason	firing squad
A	Benin	23 September 1987		murder	
A	Bophuthatswana	13 December 1990	Alpheus Sekoboane	murder	hanging
D	Botswana	11 June 2021	Phemelo Botogeleng	murder	hanging
B	Burkina Faso	19 September 1988	Jean-Baptiste Boukary Lingani, Henri Zongo and 2 other unnamed men	treason	firing squad
A	Burundi	2000	2 soldiers	murder	
C	Cameroon	9 January 1997	Antoine Vandi Tize	murder	firing squad
A	Cape Verde	1835			
A	Central African Republic	January 1981	six unnamed officials		firing squad
A	Chad	29 August 2015	Mahamat Mustapha and nine unnamed men	terrorism	firearm
A	Ciskei	never used			
C	Comoros	29 May 1997	Mohamed Saidali	armed robbery	firing squad
A	Congo	October 1982	2 men	murder	firing squad
A	Djibouti	none since independence on 27 June 1977			
C	DR Congo	2003	unnamed soldier		firearm
D	Egypt	1 August 2026	Nehru Abdel-Moneim Tawfiq	premeditated murder	hanging
B	Equatorial Guinea	January 2014	9 unnamed people		firearm
C	Eritrea	none since independence on 24 May 1993			
C	Eswatini	2 July 1983	Philippa Mdluli	murder	hanging
C	Ethiopia	6 August 2007	Major Tsehaye Woldesellasie	murder	firearm
A	Gabon	11 August 1985	Alexandre Mandja Ngokouta	coup attempt	firing squad
C	Gambia	24 August 2012	Lamin B. Darboe, Alieu Bah, Lamin Jarju, Dawda Bojang, Abubacarr Yarboi, Malang Sonko, Lamin F. Jammeh, Gibril Bah and Tabara Samba	treason and murder	firearm
B	Ghana	12 July 1993	12 men	murder and robbery	firearm
A	Guinea	21 April 2001	3 people	robbery	firearm
A	Guinea-Bissau	18 July 1986	Paulo Correia, Viriato Rodrigues Pā, Benhancaren Na Tchanda, Pedro Ramos, Braima Bangura and N'Bunhe Sanbu	coup attempt	firearm
A	Ivory Coast	none since independence on 7 August 1960			
C	Kenya	9 July 1987	Hezekiah Ochuka and Pancras Oteyo Okumu	treason	hanging
C	Lesotho	1995			hanging
C	Liberia	2000			hanging
D	Libya	23 August 2026	10 unnamed men	terrorism	firearm
A	Madagascar	1958			
C	Malawi	26 September 1992			hanging
C	Mali	21 August 1980	Mamadou Keita and Karuba Coulibaly	murder	firearm
C	Mauritania	1987	3 armed forces officers	treason	firing squad
A	Mauritius	10 October 1987	Eshan Nayeck	murder	hanging
C	Morocco	5 September 1993	Mustapha Tabet	rape	firing squad
A	Mozambique	May 1986			
A	Namibia	May 1988	Sagarias Ariseb	murder	hanging
C	Niger	1976	Bayéré Moussa, Sidi Mohamed, and Ahmed Mouddour	treason	
D	Nigeria	23 December 2016	Ogbomoro Omoregie, Apostle Igene and Mark Omosowhota	murder and armed robbery	hanging
A	Rwanda	24 April 1998	Froduald Karamira and at least 21 others	genocide	firing squad
A	Sahrawi Arab Democratic Republic	1976			
A	São Tomé and Príncipe	none since independence on 12 July 1975			
A	Senegal	15 June 1967	Moustapha Lô	treason (attempted murder of the president)	firing squad
A	Seychelles	none since independence on 29 June 1976			
A	Sierra Leone	19 October 1998	Brigadier Samuel Koroma, Corporal Tamba Gborie, Colonel Abdul Karim Sesay and 21 other unnamed soldiers (20 men, 1 woman)	high treason	public firing squad
D	Somalia	16 February 2026	Hassan Ali Iftin Buule and Hassan Ali Ibrahim Mohamed Ahmed	terrorism	firing squad
D	Somaliland	11 November 2026	Nine unnamed men	murder	firing squad
A	South Africa	14 November 1989	Solomon Ngobeni	murder	hanging
D	South Sudan	29 January 2025	Sabir Abdallah Abusam	rape/murder	hanging
D	Sudan	9 February 2021	Eliza Aban Othu	murder	hanging
C	Tanzania	October 1994	7 unnamed men and 1 unnamed woman		
A	Togo	15 October 1978	Adjata Koffi	murder	
A	Transkei	never used			
C	Tunisia	17 November 1990	Naceur Damergi	murder	hanging
C	Uganda	2005			firing squad
A	Venda (Bantustan)	31 January 1991	John Tsakani Chauke		hanging
A	Zambia	October 1997	Abraham Kasongo, Nelson Ngindano, Dennis Chembe, Robert Mulumbi, David Kapunga, John Gombo, Joe Chilada and Christopher Oldfield	murder	hanging
B	Zimbabwe	22 July 2005	Stephen Chidhumo and Edmund Edgar Masendeke	murder	hanging

== The Americas ==
#	Country	Last execution date	Name	Crime	Method
C	Antigua and Barbuda	2 February 1991	Tyrone Nicholas	murder	hanging
A	Argentina	12 June 1956	Juan José Valle	treason	firing squad
C	Bahamas	6 January 2000	David Mitchell	murder	hanging
C	Barbados	10 October 1984	Noel Jordan, Melvin Inniss and Errol Farrell		hanging
C	Belize	19 June 1985	Kent Bowers	murder	hanging
A	Bermuda	3 December 1977	Erskine Burrows and Larry Tacklyn	murder	hanging
A	Bolivia	30 August 1973	Melquiades Suxo	murder	firearm
B	Brazil	28 April 1876	Francisco	murder	hanging
A	Canada	11 December 1962	Ronald Turpin and Arthur Lucas	capital murder	hanging
B	Chile	29 January 1985	Carlos Topp Collins and Jorge Sagredo	murder	firing squad
A	Colombia	5 May 1907	Manuel Saturio Valencia	arson	firing squad
A	Costa Rica	1859			
C	Cuba	11 April 2003	Lorenzo Enrique Copello Castillo, Bárbaro Leodán Sevilla García and Jorge Luis Martínez Isaac	hijacking	firing squad
C	Dominica	8 August 1986	Frederick Newton	murder resulting from attempted coup	hanging
A	Dominican Republic	1966			
A	Ecuador	1884			
B	El Salvador	8 February 1971	Victoriano Gómez Urrutia	murder	public firing squad
C	Grenada	17 October 1978	Charles Ferguson	murder	hanging
C	Guatemala	20 June 2000	Amílcar Cetino Pérez and Tomás Cerrate Hernández	aggravated murder	lethal injection
C	Guyana	25 August 1997	Michael Archer and Peter Adams	murder	hanging
A	Haiti	1972			
A	Honduras	1940			
C	Jamaica	18 February 1988	Nathan Foster and Stanford Dinnal	murder	hanging
A	Mexico	19 August 1961 (military); 17 June 1957 (civilian)	José Isaías Constante Laureano; Francisco Ruiz Corrales and Juan Zamarripa	murder and insubordination (Constante) child rape and murder (Ruiz and Zamarripa)	firing squad
A	Nicaragua	19 September 1930	Francisco Caballero, Ramón Mayorga Figueroa and Julio Cuadra Montenegro	murder	firing squad
A	Panama	1903			
A	Paraguay	1 December 1917	Gastón Gadín and Cipriano León	murder and parricide	firearm
B	Peru	20 January 1979	Julio Vargas Garayar	espionage	firing squad
C	Saint Kitts and Nevis	19 December 2008	Charles Laplace	murder	hanging
C	Saint Lucia	17 October 1995	Joseph Solomon	murder	hanging
C	Saint Vincent and the Grenadines	13 February 1995	Douglas Hamlet, Franklin Thomas and David Thomas	murder	hanging
A	Suriname	13 March 1982	Wilfred Hawker	treason	firing squad
C	Trinidad and Tobago	28 July 1999	Anthony Briggs	murder	hanging
A	Uruguay	25 September 1902	Manuel Paes and Aurelio González	multiple murders	firearm
A	Venezuela	never used			

=== United States ===
#	Jurisdiction	Last execution date	Name	Crime	Method
D	United States Federal Government	16 January 2021	Dustin John Higgs	aggravated murder	lethal injection
C	United States military	13 April 1961	John Arthur Bennett	child rape and attempted murder	hanging
D	Alabama	5 November 2026	Michael Shannon Taylor	aggravated murder	lethal injection
A	Alaska	Never used	N/A	N/A	N/A
C	American Samoa	24 November 1939	Imoa of Fagatogo	murder	hanging
D	Arizona	20 May 2026	Leroy Dean McGill	aggravated murder	lethal injection
D	Arkansas	27 April 2017	Kenneth Dewayne Williams	aggravated murder	lethal injection
C	California	17 January 2006	Clarence Ray Allen	aggravated murder	lethal injection
A	Colorado	13 October 1997	Gary Lee Davis	aggravated murder	lethal injection
A	Connecticut	13 May 2005	Michael Bruce Ross	aggravated murder	lethal injection
A	Delaware	20 April 2012	Shannon M. Johnson	aggravated murder	lethal injection
D	Florida	19 November 2026	Thomas Mitchell Overton	aggravated murder	lethal injection
D	Georgia	20 March 2024	Willie James Pye	aggravated murder	lethal injection
A	Hawaii	Never used	N/A	N/A	N/A
C	Idaho	12 June 2012	Richard Albert Leavitt	aggravated murder	lethal injection
A	Illinois	17 March 1999	Andrew Kokoraleis	aggravated murder	lethal injection
D	Indiana	5 November 2026	Jeffrey Allen Weisheit	aggravated murder	lethal injection
A	Iowa	6 September 1962	Charles Edwin Kelley	murder	hanging
C	Kansas	22 June 1965	George York and James Latham	murder	hanging
C	Kentucky	21 November 2008	Marco Allen Chapman	aggravated murder	lethal injection
D	Louisiana	18 March 2025	Jessie Dean Hoffman Jr.	aggravated murder	nitrogen hypoxia
A	Maine	21 November 1885	Daniel Wilkinson	murder	hanging
A	Maryland	5 December 2005	Wesley Eugene Baker	aggravated murder	lethal injection
A	Massachusetts	9 May 1947	Philip Bellino and Edward Gertson	murder	electric chair
A	Michigan	Never used	N/A	N/A	N/A
A	Minnesota	13 February 1906	William Williams	murder	hanging
D	Mississippi	15 October 2025	Charles Ray Crawford	aggravated murder	lethal injection
D	Missouri	14 October 2025	Lance Collin Shockley	aggravated murder	lethal injection
C	Montana	11 August 2006	David Thomas Dawson	aggravated murder	lethal injection
D	Nebraska	14 August 2018	Carey Dean Moore	aggravated murder	lethal injection
C	Nevada	26 April 2006	Daryl Linnie Mack	aggravated murder	lethal injection
A	New Hampshire	14 July 1939	Howard Long	murder	hanging
A	New Jersey	22 January 1963	Ralph Hudson	murder	electric chair
A	New Mexico	6 November 2001	Terry Douglas Clark	aggravated murder	lethal injection
A	New York	15 August 1963	Eddie Lee Mays	murder	electric chair
C	North Carolina	18 August 2006	Samuel Russell Flippen	aggravated murder	lethal injection
A	North Dakota	17 October 1905	John Rooney	murder	hanging
C	Ohio	18 July 2018	Robert J. Van Hook	aggravated murder	lethal injection
D	Oklahoma	12 November 2026	James Dwight Pavatt	aggravated murder	lethal injection
C	Oregon	16 May 1997	Harry Charles Moore	aggravated murder	lethal injection
C	Pennsylvania	6 July 1999	Gary Michael Heidnik	aggravated murder	lethal injection
A	Puerto Rico	15 September 1927	Pascual Ramos	murder	hanging
A	Rhode Island	13 February 1845	John Gordon	murder	hanging
D	South Carolina	14 November 2025	Stephen Corey Bryant	aggravated murder	firing squad
D	South Dakota	4 November 2019	Charles Russell Rhines	aggravated murder	lethal injection
D	Tennessee	13 August 2026	Anthony Darrell Dugard Hines	aggravated murder	lethal injection
D	Texas	19 November 2026	Reinaldo Dennes	aggravated murder	lethal injection
D	Utah	8 August 2024	Taberon Dave Honie	aggravated murder	lethal injection
A	Vermont	8 December 1954	Donald DeMag	murder	electric chair
A	Virginia	6 July 2017	William Charles Morva	aggravated murder	lethal injection
A	Washington	10 September 2010	Cal Coburn Brown	aggravated murder	lethal injection
A	Washington, D.C.	26 April 1957	Robert E. Carter	murder	electric chair
A	West Virginia	3 April 1959	Elmer Bruner	aggravated murder	electric chair
A	Wisconsin	21 August 1851	John McCaffary	murder	hanging
C	Wyoming	22 January 1992	Mark Allen Hopkinson	aggravated murder	lethal injection

== Asia ==
#	Country	Last execution date	Name	Crime	Method
D	Afghanistan	2 December 2025	Mangal	mass murder	public firearm
D	Bahrain	27 July 2019	Ali Mohammed al-Arab, Ahmad Issa al-Mulla and 1 unnamed man	terrorism	firing squad
D	Bangladesh	27 July 2023	Mia Mohammad Mohiuddin and Md Jahangir Alam	murder	hanging
A	Bhutan	1964	Chabda Namgyal Bahadur	murder (assassination of the prime minister)	
C	Brunei	none since independence on 1 January 1984			
A	Cambodia	1989			
D	China	21 May 2026	Xu Yao	murder	shooting or lethal injection
A	Timor-Leste	none since independence on 20 May 2002			
A	Hong Kong	16 November 1966	Wong Kai-kei	robbery-murder	hanging
D	India	20 March 2020	Akshay Thakur, Mukesh Singh, Pawan Gupta and Vinay Sharma	gang rape and murder	hanging
C	Indonesia	29 July 2016	Freddy Budiman, Seck Osmane, Michael Titus Igweh and Humphrey Ejike	drug offences	firing squad
D	Iran	23 August 2026	Majid Adineh	espionage	hanging
D	Iraq	February 2026	Saadoun Sabri al-Qaisi	crimes against humanity	hanging
B	Israel	31 May 1962	Adolf Eichmann	crimes against humanity, crimes against the Jewish people	hanging
D	Japan	21 August 2026	Sunao Takami	murder	hanging
D	Jordan	21 June 2026	Mahmoud Nayef Mousa, Anas Anwar Adel Saleh, Ibrahim Mansour Mohammad, Hamzeh Mahmoud Mansour, Khaled Assaf Fayez and Ihab Maher Kamal	murder, terrorism, drug trafficking	hanging
A	Kazakhstan	2003			single firearm
D	Kuwait	20 June 2026	Ali Manahi Mefreh Al-Subaie, Hassan Salem Ayesh Al-Rashidi, Mahmoud Hamdy Ahmed Hassan, Ahmed Mohammed Qate Obeid and Maleh Al-Hamidi Mefiz Al-Harshani	murder, kidnapping, rape, drug possession	hanging
A	Kyrgyzstan	none since independence on 25 December 1991			
C	Laos	1989			
A	Lebanon	17 January 2004	Badih Hamadeh, Remi Antoine Zaatar and Ahmed Mansour	murder	firing squad, hanging
A	Macau	19th century			
D	Malaysia	24 May 2017	Yong Kar Mun and another unnamed man	armed robbery / murder	hanging
C	Maldives	none since independence on 26 July 1965			
A	Mongolia	2008			single firearm
D	Myanmar	23 September 2024	Maung Kaung Htet and Chan Myae Thu	terrorism	hanging
A	Nepal	1979			
D	North Korea	May 2026	Two unnamed men	illegal distribution of video materials	unknown method
D	Oman	22 April 2024	3 unnamed men	murder	firing squad
D	Pakistan	24 November 2019	Brigadier Raja Rizwan	espionage and high treason	hanging
D	Palestine	12 October 2025 (Gaza Strip); July 2005 (Palestinian Authority)	8 unnamed men unnamed man	collaboration with Israel (8 unnamed men) murder (unnamed man)	firearm (8 unnamed men) unknown method (unnamed man)
A	Philippines	4 January 2000	Alex Bartolome	child rape	lethal injection
D	Qatar	21 May 2020	Anil Chaudhary	murder	firing squad
D	Saudi Arabia	16 November 2026	Talal bin Ahmed bin Mohammed Al-Majdouah Al-Maghrabi	rape and robbery	public beheading
D	Singapore	9 September 2026	Sanjay Matthias Krishnan	drug trafficking	hanging
C	South Korea	31 December 1997	23 people including Kim Yong-je, Lee Sang-su and Lee Young-gil	murder, terrorism	hanging
C	Sri Lanka	23 June 1976	Chardradasa Jayasinghe	murder	hanging
D	Syria	2 February 2022	Mohammed	murder	hanging
D	Taiwan	16 January 2025	Huang Lin-kai	rape, murder	firearm
C	Tajikistan	April 2004	Rachabmurod Chumayev, Umed Idiyev, Akbar Radzshabov and Mukharam Fatkhulloyev	mass murder	firing squad
D	Thailand	18 June 2018	Theerasak Longji	robbery-murder	lethal injection
A	Turkmenistan	1997	Maj. Vitaly Usachev	drug trafficking	single firearm
D	United Arab Emirates	28 February 2025	Muhammed Rinash Arangilottu and Muraleedharan Perumthatta Valappil	murder	firing squad
A	Uzbekistan	1 March 2005	Akhrorkhoja Akbarkhojayevich Talipkhojaev		single firearm
D	Vietnam	23 September 2023	Lê Văn Mạnh	murder, child rape and robbery	lethal injection
D	Yemen	12 November 2026	Ahmed al-Zubaidi	premeditated murder	firearm

== Europe ==
#	Country	Last execution date	Name	Crime	Method
C	Abkhazia	never used	N/A	N/A	N/A
A	Albania	25 June 1992	Dritëbardh and Josif Çuko	murder	public hanging
A	Andorra	18 October 1943	Pere Areny	murder	firing squad
A	Armenia	30 August 1991	unnamed man	murder	single firearm
A	Austria	24 March 1950	Johann Trnka	murder	hanging
A	Azerbaijan	February 1993	8 unnamed prisoners		single firearm
D	Belarus	9 October 2024	Aliaksandr Taratuta	murder	single firearm
A	Belgium	9 August 1950	Philipp Schmitt	war crimes	firing squad
A	Bosnia and Herzegovina	1977 (as a republic of Yugoslavia)	Dušan Prodić	murder	firing squad
A	Bulgaria	4 November 1989	Georgi Alinski	sabotage	firing squad
A	Croatia	29 January 1987 (as a republic of Yugoslavia)	Dušan Kosić	murder	firing squad
A	Cyprus	13 June 1962	Hambis Zacharia, Michael Hiletikos and Lazaris Demetriou	murder	hanging
A	Czech Republic	2 February 1989 (as a republic of Czechoslovakia)	Vladimír Lulek	murder	hanging
A	Denmark	20 July 1950	Ib Birkedal Hansen	war crimes	firing squad
A	East Germany	26 June 1981	Werner Teske	treason	single firearm
A	Estonia	11 September 1991	Rein Oruste	murder	single firearm
A	Finland	3 September 1944	three Soviet infiltrators	war crimes	firing squad
A	France	10 September 1977	Hamida Djandoubi	torture murder	beheading by guillotine
A	Georgia	1995		murder	single firearm
A	Germany	9 May 1949; 11 May 1949	Robert Amelung and Peter Steinhauer; Berthold Wehmeyer (West Berlin)	murder	beheading by guillotine
A	Gibraltar	11 January 1944	Luis López Cordón-Cuenca and José Martín Muñoz	treason/sabotage	hanging
A	Greece	25 August 1972	Vassilis Lymberis	murder	firing squad
A	Hungary	14 July 1988	Ernő Vadász	torture murder	hanging
A	Iceland	12 January 1830	Agnes Magnúsdóttir and Friðrik Sigurðsson	murder	public beheading
A	Ireland	20 April 1954	Michael Manning	murder	hanging
A	Italy	5 March 1947	Aurelio Gallo, Emilio Battisti and Achille Morelli	war crimes	firing squad
A	Kosovo	20 November 1987 (as a province of Yugoslavia)	Ahmet Paqarizi	murder	firing squad
A	Latvia	26 January 1996	Rolands Laceklis-Bertmanis	murder	single firearm
A	Liechtenstein	26 February 1785	Barbara Erni	theft	public beheading
A	Lithuania	12 July 1995	Boris Dekanidze	murder	single firearm
A	Luxembourg	24 February 1949		treason	firing squad
A	Malta	5 July 1943	Karmnu Zammit and Guiseppi Zammit	murder	hanging
A	Moldova	none since independence	N/A	N/A	N/A
A	Monaco	1847		murder	beheading by guillotine
A	Montenegro	29 January 1981 (as a republic of Yugoslavia)	Dragiša Ristić	murder	firing squad
A	Netherlands	21 March 1952	Artur Albrecht, Andries Jan Pieters	war crimes	firing squad
C	Northern Cyprus	never used	N/A	N/A	N/A
A	North Macedonia	29 March 1988 (as a republic of Yugoslavia)	Malje Zeqiri	murder and rape	firing squad
A	Norway	28 August 1948	Ragnar Skancke	treason	firing squad
A	Poland	21 April 1988	Andrzej Czabański	murder	hanging
A	Portugal	16 September 1917 (military); 22 April 1846 (civilian)	João Augusto Ferreira de Almeida; José Joaquim	desertion murder	firing squad hanging
A	Romania	25 December 1989	Nicolae Ceauşescu and Elena Ceauşescu	genocide, crimes against the state	firing squad
C	Russia	June 1999 (in Chechnya); 2 August 1996 or 2 September 1996 (mainland Russia, disputed)	Salan Bakharchiyev (in Chechnya); Sergey Golovkin (mainland Russia, 2 August), R.V. Mukhametdinov (mainland Russia, 2 September)	murder (Bakharchiyev) murder, rape, dismemberment, torture (Golovkin), unknown crime (R.V. Mukhametdinov)	single firearm
A	San Marino	1468 or 1667			hanging
A	Serbia	14 February 1992 (as a republic of Yugoslavia)	Johan Drozdek	murder	firing squad
A	Slovakia	8 June 1989 (as a republic of Czechoslovakia)	Štefan Svitek	murder	hanging
A	Slovenia	30 October 1959 (as a republic of Yugoslavia)	Franc Rihtarič	murder	firing squad
C	South Ossetia	never used	N/A	N/A	N/A
A	Spain	27 September 1975	José Humberto Francisco Baena Alonso, Ramón García Sanz, José Luis Sánchez-Bravo Sollas, Juan Paredes Manotas and Angel Otaegui Echevarría	murder	firing squad
A	Sweden	23 November 1910	Johan Alfred Andersson Ander	murder	beheading by guillotine
A	Switzerland	7 December 1944	Hermann Grimm and Walter Laubscher	treason	firing squad
C	Transnistria	never used	N/A	N/A	N/A
A	Turkey	25 October 1984	Hıdır Aslan	murder	hanging
A	Ukraine	11 March 1997	Mykhailo S.	murder	single firearm
A	Vatican City	9 July 1870 (as the Papal States) (never used as Vatican City, established 11 February 1929)	Agabito Bellomo	murder	beheading by guillotine

=== United Kingdom ===
#	Country	Last execution date	Name	Crime	Method
A	England	13 August 1964	Peter Anthony Allen and Gwynne Owen Evans	capital murder	hanging
A	Guernsey	10 February 1854	John Tapner	murder	hanging
A	Isle of Man	1 August 1872	John Kewish	patricide	hanging
A	Jersey	9 October 1959	Francis Joseph Huchet	murder	hanging
A	Northern Ireland	20 December 1961	Robert McGladdery	murder	hanging
A	Scotland	15 August 1963	Henry John Burnett	murder	hanging
A	Wales	6 May 1958	Vivian Teed	murder	hanging

== Oceania ==
#	Country	Last execution date	Name	Crime	Method
A	Cook Islands	none since self-government on 4 August 1965			
A	Federated States of Micronesia	none since independence on 3 November 1986			
A	Fiji	none since independence on 10 October 1970			
A	Kiribati	none since independence on 12 July 1979			
A	Marshall Islands	none since independence on 21 October 1986			
A	Nauru	none since independence on 31 January 1968			
A	New Zealand	17 February 1957	Walter James Bolton	murder	hanging
A	Niue	never used			
A	Palau	none since independence on 1 October 1994			
A	Papua New Guinea	none since independence on 16 September 1975			
A	Western Samoa	none since independence on 1 January 1962			
A	Solomon Islands	none since independence on 7 July 1978			
C	Tonga	7 September 1982	Haloti Sole, Livingi Sole, and Fili Esau	murder	hanging
A	Tuvalu	none since independence on 1 October 1978			
A	Vanuatu	none since independence on 30 July 1980			

=== Australia ===
#	State	Last execution date	Name	Crime	Method
A	Government of Australia	11 June 1951	Takuma Nishimura	war crimes	hanging
A	Australian Capital Territory	never used			
A	New South Wales	24 August 1939	John Trevor Kelly	murder	hanging
A	Northern Territory	7 August 1952	Jaroslav Koci and Jan Novotny	murder	hanging
A	Queensland	22 September 1913	Ernest Austin	murder	hanging
A	South Australia	24 November 1964	Glen Sabre Valance	murder	hanging
A	Tasmania	14 February 1946	Frederick Thompson	murder	hanging
A	Victoria	3 February 1967	Ronald Ryan	murder	hanging
A	Western Australia	26 October 1964	Eric Edgar Cooke	murder	hanging

== See also ==
- Capital punishment by country
