= Gorakhpur (Rawalpindi) =

Village in Punjab

- Town
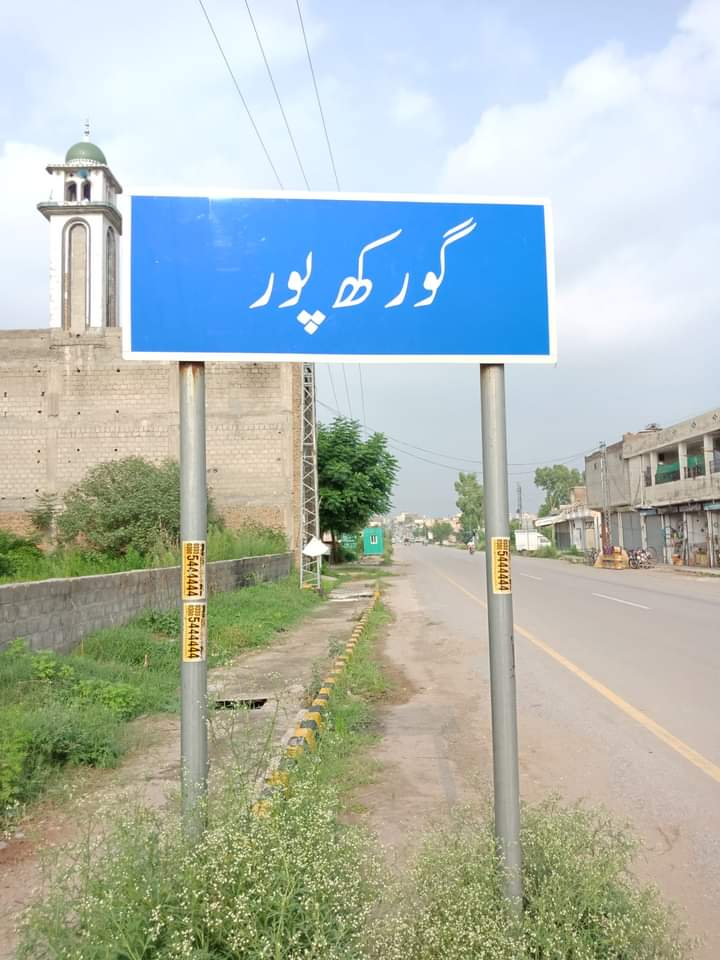

- Location within Pakistan
- Coordinates: 33.47°N 73.03°E
- Country: Pakistan
- Province: Punjab (Pakistan)
- District: Rawalpindi
- Elevation: 416 m (1,365 ft)
- Time zone: UTC+5 (PST)

Gorakhpur or Gorfar is a town of Rawalpindi District in the Punjab province of Pakistan on Adiyala road. It is located at 33.4763° N, 73.0331° E with an altitude of 416 metres (1246 ft), and lies south of the district capital, Rawalpindi near Central Jail Rawalpindi, also known as Adiala Jail.

== Telecommunication ==
The PTCL provides the main network of landline telephone. Many ISPs and all major mobile phone, Wireless companies operating in Pakistan provide service in Gorakhpur.

== Languages ==
Punjabi is the main language of Gorakhpur, other languages are Urdu and Gojri
