= Earl Butts =

Earl Butts may refer to:

- Robert Earl Butts Jr. (1977–2018), one of two perpetrators in the 1996 murder of Donovan Parks
- Earl Butz (1909–2008), United States secretary of agriculture
