= List of people executed in the United States in 2018 =

Twenty-five people, all male, were executed in the United States in 2018; of whom 23 died by lethal injection and two, in Tennessee, by electrocution, marking the first calendar year since 2000 in which more than one inmate was executed in that way. The states of Ohio and Nebraska have not carried out an execution since 2018.

== List of people executed in the United States in 2018 ==
No.	Date of execution	Name	Age of person			Gender	Ethnicity	State	Method	Ref.
No.	Date of execution	Name	At execution	At offense	Age difference	Gender	Ethnicity	State	Method	Ref.
1	January 18, 2018	Anthony Allen Shore	55	24–33	22–31	Male	White	Texas	Lethal injection	
2	January 30, 2018	William Earl Rayford	64	46	18	Male	Black	Texas	Lethal injection	
3	February 1, 2018	John David Battaglia Jr.	62	45	17	Male	White	Texas	Lethal injection	
4	February 22, 2018	Eric Scott Branch	47	21	26	Male	White	Florida	Lethal injection	
5	March 15, 2018	Michael Wayne Eggers	50	33	17	Male	White	Alabama	Lethal injection	
6	March 15, 2018	Carlton Michael Gary	67	26–27	40–41	Male	Black	Georgia	Lethal injection	
7	March 27, 2018	Rosendo Rodriguez III	38	25	13	Male	Hispanic	Texas	Lethal injection	
8	April 19, 2018	Walter Leroy Moody Jr.	83	54	29	Male	White	Alabama	Lethal injection	
9	April 25, 2018	Erick Daniel Davila	31	21	10	Male	Black	Texas	Lethal injection	
10	May 4, 2018	Robert Earl Butts Jr.	40	18	22	Male	Black	Georgia	Lethal injection	
11	May 16, 2018	Juan Edward Castillo	37	22	15	Male	Hispanic	Texas	Lethal injection	
12	June 27, 2018	Danny Paul Bible	66	27–31	35–39	Male	White	Texas	Lethal injection	
13	July 17, 2018	Christopher Anthony Young	34	21	13	Male	Black	Texas	Lethal injection	
14	July 18, 2018	Robert J. Van Hook	58	25	33	Male	White	Ohio	Lethal injection	
15	August 9, 2018	William Ray Irick	59	26	33	Male	White	Tennessee	Lethal injection	
16	August 14, 2018	Carey Dean Moore	60	21	39	Male	White	Nebraska	Lethal injection	
17	September 26, 2018	Troy James Clark	51	30	21	Male	White	Texas	Lethal injection	
18	September 27, 2018	Daniel Clate Acker	46	28	18	Male	White	Texas	Lethal injection	
19	October 29, 2018	Rodney Scott Berget	56	48	8	Male	White	South Dakota	Lethal injection	
20	November 1, 2018	Edmund George Zagorski	63	28	35	Male	White	Tennessee	Electrocution	
21	November 14, 2018	Roberto Moreno Ramos	64	37	27	Male	Hispanic	Texas	Lethal injection	
22	December 4, 2018	Joseph Christopher Garcia	47	29	18	Male	Hispanic	Texas	Lethal injection	
23	December 6, 2018	David Earl Miller	61	23	38	Male	White	Tennessee	Electrocution	
24	December 11, 2018	Alvin Avon Braziel Jr.	43	18	25	Male	Black	Texas	Lethal injection	
25	December 13, 2018	Jose Antonio Jimenez	55	28	27	Male	Hispanic	Florida	Lethal injection	
		Average:	53 years	29 years	24 years					

== Demographics ==
Gender
Male	25	100%
Female	0	0%
Ethnicity
White	14	56%
Black	6	24%
Hispanic	5	20%
State
Texas	13	52%
Tennessee	3	12%
Alabama	2	8%
Florida	2	8%
Georgia	2	8%
Nebraska	1	4%
Ohio	1	4%
South Dakota	1	4%
Method
Lethal injection	23	92%
Electrocution	2	8%
Month
January	2	8%
February	2	8%
March	3	12%
April	2	8%
May	2	8%
June	1	4%
July	2	8%
August	2	8%
September	2	8%
October	1	4%
November	2	8%
December	4	16%
Age
30–39	4	16%
40–49	5	20%
50–59	7	28%
60–69	8	32%
70–79	0	0%
80–89	1	4%
Total	25	100%

== Executions in recent years ==
Number of executions
2019	22
2018	25
2017	23
Total	70

== See also ==
- List of death row inmates in the United States
- List of juveniles executed in the United States since 1976
- List of most recent executions by jurisdiction
- List of women executed in the United States since 1976

Preceded by 2017	List of people executed in the United States in 2018	Succeeded by 2019
