= Dunn v. Ray =

U.S. case related to religious freedom

- Supreme Court of the United States

Decided February 7, 2019
- Full case name: Jefferson S. Dunn, Commissioner, Alabama Department of Corrections, Applicant v. Domineque Hakim Marcelle Ray
- Docket no.: 18A815
- Citations: 586 U.S. ___ (more)

Case history
- Prior: Stay of execution granted, No. 19-10405 (11th Cir. February 6, 2019)

Holding
- The Court vacated the stay of execution because Ray waited until January 28, 2019, to seek relief.

Court membership
- Chief Justice John Roberts Associate Justices Clarence Thomas · Ruth Bader Ginsburg; Stephen Breyer · Samuel Alito; Sonia Sotomayor · Elena Kagan; Neil Gorsuch · Brett Kavanaugh

s
- Dissent: Kagan, joined by Ginsburg, Breyer, Sotomayor

2019 US Supreme Court order

Dunn v. Ray, 586 U.S. ___ (2019), was a February 2019 United States Supreme Court case related to religious freedom. The case attracted media attention in early February 2019.

Defendant Domineque Hakim Marcelle Ray (May 31, 1976 – February 7, 2019) was on Alabama death row for the rape and murder of a 15-year-old girl, and had been given a life sentence for the murders of two brothers. He was scheduled for execution on February 7, 2019, and argued he had the right to have a Muslim imam present in the execution chamber, instead of the Christian chaplain mandated by Alabama's execution protocol. Ray received a stay from the 11th Circuit Court of Appeals the day before his execution, but Alabama moved for the Supreme Court to vacate the stay of execution. The Supreme Court vacated the stay and Ray was executed on his scheduled date. He was one of 22 people executed in the United States in 2019.

The ruling against Ray was criticized by some commentators.

== Background ==
Ray was found guilty of the February 1994 murder of brothers Reinhard and Ernest Mabins, after they refused to join a gang Ray and accomplice Marcus Owden were attempting to organize.

Ray was also found guilty of the July 15, 1995, kidnapping and rape of 15-year-old Tiffany Harville from her home in Selma, Alabama, committed along with Owden. Ray raped and murdered her, and cut her throat with a knife according to Owden's trial testimony. Harville's body was found abandoned in a field in Dallas County a month after she disappeared. Ray participated in the search for Harville after she was reported missing.

Owden testified against Ray and he was convicted in 1999. Owden was sentenced to life in prison, while Ray received a death sentence by an 11–1 to recommendation by jurors, who found the circumstances of the Harville murder particularly heinous.

No physical evidence linked Ray to Hartville's murder. The only evidence that the prosecution had that Ray raped and robbed Hartville came from the severely mentally ill man, Marcus Owden who was suffering from Schizophrenia and had delusions and hallucinations. Owden confessed to the crime and avoided the death penalty by implicating Ray. Owden was also the only person who placed Ray in Selma at the time of the murder. Ray himself also confessed to the crime, stating that Owden was the primary aggressor. He later recanted his confession and argued the crime was committed by another man, who two informants had accused of being the killer.

== Supreme Court decision ==
The U.S. Supreme Court also refused to consider Ray's final appeal.

The motion to vacate, filed by Attorney General Steve Marshall noted Ray, like any condemned prisoner, was "given ample time during the days before his execution to meet with his chosen spiritual advisor" and the spiritual advisor could observe the execution from a viewing area if the prisoner wished. Earlier law and precedent established anyone present in the execution chamber at the time of execution must be an employee of the Alabama Department of Corrections and undergo special training for execution protocols. Ray's "last minute" request for the imam only 10 days before execution, after his nineteen years in prison and familiarity with legal appeals and prison procedures and conversion in Islam in 2006, were likely an attempt to delay his execution for murders.

Marshall's appeal also cited multiple procedural errors in the 11th Circuit ruling.

== Subsequent decisions ==
On March 28, 2019, less than two months after Ray's execution, the Supreme Court stayed the execution of Patrick Murphy of the "Texas Seven" over concerns that not allowing him to have a Buddhist spiritual advisor instead of the Christian chaplain or Muslim imams, only two religions' spiritual advisors permitted by Texas to be present in the execution chamber, would violate his Constitutional rights. The ruling on Murphy renewed attention to Ray's case due to the similarity and proximity of the cases, and the lack of explanation from justices Alito, Kavanaugh and Roberts for their latest positions.

In June 2020, after Texas changed its policy to prohibit the presence of all spiritual advisors in execution chambers, the Supreme Court also stayed the execution of Ruben Gutierrez, a Catholic convicted murderer, and ordered consideration of his request to have a spiritual advisor present in the execution chamber at the time of his execution.

In February 2021, the Supreme Court again ruled that excluding spiritual counselors from the execution chamber was not allowed, by intervening in the execution of Willie B. Smith III, a murderer in Alabama. Writing for the court, Justice Elena Kagan said "Alabama has not carried its burden of showing that the exclusion of all clergy members from the execution chamber is necessary to ensure prison security. So the State cannot now execute Smith without his pastor present, to ease what Smith calls the 'transition between the worlds of the living and the dead'."

Similar issues arose again in September 2021 when the Supreme Court stayed the execution of John Henry Ramirez, who requested to have a minister of his choice present and allowed to lay hands on his body and audibly pray during his execution in Texas. In March 2022, the Supreme Court ruled in favor of Ramirez's request.

== See also ==
- Bucklew v. Precythe
- List of people executed in Alabama
- List of people executed in the United States in 2019

Executions carried out in Alabama
Preceded by Walter Leroy Moody Jr. April 19, 2018	Domineque Hakim Marcelle Ray; February 7, 2019	Succeeded by Michael Brandon Samra – Alabama May 16, 2019
Executions carried out in the United States
Preceded by Robert Mitchell Jennings – Texas January 30, 2019	Domineque Hakim Marcelle Ray – Alabama; February 7, 2019	Succeeded by Billy Wayne Coble – Texas February 28, 2019
