= Danny Bible =

Executed American serial killer (1951–2018)

- Mugshot of Danny Bible
- Born: August 28, 1951; Angleton, Texas, U.S.
- Died: June 27, 2018 (aged 66); Huntsville Unit, Texas, U.S.
- Other name: "The Ice Pick Killer"
- Status: Executed by lethal injection
- Convictions: Texas; Capital murder Murder; Rape; Louisiana; Aggravated rape Montana; Kidnapping
- Penalty: Texas; 25 years imprisonment (Hudgins); Death (Deaton); Louisiana; Life imprisonment Montana; 20 years imprisonment

Details
- Victims: 4
- Span of crimes: 1979–1983
- Country: United States
- State: Texas
- Date apprehended: January 1984 (first arrest); December 16, 1998 (final arrest)

Danny Paul Bible (August 28, 1951 – June 27, 2018), known as The Ice Pick Killer, was an American serial killer, serial rapist and child sexual abuser who committed four murders and numerous rapes between 1979 and 1983. Originally sentenced to 25 years imprisonment for one murder and never charged with two others, he was paroled early and committed multiple sexual assaults across Montana, Texas and Louisiana. Following his final arrest, he confessed to a rape-murder in 1979 and to the two other murders he was never tried for.

After failing to appeal his death sentence, Bible was executed in 2018.

== Murders ==
=== Inez Deaton ===
In May 1979, Bible was watching television at his home in Houston, Texas, when he was visited by 20-year-old Inez Deaton, a neighbor and friend of his cousin who wanted to use the telephone. Upon entering the house, Bible grabbed her and demanded that she have sex with him, which Deaton refused to do. In response, he forcibly tore off her clothes and started raping her, but as she resisted, he started strangling and eventually resorted to stabbing her with an ice pick. After stabbing her 11 times in the head and chest, Bible put the body in his car and then drove to a nearby bayou, where he abandoned her.

Deaton's body was found on May 27 by a passer-by. She had no pants and her underwear had been partially torn, and her legs had been spread open by her killer. Shortly after Deaton's funeral, Bible fled Texas and moved between Montana and Wyoming, where he married a woman. The union proved to be abusive, as Bible often physically and sexually abused her.

=== Weatherford murders ===
On May 16, 1983, Bible broke into the apartment of 21-year-old Pamela Kay Hudgins, a relative of his wife who lived in Weatherford, Texas. Unaware that she was being visited by her friend, 20-year-old Tracy Zan Powers, who also brought her 4-month-old son Justin, Bible proceeded to bludgeon all three of them to death. He then put the bodies in the trunk of his car and drove to the nearby town of Mineral Wells, where he discarded the bodies in different locations.

Almost immediately after the killings, Bible fled Texas yet again, abandoning his wife's car at an airport in Midland. His exact movements for the next couple of months are unknown. On December 2, he was in Belgrade, Montana, when he decided to go to the home of Leanne Miller, an ex-girlfriend. Once he knocked on the door, he was let in by the woman's babysitter, as she recognized him as her employer's ex-boyfriend - he then proceeded to tie up both women and rape Miller's 11-year-old daughter before stealing some valuables from the house.

=== Arrest, charges and imprisonment ===
In November 1983, Bible was charged with the murder of Hudgins, as this was the only one of the three cases where authorities judged that they had enough evidence to put him to trial. Facing charges both in Texas and Montana, Bible instead traveled to Spokane, Washington and from there to Florida.

In late January 1984, he was arrested in Fort Myers, Florida, after a routine check, and not long after that, he waived the extradition proceedings. It was decided that he would be tried in Texas first, and he was promptly transferred to that state a few days later.

In August, Bible pleaded guilty to Hudgins' murder and was sentenced to 25 years imprisonment. The authorities lacked evidence to charge him with the killings of Tracy and Justin Powers, and the inability to establish a cause of death for either of them ultimately led to him not being charged at all. At the same time, he was convicted and sentenced to 20 years imprisonment for the Montana case, but was allowed to serve his sentence in Texas.

=== Death of Bible's son ===
Following his conviction, Bible was imprisoned at a prison in Rosharon to serve out his sentence. In January 1992, a personal tragedy would come about after one of the seven children he had with his first wife, 15-year-old Timothy Martin Bible, was shot and killed during an altercation with a police officer in Wahneta, Florida.

News reports state that on January 30, 21-year-old police deputy Paul Kurtzweil went to the mobile home of Celsa Bible, where she lived with her seven children, to arrest Timothy on outstanding charges of forgery and failing to appear in court. When he arrived there, he was informed by one of the older brothers, John, that Timothy was playing at the bridge of the nearby Wahneta Farms Drainage Canal. Kurtzweil drove to the designated location and attempted to apprehend the teenaged boy, who instead started running away.

In the ensuing chase, Timothy drew a .25-caliber handgun, prompting Dep. Kurtzweil to shoot him in the head. The entire ordeal was seen by an unnamed witness who later testified on the deputy's behalf, claiming that he saw the teenaged Bible pulling the handgun out. The shooting was ruled to be in self-defense, and Kurtzweil faced no charges for the incident.

== Parole, relapse and confessions ==
In 1993, Bible was released on mandatory supervision after serving nine years of his original sentence. He moved in to live with some of his family members in Montana, and over the next five years, he would periodically sexually abuse five of his nieces of various ages.

This would continue until November 8, 1998. On that date, he was visiting Port Allen, Louisiana, and decided to break into a randomly-chosen hotel room. The room he chose was occupied by a woman named Tera Robinson, who he proceeded to physically and sexually assault before attempting to stuff her into a duffel bag. Before he could do anything further to her, Robinson scared off Bible by warning him that her boyfriend would come soon, causing him to flee.

A warrant was issued for Bible's arrest shortly afterwards, and on December 16, he was arrested by the federal authorities in Fort Myers, Florida, and extradited back to Louisiana. While awaiting trial for the rape charges there, he spontaneously confessed to the murders he had committed in Texas and at least nine rapes. Two weeks later, detectives from Texas were dispatched to interrogate him from his jail cell in Louisiana.

== Trial and imprisonment ==
Finding his confession to be sufficient for a murder charge, Bible was charged with Deaton's murder and extradited back to Texas to face trial. In June 2003, a jury found him guilty of capital murder after just three hours of deliberation. He was sentenced to death.

Less than a month after his conviction, on July 18, Bible was involved in a car accident that almost killed him. On that date, he was being driven to the state's death row at the Polunsky Unit, when a pickup truck driving along the U.S. Route 190 accidentally swerved off the road and hit the prison van in a head-on collision. The crash caused two fatalities - 40-year-old prison guard John Bennett and 65-year-old Ruth Anglin, the driver of the pickup truck - and injured three others: Bible; the second prison guard, 45-year-old Steven Gardner, and another motorist, Sheena Bates, who crashed into the back of one of the vehicles. Gardner and Bates suffered minor injuries, while Bible broke one of his vertebrae and required a surgery. While he survived the ordeal, he was left physically impaired and would experience frequent severe headaches and blackouts.

Over the following decade, Bible and his lawyers submitted multiple appeals to have his death sentence commuted, with his final one being rejected by the Supreme Court in 2016.

== Execution ==
At a press conference held on March 12, 2018, District Attorney Kim Ogg announced that she would sign a death warrant for Bible, as she considered him to be an example of the "worst of the worst" cases that deserved the death penalty. This motion was the subject of objection by Bible's attorneys, who argued that their client should be executed either via firing squad or nitrogen hypoxia due to his health issues. In response, Assistant Texas Attorney General Stephen Hoffman said that this was simply an attempt to delay the execution and that Bible's medical treatment showed that there would be no issue to find a vein suitable for IV insertion.

On June 27, 2018, Bible was executed at the Huntsville Unit via lethal injection. While he had no final words, reporters from The Houston Chronicle claimed that he had uttered the words "It hurts" and "Burning" after being injected, but this has never been officially verified.

== See also ==
- List of people executed by lethal injection
- List of people executed in Texas, 2010–2019
- List of people executed in the United States in 2018
- List of serial killers in the United States
- List of serial rapists

Executions carried out in Texas
Preceded by Juan Edward Castillo May 16, 2018	Daniel Paul Bible; June 27, 2018	Succeeded by Christopher Anthony Young July 17, 2018
Executions carried out in the United States
Preceded by Juan Edward Castillo – Texas May 16, 2018	Daniel Paul Bible – Texas; June 27, 2018	Succeeded by Christopher Anthony Young – Texas July 17, 2018
