= Carlton Gary =

American serial killer (1950–2018)

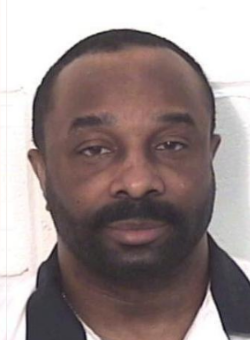
- Born: September 24, 1950; Columbus, Georgia, U.S.
- Died: March 15, 2018 (aged 67); Georgia Diagnostic and Classification Prison, Georgia, U.S.
- Other names: Carl Michaels; Michael David; The Stocking Strangler
- Status: Executed by lethal injection
- Convictions: Armed robbery (February 22 & March 29, 1979); Escape (August 10, 1979); Rape, murder & property damage (August 26, 1986)
- Penalty: 21 years term imprisonment (1979); Death (August 27, 1986)
- Escaped: March 15, 1983

Details
- Victims: 4–8+
- Span of crimes: July 1970 – April 19, 1978
- Country: United States
- States: New York, Georgia
- Date apprehended: December 1978; May 3, 1984

Carlton Michael Gary (September 24, 1950 – March 15, 2018) was an American serial killer who murdered three elderly women in Columbus, Georgia, and one in Syracuse, New York, between 1975 and 1978, though he is suspected of at least four more killings. Gary was arrested in December 1978 for an armed robbery and sentenced to 21 years in prison. He escaped from custody in 1983 and was caught a year later. Evidence was found linking him to the earlier murders and he was convicted and sentenced to death in August 1986. He was executed by lethal injection on March 15, 2018.

== Background ==
Carlton Gary was born on September 24, 1950, in Columbus, Georgia. His father was a construction worker who wanted nothing to do with him and would not accept any financial responsibility for him. Gary met his biological father only once, when he was 12 years old. Gary's mother was extremely poor and, as a result, they frequently relocated. He was malnourished most of the time and was often left with his aunt or great-aunt, both maids for elderly, wealthy women.

In elementary school, Gary suffered serious head trauma when he was knocked unconscious in a playground accident. In his teens, he was a heavy drug user. Between the ages of 14 and 18, he was arrested numerous times for robbery, arson and assault.

During that time, he married a woman named Sheila, and had two children. In 1970, he moved to Albany, New York, where he had plans to become a singer, but he continued with his criminal activities.

== Murders ==
On February 12, 1970, Marion Brewer, 62, was found strangled in her room at the Hampton Hotel in Albany. She was discovered face up on her bed, had been raped, and had visible marks on her throat. Her pocketbook was found open near her head with no money inside. Two months later, on April 14, 1970, Nellie M. Farmer, 85, was found dead in her room at the Wellington Hotel, also in Albany. Her partially clothed body was on the floor, next to the bed, with a long piece of fabric near her neck. She had been raped and her death was listed as "asphyxiation due to manual strangulation."

After Gary attempted an assault on a third elderly woman, he was arrested and his fingerprints matched one left at the scene of the Farmer murder. Gary admitted having taken part in a robbery, but he claimed that an accomplice, John Lee Mitchell, was responsible for the actual murder.

Gary testified against Mitchell in court, and Mitchell was charged, despite no material evidence connecting him to the crime. Gary was charged only with robbery, a sentence he served in the Onondaga County Correctional Institution in Jamesville, New York.

He was paroled in 1975 and moved to Syracuse, New York. Here, he attacked, raped and strangled two more elderly women in their homes; one died and the other survived. The attacks occurred within four days of each other. The two survivors were not able to identify Gary positively, as the crimes occurred in the dark; at least one victim was sure that her attacker was a mustachioed black male, and she was strangled with a scarf.

Gary was never charged for any of these crimes, but was instead sent back to prison for parole violation and robbery after he was caught trying to sell coins stolen from the same apartment building as one of the surviving Syracuse victims. On August 22, 1977, Gary escaped from his low-security prison by sawing through the bars of his cell and made it back to Columbus, Georgia.

One month after his escape, on September 16, 1977, he raped, beat and strangled 60-year-old Ferne Jackson to death with a nylon stocking at her home in the Wynnton district of Columbus. Nine days later, he killed 71-year-old Jean Dimenstein in a similar fashion, followed by 89 year-old Florence Scheible on October 21 and 69 year-old Martha Thurmond on October 25. On December 28, Gary struck again, raping and killing 74-year-old Kathleen Woodruff. This time, there was no stocking left at the scene.

Two months later on February 12, 1978, Gary attacked Ruth Schwob, but fled after she triggered a bedside alarm. He went just two blocks down the road before breaking into another house and raping and strangling 78-year-old Mildred Borom. His final victim was 61-year-old Janet Cofer, whom he murdered on April 20, 1978.

Police announced that they suspected an African-American man of the murders. Things became more complicated when a man calling himself the "Chairman of the Forces of Evil" threatened to murder selected black women if the Stocking Strangler was not stopped. This turned out to be an African-American male named William Henry Hance, who was trying to cover up three murders of his own by putting the blame onto white vigilantes. Hance was arrested on April 4; police hoped that he was the Stocking Strangler, but their hopes were dashed when Cofer was murdered.

In December 1978, following a robbery in Gaffney, South Carolina, Gary was arrested, and he confessed and was sentenced to 21 years in prison for armed robbery. He escaped from custody on March 15, 1983, coincidentally 35 years to the day before his execution, and remained at large for a year before he was apprehended again. New evidence had come to light, including a gun that was traced back to Gary and a possible fingerprint match that led the police to believe that Gary was the serial killer they were looking for.

Overall, Gary is alleged to have raped nine and murdered seven elderly women between 1977 and 1978 in Columbus. Known there as the Stocking Strangler, in three of the cases he was convicted of beating, sexually assaulting and strangling the victims, mostly by using stockings. Two of the survivors testified that he strangled them into unconsciousness before raping or attempting to rape them. The one Georgia survivor positively identified him as her attacker in court. However, she had previously positively identified three other black men as the attacker and, in her initial statement, had indicated that it was too dark to even distinguish the race of the attacker. His fingerprints were found at four of the crime scenes. Gary was indicted for the murders on May 5, 1984, convicted on August 26, 1986, for three of the murders, and sentenced to death the following day.

== Controversy ==
Questions have been raised over the propriety of Gary's conviction. According to a group of supporters and a book by investigative journalist David Rose, Gary's lawyer was refused state funding to carry out a defense. There is also evidence that Gary's fingerprints were not held to match the crime scene prints until seven years after, when the case was re-examined, despite Gary having been printed just one year after the murder, at a time when all prints in the U.S. were being compared to prints found at the crime sites. They also claim Gary's interview at which he supposedly confessed was not recorded, nor were notes taken, and Gary's confession was written by a police officer in the days following the interview, from his own recollection. When submitted as evidence, the confession was unsigned and undated, and Gary denied having made it. They allege Gary's semen antigen secretion did not match the perpetrator's. DNA testing on evidence from some of the crime scenes linked Gary to the murder of Jean Dimenstein, but not the murder of Martha Thurmond or the rape of Gertrude Miller. Further evidence could not be tested for DNA because the police had contaminated the samples. Furthermore, a cast made from a bite wound on a victim allegedly did not match Gary's bite-mark pattern although it was noted that he had had dental work in prison subsequent to the victims' deaths. His supporters claimed that the prosecution withheld this evidence at trial. A key witness for the prosecution — Gertrude Miller, a woman who testified that Gary had raped her — had initially told prosecutors that she had been asleep and her bedroom had been dark at the time of the assault and she could not describe nor identify her attacker. This was not divulged to the defence. Miller also later identified a different man, Jerome Livas, as the man who had raped her. Prosecutors withheld shoe print evidence from the defence from the scene until 20 years after his trial. This evidence was that a size 10 print found at one of the crime scenes could not have been left by Gary, because he wore size 13½ shoes. The prosecution also withheld scientific evidence that killer was a 'non-secretor' i.e. someone who did not secrete his blood group marker in bodily fluids like semen. Gary did secrete his blood group in his bodily fluids and therefore could not have been the killer.

Rose's book also links prosecutors, judges and police who worked on the case to a whites-only organization called The Big Eddy Club and traces the history of racial injustice in Columbus, including the role of the judge's family members in lynchings and other injustices in the city.

In 2007, Gary was positively linked through DNA to the rape and murder of 40-year-old Marion Fisher. Marion was raped and murdered after leaving a bar in Nedrow, New York, in 1975. The prosecutor for Onondaga County, New York declined to charge Gary since he was already on death row and extraditing him would present an escape risk.

== Execution ==
On December 1, 2009, the U.S. Supreme Court refused to hear Gary's latest appeal, clearing the way for an execution date to be set. On December 4, a court set a December 16 execution date for Gary. On December 15, the state Board of Pardons and Paroles denied a request to stay his execution. On December 16, only hours before the execution, the Georgia Supreme Court halted the execution to hold a hearing and determine whether DNA tests should be conducted to determine Gary's guilt or innocence. On February 23, 2018, a new execution date was set for March 15, 2018.

On March 15, 2018, Carlton Gary was executed by lethal injection. He declined to make a final statement and died at 10:33 p.m.

== See also ==
- List of people executed in Georgia (U.S. state)
- List of people executed in the United States in 2018
- List of serial killers in the United States

Executions carried out in Georgia
Preceded by John "J.W." Ledford Jr. May 17, 2017	Carlton Michael Gary; March 15, 2018	Succeeded by Robert Earl Butts Jr. May 4, 2018
Executions carried out in the United States
Preceded by Michael Wayne Eggers – Alabama March 15, 2018	Carlton Michael Gary – Georgia; March 15, 2018	Succeeded by Rosendo Rodriguez III – Texas March 27, 2018
