= Saifur Rehman (Pakistani politician, born 1954) =

Pakistani businessman (born 1954)

Saifur Rehman Khan Senator

Ehtesab Bureau
- In office 1997–1999

Personal details
- Born: 7 December 1954 (age 71) Lahore, Punjab, Pakistan
- Party: Pakistan Muslim League (Nawaz)

Saifur Rehman Khan (Urdu: سیف الرحمان خان; born 7 December 1954) is a Pakistani businessman and former politician currently based in Qatar. He served as the chairman of the Ehtesab Bureau during Second Sharif ministry. He also served as a member of the Senate of Pakistan as a candidate of the Pakistan Muslim League (Nawaz) (PML-N).

A multi-millionaire businessman, he is currently living in Qatar with his family. His daughter Ayesha married Nawaz Sharif's grandson Junaid Safdar in 2021; the couple divorced in 2023.

== Early life and education ==
He was born on 7 December 1954 in Lahore. He obtained a degree in commerce from the Punjab University in 1974.

== Business career ==
He is the Chairman of the Redco Group of Industries. Operating in Qatar since 1981, as of 2023 Redco had a workforce of 20,000 employees and engineers, and was considered the country's largest industrial and contracting group operating.

== Political career ==
He had been member of the Senate of Pakistan as a candidate of Pakistan Muslim League (Nawaz) (PML-N).

He was member of the Senate of Pakistan from 1997 to 2000 during the 2nd tenure of Pakistani statesman and politician Mian Nawaz Sharif.

== Controversies ==
=== Redco corruption case (1999) ===
Saifur and his brother Mujibur were imprisoned at Central Jail Rawalpindi (also known as Adiala Jail) starting from 1999 in a Redco Textile Mills corruption case. They were granted bail by the Supreme Court on 22 November 2001.

=== NAB case (2012) ===
In 2012, the Federal Investigation Agency (FIA) issued his red warrants and contacted Qatari government with help of Interpol to extradite Rehman to Pakistan. This warrant was subsequently quashed by Interpol. He is facing charges of doing covert operations with help of FIA as the chairman of the National Accountability Bureau against his political opponents, committing acts of torture and keeping them under illegal detention.

=== Redco corruption case (2018) ===
In 2018, Customs Intelligence recovered 21 luxury vehicles from Redco Textile Mills, mill owned by the Saifur Rehman and Qatari ruling family members. However, alleged claims of these incidents were later dismissed as unsubstantiated and were altered to a straw man fallacical extent.
