= Mirza Tahir Hussain =

Mirza Tahir Hussain (Urdu: مرزا طاہر حسین; born 1 June 1970) is a British man who spent 18 years on death row in Pakistan for the murder of a taxicab driver named Jamshed Khan in 1988. Following his conviction, Mirza was held in the Central Jail in Rawalpindi. He was paroled on 17 November 2006.

== Conviction ==
Hussain asserted that he killed Khan in self-defence, as Khan pulled out a gun and tried to sexually assault him. In the ensuing struggle, the gun went off, fatally injuring Khan. His conviction was quashed by the Pakistani Supreme Court, but he was then found guilty by The Federal Sharia Court. He was due to be hanged on 1 June 2006. The execution was delayed multiple times from the initial June 2006 date. The first delay, from June to August, may have resulted from an effort to avoid an execution during a visit to Pakistan by Prince Charles. A second delay moved the scheduled date back to 1 September 2006. This would reportedly give Mr. Hussain's family time to negotiate blood money with the relatives of the victim, a practice under Islamic law. The next delay, to 1 October 2006 at 0500 BST, may have been related to the observation of the holy month of Ramadan.

Mirza's brother, Amjad Hussain, was outspoken in his defense, referring to the execution delays as "psychological torture... it's die another day." "There are serious doubts about the safety of Mirza Tahir Hussain's conviction and he still faces execution in a matter of weeks," said Tim Hancock of Amnesty International. Catherine Wolthuizen of Fair Trials Abroad commented that the death sentence was based on "fabricated evidence and double jeopardy" and that execution "would be an appalling travesty of justice." The victim's mother, Zarvari Bibi, characterized the death sentence as the will of God and had threatened to set herself on fire if he did not hang.

== Commutation and parole ==
In spite of a clemency plea from Prince Charles, Mirza was given only a two-month stay of execution with a new execution date set for 31 December 2006. The President of Pakistan, Pervez Musharraf, initially hesitated to take any action, claiming that he was not a dictator and that he could not violate a court judgement. However, Musharraf ultimately intervened, resulting in commutation of the sentence to life imprisonment.

Under Pakistani law, those given life sentences are eligible for parole after 25 years. Since Mirza had served 18 years, and maintained good behavior, he was paroled early on November 17. He has since returned to the United Kingdom.

== See also ==
- Capital punishment in Pakistan
- Human Rights Commission of Pakistan
- Human rights in Pakistan
- Sharia
