= William Henry Hance =

American serial killer (1951–1994)

- Born: November 10, 1951; Lexington, Virginia, U.S.
- Died: March 31, 1994 (aged 42); Georgia Diagnostic and Classification State Prison, Georgia, U.S.
- Other name: The Forces of Evil
- Status: Executed by electric chair
- Convictions: Murder (3 counts total; 2 in Military court, 1 in Georgia state court)
- Penalty: Death (December 1978 (Georgia) & August 1986 (Military)

Details
- Victims: 3+ murdered
- Span of crimes: 1977–1978
- Country: United States
- States: Georgia and Indiana
- Date apprehended: April 4, 1978

William Henry Hance (November 10, 1951 – March 31, 1994) was an American serial killer and U.S. Army soldier who murdered three women near Fort Benning in Columbus, Georgia, between 1977 and 1978. He was known to have sent taunting letters to police and the media attempting to blame the crimes on a group of white men known as the Forces of Evil.

Hance was convicted of murdering three women in Georgia and sentenced to death. A fourth murder, which occurred in Indiana, he was never tried for, but was deemed the prime suspect. He spent fifteen years on death row in Georgia before his execution in the electric chair in 1994.

== Early life ==
Hance was born on November 10, 1951, in Lexington, Virginia, the first of two children born to David and Mary Hance. His father worked as a custodian while his mother used a wheelchair during his adolescence, and died in 1970.

Hance was a quiet yet social child who hung around smart children, even though he was purported to have an IQ of around 75 –79 points. Raised in Rockbridge County, he graduated from Lexington High School in 1971 and initially enlisted in the U.S. Marines. His only run-in with law enforcement during his early life was a parking ticket issued in 1970. After rising to the rank of Sergeant, he transferred to the U.S. Army and completed basic training in Oklahoma, before being stationed at Fort Benning in 1976.

== Investigation ==
In 1978, Columbus, Georgia was undergoing a wave of murders of women. Several elderly white women had been killed by a perpetrator nicknamed the Stocking Strangler. In addition, the bodies of two young Black sex workers had been found outside of nearby Fort Benning.

The disparate groups of victims were linked by a letter to the local police chief written on United States Army stationery. The handwritten note purported to be from a gang of seven white men who were holding a black woman hostage and would kill her if the Stocking Strangler were not apprehended. The Stocking Strangler was believed to be a black man, and this had been widely reported at the time.

The seven white vigilantes wished to be known as the "Forces of Evil", and wanted the police chief to communicate with them via messages on radio or television. The first letter was followed by others; eventually, a ransom demand of $10,000 was also made to keep the alleged hostage, Gail Jackson, alive. Jackson was also known as Brenda Gail Faison and other aliases. The letters were followed by phone calls.

The letters and calls were a hoax intended to divert attention from the real killer. Gail Jackson, the supposed hostage, had been murdered five weeks before she was found, and before the first letter was sent. Her body was discovered in early April 1978. She was 21 years old. Soon afterward, following instructions in yet another call from the "Forces of Evil", a second black woman's body was found at a rifle range at Fort Benning. Her name was Irene Thirkield. She was 32.

FBI profiler Robert K. Ressler created a profile which asserted that the killer was one man, not seven; black, not white; single, not well-educated, and probably a low-ranking military man at the fort in his late twenties.

Using the profile and aware that both Jackson and Thirkield were prostitutes, Georgia Bureau of Investigation officers searched near the fort for bars which had generally black patrons. They were quickly able to identify William Hance and arrest him. He was a Specialist (E-4) attached to an artillery unit at the fort as a truck driver. Hance had begun his military career as a Marine before joining the Army.

When confronted with evidence including his handwriting, voice recordings, and shoe prints from the crime scenes, Hance confessed to killing both women and to the killing of a third woman at Fort Benning in September 1977. Karen Hickman, 24, was a white Army private known to date black soldiers and socialize in black pubs. Hance was not charged with Hickman's murder in the civilian system, but was charged, tried, and convicted by a court martial for her death.

Eventually, Hance was also identified as the killer of a young black woman at Fort Benjamin Harrison in Indiana. Hance was not charged with this murder.

However, despite his four known homicides, he was innocent of the Stocking Strangler murders, eventually attributed to another black man, Carlton Gary.

=== Military courts ===
- Hance was convicted in a military court, but not tried in civilian courts, for the murder of Irene Thirkield.
- Hance was also tried and convicted in a court martial, but not a civilian court, for the murder of Karen Hickman.
- During his court martial for the murder of Irene Thirkield, Hance received a life sentence which was reversed when jurors decided he lacked the mental capacity for premeditation.
- For the deaths of both Hickman and Thirkield, Hance's final court martial sentence was life at hard labor. The convictions were set aside in 1980 and he was not retried by the military court system.

=== Civilian courts ===
- Hance v. State, 245 Ga. 856, 268 S.E.2d 339, cert. denied, 449 U.S. 1067, 101 S.Ct. 796, 66 L.Ed.2d 611 (1980). In this case, Hance's conviction and sentence of death in the Jackson murder were affirmed by the Georgia Supreme Court. The Thirkield murder is also included in the Court's summation of the facts.
- Hance v. Zant, 456 U.S. 965, 102 S.Ct. 2046, 72 L.Ed.2d 491 (1982). The United States Supreme Court denied certiorari in Hance's habeas corpus appeal in the Jackson murder.
- William Henry Hance, Petitioner, v. Walter D. Zant, Warden, Georgia Diagnostic And Classification Center, Respondent United States Court of Appeals, Eleventh Circuit. 696 F.2d 940, cert. denied, 463 U.S. 1210, 103 S.Ct. 3544, 77 L.Ed.2d 1393 (1983). After the U.S. Supreme Court declined to hear his first habeas petition in the Jackson case in 1982, the federal appellate court for the 11th Circuit, which includes Georgia, affirmed Hance's conviction but ordered a retrial of the sentencing stage because the prosecutor's closing argument rendered the sentencing proceeding fundamentally unfair, and because two jurors were improperly excluded in violation of Witherspoon v. Illinois, a case about unjust challenges to jury members regarding their death penalty beliefs. The federal appellate court therefore ordered the state court system to provide a new, more fair, sentencing phase trial for the murder of Jackson.
- Hance v. State, 254 Ga. 575, 332 S.E.2d 287, cert. denied, 474 U.S. 1038, 106 S.Ct. 606, 88 L.Ed.2d 584 (1985). After a second sentencing trial resulted in another death sentence for the murder of Jackson, the Georgia Supreme Court affirmed the death sentence.
- Hance filed another petition for habeas corpus in the Superior Court of Butts County, which is a Georgia state trial court. That court denied his petition after holding an evidentiary hearing.
- Hance v. Kemp, 258 Ga. 649, 373 S.E.2d 184 (1988), cert. denied, 490 U.S. 1012, 109 S.Ct. 1658, 104 L.Ed.2d 172 (1989) The Georgia Supreme Court affirmed the denial of habeas corpus by the Superior Court of Butts County, and in 1989, the U.S. Supreme Court refused to hear his appeal of the 1988 Georgia Supreme Court ruling.
- After the Georgia Supreme Court affirmed the denial of habeas corpus by the Superior Court of Butts County in 1988, Hance then filed a new petition for habeas corpus in the federal District Court for the Middle District of Georgia; that court denied the petition without holding an evidentiary hearing. Hance then appealed to the federal appellate court for the 11th Circuit, which decided the case in January 1993.
- William Henry Hance, Petitioner-appellant, v. Walter Zant, Warden, Georgia Diagnostic & Classification Center, Respondent-appellee United States Court of Appeals, Eleventh Circuit. 981 F.2d 1180 (January 6, 1993). Rehearing and Rehearing En Banc Denied March 11, 1993. In a relatively brief order, a panel of the federal appellate court in the 11th Circuit denied Hance's habeas appeal in the Jackson murder, and denied him the opportunity to present his case to the full appellate bench (instead of the panel).

== Execution ==
Hance was condemned to death in civilian court for the murder of Gail Jackson and sentenced to life imprisonment in military court for the murder of Irene Thirkield in December 1978. In August 1986, his military life sentence for the murder of Thirkield was overturned, but not his civilian death sentence for the murder of Jackson. He was executed by the state of Georgia on March 31, 1994, via the electric chair. He was the 231st inmate executed nationwide since the U.S. Supreme Court restored the death penalty in 1976 and the 18th in Georgia.

In the hours before his death, the Supreme Court voted, 6–3, not to consider his appeal. In dissent, Justice Harry Blackmun said that even if he had not recently

reached the conclusion that the death penalty cannot be imposed fairly within the constraints of our Constitution . . . I could not support its imposition in this case. ... There is substantial evidence that William Henry Hance is mentally retarded as well as mentally ill. There is reason to believe that his trial and sentencing proceedings were infected with racial prejudice. One of his sentencers has come forward to say that she did not vote for the death penalty because of his mental impairments.

Hance had an IQ of 75 –79 points, which classifies him as "borderline intellectual functioning" on modern medical scales of mental retardation.

== Controversy ==
Other issues besides Hance's mental and psychiatric status had created controversy prior to the day of his electrocution, and one—the question of racial bias in the state sentencing jury—veritably exploded afterwards. The Georgia State Board of Pardons and Paroles had not even proofread its order denying his stay of execution, and conflated it with another document about some other prisoner. The Georgia Supreme Court denied his appeal by only one vote, 4–3.

One of his jurors at his second sentencing (after the first was reversed for prosecutorial misconduct), a white woman named Patricia Lemay, came forward to report that other jurors made racial remarks about Hance such as "just one more sorry nigger that no one would miss" and, if executed, he would be "one less nigger to breed."

There was only one black juror, a 26-year-old woman named Gayle Lewis Daniels. According to Lemay, Daniels was subjected to racial invective in the jury room. According to both Lemay and Daniels herself, Daniels refused to vote for the death penalty. The other jurors ignored her and reported to the judge that they were unanimous. When the jury was polled in the presence of the court, Daniels was by then too frightened to speak up. The other jurors had told her that she could be convicted of perjury if she continued to hold out, since she had testified, during jury selection, that she could vote for the death penalty.

At a law school conference the following year, attorney Ronald J. Tabak stated at some length his opinion that Hance's race contributed to the sentence.

== In popular culture ==
Hance was portrayed by Corey Allen in the second season of the Netflix series, Mindhunter.

== See also ==
- List of people executed in Georgia (U.S. state)
- List of people executed in the United States in 1994
- List of serial killers in the United States
- List of people executed by electrocution
