= Capital punishment in Hungary =

Europe holds the greatest concentration of abolitionist states (blue). Map current as of 2022 Abolished for all offences Abolished in practice Retains capital punishment

Capital punishment was completely abolished in Hungary on 24 October 1990 by the Constitutional Court (Decision 23/1990). A month later on 1 December 1990, Protocol 6 to the ECHR came into force. Hungary later adopted the Second Optional Protocol to the ICCPR as well. The last condemned man to be executed, Ernő Vadász, was hanged for the crime of murder on 14 July 1988. In April 2015, following the murder of a woman in southern Hungary, Prime Minister Viktor Orbán suggested that Hungary must reinstate capital punishment. This statement caused a strong reaction from EU officials, and Orbán had to retract as a result. The European Union holds a strong opposition against the death penalty in its relation to the Action Plan on Human Rights and Democracy.

== Suggestion of reintroducing the death penalty ==
In that parliamentary debate on capital punishment Orbán stated that the EU attacked the implementation of real life prison sentences arguing against having habitual offenders being let back into society. The Civil Liberties Committee held a debate on Thursday, 7 May on how to take action with the suggestion of reintroducing the notion of capital punishment. The debate is discussed with Viktor Orbán on reintroducing the death penalty and it showed Orbán's views on abolishing capital punishment, he was upset with the verdict of allowing habitual offenders back into society. In April 2015, following the murder of a woman in southern Hungary, Prime Minister Orbán suggested that Hungary must reinstate capital punishment. This statement caused a strong reaction by EU officials, and Orbán had to retract it as a result.

Mi Hazánk Mozgalom is the largest party in Hungary calling for the reintroducing of the death penalty.

Jobbik have previously promised to restore the death penalty if they come to power as late as 2015.

== Comparison to other countries ==
Hungary's number of executions was tied with the countries Poland and Namibia with 1,988 executions before it was abolished. As time had passed, the notion of capital punishment was slowly but surely being put down as a negative in public opinion in Hungary but in different situations. There was a significant decrease in homicides from 2016 to 2017, but residential crimes are still a significant issue and remain a concern. Hungary is not the only country to be denounced by the European Union on the topic of capital punishment. The European Union had denounced the decision made by the parliament of Papua New Guinea to bring back the death penalty. The European Union holds a strong opposition against the death penalty in its relation to the Action Plan on Human Rights and Democracy. The universal abolition of the death penalty is one of the key priorities of its human rights policy outlined in the EU guidelines on the death penalty. Many citizens and officials in Hungary do not agree with this notion and the reintroduction by Viktor Orbán had not only stirred up EU officials but other countries as well. The EU had stated themselves that they regretted paving the way for the death penalty in Papua New Guinea with the adoption of amendments to the Criminal Code Act. The EU further stated that worldwide capital punishment has been demonstrated with the prohibition of capital punishment. The EU often shows its stance on the death penalty like the fifth World Day against the death penalty, and stated that the abolition of the notion contributes to human integrity and morality.

== Fallout of abolishing the death penalty ==
However, ever since capital punishment was abolished, police officer crimes have only been increasing over time and is now ranked 32nd in the top 86 countries that are having a problem with police officer crimes. These crimes have been prominent even when the death penalty was not abolished; it seems there has been a decrease in the crime rate. The EU state that abolishing capital punishment was a progressive development of human rights, and should be considered in the progress of the right of life given to humans. There was a survey on the topic of bribery within the police community, however, only 150 responded when it was intended to canvass the views of 300 officers. The survey responses also stated that 57 percent believed the police leadership to be morally and professionally incapable of leading a cohesive unit against corruption in their police.

== Public opinion ==
Year	For death penalty (%)	In certain / special cases (%)	Against death penalty (%)	Don't know / Didn't answer (%)
1991	77	—	23	—
2001	64	—	29	7
2002	60	—	32	8
2007	63	7	28	2
2012	55	11	33	1
2015	58	—	37	5
2017	24	52	21	3
