= Manuel Saturio Valencia =

Colombian lawyer

Manuel Saturio Valencia Mena (December 24, 1867 – May 7, 1907) was a Colombian intellectual, lawyer and popular leader who was the last person to be legally executed in Colombia.

== Early life ==
Manuel Saturio Valencia Mena was born on December 24, 1867, in Quibdó, the only son of domestic workers Manuel Saturio Valencia and Tránsito Mena. In his youth, he sang in the city's parish choir, and learned Latin and French from some Capuchin monks. Valencia was considered an outstanding student, so much so that the monks themselves later took charge of his higher studies - he was thus the first Afro-Colombian man admitted to the University of Cauca, where he studied law. When he returned to Quibdó, he aligned himself with the Conservative Party, a minority party in the region. In 1899, when the Thousand Days' War began, Valencia reached the rank of Captain in the government forces. He was self-taught, and worked as a music and singing teacher in several schools; as a judge and municipal ombudsman, and was the first black literary figure in the region. However, due to racial oppression at the time, most of his works remained unpublished.

Valencia had an affair with a young white woman named Deyanira Torrijos Baldrich, the daughter of an important Liberal leader, who later became pregnant with his child. Torrijos' family, wanting to take revenge on him, got Valencia drunk on wine in May 1907, then took his documents and some of her clothes and went to the Carrera Primera in Quibdó. There, they set fire to two houses with thatched roofs, then left. In the aftermath of the fire, an almost burned rag ball, Valencia's belt and some documents containing his name were found among the ashes. In accordance with laws from the Constitution of 1886, he was charged with arson.

== Trial and execution ==
The trial was very brief, lasting only six days between the facts and the conviction, a record in applicating justice in the country. Valencia was accused of having set the fire at Carrera Primera, a neighborhood inhabited predominantly by white Colombians. He was eventually found guilty, sentenced to death and summarily executed via firing squad on May 7, 1907.

Valencia became the last person to be judicially executed in Colombia, as well as an icon and martyr for the movement against white oppression in the country. Some writers have been criticized for overexaggerating several aspects of his life story, including the level of oppression experienced by blacks in contemporary Colombia and the "mythologizing" Valencia as a martyr.

== See also ==
- List of most recent executions by jurisdiction
