= Joseph Solomon (murderer) =

Joseph Solomon (died 17 October 1995) was a convicted murderer and was the most recent person to have been executed by Saint Lucia.

Solomon was convicted of murder and rape in 1979 and sentenced to death, which was mandatory for murder under Saint Lucian law. However, his sentence was commuted to life imprisonment by the government. In 1993, after serving fourteen years in prison, Solomon was pardoned and released from prison. The next year, Solomon was arrested for the murder of a woman who had employed him to be her gardener At his 1994 trial, he was again sentenced to death by hanging.

Solomon was executed on 17 October 1995, with another prisoner acting as the hangman. It was the first execution in Saint Lucia since 1986. Since Solomon's execution, no prisoner has been put to death by Saint Lucia.

== See also ==
- List of most recent executions by jurisdiction
