= Rosendo Rodriguez =

American murderer (1980–2018)

Rosendo Rodriguez III
- Mugshot of Rosendo Rodriguez
- Born: March 26, 1980; Wichita Falls, Texas, U.S.
- Died: March 27, 2018 (aged 38); Huntsville Unit, Texas, U.S.
- Other name: The Suitcase Killer
- Status: Executed by lethal injection
- Conviction: Capital murder
- Penalty: Death (May 14, 2008)

Details
- Victims: Joanna Rogers, 16; Summer Baldwin, 29
- Date: c. May 4, 2004 (Rogers) c. September 12, 2005 (Baldwin)

Rosendo Rodriguez III (March 26, 1980 – March 27, 2018) was an American murderer sentenced to death and executed in Texas for the September 2005 rape and murder of 29-year-old Summer Baldwin in Lubbock, Texas.

Rodriguez, a Marine reservist with no prior criminal convictions, was in Lubbock for training at the time of the murder, and was also found to be responsible for the murder of 16-year-old Joanna Rogers in the same city the preceding May (the killings were linked by Rodriguez's modus operandi, as both victims were found stuffed into suitcases which ended up in the same Lubbock landfill). Rodriguez was executed at the Huntsville Unit on March 27, 2018, the day after his 38th birthday.

== Background ==
Rodriguez was born on March 26, 1980, in Wichita Falls, northern Texas. He allegedly faced abuse from his alcoholic and domineering father, Rosendo Rodriguez Jr. He attended Texas Tech University in Lubbock, and had worked as an office clerk and as a fast food worker, as well as serving as a Marine reservist.

== Murders ==
On September 13, 2005, the body of Summer Lee Baldwin was found in a suitcase in a Lubbock landfill. She had been raped and suffered numerous beatings, but had died from positional asphyxia after being stuffed in the suitcase. Summer, a 29-year-old native of Washington state, was working as a sex worker in Lubbock when she disappeared two days earlier, and had also been serving as a witness in a federal counterfeiting case, bringing her murder to the attention of the FBI. Summer was also around 10 weeks pregnant when she was killed, which served as an aggravating factor at Rodriguez's 2008 trial. Rodriguez was linked to the killing via a UPC on the suitcase, and he had been arrested by September 15. He was also identified on CCTV footage as having bought the suitcase from a nearby Walmart in the early hours of September 12. In addition, in Rodriguez's hotel room were found a tag from the suitcase, a used condom, blood spatter from Summer Baldwin and latex gloves with DNA from Rodriguez and Summer Baldwin on them. In October 2006, the remains of Joanna Kathryn Rogers were found in the same landfill as that of Summer Baldwin after an extensive search. Joanna had been missing since May 2004.

During his interrogation, Rodriguez claimed that he and Summer entered a hotel room on the night of September 11, had consensual sex through the early hours of September 12, and that Rodriguez strangled her after she pulled a knife on him. He told a similar story regarding Rogers, who he claimed became violent after he refused to pay her for having sex with him.

== Trial, appeals, and execution ==
Rodriguez was initially offered a plea deal that involved him pleading guilty to the murders of both women, but he refused at the last minute. He was convicted of the capital murder of Summer, and he was sentenced to death by lethal injection. During his incarceration, he contributed to inmate blog Minutes before Six on matters of criminal justice and politics.

Rodriguez's lawyer appealed the sentence based on a potential Brady disclosure violation by District Attorney Matt Powell for failing to disclose information regarding activities of the medical examiner who performed one of the autopsies.

On October 30, 2017, an appeal by Rodriguez to the US Supreme Court was denied. He was executed as scheduled on March 27, 2018.

In his final statement he called for investigation of Powell and medical examiner Sridhar Natarajan, saying they had been involved in multiple wrongful convictions. He also called for a boycott of Texas businesses until capital punishment is ended there.

== See also ==
- Capital punishment in Texas
- List of people executed in Texas, 2010–2019
- List of people executed in the United States in 2018

Executions carried out in Texas
| Preceded by John Battaglia February 1, 2018 | Rosendo Rodriguez; March 27, 2018 | Succeeded by Erick Daniel Davila April 25, 2018 |
Executions carried out in the United States
| Preceded by Carlton Gary – Georgia March 15, 2018 | Rosendo Rodriguez – Texas; March 27, 2018 | Succeeded by Walter Moody – Alabama April 19, 2018 |
