= Ernő Vadász =

Executed Hungarian murderer

Ernő Vadász (May 6, 1960 – July 14, 1988) was a Hungarian man who was sentenced to death and subsequently hanged for the torture-murder of a man in Tiszacsege in 1988, amidst a series of violent robberies. He is the last person to be executed in the country, as Hungary abolished the death penalty two years later.

== Early life ==
Ernő Vadász was born on May 6, 1960, in Tiszacsege. He claimed to have had a difficult childhood and started doing small-time crimes from an early age, due to which he had been repeatedly incarcerated in prison. Upon release, Vadász would frequently get himself drunk and reoffend again, preferring to spend his time drinking alcohol at the local pubs than to search for a job. He and his friend, István Lakatos, became feared by local residents, as the two men were known for their violent tempers and inclination towards criminal behavior.

== Robberies and murder ==
On November 10, 1986, the two friends met as per usual at the local bar. During their drinking session, the pair turned their attention towards József Hajdú, for whom other customers had gossiped that he lived alone. Upon learning this, Vadász and Lakatos decided to rob him.

Later that night, the two men entered the house through the open front door and woke Hajdú up, shining a flashlight directly into his eyes. They then dragged him out of bed, twisted his hands behind his back and tied them with an electric cord, before also covering his head with a sheet. While searching through the apartment, the pair took turns beating their captive who, being relatively poor, could only offer them bacon, which further angered them. While Vadász dismantled the radio and TV, Lakatos forced Hajdú to play a game of chess with him while they waited. After they were finished, the pair threatened the man they would burn his house down if he reported them to the police, before finally fleeing the crime scene. In total, they had stolen 350 forints in cash, some razorblades and a table clock.

A month later, on December 10, having run out of money, Vadász and Lakatos decided to rob another local, Imre Juhász, and then steal his money. The pair rode their bicycles to his house on Dobó Street, where they broke in, knocked him on the ground and pulled his trousers to search him. To their disappointment, Juhász had not collected his paycheck on that day, and instead, they decided to steal his documents, a gas lighter, two packs of cigarettes and a half of litre of brandy. However, when he began to regain consciousness, Lakatos and Vadász started kicking him in the head, before the latter climbed on some nearby furniture and jumped onto their victim's stomach, causing him severe pain. While Juhász lay dying, the criminals stuffed a plastic bag down his throat and promptly left, leaving him to succumb to his injuries.

Subsequent investigations revealed that Vadász and Lakatos continued their crimes, stealing bicycles, bottles of beer and money whenever they could. They also attacked and beat up an older acquaintance after burgling into his apartment, but as there was no money to be stolen, they took whatever valuables they could find. Their final attack was the break-in of a restaurant, from where they stole 4,000 forints, a calculator and several packs of cigarettes.

== Arrest, trial and sentence ==
On January 6, 1987, both Vadász and Lakatos, who were well known to local police, were arrested and charged with the murder, as well as several counts of robbery and fraud. On January 12, 1988, both were found guilty, with Vadász receiving a death sentence for the crime of premeditated murder, two counts of robbery, theft and fraud, while Lakatos was handed an 18-year prison term and a 10-year deprivation of civil rights for the same offences.

Both men appealed their respective sentences to the Curia, but Justice György Pálinkás rejected their appeal on May 18, 1988, stating that the established facts confirmed their guilt in the murder. Vadász then petitioned for clemency, but his request was denied by the Presidential Council, which finalized his death sentence.

== Execution ==
A day before his scheduled execution, Vadász was interviewed on death row by János Farkas, a journalist for the Hajdú-Bihari Napló. During said interview, Vadász avoided questions about his personal life or to explain his actions, and instead commented on his intentions to commit suicide by bashing his head against the toilet seat, as he did not want to be executed.

His threats did not come to fruition, and on the following day at 5:00 AM, Vadász was hanged at the Budapest Prison and Detention Center in Budapest by executioner György Pradlik. After the abolition of the death sentence in 1990, the judge who handed down Vadász's death sentence was interviewed about in 2009, where he reiterated his belief that capital punishment should be retained for certain crimes.

== See also ==
- List of most recent executions by jurisdiction
