= Execution of Robert Van Hook =

2018 execution in Ohio, U.S.

Robert Van Hook
- Van Hook in a 2006 prison photograph
- Born: Robert J. Van Hook; January 14, 1960; Sharonville, Ohio, U.S.
- Died: July 18, 2018 (aged 58); Southern Ohio Correctional Facility, Lucasville, Ohio, U.S.
- Cause of death: Execution by lethal injection
- Motive: Homophobia, robbery
- Convictions: Aggravated murder Aggravated robbery
- Penalty: Death (July 30, 1985)

Details
- Victims: David Lyman Self, 25
- Date: February 18, 1985

The execution of Robert Van Hook occurred on July 18, 2018, at the Southern Ohio Correctional Facility in Lucasville, Ohio. Van Hook was executed via lethal injection for the 1985 murder of 25-year-old David Self. His case achieved notoriety because of his failed gay panic defense. Ultimately, his conviction was upheld by the U.S. Supreme Court and Governor John Kasich of Ohio rejected his bids for clemency.

The execution garnered new attention and significance in December 2020, when Governor Mike DeWine announced that the state of Ohio would no longer execute death row inmates via lethal injection. Since the execution of Van Hook, there has been an unofficial moratorium on capital punishment in the state, as a result of the unavailability of the drugs needed to carry out lethal injection. DeWine indicated no executions would be carried out until the Ohio General Assembly approves a new method of execution. As a result, Van Hook remains the last person executed in Ohio by lethal injection. If no new alternative execution method is found, he will also remain the last person executed in the state of Ohio.

== Background ==
On February 18, 1985, 25-year-old Robert J. Van Hook went to a bar in downtown Cincinnati, which was popular among gay men. At the bar, he met 25-year-old David Self. The two left the bar together and went to Self's Hyde Park apartment where Van Hook attacked Self and strangled him until he was unconscious. He then stabbed Self to death with a knife that he took from the kitchen, ransacked the apartment, stole some jewelry, mutilated Self's body, and fled to Fort Lauderdale, Florida. He evaded detection until April 1, 1985, when he was arrested by Oakland Park police.

== Trial ==
Van Hook was indicted for the offenses of aggravated murder and aggravated robbery. He confessed the murder to police and admitted his motive had been to lure a gay man with the intention of robbing him. According to court records, Van Hook had been robbing gay men since the age of 15. At his trial, Van Hook pleaded not guilty by reason of insanity and chose to have his case heard by a three-judge panel instead of a jury. Van Hook was convicted of the crime and was sentenced to death on July 30, 1985.

=== Homosexual panic defense ===
Van Hook's case garnered national attention when his defense team claimed "homosexual panic" may have prompted the killing. However, his gay panic defense failed, with the courts noting Van Hook's history of robbing gay men prior to the murder of Self.

== Execution ==
The execution of Van Hook took place on July 18, 2018, at the Southern Ohio Correctional Facility in Lucasville, Ohio. His last meal consisted of double cheeseburgers, fries, strawberry cheesecake with whipped cream, a vanilla milkshake, and grapefruit juice. In his final statement he apologized to the family of Self and recited an adapted Norse prayer which appeared in the movie The 13th Warrior. Van Hook was executed via lethal injection using a combination of three drugs; midazolam, rocuronium bromide and potassium chloride. He was pronounced dead at 10:44 a.m. EST.

== Future of capital punishment in Ohio ==
Van Hook's execution continued to attract attention. Following his execution via lethal injection, controversy arose regarding Ohio's execution protocol. In January 2019, a federal judge ruled that Ohio's execution protocol could cause inmates severe pain and needless suffering. Because of this, Governor Mike DeWine, who assumed office as governor of Ohio in January 2019, ordered the Ohio prison system to examine alternative lethal injection drugs that could be used in any future executions. He also delayed all pending executions in Ohio. He later froze all executions in Ohio indefinitely as the state struggled to find new lethal injection drugs.

The execution of Van Hook garnered renewed attention in December 2020, when DeWine announced that lethal injection would no longer be an option for any future executions in Ohio. DeWine was quoted as saying, "Lethal injection appears to us to be impossible from a practical point of view today." He ruled that lawmakers must choose a different method of execution for death row inmates before they can be put to death in the future. He also said that no executions would occur in Ohio in 2021, which had not executed any inmate since Van Hook in 2018. At the time, DeWine said he was far more skeptical of the practice because of the long delays between crime and punishment. He also stated that he had previously supported capital punishment mainly because he believed it acted as a deterrent to crime, something he was now less certain of.

Because of the new ruling, Van Hook remains the last person executed in Ohio by lethal injection. DeWine also stated that he does not see much support for selecting a new method of execution as a priority, meaning Ohio is unlikely to execute any inmate for the foreseeable future, or possibly even indefinitely. This could also mean Van Hook will remain the last person executed in the state of Ohio if a new method of execution is not selected or approved.

As of 2026, Van Hook remains the most recent person to be executed by the state of Ohio, which has gone more than seven years without an execution. The future of capital punishment in the state is still unclear.

On June 16, 2026, DeWine announced that he believed Ohio should abolish the death penalty entirely. He argued that the punishment is no longer a deterrent to violent crime. Former Ohio governor Bob Taft, who oversaw all executions in Ohio from 1999 to 2007, said in a statement that he agreed with DeWine. However, Republican House Speaker Matt Huffman said he would "vigorously oppose" any effort to abolish the death penalty, a position that was supported by former Ohio attorney general Dave Yost.

== See also ==
- Capital punishment in Ohio
- Capital punishment in the United States
- List of most recent executions by jurisdiction
- List of people executed in Ohio
- List of people executed in the United States in 2018

Executions carried out in Ohio
Preceded by Gary Otte September 13, 2017	Robert Van Hook; July 18, 2018	Succeeded by most recent
Executions carried out in the United States
Preceded by Christopher Young – Texas July 17, 2018	Robert Van Hook – Ohio; July 18, 2018	Succeeded by William Ray Irick – Tennessee August 9, 2018
