= Walter Moody =

American convicted murderer (1935–2018)

- Moody in a 2017 prison photograph
- Born: March 24, 1935; Rex, Georgia, U.S.
- Died: April 19, 2018 (aged 83); Holman Correctional Facility, Alabama, U.S.
- Other name: Roy Moody
- Criminal status: Executed by lethal injection
- Spouse(s): Hazel Moody (unknown–1972); Susan McBride
- Convictions: Federal; Possessing a bomb (Note: plus 71 other counts in relation to the murders of Judge Robert Vance and Robert Robinson.); Alabama; Capital murder
- Criminal penalty: Federal; 5-year term (bomb possession) (October 19, 1972); Life imprisonment (murders) (August 21, 1991); Alabama; Death (February 10, 1997)

Details
- Victims: (1) Hazel Moody (injured) (2) Judge Robert S. Vance Sr. (murdered) (2) Helen Vance (injured) (3) Robert E. Robinson (murdered)
- Date: (1) May 7, 1972 (2) December 16, 1989 (3) December 18, 1989
- Date apprehended: July 13, 1990

Walter Leroy Moody Jr. (March 24, 1935 – April 19, 2018) was an American convicted murderer who was sentenced to death and executed in Alabama for the 1989 letter bomb murder of Robert S. Vance, a U.S. federal judge serving on the Court of Appeals for the 11th Circuit.

When Moody was executed by lethal injection in April 2018, he became the oldest death row inmate to be executed since the death penalty was reinstated in 1976.

== Life ==
Moody was born on March 24, 1935, in Rex, Georgia, and grew up in Fort Valley. He grew up as the oldest of three children and spent much of his time "tinkering with machinery". He graduated from Peach County High School in 1953, and held a multitude of military positions in the years leading up to 1961.

Following his departure from the military, Moody resumed his education. Taking classes at a small college, he considered becoming a neurosurgeon but he did not make good grades. He was later able to take some law school classes. After a psychiatric evaluation in 1967, he was characterized as harboring violent thoughts, and the doctor evaluating him, Thomas M. Hall, testified that he was ''constantly afraid'' that Moody might get into a situation that would end up in ''some sort of destruction toward society.''

On May 7, 1972, Moody's wife, Hazel, opened a package she found in their kitchen. It turned out to be a homemade pipe bomb that exploded in front of her, tearing up her hand, thigh and shoulder, and sending scrap metal into her eye. She required six operations to deal with all of her injuries. Moody was tried for making the bomb with intent to send it to an auto dealer who had repossessed Moody's car, and on October 19, 1972, he was found not guilty of making the bomb, but was convicted of possessing it and sentenced to five years in the Atlanta Federal Penitentiary.

Moody and his wife were divorced shortly after his conviction.

In 1983, Moody was charged with attempted murder after he was accused of attempting to drown 3 of his boating business employees. According to the employees, Moody abandoned them in a boat under the pretense of taking underwater photographs of the boat's propeller. He refused to give them life preservers, and threw an anchor at one of the employees. The employees were rescued by another boat in the area. It was later revealed that Moody had taken out $750,000 in life insurance on each of the employees prior to the incident. The trial lead to a hung jury and the trial was not retried.

After the trial, Moody filed a federal lawsuit against the employees, the deputy that arrested him, the sheriff, and the county prosecutor under the grounds of malicious prosecution, requesting $1.5 million in actual damages. The case's appeal was heard by federal judge Robert Smith Vance, his future victim, who was skeptical of Moody's case.

== Vance's murder and connected bombings ==
On December 16, 1989, federal judge Robert Vance was assassinated at his home in Mountain Brook, Alabama, when he opened a package containing a makeshift pipe bomb. Vance died instantly and his wife, Helen, was seriously injured. After an extensive investigation, Moody and his second wife, Susan McBride, were arrested on July 13, 1990. McBride was released on $250,000 bail within a week and later testified against Moody pursuant to an immunity agreement.

Moody was charged with the murders of Judge Vance and of Robert E. Robinson, a black civil-rights attorney based in Savannah, Georgia, who had been killed in a separate explosion at his office two days later on Monday, December 18, 1989. Moody was also charged with mailing bombs that were defused at the Eleventh Circuit Court's headquarters in Atlanta and at the Jacksonville, Florida, office of Willye Dennis of the NAACP.

Louis J. Freeh, who prosecuted the federal case at Robert Mueller’s behest, said that the bombings at the offices of both Robinson and the NAACP were meant to deflect attention away from Moody. Moody's killing of Vance and his attempted bombing of the Eleventh Circuit were motivated by the Court's refusal to expunge Moody's conviction for the 1972 explosion in his home, despite the fact that Vance was neither on the panel that made that decision, nor was he responsible for its decision.

== Trial, death row, and execution ==
After an order was entered directing the recusal of all circuit and district judges within the Eleventh Circuit, Moody's trial for murder and related crimes was presided over by Judge Edward Devitt, of the District of Minnesota. After a successful prosecution by special prosecutors Louis Freeh and Howard Shapiro, Moody was convicted on all counts. He was sentenced to seven federal life terms. An Alabama state-court jury later convicted Moody of Judge Vance's murder; in 1997 Moody was sentenced to death by electrocution. He remained on death row at the Holman Correctional Facility near Atmore, Alabama, from February 13, 1997.

Moody was alleged to have attempted to run a fraudulent business scheme from death row some time around 2015, according to an anonymous elderly Florida woman who spoke to Alabama media. She claimed to have received a letter asking her to invest in a new business. The letter had a Holman Correctional Facility return address from Moody. However, Moody was not known to have faced any disciplinary action as a result.

On February 23, 2018, an execution date for Moody was set for April 19, 2018. He was subsequently executed on this date, at 8:42 p.m. Aged 83 years and 26 days at execution, he was the oldest inmate executed in the United States in the post-Furman era, surpassing the previous record set by the execution of John B. Nixon Sr., who was executed in Mississippi in December 2005 at the age of 77 years, 8 months and 13 days. Moody declined to make a final statement and his last meal was Philly cheesesteaks, Dr Pepper, and M&M's.

== In popular culture ==
The case was featured in the episode "Deadly Delivery" of Forensic Files which first aired on October 29, 1998. It was also featured in the episode "Living in Terror" of The New Detectives.

== See also ==
- List of people executed in Alabama
- List of people executed in the United States in 2018

== Notes ==
Executions carried out in Alabama
Preceded by Michael Wayne Eggers March 15, 2018	Walter Leroy Moody Jr. April 19, 2018	Succeeded by Domineque Hakim Marcelle Ray February 7, 2019
Executions carried out in the United States
Preceded by Rosendo Rodriguez III – Texas March 27, 2018	Walter Leroy Moody Jr. – Alabama; April 19, 2018	Succeeded by Erick Daniel Davila – Texas April 25, 2018
