= Chaklala =

Town in Pakistan

Chaklala چک لالہ کنٹونمنٹ
- Town
- Chaklala Cantonment
- Location within Pakistan
- Coordinates: 33°36′00″N 73°06′20″E
- Country: Pakistan
- Province: (Punjab, Pakistan) Punjab
- District: Rawalpindi District
- Union Council: Chaklala

Area
  - Total: 34.01 km^{2} (13.13 sq mi)
- Elevation: 487 m (1,598 ft)

Population (2023)
  - Total: 333,115
  - Density: 9,794.62/km^{2} (25,367.9/sq mi)
- Time zone: UTC+5 (PST)
- Postal code: 46200
- Calling code: 051
- Website: www.ccb.gov.pk

Chaklala is a major suburban town of Rawalpindi in the Punjab province of Pakistan. It covers an area of 34.01 km^{2} (13.13 sq mi) (8,405 acres). The population of the town is 333,115, according to the 2023 census.

Chaklala Cantonment is one of the three components of Rawalpindi Tehsil (sub-district) together with Rawalpindi Metropolitan Corporation and Rawalpindi Cantonment. The tehsil is part of the wider Islamabad–Rawalpindi metropolitan area, which has a population of more than 6 million people.

It is situated astride the Airport Road, to the east of Grand Trunk Road on the main railway line. The town has its own railway station Chaklala Railway Station which is located less than 1 kilometer away from Benazir Bhutto International Airport. On the west, it is bordered by Islamabad Expressway being connected through the Koral interchange.

A large commercial market in Chaklala Scheme III is a major shopping area for the residents in Chaklala. The market comprises a lot of restaurants and shopping areas and a hangout spot for the younger people. There is also a cinema and retail complex located at Jinnah Park on Airport Road which is another area where residents venture out during evenings.

== Demography ==
Chaklala has a population of around 333,115 according to the 2023 census.

The major ethnic groups in the area are Punjabis who speak Pothwari and a large number of Kashmiris who have also settled in the area after independence in 1947. Since Chaklala has a major army garrison and an airforce base as well, a large number of military families are also housed here from all over Pakistan. Chaklala Airforce Base provides strategic transport to Pakistan's political and military leadership.

There is a small hindu community in the region with Valmik Swamiji Mandir being the major place of worship.

== Chaklala Cantonment ==
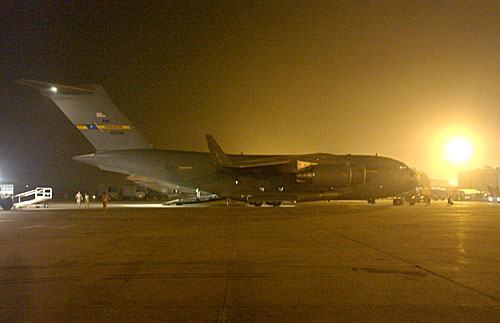
USAF C-17 at Chaklala Airport

The Chaklala Garrison is a principle military locality situated within Chaklala containing the Joint Staff Headquarters (JS HQ). Along with Chaklala Airbase, renamed as PAF Base Nur Khan, both are part of Chaklala Cantonment area. Most of the military facilities, buildings, mobility support workshops had been built by the British Army and the Royal Air Force during the time of British Raj. In 2002, the Ministry of Defence had split Chaklala from the larger Rawalpindi Cantonment to improve security around the Army GHQ and provide better administration in both the cantonments. Before 2002, Rawalpindi Cantonment was the largest of all cantonments in Pakistan which was creating an administrative problem in providing municipal services to the area due to rapid urban growth.

PAF Base Nur Khan is an important air base of the Pakistan Air Force. It provides strategic transport for logistics, VIP personnel and is the premier air base for defending the capital Islamabad from any air intrusion.

== Housing societies and neighbourhoods ==
Chaklala consists of the below housing societies and neighbourhoods:

- Airport Housing Society
- Askari Housing (Phase - I, II, III, IV, V, VI, VIII, IX, X & XII)
- Askari Villas
- Bostan Valley
- Chaklala Housing Schemes (I, II & III)
- Dhoke Raja Muhammad Khan
- Dhoke Chaudhrian
- Dhoke Chiragh Deen
- Dhoke Gangal
- Eastridge Housing Scheme
- Fazaia Colony
- Dhoke Lalyal
- Fazal Town (Phase 1 & 2)
- Gharibabad
- Gulbahar Scheme
- Gulistan Colony
- Gulrez Housing Scheme
- Gulzar-e-Quaid
- Habib Town
- Judicial Colony
- Rahimabad
- Dhoke Kashmirian
- Railway Housing Scheme - Chaklala
- Shah Faisal Colony
- Shah Khalid Colony
- Walayat Colony

== Transportation ==
=== Roads ===
==== Grand Trunk Road ====
Grand Trunk Road (N-5) passes through the area.

==== Airport Road ====
This major route connects the area with the city center of Rawalpindi and provides a route to the capital city of Islamabad. It extends from the Ammar Shaheed Chowk Roundabout to the Koraal Chowk/Koraal Chowk Intersection. The Benazir Bhutto International Airport and the adjacent Pakistan Air Force Base Chaklala are located along this road. It is a modern six-lane road. Two fly-overs have been constructed to reduce the load of traffic at the busiest sections of the road, closer to the Ammar Shaheed Chowk Roundabout (2009) and at Koral Chowk (2017), respectively. The route serves as the main artery connecting the twin cities of Rawalpindi and Islamabad.

==== Rawal Road ====
It runs along the western perimeter of the Benazir Bhutto International Airport. The road connects the busy traffic arteries of Benazir Bhutto Road alternatively known as Murree Road and Airport Road. It is a newly carpeted four-lane road.

=== Railway ===
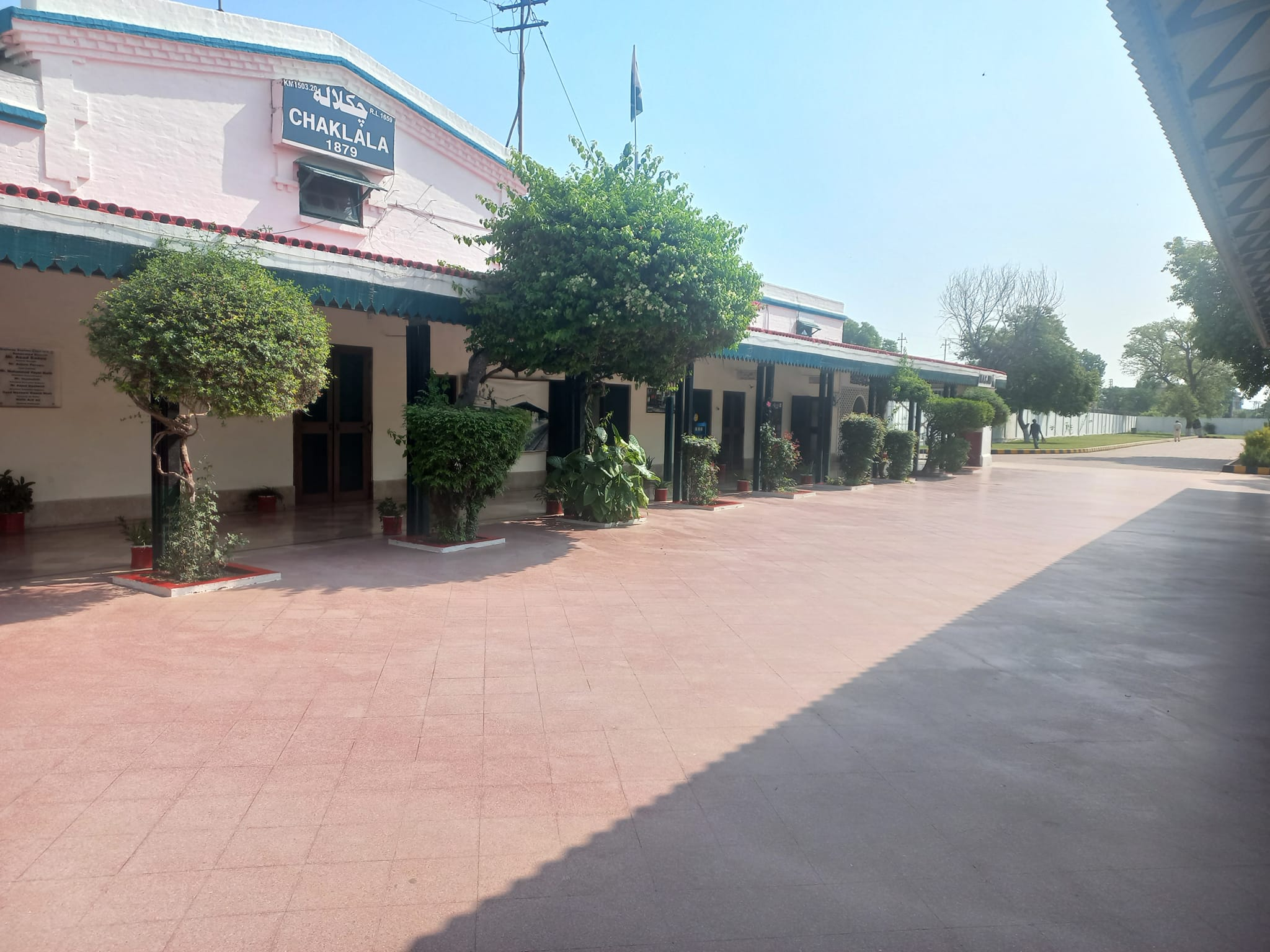
Chaklala Railway Station

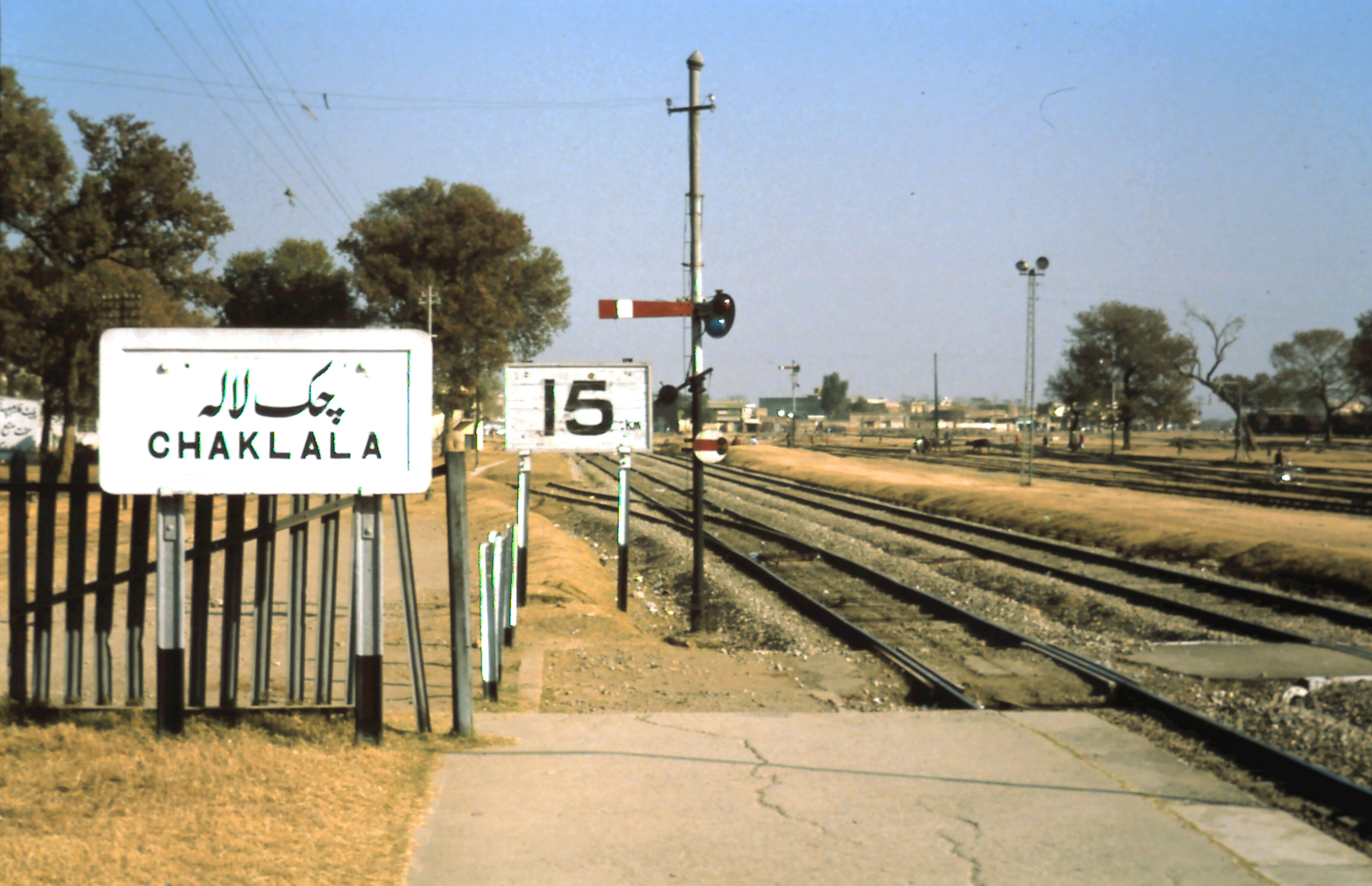
Platform View

The main trunk railway line of Pakistan Railways passes through the town. Chaklala Railway Station is one of the main railway stops for trains travelling between Peshawar and Karachi. Chaklala Dry Port is a dry port which handles freight trains.

=== Airport ===
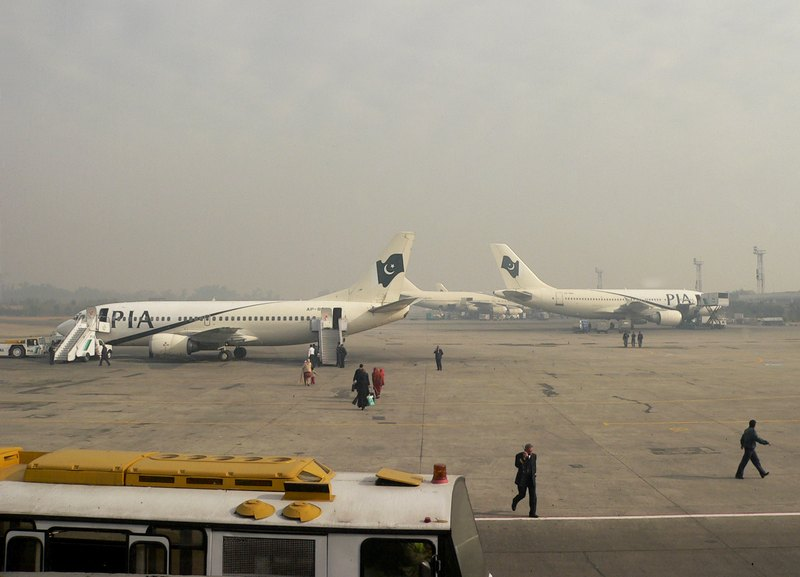
Chaklala Airport

The former Benazir Bhutto International Airport is an important landmark in the area. The airport was shared with the PAF Base Nur Khan. The former airport is now used for VIP flights and for receiving state guests. Commercial flights have shifted to the new Islamabad International Airport

== Parks ==
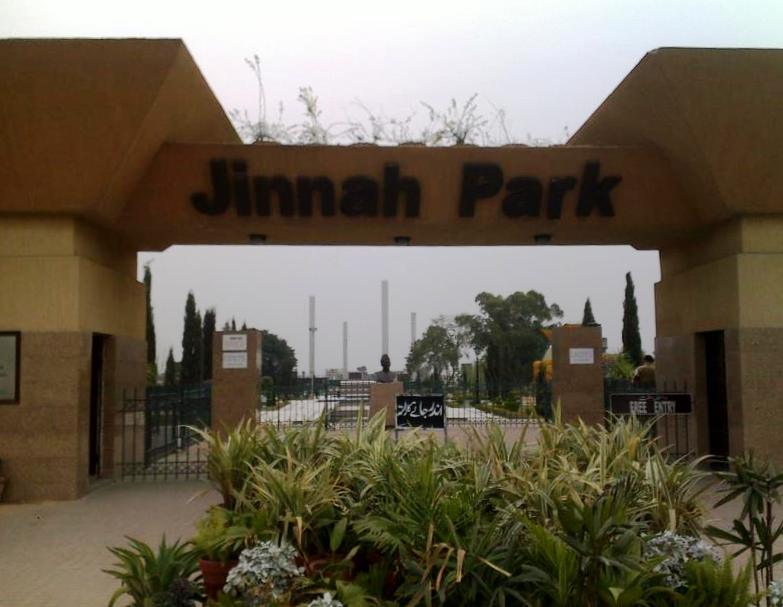
Jinnah park

In 2006, Jinnah Park (Urdu: جناح پارک) was inaugurated in Chaklala and has since become a hotspot of activity for the city of Rawalpindi. It houses a state-of-the-art cinema, Cinepax, a Metro Cash and Carry supermart, an outlet of McDonald's, gaming lounges, Motion Rides and other recreational facilities. The vast lawns also provide an adequate picnic spot.

== Pakistan Television Corporation ==
Pakistan Television Corporation's Islamabad Centre was initially set up at Chaklala before it was shifted to its present location in Islamabad.

== Educational institutions ==
Some of the educational institutes located in Chaklala:

- Army Public School & College For Boys, Chaklala Garrison
- Army Public School & College For Girls, Chaklala Garrison
- Joint Staff Public School and College, Chaklala
- FG Quaid-e-Azam Public School
- Pakistan Air Force College Chaklala (PAF Base Chaklala)
- Fazaia Intermediate College, Chaklala (PAF Base Chaklala)
- Fazaia Intermediate College, Jinnah Camp, Chaklala (Khanna Road)
- Bilquis College of Education for Women (Mujahida Academy)
- Army Public School and College (FWO campus), Gracy Lines, Chaklala
- FG Boys High School, Gracy Lines, Chaklala
- FG Girls High School, Gracy Lines, Chaklala
- Fauji Foundation Model School, Chaklala
- Sir Syed Science College, Chaklala
- Allied Schools, Chaklala
- Government Degree College For Women
- The Educators School System, Airport Road Campus
