= Wilson v. Sellers =

- Supreme Court of the United States

Argued October 30, 2017 Decided April 17, 2018
- Full case name: Marion Wilson v. Eric Sellers, Warden
- Docket no.: 16-6855
- Citations: 584 U.S. 122 (more) 138 S. Ct. 1188; 200 L. Ed. 2d 530

Case history
- Prior: Wilson v. Warden, 774 F.3d 671 (11th Cir. 2014); remanded on rehearing en banc, 834 F.3d 1227 (11th Cir. 2016); cert. granted, 137 S. Ct. 1203 (2017).
- Subsequent: petition denied, 898 F.3d 1314 (11th Cir 2018)

Holding
- A federal court sitting in a habeas corpus proceeding should "look through" an unexplained, summary ruling to the last related state-court decision that provides a relevant rationale and presume that the unexplained decision adopted the same reasoning. The State may rebut the presumption by showing that the unexplained decision most likely relied on different grounds than the reasoned decision below.

Court membership
- Chief Justice John Roberts Associate Justices Anthony Kennedy · Clarence Thomas; Ruth Bader Ginsburg · Stephen Breyer; Samuel Alito · Sonia Sotomayor; Elena Kagan · Neil Gorsuch

Case opinions
- Majority: Breyer, joined by Roberts, Kennedy, Ginsburg, Sotomayor, Kagan
- Dissent: Gorsuch, joined by Thomas, Alito

Laws applied
- Antiterrorism and Effective Death Penalty Act of 1996

Wilson v. Sellers, 584 U.S. ___ (2018), is a United States Supreme Court case in which the court held that a federal court sitting in a habeas corpus proceeding should "look through" an unexplained, summary ruling to the last related state-court decision that provides a relevant rationale and presume that the unexplained decision adopted the same reasoning. The State may rebut the presumption by showing that the unexplained decision most likely relied on different grounds than the reasoned decision below.

== Background ==
In 1997, a Georgia jury convicted Marion Wilson of murder and sentenced him to death. In December 1999, the Supreme Court of Georgia affirmed on direct appeal. Wilson next petitioned for a writ of habeas corpus in state court. The petition was denied in a written opinion by the state superior court, which was summarily affirmed by the state supreme court, and denied review by the U.S. Supreme Court.

Wilson then filed another petition for habeas corpus, now in the United States District Court for the Middle District of Georgia, which was denied. In December 2014, a unanimous panel of the United States Court of Appeals for the Eleventh Circuit affirmed, also rejecting Wilson's petition. In August 2016, the full en banc Eleventh Circuit again rejected the petition by a vote of 6–5, with Circuit Judge William H. Pryor Jr. writing for the majority and Circuit Judges Adalberto Jordan and Jill A. Pryor writing dissents.

== Opinion of the court ==
The Court announced judgment in favor of the prisoner on April 17, 2018, reversing and remanding to the lower court by a vote of 6–3. Justice Stephen Breyer wrote for the Court, joined by Chief Justice John Roberts, as well as Justices Anthony Kennedy, Ruth Bader Ginsburg, Sonia Sotomayor, and Elena Kagan. The Court held that the circuit had erred under the Antiterrorism and Effective Death Penalty Act of 1996 by failing to consider the reasoning in the lower, earlier, written, state court opinion. Justice Neil Gorsuch, joined by Justices Clarence Thomas and Samuel Alito, dissented.

== Subsequent developments ==
In August 2018, the Eleventh Circuit again denied Wilson's petition, in another opinion by Judge Pryor. Wilson was executed by lethal injection on June 20, 2019.
