= Jinnah Park =

Amusement and public park in Rawalpindi, Pakistan

- جناح پارک
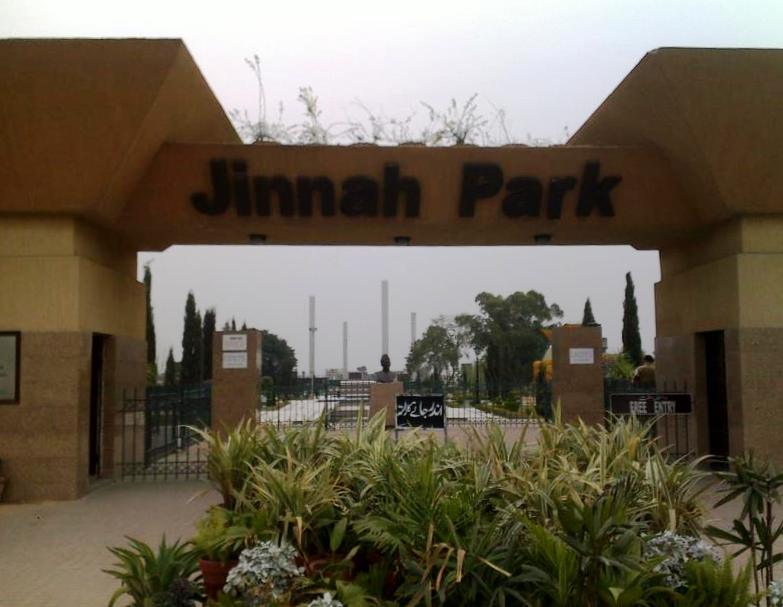
- Park’s second entrance with the Unity Towers in the background
- Interactive map of Jinnah Park
- Address: Airport Road, Chaklala Cantonment
- Location: Rawalpindi, Punjab, Pakistan
- Coordinates: 33°35′05″N 73°04′25″E
- Owner: Rawalpindi Development Authority
- Operator: Rawalpindi Development Authority
- Type: Public and amusement park
- Parking: 1,000-plus spaces

Construction
- Opened: 2006; 20 years ago

Jinnah Park (Urdu: جناح پارک) is an amusement and public park located on Airport Road in the high-security Chaklala Cantonment suburb of Rawalpindi, Pakistan. It is the town's primary amusement park and covers an area of approximately 17 hectares (42 acres). Initial plans for its development began as early as 1995 and it was opened in 2006. It was named after Quaid-e-Azam Muhammad Ali Jinnah, the founder and first Governor-General of Pakistan. Sculptures of Jinnah and his family name are placed at the park's main entrance.

== History ==
The site for the park was previously occupied by the maximum security District Jail Rawalpindi which opened in 1882. Former president and prime minister of Pakistan, Zulfikar Ali Bhutto was notably imprisoned here before being executed on 4 April 1979. The exact spot where the gallows stood is unknown. The prison was demolished in 1988 after the completion of construction of Central Jail Rawalpindi, commonly known as Adiala Jail, in 1986.

The construction of the park began in 1995, when Rawalpindi Development Authority (RDA) tasked Capital Development Authority (CDA) to build the park. In 2004, the incomplete project was passed on to Pakistan Army's X Corps and after facing delays, it finally opened in 2006. RDA spent at least 329 million Pakistani rupees on the project.

== Attractions ==
Jinnah Park houses Pakistan's first multiplex called "Cinepax", the first one by the company of the same name. It has a McDonald's Restaurant which offers both counter service, with both indoor and outdoor seating available, and drive-thru service, 24 hours a day. It also houses a PlayPlace – an indoor playground. There is a KFC restaurant located right next to the McDonald's. The park has another restaurant called Diva, a frozen yogurt and gelato chain shop called "Frutti5", Second Cup, Subway, Pappasallis (an Italian chain), and other restaurants and cafes. Tuck-shops are scattered throughout the park. "Cosmo Cash and Carry" retails a wide range of products at a discount, for example, groceries, meat and poultry, frozen foods, dairy products, health and beauty products, appliances etc. The park also has:

- basketball courts
- cricket nets
- football grounds
- a ten-pin bowling club
- dedicated playgrounds
- a skating area with a roller rink
- an open-air gym
- a jogging track
- Motion Rides
- various rides and games for children of all ages
- three mosques or prayer areas
- sitting areas

The park is adorned with lawns, flowerbeds, fountains and sculptures. The park features four sky-high pillars called "Unity Towers", one for each province of Pakistan. The height of each tower represents the size of its province relative to the others, thus the one for Balochistan is the tallest of the four and the one for Khyber Pakhtunkhwa is the shortest. There are four gazebos which are sculptured into enormous headgears, representative of the four provinces, while the seating arrangements underneath make use of the traditional charpais and gāo-takkiyas. During certain hours, the roller rink is open only for children or inexperienced roller skaters.

== Gallery ==
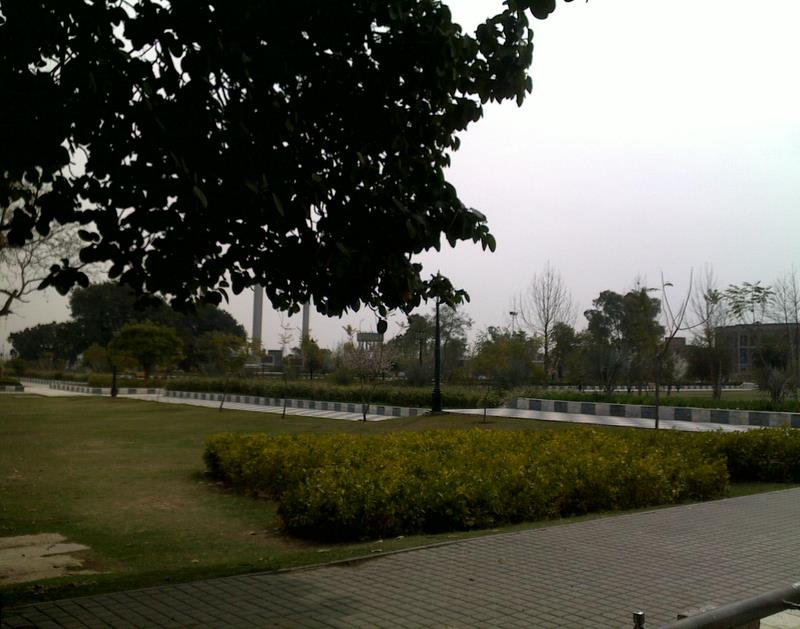
Jinnah Park

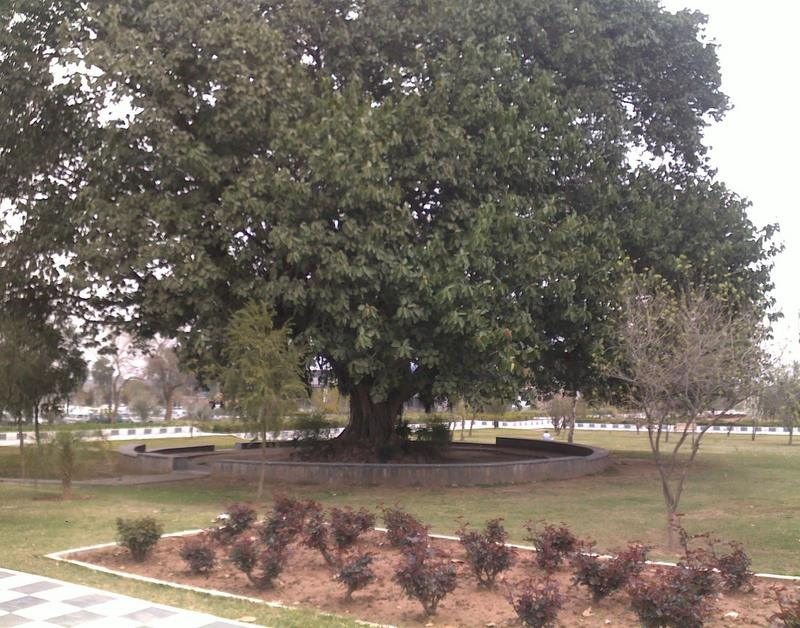
An old tree at Jinnah Park's entrance
