= Douglas Hamlet =

Douglas Hamlet (died 13 February 1995) was a convicted murderer who was executed by Saint Vincent and the Grenadines (SVG). His execution, along with that of Franklin and David Thomas, are the most recent executions performed by SVG, and questions about the fairness of Hamlet's conviction have been raised.

Hamlet was convicted of murder and received a mandatory death sentence. The only evidence against Hamlet was the eyewitness testimony of a 14-year-old girl, who allegedly saw Hamlet committing the crime from a distance of 150 to 220 yards on a rainy day. He continued to maintain his innocence up to his execution. He was executed by hanging.

== General references ==
- Amnesty International, "State killing in the English speaking Caribbean: a legacy of colonial times", 2002-04-23
- Mills, Heather (May 25, 1995). "Life or death, long distance". The Independent.
