= Raja Rizwan =

Pakistani Army officer and military attaché (1958–2019)

Raja Rizwan Haider
- Born: 1958; Khanpur, Rahim Yar Khan
- Died: 24 November 2019 (aged 60–61); Central Jail Rawalpindi
- Cause of death: Execution by hanging
- Alma mater: Cadet College Hasan Abdal
- Military career
- Allegiance: Pakistan
- Branch: Pakistan Army
- Service years: till 2014
- Rank: Brigadier
- Unit: 10th Frontier Force Regiment

Raja Rizwan Ali Haider (Urdu: راجہ رضوان) (1958 – 24 November 2019) was a Pakistan Army officer and military attache.

He was arrested in 2018 on espionage charges, allegedly for passing Pakistani nuclear secrets to the CIA. He was convicted of espionage and treason by a military court in 2019, and was executed by hanging later that year.

== Background ==
Rizwan was born in 1958 in Khanpur, Haripur to a lower middle class farming family.

He first served with the 68th PMA course at Kakul, then was commissioned in the 10th Frontier Force Regiment, serving in the tribal territories.

In 2009, he was assigned to the Pakistani embassy in Berlin as the Defence Attache. He was posted to MODP (Islamabad) in 2012, then applied to retire in 2014, and was working with Zhongba (a Chinese Company) as a security consultant.

== Personal life ==
His father was a Junior Commissioned Officer in the Pakistan Army Corps of Engineers.

== Trial ==
On the eve of 10 October 2018, Brigadier Raja Rizwan was arrested by Intelligence & Military Personnel. On 23 October his son Ali Rizwan Raja petitioned the Islamabad High Court for information. Justice Aamer Farooq sought a report from the authorities. In February 2019, Major General Asif Ghafoor, announced that two senior military officers were being held on espionage charges.

On 30 May 2019, Chief of the Army Staff Gen Qamar Javed Bajwa announced that Brigadier Raja Rizwan, along with another Lt. General Javed and Dr. Waseem Akram, had been tried and convicted of selling nuclear secrets to a foreign power. The announcement did not say who he spied for, although speculation revolved around India and the CIA. Brigadier Raja Rizwan was sentenced to death.

Brigadier Raja Rizwan challenged the military court's verdict in the Military Appellate Court, which dismissed it. Brigadier Raja Rizwan then appealed to the Lahore High Court (LHC). He claimed that the military authorities were not sharing the details related to the trial proceedings.

Brigadier Raja Rizwan was put in Adiala Jail Rawalpindi and executed by hanging on 24 November 2019.
