= Central Jail Rawalpindi =

Prison in Rawalpindi, Punjab, Pakistan

Adiala Jail Rawalpindi
- Interactive map of Adiala Jail Rawalpindi
- Location: Rawalpindi-46606, Punjab, Pakistan; 33°29′14.62″N 73°2′24.49″E
- Status: Punjab
- Security class: Maximum
- Capacity: 1919
- Population: 5082 (4 April 2016)
- Opened: 1986; 40 years ago
- Managed by: Government of Punjab, Pakistan; Government of Pakistan
- Director: Sajid Baig, Senior Superintendent of Jail

Notable prisoners
- Zulfikar Ali Bhutto; 4 April 1979; Nawaz Sharif; 13 July 2018; Asif Ali Zardari; 10 June 2019; Imran Khan; 9 May 2023

Central Jail Rawalpindi (Urdu: اڈیالہ جیل راولپنڈی), also known as Adiala Jail) is a prison located in Rawalpindi, Pakistan.

== History ==
The Central Jail Rawalpindi was built from the late 1970s and early 1980s during the military regime of General Muhammad Zia-ul-Haq, after the execution of Zulfiqar Ali Bhutto, the ex-Prime Minister of Pakistan on 4 April 1979 in District Jail Rawalpindi. The older jail was demolished and converted into Jinnah Park. The jail is situated in Rawalpindi – Adyala Road near village Dahgal about 13 kilometres toward west of district courts and the defunct/demolished old District Jail Rawalpindi. The village Adyala is about 4 kilometres west of the jail.

== Former prisoners ==
- Erik Audé: American actor, stuntman, restaurateur, and professional poker player who was arrested and imprisoned in Pakistan.
- Hanif Abbasi: PMLN Leader Former MNA from Rawalpindi.
- Ayyan Ali: model and singer.
- Muhammad Safdar Awan, son in law of Nawaz Sharif and former Member of the National Assembly (MNA) from Rawalpindi and Mansehra.
- Zulfikar Ali Bhutto: PPP Leader former president, CMLA, and prime minister of Pakistan and father of Mohtarma Benazir Bhutto.
- Yusuf Raza Gillani: PPP Leader Former Prime Minister of Pakistan.
- Mirza Tahir Hussain: Served eighteen years in the jail for the murder/manslaughter of a taxicab driver. Released on 17 November 2006 on parole
- Lieutenant General Javed Iqbal (Retired) – Sentenced to 14 years of rigorous imprisonment by a military court on account of spying. Held key positions in the military during his active service, including director-general of military operations, which is responsible for planning and executing all operations inside and outside of Pakistan. Also held the post of adjutant-general, who supervises discipline and accountability within the forces.
- Zakiur Rehman Lakhvi: alleged November 2008 Mumbai Attacks mastermind. Served six years on terrorism charges.
- Allama Mashriqi: British Indian, and later, Pakistani mathematician, logician, political theorist, Islamic scholar and the founder of the Khaksar movement.
- Maryam Nawaz: PMLN Leader daughter of Nawaz Sharif.
- Mumtaz Qadri: Assassin to the former Punjab Governor Salman Taseer.
- Saifur Rehman, chairman of National Accountability Bureau.
- Raja Rizwan: Pakistan Army Brigadier and military attache – Sentenced to death by a military court on account of spying.
- Nawaz Sharif, PMLN Leader former Prime Minister of Pakistan
- Imran Khan, former PTI Chairman former Prime Minister of Pakistan.

== See also ==
- Government of Punjab, Pakistan
- Headquarter Jail
- National Academy for Prisons Administration
- Punjab Prisons (Pakistan)
- Prison Officer
