= Murder of Donovan Parks =

1996 murder in Georgia, United States

Donovan Parks
- Born: Donovan Corey Parks; July 24, 1971; Milledgeville, Georgia, U.S.
- Died: March 28, 1996 (aged 24); Baldwin County, Georgia, U.S.
- Cause of death: Murder by shooting
- Resting place: Baldwin Memorial Gardens
- Occupation: Corrections officer

On March 28, 1996, Donovan Corey Parks, an American corrections officer, was murdered by two gang members in Baldwin County, Georgia. His two killers, Robert Earl Butts Jr. (May 14, 1977 – May 4, 2018) and Marion Wilson Jr. (July 29, 1976 – June 20, 2019) were executed for the crime by the state of Georgia via lethal injection, in 2018 and 2019, respectively. Wilson was the 1,500th person to be executed in the United States since capital punishment was resumed in 1976.

== Backgrounds ==
=== Donovan Parks ===
Parks was born in 1971 in Milledgeville, Georgia. At the time of his murder, he was working two jobs, one as a prison guard and the other at a Winn-Dixie grocery store. He was trying to make money to study to become a prison counselor. According to his brother, Parks wanted to help inmates facing long prison sentences, as well as inmates who were getting ready to transition back into society. In 1995, Parks' mother died, and less than six months later, the family home caught fire. Following the fire, Parks' brother moved out of Milledgeville and joined the Army.

=== Marion Wilson Jr. ===
Wilson was born in 1976 and was physically abused by his grandfather and his mother's boyfriends as a child. On January 31, 1989, Wilson and two other boys started a fire at an apartment in Glynn County while the residents were home. On December 16, 1991, Wilson shot Jose Luis Valle, a Mexican migrant worker. According to three youths who were with Wilson, he said he was going to rob Valle and "wanted to see what it felt like to shoot somebody." When Valle left the store, Wilson approached him and drew a pistol. When Valle raised his hands in surrender and tried to run, Wilson shot him in the buttocks. He later threatened a witness who gave a statement to the police. The charges against Wilson did not go to trial when the authorities failed to locate Valle after he was discharged from the hospital. While in a juvenile detention center, he assaulted a youth worker.

In January 1993, Wilson and another boy attacked Daniel Rowe at school while he was drinking from a water fountain. They attacked him a second time later that day. On June 9, 1993, Wilson fatally shot a small dog for no apparent reason. On July 26, 1993, a man named Robert Loy Underwood bought cocaine from Wilson and another boy. As Underwood was driving away, Wilson fired five shots at him. One bullet hit Underwood in the head and the other went through his arm and lung, before stopping in his spine. Underwood survived, and later testified that Wilson then "turned around and just casually walked off." After initially claiming self-defense, Wilson admitted to shooting Underwood and served time in a juvenile detention center.

=== Robert Earl Butts Jr. ===
Butts was born in 1977. His parents separated due to his father's behavior; Butts' father was mentally ill and frequently in and out of mental institutions and prisons. His mother abused alcohol and crack cocaine and, by her own admission, was never involved in her son's life. During his youth, Butts dropped out of school and was arrested for burglary and shoplifting.

== Murder ==
On March 28, 1996, Wilson and Butts came across Parks, who was off-duty, outside a Walmart in Milledgeville, Georgia. Butts had worked with Parks at a local Burger King and asked if they could get a ride in his car. Parks agreed and took the two men in his car. Butts was sitting in the front passenger seat of the vehicle and Wilson was sitting in the back as they left the parking lot.

Parks was then fatally shot by one of the two men with a sawn-off shotgun. He was ordered out of his car and shot in the back of his head as he lay on the ground. His dead body was found lying face down on a residential street not far from the parking lot. Butts and Wilson fled in the stolen car, which they later burned after being unsuccessful in their attempt at finding someone to sell it to.

== Trials ==
Butts and Wilson were arrested four days after the murder, and each man accused the other of pulling the trigger. They were both gang members in the Folk Nation street gang. Prosecutors claimed they murdered Parks to achieve a higher status within their gang. Both men were convicted of murder. On November 7, 1997, Wilson was sentenced to death. On November 21, 1998, Butts was also sentenced to death. In December 1999, the Supreme Court of Georgia affirmed on direct appeal. Wilson next petitioned for a writ of habeas corpus in state court. The petition was denied in a written opinion by the state superior court, which was summarily affirmed by the state supreme court, and denied review by the U.S. Supreme Court.

Wilson then filed another petition for habeas corpus, now in the United States District Court for the Middle District of Georgia, which was denied. In December 2014, a unanimous panel of the United States Court of Appeals for the Eleventh Circuit affirmed, also rejecting Wilson's petition. In August 2016, the full en banc Eleventh Circuit again rejected the petition by a vote of 6–5.

In April 2018, the Supreme Court of the United States reversed and remanded by a vote of 6–3 in Wilson v. Sellers, finding that the Eleventh Circuit had erred under the Antiterrorism and Effective Death Penalty Act of 1996 by failing to consider the reasoning in lower, earlier, written state court decision. In August 2018, the Eleventh Circuit again denied Wilson's petition.

== Executions ==
Butts was executed by lethal injection on May 4, 2018, at the Georgia Diagnostic and Classification State Prison, 10 days before his 41st birthday. During his execution, he groaned and said, "It burns, man."

On May 28, 2019, Wilson's final petition for certiorari was denied by the Supreme Court of the United States. Eight days later, Wilson received an execution date of June 20, 2019. The Georgia State Board of Pardons and Paroles denied clemency for Wilson on the morning of his execution date. He requested a last meal of one medium thin-crust pizza with everything, 20 buffalo wings, one pint of butter pecan ice cream, some apple pie and grape juice. Wilson was executed by lethal injection on June 20, 2019. He became the 1,500th person to be executed in the United States since capital punishment was resumed in 1976 after Gregg v. Georgia. His execution was carried out at 9:52 p.m. ET at the Georgia Diagnostic and Classification State Prison in Butts County, Georgia after the U.S. Supreme Court denied a stay of execution.

Parks' family witnessed both executions. Prior to Wilson's execution, Parks' brother said, "Execution doesn't bring him back. But what execution does is it offers a starting point for myself, my dad, our family, to finally get some sort of closure and to start healing." Parks' brother named his daughter Corey in honor of his brother's memory.

== See also ==
- Capital punishment in Georgia (U.S. state)
- Capital punishment in the United States
- List of people executed in Georgia (U.S. state)
- List of people executed in the United States in 2018
- List of people executed in the United States in 2019

Executions carried out in Georgia
Preceded by Carlton Gary March 15, 2018	Robert Earl Butts; May 4, 2018	Succeeded by Scotty Morrow May 2, 2019
Executions carried out in the United States
Preceded by Erick Davila – Texas April 25, 2018	Robert Earl Butts – Georgia; May 4, 2018	Succeeded by Juan Castillo – Texas May 16, 2018
Executions carried out in Georgia
Preceded by Scotty Morrow May 2, 2019	Marion Wilson; June 20, 2019	Succeeded by Ray Cromartie November 13, 2019
Executions carried out in the United States
Preceded by Christopher Price – Alabama May 30, 2019	Marion Wilson – Georgia; June 20, 2019	Succeeded by Stephen Michael West – Tennessee August 15, 2019
