= Franklin and David Thomas =

Franklin and David Thomas (both died 13 February 1995) were convicted murderers who were executed by hanging in Saint Vincent and the Grenadines (SVG). Their executions, along with that of Douglas Hamlet, were the last executions performed by SVG to date, and caused controversy in the region due to questions about due process and the fairness of the execution without the opportunity to appeal.

== Background ==
Franklin and David Thomas were convicted of murder and received mandatory death sentences. After their appeal to SVG appeal courts failed, they were notified on Friday, 9 February 1995 that their executions would take place the following Monday morning. However, they still had a legal right to appeal to the Judicial Committee of the Privy Council (JCPC) in London, which is the supreme court for SVG.

On 13 February 1995, Saint Vincent and the Grenadines carried out a triple hanging, which was notable due to its short announcement time that prevented the brothers the opportunity to appeal. On that day the brothers Franklin and David Thomas, and Douglas Hamlet were executed.

=== Reaction and aftermath ===
The surprise nature of the triple hanging was a source of controversy in the country and the wider region. Amnesty International and other human rights organizations found out about the scheduled executions approximately 36 hours before they took place. After the executions were carried out, Amnesty International condemned the government's actions, citing "the secrecy and speed with which these executions have been carried out may have denied the prisoners justice."

After the triple execution in 1995, the government of SVG has had a defacto moratorium on executions, despite capital punishment remaining legal in the country. The topic of capital punishment remains a topic of debate in SVG. Prime Minister Ralph Gonsalves has spoken in favour of capital punishment, while recounting the unlikeliness this will occur, as "the Court of Appeal and the Privy Council decided practically that no one can be sent to the gallows anymore for murder".
