= Prisons in Pakistan =

List of jails

Prisons in Pakistan and their administration, is a Provincial competency under the Constitution of Pakistan. Pakistan has the 23rd largest prison population in the world and the 5th largest death row population. Around 64.5% of prisoners are awaiting trial prisoners. 98.6% of prisoners are male, 1.7% are juveniles and 1.2% of those held are foreign citizens. With a total inmate population of 102,026 distributed across 128 correctional facilities spanning the four provinces, Gilgit-Baltistan, and Azad Jammu and Kashmir, the country's prison system grapples with severe operational pressures, further exacerbated by the fact that over three-quarters of the prison population, 74,918 individuals, remain under trial.

== Types of prisons ==
The most common and standard jail institutions are Central Jails, District Jails and Sub Jails. The other types of jail establishments are Women Jails, Borstal Schools, and Special Jails.

Rehabilitation and diversion programs remain largely neglected, with no community service as an alternative sentence. Vulnerable groups, women, juveniles, and individuals with psychosocial disabilities, lack adequate protections. Meaningful reform demands the urgent enforcement of revised Prison Rules and alignment with global standards, including the Mandela, Bangkok, and Beijing Rules, to foster a just and humane penal system.

== List of Prisons ==
Pakistan's 128 prisons, designed for 65,811 inmates, remain severely overcrowded despite infrastructural expansions. Resource constraints and a punitive reliance on detention continue to define the system.

Pakistan has four dedicated women's prisons—three in Sindh (Karachi, Hyderabad, Sukkur) and one in Punjab (Multan), while most female inmates are housed in separate barracks within male prisons. Juvenile offenders are accommodated in five facilities, including Youth Offenders Industrial School and Borstal Institutes, with two in Punjab (Faisalabad, Bahawalpur) and three in Sindh (Karachi, Hyderabad, Sukkur).

Province	No of Prisons	Capacity
Balochistan	11	2173
Khyber Pakhtunkhwa	23	7982
Punjab	43	37217
Sindh	26	10285

=== Islamabad ===
- Islamabad Jail Complex, under construction

=== Balochistan ===
Prisons Department of Balochistan has following Jails:

Jails in Balochistan
Central Jail Mach
Central Jail Khuzdar
Central Jail Gadani
Central Jail Mastung
District Jail Quetta
District Jail Sibi
District Jail Kech
District Jail Loralai
District Jail Turbat
District Jail Dera Murad Jamali
District Jail Zhob

=== Gilgit Baltistan ===
Prisons in Gilgit Baltistan are under jurisdiction of Home and Prison Department.

Jails in Gilgit Baltistan
District Jail Gilgit
District Jail Ghizer
District Jail Skardu
District Jail Diamer
Gahkuch Jail

=== Azad Jammu and Kashmir ===
Prisons in Azad Jammu and Kashmir are under jurisdiction of AJK Prison Department.

Jails in Azad Jammu and Kashmir
Central Jail Mirpur
Central Jail Muzaffarabad
District Jail Bagh

=== Khyber Pakhtunkhwa ===
Khyber Pakhtukhwa Prisons inspectorate is an attached department of Home and Tribal Affairs Department. The Inspectorate of Prisons supervises the operation and management of 22 prisons and 5 internment centers.

Jails in Khyber Pakhtunkhwa
High Security Prison Mardan
Central Prison Peshawar
Central Prison Haripur
Central Prison Bannu
Central Prison DI Khan
District Jail Mansehra
District Jail Kohat
District Jail Timargara
District Jail Abbottabad
District Jail Chitral
District Jail Swat
Sub Jail Upper Dir
Sub Jail Dassu Kohistan
Sub Jail Battagram
Sub Jail Charsadda
Sub Jail Daggar
Sub Jail Chakdara
Sub Jail Karak
Sub Jail Lakki Marwat
Judicial Lockup Malakand
Judicial Lockup Nowshehra
Judicial Lockup Hangu
Judicial Lockup Swabi

=== Punjab ===
Serial No.	Name of Region	Name of Jail	Year of Construction
01.	Lahore Region	Central Jail Lahore (at Kot Lakhpat)	1965–1967
02.		Central Jail Gujranwala	1854
03.		Central Jail Sahiwal	1899
04.		District Jail Okara	2015
05.		District Jail Lahore	1930
06.		District Jail Sheikhupura	1921
07.		District Jail Kasur	1929
08.		District Jail Sialkot	1865
09.	Multan Region	New Central Jail Multan	1930
10.		New Central Jail Bahawalpur	1955
11.		Borstal Institution and Juvenile Jail Bahawalpur	1882
12.		Central Jail Dera Ghazi Khan	1913
13.		District Jail Multan	1872
14.		District Jail Rajanpur	1860
14-A.		District Jail Layyah	2015
15.		District Jail Vehari	2005-06
16.		Women Jail Multan	1973-74
17.		District Jail Rahim Yar Khan	1950
18.		District Jail Bahawalnagar	1947
19.		District Jail Muzaffar Garh	1908
20.	Rawalpindi Region	Central Jail Rawalpindi	1985–86
21.		District Jail Attock	1906
22.		District Jail Jhelum	1854
23.		District Jail Mandi Bahauddin	1978
24.		District Jail Gujrat	1930
25.		Sub Jail Chakwal	1998
26.	Faisalabad Region	Central Jail Faisalabad	1971
27.		Central Jail Mianwali	1903
28.		Borstal Institution and Juvenile Jail Faisalabad	2001
29.		District Jail Faisalabad	1873
30.		District Jail Jhang	1975
31.		District Jail Toba Tek Singh	2005-06
32.		District Jail Sargodha	1910
33.		District Jail Shahpur	1873
34.		District Jail Bhakkar	

=== Sindh ===
Karachi Region

1. Central Prison Karachi
2. District Prison Malir Karachi
3. Central Prison for Women Karachi

Hyderabad Region

1. Central Prison Hyderabad
2. Special Prison Nara Hyderabad
3. District Prison Badin
4. District Prison Mirpurkhas
5. District Prison Shaheed Benazirabad
6. District Prison Sanghar
7. District Prison Dadu
8. Open Prison Badin

Sukkur Region

1. Central Prison Sukkur
2. Central Prison Larkana
3. Central Prison Khairpur
4. District Prison Sukkur
5. District Prison Shikarpur
6. District Prison Naushahroferoze
7. District Prison Ghotki
8. District Prison Jacobabad
9. Special Prison for Women Larkana

== Training ==
=== Federal ===
The National Academy for Prisons Administration is the Federal Government's department for setting the standards of prison staff and is in charge of the training for all the prison staff in every provinces of Pakistan. It operates under Ministry of Interior. The academy is based in Lahore.

=== Sindh ===
Government of Sindh runs a training institute at Sindh Prisons Staff Training Institute Nara Hyderabad.

=== Punjab ===
Government of Punjab runs Punjab Prisons Staff Training Institute in Lahore.

== See also ==
Prison officers ranks:

- Inspector General of Prisons
- Deputy Inspector General of Prisons
- Assistant Inspector General of Prisons
- Superintendent of Jail

Related:

- Crime in Pakistan
- Law enforcement in Pakistan

List:

- List of prisons in Pakistan
