= New Central Jail Bahawalpur =

Prison in Bahawalpur, Pakistan

- Location: Bahawalpur, Pakistan
- Status: Operational
- Security class: Maximum
- Population: (3 February 2010)
- Opened: 1955
- Managed by: Government of the Punjab, Home Department
- Director: Shahram Tauqir Khan, Senior Superintendent of Jail

Notable prisoners
- Sheikh Rashid Ahmed

New Central Jail Bahawalpur is a jail in Bahawalpur, Pakistan located on Jail Road nearly one kilometer toward east of the Radio Pakistan Bahawalpur. In September 2006, four members of the same family, including one father, his two sons and one brother, were hanged to death in this jail. The jail has been declared as Model Jail by the Government of the Punjab, Home Department in the year 2010.

== History ==
The jail was built in 1955 when the Old Central Jail Bahawalpur was declared as Borstal Institution & Juvenile Jail. It was constructed with a view to confine long-term and life prisoners of Bahawalpur Division.

== Prison industries ==
Following prison industries are functioning in the jail to train the convicted prisoners in various trades and handicrafts so that they could earn their living after release form Jail, utilise prison labour in profitable works for benefit of state exchequer, and to keep the prisoners busy in useful tasks.

- Prisoner Durree Weaving Unit
- Carpet Knitting Unit
- Niwar Knitting Unit
- School and Office Furniture Manufacturing Unit

The school and office furniture manufactured at the Jail is supplied to all educational institutions in the districts of Bahawalpur, Bahawalnagar, Lodhran and Rahim Yar Khan.

== See also ==
- Government of Punjab, Pakistan
- Punjab Prisons (Pakistan)
- Central Jail Faisalabad
- Central Jail Lahore
- Central Jail Mianwali
- Prison Officer
- Headquarter Jail
- Central Jail Rawalpindi
- District Jail Rawalpindi
- District Jail Jhelum
- National Academy for Prisons Administration
