= Punjab Prisons (Pakistan) =

Pakistani correctional organization

Punjab Prisons پنجاب جيل خانہ جات

Agency overview
- Formed: 1854
- Employees: 25,000

Jurisdictional structure
- Operations jurisdiction: Punjab, Pakistan
- Map of Punjab Prisons's jurisdiction
- Population: 64,519 inmates
- Legal jurisdiction: Punjab
- Primary governing body: Government of Punjab, Pakistan
- Secondary governing body: Home Department

Operational structure
- Headquarters: Lahore, Punjab
- Agency executive: Mian Salik Jalal, Inspector General of Prisons, Punjab

Facilities
- Lockups: 43 Jails

Website
- www.prisons.punjab.gov.pk

The Punjab Prisons is a correctional organization, a uniformed service and an attached department of the provincial Home Department in Punjab, Pakistan. The organization works under administrative control of the Additional Chief Secretary Home to Government of the Punjab, Pakistan. Functional head of the organization is Inspector General of Prisons who manages 69 prisons in the province. The organization is responsible for custody, control, care and correction (4 Cs) of prisoners confined in various central, district and special jails in the province of Punjab, Pakistan).

== History ==
The Punjab Prisons Department was established in 1854 for custody, control, care and correction (4 Cs) of prisoners confined in various central, district and special jails in the province of Punjab and Dr. C. Hathaway was appointed as first Inspector General (IG). The Prisons Act of 1894 (Act No.IX of 1894) was passed by the Governor-General of India in Council which received the assent of the Governor General on 22 March 1894. The District Jail Sialkot (Since 1865), District Jail Shahpur District Sargodha (Since 1873), District Jail Jhelum (Since 1854), District Jail Rajanpur (Since 1860), Borstal Institution & Juvenile Jail Bahawalpur (Since 1882), District Jail Multan (Since 1872), District Jail Faisalabad (Since 1873) and Central Jail Gujranwala (Since 1854) in Punjab province and District Jail (now Juvenile Jail) Dadu (Since 1774) in Sindh province were even functional long before passing of the Prisons Act in 1894. At the time of independence, the Punjab inherited nineteen jails whereas Twenty-one more jails have so far been commissioned in the province after independence. Presently there are Forty Jails functional in the Province including One High Security Prison, Nine Central Jails, Twenty-five District Jails, Two Borstal Institutions & Juvenile Jails, One Women Jail and Two Sub Jails.

== Legal framework ==
The management and superintendence of prisons and all other matters relating to the prisoners are generally regulated under the following laws / rules:

Acts (1894 to 2006)

- The Prisons Act, 1894
- The Prisoners' Act, 1900
- Lunacy Act, 1912
- The Punjab Borstal Act, 1926
- Good Conduct Prisoners Probation Release Act, 1926
- Punjab Employees Efficiency, Discipline and Accountability Act, (PEEDA) 2006

Rules and Regulations (1818 to 2010)

- Regulation III of 1818 (A Regulation for the Confinement of State Prisoners)
- Good Conduct Prisoner's Probation Release Rules, 1927
- West Pakistan Prisons Department Delegation of Power Rules, 1962
- The Pakistan Prisons Rules, 1978
- The Punjab Execution of the Punishment of Whipping Rules, 1979
- Juvenile Justice System Rules, 2001
- Punjab Juvenile Justice System Rules, 2002
- Punjab Prisons Department Service Rules, 2010
- Parole System in Pakistan

Ordinances

- Probation of Offenders Ordinance (XLV of 1960)
- West Pakistan Maintenance of Public Order Ordinance (XXXI of 1960)
- Execution of the Punishment of Whipping Ordinance (IX of 1979)
- Juvenile Justice System Ordinance (XXII of 2000)
- Mental Health Ordinance 2001

Other relevant laws Besides above statutes, the following laws are relevant to the administration of prisons, prisoners and jail staffers.

- Pakistan Penal Code.
- Criminal Procedure Code.
- Civil Procedure Code.
- Punjab Removal from Service Ordinance, 2000.
- Punjab Employees Efficiency Discipline and Accountability Act, 2006.
- Punjab Civil Service Rules, 1974.
- West Pakistan Prisons Department Delegation of Power Rules, 1962.
- Punjab Prisons Department Executive Staff Punishment and Appeal Rules, 1981 (promulgated on 8 January 1981).
- Punjab Prisons Department Service Rules, 2010.

== Inspector Generals of Prisons,Punjab ==
Following table shows the up-to-date names and tenure of posting of Inspector General of Prisons, Punjab, Pakistan.

Serial No.	Name of Incumbent	From	To
01.	Dr. C. Hathaway	1854	1863
02.	Dr. A. M. Dalla	1864	1884
03.	Brig. R. Grey	1884	1891
04.	Col. T. E. L. Bate	1891	1905
05.	Lt. Col. R. T. Macnamara	1905	1906
06.	Lt. Col. G. F .W. Braide	1906	1915
07.	Maj. T. W. Finlayson	1915	1920
08.	Lt. Col. F. I. Ward	1920	1927
09.	Lt. Col. F. A. Barker	1927	1939
10.	Lt. Col. N. D. Puri	1939	1946
11.	Lt. Col. G. K . Khan	1946	1947
12.	Lt. Col. H. H. Mehmood	1947	1948
13.	Lt. Col. B. H. Syed	1948	1958
14.	Sheikh Ikram Ali	1958	1960
15.	Rana Jahandad Khan	1960	1962
	Post Abolished	21 February 1962	17 May 1971
16.	Brig. Zahoor-Ul-Haq Malik	17 May 1971	9 April 1972
17.	Raja Muhammad Arshad, P.S.P	10 April 1972	18 July 1974
18.	Muhammad Ibrahim Khan Tareen	19 July 1974	30 March 1976
19.	Ch. Nazeer Ahmed Akhtar	1 April 1976	16 December 1979
20.	Sheikh Ehsan Ghani	17 December 1979	31 May 1981
21.	Shafqat Ullah Shah	31 May 1981	30 May 1983
22.	Mian Shaukat Mehmood	1 June 1983	7 May 1988
23.	Ch. Naseer Ahmed	8 May 1988	18 March 1989
24.	Hafiz Muhammad Qasim Khan	19 March 1989	21 August 1993
25.	Jahangir Mirza, P.S.P	21 August 1993	1 January 1994
26.	Ch. Muhammad Hussain Cheema	1 January 1994	11 April 1997
27.	Jahangir Mirza, P.S.P	11 April 1997	29 December 1997
28.	Maj. (Retd) Zia-Ul-Hasssan Khan, P.S.P	30 December 1997	6 July 2000
29.	Brig. Tauqeer Qamar	6 July 2000	26 October 2001
30.	Ch. Muhammad Hassain Cheema	26 October 2001	31 July 2002
31.	Pervaiz Rahim Rajput	15 August 2002	29 May 2004
32.	Khawaja Khalid Farooq, Q.P.M, P.S.P	29 May 2004	29 October 2004
33.	Salahuddin Ahmed Khan Niazi	29 October 2004	18 June 2005
34.	Capt. (Retd) Sarfraz Ahmed Mufti	18 June 2005	23 April 2008
35.	Mian Farooq Nazeer	20 May 2008	2 March 2009
36.	KoKab Nadeem Warriach	2 March 2009	30 December 2011
37.	Mian Farooq Nazeer	30 December 2011	27 October 2017
38.	Mirza Shahid Saleem Baig	27 October 2017	22 October 2022
39.	Mian Salik Jalal (Additional Charge)	22 October 2022	28 October 2022
39.	Malik Mubashar Ahmed Khan	28 October 2022	03 March 2023
40.	Mian Farooq Nazeer (Tamagha E Imtiaz) (BPS-22)	03 March 2023	15 June 2026
41.	Mian Salik Jalal	16 June 2026	

== DIGs of Prisons ==
Following table shows the names, district of domicile, dates of birth, dates of joining, BPS, present postings and dates of superannuation of the serving DIGs in the Punjab Prisons (Pakistan).

Serial No.	Name	District of domicile	Date of birth	Date of joining	BPS	Present posting	Date of superannuation
01.	Kokab Nadeem	Gujrat	18 April 1968	9 October 1994	20	Member, Chief Minister's Inspection (CMIT), Government of the Punjab, Lahore	17 April 2028
02.	Mubashar Ahmed Khan	Kasur	20 November 1970	22 July 2000	20	Member (Inquiries),Services & General Administration Department (S&GAD), Government of Punjab,Lahore	19 November 2030
03.	Abdul Rauf Rana	Lahore	1 January 1973	22 July 2000	20	Deputy Inspector General of Prisons Rawalpindi Region	31 December 2032
04.	Muhammad Shaukat Feroze	Bhakkar	1 October 1972	22 July 2000	20	Deputy Inspector General of Prisons Headquarters Lahore OR Commandant Punjab Prison Staff Training College, Sahiwal (Additional Charge)	30 September 2032
05.	Muhammad Aslam	Muzaffargarh	15 March 1967	22 July 2000	20	Deputy Inspector General of Prisons Bahawalpur Region	14 March 2027
06.	Naveed Rauf	Jhelum	14 December 1977	9 August 2003	20	Deputy Inspector General of Prisons, Inspections	13 December 2037
07.	Kamran Anjum	Okara	8 June 1977	22 May 2004	20	Deputy Inspector General of Prisons, Sahiwal Region	7 June 2037
08.	Mohsin Rafique	Sahiwal	27 September 1976	10 November 2004	20	Deputy Inspector General of Prisons, Lahore Region	29 September 2036

== DIG Prisons (OPS)/Under Section 9 of PCS Act,1974 ==
Following table shows the names, district of domicile, dates of birth, dates of joining, BPS, present postings and dates of superannuation of the serving DIG Prisons (OPS)/under section 9 of the Punjab Civil Servants act,1974 in Punjab Prisons (Pakistan).

Serial No.	Name	District of domicile	Date of birth	Date of joining	BPS	Present posting	Date of superannuation
01.	Saeedullah Gondal	Mandi Bahauddin	16 November 1974	8 November 2004	19	Deputy Inspector General of Prisons, Sargodha Region	15 November 2034
02.	Rana Razaullah Khan	Faisalabad	1 March 1971	19 July 2000	19	Deputy Inspector General of Prisons Faisalabad Region	28 February 2031
03.	Ahmed Naveed Gondal	Mandi Bahauddin	1 February 1978	19 July 2007	19	Deputy Inspector General of Prisons Multan Region and Dera Ghazi Khan Region	28 February 2038
04.	Asad Javed Warriach	Gujranwala	1 April 1981	12 September 2007	19	Deputy Inspector General of Prisons Gujranwala Region	31 March 2041

== AIG Prisons/Superintendents of Jails ==
Following table shows the names, district of domicile, dates of birth, dates of joining, BPS, present postings and dates of superannuation of the serving Superintendents of Jails in Punjab Prisons (Pakistan)according to the seniority list

Serial No.	Name	District of domicile	Date of birth	Date of joining	BPS	Present posting	Date of superannuation
01.	Imtiaz Ahmed	Sialkot	18 April 1976	12 September 2007	19	AIG (Establishment),Inspectorate of Prisons Punjab,Lahore	17 April 2036
02.	Sharam Tauqeer	Faisalabad	4 June 1978	12 September 2007	19	Senior Superintendent of Jail, New Central Jail Bahawalpur	3 June 2038
03.	Sajid Baig	Faisalabad	22 January 1977	12 September 2007	19	Senior Superintendent of Jail, Central Jail Rawalpindi	21 January 2037
04.	Muhammad Asif Azeem	Sahiwal	29 April 1981	12 September 2007	18	Superintendent of Jail, Borstal Institution and Juvenile Jail Faisalabad u/s 9 of PCS Act,1974	28 April 2041
05.	Saqib Nazeer	Kasur	12 August 1979	12 September 2007	19	Assistant Commandant (Male) Punjab Prison Staff Training College, Sahiwal	11 August 2039
06.	Jam Asif Iqbal	Muzaffargarh	5 April 1976	12 September 2007	19	Senior Superintendent of Jail, High Security Prison Mianwali	4 April 2036
07.	Naveed Ashraf	Faisalabad	5 December 1976	20 July 2000	19	Superintendent of Jail,Inspectorate of Prisons Punjab Lahore	14 December 2036
08.	Ejaz Asghar	Sheikhupura	15 March 1974	20 July 2000	19	Senior Superintendent of Jail, Central Jail Lahore	14 March 2034
09.	Mansoor Akbar	Bahawalpur	8 September 1972	20 July 2000	18	Senior Superintendent of Jail, Borstal Institution and Juvenile Jail Bahawalpur u/s 9 of PCS Act,1974	7 September 2032
10.	Asghar Ali	Lahore	27 September 1975	19 January 1998	19	Superintendent of Jail, New Central Jail Multan	26 September 2035
11.	Babar Ali	Multan	21 April 1970	17 July 2003	18	Superintendent of Jail, Inspectorate of Prisons Punjab Lahore (Under Suspension)	20 April 2030
12.	Noor Hassan	Toba Tek Singh	8 January 1970	24 August 1995	18	Senior Superintendent of Jail, Inspectorate of Prisons Punjab,Lahore	07 January 2030
13.	Abdul Ghafoor Anjum	Kasur	2 May 1976	11 November 2004	19	Senior Superintendent of Jail, Central Jail Faisalabad	1 May 2036
14.	Muhammad Ansar	Faisalabad	2 June 1974	15 January 2003	19	AIG (Security and Discipline),Inspectorate of Prisons Punjab,Lahore	1 June 2034
15.	Muhammad Zubair	Gujranwala	10 May 1969	12 November 2004	19	Senior Superintendent of Jail, Central Jail Sahiwal	9 May 2029
16.	Arshad Ali Warriach	Layyah	9 March 1977	6 November 2004	18	Superintendent of Jail, Inspectorate of Prisons Punjab,Lahore	8 March 2037
17.	Ishtiaq Ahmed	Gujranwala	1 January 1971	8 November 2004	18	Superintendent of Jail, Inspectorate of Prisons Punjab,Lahore	31 December 2030
18.	Javaid Iqbal	Vehari	18 January 1978	18 November 2004	18	Superintendent of Jail, District Jail Rahim Yar Khan	17 January 2038
19.	Mian Abdul Saboor Sukhera	Pakpattan	11 April 1968	11 August 1989	17	Superintendent of Jail, Sub Jail Chakwal u/s 9 of PCS Act,1974	10 April 2028
20.	Tipu Sultan	Lahore	01 January 1967	18 August 1990	18	Superintendent of Jail, Additional Superintendent Central Jail Lahore	31 December 2026
21.	Malik Liaquat Ali	Lahore	10 February 1968	03 December 1990	18	Senior Superintendent of Jail, High Security Prison, Sahiwal u/s 9 of PCS Act 1974	09 February 2028
22.	Muhammed Arshad	Sialkot	10 February 1967	04 May 1993	18	Superintendent of Jail District Jail Layyah	09 February 2027
23.	Rasool Bukhsh	Bahawalpur	10 November 1968	05 May 1993	18	Superintendent of Jail Inspectorate of Prisons Punjab Lahore (Under Suspension)	13 November 2028
24.	Akhtar Iqbal	Sheikhupura	01 January 1970	05 May 1993	18	Superintendent of Jail District Jail Kasur	31 December 2029
25.	Muhammed Mudassar	Gujranwala	21 June 1969	28 July 1994	18	Superintendent of Jail, District Jail Hafizabad	20 June 2029
26.	Farrukh Rasheed	Narowal	01 October 1969	23 August 1995	18	Superintendent of Jail, Central Jail, Dera Ghazi Khan u/s 9 of PCS Act,1974	30 August 2029
27.	Nazik Shahzad	Dera Ghazi Khan	01 January 1975	06 January 1998	18	Superintendent of Jail, District Jail Muzaffargarh	31 December 2034
28.	Irfan Suleman	Faisalabad	01 October 1973	06 January 1998	18	Superintendent of Jail, District Jail Toba Tek Singh	30 September 2033
29.	Dr.Muhammed Siddique Gill	Jhang	13 October 1972	06 January 1998	18	Superintendent of Jail, Central Jail Mianwali	12 October 2032
30.	Zaheer Ahmed Virk	Sheikhupura	18 April 1973	06 January 1998	18	Superintendent of Jail District Jail Lahore	17 April 2033
31.	Hassan Mujtaba Rizvi	Gujrat	25 November 1973	01 October 1997	18	Superintendent of Jail, District Jail Bahawalnagar	24 November 2033
32.	Ali Akbar	Sahiwal	15 May 1973	03 July 1998	18	Superintendent of Jail, Inspectorate of Prisons Punjab,Lahore	14 May 2034
33.	Wajahat Ali Khan	Faisalabad	26 June 1969	10 December 1998	18	Superintendent of Jail, Sub Jail Pindi Bhattian	21 June 2029
34.	Babar Ali	Sialkot	24 March 1968	20 August 1995	18	Superintendent of Jail, District Jail Narowal	23 March 2028
35.	Aftab Ahmed	Sargodha	16 April 1987	28 May 2015	18	Superintendent of Jail, District Jail Vehari	15 April 2047
36.	Hassan Nawaz	Sahiwal	02 December 1985	28 May 2015	18	Superintendent of Jail, District Jail Pakpattan	01 December 2045
37.	Muhammed Umair	Lahore	01 January 1989	28 May 2015	18	Superintendent of Jail, District Jail Sheikhupura	31 December 2048
38.	Usama Salamat	Hafizabad	26 September 1989	28 May 2015	18	Superintendent of Jail, District Jail Jhang	25 September 2048
39.	Muhammed Ali	Bahawalpur	15 December 1985	28 May 2015	18	Senior Research and Development Officer (Male) Punjab Prison Staff Training College, Sahiwal	14 December 2045
40.	Kashif Ali	Sialkot	10 March 1987	28 May 2015	18	Superintendent of Jail, District Jail Attock	09 March 2047
41.	Karman Haider	Sargodha	22 May 1988	02 September 2015	18	Superintendent of Jail, District Jail Gujrat	21 May 2048
42.	Abdullah Abu Bakar	Pakpattan	20 April 1990	18 August 2015	18	Superintendent of Jail, Central Jail Gujranwala u/s 9 of PCS Act 1974	19 April 2050
43.	Muhammad Kashaf	Lahore	24 April 1988	18 August 2015	18	Superintendent of Jail, District Jail Shahpur	23 April 2048
44.	Ghulam Sarwar	Sialkot	13 September 1971	20 August 1995	18	Superintendent of Jail, District Jail Jhelum	12 September 2031
45.	Ali Ameer Shah	Khushab	11 November 1976	04 January 2003	18	Superintendent of Jail,Additional Superintendent Central Jail Rawalpindi	10 November 2036
46.	Muhammad Akram	Faisalabad	06 March 1975	10 April 2004	18	Superintendent of Jail,Additional Superintendent,Central Jail Faisalabad	05 March 2035
47.	Muhammad Jahangir	Kasur	15 November 1974	10 April 2004	17	Superintendent of Jail, District Jail Okara u/s 9 of PCS Act,1974	14 November 2034
48.	Ammar Ahmed	Sargodha	15 November 1976	10 April 2004	18	Superintendent of Jail, District Jail Multan	14 November 2036
49.	Haq Nawaz	Mandi Bahauddin	04 April 1977	10 April 2004	18	Superintendent of Jail, District Jail Mandi Bahauddin	03 April 2037
50.	Muhammad Azhar Javed	Sargodha	01 April 1981	04 February 2002	18	Superintendent of Jail Inspectorate of Prisons Punjab Lahore (Under Suspension)	31 March 1941
51.	Suhail Nabi Gill	Faisalabad	11 January 1972	04 February 2002	18	Superintendent of Jail, District Jail Lodhran	10 January 2032
52.	Imtiaz Abbas	Jhang	01 April 1980	24 December 2004	17	Superintendent of Jail, Inspectorate of Prisons Punjab,Lahore u/s 9 of PCS Act,1974	31 April 2040
53.	Arif Shahzad	Mianwali	01 May 1977	24 December 2004	17	Superintendent of Jail, District Jail Bhakhar u/s 9 of PCS Act,1974	31 April 2037
54.	Imran Naveed Ashraf	Sargodha	12 April 1982	24 December 2004	17	Superintendent of Jail,Inspectorate of Prisons Punjab Lahore (Under Suspension)	11 April 2042
55.	Kashif Rasool	Kasur	01 October 1979	24 December 2004	17	Superintendent of Jail District Jail Khanewal u/s 9 of the PCS Act,1974	30 September 2039
56.	Ghulam Mohyudin	Rahim Yar Khan	21 April 1976	24 December 2004	17	Superintendent of Jail Sub Jail Shujabad u/s 9 of the PCS Act,1974	20 April 2036

== Uniforms ==
Before 1981, the prison officers in all provinces of Pakistan used to wear khaki colour uniforms as worn by the Pakistan Army. During the regime of Chief Martial Law Administrator, General Muhammad Zia-ul-Haq, some army officers objected to the wearing of army-type uniforms by the officials of Forest Department, Prisons Department, Karachi Port Trust, Sea Customs, Land Customs, Excise & Taxation, Pakistan International Airlines (PIA), Police Qaumi Razakars, Airport Security Force (ASF), Merchant Navy /Marine Academy, Sergent and Deputy Sergent-at-Arms of the National Assembly and Senate Secretariats, Boy Scouts and Girl Guides in Pakistan. It was suggested that the police type uniforms should be prescribed for the officers and men of the Prisons Department. Thus, a meeting was held in the Federal Ministry of Interior, Islamabad, and the pattern of uniform for prison officials was changed from military to that of police. Following specific orders were passed by Government of Pakistan, Ministry of Interior in respect of Prisons Department:

PRISONS DEPARTMENT
"Instead of khaki shirts of the pattern worn by the Army, Officers and men of the Prisons Department should wear mazri shirts. The khaki cap should be changed to blue cap as worn by the Police. The wreath on the cap of I.G. Prisons should be allowed but it should be of silver and not golden colour. Badges of rank should be as worn by the DIG Police, and in case of the Deputy Superintendent of Jail and others, badges should be comparable to equivalent ranks of the Police."

It is worth-mentioning that the post of IG Prisons had been a BPS-20 post in 1981 i.e. equivalent to the post of DIG Police (BPS-20). Accordingly, Government of Pakistan, Ministry of Interior had directed that the badges of rank of the IG Prisons should be as worn by the DIG Police.

== Up-gradation of pay scales, sanction of uniform allowance, badges of ranks, etc. ==
On 2 May 2009, Chief Justice of Pakistan, Mr. Justice Iftikhar Muhammad Chaudhry visited Central Jail Lahore. On 21 September 2009, on the eve of Eid-ul-Fitr, the Chief Justice visited Central Jail Rawalpindi. Besides passing various orders respecting management of prisons and prisoners during the said visits of jails, he issued verbal directions to the concerned authorities of Punjab Government for upgrading the pay scales of the prison officers in the Punjab and for doubling of their pay. Later, Khawaja Muhammad Sharif, Chief Justice, Lahore High Court, Lahore took suo moto notice of the case and issued directions to the provincial Government for the upgrading of posts of incumbents of the prisons department to make them at par with the equivalent ranks of Police. On 26 September 2009, Government of the Punjab, Home Department, Lahore issued notification through which the Pay Scales of Prison Officers in Punjab were made equivalent to the Punjab Police for all ranks and Uniform Allowance was also sanctioned for IG Prisons, DIG Prisons, and other ranks of the Punjab Prisons. After such up-gradation, officers of the Prisons Department in Punjab started wearing uniforms equivalent to their counterparts in the Police Department, in accordance with the spirit of the Government of Pakistan, Ministry of Interior's letter No.4/2/78-Public dated 28 July 1981, Government of the Punjab, Home Department, Lahore's letter No.PRS-I(6)7/76-Vol-III dated 10 August 1981 addressed to the Inspector General of Prisons, Punjab, Lahore, Syed Shafqat Ullah Shah, Inspector General of Prisons, Punjab, Lahore's letter No.EB/U.2.I/29847-74 dated 19 August 1981 captioned "UNIFORM" addressed to the Superintendents of all jails in the Punjab as well as Pakistan Prison Rules 1978, Chapter No.48 - Uniforms, pending such specific notification by the provincial government. Inspector General of Prisons, Punjab has moved a summary to Chief Minister Punjab through Additional Chief Secretary (Home) for replacement of the existing Rule 1204 in accordance with the table below, and repealing the Rules 1205 and 1206 of Pakistan Prison Rules 1978.

Serial No.	1	2	3	4	5	6	7
Rank	IG Prisons /Commandant Punjab Prisons Staff Training College (PPSTC), Sahiwal	DIG Prisons /Deputy Commandant Punjab Prisons Staff Training College (PPSTC), Sahiwal	AIG Prisons/ Senior Superintendent of Central / Borstal Institution & Juvenile Jail	AIG Prisons/ Superintendent of Central / Borstal Institution & Juvenile Jail (with at least 12 years' prison service in BPS-17 and above and course qualified for promotion to BPS-19)	Superintendent of District Jail / Additional Superintendent of Central Jail / Principal Punjab Prison Staff Training Institute	Deputy Superintendent of Jail	Assistant Superintendent of Jail
BPS	21	20	19	18	18	17	16
Jacket	Grey drill serge or Grey Bush Jacket /Service Dress (SD) Jacket, fabric suiting the climatic conditions, Sam Browne or removable waist belt with buckle, buttoned cuffs, turned down collars, medium prison-pattern buttons down the front, four front pockets with plain flaps to buttons, shoulder straps plain fastening at top with a small prison-pattern button, Shoulder Ranks, Gorget Patches of pattern approved for substantive rank /pay-scale, name plate, national flag, medals or medal ribbons, as the case may be.	Grey drill serge or Grey Bush Jacket /Service Dress (SD) Jacket, fabric suiting the climatic conditions, Sam Browne or removable waist belt with buckle, buttoned cuffs, turned down collars, medium prison-pattern buttons down the front, four front pockets with plain flaps to buttons, shoulder straps plain fastening at top with a small prison-pattern button, Shoulder Ranks, Gorget Patches of pattern approved for substantive rank /pay-scale, name plate, national flag, medals or medal ribbons, as the case may be.	Grey drill serge or Grey Bush Jacket /Service Dress (SD) Jacket, fabric suiting the climatic conditions, Sam Browne or removable waist belt with buckle, buttoned cuffs, turned down collars, medium prison-pattern buttons down the front, four front pockets with plain flaps to buttons, shoulder straps plain fastening at top with a small prison-pattern button, Shoulder Ranks, Gorget Patches of pattern approved for substantive rank /pay-scale, name plate, national flag, medals or medal ribbons, as the case may be.	Grey drill serge or Grey Bush Jacket /Service Dress (SD) Jacket, fabric suiting the climatic conditions, Sam Browne or removable waist belt with buckle, buttoned cuffs, turned down collars, medium prison-pattern buttons down the front, four front pockets with plain flaps to buttons, shoulder straps plain fastening at top with a small prison-pattern button, Shoulder Ranks, Shoulder Letters "PRISONS", name plate, national flag, medals or medal ribbons, as the case may be.	Grey drill serge or Grey Bush Jacket /Service Dress (SD) Jacket, fabric suiting the climatic conditions, Sam Browne or removable waist belt with buckle, buttoned cuffs, turned down collars, medium prison-pattern buttons down the front, four front pockets with plain flaps to buttons, shoulder straps plain fastening at top with a small prison-pattern button, Shoulder Ranks, Shoulder Letters "PRISONS", name plate, national flag, medals or medal ribbons, as the case may be.	Grey drill serge or Grey Bush Jacket /Service Dress (SD) Jacket, fabric suiting the climatic conditions, Sam Browne or removable waist belt with buckle, buttoned cuffs, turned down collars, medium prison-pattern buttons down the front, four front pockets with plain flaps to buttons, shoulder straps plain fastening at top with a small prison-pattern button, Shoulder Ranks, Shoulder Letters "PRISONS", name plate, national flag, medals or medal ribbons, as the case may be.	Grey drill serge or Grey Bush Jacket /Service Dress (SD) Jacket, fabric suiting the climatic conditions, Sam Browne or removable waist belt with buckle, buttoned cuffs, turned down collars, medium prison-pattern buttons down the front, four front pockets with plain flaps to buttons, shoulder straps plain fastening at top with a small prison-pattern button, Shoulder Ranks, Shoulder Letters "PRISONS", name plate, national flag, medals or medal ribbons, as the case may be.
Raincoat	Navy Blue, long below knees, hooded, water-proof fabric, four front pockets, "PUNJAB PRISONS" inscription on the front left pocket and middle of upper back.	Navy Blue, long below knees, hooded, water-proof fabric, four front pockets, "PUNJAB PRISONS" inscription on the front left pocket and middle of upper back.	Navy Blue, long below knees, hooded, water-proof fabric, four front pockets, "PUNJAB PRISONS" inscription on the front left pocket and middle of upper back.	Navy Blue, long below knees, hooded, water-proof fabric, four front pockets, "PUNJAB PRISONS" inscription on the front left pocket and middle of upper back.	Navy Blue, long below knees, hooded, water-proof fabric, four front pockets, "PUNJAB PRISONS" inscription on the front left pocket and middle of upper back.	Navy Blue, long below knees, hooded, water-proof fabric, four front pockets, "PUNJAB PRISONS" inscription on the front left pocket and middle of upper back.	Navy Blue, long below knees, hooded, water-proof fabric, four front pockets, "PUNJAB PRISONS" inscription on the front left pocket and middle of upper back.
Jersey	Grey, woolen, full sleeves, V-Neck, two breast pockets with plain flaps to buttons, shoulder straps, police /military pattern	Grey, woolen, full sleeves, V-Neck, two breast pockets with plain flaps to buttons, shoulder straps, police /military pattern	Grey, woolen, full sleeves, V-Neck, two breast pockets with plain flaps to buttons, shoulder straps, police /military pattern	Grey, woolen, full sleeves, V-Neck, two breast pockets with plain flaps to buttons, shoulder straps, police /military pattern	Grey, woolen, full sleeves, V-Neck, two breast pockets with plain flaps to buttons, shoulder straps, police /military pattern	Grey, woolen, full sleeves, V-Neck, two breast pockets with plain flaps to buttons, shoulder straps, police /military pattern	Grey, woolen, full sleeves, V-Neck, two breast pockets with plain flaps to buttons, shoulder straps, police /military pattern
Cap	Navy Blue Beret, Black Woolen Roll-Over Winter Cap, Navy Blue Polo Cap or Navy Blue Peaked Cap with blue band around, police /military pattern, with cap badge	Navy Blue Beret, Black Woolen Roll-Over Winter Cap, Navy Blue Polo Cap or Navy Blue Peaked Cap with blue band around, police /military pattern, with cap badge	Navy Blue Beret, Black Woolen Roll-Over Winter Cap, Navy Blue Polo Cap or Navy Blue Peaked Cap with blue band around, police /military pattern, with cap badge	Navy Blue Beret, Black Woolen Roll-Over Winter Cap, Navy Blue Polo Cap or Navy Blue Peaked Cap with blue band around, police /military pattern, with cap badge	Navy Blue Beret, Black Woolen Roll-Over Winter Cap, Navy Blue Polo Cap or Navy Blue Peaked Cap with blue band around, police /military pattern, with cap badge	Navy Blue Beret, Black Woolen Roll-Over Winter Cap, Navy Blue Polo Cap or Navy Blue Peaked Cap with blue band around, police /military pattern, with cap badge	Navy Blue Beret, Black Woolen Roll-Over Winter Cap, Navy Blue Polo Cap or Navy Blue Peaked Cap with blue band around, police /military pattern, with cap badge
Cap Badge	Silver colour, embroidered, national emblem on the top, floral circlet, crossing sword and baton inside as prescribed for Major-General of the Pakistan Army / Additional IG Police in Pakistan	Silver colour, embroidered, floral circlet crescent containing a five-corner star inside as prescribed for Brigadier of the Pakistan Army / DIG Police in Pakistan	Silver colour, embroidered, floral circlet crescent containing a five-corner star inside as prescribed for Colonel of the Pakistan Army / SSP (BPS-19) in Pakistan	Silver colour, embroidered, national emblem on the top, floral circlet with inscription "PRISONS" inside	Silver colour, embroidered, national emblem on the top, floral circlet with inscription "PRISONS" inside	Silver colour, embroidered, national emblem on the top, floral circlet with inscription "PRISONS" inside	Silver colour, embroidered, national emblem on the top, floral circlet with inscription "PRISONS" inside
Wreath on Peaked Cap or Polo Cap	Floral embroidered silver-colour wreath on the visor as prescribed for Major-General of the Pakistan Army / Additional IG Police in Pakistan	Floral embroidered silver-colour wreath on the visor as prescribed for Brigadier of the Pakistan Army / DIG Police in Pakistan	Floral embroidered silver-colour wreath on the visor as prescribed for Colonel of the Pakistan Army / SSP (BPS-19) in Pakistan	Floral embroidered silver-colour wreath on the visor as prescribed for Lieutenant Colonel of the Pakistan Army / Superintendent of Police (BPS-18) in Pakistan with 12 years or more service and course qualified for promotion to BPS-19	Floral embroidered silver-colour wreath on the visor as prescribed for Major of the Pakistan Army / Superintendent of Police (BPS-18) in Pakistan with less than 12 years of service	Floral embroidered silver-colour wreath on the visor as prescribed for Captain of the Pakistan Army / Deputy Superintendent of Police in Pakistan	Not Authorised
Shirt (Men)	Cotton, blackish grey Mazri cloth shirt, two front pockets on both breasts with plain flaps to buttons, five buttons down the front, shoulder straps, police / military pattern.	Cotton, blackish grey Mazri cloth shirt, two front pockets on both breasts with plain flaps to buttons, five buttons down the front, shoulder straps, police / military pattern.	Cotton, blackish grey Mazri cloth shirt, two front pockets on both breasts with plain flaps to buttons, five buttons down the front, shoulder straps, police / military pattern.	Cotton, blackish grey Mazri cloth shirt, two front pockets on both breasts with plain flaps to buttons, five buttons down the front, shoulder straps, police / military pattern.	Cotton, blackish grey Mazri cloth shirt, two front pockets on both breasts with plain flaps to buttons, five buttons down the front, shoulder straps, police / military pattern.	Cotton, blackish grey Mazri cloth shirt, two front pockets on both breasts with plain flaps to buttons, five buttons down the front, shoulder straps, police / military pattern.	Cotton, blackish grey Mazri cloth shirt, two front pockets on both breasts with plain flaps to buttons, five buttons down the front, shoulder straps, police / military pattern.
Shirt (Women)	Cotton, blackish grey Mazri cloth Frock or Qamees, two front pockets on both breasts with plain flaps to buttons, shoulder straps, removable waist belt with buckle, police / military pattern, long up to knees, design suiting religious /social norms and values.	Cotton, blackish grey Mazri cloth Frock or Qamees, two front pockets on both breasts with plain flaps to buttons, shoulder straps, removable waist belt with buckle, police / military pattern, long up to knees, design suiting religious /social norms and values.	Cotton, blackish grey Mazri cloth Frock or Qamees, two front pockets on both breasts with plain flaps to buttons, shoulder straps, removable waist belt with buckle, police / military pattern, long up to knees, design suiting religious /social norms and values.	Cotton, blackish grey Mazri cloth Frock or Qamees, two front pockets on both breasts with plain flaps to buttons, shoulder straps, removable waist belt with buckle, police / military pattern, long up to knees, design suiting religious /social norms and values.	Cotton, blackish grey Mazri cloth Frock or Qamees, two front pockets on both breasts with plain flaps to buttons, shoulder straps, removable waist belt with buckle, police / military pattern, long up to knees, design suiting religious /social norms and values.	Cotton, blackish grey Mazri cloth Frock or Qamees, two front pockets on both breasts with plain flaps to buttons, shoulder straps, removable waist belt with buckle, police / military pattern, long up to knees, design suiting religious /social norms and values.	Cotton, blackish grey Mazri cloth Frock or Qamees, two front pockets on both breasts with plain flaps to buttons, shoulder straps, removable waist belt with buckle, police / military pattern, long up to knees, design suiting religious /social norms and values.
Dopatta (Women Only)	Grey Muslin Cloth, 2 metres, 28 centimetres	Grey Muslin Cloth, 2 metres, 28 centimetres	Grey Muslin Cloth, 2 metres, 28 centimetres	Grey Muslin Cloth, 2 metres, 28 centimetres	Grey Muslin Cloth, 2 metres, 28 centimetres	Grey Muslin Cloth, 2 metres, 28 centimetres	Grey Muslin Cloth, 2 metres, 28 centimetres
Trouser (Men)	Khaki slacks, Cotton, Zeen cloth, two side pockets and one on the back or Khaki Cargo Trousers, two side pockets, two front pockets on thighs, two pockets on the back, may be tucked-in boots at the bottom.	Khaki slacks, Cotton, Zeen cloth, two side pockets and one on the back or Khaki Cargo Trousers, two side pockets, two front pockets on thighs, two pockets on the back, may be tucked-in boots at the bottom.	Khaki slacks, Cotton, Zeen cloth, two side pockets and one on the back or Khaki Cargo Trousers, two side pockets, two front pockets on thighs, two pockets on the back, may be tucked-in boots at the bottom.	Khaki slacks, Cotton, Zeen cloth, two side pockets and one on the back or Khaki Cargo Trousers, two side pockets, two front pockets on thighs, two pockets on the back, may be tucked-in boots at the bottom.	Khaki slacks, Cotton, Zeen cloth, two side pockets and one on the back or Khaki Cargo Trousers, two side pockets, two front pockets on thighs, two pockets on the back, may be tucked-in boots at the bottom.	Khaki slacks, Cotton, Zeen cloth, two side pockets and one on the back or Khaki Cargo Trousers, two side pockets, two front pockets on thighs, two pockets on the back, may be tucked-in boots at the bottom.	Khaki slacks, Cotton, Zeen cloth, two side pockets and one on the back or Khaki Cargo Trousers, two side pockets, two front pockets on thighs, two pockets on the back, may be tucked-in boots at the bottom.
Trouser (Women)	Shalwar, Grey, Mazri Cotton or linen.	Shalwar, Grey, Mazri Cotton or linen.	Shalwar, Grey, Mazri Cotton or linen.	Shalwar, Grey, Mazri Cotton or linen.	Shalwar, Grey, Mazri Cotton or linen.	Shalwar, Grey, Mazri Cotton or linen.	Shalwar, Grey, Mazri Cotton or linen.
Socks	Plain cotton brown or cotton black without any embroidery work or designing	Plain cotton brown or cotton black without any embroidery work or designing	Plain cotton brown or cotton black without any embroidery work or designing	Plain cotton brown or cotton black without any embroidery work or designing	Plain cotton brown or cotton black without any embroidery work or designing	Plain cotton brown or cotton black without any embroidery work or designing	Plain cotton brown or cotton black without any embroidery work or designing
Shoes / Boots (Men)	Long brown /black ammunition boots or Oxford Pattern brown /black shoes with toe and Laces.	Long brown /black ammunition boots or Oxford Pattern brown /black shoes with toe and Laces.	Long brown /black ammunition boots or Oxford Pattern brown /black shoes with toe and Laces.	Long brown /black ammunition boots or Oxford Pattern brown /black shoes with toe and Laces.	Long brown /black ammunition boots or Oxford Pattern brown /black shoes with toe and Laces.	Long brown /black ammunition boots or Oxford Pattern brown /black shoes with toe and Laces.	Long brown /black ammunition boots or Oxford Pattern brown /black shoes with toe and Laces.
Shoes / Boots (Women)	Black or brown leather walking shoes with laces or Velcro.	Black or brown leather walking shoes with laces or Velcro.	Black or brown leather walking shoes with laces or Velcro.	Black or brown leather walking shoes with laces or Velcro.	Black or brown leather walking shoes with laces or Velcro.	Black or brown leather walking shoes with laces or Velcro.	Black or brown leather walking shoes with laces or Velcro.
Gorget Patches	Turned down collar with blue Gorget Patches with a silver-colour button at the upper end containing national emblem facing upward, of the same pattern as prescribed for Major-General in Pakistan Army / Additional IG Police (BPS-21)	Turned down collar with blue Gorget Patches with a silver-colour button at the upper end containing national emblem facing upward, of the same pattern as prescribed for Brigadier in Pakistan Army / DIG Police (BPS-20)	Turned down collar with blue Gorget Patches with a silver-colour button at the upper end containing national emblem facing upward, of the same pattern as prescribed for Colonel in Pakistan Army / SSP (BPS-19) in Police	Not authorised	Not authorised	Not authorised	Not authorised
Formation Sign	Embroidered, silver-colour, floral circlet with inscriptions "PRISONS" and national emblem on the top on a round circle with upper half red and lower half blue to be worn on left arm above elbow three inches below the shoulder line.	Embroidered, silver-colour, floral circlet with inscriptions "PRISONS" and national emblem on the top on a round circle with upper half red and lower half blue to be worn on left arm above elbow three inches below the shoulder line.	Embroidered, silver-colour, floral circlet with inscriptions "PRISONS" and national emblem on the top on a round circle with upper half red and lower half blue to be worn on left arm above elbow three inches below the shoulder line.	Embroidered, silver-colour, floral circlet with inscriptions "PRISONS" and national emblem on the top on a round circle with upper half red and lower half blue to be worn on left arm above elbow three inches below the shoulder line.	Embroidered, silver-colour, floral circlet with inscriptions "PRISONS" and national emblem on the top on a round circle with upper half red and lower half blue to be worn on left arm above elbow three inches below the shoulder line.	Embroidered, silver-colour, floral circlet with inscriptions "PRISONS" and national emblem on the top on a round circle with upper half red and lower half blue to be worn on left arm above elbow three inches below the shoulder line.	Embroidered, silver-colour, floral circlet with inscriptions "PRISONS" and national emblem on the top on a round circle with upper half red and lower half blue to be worn on left arm above elbow three inches below the shoulder line.
Name Plate	Plastic or metal with sky blue /black background and name in one word (only), written in white/ silver colour in capital letters (only)	Plastic or metal with sky blue /black background and name in one word (only), written in white/ silver colour in capital letters (only)	Plastic or metal with sky blue /black background and name in one word (only), written in white/ silver colour in capital letters (only)	Plastic or metal with sky blue /black background and name in one word (only), written in white/ silver colour in capital letters (only)	Plastic or metal with sky blue /black background and name in one word (only), written in white/ silver colour in capital letters (only)	Plastic or metal with sky blue /black background and name in one word (only), written in white/ silver colour in capital letters (only)	Plastic or metal with sky blue /black background and name in one word (only), written in white/ silver colour in capital letters (only)
Medals / Ribbons	According to length of service and as admissible to the civil armed forces, police and rangers, etc.	According to length of service and as admissible to the civil armed forces, police and rangers, etc.	According to length of service and as admissible to the civil armed forces, police and rangers, etc.	According to length of service and as admissible to the civil armed forces, police and rangers, etc.	According to length of service and as admissible to the civil armed forces, police and rangers, etc.	According to length of service and as admissible to the civil armed forces, police and rangers, etc.	According to length of service and as admissible to the civil armed forces, police and rangers, etc.
Shoulder Titles	Nil	Nil	Nil	"PRISONS"	"PRISONS"	"PRISONS"	"PRISONS"
Shoulder Ranks	Silver, metal, crossing sword and baton on both shoulder flashes below one diamond-shaped pip as prescribed for Major-General of the Pakistan Army / Additional IG Police in Pakistan	Silver, metal, national emblem above three diamond-shaped pips arranged in an equilateral triangle on both shoulder flashes as prescribed for Brigadier of the Pakistan Army / DIG Police in Pakistan	Silver, metal, national emblem above two diamond-shaped pips on both shoulder flashes as prescribed for Colonel of the Pakistan Army / SSP (BPS-19) in Pakistan	Silver, metal, national emblem above one diamond-shaped pip on both shoulder flashes as prescribed for Lieutenant Colonel of the Pakistan Army / Superintendent of Police (BPS-18) in Pakistan with 12 years or more service and course qualified for promotion to BPS-19	Silver, metal, national emblem on both shoulder flashes as prescribed for Major of the Pakistan Army / Superintendent of Police (BPS-18) in Pakistan with less than 12 years service	Silver, metal, three diamond-shaped pips on both shoulder flashes as prescribed for Capt of the Pakistan Army / Deputy Superintendent of Police in Pakistan	Silver, metal, two diamond-shaped pips on both shoulder flashes as prescribed for Lieutenant of the Pakistan Army / Assistant Superintendent of Police in Pakistan
Belt	Sam Browne leather or nylon police belt, black or brown, brass fittings, may be perforated	Sam Browne leather or nylon police belt, black or brown, brass fittings, may be perforated	Sam Browne leather or nylon police belt, black or brown, brass fittings, may be perforated	Sam Browne leather or nylon police belt, black or brown, brass fittings, without perforations	Sam Browne leather or nylon police belt, black or brown, brass fittings, without perforations	Sam Browne leather or nylon police belt, black or brown, brass fittings, without perforations	Sam Browne leather or nylon police belt, black or brown, brass fittings, without perforations
Belt Plate / Badge	Rectangular, silver / steel, national emblem on the top, floral circlet, crossing sword and baton inside	Rectangular, silver / steel, floral circlet crescent containing a five-corner star inside, matching the cap badge	Rectangular, silver / steel, floral circlet crescent containing a five-corner star inside, matching the cap badge	Rectangular, silver / steel, national emblem on the top, floral circlet with inscription "PRISONS" inside	Rectangular, silver / steel, national emblem on the top, floral circlet with inscription "PRISONS" inside	Rectangular, silver / steel, national emblem on the top, floral circlet with inscription "PRISONS" inside	Rectangular, silver / steel, national emblem on the top, floral circlet with inscription "PRISONS" inside
Swagger Stick	Malacca cane	Malacca cane	Malacca cane	Cane covered with brown or black leather, chrome caps on both ends, inscription "PRISONS" at one end-cap	Cane covered with brown or black leather, chrome caps on both ends, inscription "PRISONS" at one end-cap	Cane covered with brown or black leather, chrome caps on both ends, inscription "PRISONS" at one end-cap	Cane covered with brown or black leather, chrome caps on both ends, inscription "PRISONS" at one end-cap

== Administrative regions ==
The jails in the province of Punjab were grouped into four circles for the purpose of the appointment, promotion and transfer of warders and for better organization. In 2004, these circles were replaced with regions with independent regional offices (detached from Headquarter Jails). At present, prisons regions have been established at Lahore, Multan, Rawalpindi, Faisalabad, Sahiwal, Bahawalpur Sargodha Gujranwala and Dera Ghazi Khan.

== List of jails ==
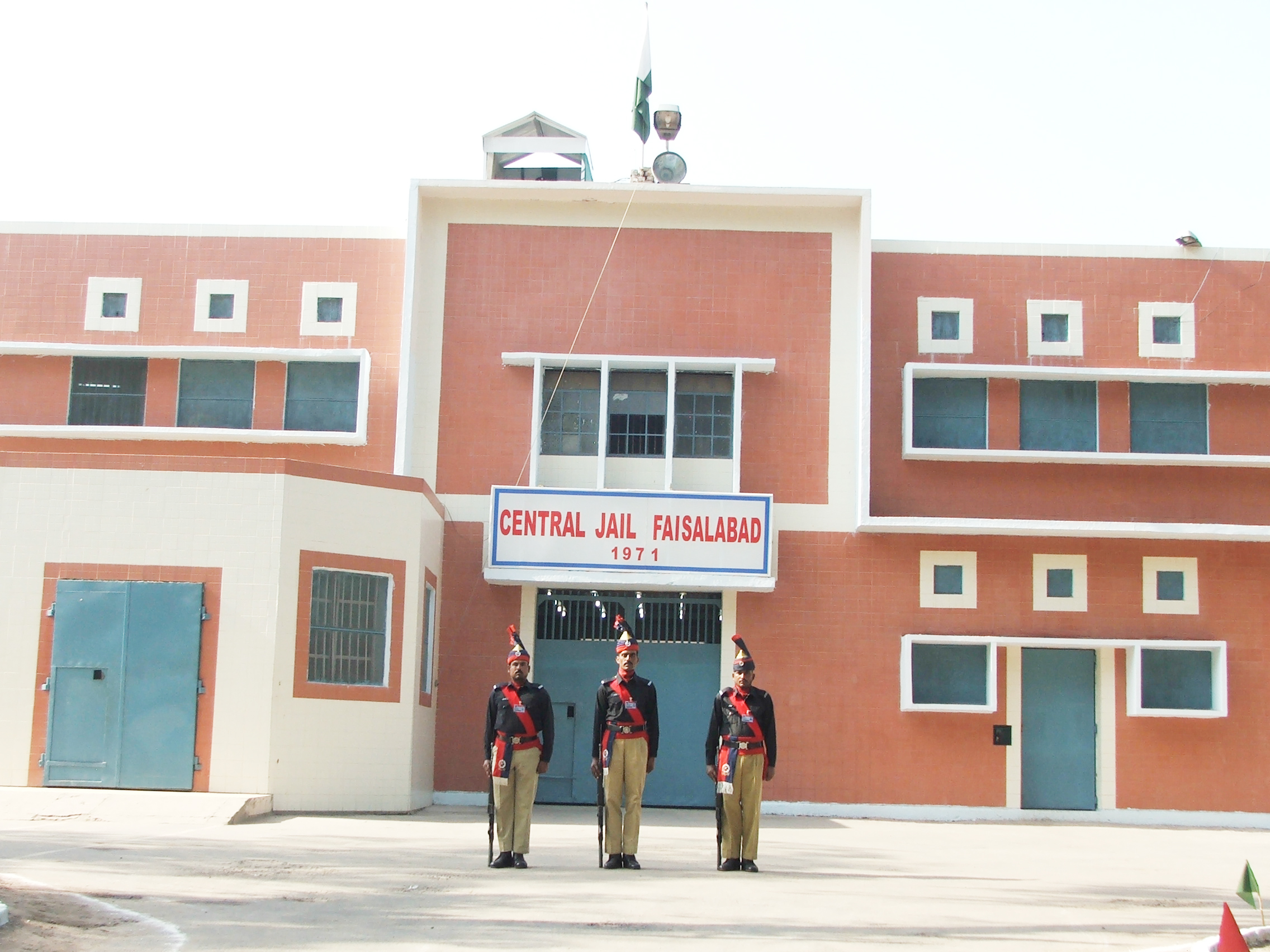
An outer view of Administrative Block of Central Jail Faisalabad, Pakistan in October, 2011

The following table shows detailed list, as it stood on 30 July 2018, of all 43 jails in the province of Punjab, Pakistan.

Serial No.	Name of Region	Name of Jail	Year of Construction	Authorised Population of Inmates	Actual Population of Inmates
01.	Lahore Region	Central Jail Lahore (at Kot Lakhpat)	1965–1967		3642
02.		Central Jail Gujranwala	1854		3945
03.		Central Jail Sahiwal	1899		4002
04.		District Jail Lahore	1930		1700
05.		District Jail Sheikhupura	1921		2433
06.		District Jail Kasur	1929		1475
07.		District Jail Sialkot	1865		2187
08.	Multan Region	New Central Jail Multan	1930		2799
09.		New Central Jail Bahawalpur	1955		2320
10.		Borstal Institution and Juvenile Jail Bahawalpur	1882		104
11.		Central Jail Dera Ghazi Khan	1913		1155
12.		District Jail Multan	1872		998
13.		District Jail Rajanpur	1860		272
14.		District Jail Vehari			898
15.		Women Jail Multan	1973-74	166	94
16.		District Jail Rahim Yar Khan	1950		1048
17.		District Jail Bahawalnagar	1947		621
18.		District Jail Muzaffar Garh	1908		650
19.	Rawalpindi Region	Central Jail Rawalpindi	1985–86		4807
20.		District Jail Attock	1906		734
21.		District Jail Jhelum	1854		819
22.		District Jail Mandi Bahauddin	1978		787
23.		District Jail Gujrat	1930		1308
24.		District Jail Chakwal	1998		153
25.	Faisalabad Region	Central Jail Faisalabad	1971		2830
26.		Central Jail Mianwali	1903		1826
27.		Borstal Institution and Juvenile Jail Faisalabad	2001	224	146
28.		District Jail Faisalabad	1873		2032
29.		District Jail Jhang	1975		1870
30.		District Jail Toba Tek Singh			924
31.		District Jail Sargodha	1910		1642
32.		District Jail Shahpur	1873		917

== Punjab Prisons officers /officials and their relatives martyred during service ==
Following table shows list of Punjab Prisons Officers /officials and their relatives martyred during service.

Serial No.	Name of the officer /official	Rank /Designation	Place of Posting	Date of murder	Summary of incident	Apparent motive of murder
01.	Amanat Ali	Head Warder	Central Jail Gujranwala	18 March 1992	Killed by prisoners during riot at the jail	Criminal
02.	Mr. Zain-ul-Aabdeen Abbasi	Superintendent of Jail	District Jail Jhang	20 May 1992	Saleem alias Fauji, a worker of defunct Sipah-e-Sahaba Pakistan killed him as he being Superintendent of Jail denied to give illegal facilities to a prisoner named Zubair Butt belonging to the defunct Sipah-e-Sahaba Pakistan	Criminal (and maybe) sectarian
03.	Ikramullah Khan son of Iqbal Ahmed	Assistant Superintendent of Jail	District Jail Lahore	16 September 1992	Killed by criminals in collusion with a prisoner named Ebaha Gujjar confined in the jail	Criminal
04.	Syed Sibt-e-Hassan Naqvi	Superintendent of Central Jail	Central Jail Lahore	18 February 1994	Killed by activists /militantcs of defunct Sipah-e-Sahaba Pakistan	Criminal (and maybe) sectarian
05.	Muhammad Arshad	Storekeeper	Central Jail Lahore	18 April 1994	Killed by activists /militants of defunct Sipah-e-Sahaba Pakistan	Criminal
06.	Abdul Khaliq son of Irshad Ahmed	Warder No.3386	New Central Jail Bahawalpur	2 April 1995	Killed by the robbers while he was carrying monthly salaries of the jail staff from the bank on official vehicle No.MHA-825	Robbery
07.	Fateh Sher son of Zahoor Ahmed	Junior Clerk	New Central Jail Bahawalpur	4 April 1995	Killed by the robbers while he was carrying monthly salaries of the jail staff from the bank on official vehicle No.MHA-825	Robbery
08.	Saeed Ahmed	Warder No.2459	New Central Jail Multan	1 January 1996	He was stabbed with an improvised cutter by a prisoner sentenced to death, succumbed to fatal injuries and died	Criminal
09.	Mazhar Hussain	Warder No.3320	District Jail Rahim Yar Khan	4 September 1998	Murdered	Criminal
10.	Muhammad Anwar	Warder No.8143	District Jail Sheikhupura	30 December 2004	Murdered	Criminal
11.	Khalil Ahmed	Dispenser	District Jail Sheikhupura	2004	Criminals including ex-prisoners killed him and his wife at their official quarters in the jail staff colony	Criminal
12.	Wife of Khalil Ahmed	Wife of Dispenser	District Jail Sheikhupura	2004	Criminals including ex-prisoners killed her and her husband Khalil Ahmed Dispenser at their official quarters in the jail staff colony	Criminal
13.	Jam Aziz-ur-Rehman	Superintendent of Jail	District Jail Rahim Yar Khan	1 February 2005	Killed by activists /militants of defunct Sipah-e-Sahaba Pakistan while he was returning from Tableeghi Markaz in the night between 27 and 28 January 2005, succumbed to fatal injuries and died on 1 February 2005	Criminal
14.	Bashir Ahmed son of Ahmed Bakhsh	Head Warder No.2547	New Central Jail Bahawalpur	21 July 2006	Seriously injured by unknown criminals on 21 July 2006 and died on the way while being carried to Bahawal Victoria Hospital, Bahawalpur succumbing to fatal injuries	Criminal
15.	Basharat Ali son of Bashir	Warder No.8397	District Jail Lahore	29 July 2006	Killed by criminals in collusion with a prisoner named Saqib Langrra confined in the jail	Criminal
16.	Muhammad Aslam son of Sardar Khan	Warder No.7862	District Jail Lahore	Injured on 29 July 2006. Died on 9 August 2006	Killed by criminals in collusion with a prisoner named Saqib Langrra confined in the jail	Criminal
17.	Malik Zawar Ali	Assistant Superintendent of Jail	Central Jail Faisalabad	12 July 2008	Shot dead by the criminals on the way to his home in Dhuddiwala, Faisalabad after performing his duty at the jail	Criminal
18.	Habibullah Jajja	Deputy Superintendent of Jail	District Jail Rahim Yar Khan	17 February 2010	Shot dead by the activists /militants of Lashkar-e-Jhangvi while he was going to pick his children from their school	Criminal
19.	Dr. Azhar Waheed brother of Haji Mazhar Waheed, Deputy Superintendent of Jail	Doctor	His brother Haji Mazhar Waheed, Deputy Superintendent of Jail was then posted at Central Jail Sahiwal	29 September 2010 (killed at his clinic in Faisalabad	Killed by criminals in collusion with an escapee prisoner named Hafiz Tahir	Criminal
20.	Tahir Iqbal	Warder No.5382	Borstal Institution and Juvenile Jail Faisalabad	3 July 2012	Killed by the robbers on Faisalabad - Jaranwala road while he along with other jail officials was carrying monthly salaries of the jail staff from the bank on an official vehicle Suzuki Bolan. Cash was snatched by the robbers.	Robbery

== Female convicts executed since 1947 ==
Following table shows list of female condemned prisoners sentenced to death and finally hanged in various jails of Punjab (Pakistan) since 1947.

Serial No.	Name	Jail	Date of Execution
01.	Mst. Ghulam Fatima daughter of Lungar wife of Azam	Central Jail Mianwali	10 October 1956
02.	Mst. Ghafooraan wife of Muhammad Shah	District Jail Faisalabad	15 July 1961
03.	Mst. Saban wife of Khuda Bakhsh	District Jail Multan	13 November 1963
04.	Mst. Nusrat daughter of Ahmed Hussain	District Jail Faisalabad	28 August 1983
05.	Mst. Shakoori wife of Muhammad Ramzan	Central Jail Mianwali	14 March 1985
06.	Mst. Daulat Bibi wife of Mirza Khan	Central Jail Rawalpindi	7 May 1985
07.	Mst. Munawaran daughter of Sultan Bakhsh	District Jail Jhelum	28 October 1985
08.	Mst. Sanawaran daughter of Sultan Bakhsh	District Jail Jhelum	28 October 1985

== See also ==
- Prisons in Pakistan
- Government of Punjab, Pakistan
- Punjab Police (Pakistan)
- Prison Officer
- Headquarter Jail
- National Academy for Prisons Administration
