= District Jail Rawalpindi =

Coordinates: 33°35′05″N 73°04′25″E

- Interactive map of District Jail Rawalpindi
- Location: Rawalpindi, Pakistan
- Status: Not Operational
- Security class: Maximum
- Opened: 1882
- Closed: 1986
- Managed by: Government of the Punjab, Home Department

Notable prisoners
- Zulfikar Ali Bhutto Executed on 4 April 1979

District Jail Rawalpindi was a prominent jail in Rawalpindi, Pakistan located opposite Rawalpindi District Courts. It was established in 1882 on an area of 34.14 hectares (84.4 acres). The jail was inherited by the Punjab Prisons Department besides 18 other jails after independence.

On 4 April 1979, the former President and Prime Minister of Pakistan, Zulfiqar Ali Bhutto, was hanged in this jail.

In 1986, a new jail was constructed on Adiala Road nearly 13 kilometres away from the District Courts which was named Central Jail Rawalpindi.

The old jail was demolished in 1988 on the orders of military dictator Gen. Zia-ul-Haq and the grounds converted into Jinnah Park.

Some, especially activists of Zulfiqar Ali Bhutto's Pakistan Peoples Party believe that the District Jail Rawalpindi was demolished to destroy tangible reminders of Bhutto i.e. his death cell, execution gallows etc. which the party and his children could use to gain public sympathies and to launch effective political campaign against Zia-ul-Haq.

There is now a small monument marking the exact spot where the gallows Bhutto was hanged from once stood, although it is overshadowed by the McDonald's and multiplex movie theatre which share the park with amusement rides, a jogging track and other sports facilities.

== See also ==
- Government of Punjab, Pakistan
- Punjab Prisons (Pakistan)
- Central Jail Faisalabad
- Central Jail Lahore
- Prison Officer
- Headquarter Jail
- Central Jail Rawalpindi
- National Academy for Prisons Administration
