= Central Jail Sahiwal =

Prison in Sahiwal, Pakistan

- Location: Sahiwal, Pakistan
- Status: Operational
- Security class: Maximum
- Population: 4002 (14 November 2011)
- Opened: 1873; 153 years ago
- Managed by: Government of the Punjab, Home Department
- Director: Zubair Ahmed Cheema, Senior Superintendent of Jail
- Website: prisons.punjab.gov.pk/central_jail_sahiwal

Central Jail Sahiwal is a historic jail situated in Sahiwal, Pakistan. It was the largest jail in Asia with regard to the area and agricultural land until construction of High Security Prison and Punjab Prison Staff Training College adjacent to this jail.

== Prison industries ==
The following prison industries are functioning in the jail to train the convicted prisoners in various trades and handicrafts so that they could earn their living after their release, utilize prison labour in profitable works for benefit of state exchequer and keep the prisoners busy in useful tasks.

- Jute Tot Manufacturing Unit
- Prisoner Blanket Weaving Unit
- Carpet Knitting Unit

== See also ==
- Government of Punjab, Pakistan
- Punjab Prisons (Pakistan)
- Prison Officer
- Headquarter Jail
- National Academy for Prisons Administration
