= Central Jail Mianwali =

Prison in Punjab, Pakistan

- Location: Mianwali, Punjab, Pakistan
- Status: Operational
- Security class: Maximum security
- Population: 1783 (3 February 2010)
- Opened: 1904
- Managed by: Government of Punjab, Home Department
- Director: Dr.Muhammed Siddique Gill Superintendent of Jail

Notable prisoners
- Ilm-ud-din, Shaheed Bhagat Singh and Sheikh Mujibur Rahman

Central Jail Mianwali is an old and historical jail in Mianwali, Punjab, Pakistan located on Rawalpindi road nearly 8 kilometers away from Mianwali city. It is noted for housing a number of prominent prisoners, the most notable of these being Bangabandhu Sheikh Mujibur Rahman during the Bangladesh Liberation War.

== History ==
Mianwali Jail was constructed in 1904 with 293 prisoners in the Jail and was elevated as District jail in 1913. The inmates' population in 1913 was 228. Inside jail hospital crude death rate in 1911 was 6.49%. Major portion of the jail consists of muddy barracks and cell-blocks plastered with clay. In 1911, 364 prisoners remained admitted in the jail hospital, in 1912, 357 prisoners and in 1913, 516 prisoners. Prisoners in the jail were made to work and a variety of things were made by them which were put up for sale in the market. Profit earned in 1911 was Rs. 1863, in 1912, Rs. 1229 and in 1913, Rs. 1314. Nomenclature of the officer-in-charge of the jail during 1911-1913 was Superintendent of Jail under whom one jailer now referred to as Deputy Superintendent and two assistant jailors now referred to as Assistant Superintendents used to work. Jail had a staff of 40 warders in 1911. Ilmuddin was executed in this jail on 31 October 1929 during the British Rule. The condemned prisoners' cell in which he was confined during last night of his life (between 30 and 31 October 1929) is still intact. District Jail Mianwali was elevated as Central Jail in May 1960 and Jahangir Khan Hotyana was appointed as its first Superintendent. School for non-formal education of adults, hospital, mosque and library facilities are available in the present day Central Jail Mianwali.

Famous freedom fighter Bhagat Singh's hunger strike in 1929 in Mianwali Jail lasted 112 days, one of the world's longest hunger strikes at that time.

After a brutal crackdown initiated by president Yahya Khan, the founding president of Bangladesh, Sheikh Mujibur Rahman was arrested without charge and flown to West Pakistan where he was incarcerated in solitary confinement at the Central Jail Mianwali throughout the duration of the Bangladesh Liberation War. A military tribunal sentenced Sheikh Mujib to the penalty of death. A noose was subsequently prepared and a grave was dug by Indian prisoners imprisoned for spying. Sheikh Mujib's execution was deferred on three occasions. Bangabandhu was finally released after the surrender of Pakistani forces to joint Bangladeshi and Indian forces in January under the orders of the next Pakistani president Zulfiqar Ali Bhutto following immense international pressure.

== See also ==
- Government of Punjab, Pakistan
- Punjab Prisons (Pakistan)
- Central Jail Lahore
- Central Jail Faisalabad
- Headquarter Jail
- Central Jail Rawalpindi
- District Jail Rawalpindi
- National Academy for Prisons Administration
