= Central Jail Gujranwala =

Prison in Gujranwala, Pakistan

- Location: Gujranwala, Pakistan
- Status: Operational
- Security class: Maximum
- Population: 3109 (February 2024)
- Opened: 1883; 143 years ago
- Managed by: Government of the Punjab, Home Department
- Director: Abdullah Abubakar, Senior Superintendent Jail
- Website: prisons.punjab.gov.pk/central_jail_gujranwala

Central Jail Gujranwala is an ancient Jail situated in Gujranwala, Pakistan.

Central Jail Gujranwala is one of the oldest and most important prisons in Punjab, Pakistan. It was established in 1883 during the British colonial period and has served as a major correctional facility for well over a century. Located in Gujranwala, the jail is managed by the Punjab Prisons Department and houses convicted prisoners, undertrial prisoners, and high-security inmates. Although it was originally built for fewer than 1,000 prisoners, it now accommodates several thousand inmates. The prison provides healthcare services, educational and religious programs, vocational training, and recreational activities to support rehabilitation and help prisoners reintegrate into society.

== See also ==
- Government of Punjab, Pakistan
- Punjab Prisons (Pakistan)
- Prison Officer
- Headquarter Jail
- National Academy for Prisons Administration
