= Borstal Institution and Juvenile Jail Bahawalpur =

Pakistani Jail

Borstal Institution & Juvenile Jail Bahawalpur
- Interactive map of Borstal Institution & Juvenile Jail Bahawalpur
- Location: Bahawalpur, Pakistan; 29.3965°N 71.6855°E
- Status: Operational
- Security class: Minimum
- Opened: 1882
- Managed by: Government of the Punjab, Home Department
- Director: Mansoor Akbar, Superintendent Of Jail

Borstal Institution & Juvenile Jail Bahawalpur is the Old Central Jail situated near Fareed Gate in Bahawalpur, Pakistan.

== History ==
The jail was built in 1882 as a Central Jail. It was constructed with a view to confine long-term and life prisoners of Bahawalpur Division. After construction of New Central Jail Bahawalpur, it was declared as Borstal Institution & Juvenile Jail for confinement of juveniles.

== Prison industries ==
The following prison industries had been functioning in the jail in the past. to train the juvenile convicts in various trades and handicrafts so that they could earn their living after release form Jail, utilise prison labour in profitable works for benefit of state exchequer, and keep the juveniles busy in useful tasks.

- Jail Warder Uniform Tailoring / Stitching Unit
- Jail Warder Jersey Knitting Unit
- Carpet Knitting Unit
- Phenyle Manufacturing Unit

After promulgation of Juvenile Justice System Ordinance 2000, the prison labour in this juvenile jail has been terminated.

== See also ==
- Government of Punjab, Pakistan
- Punjab Prisons (Pakistan)
- Prison Officer
- Headquarter Jail
- National Academy for Prisons Administration
