= District Jail Multan =

Prison in Multan, Pakistan

Coordinates: 30.2062129°N 71.4392970°E

- Interactive map of District Jail Multan
- Location: Multan, Pakistan
- Security class: Medium
- Population: 1,119 prisoners as of 2009
- Managed by: Government of Punjab, Pakistan
- Director: Ammar Ahmed, Superintendent of Jail

District Jail Multan is an old district jail in Multan, Pakistan.

In 2021, Chief Minister of Punjab, Pakistan had some of their budget money allocated in their development package for Multan for the relocation of this old jail to a new location.

== See also ==
- Government of Punjab, Pakistan
- Punjab Prisons (Pakistan)
- Prison Officer
- Headquarter Jail
- National Academy for Prisons Administration
