= District Jail Lahore =

- Location: Lahore, Pakistan
- Status: Operational
- Security class: Maximum
- Capacity: around 4000
- Population: 3500 (November 2014)
- Opened: 1930
- Managed by: Government of the Punjab, Home Department
- Director: Zaheer Ahmed Virk, Superintendent of Jail

District Jail Lahore is an ancient Jail situated on Ferozepur Road in Lahore, Pakistan. Previously, it had been an open jail and referred to as Camp Jail.

== See also ==
- Government of Punjab, Pakistan
- Punjab Prisons (Pakistan)
- Prison officer
- Headquarter Jail
- National Academy for Prisons Administration
