= Central Jail, Dera Ghazi Khan =

Pakistan jail

Central Jail Dera Ghazi Khan
- Interactive map of Central Jail Dera Ghazi Khan
- Location: Dera Ghazi Khan, Pakistan; 33°29′14.62″N 73°2′24.49″E
- Security class: Maximum
- Capacity: 710
- Population: 1040 (8 January 2014)
- Opened: 1913
- Managed by: Government of Punjab, Pakistan
- Director: Farrukh Rasheed Superintendent of Jail
- Website: prisons.punjab.gov.pk/central_jail_dera_ghazi_khan

Central Jail Dera Ghazi Khan is a historic jail of Pakistan. Imran Khan spent several months in this jail during General Musharraf's rule.

== Administration ==
The prison is headed by the Superintendent Jail Farrukh Rasheed, who serves as the chief administrative officer. He is responsible for the overall administration of the prison, ensuring the implementation of prison rules, maintaining discipline, and overseeing the institution's operations.

== See also ==
- Government of Punjab, Pakistan
- Punjab Prisons (Pakistan)
- Prison Officer
- Headquarter Jail
- National Academy for Prisons Administration
