= District Jail Sheikhupura =

Jail situated in Punjab, Pakistan

Coordinates: 31.7149791°N 73.9707327°E

- Interactive map of District Jail Sheikhupura
- Location: Sheikhupura, Punjab, Pakistan
- Status: Operational
- Security class: Maximum security prison
- Capacity: 590
- Population: 2347 (2009)
- Opened: 1921
- Managed by: Government of the Punjab, Home Department (Punjab, Pakistan)
- Director: Mian Umair Ikram, Superintendent of Jail

District Jail Sheikhupura is an old Jail situated in Sheikhupura, Punjab, Pakistan.

In April 2025, some inmates took part in the Lahore Region Inmates Shooting Volleyball Tournament.

== See also ==
- Government of Punjab, Pakistan
- Punjab Prisons (Pakistan)
- Prison Officer
- Headquarter Jail
- National Academy for Prisons Administration
