= New Central Jail Multan =

Prison in Multan, Pakistan

Central Jail Multan
- Location: Multan, Pakistan
- Status: Operational
- Security class: Maximum
- Capacity: 1536
- Population: 2465 (1 January 2016)
- Opened: 1930
- Managed by: Government of the Punjab, Home Department
- Director: Asghar Ali, Senior Superintendent of Jail

Central Jail Multan is a prominent jail in Multan, Pakistan.

== History ==
The jail was built in 1930. It was constructed with a view to confine long-term and lifetime prisoners of Multan Region and to function as the Headquarter Jail for subordinate jail staffers of the region. After the creation of four regions of jails in the province of Punjab stationed at Lahore, Rawalpindi, Multan and Faisalabad, the role of Headquarter Jail has been shifted from the Superintendent of Central / Headquarter Jail Faisalabad to the regional Deputy Inspector General of Prisons in the year 2004. Indian RAW agent Ravinder Kaushik sahid and was buried inside the jail.

== Prison industries ==
The following prison industries are functioning in the jail to train the convicted prisoners in various trades and handicrafts so that they could earn their living after release form jail, utilise prison labour in profitable works for the benefit of the state exchequer, and keep the prisoners busy doing useful tasks.

- Convicted Prisoners' Uniform Weaving and Tailoring / Stitching Unit
- Carpet Knitting Unit

In addition to this, vocational training also functions at Central Multan. The following are four courses that are known to occur:

- Motor Winding
- Electric Home Appliance Repair
- Welding
- Motorcycle Mechanic

== See also ==
- Government of Punjab, Pakistan
- Punjab Prisons (Pakistan)
- Prison Officer
- Headquarter Jail
- National Academy for Prisons Administration
