= High Security Prison, Sahiwal =

Prison in Sahiwal, Pakistan

- Location: Sahiwal, Punjab, Pakistan
- Status: Operational
- Security class: Maximum
- Population: Nearly 100 prisoners
- Opened: 2015
- Managed by: Government of the Punjab, Punjab Prisons Department
- Director: Malik Liaquat Ali, Senior Superintendent of Jail

High Security Prison, Sahiwal is a jail in Sahiwal, Punjab, Pakistan, constructed to confine high-profile prisoners convicted in cases of terrorism and sabotage activities.

== Background ==
The jail which has been constructed on 98 acres with an estimated cost of Rs930.206 million will have capacity to hold 1,044 prisoners.

It has an automatic locking system in individual cells and accommodates prisoners from other provinces. It also follows a provision incorporated in the Protection of Pakistan Bill 2014. It has 70 percent of cellular confinement (500 individual cells) and 30 percent barrack system (6 barracks).

== See also ==
- Government of Punjab, Pakistan
- Punjab Prisons
- Prison Officer
- Headquarter Jail
- National Academy for Prisons Administration
