= District Jail Gujrat =

Jail in Gujrat, Punjab, Pakistan

- Location: Gujrat, Pakistan
- Security class: Maximum security prison
- Capacity: 385
- Population: 1396 (as of 2009)
- Opened: 1930
- Managed by: Government of Punjab, Pakistan
- Director: Kamran Haider Awan, Superintendent of Jail

District Jail Gujrat is an old jail situated in Gujrat, in the Punjab province, Pakistan. A major portion of the jail consists of cell blocks.

== See also ==
- Government of Punjab, Pakistan
- Punjab Prisons (Pakistan)
- Prison Officer
- Headquarter Jail
- National Academy for Prisons Administration
