= District Jail Sialkot =

Jail in Sialkot, Punjab, Pakistan

Coordinates: 32.5058347°N 74.5301674°E

- Interactive map of District Jail Sialkot
- Location: Sialkot, Pakistan
- Status: Operational
- Security class: Maximum security prison
- Capacity: 722
- Population: 2,364 prisoners (2009)
- Opened: 1863
- Managed by: Government of the Punjab, Home Department (Punjab, Pakistan)
- Director: Kashif Rasool Khalid , Superintendent of Jail

District Jail Sialkot is an old Jail situated in Sialkot, Pakistan.

Punjab Chief Minister Sardar Usman Buzdar paid a surprise visit in 2021 and took notice of the plight of women prisoners in District Jail Sialkot and reprimanded the Superintendent and Assistant Superintendent of the jail.

In April 2025 the Punjab Home Secretary Noor-ul-Amin Mengal suspended the superintendent of Sialkot District Jail during a surprise visit over accusations of “ mismanagement, negligence and administrative failures”. He called for all prison superintendents to equip inmates with technical skills to help rehabilitate them and to help inmates become productive members of society.

== See also ==
- Government of Punjab, Pakistan
- Punjab Prisons (Pakistan)
- Prison Officer
- Headquarter Jail
- National Academy for Prisons Administration
