= Borstal Institution and Juvenile Jail Faisalabad =

Jail in Faisalabad, Pakistan

Borstal Institution & Juvenile Jail Faisalabad
- Interactive map of Borstal Institution & Juvenile Jail Faisalabad
- Location: Faisalabad, Pakistan; 31°24′27″N 73°11′57″E
- Status: Operational
- Security class: Minimum
- Opened: 2005
- Managed by: Government of the Punjab, Home Department
- Director: Malik Asif Azeem, Senior Superintendent of Jail..

Borstal Institution & Juvenile Jail Faisalabad is in Faisalabad, Pakistan. It operates in accordance with provisions of Juvenile Justice System Ordinance 2000 and Punjab Juvenile Justice System Rules 2002.

== See also ==
- Government of Punjab, Pakistan
- Punjab Prisons (Pakistan)
- Prison Officer
- Headquarter Jail
- National Academy for Prisons Administration
