= District Jail Kasur =

Pakistani jail

Coordinates: 31.1152940°N 74.4706884°E

- Interactive map of District Jail Kasur
- Location: Kasur, Pakistan
- Status: Operational
- Security class: Maximum security prison
- Capacity: 444
- Population: 1751 (2009)
- Opened: 1929
- Managed by: Government of the Punjab, Home Department (Punjab, Pakistan)
- Director: Akhtar Iqbal, Superintendent of Jail

District Jail Kasur is an old jail in Kasur, Punjab, Pakistan.

== See also ==
- Government of Punjab, Pakistan
- Punjab Prisons (Pakistan)
- Prison Officer
- Headquarter Jail
- National Academy for Prisons Administration
