= Open compensation plan =

Open system that determines the wage of an employee

An open compensation plan (or system or policy) is one with a defined pay scale and no rules about keeping employee pay confidential. Open compensation plans are noted for reducing employee turnover.

One example of an organization with an open compensation system is the U.S. military.

Another example is many school districts, which normally post openly the compensation of teachers and administrators.
