= District Jail Jhelum =

Pakistani jail

- Location: Jhelum, Pakistan
- Security class: Maximum security prison
- Capacity: 416
- Population: 805 prisoners as of 2009
- Opened: 1854
- Managed by: Government of Punjab, Pakistan
- Director: Ghulam Sarwar Superintendent of Jail

District Jail Jhelum is a prominent jail in Jhelum, Pakistan. It is one of the oldest jails in Pakistan which is used for prisoners of Jhelum and Chakwal.

== Former prisoners ==
- Engineer Mirza (born 1977), Pakistani cleric and commentator

== See also ==
- Government of Punjab, Pakistan
- Punjab Prisons (Pakistan)
- Prison Officer
- Headquarter Jail
- National Academy for Prisons Administration
