= Juvenile Justice System Ordinance 2000 =

The 200 Juvenile Justice System Ordinance (XXII OF 2000) is an ordinance promulgated in Pakistan in 2000 to provide for protection of the rights of children involved in criminal litigation.

== See also ==
- Borstal Institution and Juvenile Jail Bahawalpur
- Borstal Institution and Juvenile Jail Faisalabad
