= Ilm-ud-Din =

Indian murderer (1908–1929)

Ilm Deen
- Born: 4 December 1908; Lahore, Punjab, British India
- Died: 31 October 1929 (aged 20); Central Jail Mianwali, Punjab, British India
- Resting place: Miani Sahib Graveyard
- Status: Executed by hanging
- Conviction: Murder
- Penalty: Death

Ilm Deen, also written as Alimuddin (4 December 1908 – 31 October 1929), was an Indian Muslim carpenter who assassinated a book publisher named Mahashe Rajpal Malhotra for publishing the book Rangila Rasul, which was deemed derogatory towards the Islamic prophet Muhammad by Muslims. He was executed for this crime.

In Pakistan, a full-length feature film has been produced on the life of Alimuddin and screened on television worldwide.

== Background ==
Mahashe Rajpal published an anonymous pamphlet in 1923 titled Rangila Rasul, which contained a discourteous interpretation of the hadiths of Sahih al-Bukhari, among other sources, along with a salacious commentary. The book was considered highly controversial due to its satire of the marital life of Muhammad.

Various sections of the Indian Muslim community started a movement demanding that the book be banned. In 1927, the administration of the British Raj enacted a law prohibiting insults aimed at founders and leaders of religious communities.

== Murder ==
Ilm Deen decided to kill the publisher. On April 6, 1929, he set out for the bazaar and purchased a dagger for one rupee. He hid the dagger in his pants and waited for Rajpal at some distance from Rajpal's shop. Rajpal had not arrived yet. Ilm Deen did not know what Rajpal looked like. He tried to find out where Rajpal was through people that were around. Rajpal entered the shop and Ilm Deen did not notice him but soon someone alerted him that Rajpal was inside. The young man entered the shop, lunged forward and attacked him. He stabbed his dagger into the chest of Rajpal. He fell to the ground and died instantly. The police arrested Ilm Deen and took him to Lahori Gate Police Station. Later Ilm Deen was shifted to Central Jail Mianwali. The murder caused considerable religious tension in Punjab and beyond.

== Trial and execution ==
The trial lawyer for Ilm Deen was Farrukh Hussain.

Two witnesses from the prosecution side claimed that he was guilty. Muhammad Ali Jinnah, then a prominent Indian lawyer, and later the founder of Pakistan, was then sought out to appear in the appeal hearing at the Lahore High Court. Jinnah appealed on the grounds of extenuating circumstances, saying that Ilm Deen was only 19 or 20. He asked for the death sentence to be commuted to imprisonment for life. This contention was rejected by the court. Ilm Deen was convicted and given the death penalty according to the Indian Penal Code, and subsequently executed.

== In popular culture ==
Ilm Deen enjoys popularity among some of Pakistan's Islamists, who perceive him as a defender of the faith who has unjustly been executed and thus became a martyr, leading to many apologetic books and movies being made as a way to commemorate him.

=== Books ===
Year	Title	Author	Publisher	Language
1929	Shahīd-i Islām Janāb G̲ẖāzī ʻIlmuddīn Shahīd	Muhammad Ismaʻil	Munshī Naṣīr Aḥmad, Lahore	Punjabi
1972	ʻĀshiq-i rasūl-i maqbūl G̲h̲āzī ʻIlm Dīn shahīd	Miyān̲ Muḥammad Abūlfatḥ	Maktaban Merī Library, Lahore	Urdu
1982	G̲h̲āzī ʻIlmuddīn Shahīd	Rā'e Muḥammad Kamāl	Karam Publications, Lahore	Urdu
1990	G̲h̲āzī ʻIlmuddīn shahīd	Ẓafar Iqbāl Nagīnah	Jang Publications, Lahore	Urdu
2004	Naʻt-i ʻishq-i Muḥammad : barāʼe G̲h̲āzī ʻIlmuddīn Shahīd	Sayyid Ṣādiq Shāh	Zawiya Publishers, Lahore	Punjabi
2007	G̲h̲āzī ʻIlmuddīn shahīd : Shahīd-i nāmūs-i risālat	K̲h̲ūlah Matīn	ʻIlm va ʻIrfān Publishers, Lahore	Urdu
2007	G̲h̲āzī ʻIlmuddīn Shahīd raḥmatulláh alaih	Sayyid Muḥammad ʻUsmān	Nūrī Kutub K̲h̲ānah, Lahore	Urdu
2008	G̲h̲āzī ʻIlmuddīn shahīd	Farḥān Zulfiqār	Ḥamzah Buks, Lahore	Urdu

=== Films ===
Year	Title	Director	Producer	Actor who portrayed Ilm Deen	Language
1978	Ghazi Ilmuddin Shaheed	Haidar	Haidar	Haidar	Punjabi
2002	Ghazi Ilmuddin Shaheed	Rasheed Dogar	Riaz & Shehzad Gujjar	Moammar Rana	Urdu

== Bibliography ==
- Ambedkar, Bhimrao Ramji (1945). Thoughts On Pakistan (Google Books) (published 2015). OCLC 5167934.
- Assad, Ahmed (31 October 2018). "A brief history of the anti-blasphemy laws". Karachi: Herald (Pakistan). Dawn Media Group.
- Nair, Neeti (7 August 2013). "Beyond the 'Communal' 1920s: The Problem of Intention, Legislative Pragmatism, and the Making of Section 295A of the Indian Penal Code". The Indian Economic & Social History Review. 50 (3). Thousand Oaks, California: SAGE Publishing: 317–340. doi:10.1177/0019464613494622. S2CID 144068997.
