= Pay scale =

System that determines the wage of an employee

A pay scale (also known as a salary structure) is a system that determines how much an employee is to be paid as a wage or salary, based on one or more factors such as the employee's level, rank or status within the employer's organization, the length of time that the employee has been employed, and the difficulty of the specific work performed.

Examples of pay scales include U.S. uniformed services pay grades, the salary grades by which United States military personnel are paid, and the General Schedule, the salary grades by which United States white-collar civil service personnel are paid. Many states, including New York, have pay scales for civil servants.

Private employers use salary structures with grades (including minimums, midpoints and maximums) to define the ranges of pay available to employees in each grade or range.

== See also ==
- Open compensation plan, having pay scale openly shared
