= Inspector general of prisons =

Inspector General of Prisons, shortened to IG of Prisons or IG Prisons, is the highest ranking official in a country's prison and probation service, usually the provincial commanding and controlling officer and chief/head of all district, central, special and women jails/prisons, borstal institutions, and remand homes within Bangladesh, India, Pakistan or Sri Lanka.

The Deputy Inspector General of Prisons, shortened to DIG of Prisons or DIG Prisons, is a high-ranking official in the provincial prison service, usually the controlling officer or head of a region or circle of district, central, special and women jails/prisons, borstal institutions and remand homes within a province in Bangladesh, India, Pakistan and Sri Lanka.

== See also ==
- AIG Prisons
- Senior Superintendent of Jail
- Superintendent of Jail
