= Central Jail Faisalabad =

Jail in Faisalabad, Pakistan

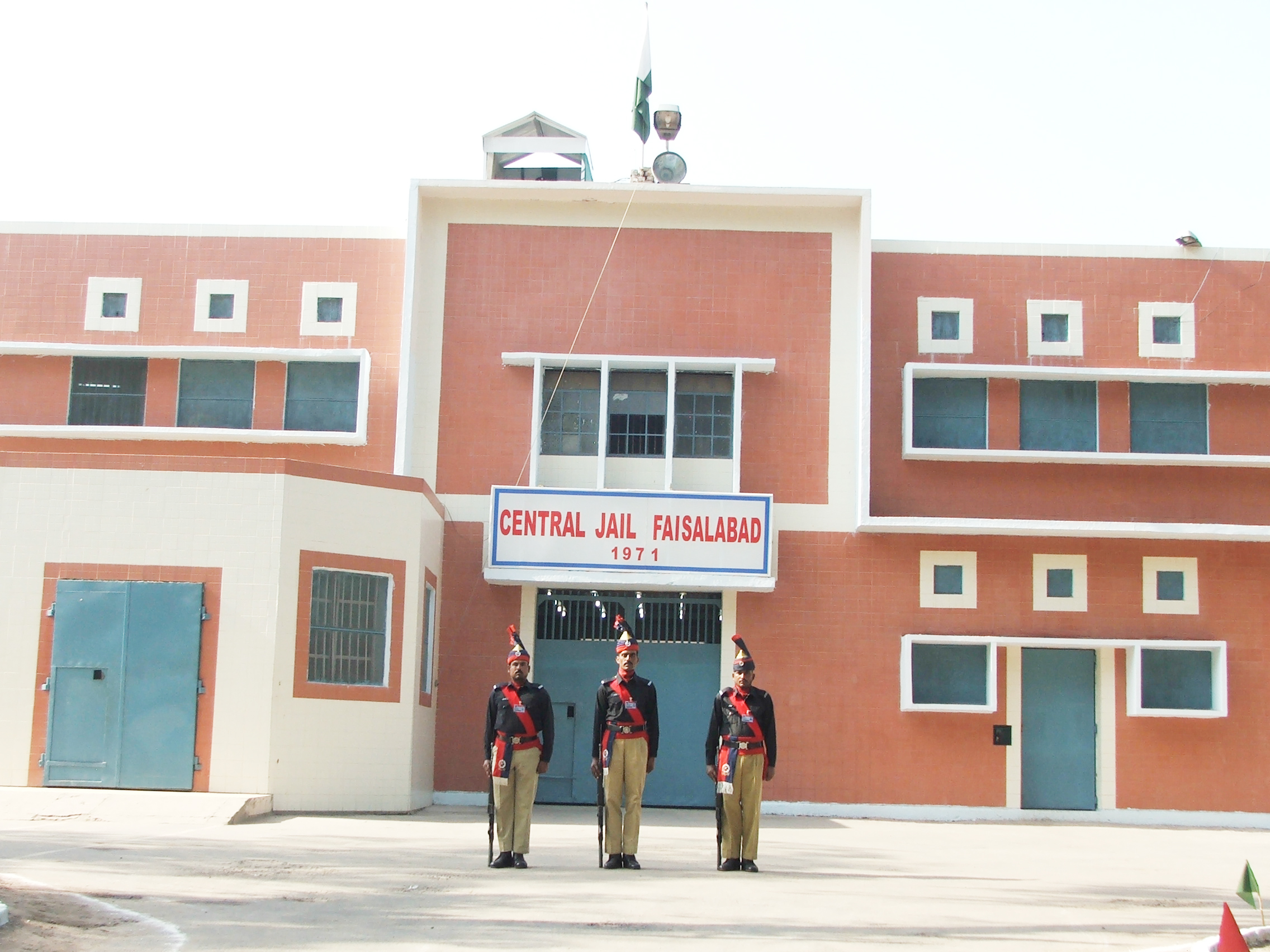
- Administrative Block of Central Jail Faisalabad, October 2011
- Interactive map of Central Jail Faisalabad
- Location: Faisalabad, Pakistan; 31.389935°N 73.185489°E
- Status: Operational
- Security class: Maximum
- Capacity: 2088
- Population: 3346 (17 August 2017)
- Opened: 1 July 1971
- Managed by: Government of the Punjab, Home Department
- Director: Abdul Ghafoor Anjum, Senior Superintendent of Jail

Central Jail Faisalabad is a prison in Faisalabad, Pakistan. It located on Jaranwala Road nearly 10 kilometres (6.2 mi) east of Faisalabad city.

== History ==
The jail was built in 1967 and formally inaugurated on 1st July 1971. It was constructed with a view to confine long-term prisoners of Faisalabad Region (except Mianwali and adjoining districts) and to function as Headquarter Jail for jail staffers of the region. After creation of four administrative regions of jails in the province of Punjab (at Lahore, Rawalpindi, Multan and Faisalabad) the role of Headquarter Jail shifted from the Superintendent of Central / Headquarter Jail Faisalabad to the regional Deputy Inspector General of Prisons in 2004.

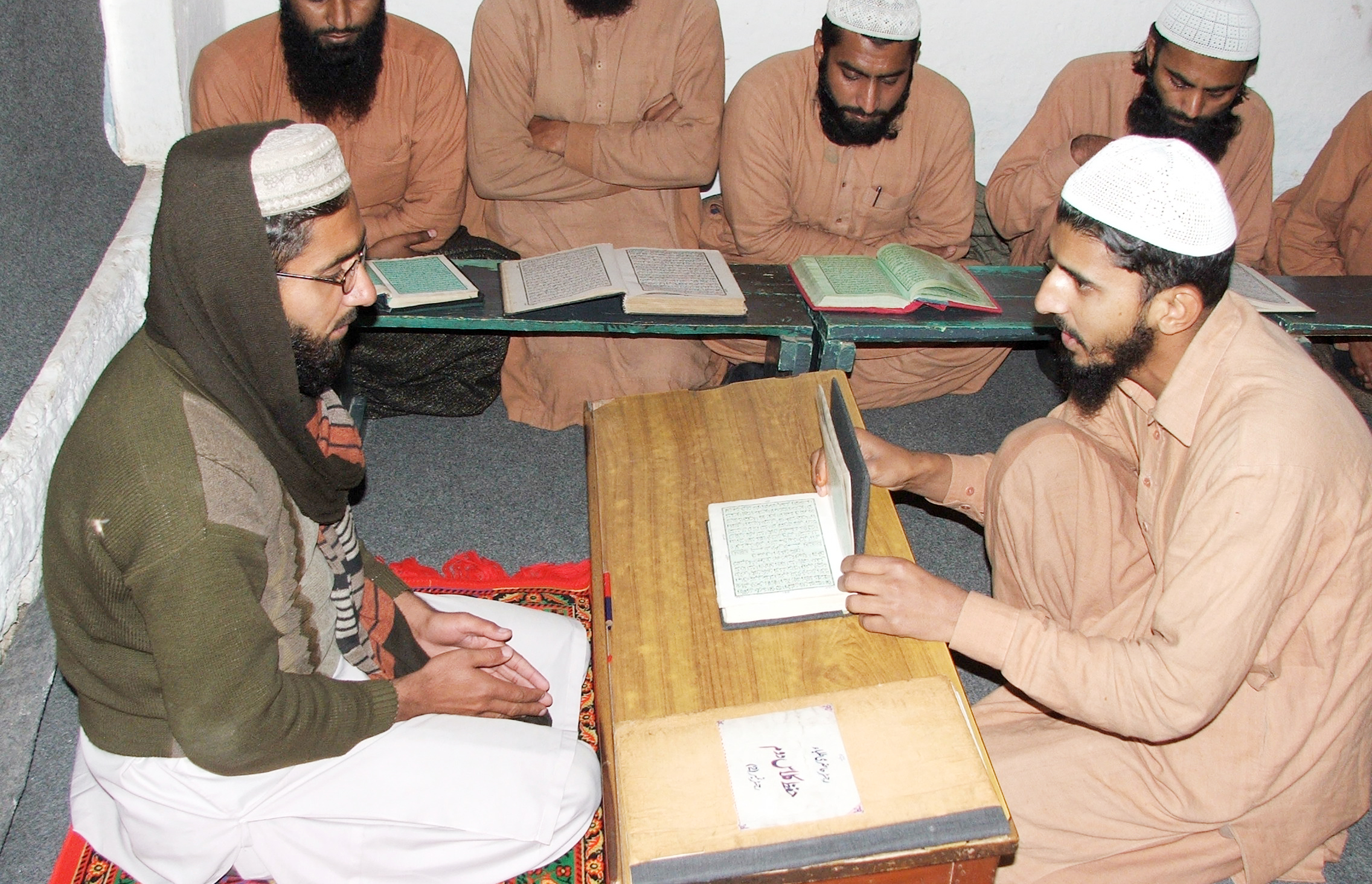
The prison provides education, particularly religious education, to reform convicts. Convicted prisoners receiving Qur'anic education in 2010

== Family Rooms ==
A scheme for construction of Family Rooms, an entirely new concept in Pakistan, for long-term convicted prisoners at larger jails including Central Jail Faisalabad was initiated in the year 2006. After completion of these Family Rooms, the prisoners sentenced to life imprisonment and other long-term inmates will be facilitated to keep their wives with them for three days once in every quarter of a year. The facility shall be provided subject to verification of the good conduct of the prisoner and their family members by the jail authorities, the District administration and the concerned police.

== Prison industries ==
The following prison industries are functioning in the jail to train the convicted prisoners in various trades and handicrafts so that they can earn a living after their release, utilise prison labour for the profit of the state exchequer, and keep the prisoners busy in useful tasks.

- Jail Warden Uniform Tailoring / Stitching Unit
- Prisoner Chadar Weaving Unit
- Hospital Bed Sheet Weaving Unit
- Hospital Patients' Blanket Weaving Unit
- Carpet Knitting Unit
- Phenyle Manufacturing Unit

There are 1,826 convicted prisoners at the jail, of which 428 have been sentenced to death. Of the 1,082 prisoners under trial, 682 are employed in prison industry.

== Gallery ==
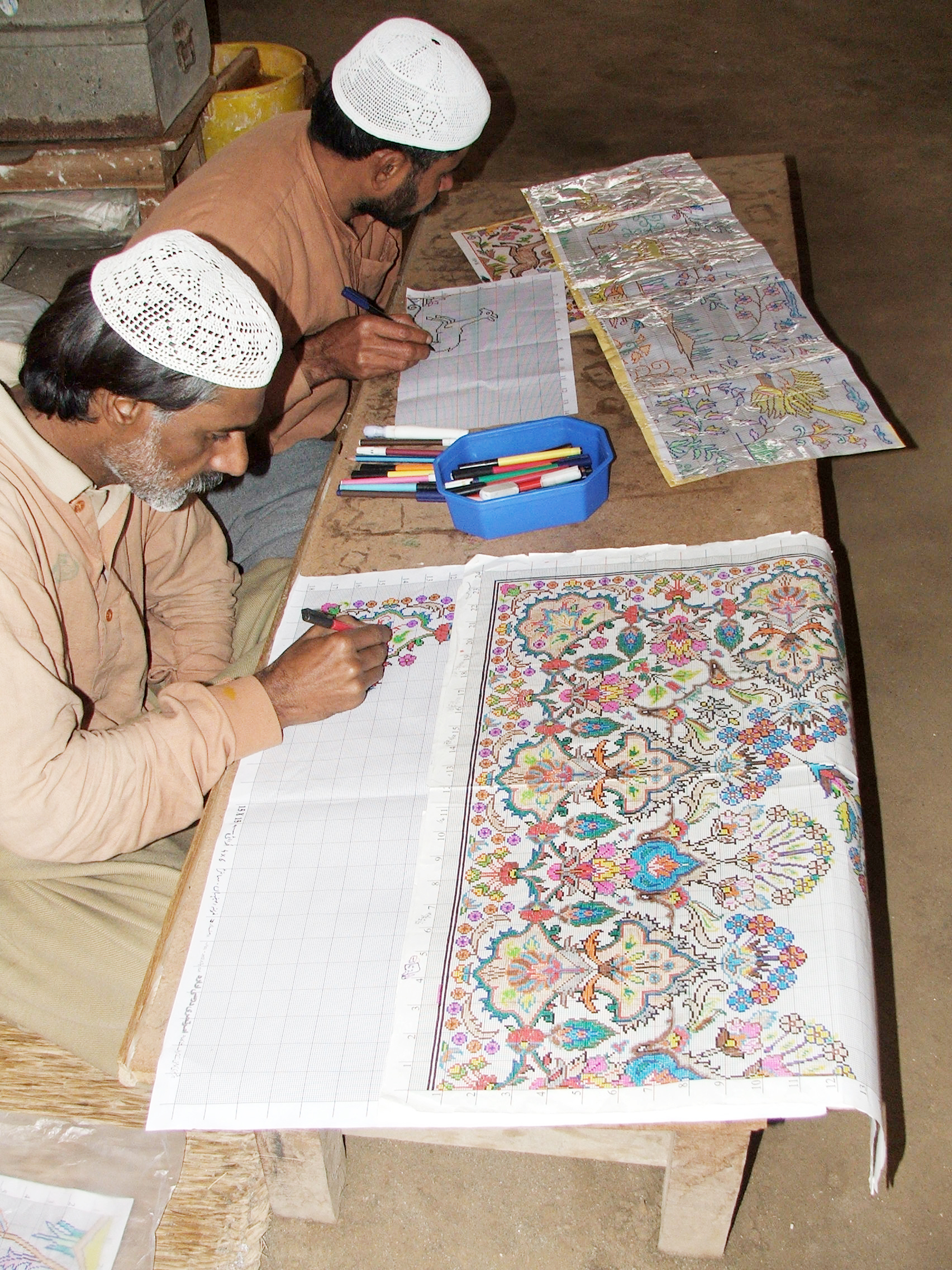
Central Jail Faisalabad offers recreational programmes for prisoners – Two convict artists busy in drawing designs of carpets on graph papers at Industrial Workshops of the jail, in 2010

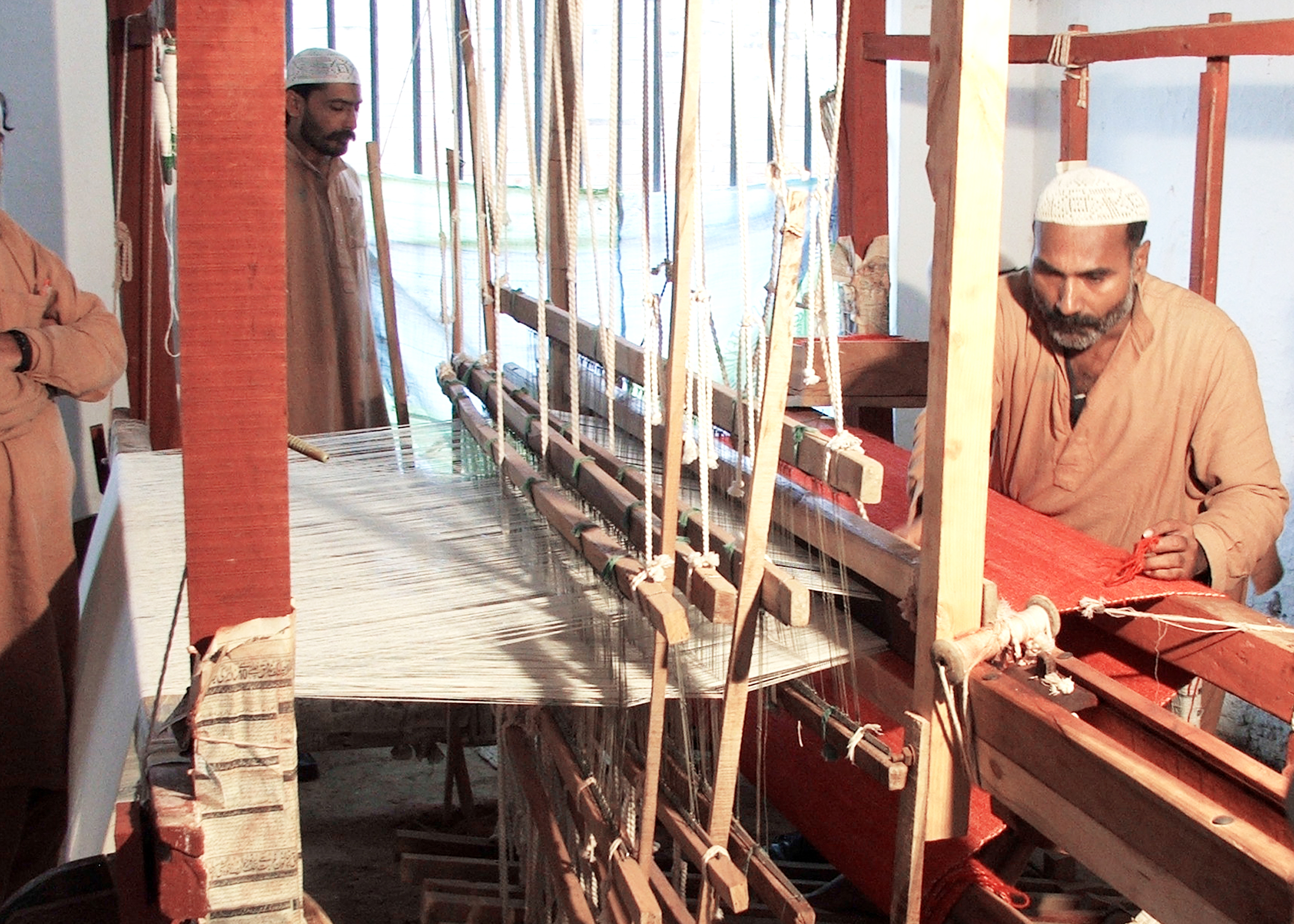
A convicted prisoner trained as a weaver during confinement weaving a red blanket used in Jail Hospitals on a traditional manual loom in 2010.

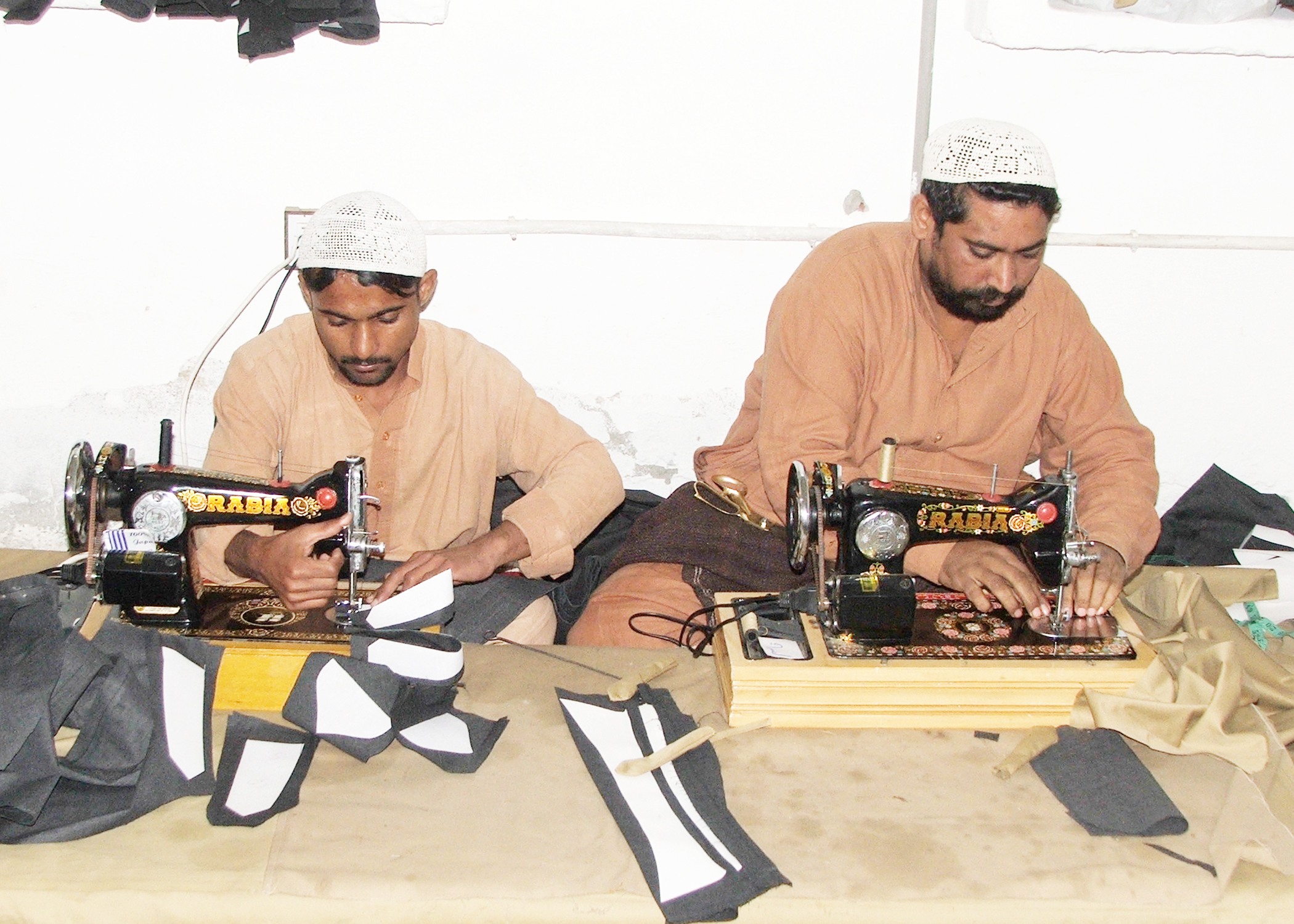
Convicted prisoners learning the art of tailoring and stitching the clothes during confinement

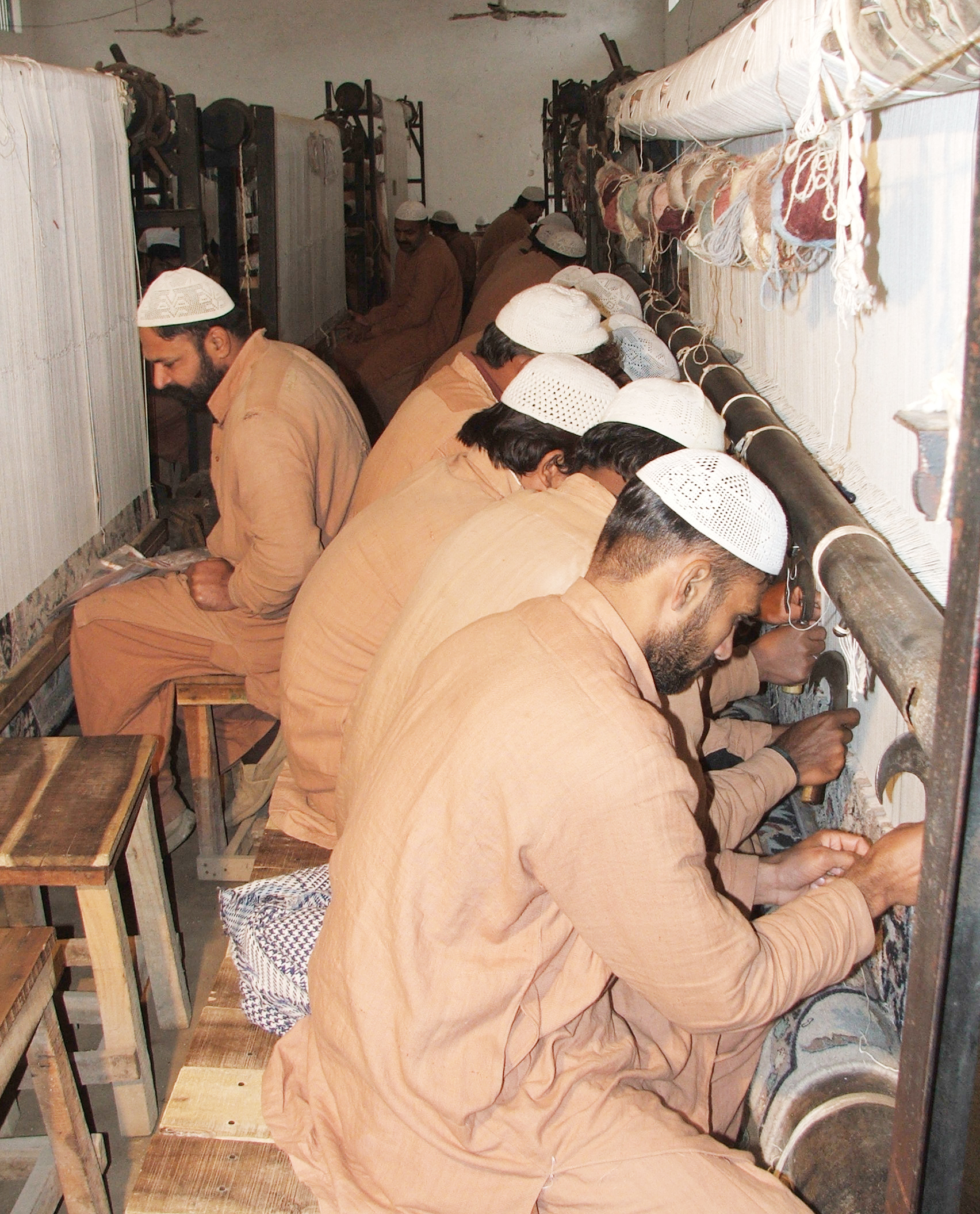
Convicted prisoners busy in knitting Persian designs' carpets in the carpet industry of the jail in 2010

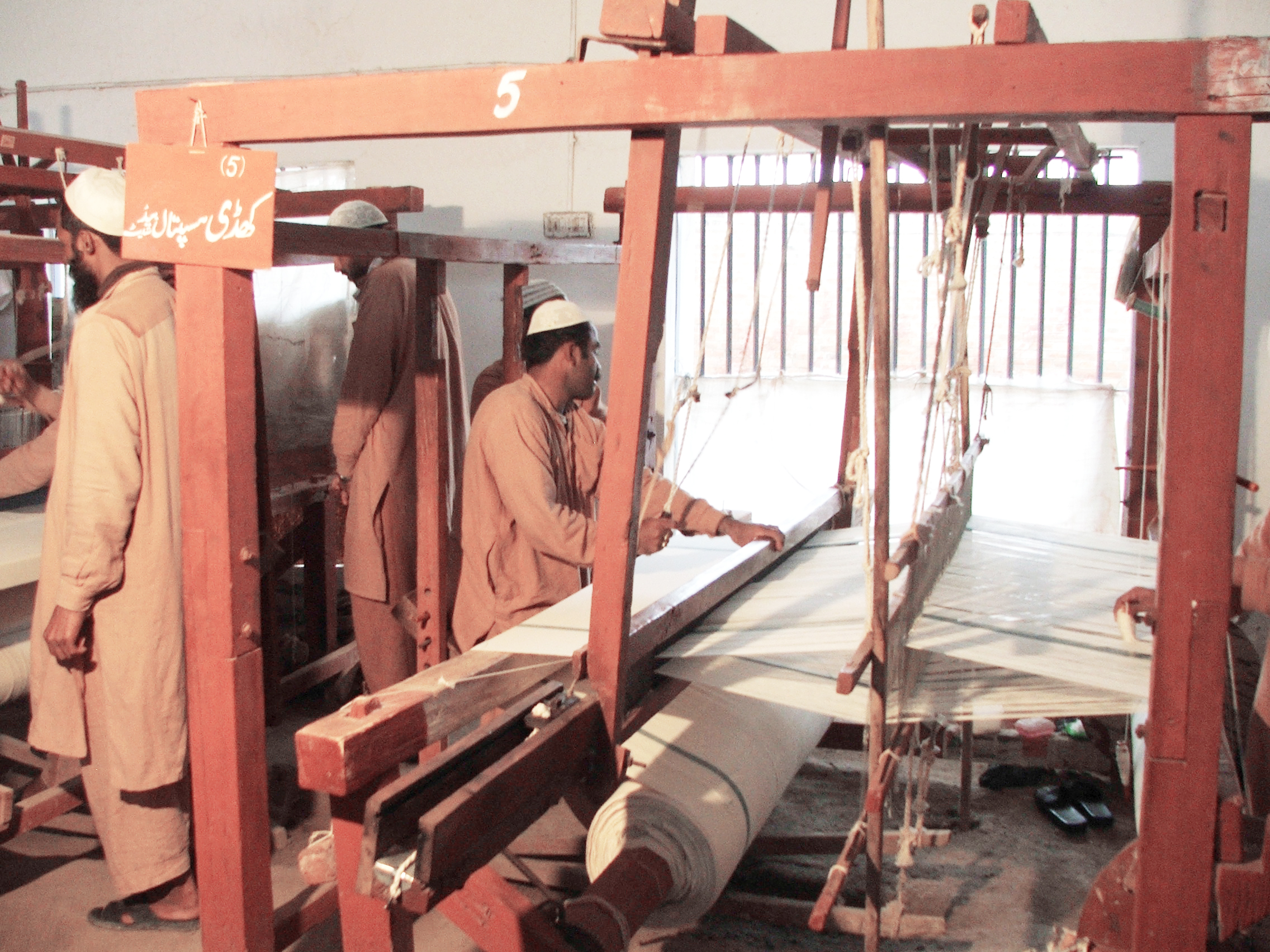
Convict weaver busy in weaving a hospital bed sheet on a traditional manual loom in the industrial workshops of the jail, in 2010

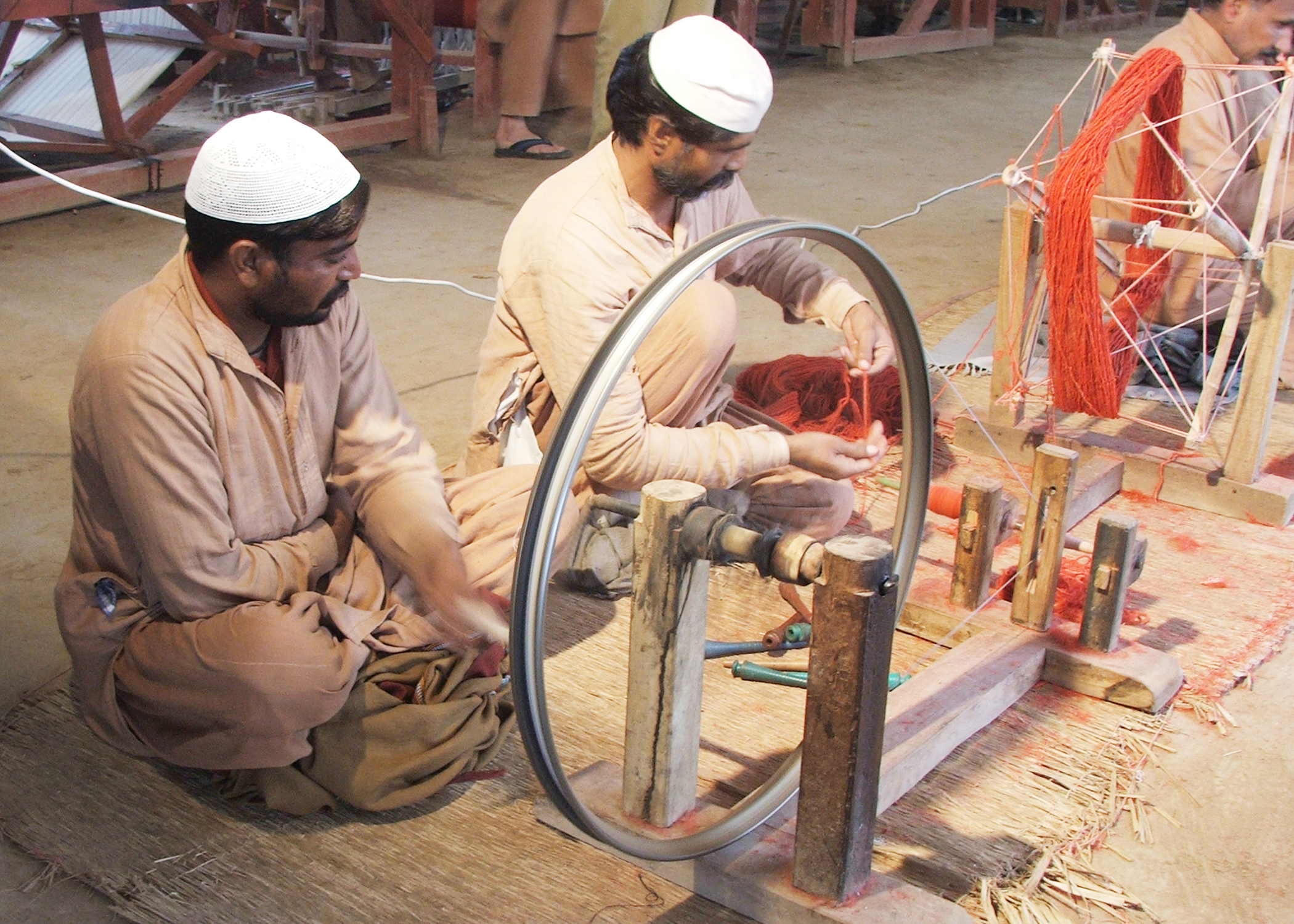
Correctional Activities in Central Jail Faisalabad, Pakistan in 2010 – Convicted prisoners working on a traditional manual Charkha

== See also ==
- Government of Punjab, Pakistan
- Headquarter Jail
- National Academy for Prisons Administration
- Prison Officer
- Punjab Prisons (Pakistan)
