= Kot Lakhpat Jail =

Prison in Lahore, Punjab, Pakistan

Coordinates: 31°26′48″N 74°20′07″E

Central Jail Lahore
- Interactive map of Central Jail Lahore
- Location: Lahore, Punjab, Pakistan
- Security class: Maximum
- Capacity: 4000
- Opened: 1965
- Managed by: Government of Punjab, Pakistan
- Director: Ijaz Asghar

Notable prisoners
- Zulfikar Ali Bhutto; Sardar Bhagat Singh; Rasool Bux Palijo; Javed Iqbal; Yusuf Kazzab; Nawaz Sharif; Imran Khan; Jatindra Nath Das; Sukhdev Thapar; Saad Hussain Rizvi; Hafiz Saeed

Kot Lakhpat Jail, officially known as Central Jail Lahore, is a prison located at Kot Lakhpat in Lahore, Punjab, Pakistan.

The jail houses more than four times the 4,000-prisoner capacity it was built for.

== History ==
Some prisoners died in the prison in the past, including Indian prisoner Sarabjit Singh, who was convicted of terrorism.

== Notable prisoners ==
- Bhagat Singh
- Sarabjit Singh
- Rasool Bux Palijo
- Zulfikar Ali Bhutto
- Javed Iqbal
- Yusuf Kazzab
- Nawaz Sharif, imprisoned in 2018 after conviction in Panama Papers case
- Jatindra Nath Das
- Saad Hussain Rizvi
- Hafiz Saeed
- Imran Khan, imprisoned in 2023 after conviction in Cypher No. I-0678

== See also ==
- Headquarter Jail
