= National Academy for Prisons Administration =

Pakistani government institution

- Abbreviation: NAPA
- Legal status: Government Institution
- Purpose: Training of Prisons Staff
- Headquarters: Ministry of Interior
- Location: Lahore
- Members: Prisons Staff in all provinces of Pakistan
- Director General: Dr. Kamran Afzal Cheema
- Main organ: Government of Pakistan
- Parent organization: Ministry of Interior
- Website: www.napa.gov.pk

National Academy for Prisons Administration (NAPA), formerly Central Jail Staff Training Institute (CJSTI) (Urdu: قومی درسگاہ برائے تنظیمِ زنداں), is a Federal Government training institute for prison staff of all four provinces of Pakistan. It operates under the Ministry of the Interior.

== Function ==
The National Academy for Prisons Administration (NAPA) works to fulfill Function No.28 of Rules of Business of the Interior Division read with SL#16 of the Federal Legislative List. It is the only National Level Academy that imparts basic and professional training to prison staff and reclamation personnel (Probation & Parole Officers).

Judges, Prosecutors and Police Officers participate in workshops/seminars/symposia on specialized subjects.

The Academy fulfills the requirements of the United Nations Geneva Convention known as Standard Minimum Rules for Treatment of Prisoners 1955, for concerted training of prison/reclamation.

The Academy provides technical and professional training from warders to jail superintendents.

== History ==
As a sequel to the 1973 Jail Reform Conference, the Central Jail Staff Training Institute established in October 1974. It was upgraded to the National Academy for Prisons Administration (NAPA) in October 1974.

== Roles ==
The major role is to provide academic and practical/professional training to all officers and lower staff of the prison department. Its objectives are:

- Progressive professional training of prison officers and ranks
- Specialized training of senior prison staff in important disciplines, including human rights
- Physical training of prison staff, ensuring physical fitness and preparation of officers/ranks in skills to handle crisis situations
- Training of Probation and Parole Officers in rehabilitation and correction techniques
- Orientation of officers of other departments relevant to prison affairs
- Research and development in prison management
- Computer training
- Advise Ministry of Interior and prison departments on legal and administrative matters
- Maintain a database to provide information regarding prisons and all other related fields to assist in policy planning
- Coordinate all training and other affairs of prisons with the Prisons Departments on behalf of the Ministry of Interior.
- Advise prison staff on matters pertaining to psycho-social, and environmental aspects of inmates and providing corrective counseling
- Act as a focal point, collecting, collating and updating prisons/prisoners data
- Attend the National Assembly to answer prison-related questions
- Advise universities on psycho-social and legal aspects

== See also ==
- Government of Pakistan
- Punjab Prisons (Pakistan)
- National Police Academy of Pakistan
- Central Jail Faisalabad
- Central Jail Lahore
- Central Jail Mianwali
- Prison Officer
- Headquarter Jail
- Central Jail Rawalpindi
- District Jail Rawalpindi
- Probation in Pakistan
