= Headquarter Jail =

The term Headquarter Jail or Headquarter Prison means one of the Jails (usually a Central Jail) in a Circle (a group of prisons) in any province of Pakistan, whose Superintendent or Officer-in-Charge is assigned with the administrative and financial powers of appointment, transfer and promotion of warders for all jails falling in the said Circle. In Punjab (Pakistan), the said powers have been shifted to the regional commanders i.e. Deputy Inspector General of Prisons of the region after creation of four regions of Jails in the province and posts of the regional commanders in the year 2004.

== See also ==
- Punjab Prisons (Pakistan)
- National Academy for Prisons Administration
