= Murder of Becky O'Connell =

Murder and rape of young American girl

Becky O'Connell
- Born: Rebecca M. O'Connell; September 10, 1980; Glens Falls, New York, U.S.
- Died: May 8, 1990 (aged 9); Lincoln County, South Dakota, U.S.
- Cause of death: Severed jugular vein and stab wounds
- Mother: Tina Curl

Becky O'Connell (September 10, 1980 – May 8, 1990) was an American nine-year-old girl who was raped and murdered in South Dakota in May 1990. She was abducted while walking home from a Sioux Falls neighborhood convenience store on the evening of May 8, 1990, by Donald Eugene Moeller (August 5, 1952 – October 30, 2012), a 37-year-old man with a history of attempted sexual assaults who lived in the area. Moeller took O'Connell to a wooded area along the banks of the Big Sioux River east of Lake Alvin in Lincoln County. She was then raped, stabbed multiple times, and had her throat cut. O'Connell's naked body was found the following day.

Moeller evaded authorities for over nine months until he was apprehended in Tacoma, Washington. Moeller was extradited to South Dakota, found guilty, and sentenced to death. He remained on South Dakota's death row for over 20 years until he was executed by lethal injection on October 30, 2012. Moeller maintained his innocence throughout his time on death row before eventually confessing to the crime in the final months leading up to his execution. O'Connell's murder has been described as the most horrific crime in South Dakota state history.

== Murder ==
On the evening of May 8, 1990, nine-year-old Becky O'Connell disappeared from a Sioux Falls neighborhood convenience store where she had gone to buy candy and sugar to make lemonade at home. When she failed to return home, O'Connell's mother, Tina Curl, and stepfather, David M. Curl, along with several of their neighbors, began searching for O'Connell. After searching for an hour and coming up with no leads, they called the police. According to Tina, the police initially tried to blame both her and David for O'Connell's disappearance, asking them what they did to cause her to run away from home. David was questioned by police who also looked at whether O'Connell may have been abused.

The following morning, O'Connell's naked body was found in a wooded area along the banks of the Big Sioux River near Lake Alvin in Lincoln County. An autopsy determined that she had been raped and her cause of death was confirmed as a severed jugular vein. No attempt had been made to conceal O'Connell's body or clothes and there was no murder weapon found at the crime scene.

== Investigation ==
In the days after O'Connell's murder, police continued to search for her killer. One lead caught the eye of Detective Mike Larsen, who noticed a man named Donald Moeller, who had a long criminal history, lived near the area where O'Connell had been abducted from. Moeller was brought in for questioning and agreed to give police a blood sample. Larsen took Moeller back home and noticed his truck was covered in mud. The truck was similar to witness descriptions of a vehicle that had been seen in the area where O'Connell's body was found. Additionally, heavy rains had occurred on the night of O'Connell's death and the crime scene had been covered in mud and dirt as a result.

Moeller was considered a strong suspect following the interview, so police obtained a search warrant for his home. However, by the time they arrived, Moeller had already fled the area. Police found further evidence at his home, including a copy of the Argus Leader opened to an article about police taking blood samples for male suspects in O'Connell's murder. They also discovered Moeller had returned his truck to the person he had bought it from.

Moeller evaded authorities for over nine months until he was apprehended in Tacoma, Washington. In January 1991, Moeller was charged with possession of stolen property. However, Moeller used an alias and served only a month in jail before being released. It was not until after his release that the Tacoma Police Department realized his true identity. A routine FBI check of Moeller's fingerprints taken by the Tacoma Police Department revealed he was wanted in South Dakota on an assault charge unconnected with O'Connell's murder. In February 1991, the Tacoma Police Department picked him up again and he waived extradition to South Dakota.

== Trials of Moeller ==
On July 31, 1991, Moeller was indicted by a Lincoln County grand jury on one count of first degree rape, one count of felony murder, and one count of first-degree murder. On July 27, 1992, Moeller's trial began in Yankton County with the jury being selected. On September 1, 1992, a jury found Moeller guilty of raping and murdering Becky O'Connell. Two days later, the jury returned its verdict with a sentence of death. It marked the first time a death sentence was handed out in South Dakota after a bill was signed in 1979 to revive South Dakota's death penalty. Moeller had been offered a chance to plead guilty in exchange for a life sentence, but turned down the offer.

On May 22, 1996, Moeller's death sentence was overturned by the South Dakota Supreme Court on the grounds that the jury's decision had been unfairly swayed by Moeller's past crimes, which had been revealed at his trial. The justices found that the jury should never have heard the evidence, as it was unrelated to O'Connell's murder. At his trial, three people testified that Moeller had attempted to rape them in the past. In 1973, Moeller allegedly abducted and attempted to rape 21-year-old Carolyn Beshaw in South Dakota. When Beshaw said she would rather die than let Moeller rape her, Moeller released her. In 1979, Moeller allegedly slashed a 13-year-old boy named Kenneth Moore with a knife while attempting to rape him in Wyoming. In 1990, Moeller allegedly slashed a woman named Tracy Warner while attempting to rape her in South Dakota in 1990.

In April 1997, Moeller was tried again in Rapid City. He was offered another chance to plead guilty, but again rejected the offer. On May 23, 1997, a Pennington County jury found Moeller should be sentenced to death once again for the rape and murder of Becky O'Connell. On June 4, Moeller was formally sentenced to death and returned to South Dakota's death row.

== Execution of Moeller ==
Donald Moeller
- Born: Donald Eugene Moeller; August 5, 1952; Sioux Valley Hospital, Sioux Falls, South Dakota, U.S.
- Died: October 30, 2012 (aged 60); South Dakota State Penitentiary, Sioux Falls, South Dakota, U.S.
- Cause of death: Execution by lethal injection
- Convictions: First degree murder First degree rape Aggravated assault (3 counts); Third degree burglary Grand larceny Grand theft Escape
- Penalty: Death (June 4, 1997)

Details
- Victims: Becky O'Connell, 9
- Date: May 8, 1990
- Locations: Sioux Falls, South Dakota; Lincoln County, South Dakota
- Imprisoned at: South Dakota State Penitentiary

Moeller remained on South Dakota's death row for over 20 years and maintained his innocence throughout. Moeller continued to appeal and fight his sentence. However, on July 18, 2012, Moeller publicly confessed to raping and murdering O'Connell for the first time. He had fought his conviction and sentence for years but in July 2012, Moeller said he was ready to die and accept the consequence of his actions. Dismissing claims by Moeller's lawyers that he was mentally incompetent to waive his remaining appeals, Moeller told a judge that he did not want to be executed, but said that he deserved to die for what he had done and that continuing to fight his death sentence would be a waste of time.

In July 2012, a South Dakota circuit court judge set the execution window for Moeller to occur between October 28 and November 3, 2012. The exact date and time of the execution was up to prison officials.

Despite stopping his appeals, several motions were filed on Moeller's behalf to stop the execution from going ahead. A federal judge dismissed a pending suit challenging South Dakota's execution protocol after Moeller said he did not want to be a part of it. A judge also dismissed a motion filed by a woman with family ties to Moeller who argued after decades in solitary confinement that Moeller was not capable of voluntarily choosing to die.

On October 30, 2012, Moeller was executed by lethal injection at the South Dakota State Penitentiary in Sioux Falls. He was pronounced dead at 10:24 p.m. Moeller's last meal consisted of scrambled eggs, link sausage, tater tots, and coffee. When asked if he had any last words, Moeller responded, "No, sir." After a brief pause, he asked, "They're my fan club?" Initially, there was confusion as to what Moeller meant and who he was addressing. It was later revealed by the South Dakota Department of Corrections that several witnesses had reported hearing voices or audible noises as well as sounds of cheering as Moeller made his last statement. Department of Corrections staff members later reported that they could distinguish the voices and sounds of cheering coming from other inmates in a nearby housing unit. It is believed Moeller's reference to a "fan club" was intended for the other inmates making the noise. O'Connell's mother later commented that she was pleased that the last thing Moeller heard was other inmates cheering his execution. Moeller was 60 when he was executed.

Moeller's execution came just two weeks after the execution of Eric Robert, another South Dakota death row inmate, who was convicted of murdering corrections officer Ronald Johnson during a failed prison escape attempt. The executions marked a rarity in South Dakota as Moeller's execution was the second execution in just one month in South Dakota, which was an unusual surge for the state, as it had carried out only two other executions since 1913: George Sitts in 1947 and Elijah Page in 2007.

O'Connell's mother, Tina Curl, moved to Lake Luzerne, New York after her daughter's death. Wanting to witness Moeller's execution, she appealed for help in covering the costs to afford the 1,400-mile trip from New York to South Dakota to witness the execution. Both Curl, and O'Connell's stepfather, David, drove from Lake Luzerne to witness the execution. After the execution, Tina Curl showed pictures of O'Connell at age nine followed by a framed artist's rending of what O'Connell would have looked like in 2012 at age 32. According to O'Connell's mother, a group of inmates serving life sentences in South Dakota established a scholarship fund in memory of Becky O'Connell.

== See also ==
- Capital punishment in South Dakota
- Capital punishment in the United States
- List of kidnappings (1990–1999)
- List of people executed in South Dakota
- List of people executed in the United States in 2012

Executions carried out in South Dakota
Preceded by Eric Robert October 15, 2012	Donald Moeller; October 30, 2012	Succeeded by Rodney Berget October 29, 2018
Executions carried out in the United States
Preceded by Bobby Hines – Texas October 24, 2012	Donald Moeller – South Dakota; October 30, 2012	Succeeded by Donnie Roberts – Texas October 31, 2012
