= Larisa =

Larisa may refer to:

== Places in Greece ==
=== Modern ===
- Larissa, capital and largest city of the Thessaly region in Greece

=== Ancient ===
- Larisa (Argos), ancient and medieval acropolis of Argos, Greece
- Larisa (Caria), town of ancient Caria, Turkey
- Larisa (Ionia), town of ancient Ionia, Turkey
- Larisa (Lydia), town of ancient Lydia, Turkey
- Larisa (Troad), ancient Greek city in the south-west of the Troad region of Anatolia, Turkey
- Larisa (given name), female given name of Greek origin

== Other ==
- Larisa subsolana, the sole species of the moth genus Larisa
- Larisa, a 1980 short film directed by Elem Klimov

== See also ==
- Larissa (disambiguation)
