= Larissa (given name) =

- Pronunciation: /ləˈrɪsə/ lə-RIH-sə; Greek: [ˈlarisa] Russian: [ɫɐˈrʲisə]
- Gender: female
- Language: Catalan, Corsican, Croatian, Czech, Danish, Dutch, English, Finnish, French, German, Icelandic, Indonesian, Irish, Italian, Norwegian, Polish, Portuguese, Spanish, Slovak, Slovenian, Swedish
- Name day: March 26

Origin
- Derivation: Lara
- Meaning: Citadel

Other names
- Alternative spelling: Larisa (given name)

Larissa (Ancient Greek: Λάρισα) is a female given name of Greek origin that is common in Eastern European nations of Orthodox church heritage. It is derived either from Larissa, a nymph in Greek mythology who was a daughter of Pelasgus, or from the name of the ancient city of Larissa in Greece which meant "citadel" or "fortress" in a now extinct Pre-Greek substrate language.

The name is spelled Λάρισα in modern Greek and Лариса in Cyrillic, and based on either may also be Latinised as Larisa. It is used in Russian, Ukrainian, Romanian, and Latvian languages. In 2009, Larisa was the 21st most common name for girls born in Romania.

A Russian short form is Lara, made famous through Boris Pasternak's novel Doctor Zhivago (1957).

Notable people with the name include:

- Saint Larissa (died c.375), early martyr
- Larissa Adler Lomnitz (1932–2019), French-born Chilean-Mexican social anthropologist
- Larissa Anderson (born 1977), Australian basketball player
- Larissa Araújo (born 1992), Brazilian handball player
- Larissa Barata (born 1987), Brazilian rhythmic gymnast
- Larissa Behrendt (born 1969), Australian legal academic, writer, filmmaker and Indigenous rights advocate
- Larissa Bertényi (born 2000), Swiss hurdler
- Larissa Burak (born 1968), Ukrainian-Australian bandurist and mezzo-soprano singer
- Larissa Carvalho (born 1985), Brazilian tennis player
- Larissa Carvalho (rugby union) (born 2003), Brazilian rugby sevens player
- Larissa Chouaib (born 1966), Lebanese table tennis player
- Larissa Cieslak (born 1987), Brazilian swimmer
- Larissa Crummer (born 1996), Australian footballer
- Larissa de Macedo Machado (Anitta) (born 1993), Brazilian singer and songwriter
- Larissa Dias (born 1998), Brazilian jiu-jitsu competitor from Brazil
- Larissa Eifler (born 1999), German fencer
- Larissa FastHorse, American dramatist
- Larissa Fiallo (born 1983), Miss Dominican Republic in the 2004 Miss Universe pageant
- Larissa França (born 1982), Brazilian beach volleyball player
- Larissa Franklin (born 1993), Canadian softball player
- Larissa Grunig (born 1946), American public relations theorist
- Larissa Henwood (born 1994), Brazil international rugby union player
- Larissa Iapichino (born 2002), Italian female long jumper
- Larissa Inangorore (born 1984), Burundian swimmer
- Larissa Ione, American writer
- Larissa Kalaus (born 1996), Croatian handball player
- Larissa Kapitonova (born 1970), Russian footballer
- Larissa Kaur (born 1941), Estonian ballerina
- Larissa Keat (born 1989), Swiss-American actress, director, and performer
- Larissa Kelly (born 1980), American scholar and Jeopardy! winner
- Larissa Kojoue, Cameroonian academic and activist
- Larissa Kosorukova (born 1973), Russian-born Israeli sprint canoer
- Larissa Lai (born 1967), Canadian writer, critic and professor
- Larissa Lam, American talk show host and music executive
- Larissa Laskin, Canadian actress
- Larissa Lezhnina (born 1969), Russian ballet dancer
- Larissa Loyva, Canadian musician
- Larissa Luz (born 1987), Brazilian singer-songwriter
- Larissa MacFarquhar (born 1968), American writer
- Larissa Maciel (born 1977), Brazilian actress
- Larissa Manoela (born 2000), Brazilian actress and singer
- Larissa-Antonia Marolt (born 1992), Austrian fashion model
- Larissa Marolt (born 1992), Austrian fashion model and actress
- Larissa Meek (born 1978), American model and beauty queen
- Larissa Meijer (born 1990), Dutch field hockey player
- Larissa Mondrus (born 1943), German stage name of Soviet expatriate singer
- Larissa Nüsser (born 2000), Dutch handball player
- Larissa Oliveira (born 1993), Brazilian swimmer
- Larissa Zaleska Onyshkevych (born 1935), Ukrainian scholar
- Larissa Pacheco (born 1994), Brazilian mixed martial arts fighter
- Larissa Pauluis (born 1980), Belgian dressage rider
- Larissa Pimenta (born 1999), Brazilian judoka
- Larissa Queiroz (born 1984), Brazilian actress
- Larissa Reissner (1895–1926), Russian writer and revolutionary
- Larissa Riquelme (born 1985), Paraguayan model and actress
- Larissa Robitschko (born 1998), Beauty pageant titleholder
- Larissa Rodrigues (born 2004), Brazilian Paralympic swimmer
- Larissa Rusek (born 2005), Austrian footballer
- Larissa Schuster (born 1960), American convicted murderer and former biochemist
- Larissa Tago Takeda, Japanese-Brazilian voice actress
- Larissa Tudor (died 1926), woman rumored to be Grand Duchess Tatiana of Russia
- Larissa Volokhonsky (born 1945), Russian-born translator
- Larissa Werbicki (born 1996), Canadian rower
- Larissa Zamotina (born 1967), Russian former competitive figure skater

== See also ==
- Larissa (disambiguation)
