= Murder of Ronald Johnson =

2011 murder of a corrections officer in South Dakota

Ronald "R.J." Johnson
- Ronald Johnson, who was murdered in 2011
- Born: Ronald Johnson; April 12, 1948; Flandreau, Moody County, South Dakota, U.S.
- Died: April 12, 2011 (aged 63); South Dakota State Penitentiary, South Dakota, U.S.
- Cause of death: Fatal head wounds
- Resting place: Lone Rock Cemetery
- Other names: Ron Johnson; R.J.
- Occupation: Corrections officer
- Employer: South Dakota Department of Corrections (1988 – 2011)
- Known for: Murder victim
- Spouse: Lynette Johnson
- Children: Toni Schafer (daughter)

On April 12, 2011, at the South Dakota State Penitentiary in Sioux Falls, 63-year-old corrections officer Ronald Johnson was attacked and murdered by two inmates who were in the midst of a prison escape. They were later apprehended by other correctional officers while attempting to disguise themselves. The two prisoners, Eric Robert and Rodney Berget, were charged with murdering Johnson and were sentenced to death by the courts of South Dakota. Robert, who waived his right to appeal, was executed on October 15, 2012, while Berget, whose brother was sentenced to death in Oklahoma in 1987, was executed six years later on October 29, 2018, after also ending his appeals. A third prisoner, Michael Nordman, who provided the murder weapons, was sentenced to life in prison after pleading guilty to his role in the murder.

== Murder ==
On the morning of April 12, 2011, the day of his 63rd birthday, corrections officer Ronald (RJ) Johnson, who had been on the job for 23 years and was close to retiring, was working in one of the two Pheasantland Industries (PI 1) shop buildings which are state owned, but private operated and located within the prison compound of South Dakota State Penitentiary, where inmates work on upholstery, printing, signs, furniture, and other projects. Johnson, who was alone in the shop, was attacked by two prisoners, Eric Robert and Rodney Berget, who bludgeoned Johnson severely with a pipe, and wrapped his head in plastic wrap. The attack on Johnson resulted in his death; an autopsy result revealed that Johnson suffered at least three fatal head wounds and multiple fractures to his hands and arms, which were consistent with defensive injuries.

At that time, Berget was serving two life sentences for kidnapping and attempted murder, while Robert was serving a sentence of 80 years for kidnapping. Both men, classified as maximum-security inmates, plotted to escape from prison since August 2010. Part of their plan was to masquerade as corrections officers by using the uniforms of the correctional staff to leave the facility. The two men, both aged 49, received the help of 47-year-old Michael Nordman, a convicted rapist who was serving a life term. Nordman provided the two men with the weapons they needed to facilitate their escape, specifically the pipe used to bludgeon Johnson to death and the plastic wrap used to cover his head. Robert and Berget waited until the shop was empty and Johnson was left alone. When that happened, they took the opportunity to attack and kill him.

After murdering Johnson and hiding his body, Robert put on Johnson's uniform and Berget climbed into a box placed on a cart. Posing as a corrections officer, Robert pushed the cart out of the shop and headed toward the vehicle gate sally port also known as West Gate of the prison compound. Jodi Hall, a female Corrections Officer who was working in the West Gate overpass observed that Robert had not swiped his identification card and asked him to identify himself. Although Robert tried to get away with it and introduced himself with a false identity, the plot was eventually discovered. An additional Corrections Corporal, Matthew Freeburg, was called to investigate. As Freeburg arrived, Robert began attacking him and Berget came out of the box he was concealed in to join in the assault. At one point the offenders tried to scale the exterior West Gate sally port gate in an attempt to climb out. Robert and Berget eventually surrendered and were subdued by the correctional officers.

The body of Johnson was eventually discovered inside the shop where he was attacked and murdered. Berget, Robert, and Nordman were soon charged with the first-degree murder of Ronald Johnson. Under South Dakota law, first-degree murder carries either the death penalty or life imprisonment.

== Perpetrators ==
=== Eric Donald Robert ===
Eric Donald Robert
- Born: May 31, 1962; Massachusetts, U.S.
- Died: October 15, 2012 (aged 50); South Dakota State Penitentiary, South Dakota, U.S.
- Cause of death: Execution by lethal injection
- Motive: Prison escape
- Convictions: First degree murder Kidnapping
- Penalty: Kidnapping; 80 years' imprisonment Murder; Death

Details
- Victims: Ronald Johnson, 63 (deceased); Unnamed female kidnapping victim
- Date: July 24, 2005 (kidnapping); April 12, 2011 (murder)
- Locations: Black Hawk (2005); South Dakota State Penitentiary (2011)
- Imprisoned at: South Dakota State Penitentiary

==== Robert's early life ====
Born on May 31, 1962, in Massachusetts, Eric Donald Robert grew up in Wisconsin with his mother and sister, after his father left them when Robert was six months old. While his mother worked three jobs and studied for a college degree, Robert took on a father-like role in the family and took care of them. He excelled in school, graduating in his class at Hayward High School in 1980. He also completed a degree at the University of Wisconsin-Superior after he majored in biology, in addition to a minor in chemistry.

During his adulthood, Robert worked as a wastewater treatment supervisor for the city of Superior in 2000. Although he was known to be getting along well with his co-workers in his job, Robert's ex-girlfriends from previous relationships described him as aggressive and mean, and some of them were previously abused by Robert.

On July 24, 2005, Robert kidnapped a woman near Black Hawk. For this offense, Robert was convicted and sentenced to 80 years imprisonment. He was transferred to South Dakota State Penitentiary to serve his jail term. At the time of Johnson's murder, Robert had served six years of his sentence.

==== Robert's trial ====
On October 27, 2011, Robert was sentenced to death after he pleaded guilty to murder and chose to forgo the option of sentencing by a jury. Robert reportedly told a judge to hand him a death sentence as he would kill more people if he did not get the death penalty, stating that his only regret was that he did not use the pipe that he killed Johnson with to murder the officer who caught him.

In sentencing Robert to death, Second Circuit Judge Bradley Zell stated that there was no possibility for Robert to be rehabilitated and his brutal attack on Johnson arose from "extreme anger to the point of hatred." Attorney General Marty Jackley told the press that the state sought the death penalty based on five aggravating factors in this case, including the facts that the victim was a corrections officer, the manner of the victim's death and antecedents of the offenders, and the conduct of Robert showed that the death penalty, which was reserved for the most heinous crimes, was justified in Robert's case.

=== Rodney Scott Berget ===
Rodney Scott Berget
- Born: May 15, 1962; South Dakota, U.S.
- Died: October 29, 2018 (aged 56); South Dakota State Penitentiary, South Dakota, U.S.
- Cause of death: Execution by lethal injection
- Motive: Prison escape
- Convictions: First degree murder Kidnapping; Attempted murder
- Penalty: Kidnapping and attempted murder Life imprisonment (x2); Murder; Death

Details
- Victims: Ronald Johnson, 63 (deceased); Unnamed kidnapping victim
- Date: 2003 (kidnapping); April 12, 2011 (murder)
- Location: South Dakota (2003, 2011)
- Imprisoned at: South Dakota State Penitentiary

==== Berget's early life ====
Born on May 15, 1962, in South Dakota, Rodney Scott Berget was one of six children in his family. Berget's family, who made a living out of farming prior to his birth, was extremely poor and lived in the rural areas of the state. After the farm failed, the family moved to Aberdeen. Berget's parents, Benford and Rosemary Berget, divorced sometime in the 1970s, after the loss of the farm, the new city life, and the gradual abusive nature of Berget's father, who also turned to alcoholism, took a toll on their marriage. Berget and his siblings were also abused by their father from a young age.

During his adolescent years, Berget first went to prison after he committed theft. At age 25, in 1987, while serving a jail term for grand theft and prison escape, Berget and five other inmates broke out of the South Dakota State Penitentiary. He remained on the run for a month before being re-captured.

Berget was not the first person in his family to face the death penalty. In a separate case, Berget's brother, Roger Berget, was charged together with another man for the kidnapping and murder of schoolteacher Rick Patterson in Oklahoma in 1985. Roger and his co-accused Michael Smith were both sentenced to death in 1987. Roger was ultimately executed at age 39 on June 8, 2000, while Smith's death sentence was commuted to life without parole after an appeal in 1992. Berget himself was still incarcerated in South Dakota at the time of his brother's execution, and he grieved over the death of his brother. Berget was eventually released and would celebrate his 40th birthday in May 2002. According to Berget, it was the happiest moment of his life, which had been riddled with tragedy and darkness.

In 2003, Berget was arrested and convicted of kidnapping and attempted murder, and he was sentenced to double terms of life imprisonment. By the time he murdered Johnson, Berget had served eight years at South Dakota State Penitentiary.

==== Berget's trial ====
Like Robert, Berget pleaded guilty to the charge of murdering Johnson, and a sentencing trial was conducted for him in early 2012. Several witnesses were called to testify about Berget's tragic childhood and dark past, and the defense implored the court to not impose the death sentence but opt for life imprisonment on humanitarian grounds.

On February 6, 2012, Berget was sentenced to death after the trial judge, Bradley Zell, rejected the defense's mitigation plea, stating that Berget's troubled childhood and other extenuating circumstances of his case were outweighed by the depravity of the crime.

=== Michael Joe Nordman ===
Michael Joe Nordman
- Born: September 27, 1964 (age 62); Sioux Falls, South Dakota, U.S.
- Motive: Prison escape
- Convictions: First degree murder (Aiding and abetting); Rape; Abuse of a minor
- Penalty: Life imprisonment (x2) (murder, rape and child abuse)

Details
- Victims: Ronald Johnson, 63 (deceased); Unnamed female minor victims
- Date: February 8, 1990 (rape); April 12, 2011 (murder)
- Location: South Dakota (1990, 2011)
- Imprisoned at: South Dakota State Penitentiary

==== Nordman's early life ====
Michael Nordman was born in Sioux Falls, South Dakota, on September 27, 1964. Little is known about Nordman's life before he turned to a life of crime in 1983, the same year when he was convicted and jailed for burglary. Four years later, in 1987, Nordman was charged with escape from legal custody and sent to prison a second time. However, his first major offense would take place three years later in 1990.

On February 8, 1990, Nordman entered the home of a ten-year-old girl in Sioux Falls, asking for gas for his car. The girl went to look for a gas can out of kindness, but Nordman took the opportunity to attack and rape the girl. Additionally, Nordman even slammed the head of the victim's sister into a car and subsequently fled the scene. A manhunt was conducted and a day later Nordman was arrested in Klondike, Iowa.

Nordman, who pleaded guilty but insane to two charges of rape and abuse of a minor in July 1990, was sentenced to life in prison. At the time of Johnson's murder in 2011, Nordman had already served 21 years behind bars at South Dakota State Penitentiary.

==== Nordman's trial ====
On February 8, 2012, 47-year-old Michael Nordman, who was not involved in the prison escape but had handed the murder weapons to both Berget and Robert, pleaded guilty to murder. The judge, Bradley Zell, sentenced Nordman to a second life term, which would run consecutively with the other life sentence he received in 1990 for the Sioux Falls child rape case. Reportedly, Johnson's widow, Lynette Johnson, was disappointed by the verdict of life in prison, as she wanted all three killers, including Nordman, to be sentenced to death, although both the prosecution and defense agreed that Nordman played a less culpable role compared to Robert and Berget.

== Executions of Robert and Berget ==
=== Robert (2012) ===
After he was sentenced to death, Eric Robert waived his right to appeal and asked to be executed immediately. Although there was a mandatory review process exhibited in all death penalty cases in South Dakota, Robert also applied to bypass the process itself. In August 2012, Robert's death sentence was ultimately upheld by the South Dakota Supreme Court, paving the way for a death warrant to be issued for Robert that same month. He was scheduled to be put to death in October of that same year. South Dakota Governor Dennis Daugaard also declined to stop the execution.

On October 15, 2012, 50-year-old Eric Donald Robert was executed via lethal injection at South Dakota State Penitentiary. Robert shared his last meal of ice cream with his lawyer and fasted for 40 hours for religious reasons prior to his execution. In his last words, Robert stated that he forgave the warden Douglas Weber for executing him before a single dose of pentobarbital was administered to him. He was pronounced dead at 10:24 p.m. Johnson's widow attended the execution and told reporters in a statement that she wanted people to remember "how kind, how wonderful and caring" her husband was. She supported Robert's execution.

Robert was the first death row inmate to be executed in South Dakota since the execution of Elijah Page in 2007. He was also the 17th person to be executed in South Dakota since 1877. Robert's execution took place just two weeks before Donald Moeller was scheduled to be executed for the 1990 kidnapping, rape, and murder of nine-year-old Becky O'Connell; Moeller's original execution date of October 28, 2012, was postponed by two days to October 30, 2012, and he was ultimately put to death on that date.

=== Berget (2018) ===
Unlike Robert, Rodney Berget continued to appeal against the death sentence for the following six years before it was ultimately carried out in 2018.

On January 3, 2013, Berget's death sentence was overturned by the South Dakota Supreme Court after they found that Berget's statements to a psychiatrist were not adequately considered by the trial judge during sentencing and a re-sentencing trial was ordered for Berget, who was once again sentenced to death in May 2013.

The second death sentence was subsequently upheld by the South Dakota Supreme Court in August 2014, and seven months later, the U.S. Supreme Court rejected Berget's final appeal against the death sentence. Berget was originally scheduled to be executed on May 3, 2015, but due to an appeal, the execution date was put on hold while the appeal was pending before the courts.

In 2016, Berget made another appeal against the death sentence, but he later applied to withdraw the appeal in spite of his lawyers' advice to not do so. Berget reportedly explained that he would not face the prospect of spending at least 30 years in prison under a life sentence and hoped to be executed soon.

In February 2018, Minnehaha County judge Doug Hoffman confirmed the death sentence of Berget after finding that he was eligible for a death sentence and did not have an intellectual disability.

Subsequently, Berget's death warrant was finalized in August 2018 and he was ordered to be executed between October 28 and November 3 of that same year. Without the consent of Berget, Juliet Yackel, a defense lawyer, filed appeals to the South Dakota Supreme Court to delay the execution on the grounds that Berget had an intellectual disability and asked that the death sentence should be prohibited in his case. However, the South Dakota Supreme Court rejected the appeal, and Yackel further appealed to the U.S. Supreme Court against this decision. However, hours before Berget was scheduled to be executed, the U.S. Supreme Court dismissed the appeal. In both of these appeals, Berget asked the court to reject Yackel's appeals as he wanted his death sentence to be quickly carried out as scheduled. Still, several opponents of capital punishment protested against the execution of Berget on the grounds that the death penalty was prohibited for intellectually disabled offenders and this exception should apply in the case of Berget.

On October 29, 2018, 56-year-old Rodney Berget was put to death via lethal injection at South Dakota State Penitentiary, six years after the execution of his accomplice Eric Robert. He became the fourth person to be executed in South Dakota since 2007 and the 19th person to have his death sentence carried out in South Dakota since 1877. The execution was originally supposed to be carried out in the afternoon at 1.30 p.m., but due to the appeals, the procedure did not commence and was instead delayed for five to six hours before it was finally carried out.

For his last meal, Berget ordered pancakes, waffles, maple syrup and butter, breakfast sausages, scrambled eggs, french fries, Pepsi, and Cherry Nibs licorice. Before receiving a single dose of pentobarbital, Berget reportedly made a joking remark, "Sorry for the delay, I got caught in traffic." About 12 minutes after the drug was administered to him, Berget was pronounced dead at 7:37 p.m.

In response to the death of Berget, Johnson's widow, who attended the execution with her daughter, son-in-law, and other family members, commented that her late husband died an extremely brutal death caused by bludgeoning and it was a "cruel and unusual punishment" compared to Berget's "peaceful" and "dignified" death. Toni Schafer, Johnson's daughter, stated that Berget "chose to be evil" and should pay the price for murdering her father.

== Aftermath ==
In 2014, when South Dakota's House committee debated on a bill to abolish the death penalty in South Dakota, Johnson's widow, Lynette Johnson, urged the committee to not remove the death penalty, stating that the death penalty should remain and be applied for the most dangerous of offenders for the protection of society. She stated that life imprisonment itself could not help protect her late husband from murder, as Michael Nordman, who was under a life term, provided the weapons for both Berget and Robert to kill Johnson. Former prosecutor Marty Jackley corroborated that both Berget and Robert were able to commit the murder despite being classified as maximum security inmates. In the end, the bill to repeal capital punishment was narrowly rejected by a majority vote of 7–6, allowing South Dakota to retain the death penalty, and it indirectly enabled Berget to be executed four years later for murdering Johnson. A second bill to repeal the death penalty in South Dakota was similarly rejected by the Senate State Affairs Committee in 2015.

In 2014, Lynette filed a wrongful death lawsuit against the South Dakota Department of Corrections, citing that the state prison officials' negligence of duty was part of the reason that led to the murder of her husband. Although this was dismissed by a federal judge, the court order also allowed the other claims raised in the lawsuit to be heard before the state courts.

In October 2015, Johnson was one of 53 law enforcement officers who were commemorated during an annual community event to remember these officers who died in the line of duty.

In October 2018, during the final week leading up to the execution of Berget, Lynette Johnson told a newspaper that she continued to struggle with sadness over the murder of her husband. She stated that life without a husband, father, and grandfather for her family was hard, and they continued to conduct birthday parties annually for Johnson on his birthday (also his death anniversary) every year. Lynette commented that while the family might not fully find closure with the execution of Berget, she was at peace with the knowledge that he would not harm another corrections officer or anyone else in society.

In December 2018, two months after Berget was put to death, Lynette filed a lawsuit to have her late husband's belongings and corrections officer uniform returned to her. The court ruled that the uniform was state property and belonged to the South Dakota Department of Corrections and did not return it to Lynette. She did manage to receive Johnson's other belongings.

In 2023, 11 years after Eric Robert was put to death, it was reported that during investigations into one of his previous crimes, Robert had been named a suspect behind the unsolved disappearance of a seven-year-old girl named Alexis Patterson in 2002. It was suspected that Robert had kidnapped Patterson, as a woman allegedly saw Robert saving a young African American girl from running across the road on the date of Patterson's disappearance; Patterson was also of African American descent. Robert had denied any involvement in Patterson's disappearance prior to his execution.

== See also ==
- Capital punishment in South Dakota
- List of people executed in South Dakota
- List of people executed in the United States in 2012
- List of people executed in the United States in 2018

Executions carried out in South Dakota
Preceded by Elijah Page July 11, 2007	Eric Donald Robert; October 15, 2012	Succeeded by Donald Eugene Moeller October 30, 2012
Executions carried out in the United States
Preceded by Jonathan Marcus Green – Texas October 10, 2012	Eric Donald Robert – South Dakota; October 15, 2012	Succeeded by Bobby Lee Hines – Texas October 24, 2012
Executions carried out in South Dakota
Preceded by Donald Eugene Moeller October 30, 2012	Rodney Scott Berget; October 29, 2018	Succeeded by Charles Russell Rhines November 4, 2019
Executions carried out in the United States
Preceded by Daniel Clate Acker – Texas September 27, 2018	Rodney Scott Berget – South Dakota; October 29, 2018	Succeeded by Edmund George Zagorski – Tennessee November 1, 2018
