= List of people executed in South Dakota (pre-1972) =

The following is a list of people executed by the U.S. state of South Dakota before capital punishment was resumed in the United States in 1976.

Fifteen people, all male, were executed in South Dakota during the pre-Furman era, fourteen by hanging and one by electrocution.

== List of people executed in South Dakota (pre-1972) ==
No.	Name	Race	Age	Sex	Date of execution	Method	County	Victim(s)	Governor	Ref.
1	Jack McCall	White	24	Male	March 1, 1877	Hanging	Yankton	Wild Bill Hickok	John L. Pennington	Ref.
2	Thomas Egan	White	47	Male	July 13, 1882	Hanging	Minnehaha	Mary Egan (Note: Wrongfully executed. The actual killer of Mary Egan, her daughter Catherine, made a verifiable deathbed confession to the murder in 1927. She admitted that she and her husband had conspired to frame Egan. Egan was posthumously pardoned in 1993.)	Nehemiah G. Ordway	
3	Brave Bear	Native American	—	Male	November 15, 1882	Hanging	Yankton	Joseph Johnson	Nehemiah G. Ordway	
4	James Leighton Gilmore	White	24	Male	December 15, 1882	Hanging	Lawrence	Bisente Ortez	Nehemiah G. Ordway	
5	John Benjamin Lehman	White	—	Male	February 19, 1892	Hanging	Custer	Constable James H. Burns	Arthur C. Mellette	
6	Nathaniel R. Thompson	White	62	Male	October 20, 1893	Hanging	Kingsbury	Electa Blighton	Charles H. Sheldon	
7	Jay Hicks	White	28	Male	November 15, 1894	Hanging	Meade	John Meyer	Charles H. Sheldon	
8	Chief Two Sticks	Native American	—	Male	December 28, 1894	Hanging	Lawrence	Four victims	Charles H. Sheldon	
9	Charles Brown	Black	54	Male	July 14, 1897	Hanging	Lawrence	Emma Frances Stone	Andrew E. Lee	
10	Ernest Loveswar	Native American	—	Male	September 19, 1902	Hanging	Meade	George Puck and George Ostrander	Charles N. Herreid	
11	Allen Walkingshield	Native American	—	Male	October 24, 1902	Hanging	Minnehaha (Federal)	Ghost-Faced Bear	Charles N. Herreid	
12	George Bear	Native American	41	Male	December 5, 1902	Hanging	Minnehaha (Federal)	C. Edward Taylor and John Shaw	Charles N. Herreid	
13	Emil Victor	White	19	Male	November 16, 1909	Hanging	Brown	4 victims (Note: Mr. and Mrs. James Christie, Mildred Christie, and Michael Ronayne)	Robert S. Vessey	
14	Joseph Richman	Black	—	Male	December 3, 1913	Hanging	Perkins	Ellen Fox and Mildred Fox	Frank M. Byrne	
15	George Sidney Sitts	White	33	Male	April 8, 1947	Electrocution	Lawrence	Special state agent Thomas Matthews (Note: Escaped convict from Minnesota, where he was serving a life sentence for the murder of Erik J. Johansson (49, white). Also murdered Butte County Sheriff Dave Malcolm (56, white).)	George T. Mickelson	

== Demographics ==
Race
White	8	53%
Native American	5	33%
Black	2	13%
Age
Unknown age	6	40%
17-19	1	7%
20-29	3	20%
30–39	1	7%
40–49	2	13%
50–59	1	7%
60–69	1	7%
Gender
Male	15	100%
Female	0	0%
Date of execution
1870–1879	1	7%
1880–1889	3	20%
1890–1899	5	33%
1900–1909	4	27%
1910–1919	1	7%
1940–1949	1	7%
Method
Hanging	14	93%
Electrocution	1	7%
Governor (Party)
John L. Pennington (R)	1	7%
Nehemiah G. Ordway (R)	3	20%
Arthur C. Mellette (R)	1	7%
Charles H. Sheldon (R)	3	20%
Andrew E. Lee (P)	1	7%
Charles N. Herreid (R)	3	20%
Robert S. Vessey (R)	1	7%
Frank M. Byrne (R)	1	7%
George T. Mickelson (R)	1	7%

== See also ==
- Capital punishment in the United States
- Capital punishment in South Dakota
- Lists of people executed in the United States
- List of people executed in South Dakota
