= Larissa (disambiguation) =

Larissa is the capital and largest city of Thessaly, Greece

Larissa may also refer to:

== Places ==
- Larissa (regional unit), an administrative division of Greece, centered on the city of Larissa

=== Greece ===
- Larissa Cremaste, an ancient Greek city in Achaea Phthiotis, in the south east of Thessaly
- Larissa (Thrace), an ancient Greek city in the region between the rivers Nestos and Hebros
- Larissa, ancient name of Gortyn, Crete

=== Anatolian ===
- Larissa (Troad), an ancient city near Troy.
- Larissa Phrikonis, an ancient Greek city in Aeolis, western Turkey

=== Syria ===
- Larissa, an ancient Greek city in Syria settled by colonists from the Thessalian city of the same name, now known as Shaizar

=== Others ===
- possibly an ancient name of Sveti Vlas, Bulgaria
- Larissa, Missouri, a ghost town in the United States
- Larissa, Texas, a community in the United States

== Given name ==
- Larissa (given name), a female first name, including a list of people named Larissa or Larisa
- Larissa (mythology), a nymph from Greek mythology

== Astronomy ==
- Larissa (moon), a moon of Neptune
- 1162 Larissa, an asteroid

== See also ==
- Philo of Larissa, a Greek philosopher
- Larisa (disambiguation)
