= George Sitts =

American serial killer (1913–1947)

- Detective Inspector Eugene Bernath (right) looks at the gun used by Sitts to murder Erik Johansson (December 13, 1945)
- Born: October 29, 1913; Le Roy, Minnesota, U.S.
- Died: April 8, 1947 (aged 33); South Dakota State Penitentiary, Sioux Falls, South Dakota, U.S.
- Status: Executed by electrocution
- Convictions: Iowa; Carrying a concealed weapon Receiving stolen property Minnesota; Second degree murder Burglary; South Dakota; First degree murder
- Penalty: Iowa; 90 days imprisonment Minnesota; Life imprisonment South Dakota; Death

Details
- Victims: 3
- Span of crimes: December 12, 1945 – January 24, 1946
- Country: United States
- States: Minnesota and South Dakota
- Date apprehended: February 5, 1946

George Sidney Sitts (October 29, 1913 – April 8, 1947) was an American serial killer executed by South Dakota for killing state Division of Criminal Investigation special agent Tom Matthews, who was attempting to arrest Sitts on a fugitive warrant from Minnesota. He was the only person to die in South Dakota's electric chair, and it would be over 60 years until the next time South Dakota would carry out an execution—Elijah Page via lethal injection on July 11, 2007.

== Early life ==
Sitts was born in Le Roy, Minnesota. He was regarded as a good student and was briefly an amateur boxer in Saint Paul, Minnesota. Sitts started committing crimes at 19, when he served 90 days in jail in Iowa for carrying a concealed weapon and receiving stolen property. Three years later, he was sentenced to 10 years in prison for burglary in Minnesota. He was paroled in 1941, but returned to prison in 1944 for violating his parole. After being released from prison in 1944, Sitts moved to Portland, Oregon to get a job. He was married at one point in his life, but said he and his wife later separated.

== Murders ==
Sitts, who escaped from prison while serving a life sentence for murder, also shot and killed Butte County Sheriff Dave Malcolm near Spearfish, on January 24, 1946. Sitts had pleaded guilty to second degree murder in Minnesota for the December 12, 1945, slaying of Erik Johansson, a liquor store clerk, during a botched robbery.

After spending three weeks sawing on the bars of his cell in the Minneapolis city jail, Sitts and three other men broke out the day before Sitts was scheduled to be transferred to a state prison.

After the slayings of Matthews and Malcolm, Sitts stole a car in Deadwood, kidnapped gas station attendant Leonard Ronnenberg, and forced him to Wyoming. He released Ronnenberg unharmed after reaching Wyoming, but was eventually captured on February 5, 1946, and returned to South Dakota. Sitts was tried first for the murder of Matthews and after his conviction and death sentence in March 1946, the state opted not to try him for Malcolm's murder.

South Dakota abolished the death penalty in 1915, but reinstated it in 1939, in the wake of public outrage over the brutal murder of a young teacher by two teenagers who kidnapped, shot, and beat her with a hammer. South Dakota introduced the electric chair as the manner of execution in 1939 and Sitts was the fourth man sentenced to die in the chair. However, the three previous sentences, that of Clifford Haas (also known as Clifford Hayes), Paul Sewell, and Jacob Heinzman, were all reduced to life in prison on appeal. Haas became one of the longest serving inmates in the state and died in prison in 1993.

Sitts's final words were a wry joke to the 41 official witnesses. "This is the first time authorities helped me escape prison," he said right before the four shocks surged through his body at 12:15 a.m.

Special Agent Matthews name is inscribed on Panel 34 of the National Law Enforcement Officers Memorial located on Judiciary Square, Washington, D.C. Sheriff Malcolm's name is inscribed on Panel 53.

== See also ==
- List of people executed in South Dakota (pre-1972)
- List of people executed in the United States in 1947
- List of serial killers in the United States

Executions carried out in South Dakota
Preceded by Joseph Rickman December 3, 1913	George Sitts; April 8, 1947	Succeeded by Elijah Page July 11, 2007
