= William Kunnecke =

German-born American murderer and suspected serial killer

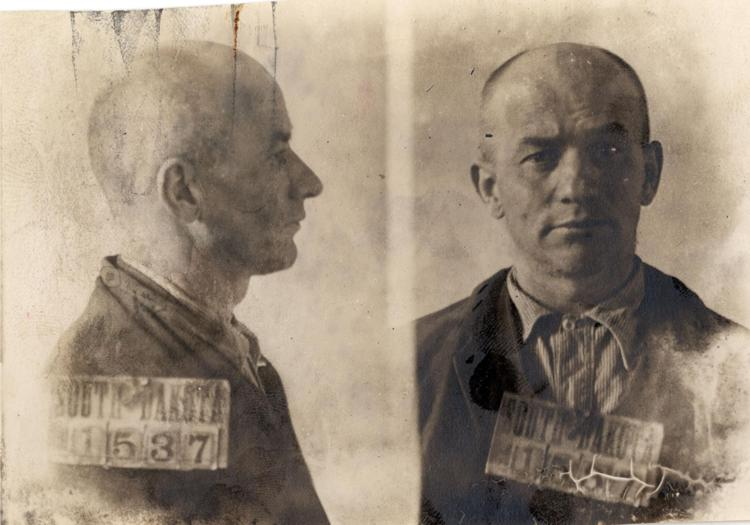
- Mugshot (1904)
- Born: 1850; Germany
- Disappeared: September 3, 1919
- Died: Unknown
- Other name: "The Human Monster"
- Conviction: Murder
- Penalty: Life imprisonment

Details
- Victims: 1–3
- Span of crimes: 1898–1903
- Country: United States
- States: Idaho, South Dakota
- Date apprehended: 1904
- Imprisoned at: South Dakota State Penitentiary, Sioux Falls, South Dakota

William Kunnecke (1850 – disappeared September 3, 1919), known as the Human Monster, was a German-American murderer and suspected serial killer, convicted of murdering farmhand Andrew Demler in South Dakota and suspected of two previous killings in Idaho. He was found guilty of Demler's murder and sentenced to life imprisonment at the South Dakota State Penitentiary, from where he escaped in 1919, never to be seen again.

== Move to America ==
William Kunnecke emigrated to the United States from Germany in 1884. He first settled in Mountain Home, Idaho, where he ran a shoe shop. He married Regina Kopp through a marriage bureau in 1896. He bought a herd of sheep, tending to them near Rocky Bar, while his wife worked at the farm. Eventually, the herd grew at a mysteriously rapid rate and the couple had to hire farmhands, several of whom later disappeared under suspicious circumstances.

== Murders ==
=== Koeninger ===
In 1895, Regina's nephew, known only by his surname Koeninger, arrived from Germany. William quickly employed him as a farmhand. Koeninger remained there for a year and a half, but then suddenly disappeared in the area of Trinity Mountain's lakes. Kunnecke then began searching for another herder in Rocky Bar, explaining that his previous one had returned to Germany. This claim was investigated by the German consulate in Portland, Oregon, which discovered that Koeninger's parents hadn't heard from him for a while. They also informed the consulate that Kunnecke had owed their son $800, for which he had given a note for the promised amount.

The German consulate demanded that he pay the required sum, but William claimed that he had already done so. In turn, he asked that arrangements be made for an indemnity bond, as a guarantee that his money can be refunded. Since a bond could not be taken out at the time, it was delivered at a later date to Mountain Home.

People were wondering about his reason to leave suddenly, and since the suspicion that Kunnecke had killed Koeninger was so strong, county commissioners offered a $1,000 reward for any information about his whereabouts. Kunnecke was last seen riding a saddle horse, claiming to be en route to Rocky Bar. It's believed that he instead went to Trinity Mountain, to get rid of any evidence there. A burned-down shack belonging to Kunnecke was later discovered in the mountains, and people suspected that Koeninger's body was discarded and subsequently burned to ashes in a deliberately-started fire, so nobody could find him.

=== Litzman ===
In the spring of 1900, the body of another sheep owner named Litzman was found on a trail between his farm and that of the Kunneckes. According to his surviving brother, Litzman was known to carry a lot of money on his person, as he had no faith in banks, but strangely, not a single dollar was found on his body. Kunnecke had already left town, ostensibly to skip a court-appointed $500 bail bond about violating a law about herding diseased sheep. His wife had remained in the town only so she could close up the business, withdraw $80 from the Rice & Co. Bank, which belonged to her nephew, and later join her husband. It later transpired that William had allegedly poisoned him, stolen the money and simply left the body lying on the trail.

=== Andrew Demler ===
After returning to Germany for a short time, Kunnecke returned to America, passing through Spearfish, South Dakota before settling on a farm in Cottonwood's creeks. Shortly after his arrival, Kunnecke ran into trouble with the law, having been accused, tried and convicted of stealing 300 sheep from James Cox, for which he had to pay $1,350 and spend a month in jail. In due time, he hired a young man named Charles Rohrbecker as a farmhand. Charles later disappeared, prompting his brother, William, who resided in Iowa, to come asking about him.

Kunnecke explained to the young William that his brother had quit, and that he didn't know what happened to him after that. William was offered a job at the ranch, where he met with Andrew Demler, who had already worked there for a few months, with Rohrbecker quickly learning that the fellow ranch hand never went anywhere without his trusty sheep-lined coat and dog. For a few weeks, everything was going fine. One day, however, Andrew vanished without a trace. When questioned, Kunnecke claimed that Demler had quit, and that he had sold all of his sheep to him.

Kunnecke then asked Rohrbecker to take over the job, to which he agreed. They then rode out to the sheep camp, where they found Demler's dog, sniffing at a pool of frozen blood to the side of a sled. Kunnecke tried to explain that he had killed a sick ewe and had discarded it there. This did not convince Rohrbecker, who opened the door to the little shack and found Demler's prized coat. The young William inquired about why it was there, receiving a threatening answer from his employer, who thought that he had asked "so many damn fool [sic] questions."

Panicked, Rohrbecker tried to quit right then and there, but was warned by Kunnecke that he'd have to stay at least until a new farm hand could be hired. Realizing that he had killed Demler and that the same fate probably awaited him as well, Rohrbecker reluctantly agreed to stay. Kunnecke then left, taking both horses with him, leaving the frightened William herding the sheep. While gathering the sheep, Rohrbecker spotted a washout that would lead him out of the sheep camp, waiting until nightfall before escaping.

He ran east towards Fort Pierre, so he could catch the nearest train back to Iowa. At some point during his night-long trot through the snow, he heard hoof beats on the trail behind him, and quickly hid in a ditch to avoid the rider. After the rider had gone away, he found his way to Fort Pierre, hopped on a train and once he arrived in Iowa, he wrote a letter to Sheriff Feeney about his suspicions toward Kunnecke.

== Capture ==
Initially skeptical of the claims, Feeney still decided to investigate the matter, as he knew of Kunnecke's previous criminal behavior, coupled with the fact that Demler hadn't been seen since February. He rode out to the farm and questioned the sheep herder, who claimed that Andrew had quit and gone off to New York through Pierre. Unconvinced by Kunnecke's story, Feeney visited him multiple times over the following three days, searching for any evidence of murder, only to come up empty-handed. Kunnecke did not realise who the man was at first, until a freight hauler asked him what the sheriff was doing at his farm. This statement frightened William, who immediately rushed out to the creek and dug out Demler's frozen body, intending to hide it in a secluded location and subsequently burn it.

Unbeknownst to him, however, Sheriff Feeney, along with a posse of six other men and two teenagers, had gone to his farm again in search of any clues. On the way to the farm, they noticed wagon tracks heading toward Plum Creek. The odd thing was that there were three tracks, while there should've been two, with one of them leading off toward a nearby creek bottom. Feeney and one of men, Henry Schacht, followed the tracks, and soon discovered a small clump of hair and freshly dug dirt. They searched for a body, but again, nothing turned up. Despite this, Feeney was certain somebody had been buried here, and the posse then went towards the wagon tracks.

Only three miles later, they ran into none other than William Kunnecke himself. Feeney confronted him about working so early, with Kunnecke claiming he'd been after firewood. The now-fed up Feeney asked him to get off the wagon so it could be searched, to which Kunnecke agreed. He was found to be in possession of only a broken pocketknife and an axe. Feeney and Schacht got Kunnecke on a horse, and then rode out with him to Hayes, while the others continued searching for a body.

Not long after, the posse found two body pieces belonging to Demler, 50 feet off the trail near Plum Creek. His frozen body had been hacked to pieces, but that was not the cause of death: it was apparent that Andrew had been shot in the head with a pistol, before being shot again in the mouth and head with a shotgun, leaving powder burns on the clothing. In the meantime, Kunnecke had already spoken to a lawyer of the Horner and Stewart law firm. Feeney then marched him off to the Hughes County jail.

== Imprisonment and escape ==
William Kunnecke spent almost a year in prison awaiting trial, as his lawyers had secured him a January term, following an unsuccessful bid for a change of venue, citing local prejudice against their client. During this time, he tried to escape on three separate occasions, and on one of them, he was found with a saw made from an old caseknife, a stove poker, a large bottle and a stick. After being punished for this, he proceeded to go on a six-day long hunger strike, tried to kill himself by eating a bar of soap, and finally, another suicide attempt by starting a fight with two other prisoners, during which he was beaten up before the jailer could interfere. In the meantime, there was a report of a human skeleton found at Kunnecke's old farm, which later turned out to be animal bones.

Eventually, William Kunnecke confessed to Demler's murder, although he claimed it was in self-defense. He was sentenced to life imprisonment, and sent off to the South Dakota State Penitentiary. On September 3, 1919, while watering the prison lawn, he managed to slip through the gate unnoticed, when it was opened so some work teams could go through. His absence was quickly noticed by Warden Redfield, who pursued Kunnecke with an automobile, but by then, the convict had already put some distance between himself and the authorities.

Detective agencies through the entire USA were notified about him, but although he spoke with a distinct German accent, he travelled only at night, successfully evading police. One report claimed that a man matching Kunnecke's description was seen at El Paso, Texas, before making his way over the border into Mexico, but this has not been conclusively proven, and his ultimate fate remains unknown.

== See also ==
- List of fugitives from justice who disappeared
- List of serial killers in the United States
