= Murder of Chester Poage =

American murder victim (1980–2000)

Chester Poage
- Born: Chester Allan Poage; July 4, 1980; Norton County, Kansas, U.S.
- Died: March 13, 2000 (aged 19); Spearfish, South Dakota, U.S.
- Cause of death: Blunt force trauma and stab wounds

Chester Allan Poage (July 4, 1980 – March 13, 2000) was an American man who was kidnapped, tortured, and murdered by three men in Spearfish, South Dakota, on March 13, 2000. Elijah Page, Briley Piper, and Darrell Hoadley were convicted of the torture and murder of Poage. Page and Piper were sentenced to death, while Hoadley was sentenced to life in prison. Page was executed by lethal injection on July 11, 2007, becoming the first person to be executed in South Dakota since 1947. Piper remains on death row and is the only person left on death row in South Dakota.

== Background ==
Chester Allan Poage was born on July 4, 1980, in Norton County, Kansas. He grew up on a farm just outside Norton, but moved with his family to Rapid City, South Dakota in 1994. In 1996, his father died by suicide, just days after his parents had filed for divorce. The family moved back to Norton but later moved to Spearfish, South Dakota while Poage was at college. Prior to his death, Poage was attending Northwest Kansas Technical School and was a half-year from graduating in communications technology.

== Murder ==
On the evening of March 12, 2000, Page, Piper, and Hoadley met with Poage at his family home in Spearfish. The four of them were acquainted and met to play video games together. Poage's mother and sister were in Florida on vacation at the time, meaning that the house was empty. Later on, the four of them left the house and drove in Poage's Chevrolet Blazer to the house where Page, Piper, and Hoadley were staying.

Once inside, Page produced a .22 caliber pistol, which he had stolen from Poage's home, and ordered Poage to get on the floor. The three men planned to rob Poage's family home and did not want a witness to the crime. As Poage lay on the floor, he was kicked repeatedly by Piper until he was unconscious. He was then tied up with a cord and placed in a chair. Piper put a tire iron across Poage's feet to prevent him from moving.

When Poage regained consciousness, he pleaded with his attackers to let him go, but they refused. Instead, he was forced to drink beer containing crushed pills and hydrochloric acid. His ATM card was then taken from him by Page. The perpetrators then discussed their plan to murder Poage while they stood in front of him.

Poage was forced into his own vehicle and was driven approximately seven miles to Higgins Gulch, a remote wooded area in the Black Hills. He was ordered out of the vehicle and pushed into thick snow. He was stripped naked, apart from his undershirt, shoes, and socks. Poage was then escorted downhill toward a small icy creek. During the walk, he was beaten repeatedly until he was forced to lie down in the creek, where he was attacked again.

As Poage lay in the creek, he was stabbed in the neck by Page with a knife. The three men then decided it was time to kill him. Poage requested to be let into his vehicle so he could warm himself up. He said he preferred to bleed to death in the warmth, rather than freezing to death in the cold. Piper agreed to the request if he washed blood off his body first. As Poage washed himself, Piper changed his mind, and Poage was violently dragged back into the creek by the three men as they attempted to drown him. Poage was then finally killed by having rocks thrown at his head.

Page later stated that he and Hoadley ended Poage's life by dropping several large rocks on his head. Piper's brief contends that he did not take part in the drowning attempt or stabbings. Piper argues that he had returned to Poage's vehicle as he was being killed. According to Piper, Hoadley was the one who threw the final rock that killed Poage, but at that point in time, Piper was not there to personally witness the murder. However, Piper allegedly admitted standing on Poage's neck to assist Hoadley in drowning him and then reportedly stabbed Poage twice.

Both Page and Hoadley admitted that they both dropped heavy rocks on Poage's head, actions which they believe are what finally killed him. Hours after the beatings first began, Poage was left for dead in the creek in the early hours of March 13.

== Aftermath ==
Page, Piper, and Hoadley drove away from the scene in Poage's vehicle. They returned to his house and stole several items from the family home, including a stereo system and some clothes. The men then drove to visit Piper's sister in Hannibal, Missouri, hoping they could stay with her for a while. She refused to let them stay with her so they returned to South Dakota. They traveled to Rapid City, where they used Poage's ATM card to withdraw cash and sold some of his property. The three men then split up and went their separate ways, with Piper deciding to return to his home state of Alaska.

On April 22, 2000, a woman came across the remains of Poage in Higgins Gulch. A forensic pathologist identified the remains and later confirmed the deceased man was Poage. It was determined that stab wounds and blunt force injury to the head were his cause of death. On April 25, police interviewed Hoadley and he gave a statement detailing his involvement in the murder. He confessed to the crime and gave police the names of his accomplices. Warrants were then issued for both Page and Piper, who had fled the state. Three days later, law enforcement located and arrested Page in Texas. Piper was tracked down in Alaska and was arrested for first degree murder.

Page voluntarily described to authorities the details surrounding Poage's murder. Piper also gave a statement and described Poage's torture and murder, as well as his participation in the crime. Both men were then subsequently extradited to South Dakota and jailed in Lawrence County. In a bid for leniency, Page and Piper both pleaded guilty to first degree murder. They were both sentenced to death. Hoadley received a life sentence after being convicted at trial. Page was executed by lethal injection on July 11, 2007, while Piper remains on death row. Following the execution of Charles Rhines in 2019, Piper is the only person on death row in South Dakota. Poage is buried at Norton Cemetery in his hometown of Norton, Kansas.

== Perpetrators ==
=== Elijah Page ===
Page in June 2006

Elijah Page (December 1, 1981 – July 11, 2007) was born in Titusville, Florida. While he was still young, he moved with his family to Kansas City, Missouri. Page had a very abusive childhood. He lived with his family in abandoned buildings without heat or utilities. At age two, his mother, Michelle Page, allowed drug dealers to molest him in exchange for drugs. His stepfather, Wes Cline, beat and molested him and once even used him as a human shield in a drug-related shootout. When people learned about the state of the family, they provided them with a kerosene heater, food and clothes. In the early 1990s, Page and his two sisters were finally removed from the home after the parents of Alice Person, a friend of Elijah's sister, Desiree Page, learned about the abuse and reported it. According to Alice's mother, Tamie Person, Elijah had it worse than his sisters, who were treated better since Desiree resembled their mother while the other, Casia Page, resembled their stepfather.

Person and several other neighbors went through Department of Social Service training specifically to help Page and his siblings. Page stayed with the Person family from the spring of 1993 to the end of 1994. Alice Person described him as a good child, but said that after a year had passed, Page started exhibiting antisocial behavior, making Person's children nervous. At one point, Elijah shoved Alison down during an argument, which led to an angry argument between her mother and Page, albeit she later said that she had unintentionally provoked him by lightly pushing him first. Two hours later, Page left for another foster home, after which he started moving from one to another. On a number of occasions, he was sent to juvenile detention.

For a time, Page went to Athens, Texas, where his biological father, Kenneth Chapman, lived. However, he stayed in foster homes since Chapman could not take care of him. In Texas, Allison Person said Page started getting into trouble for crimes such as car theft and burglary, albeit not for anything violent. At some point, Page got a job in Kansas City, before moving to South Dakota in December of 1999 with people he knew from church. In South Dakota, he began dating a woman named Misty Guettler. Misty's mother, Pamela, later said that Page had forced her daughter, who had gotten into trouble with drugs and was under state supervision, to stay clean and out of trouble. In early March 2000, Misty was ordered to report to a correctional boot camp. Page was fired from his job at a McDonald's after he missed work to go with the Guettlers to send Misty to boot camp in Rapid City. Less than two weeks later, he participated in Poage's kidnapping, torture, and murder.

Page pleaded guilty and waived his right to have a jury determine his sentence. A sentencing hearing was held in front of Judge Warren Johnson. At the hearing, 19 witnesses testified on his behalf. Asked if he had anything to say, Page apologized to Poage's family.

"I know I'm the last—I'm one of the last people you would want to hear from, but please let me say this to you. It may not mean anything to you, but I feel I owe at least this one thing. This is very hard for me, but I will do the best I can. Here it goes: I am sorry for what I did. I wish I could explain how sorry I am. I know that doesn't make up for what I did. I also know that nothing I do will make up for what I did. I don't expect you to forgive me; God knows I wouldn't forgive me. I'm sure you would like an explanation of why I did what I did. I can't speak for the other two, but for myself, personally, I cannot give you an answer to that question because I honestly don't know why I did it. I know that I did was wrong. I feel like the biggest piece of shit for it, and I hope I get what I deserve. I don't know what else to say. I don't expect you ever to forgive me, but I just want you to know that my apology is here. And please don't hate my family and friends for what I did. If you hate anybody, hate me."

On February 16, 2001, Johnson sentenced Page to death. Addressing him directly, Johnson said the decision had been extremely difficult, given his age and especially his upbringing.

"I've considered the evidence in mitigation. I've considered your young age and your background. Your early years must have been a living hell. Most people treat their pets better than your parents treated their kids. It's also apparent from your background that there was a point in time when people and professional people offered help in the form of foster care, group care, psychological treatment, psychiatric counseling. Some of these people have testified on your behalf."

However, Johnson decided that the horrific nature of Poage's death, combined with Page's active role in it, were too extreme to warrant mercy. The South Dakota Supreme Court later summarized Page's active role in the crime.

Page began the ordeal by pointing a pistol at Poage, a pistol he had previously stolen from the victim's house. Page and Piper rendered the victim helpless by tying him up with a cord--an idea first expressed by Page. Page engaged in a discussion concerning how the group would murder Poage. Both at the house and at the gulch, Page prevented Poage's escape or opportunity to escape. By his own admission, Page was the first to stab the victim. In fact, when the other two assailants first expressed reluctance about stabbing Poage, Page apparently had little qualms, saying "Fuck it, I'll do it." Page also admitted to a psychologist, Dr. Mark Perrenoud, that [he] did the most physical damage to Poage of any of the three defendants. After finally murdering Poage, it was Page who received the victim’s vehicle, the most valuable of the property stolen by the group.

Likewise, Johnson told Page, "There might have been a follower out there that day, but it wasn't you. You and Piper were two of a kind," and that he was a "major participant from the beginning to the end," having been the first aggressor, been the first to stab Poage, and having chasing after him when he tried to run away. In addition, Johnson pointed out that not only did Page have many opportunities to end his involvement, he could've easily saved Poage's life, since he was the only one with a gun.

"By your own admission, the kidnapping and killing of Allan took maybe two hours or more. You had lots of chances to change your mind and back out. Had you dropped the gun on the floor and headed out the door and ran down the street, I doubt if Piper would have chased you down. I doubt if he would have gone through with the plan, knowing that a key witness was now on the loose. You had chances to spare Allan's life."

Furthermore, a psychiatrist had testified that Page was sane and of fairly average intelligence. Asked by an investigator what Poage could've done to deserve what happened to him, Page replied, "He never done any wrong to us. I mean he was always nice. He just tried to be our friend and stuff." While Page did show some signs of remorse, prosecutors questioned his sincerity. In jail, Page had talked about the murder with numerous fellow inmates.

His cellmate, Eric Ollila, testified that during his seven days with page, Page had talked about the crime daily, both to him and twelve others in his cellblock about the crime. As he spoke of the crime, he talked about it without any show of emotion. His only concern was that he hoped he would not be sentenced to death. Page suspected that Ollila had been interviewed about these conversations. He also wrote a letter in which he threatened to rape a female guard who'd upset him.

Regarding Page's background, Johnson noted that while Page did not appear to be totally incorrigible, he had rejected help for most of his life. Rather than seeking help for his psychological issues, "you turned to the company of Briley Piper," he'd told Page. Page had repeatedly been sent to juvenile detention centers for burglaries, car thefts, and antisocial behavior. He consistently ran away and rejected programs intended to help him. As early as March 1997, psychologists and psychiatrists noted Page was exhibiting sociopathic traits, such as uncontrollable anger, a lack of remorse, and an absence of a conscience. Page's recorded lack of a desire to change was noted by Johnson.

The Ozanam Boys Home in the State of Missouri found Defendant Page had made absolutely no progress while in their treatment facility, and that he exhibited no commitment whatsoever in any type of change in his antisocial behaviors. He repeatedly ran away from their facility, he was defiant, and was alienated to all forms of discipline. He showed no ability to take responsibility for his behavior and blamed other people for his situation.

On January 4, 2006, the South Dakota Supreme Court upheld the sentences of Page and Piper in a 3-2 decision. Later that month, he wrote a letter to Governor Mike Rounds and officials, saying he wanted to end his appeals and proceed with his death sentence. On February 17, 2006, Johnson set an execution date for Page for the week of August 28, 2006. On May 19, 2006, Johnson ruled that Page would have a psychiatric evaluation to determine whether he was mentally competent to fire his attorneys, end his appeals, and expedite his own execution.

A hearing was held on August 14, 2006, after which Johnson found Page to be mentally competent. On the evening of August 27, 2006, prison warden Doug Weber announced that Page's sentence would be carried out on the night of August 29. Just hours before Page was to be put to death, however, he was granted a reprieve by Governor Mike Rounds until at least July 1, 2007, over a technicality involving the execution drugs. On December 15, Johnson ordered that Page be executed on the week of July 9.

Page's mother would admit to neglecting her son, but denied ever abusing him. Those who knew the family disputed this. To the day of his execution, which he denied her permission to attend, Page refused to have anything to do with his mother. He rejected her offers to speak to her, let alone visit him in prison. In contrast, Page reconnected with his biological father, Kenneth Chapman, who was absent from his life until he was 13.

In the final week before Page's execution, Chapman visited him on a daily basis. Both he and Desiree said that while his actions were horrific, he was not as heartless as many had made him out to be. Chapman said Page's upbringing had shaped him into a murderer. He did not ask for people to feel sorry for him, but said few people would've been willing to accept their punishment in the way he did.

Desiree said her brother had told her that he was haunted by what he'd done and thought about the crime on a nightly basis. She conceded that a major factor in her turning out differently is that she had been able to talk about her trauma, whereas her brother buried his feelings. Desiree admitted to having been a drug addict in the past, but said she'd eventually stopped. She also said that Page having not slept in four days and being high on meth and LSD at the time of the murder had most likely contributed to his actions that night.

On the afternoon of July 9, 2007, Doug Weber announced that Page's sentence would be carried out on the night of July 11. Page was executed by lethal injection at South Dakota State Penitentiary in Sioux Falls on July 11, 2007. He was the first person executed in South Dakota since 1947 and the first person executed in South Dakota since the state reinstated capital punishment in 1979. At the age of 25, Page is also the youngest person executed in South Dakota in the modern era. No one younger than him has been executed in the United States since his execution. Page's last meal was steak, jalapeño peppers, onion rings, a salad, and ice cream. Asked if he had any last words, Page said he did not.

In 2011, Poage's mother, Dottie Poage, said she respected Page's decision to stop fighting his sentence, after learning about the extent of his remorse. Page believed that he deserved to die for what he'd done. Shortly before Page's execution, Dottie admitted that she did have some pity for Page after learning about his upbringing and felt that he wasn't entirely to blame for the way he turned out. She said the system hadn't been adequate enough to help him, even though this did not excuse his actions.

=== Briley Piper ===
Briley Wayne Piper (born March 20, 1980) grew up in Anchorage, Alaska. When he was 13, he was arrested for allegedly grabbing a woman and was also arrested for assault after robbing a classmate at knifepoint. Prosecutors have argued that Piper was the ringleader of the group and was good at manipulating people.

Piper pleaded guilty to Poage's death in January 2001, waiving his right to have a jury determine his sentence. Judge Warren Johnson sentenced him to death on January 19, 2001. At his sentencing hearing, it was revealed that Piper had made plans to escape from jail and tried to enlist other inmates. The plan called for an escape in which two female guards would be taken hostage and later killed. Piper also indicated that he wanted to kill Elijah Page, whom he suspected of cooperating with the police.

Prior to sentencing, a tearful Piper had given a statement of remorse. However, the prosecution argued that this was a facade. Darrell Hoadley's girlfriend testified that Piper had laughed about the murder afterwards. Two inmates testified that Piper had told them that he wanted to know what it felt like to kill someone and had found the experience exciting.

In the letter requesting the end of his appeals, Elijah Page had claimed that it was solely the idea of him and Hoadley to kill Poage and that Piper had wanted nothing to do with the crime. He said he'd manipulated and threatened Piper into participating, claiming that he'd threatened to shoot his sister. However, Page's sister said these claims were false and had stemmed from her brother's upbringing. Since Page's mother and stepfather would routinely blame him whenever something bad happened, he had continued to do so as an adult. The courts and prosecutors have backed this view. Prison officials described Piper as the ringleader and Page and Hoadley as followers.

Johnson also noted that, unlike his two accomplices, Piper had had a good upbringing:

"I felt sorry, terribly sorry, for your mom and dad. There's no doubt that at one time you were a good kid and a good scout. Somehow, within a few short years, you went from being a good son to a thief, a thug, and eventually a killer."

Piper appealed his conviction, and in 2009, the State Supreme Court overturned the death sentence, arguing that a jury should decide his fate. The jury sentenced him to death in August 2011, with the sentence being upheld in 2019. With the execution of Charles Russell Rhines on November 4, 2019, Piper is now the only person left on death row in South Dakota. As of March 2025, Piper's latest appeal to overturn his conviction was denied by the South Dakota District judge.

Piper filed a federal habeas corpus action in the U.S. District Court for South Dakota. The case was assigned to the Honorable Roberto A. Lange. On May 4, 2026, the 8th Circuit Court of Appeals has affirmed Judge Lange’s decision. He remains incarcerated at South Dakota State Penitentiary awaiting execution.

=== Darrell Hoadley ===
Darrell R. Hoadley (born November 5, 1979) was born in Laramie, Wyoming. He had a difficult childhood and was abused by his mother and her male friends. By the time of the murder he was living in Lead, South Dakota and had a daughter. Unlike Page and Piper, Hoadley did not waive his right to have a jury determine his sentence. He pleaded not guilty at his trial. After the jury deadlocked 8–4 in favor of life in prison, he was spared execution. Hoadley was sentenced to life in prison in 2001. He remains incarcerated at South Dakota State Penitentiary.

== See also ==
- Capital punishment in South Dakota
- Capital punishment in the United States
- List of death row inmates in the United States
- List of people executed in South Dakota
- List of people executed in the United States in 2007
- List of solved missing person cases (post-2000)
- Volunteer (capital punishment)

Executions carried out in South Dakota
Preceded by George Sitts April 8, 1947	Elijah Page; July 11, 2007	Succeeded by Eric Robert October 15, 2012
Executions carried out in the United States
Preceded by John Hightower – Georgia June 26, 2007	Elijah Page – South Dakota; July 11, 2007	Succeeded by Lonnie Johnson – Texas July 24, 2007
