= List of people executed in South Dakota =

The following is a list of people executed by the U.S. state of South Dakota since 1976. Capital punishment was reinstated in South Dakota in 1979 following the U.S. Supreme Court decision of Gregg v. Georgia. The method of execution was changed from electrocution to lethal injection in 1984. Since 1979, a total of 5 people have been executed, all by lethal injection. With the exception of Charles Rhines, all of them had waived their appeals.

== List of people executed in South Dakota since 1976 ==
| No. | Name | Race | Age | Sex | Date of execution | County | Method | Victim(s) | Governor |
|---|---|---|---|---|---|---|---|---|---|
| 1 | Elijah Page | White | 25 | M | July 11, 2007 | Lawrence | Lethal injection | Chester Allan Poage | Mike Rounds |
| 2 | Eric Donald Robert | White | 50 | M | October 15, 2012 | Minnehaha | Lethal injection | Correctional Officer Ronald Johnson | Dennis Daugaard |
| 3 | Donald Eugene Moeller | White | 60 | M | October 30, 2012 | Lincoln | Lethal injection | Becky O'Connell | Dennis Daugaard |
| 4 | Rodney Scott Berget | White | 56 | M | October 29, 2018 | Minnehaha | Lethal injection | Correctional Officer Ronald Johnson | Dennis Daugaard |
| 5 | Charles Russell Rhines | White | 63 | M | November 4, 2019 | Pennington | Lethal injection | Donnivan Schaeffer | Kristi Noem |

=== Demographics ===
Race
| White | 5 | 100% |
Age
| 20–29 | 1 | 20% |
| 30–39 | 0 | 0% |
| 40–49 | 0 | 0% |
| 50–59 | 2 | 40% |
| 60–69 | 2 | 40% |
Sex
| Male | 5 | 100% |
Date of execution
| 1976–1979 | 0 | 0% |
| 1980–1989 | 0 | 0% |
| 1990–1999 | 0 | 0% |
| 2000–2009 | 1 | 20% |
| 2010–2019 | 4 | 80% |
| 2020–2029 | 0 | 0% |
Method
| Lethal injection | 5 | 100% |
Governor (Party)
| Richard F. Kneip (D) | 0 | 0% |
| Harvey Wollman (D) | 0 | 0% |
| Bill Janklow (R) | 0 | 0% |
| George S. Mickelson (R) | 0 | 0% |
| Walter Dale Miller (R) | 0 | 0% |
| Mike Rounds (R) | 1 | 20% |
| Dennis Daugaard (R) | 3 | 60% |
| Kristi Noem (R) | 1 | 20% |
| Larry Rhoden (R) | 0 | 0% |
| Total | 5 | 100% |

== See also ==
- Capital punishment in South Dakota
- Capital punishment in the United States
- List of people executed in South Dakota (pre-1972)
