= Larisa (Caria) =

Ancient city in Caria

Coordinates: 37°54′20″N 27°51′13″E

Larisa (Ancient Greek: Λαρίσα) was a town of ancient Caria, inhabited during Roman times.

Its site is located north of Tralles, Asiatic Turkey.
