= Larissa Burak =

Australian musician

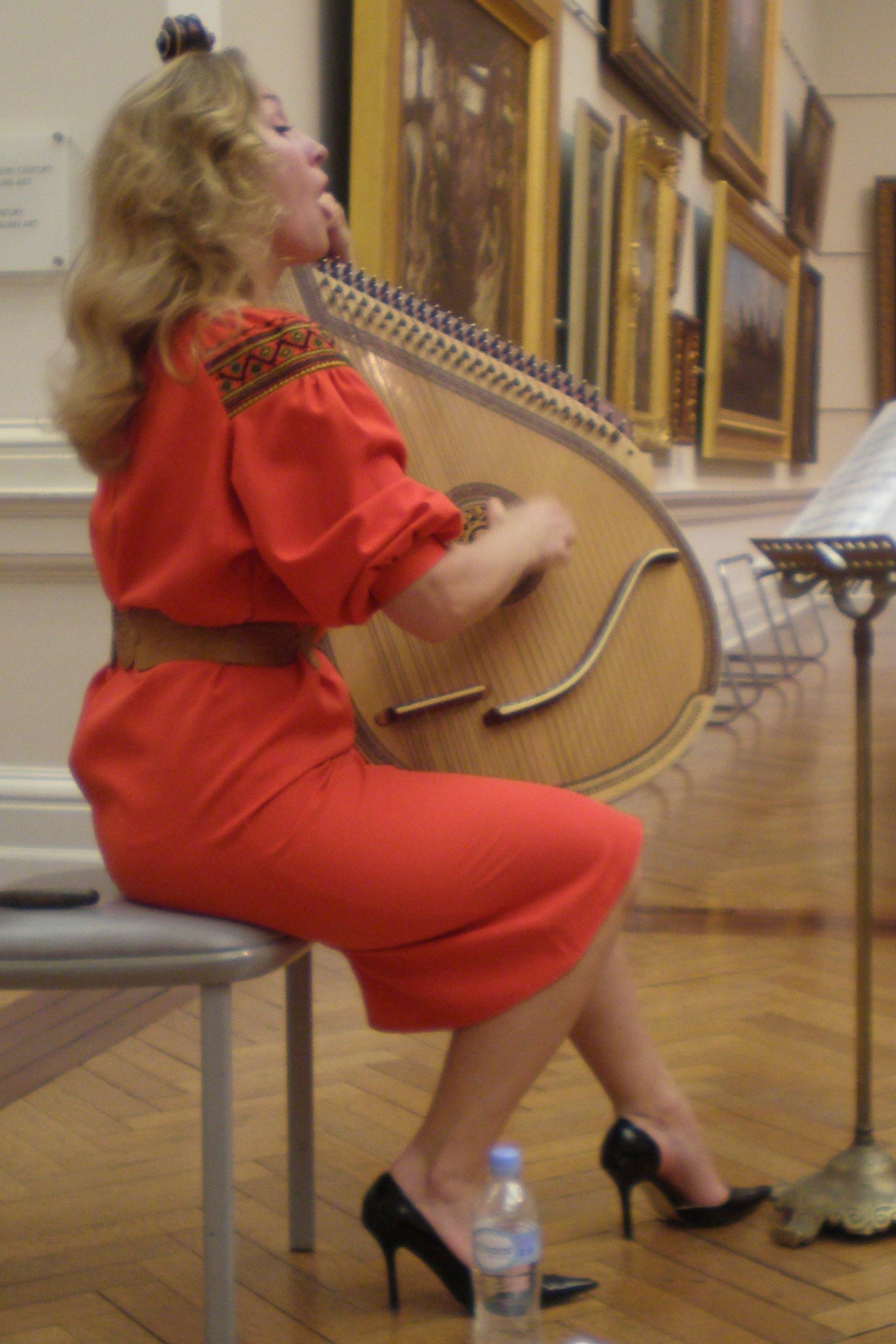
Larissa playing at the Art Gallery of New South Wales in October 2010

Larissa Burak (Ukrainian: Лариса Буряк; born 1968 Khorostkiv, Ternopil Oblast, Ukraine) is a Ukrainian-Australian bandurist and mezzo-soprano singer, concert musician, soloist, and choir conductor who lives in Sydney, Australia. Since completing her Master of Education at the University of Sydney, Larissa now is the leading vocal teacher at the Riverina Conservatorium of Music.

== Studies and career ==
Larissa completed her master's degree in Music at the Kyiv Conservatory in Ukraine in 1992. She has performed in numerous festivals in Ukraine and Western Europe, including Latvia, Estonia, Germany and France. She has recorded with the SBS Radio and Television in Australia, to which she relocated, and has appeared in numerous venues there. Musica Viva Australia, Cafe Carnivale. Among her more notable performances, in 1993 she was a laureate of the all-Ukrainian Bandura Festival and in 1994 played the bandura in Brussels with Roman Hrynkiv at the "All the World's Violins" Festival. She has led workshops in singing and music at the Sydney Children's choir.
