= Larisa (Ionia) =

Town of ancient Ionia

Larisa (Ancient Greek: Λάρισα) was a town of ancient Ionia. Strabo distinguishes it from other homonymous cities of Asia Minor, mentioning that the Larisa of Ionia was in the Cayster River plain, 180 stadia from Ephesus, where there was a sanctuary of Apollo Larisaeus.

Its site is unlocated.
