= Larissa Kojoue =

Cameroonian academic and activist

Larissa Kojoué
- Born: Cameroon
- Education: Sciences Po Bordeaux (PhD)
- Occupation: Researcher on political science
- Website: ubonline.academia.edu/LarissaKOJOUE

Larissa Kojoué is a Cameroonian political scientist and feminist activist committed to social justice.

== Education ==
She holds a doctorate in Political Science from the Institutes of Political Studies of Bordeaux, France, obtained in 2013. She also graduated from the University of Yaoundé II-SOA in Cameroon in 2006. Her academic background laid a foundation for her interests in political sociology, state-society relations, and social justice activism focused on gender and sexual minorities in Africa.

== Career ==
Beyond academic studies, she works on movement building, leadership training, advocacy, resource mobilization, and coordination of community projects aimed at women's rights and sexual minorities in West and Central Africa.

She has a Pan-African feminist perspective and participates in campaigns for the decriminalization of same-sex conduct and broader human rights issues related to gender and sexuality. She is also an associate researcher at "Fondation Paul Ango Ela de géopolitique en Afrique Centrale" (FPAE) and at Research Institute for Development (IRD - France).

Larissa Kojoue has conducted research on global health policies, particularly HIV/AIDS, citizenship, queer mobilizations, LGBTQ rights and digital practices related to sexuality in Africa. She has taught political sociology at the University of Lyon Lumiere in France and the University of Buea in Cameroon. Her scholarly work involves critical analysis of how HIV/AIDS policies intersect with citizenship rights and identity politics in African contexts. Additionally she has contributed to scholarly discourse, evidenced by the publication of a dozen articles focusing on global health, citizenship, and the complexities of state-society relationships.

== Publications ==
- Kojoué, L., Le Naëlou, A., & Hoffman, E. "Distorsions et dilemmes du système performatif de l’aide internationale au développement," Revue internationale des études du développement, 2020
- Kojoué, L. "La continuité autoritariste. Saisir les (non)transformations de l’État à partir des politiques de lutte contre le VIH/sida au Cameroun," International Development Policy, 2020.
- Kojoué, L. "Un exclu peut-il être citoyen? Mobilisations homosexuelles autour du VIH/sida et bio citoyenneté au Cameroun," Politique Africaine, 2019
- Kojoué, L. (ed.) Tu seras docteur mon enfant. Expériences et postures de recherche des thésards africains, L’Harmattan, 2017
- Kojoué, L. "LGBT Rights in a Republic of Therapy. HIV/AIDS policies and the redefinition of citizenship in Cameroon," Critical African Studies, 2017
