= Larisa (Lydia) =

Town in ancient Lydia

Coordinates: 38°09′11″N 27°44′29″E

Larisa (Ancient Greek: Λαρίσα) or Larissa (Λάρισσα) was a town of ancient Lydia. It was in the territory of Ephesus, on the north bank of the Caystrus, which there flowed through a most fertile district, producing an excellent kind of wine. It was situated at a distance of 180 stadia from Ephesus, and 30 from Tralles. In Strabo's time it had sunk to the rank of a village, but it was said once to have been a polis (Πόλις), with a temple of Apollo.

Its site is located near Çatal, Asiatic Turkey.
