= Larisa (given name) =

Larisa is a feminine given name. Notable people with the name include:

- Larisa Bergen (1949–2023), Soviet Olympic volleyball player
- Larisa Blazic (born 1970), British video installation artist and academic
- Larisa Dolina (born 1955), Russian singer and actress
- Larisa Dumansky, Ukrainian woman who has been missing since 1994
- Larisa Gribaleva (born 1973), Belarusian singer, TV presenter and actress
- Larisa Guzeyeva (born 1959), Soviet and Russian actress and television host
- Larisa Iordache (born 1996), Romanian artist gymnast
- Larisa Latynina (born 1934), Russian-Ukrainian former Soviet gymnast
- Larisa Maksimova (1943–2025), Russian mathematical logician
- Larisa Neiland (born 1966), Latvian tennis player
- Larisa Oleynik (born 1981), American actress
- Larisa Petrik (born 1949), Soviet gymnast
- Larisa Ratushnaya (1921–1944), hero of the Soviet Union
- Larisa Shepitko (1938–1979), Soviet film director
- Larisa Shoigu (1953–2021), Russian politician
