= Execution of Charles Rhines =

2019 execution in South Dakota

Charles Rhines
- Charles Rhines prior to his execution
- Born: Charles Russell Rhines; July 11, 1956; McLaughlin, South Dakota, U.S.
- Died: November 4, 2019 (aged 63); South Dakota State Penitentiary, Sioux Falls, South Dakota, U.S.
- Cause of death: Execution by lethal injection
- Convictions: First degree murder Third degree burglary (2 counts)
- Penalty: Death (January 26, 1993)

Details
- Victims: Donnivan Schaeffer, 22
- Date: March 8, 1992
- Weapon: Knife

The execution of Charles Rhines took place on November 4, 2019, at the South Dakota State Penitentiary in Sioux Falls. Rhines was executed for the 1992 murder of Donnivan Schaeffer, whom he killed during a burglary at a doughnut shop in Rapid City. His execution drew attention due to claims that the jury sentenced him to death because he was gay and that anti-gay bias had tainted his sentence. Rhines remains the most recent person executed in South Dakota.

== Background ==
=== Early life ===
Charles Russell Rhines was born on July 11, 1956, in McLaughlin, South Dakota, the last of four children born to Richard and Ruth Rhines. Rhines attended McLaughlin Public School but dropped out in his sophomore year. He enlisted in the U.S. Army and served three years as an infantryman, earning his high school General Equivalency Degree. He went on to study at the University of South Dakota in Springfield for vocational training. However, he never completed the course as he was caught stealing from another student's room. He was convicted of third-degree burglary and sentenced to three years in prison. After being paroled, he robbed a liquor store with a shotgun and was sentenced to ten years in prison for armed robbery. He was released in 1987.

=== Murder ===
In June 1991, Rhines was hired by Dennis Digges to work as a night baker at Dig 'Em Donuts shop in Rapid City. According to the co-owner of the business, they did not know about Rhines's criminal record. Rhines was not liked while working at the shop and was eventually fired in February 1992 for failing to follow orders. After running out of money, Rhines decided to burglarize the shop a few weeks after his dismissal.

On March 8, 1992, Rhines entered the shop using a copy of the back door key and began burglarizing the vacant premises. While Rhines was robbing the shop, he was suddenly interrupted by 22-year-old Donnivan Schaeffer, an employee who worked there. Schaeffer, a courier, had come to the shop to pick up supplies. Rhines ambushed Schaeffer and stabbed him in the stomach. Schaeffer begged to be taken to the hospital and promised to remain silent. However, Rhines instead forced him into a storeroom, where he tied him up and stabbed him to death. Rhines then stole over $3,000 from the shop and fled the area.

Schaeffer's body was found and a funeral was held. Rhines attended the funeral with his roommate. He left South Dakota a few days later and headed to Washington. On June 19, he was arrested in Seattle but was not returned to South Dakota until August 13. Rhines revealed the details of the murder to his roommate's girlfriend, 16-year-old Heather Shepard, then threatened to kill her if she said anything.

== Trial ==
Rhines confessed to the crime. Despite this, the state took the case to trial when they refused to drop the death penalty in exchange for a guilty plea to murder. In South Dakota, the death penalty can only be imposed by a jury, and it must be unanimous.

On January 26, 1993, Rhines was sentenced to death. All twelve members of the jury found Rhines should be sentenced to death by lethal injection. They found three aggravating circumstances surrounding the murder: Rhines had killed a witness to a crime, killed for money, and the murder was torturous or showed depravity of mind. Following the verdict, Rhines leaned forward and dropped his head into his hands.

=== Accusations of anti-gay bias ===
Rhines did not deny killing Schaeffer. He argued that his death sentence was inappropriate because his crime was no worse than "dozens of other killers" in the state. In 2014, Rhines wrote a letter listing seventeen other convicted murderers in South Dakota who did not receive the death penalty. He also pointed out other murders that had occurred between 1991 and 1992 in South Dakota, of which none of the perpetrators had received the death penalty.

Rhines's lawyers argued that Rhines was discriminated against and received a death sentence because he was gay. Rhines's sexuality was discussed frequently during his trial. During deliberations, a note was sent to the judge asking what life in prison would mean for Rhines. Other questions asked included: "Would Rhines have a cellmate? Would he be allowed to create a group of followers or admirers? Would he be allowed to have conjugal visits?" The judge refused to answer any of the questions.

Some of the jurors thought that a life sentence served in a men's prison is something Rhines, a gay man, would enjoy. One juror recalled in an interview that there was "a lot of disgust" about Rhines's sexual orientation during deliberation. Another juror recalled that they knew he was gay and "thought that he shouldn't be able to spend his life with men in prison." A third juror recounted that another juror had said, "If he’s gay, we'd be sending him where he wants to go."

Rhines's lawyers contended his death sentence should be overturned based on anti-gay bias from jurors. They argued this violated his right to an impartial jury and due process. Ultimately, these arguments were rejected.

== Execution ==
On November 4, 2019, Rhines was executed via lethal injection at South Dakota State Penitentiary in Sioux Falls. He was pronounced dead at 7:39 p.m. In his final statement, he addressed Donnivan Schaeffer's parents and said, "Edwin and Peggy Schaeffer, I forgive you for your anger and your hatred towards me, and I pray to God that he forgives you for your anger and your hatred towards me." He also thanked his legal team.

== See also ==
- Capital punishment in South Dakota
- Capital punishment in the United States
- List of most recent executions by jurisdiction
- List of people executed in South Dakota
- List of people executed in the United States in 2019

Executions carried out in South Dakota
Preceded by Rodney Berget October 29, 2018	Charles Rhines; November 4, 2019	Succeeded by most recent
Executions carried out in the United States
Preceded by Russell Bucklew – Missouri October 1, 2019	Charles Rhines – South Dakota; November 4, 2019	Succeeded by Justen Hall – Texas November 6, 2019
