= Robert Leroy Anderson =

American murderer and self-proclaimed serial killer (1969–2003)

- Born: December 4, 1969; Sioux Falls, South Dakota, U.S.
- Died: March 30, 2003 (aged 33); South Dakota State Penitentiary, Sioux Falls, South Dakota, U.S.
- Convictions: First degree murder (2 counts); First degree kidnapping First degree rape
- Penalty: Death (April 9, 1999)

Details
- Victims: 2+
- Span of crimes: 1994–1996
- Country: United States
- State: South Dakota
- Date apprehended: August 2, 1996
- Imprisoned at: South Dakota State Penitentiary

Robert Leroy Anderson (December 4, 1969 – March 30, 2003), known as the Duct Tape Killer, was an American murderer, rapist, and self-proclaimed serial killer who was sentenced to death in South Dakota for the murders of Larisa Dumansky and Piper Streyle in 1994 and 1996, respectively. Anderson remained on death row for nearly four years before committing suicide by hanging in 2003. Many believe Anderson would have continued to kill more women had he not been caught. In 2020, a book called, Duct Tape Killer: The True Inside Story of Sexual Sadist & Murderer Robert Leroy Anderson, was released, which revealed more information about Anderson's life and crime spree.

== Early life ==
Robert Leroy Anderson was born on December 4, 1969, at Sioux Valley Hospital in Sioux Falls, South Dakota, the third son of Leland and Ruth Anderson. While Anderson was still a boy, the family moved to Groton, where Anderson's younger sister was born. In 1976, the Anderson family returned to Sioux Falls and Anderson attended Hayward Elementary School. He later went to Washington High School.

In November 1986, Anderson moved to Kansas City, Missouri, with a friend's family. He enrolled in school but dropped out when his friend also quit. In 1987, he worked at an amusement park, operating a rollercoaster. One day, while he was at work, two trains on the ride collided, sending eight people to the hospital. Anderson was later cleared of any wrongdoing. In the summer of 1987, Anderson returned to South Dakota to live with his aunt and sister. He attended school but dropped out once again and went to work at a restaurant.

In February 1989, at the age of 19, Anderson married 17-year-old Elizabeth Ann Nielsen, a high school senior he had met through a friend. The couple later divorced shortly after the birth of their first child in 1990. In September 1991, Anderson had another child with a coworker named Elaine Edna Gardner, whom he had been dating. In December 1992, Anderson married Gardner. The couple had a second child in January 1994, and their third and final child in April 1995. In total, Anderson fathered four children, three sons and one daughter.

== Murders ==
=== Larisa Dumansky ===
On August 27, 1994, 29-year-old Larisa Dumansky, a Ukrainian immigrant living in Sioux Falls, disappeared after working a night shift at the John Morrell & Company meat packing plant. Her husband Bill waited for her at home and realized she had not returned as he was getting ready for work. He then began searching for her. He found her car parked outside the meat packing plant with a few flat tires and the keys left hanging in the door. He then called the police.

Police initially were suspicious of Bill, accusing him of having an argument with his wife and causing her to run off. Police then turned their attention to another suspect, a coworker of Larisa's who was in prison and on work release. The man claimed he had looked for her on the night of August 27 but had been unable to find her. As a result, he hitched a ride with another coworker back to the prison, where he was recorded checking back in, providing him with a clean alibi. Authorities continued to search for clues but after finding nothing Larisa's case went cold.

=== Piper Streyle ===
On the morning of July 26, 1996, a man, who would later be identified as Robert Leroy Anderson, stopped at the residence of Vance and Piper Streyle in Canistota. Anderson expressed an interest in a Bible day camp the couple ran and wrote his name and address on a piece of paper, which he gave to them.

On July 29, Anderson returned and abducted 28-year-old Piper Streyle in front of her two young children. According to one of the children, a "mean man" had entered the house and threatened the family with a gun. He drove a black vehicle with black wheels. Before she was kidnapped by Anderson, Piper told her children to run and hide. Later that day, Piper's husband, Vance, went to pick up their children from daycare, only to discover they had never arrived. Meanwhile, one of Piper's coworkers called the police when she failed to show up for work. Police arrived at the Streyle residence and found signs of a struggle, with the house in disarray. Piper's children were located alone, but unharmed, and her purse was found emptied on the floor.

Police questioned Streyle's children, who described a man entering the house with a gun and driving off in a black vehicle. Neighbors also recalled seeing a black utility truck in the area and some remembered seeing a man wearing jeans and a baseball cap who appeared nervous. This description of the man and the vehicle triggered Vance's memory; he recalled interacting with Anderson a few days earlier and realized that Anderson drove a similar vehicle and matched the neighbors' description. Vance provided police with Anderson's name, address, and a description.

== Investigation and kidnapping trial ==
On July 30, police identified Anderson as the person of interest and he was brought in for questioning. Anderson denied any involvement in Streyle's disappearance and refused to take a polygraph test. He admitted to having previously been at the house to enquire about their day camp. When police questioned why neighbors reported seeing him on the day of Streyle's disappearance, Anderson's story began to fall apart. Anderson admitted to stopping at the house on July 29 but claimed he went there to ask to use the couple's archery range. However, he then claimed he left without getting out of his vehicle as he had not seen any vehicles on the drive and believed the couple was not at home. However, police then informed him that other vehicles had been on the drive that day. Anderson also claimed he had not seen any children at the home. However, he later stated that he had knocked on the door of Streyle's home and got no answer, but later said he heard the voice of a child. When Anderson's interview concluded, authorities issued a warrant for his arrest.

On August 1, Anderson's trailer was searched and police found blood-stained jeans covered in semen. Police also found two keys to handcuffs, a pocket knife with shirt-like material still stuck in it, and a can of black spray paint. Police also searched his vehicle, a blue Ford Bronco, and found a toolbox, duct tape, and a dirt-covered shovel. Dog hairs matching the Streyle's family pet were also discovered. Additionally, human hairs were found on the floor in the back of the vehicle. Through DNA testing, these human hairs were confirmed as belonging to Piper Streyle.

Streyle's children were then brought in to identify a suspect. They both identified Anderson as the man who had come to their home on July 29 and threatened the family. On August 2, Anderson was subsequently arrested and charged with Streyle's kidnapping. A number of searches were conducted along the Big Sioux River in an attempt to locate Streyle. However, authorities only found two halves of her shirt, a clump of duct tape with more of Streyle's hair attached to it, as well as rope, chains, eyebolts, a vibrator, and a half-burned candle. It is assumed Anderson used these items to torture Streyle. Piper Streyle's body was ultimately never found.

On March 11, 1997, a woman named Amy Anderson (no relation) identified Robert Leroy Anderson as one of two men who had tried to abduct her on November 10, 1994. Amy Anderson claimed on the night in question that she was nearly abducted by two men in a maroon car, one of whom was Robert Leroy Anderson.

On May 8, 1997, Anderson was convicted of kidnapping Streyle with the intent to commit rape. In June, Anderson's wife Elaine asked for a divorce citing her husband's conviction as her reason for doing so. On July 18, 1997, Anderson was sentenced to life in prison.

== Revelation ==
In August 1996, after Anderson's initial arrest for Streyle's kidnapping, Larisa Dumansky's husband Bill was brought in by police to identify Anderson. Anderson worked night shifts at the John Morrell & Company meat packing plant and had previously worked with both Larisa and Bill between 1991 and 1992. Bill clarified that Anderson had not worked with Larisa at the time of her disappearance back in 1994, but he recalled Anderson as a nasty and dirty-minded man who liked to talk about sex. Following the discovery, police started looking at whether Anderson could also be responsible for Dumansky's disappearance.

On May 20, 1997, not long after Anderson was convicted of Streyle's kidnapping, a man named Glen Marcus Walker, who was Anderson's lifelong friend, led law enforcement to a shallow grave site in McCook County near Lake Vermilion. The grave site contained shell casings and bone fragments. DNA testing was carried out and showed the bones were a genetic match to Larisa Dumansky. Police believe Anderson and Walker buried Dumansky in the grave. A few days later on May 30, police searched Anderson's mother's home but found nothing.

In August 1997, Anderson's cellmate, Jeremy Brunner, contacted the attorney general's office and provided key information that Anderson had shared with him. Brunner claimed that Anderson had boasted about kidnapping, raping, and murdering both Dumansky and Streyle. Anderson told Brunner he kidnapped Dumansky at knifepoint with Walker's help but Walker went home after getting scared. Anderson then raped Dumansky in a field in a rural area and after doing so wrapped her head with duct tape, covering her mouth and nose so she suffocated. He then raped and murdered her alone, then went to get Walker, who assisted in her burial. In Streyle's case, after kidnapping her at gunpoint in front of her children, Anderson handcuffed her in the back of his vehicle, raped her, strangled her to death, then disposed of her body in the Big Sioux River.

Anderson confided in Brunner because he wanted him to assist in a scheme of his in which he was hoping to frame someone else for the murders and have his former friend Walker killed. He gave Brunner a diagram of his mother's house and pointed to where personal items of Dumansky's and Streyle's could be found. He also pointed to the location of a gun. He also gave Brunner a description of Walker and a map with directions to his home so a hitman could murder him.

Instead of helping Anderson, Brunner turned the information over to the authorities. On August 26, 1997, authorities searched Anderson's mother's home again and followed the diagram Brunner had given them. This time, they found key pieces of evidence, including a necklace worn by Dumansky, a wedding ring belonging to Streyle, a 9mm pistol, two sets of handcuffs, and a partially loaded gun magazine. On September 4, Anderson was charged with the rape and murder of Streyle and the kidnapping and murder of Dumansky. On November 13, Brunner was released from prison for assisting the authorities, however, he returned on December 2, as he was arrested on drug charges.

== Murder trial ==
On September 14, 1998, Anderson's trial was moved to Sioux Falls at the request of his lawyers. On January 19, 1999, jury selection began. On February 3, opening arguments in the murder trial began and prosecutors began presenting their case.

On April 6, 1999, the jury returned a verdict against Anderson and found him guilty of kidnapping and murdering Dumansky and raping and murdering Streyle. On April 9, the jury determined Anderson should be sentenced to death. On May 4, 1999, Anderson was formally sentenced to death.

Glen Marcus Walker, Anderson's lifelong friend, was arrested on August 22, 1998, on charges that he aided Anderson in abducting Dumansky and was involved in the attempted abduction of Amy Anderson. He was charged with attempted kidnapping, attempted first-degree murder, conspiracy to commit kidnapping, and conspiracy to commit first-degree murder. Ultimately, he was sentenced to thirty years in prison after being charged with attempted kidnapping, accessory to kidnapping and first-degree murder, and conspiracy to kidnap. In 2016, he was released from prison for good behavior.

== Death ==
On March 30, 2003, Anderson committed suicide by hanging at the South Dakota State Penitentiary in Sioux Falls. He was found hanging in a disciplinary cell just after 2:00 a.m. Prison staff began performing CPR but Anderson was pronounced dead at a Sioux Falls hospital a short time later. Anderson's father had also killed himself a few months prior from a self-inflicted gunshot wound to the head in December 2002.

Larisa Dumansky's widower, Bill Dumansky, reacted to Anderson's death by saying he would not cheer another family's loss. He said, "Somewhere I'm saddened for his family and for him. Instead of doing good and helping people, he stole daughters, wives and worst of all, mothers."

== In popular culture ==
In the Supernatural season 14 episode "The Scar" (2018), Sam Winchester (Jared Padalecki) and Sheriff Jody Mills (Kim Rhodes) mention Anderson while discussing a string of decapitations in Sioux Falls, South Dakota, noting that they initially suspected a human serial killer—which would have been the city's first since Anderson.

In 2020, a book about Anderson's life and crimes called, Duct Tape Killer: The True Inside Story of Sexual Sadist & Murderer Robert Leroy Anderson, was released by authors Phil and Sandy Hamman. The pair also authored two books about the 1973 Gitchie Manitou murders. The Hammans were aided by Larry Long, a former South Dakota Attorney General who helped prosecute the case against Anderson. Long assisted in writing the book and used his case files and personal knowledge to help tell the story. The book was released on January 15, 2020. Some of the proceeds of the book were donated to help victims of domestic violence.

In 2022, Piper Streyle's daughter, Shaina Fertig, who witnessed her mother's kidnapping and was only 3 years old when her mother was murdered, published a book called, A Call to Remember: The Girl Who Wouldn't Testify and the Woman Who Will. The book documents Fertig's life and talks about how when she was young she was asked to testify against Anderson in a court of law but ultimately chose not to. In the book, Fertig affirms she no longer wishes to be the girl who would not testify and instead will be the woman who will testify, speak, and tell her story.

== See also ==
- Capital punishment in South Dakota
