= Capital punishment in South Dakota =

Capital punishment is a legal penalty in the U.S. state of South Dakota.

As of November 2019, five condemned, all white males, have been executed since capital punishment was reinstated in the state in 1979. Four of the five men executed waived their normal appeals and chose to be put to death. A further two men killed themselves while on South Dakota's death row.

== Legal process ==
When the prosecution seeks the death penalty, the sentence is decided by the jury and must be unanimous.

In case of a hung jury during the penalty phase of the trial, a life sentence is issued, even if a single juror opposed death (there is no retrial).

The governor has the power of clemency with respect to death sentences.

Death row is located at the South Dakota State Penitentiary located in Sioux Falls. Lethal injection is the only method of execution provided by statutes.

== Capital crimes ==
First degree murder is a Class A felony in South Dakota, punishable by death or life imprisonment without parole when the defendant is at least 18 years old. It is the only Class A felony in the state and can only be punished with death when the crime involves any of the following aggravating factors:

1. The murder was committed by a person with a prior record of conviction for a Class A or Class B felony, or the offense of murder was committed by a person who has a felony conviction for a crime of violence;
2. The defendant by the defendant's act knowingly created a great risk of death to more than one person in a public place by means of a weapon or device which would normally be hazardous to the lives of more than one person;
3. The murder was committed for the benefit of the defendant or another, for the purpose of receiving money or any other thing of monetary value;
4. The murder was committed on a judicial officer, former judicial officer, prosecutor, or former prosecutor while such prosecutor, former prosecutor, judicial officer, or former judicial officer was engaged in the performance of such person's official duties or where a major part of the motivation for the offense came from the official actions of such judicial officer, former judicial officer, prosecutor, or former prosecutor;
5. The defendant caused or directed another to commit murder or committed murder as an agent or employee of another person;
6. The murder was outrageously or wantonly vile, horrible, or inhuman in that it involved torture, depravity of mind, or an aggravated battery to the victim. Any murder is wantonly vile, horrible, and inhuman if the victim is less than 13 years of age;
7. The murder was committed against a law enforcement officer, employee of a corrections institution, or firefighter while engaged in the performance of such person's official duties;
8. The murder was committed by a person in, or who has escaped from, the lawful custody of a law enforcement officer or place of lawful confinement;
9. The murder was committed for the purpose of avoiding, interfering with, or preventing a lawful arrest or custody in a place of lawful confinement, of the defendant or another;
10. The murder was committed in the course of manufacturing, distributing, or dispensing illegal substances.

== History ==
South Dakota executed four men between 1877 and its admission to the union in 1889, and 10 men between that time and the abolition of South Dakota's death penalty in 1915. Each of these death sentences were carried out by hanging. The territory carried out one confirmed wrongful execution. In 1882, Thomas Egan was hanged for the murder of his wife, Mary Egan. However, his stepdaughter, Catherine Egan, made a verifiable deathbed confession to the murder in 1927. She admitted that she and her husband had conspired to frame Egan. Thomas Egan was posthumously pardoned in 1993.

Following public outrage over the brutal murder of a young teacher by two teenage boys, who had kidnapped, shot, and beat her with a hammer, the death penalty was reinstated in 1939 and electric chair became the sole method. The procurement of an electric chair proved difficult for the State: in 1942, as United States entered the Second World War, the warden of the South Dakota State Penitentiary sought help from the War Production Board to have one built, but his request was denied. Two men were awaiting execution in 1942, but the state did not have an electric chair available. The warden of the South Dakota State Penitentiary, William Jamerson, traveled to Vermont in 1942, seeking to borrow that state's electric chair for use in anticipated executions in South Dakota, however it was determined that a difference in electrical conditions in South Dakota would preclude use of the Vermont chair. The warden was able to convince the state of Illinois to lend their electric chair from Stateville Prison to the South Dakota State Penitentiary the following month.

However, the two death sentences were commuted and no executions occurred in it in South Dakota. South Dakota returned the Illinois electric chair after receiving clearance from the War Production Board to obtain materials necessary to build their own electric chair in February 1944.

The only person ever to be judicially electrocuted in South Dakota was George Sitts, who was put to death on April 8, 1947, at the South Dakota State Penitentiary. South Dakota was the second-to-last state to adopt electrocution as an execution method, and Sitts' execution was South Dakota's last until after Furman.

On March 24, 1967, Thomas James White Hawk, an 18-year-old premed student at the University of South Dakota, and his friend, William Stands, went to the home of 63-year-old jeweler, James Yeado. White Hawk said he planned to rob Yeado, but killed him instead, after which Stands fled. White Hawk then tied up Yeado's wife and raped her twice. In 1968, he pleaded guilty to first degree murder and was sentenced to death, becoming the first person to be sentenced to death in the state since George Sitts in 1946. The crime drew national attention after NBC made a documentary comparing the cases of White Hawk, who was Native American, and Baxter Berry, an elderly white man and the son of former Governor Tom Berry, who had recently been acquitted of killing Norman Little Brave, an unarmed 28-year-old Native American man, on his farm and leaving him to die. Berry had been charged only two months later, after the victim's wife filed a complaint, and was acquitted on grounds of self-defense. Berry's lawyer, Sam Masten, had made racist remarks after the trial, blaming it on "political do-gooders" who "don't know anything about Indians". He claimed that Berry was fearing for his life and would have otherwise been "another Yeado", referencing the man whom White Hawk had killed.

At a hearing with the South Dakota Board of Pardons and Paroles, White Hawk testified that he believed his father--who died in a car accident when White Hawk was 10--had beaten his mother to death. He later attended segregated American Indian boarding schools run by the Bureau of Indian Affairs and an Episcopal church school in Mission, South Dakota. While awaiting sentencing, a psychiatrist had testified that White Hawk had a mental disorder. The board recommended that White Hawk's death sentence be commuted to life in prison. Their decision stated that while a death sentence would be entirely justifiable for the crimes committed by White Hawk, he had chosen to plead guilty and there was no objection to clemency by judge. Governor Frank Farrar defended the state's death penalty and denied any claims of anti-Indigenous racism, but accepted the recommendation, describing White Hawk as the product of a "tragic social environment" and questioning his mental stability. White Hawk died in prison on May 7, 1997, at the age of 49. In the 1980s, Farrar said White Hawk deserved to be executed and implied that he had only commuted his death sentence out of fear of a Native American uprising which potentially could have resulted in many more deaths. Shortly after White Hawk died in prison, he reiterated this position, but said he did not regret granting clemency.

"It was in the era of the Vietnam uprisings, and all kinds of segments of our population were demonstrating. I thought there would be more deaths if I took his life. That's the only reason I decided to do what I did."

On January 1, 1979, Governor Bill Janklow signed South Dakota's post-Furman death penalty statute. It was the first act he signed as governor. All subsequent executions have been by lethal injection. The first occurred in 2007 with the execution of Elijah Page. Only four others have been executed since, the most recent occurring in 2019. A further two men, including self-proclaimed serial killer Robert Leroy Anderson, killed themselves while on death row. As of 2024, only one death row inmate, Briley Piper, who was also Elijah Page's co-defendant, remains on death row.

In 2014, the House committee of South Dakota debated on a bill to abolish the death penalty in the state. Lynette Johnson, the widow of corrections officer Ronald Johnson (who was murdered by two inmates in 2011), urged the committee to not repeal the death penalty, stating that it should continue and apply to the most dangerous of offenders for the protection of society. Former prosecutor Marty Jackley similarly supported the efforts of Lynette to keep the death penalty. In the end, the bill to repeal capital punishment was narrowly rejected by a majority vote of 7–6, allowing South Dakota to retain the death penalty. Ultimately, the two prisoners, Eric Robert and Rodney Berget, were found guilty of murdering Johnson and executed by lethal injection on October 15, 2012 and October 29, 2018, respectively.

A second bill to repeal the death penalty in South Dakota was similarly rejected by the Senate State Affairs Committee in 2015.

In 2025, Senator Jamie Smith sponsored a bill that sought to abolish capital punishment. However, the death penalty was ultimately retained and the bill failed to pass.

== See also ==
- List of people executed in South Dakota
- List of death row inmates in the United States § South Dakota
- Crime in South Dakota
