= South Dakota Department of Corrections =

Government agency in South Dakota, United States

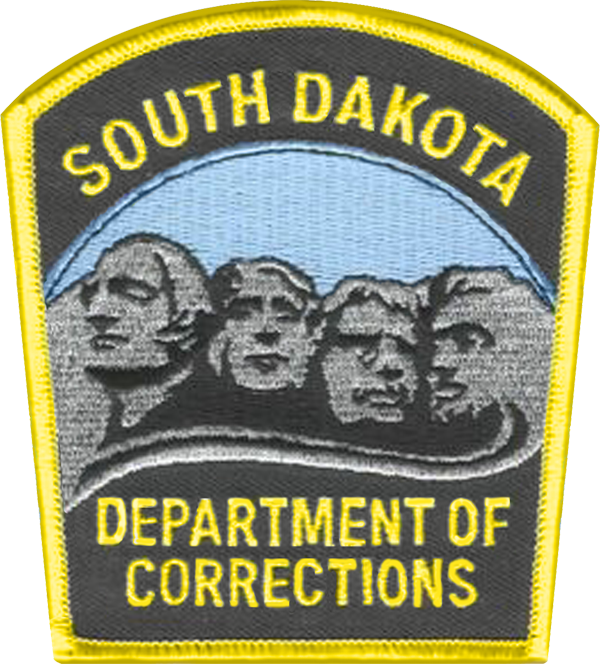

Agency overview
- Formed: July 1989
- Preceding agency: Board of Charities and Corrections, 1890–1989
- Jurisdiction: South Dakota
- Headquarters: Pierre, South Dakota
- Annual budget: $106,982,478 (2011)
- Agency executive: Kellie Wasko, Secretary of Corrections
- Parent agency: State of South Dakota
- Website: http://doc.sd.gov/

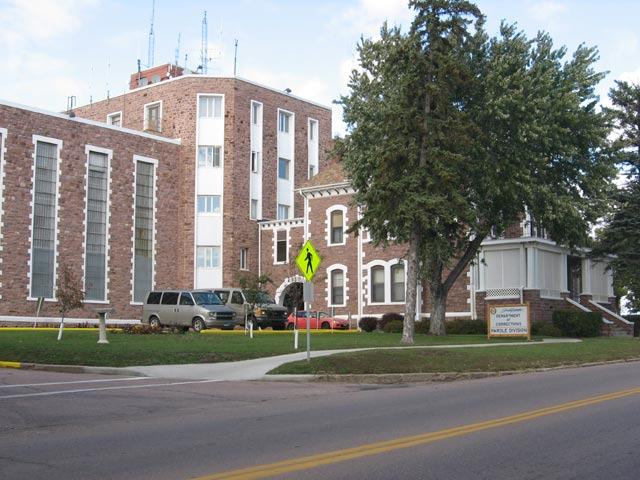
South Dakota State Penitentiary

The South Dakota Department of Corrections is the agency that operates state prisons in the US state of South Dakota. It has its headquarters in Pierre.

== Adult prisons ==
- Mike Durfee State Prison in Springfield
- South Dakota State Penitentiary and its Jameson Annex, both in Sioux Falls
- South Dakota Women's Prison in Pierre (inmate capacity 452)
- Rapid City Minimum Center in Rapid City
- Yankton Minimum Center in Yankton

== Juvenile corrections ==
The South Dakota corrections system includes the Juvenile Corrections System, its network of juvenile facilities.

The State Treatment and Rehabilitation Academy (STAR Academy) is located in unincorporated Custer County, 4.5 miles (7.2 km) south of Custer on U.S. Highway 385. STAR Evergreen High School serves as the middle and high school for delinquent youth. The STAR campus includes several units. The STAR Admissions Unit processes new arrivals. The Youth Challenge Center and the Patrick H. Brady Academy serve young men. The QUEST and Excel programs serve young women.

The West Farm in unincorporated Minnehaha County, near Sioux Falls, serves as the juvenile transitional care facility for boys who are about to go back into their communities. STAR Academy and Patrick H Brady Academy closed in April 2016. All juveniles are housed in private placements supervised by Juvenile Community Corrections staff.

== Prison gang activity ==
Over the ten years leading to 2010, prison staff identified approximately 150 different gangs in South Dakota's state prisons. Of those, eight are currently active at the South Dakota State Penitentiary in Sioux Falls. Most have racial allegiances, like the Gangster Disciples, an African American street gang; and the Sureños, a Hispanic street gang. Warden Doug Weber told KSFY-TV that two gangs actually formed at the South Dakota State Penitentiary: the Family Brotherhood is an Aryan gang and the Red Brotherhood is a Native American gang. Other Native American Gangs in South Dakota State Prison. The BoyZ, Native OutlawZ, Nothing But Money, Warlords, Red Brotherhood, and Native Gangster Disciple

== See also ==
- List of law enforcement agencies in South Dakota
- List of United States state correction agencies
- List of U.S. state prisons
