= South Dakota State Penitentiary =

State prison in Sioux Falls, South Dakota, USA

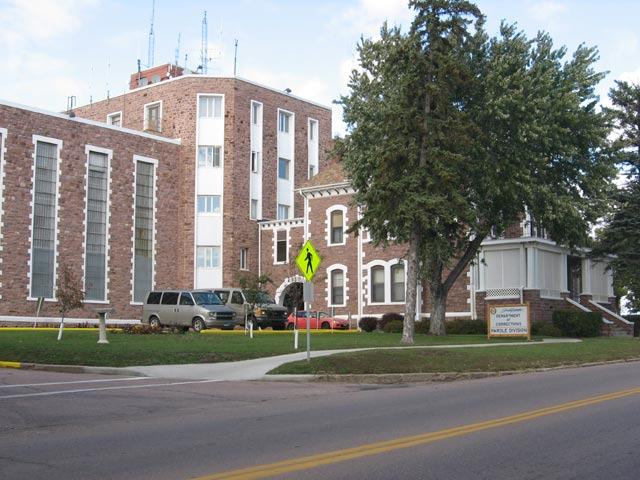
- The prison from the west, as it looks today
- Interactive map of South Dakota State Penitentiary
- Location: Sioux Falls, South Dakota; 43°34′01″N 96°43′30″W
- Status: Open
- Security class: Maximum, Medium, Minimum
- Opened: 1881

The South Dakota State Penitentiary is a state prison located in South Dakota's largest city, Sioux Falls. The building's industry shop makes several things for the state, including woodwork and license plates. The State Penitentiary also houses South Dakota's death row for men and the state's execution chamber.

== History ==
The South Dakota State Penitentiary is located in northern Sioux Falls, occupying approximately thirty acres. First constructed as a territorial prison in 1881, it became the South Dakota State Penitentiary when South Dakota was granted statehood in 1889. Though a large portion of the original buildings remain, numerous structural changes have occurred over the years. The main Penitentiary facility contains three housing units. The G. Norton Jameson Annex began housing inmates in February 1993. The Jameson Annex contains three housing units within a secure perimeter and a minimum security unit known as Unit C, which is located outside the perimeter fence.

Inmate employment within the Penitentiary falls into two basic categories; institutional support and prison industries. Institutional support includes those employed in food service, as clerks for various departments, as cell orderlies and those working in maintenance. Prison Industries consists of upholstery, printing, sign, decal, license plates, carpentry, book bindery, machine shop, Braille unit, garments and data entry. All but the garment and data entry work is done at the Penitentiary. Most of the work is done for government agencies. Inmates are offered literacy, Adult Basic Education and GED classes.

The penitentiary was designed by Wallace L. Dow and constructed in 1882. The warden’s residence was completed in 1884. In the 1890s, prisoners quarried stone to build a wall to enclose the prison yard. In 1881, Richard Pettigrew lobbied for and succeeded in getting a federal appropriation to construct the jail in Sioux Falls, which can be seen from the Big Sioux River.

On March 6, 1936, a man identifying himself as Claude Carrier, during a visit to his brother Harold, smuggled two revolvers into the penitentiary and held up staff. The pair obtained rifles and a machine gun before leaving with another inmate, Phil Ray, and warden Eugene Reiley as a hostage. After carjacking two women outside the prison, they drove north out of Sioux Falls. They traded gunfire with police twice, first on a side road two miles north of the city, and again on the highway four miles north, where the pursuit ended with the Carrier brothers' surrender. Ray was killed at the scene, and Warden Reiley would die of his wounds before reaching the hospital. A civilian, Berlan Meisel, who was a victim of a second attempted carjacking, would also succumb to a gunshot wound hours after the melee, while his fiancée was wounded in the face. Claude and sheriff's deputy George Collins were seriously wounded, and another civilian lost a finger to a stray bullet. During interrogation three days later, Claude admitted to actually being Floyd Lindberg, a friend of Ray's who posed as the brother of Harold Carrier to gain entry.

On July 11, 2007, the first post-Gregg execution took place at the penitentiary. 25-year-old Elijah Page was executed via lethal injection for the murder of Chester Poage. It was the first execution carried out in South Dakota in over sixty years.

On April 12, 2011, Correctional Officer Ronald "R.J." Johnson was bludgeoned to death by two inmates who were trying to escape. Both inmates were arrested within the confines of the prison grounds. They were subsequently sentenced to death. A third convict was sentenced to life imprisonment for providing materials in the killing. The first convict, Eric Donald Robert, was executed successfully on October 16, 2012, using South Dakota's new single-drug lethal injection method. The second convict, Rodney Scott Berget, was executed on October 29, 2018.

== Replacement facility ==
In October 2023, the South Dakota Department of Corrections closed on a real estate purchase of two 160 acre parcels of land in Dayton Township in Lincoln County on which they plan to construct a new men's facility to replace the existing penitentiary in Sioux Falls.

== Notable prisoners ==
- Charlie Adelson - convicted in 2023 of first-degree murder for orchestrating the 2014 killing of Florida State University law professor Dan Markel and sentenced to life in prison without the possibility of parole.
- Robert Leroy Anderson – convicted of the murders of Larisa Dumansky and Piper Streyle; hanged himself on March 30, 2003.
- Rodney Berget – convicted of the murder of Ronald Johnson; executed by lethal injection on October 29, 2018.
- Darrell Brooks Jr. - convicted of Waukesha parade attack. Serving multiple life sentences.
- Darrell Hoadley – convicted of the murder of Chester Poage; serving a life sentence.
- William Kunnecke – a German-American serial killer. Serving a sentence of life imprisonment, he escaped on September 3, 1919, and was never captured.
- Donald Moeller – convicted of the abduction, rape, and murder of Becky O'Connell; executed by lethal injection on October 30, 2012.
- Michael Nordman – convicted of the murder of Ronald Johnson; serving two consecutive life sentences for the murder and a separate case of child rape.
- Elijah Page – convicted of the murder of Chester Poage; executed by lethal injection on July 11, 2007.
- Briley Piper – convicted of the murder of Chester Poage; only person on death row in South Dakota.
- Charles Rhines – convicted of the murder of Donnivan Schaffer; executed by lethal injection on November 4, 2019.
- Eric Robert – convicted of the murder of Ronald Johnson; executed by lethal injection on October 15, 2012.
