= 1998 Pulitzer Prize =

Awards for journalism and related fields

A listing of the Pulitzer Prize award winners for 1998:

== Journalism ==
Public Service	Grand Forks Herald (N.D.)	" ... for its sustained and informative coverage, vividly illustrated with photographs, that helped hold its community together in the wake of flooding, a blizzard and a fire that devastated much of the city, including the newspaper plant itself..."
Beat Reporting	Linda Greenhouse of The New York Times	" ... for her consistently illuminating coverage of the United States Supreme Court..."
Spot News Photography	Martha Rial of the Pittsburgh Post-Gazette	" ... for her life-affirming portraits of survivors of the conflicts in Rwanda and Burundi."
Breaking News Reporting	Staff of the Los Angeles Times	" ... for its comprehensive coverage of a botched bank robbery and subsequent police shoot-out in North Hollywood, Los Angeles."
Commentary	Mike McAlary of the New York Daily News	" ... for reporting on the brutalization of a Haitian immigrant by police officers at a Brooklyn stationhouse."
Criticism	Michiko Kakutani of The New York Times	" ... for her passionate, intelligent writing on books and contemporary literature."
Editorial Cartooning	Stephen P. Breen of Asbury Park Press (Neptune City, New Jersey)	
Editorial Writing	Bernard L. Stein of The Riverdale Press, a New York City weekly journal	" ... for his gracefully-written editorials on politics and other issues affecting New York City residents."
Explanatory Reporting	Paul Salopek of the Chicago Tribune	" ... for his enlightening profile of the Human Genome Diversity Project, which seeks to chart the genetic relationship among all people."
Feature Photography	Clarence Williams of the Los Angeles Times	" ... for his powerful images documenting the plight of young children with parents addicted to alcohol and drugs."
Feature Writing	Thomas French of the St. Petersburg Times	" ... for his detailed and compassionate narrative portrait of a mother and two daughters slain on a Florida vacation, and the three-year investigation into their murders and eventual capture of Oba Chandler."
International Reporting	Staff of The New York Times	" ... for its revealing series that profiled the corrosive effects of drug corruption in Mexico.
Investigative Reporting	Gary Cohn and Will Englund of The Baltimore Sun	" ... for their compelling series on the international shipbreaking industry, that revealed the dangers posed to workers and the environment when discarded ships are dismantled."
National Reporting	Russell Carollo and Jeff Nesmith of Dayton Daily News	" ... for their reporting that disclosed dangerous flaws and mismanagement in the military health care system and prompted reforms."

== Letters ==
- Biography or Autobiography
  - Personal History by Katharine Graham (Alfred A. Knopf)
- Fiction
  - American Pastoral by Philip Roth (Houghton Mifflin)
- History
  - Summer for the Gods: The Scopes Trial and America's Continuing Debate Over Science and Religion by Edward Larson (BasicBooks)
- General Nonfiction
  - Guns, Germs and Steel: The Fates of Human Societies by Jared Diamond (W.W. Norton)
- Poetry
  - Black Zodiac by Charles Wright (Farrar)
- Drama
  - How I Learned to Drive by Paula Vogel (TCG)
- Music
  - String Quartet No. 2 (musica instrumentalis) by Aaron Jay Kernis (Associated Music Publishers)

Premiered on January 19, 1990, at Merkin Concert Hall, New York City, by The Lark Quartet.

== Special Awards and Citations ==
- Special Citation
  - George Gershwin - Awarded posthumously to George Gershwin, commemorating the centennial year of his birth, for his distinguished and enduring contributions to American music.
