= Symphony No. 4 (Kernis) =

Symphony by Aaron Jay Kernis

Aaron Jay Kernis's Symphony No. 4 Chromelodeon was written in 2018 on a joint commission from the New England Conservatory of Music for the sesquicentennial anniversary of its founding, the Nashville Symphony, and the Bellingham Festival of Music. Its world premiere was given by the New England Conservatory of Music Philharmonia conducted by Hugh Wolff at the Symphony Hall, Boston, on April 18, 2018.

== Composition ==
The symphony has a duration of approximately 26 minutes and is cast in three movements:

1. Out of Silence
2. Thorn Rose | Weep Freedom (After Handel)
3. Fanfare Chomelodia

=== Background ===
The title of the symphony "Chromelodeon" does not refer to the musical instrument by Harry Partch or any band of that name. Rather, as Kernis wrote in the score program note, "for me it has a particular meaning: Chroma-, relating to the chromatic scale of notes, or intensity of/or produced with color; Melodi-, melody, a succession of tones that produce a distinct phrase or idea; and -eon, one who performs. In other words, chromatic, colorful, melodic music performed by an orchestra."

The first movement "Out of Silence" was inspired in part by two books named Silence: the first is a work about mindfulness written by the Thiền Buddhist monk Thích Nhất Hạnh and second is an essay collection written by the American composer John Cage. The second movement "Thorn Rose | Weep Freedom (After Handel)" is melodically influenced by the music of the Classical-era composer George Frideric Handel; its title is derived from the aria "Lascia ch'io pianga" used the operas Almira and Rinaldo.

=== Instrumentation ===
The work is scored for an orchestra comprising three flutes (3rd doubling piccolo), three oboes (3rd doubling cor anglais), three clarinets (2nd doubling E♭ clarinet; 3rd doubling bass clarinet), three bassoons (3rd doubling contrabassoon), four horns, three trumpets, two trombones, bass trombone, tuba, timpani, five percussionists, piano (doubling celesta), harp, and strings.

== Reception ==
Laurence Vittes of Gramophone gave the symphony a positive review, observing that "you can feel the times in the music by the influences (Nhat Hanh, John Cage and Handel) and the themes. The first movement begins with instruments that glow in the dark, the winds making like an organ, a sinuous cello assaulted by shrieks. The second movement reflects on the words of 'Lascia ch'io pianga' in Rinaldo, 'Let me weep over my cruel fate, and that I long for freedom'." Joseph E. Morgan of the Music City Review also praised the piece, writing, "With his Fourth Symphony, entitled Chromelodeon, [Kernis] has created a world that is richly chromatic, marked by unease, contemplative intensity and, in the first movement particularly, obsessive rumination."

Geoff Brown of BBC Music Magazine was more critical of the piece, however, remarking, "Kernis's energy and technical skills remain startling, but his struggle for symphonic significance exposes more limits than strengths in his use of the subtitle's constituent parts (chromatics, colour, melody). Notes pile up to a choking degree and the finale is empty chatter, while the central slow movement that chews over Handel's aria 'Laschia ch'io pianga' remains more meretricious than meaningful. Luckily, the fretful first movement, labelled 'Out of Silence' and opened with tinkling bell sounds, is satisfyingly intriguing."

== Recording ==
A recording of the symphony, performed by the Nashville Symphony conducted by Giancarlo Guerrero, was released on album together with Kernis's Color Wheel through Naxos in June 2020.
