= MBIS =

MBIS may refer to:

- Mbis, ceremonial pole from New Guinea
- Marist Brothers International School, school in Kobe, Japan

== See also ==
- MBI (disambiguation)
