= Oba Chandler =

American mass murderer and suspected serial rapist (1946–2011)

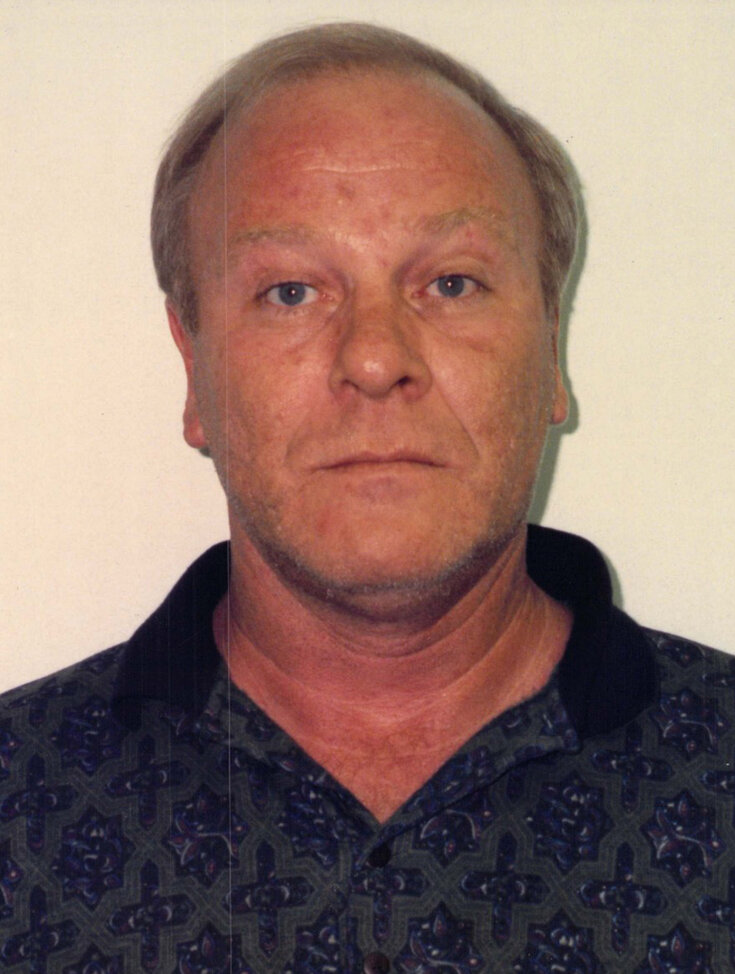
- Chandler's 1992 mugshot
- Born: Oba Chandler Jr. October 11, 1946; Cincinnati, Ohio, U.S.
- Died: November 15, 2011 (aged 65); Florida State Prison, Raiford, Florida, U.S.
- Other names: Jim Wright; Dave Posner
- Occupation: Aluminum siding contractor
- Status: Executed by lethal injection
- Convictions: First degree murder (3 counts); Armed robbery (2 counts); Being a felon in possession of a firearm
- Penalty: Death (November 4, 1994)

Details
- Victims: 4 murder victims
- Date: June 1, 1989 (Rogers family murders); November 27, 1990 (Murder of Ivelisse Berrios-Beguerisse)
- Country: United States
- State: Florida
- Date apprehended: September 24, 1992

Oba Chandler Jr. (October 11, 1946 – November 15, 2011) was an American mass murderer, rapist, robber, and fraudster who was convicted and executed for the June 1989 murders of the Rogers family, consisting of Joan Rogers and her two teenage daughters Michelle and Christe, whose bodies were found floating in Tampa Bay, Florida, with their hands and feet bound. Autopsies showed the victims had been thrown into the water while still alive, with ropes tied to a concrete block around their necks. The case became high-profile in 1992 when local police posted billboards bearing enlarged images of the suspect's handwriting recovered from a pamphlet in the victims' car. Chandler was identified as the killer when his neighbor and three people that were suing him recognized the handwriting.

Prior to his arrest, Chandler worked as an unlicensed aluminum-siding contractor. Against the advice of his attorneys, he testified in his own defense, saying he had met the victims and had given them directions. Chandler said he never saw them again, except in newspaper coverage and on the billboards set up by authorities. Police originally theorized that two men were involved in the murders, but this was discounted once Chandler was arrested. Following his conviction, Chandler was incarcerated at Union Correctional Institution. During his seventeen years of incarceration until his execution, he did not have any visitors.

Chandler was executed on November 15, 2011. He wrote a last statement to prison officials: "You are killing a [sic] innocent man today". The statement was read at a post-execution news conference. In February 2014, DNA evidence identified Chandler as the murderer of Ivelisse Berrios-Beguerisse, who was found dead in Coral Springs, Florida, on November 27, 1990.

== Early life ==
=== Childhood and teenage years ===
Chandler was born on October 11, 1946, in Cincinnati, Ohio, as the fourth of five children born to Oba Chandler Sr. and Margaret Johnson. He was known as Junior to his family. Oba Sr. was described as a "full-blood Indian of Cherokee and perhaps Lakota descent", who had abandoned his first wife and four sons in Kentucky. To the children in his second marriage, Oba Sr. was a strict disciplinarian who physically punished his children if they misbehaved or, in the case of his daughters, dressed inappropriately. On May 31, 1957, when Chandler was 10, his father hanged himself in the basement of the family's apartment. According to Chandler's cousin, at the funeral the following day, every time the gravedigger piled dirt on the coffin, Chandler jumped into the open grave and stomped the soil, muttering "He didn't have to do that"; other family members denied the account. After his father's death, Chandler began skipping school and staying out late. He joined a group of neighborhood boys who encouraged him to partake in small criminal acts, such as bicycle theft and shooting BB guns at passing cars.

Throughout his teenage years, Chandler and his siblings were frequently given into the care of other relatives by his mother and in 1960, he was sent to live with his older sister Helen and her husband in Tampa, Florida. Chandler refused to attend school, due to which Helen tried to make her brother take a factory job at her husband's workplace instead. On the day of a planned job interview, Chandler used the money meant for a bus fare to play pinball, returning home to his sister only two hours later to ask for more money. During the ensuing argument, Chandler punched a window, after which Helen gave her brother into the custody of their oldest sister, Alma. He lived with Alma and her husband Robert Docter in nearby Pinellas Park for a few months, briefly attending Pinellas Park Middle School before lapsing attendance. Chandler returned to Cincinnati to live with other relatives, during which time, at age 14, Chandler stole a car for joyriding. While still a juvenile, Chandler was arrested a total of twenty times, mostly for property-related crime and one instance of assault and battery. He attended Cutter Junior High School in Cincinnati until the eighth grade. Chandler returned to Pinellas Park in 1963 with his mother and stepfather, subsequently working with his brother-in-law at a lathing company in Largo. Between 1963 and 1965, Chandler had three children with two girlfriends, but refused to take responsibility in raising them.

=== Prior criminal career ===
On December 27, 1965, Chandler left home to travel to Jacksonville and enlist in the United States Marine Corps. He was disciplined for the first time within a week of his arrival on Parris Island for training and in March 1966, he deserted while at Camp Lejeune. Chandler was arrested in Saint Paul, Minnesota in summer of the same year, serving six months of hard labor at Camp Lejeune and receiving a general discharge on January 11, 1967. Throughout the rest of the year, he lived in Minnesota, Wisconsin and Ohio, where he was noted for larceny and robbery offenses. He subsequently travelled around the midwestern and southeastern United States as a conman, living under various false identities and fathering four more children with four different women. Between November 1968 and February 1973, Chandler was arrested six times for non-violent offenses, including fraud and theft, but also a peeping tom offense, when it was alleged that he was caught masturbating while spying on a woman through a window in her home. Another notable case occurred on January 28, 1969, when Chandler broke into a beauty salon in Cincinnati and stole 21 wigs, worth over $1,300 (equivalent to $11,413 in 2025), which resulted in an indictment on a charge of receiving and concealing stolen goods. He was last recorded in Cincinnati in 1975, when he obtained a driver's license in the city.

On February 2, 1976, Chandler and an accomplice broke into the home of a couple in Daytona Beach, after spotting them on a boat with a large amount of money the prior day. While the accomplice tied up the husband with electrical cable, Chandler took the woman into the bedroom, where he made her strip to her underwear, tied her up, and rubbed the barrel of his revolver across her stomach. The burglars stole some cash, a rifle, a shotgun and a Doberman Pinscher. Chandler was arrested two weeks later at his uncle's apartment in the city. He was charged with robbery, burglary, kidnapping, and drug possession, the latter after an arresting officer found marijuana on his person. During his 1977 trial, he pled guilty to a single count of armed robbery as part of a plea deal, receiving a ten-year prison sentence, which he served at Doctor's Inlet Road Prison near Palatka. During his stay, it was determined that Chandler had an IQ of above 120, albeit with a poor reading level, with Chandler voicing an interest in obtaining parole. Officials also noted that Chandler professed strong Christian beliefs, though he showed only "mediocre" interest in prison chapel service. He escaped five months into his sentence while working as part of a construction crew on Interstate 95 in Duval County.

Chandler remained in Florida, generally staying in and around Orlando, presenting aliases, most commonly "James Thomas Wright", fake occupations, such as X-ray technician, mechanical draftsman, apartment manager, and aluminum contractor, and false home states. Between April 1978 and July 1981, he was arrested three times, twice for loitering and prowling and once for a vending machine theft. In the first offense, which took place in Altamonte Springs, a woman had accused Chandler of spying on her through a window in her bedroom. Chandler was convicted each time and sentenced to monetary fines and according to police, he provided false documentations, including identity cards and Social Security numbers, and even gave a fingerprint sample, which was never matched despite Chandler already having a criminal record. Some of his family members were aware of his fugitive status and false identities, but sheltered him throughout the years. By 1982, Chandler, as "Jim Wright", had settled in Maitland with a girlfriend, running a legitimate aluminum-siding business out of his home. Simultaneously, he ran a counterfeit money operation, producing fake $20 bills. Since 1981, he had also been a police informant to Orlando's Metropolitan Bureau of Investigation under the Wright alias. Although the record was destroyed as a routine measure by the time of the Rogers family murders, police archives and a 1983 parole request letter by Chandler indicated that he was given monetary compensation in return for tip-offs that led to police raids on "X-rated bookstores".

In May 1982, two teenagers were arrested for attempting to buy tickets using false $20 bills to the 1982 World's Fair in Knoxville, Tennessee. The teenagers told police that a man named "Jim" had given them the money after picking them up as hitchhikers. Following a three-month investigation, the home address of "Jim" was determined and on September 27, 1982, Chandler was arrested by US Secret Service agents as he was driving back home, also discovering $8,340 (equivalent to $27,824 in 2025) in fake currency in the trunk of his car. His true identity was discovered during his stay in jail, although Chandler maintained he was a "cypress clockmaker" to a magistrate. He was ultimately found guilty of possessing counterfeit money and sentenced to seven years, which he served at Federal Correctional Institution, Bastrop, a low-security federal prison in Bastrop, Texas, where he obtained a GED and accrued 33 hours in college credit. In June 1984, he was transferred to a federal prison in Florida to serve part of his pre-existing robbery conviction as a consecutive sentence. In Florida, Chandler requested that sentence be reduced to two years' imprisonment and five years' parole and on December 12, 1986, he was released after both of his sentences were deemed as served. There are no police records about Chandler's whereabouts for the next one-and-a-half years, except for a speeding ticket dated January 1, 1988, which placed him in Kentucky. On May 14, 1988, Chandler married Debra Ann Whiteman and in December 1988, the couple moved to Tampa Shores, where they bought a house for a mortgage of $109,800 (equivalent to $298,907 in 2025), paid by Whiteman. The couple had a daughter in February 1989, by which point Chandler had successfully restarted his aluminum-siding venture in Hillsborough County. He also resumed his work as an informant, this time for the Tampa Police Department.

== Rogers family murders ==
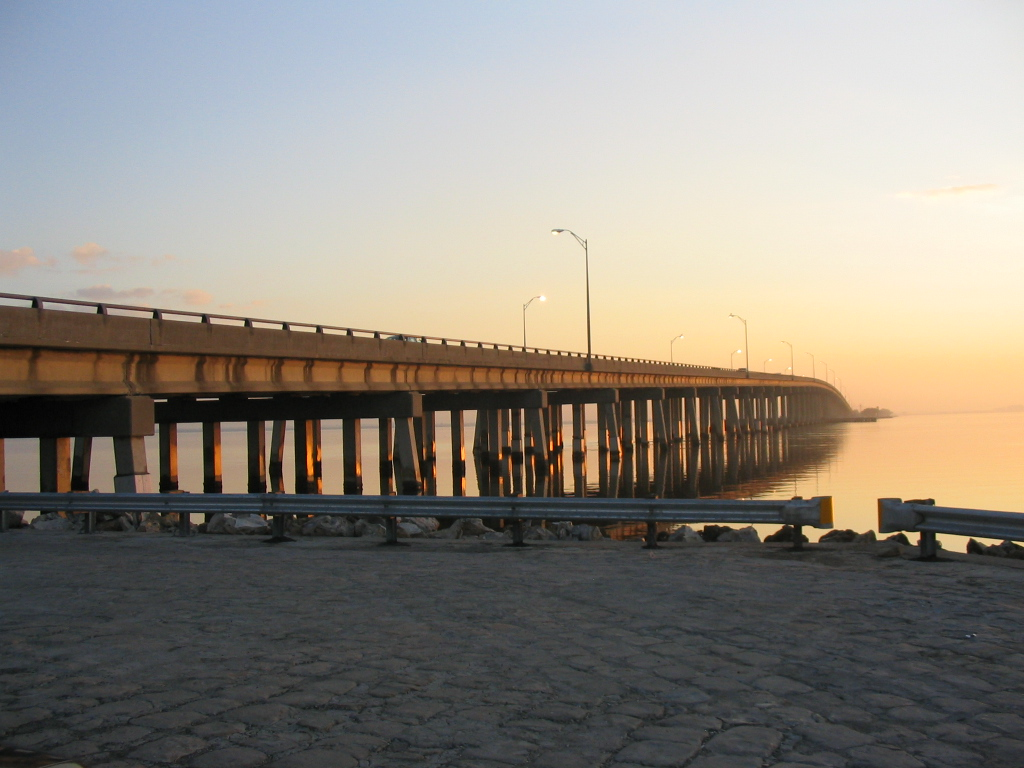
Courtney Campbell Causeway from the Clearwater side of the bridge where the bodies were found

On May 26, 1989, Joan "Jo" Rogers, 36, and her daughters‍—‌Michelle, 17, and Christe, 14‍—‌left their family dairy farm in Willshire, Ohio, for a vacation in Florida. It was the first time they had left their home state. Authorities believe Joan became lost on June 1 during the return drive from Orlando to Willshire, and had decided to take an extra vacation day in Tampa. While looking for their hotel they encountered Chandler, who gave them directions and offered to meet them again later to take them on a sunset cruise of Tampa Bay.

Joan and her teenage daughters had left Orlando around 9:00 a.m. and checked into the Days Inn on Route 60 at 12:30 p.m.

Photographs retrieved from a roll of film found in a camera in the Rogers' hotel room showed Michelle sitting on the floor. The last photograph was taken from the hotel balcony and showed the sun beginning to set over Tampa Bay, confirming that all three family members were alive and had not left their hotel room as the sunset began. They were last seen alive at the hotel's restaurant at around 7:30 p.m. It is believed they boarded Chandler's boat by the dock on the Courtney Campbell Causeway—part of Route 60—between 8:30 p.m. and 9:00 p.m., and that they were dead by 3 a.m. the next day. Chandler may have used the fact that he was born in Ohio to lure them into feeling a connection to him. Chandler knew Joan and her daughters were not from Florida because he saw the Ohio license plates on their car.

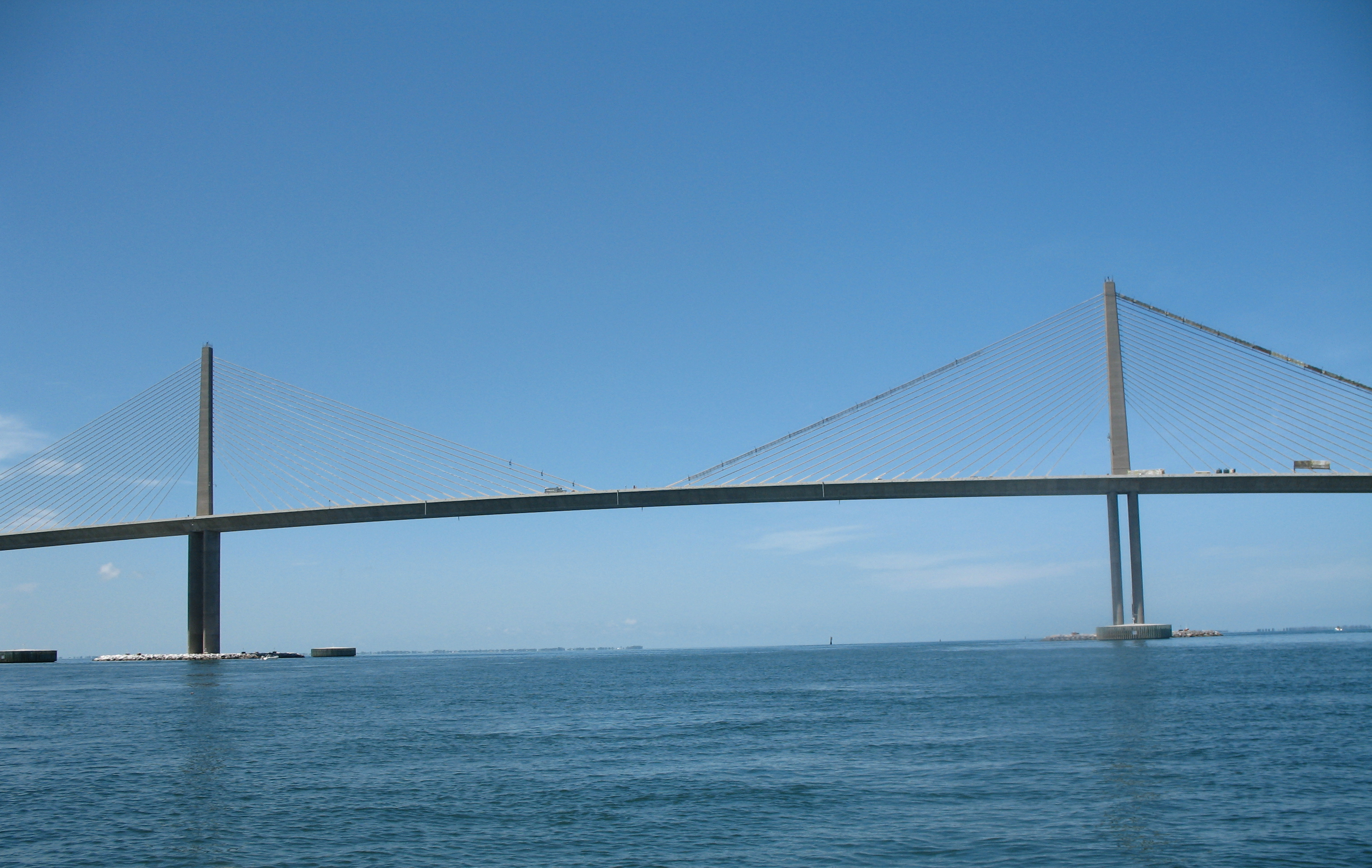
Sunshine Skyway over Tampa Bay where the first body was found on June 4, 1989

The victims' bodies were found floating in Tampa Bay on June 4, 1989. The first body was found when several people on board a sailboat crossing under the Sunshine Skyway saw an object in the water. The second body was seen floating off the pier in St. Petersburg, two miles (3 km) north of the first. While the Coast Guard were recovering the second body, a call about a third, which was seen floating 200 yards (200 m) to the east, was received. All three female bodies were found floating face down, bound with a rope around the neck, and naked below the waist.

Autopsies showed all three victims had water in their lungs, proving they had been thrown into the water while still alive. Michelle, who was identified as the second body found, had freed one hand from her bonds before she drowned. The partially dressed state of the three bodies indicated the underlying crime was sexual assault. Ropes with a concrete block at the other end had been tied around the victims' necks to ensure they died from either suffocation or drowning, and that their bodies would never be found. The bodies, however, bloated as a result of decomposition, and floated to the surface.

== Investigation ==
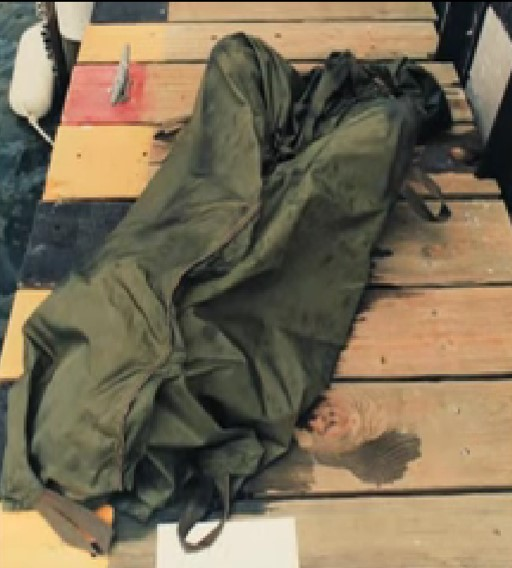
One of the body bags used at the scene on June 4, 1989

The Rogers' bodies underwent decomposition while underwater due to hot weather. Because of this, they were not identified for a week after their remains were located.

Joan Rogers and her daughters were not positively identified until a week after their bodies' discovery, by which time Joan's husband, the girls' father, Hal Rogers, had reported them missing in Ohio. On June 8, a housekeeper at the Days Inn said the Rogers family's room had not been disturbed and the beds had not been slept in. The hotel manager contacted the police. Fingerprints found in the room were matched to the bodies, and final confirmation of their identities came from dental records. Marine researchers at the University of South Florida estimated from currents and patterns that the victims were thrown from a boat‍—‌and not from a bridge or dry land‍—‌between two and five days before they were found. The Rogers' car, a 1986 Oldsmobile Calais with Ohio license plates, was found at the boat dock by the Courtney Campbell Causeway.

=== Facts and arrest ===
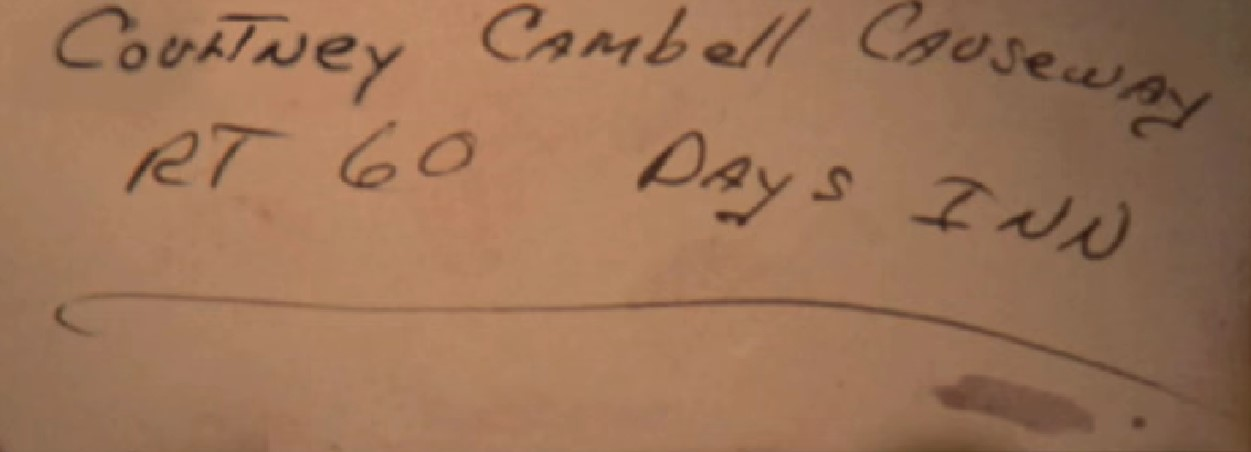
The writing on the note written on Joan Rogers' map, which was used to identify Chandler as the killer

In November 1989, St. Petersburg Police connected the Rogers family murders to the rape of a Canadian tourist, which took place near the murders and bore several similarities to the other crime. A police sketch was released, after which Chandler left Florida to visit his estranged daughter Kristal Mays in Cincinnati, telling her that he could not return because "police were looking for him for killing some women". In October 1990, during another visit, Chandler set up a drug deal, accompanied by his son-in-law Rick Mays. During the exchange, Chandler ran off with money from the drug dealers, forcing Mays to stay behind at gunpoint and telling him "Family don't mean shit to me". Mays was nearly beaten to death and his house was vandalized, after which Kristal dropped out of nursing school and encouraged her husband to press charges against her father.

At the same time, Chandler experienced significant financial troubles, first with the IRS for a $2,615 debt in unpaid back taxes from 1988, which was followed by a lien due to failed utility payments. Chandler obtained a state permit for his aluminum siding business in April 1990, but in July of the same year, Chandler and his wife stopped making house payments for their Tampa Shores residence, moving out the following month without notifiying their bank. Chandler lied to neighbors by claiming he was relocating to $340,000 home in Indian Rocks Beach. The bank initiated foreclosure proceedings on the Tampa property in December 1990 and upon its resale in 1992, it was found that the house had been emptied of furniture, and the pool left filled and uncleaned. In 1991, after briefly staying in Sunrise, the couple rented a $66,000 apartment in Port Orange, where Chandler went back to using his birth name. Chandler mostly presented himself as an unemployed hobby fisherman, but also claimed to own a pool screen enclosure company and was often hired by neighbors to build aluminum siding to their houses. He also frequently bought boats and cars from neighbors, only to resell them shortly after purchase.

Between May and September 1991‍—‌concurrent with the police investigation of the Rogers family triple murder‍—‌Chandler was an informant for the U.S. Customs Bureau's Tampa office. During this time, Chandler had convinced his nephew-in-law, 51-year-old John Martin, to smuggle marijuana grown by Chandler at his house. Martin eventually sought to sell some of the drugs to his boss, 40-year-old Steve Segura, who sought pain relief from glaucoma. Chandler arranged a meeting with a seller for 5 pounds (2.3 kg) of marijuana, really a police-run sting operation, in Chandler's vehicle at a WestShore Plaza parking lot. Martin and Segura were arrested, the former carrying a scale and the latter carrying two concealed handguns, as well as $6,000 (equivalent to $14,183 in 2025) carried by both in total. Martin was sentenced to one year of probation, an $85 fine and 20 hours of community service, while Segura received five years of probation, a $1,000 fine and 500 hours of community service.

In spring 1992, Jo Ann Steffey, a former neighbor of the Chandlers in Port Orange, recognized Chandler's handwriting from a work contract, as the signature on the document in the Rogers family murders had been widely distributed by police. On May 14, 1992, Steffey called St. Petersburg police about her findings, gave them a description of Chandler's appearance and had a friend, identified as either Dale Christie or Mozelle Smith, provide a copy of the contract via fax. The department did not compare the handwriting as they had received several tips regarding the murders. Steffey sent a second copy in July 1992, after which a detective interviewed her on July 31.

On September 11, 1992, Chandler robbed two jewelry manufacturers at gunpoint in their motel room in Pinellas Park. The men, who had come from California for a jewelry show, had both their merchandise and company car stolen. Chandler had driven to the location with his wife Debra and daughter, who stayed behind to read a book to their daughter. Chandler drove up to Debra in the stolen car, with both travelling to a different motel, where Chandler left the stolen vehicle, taking three cases back to their home. It was never established whether Debra was aware of the crime, though she admitted to the finding the circumstances suspicious and accepting a portion of the jewelry, which had been melted down to pure gold, while her husband left on a purported business trip, from which he did not return. The value of the stolen jewelry was initially estimated at $140,000 (equivalent to $321,200 in 2025), but later described as having a worth of $750,000 (equivalent to $1,720,714 in 2025).

Chandler, who had since been tied to the motel robbery, was arrested on September 24, 1992 and charged with murder, rape, armed robbery, and felony possession of a firearm. His handwritten directions on a brochure found in the Rogers' vehicle and a description of his boat written by Jo Rogers on the brochure were the primary clues that led to his being named a suspect. Local police posted images of Chandler's handwriting on the brochure on billboards in the Tampa Bay area, leading to a call from a former neighbor who provided a copy of a work order Chandler had written. This use of billboards by law enforcement in the US was unusual at the time.

Through handwriting analysis, the two samples were matched. A palm print on the brochure was also matched to Chandler, who had sold his boat and left town with his family soon after the billboards appeared. Police reported that Chandler and his then-wife moved from their home on Dalton Avenue in Tampa to Port Orange near Daytona Beach.

=== Second-suspect theory ===
Investigators originally thought two men were involved in the murders of the Rogers family. This theory was used for a reenactment shown in a 1991 episode of Unsolved Mysteries. This theory was dismissed when Chandler was arrested. No evidence of a second man‍—‌other than a former prison cellmate's claim that Chandler said another man, whose identity the cellmate claimed to know but would not reveal‍—‌has ever surfaced. The second-suspect theory was belied by Chandler's approach of two Canadian female tourists‍—‌that he was willing to approach multiple potential targets by himself.

Hal Rogers' brother John was also considered a suspect, even though he was serving a prison sentence for the rape of a woman at the time of the murders. Police investigating the woman's rape allegation found evidence indicating John had also sexually assaulted Hal's daughter Michelle, although charges involving this assault were later dropped because of her reluctance to testify. The St. Petersburg Times said John may have planned the murder during a visit to his parents' property near Tampa a month before the murders. Once the police established John could not have hired a contract killer, did not have accomplices, and could not have known the timing of his sister-in-law's and nieces' trip, he was dismissed as a suspect.

Hal was also considered a suspect because he had posted bail for his brother, but he stated in an episode of On the Case with Paula Zahn that he posted bail prior to knowing his brother had abused Michelle. Hal later said he had promised the family he would post bail and would not renege on his promise. Investigators from Florida and Ohio also discovered Hal had withdrawn US$7,000 from his bank account at the time of the disappearance, which he was able to account for. He had planned to use it to look for his wife and daughters before he was notified of their deaths. Investigations proved conclusively Hal had not left Ohio during that period. The assaults of Michelle Rogers by her uncle and gossip by local people was one of the reasons for the Florida trip; Joan and her daughters wanted to distance themselves from the incident.

== Trial ==
=== Chandler's testimony ===
At his trial in Clearwater, Florida, Chandler said he met Joan, Michelle, and Christe Rogers and gave them directions but he never saw them again except in newspaper coverage and on billboards. He acknowledged he was in Tampa Bay that night‍—‌the police had evidence of three ship-to-shore telephone calls made from his boat to his home during the time frame of the murders‍—‌but Chandler maintained he was fishing alone. He said he had returned home late because his engine would not start, which he attributed to a gas line leak. He also said he had called the Coast Guard and the Florida Marine Patrol, and had flagged down a patrol boat, but both were too busy to help. He said he subsequently fixed the line with duct tape and returned safely to shore.

There were, however, no records of distress calls from Chandler to either the Coast Guard or the Marine Patrol that night, nor were there any Coast Guard boats on the bay the following morning that could have helped him. According to a boat mechanic who testified for the prosecution, Chandler's explanation of repairing the boat's alleged gas leak was not tenable because the fuel lines in his boat ‍—‌a 1976 Bayliner‍—‌were directed upward. A leak would have sprayed fuel into the air rather than into the boat and the gasoline would have dissolved the adhesive of the duct tape Chandler maintained he had used to repair a leak. Under questioning from Pinellas County prosecutor Douglas Crow, Chandler then said he could not remember.

=== Witnesses ===
On May 15, 1989, two weeks before the Rogers murders, Chandler raped Judy Blair aboard his private boat. Blair, who was visiting the US as a tourist from Ontario with her friend Barbara Mottram, had met Chandler at a convenience store in Tampa the prior day. Using the name Dave Posner (or Posno), Chandler invited the women to a boat tour, which both had initially agreed to. The following morning, Mottram declined the offer on short notice, after which Chandler and Blair set off from Madeira Beach, spending most of the day sailing without incident. Upon returning to the docks, Chandler attempted to convince Blair to persuade Mottram into joining them for a second trip for dinner. When Blair stated that this would not be possible, Chandler "ticked off" and sailed the boat to the Gulf of Mexico, where Chandler raped Blair before returning her to shore. A day later, Blair told Mottram of the rape and reported the crime to police. During the 1992 trial, Blair identified Chandler from a collection of photos and a lineup. Chandler was not charged with this crime, initially because his identity was not known, and, after the murder trial, to prevent Blair from having to recount the ordeal again.

Blair and Mottram remembered that Chandler had stated that he was in the aluminum-siding contracting business, which later helped lead investigators to him. It also inspired the name of the investigation; "Operation Tin Man". The facial composite produced from Blair's description was posted on the billboards along with the handwriting samples.

A former employee of Chandler's testified that he bragged about dating three women on the bay on the night of the murders, and that the next morning he arrived by boat and delivered materials for a job and immediately set out again. In an attempt to establish Chandler's whereabouts on that night, investigators found records of several ship-to-shore telephone calls made from his boat to his home between 1:00 a.m. and 5:00 a.m., which may have been attempts to explain his absence to his wife and to provide himself with an alibi for the time of the murders. Chandler's daughter Kristal Sue Mays testified that her father had told her the police were looking for him because he "killed some women" and that he was afraid to return to Tampa; her husband Rick testified that he did not recall if Chandler had actually confessed to the murders, but did remember that Chandler admitted to raping women in the Madeira Beach area, and that he had said one of them "got away". Another of Chandler's daughters, Valerie Troxell, testified that he had admitted to raping a woman two weeks before the murders. A woman who worked as a maid at the Days Inn said she walked past Chandler on June 1 as she was going to the Rogers' room for room service. She said she did not realize the significance of this sighting until Chandler's arrest in 1992; this sighting has never been confirmed. Chandler's cellmate William Catzer told the court that, after viewing a news report about the Rogers murders, Chandler had said "If the bitch hadn't resisted I wouldn't be here". Michelle Rogers' boyfriend and Hal Rogers also gave evidence during trial.

=== Sentence and aftermath ===
Joan, Michelle, and Christe Rogers were buried in their hometown on June 13, 1989, following a funeral service attended by about 300 family members and friends. Numerous police officers were present to keep reporters and television crews out of the church during the service.

Chandler was found guilty of the murders and was sentenced to death on November 4, 1994. He maintained his innocence and continued to pursue legal appeals while on Florida's death row. He admitted to the Madeira Beach incident but said the sex was consensual and that the victim had changed her mind during the act. Because Chandler had already been sentenced to death for the Rogers murders and because prosecutors did not want to subject Blair to the emotional trauma of a rape trial, he was never prosecuted for her rape.

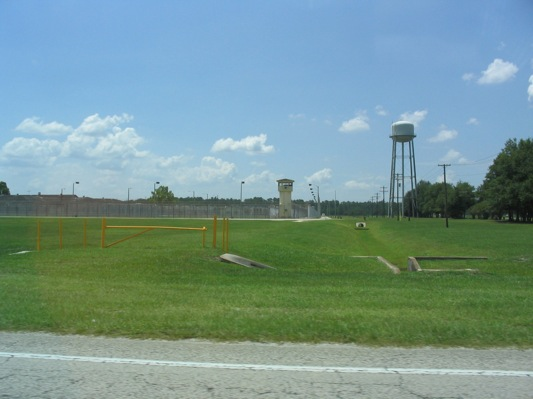
Union Correctional Institution where Chandler served his prison sentence

Chandler awaited execution of his sentence at the Union Correctional Institution. Shortly after the trial and conviction, his wife Debra filed for divorce and their marriage was dissolved a year later. Chandler was no longer allowed to see his daughter Whitney and in accordance with his ex-wife's wishes, he was not allowed to see later photographs of her. In July 2008, Chandler was on Florida's short list of executions.

Profiling experts speculated Chandler may have killed previously, based on the belief that a first-time killer would not be experienced or bold enough to abduct and kill three women at once. Chandler remained a suspect in the 1982 murder of a woman whose body was found floating off Anna Maria Island until 2011, when the body was identified as 29-year-old Amy Hurst and her husband William was arrested and charged with her murder, and was sentenced to life in prison on April 4, 2011. Chandler was never charged with another murder. All of his appeals of his 1994 conviction were denied; his last was in May 2007.

After his conviction, Chandler was named by media as one of Florida's most notorious criminals. He said his last words before his execution would be, "Kiss my rosy red ass". In May 2011, comparisons were drawn between Chandler's case and trial in 1994, and the murder case of Caylee Anthony. In both cases, heightened media attention forced the selection of jurors who lived outside the county where the crime had been committed. One of the jurors in Chandler's 1994 trial said, "He scared some of the jurors when he would sit there and stare at you and have that stupid grin on his face. He would make your skin crawl."

Judge Susan F. Schaeffer, who presided over the 1994 trial and ultimately sentenced Chandler described him in a 2011 interview as "a man with no soul." She said, "It's the worst case as far as factually, and as far as a defendant without saving grace, that I ever handled, and I represented plenty of people who were not necessarily good people."

== Execution ==
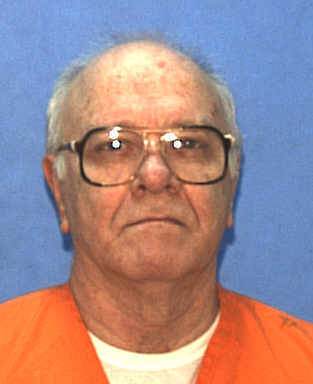
Prison mugshot of Chandler

On October 10, 2011, Governor Rick Scott signed Chandler's death warrant. His execution was set for November 15, 2011, at 4:00 p.m. His lawyer Baya Harrison said Chandler asked him not to file any frivolous appeals to keep him alive. Harrison said:

He is not putting a lot of pressure on me to go running around at the end to find some magic way out. He is not going to make a scene. He's not going to bemoan the legal system. What he has told me is this: if there is some legal way that I can find to try to prevent him from being executed, he would like me to do what I reasonably can.

Harrison also said Chandler suffered from high blood pressure, coronary artery disease, problems with his kidneys, and arthritis.

On October 12, 2011, Harrison said although he was preparing to file a motion regarding the violation of his client's Fifth and Fourteenth Amendment rights in the case, he was unsure whether Chandler was willing to travel to Clearwater for the court hearing or would agree to the filing of the motion. "He hates coming down to Clearwater. He doesn't like the ride and he's not well", Harrison said. On October 18, Harrison filed a motion against the execution on grounds that the way Florida imposes the death penalty is unconstitutional. A jury may recommend a life sentence or a death sentence, but under Florida law, the judge makes the final decision. A hearing on Chandler's motion was set for October 21 at 1:00 pm; Chandler did not attend. On October 24, Chandler's appeal was rejected because he had already filed an appeal to the Florida Supreme Court prior to the decision. Although the Florida Supreme Court initially scheduled Chandler's appeal to be heard on November 9, 2011, they later cancelled oral argument. On November 7, 2011, the Florida Supreme Court denied Chandler's appeal of his death sentences and death warrant. The Florida Supreme Court had upheld Chandler's death sentence in 1997 and 2003. Chandler's subsequent petition to the United States Supreme Court was also denied.

On November 15 at 4:08 pm Chandler was executed by lethal injection at Florida State Prison in Raiford. Chandler declined to make a last statement before being executed but left a written statement with prison officials: "You are killing a (sic) innocent man today." Shortly after signing Chandler's death warrant, Governor Scott said; "[Chandler] killed three women, so I looked through different cases, and it made sense to do that one. There's never one thing. It was the right case."

Chandler's daughter Valerie Troxell said in an interview after the execution; "I believe they did execute an innocent man. I don't think my father alone could have pulled off such a heinous crime. It would have to have been more than one person ... The palm print would prove he did meet them and gave them directions, but it didn't mean he killed them. I think the prosecution had a very weak case." Troxell also said she had sent a letter to Governor Scott asking him to commute Chandler's sentence to life imprisonment. Chandler's son Jeff said; "I truly believe he was tried and convicted by the media long before he went to trial. The media can pretty much convict you. I don't think he got a fair trial." After his execution, Chandler was described as the "loneliest man in the loneliest place on earth, death row." He did not receive a visitor during his years in Florida's death row unit. Another of Chandler's daughters, Suzette, said her father was a monster who got what he deserved.

== Later linked crimes ==
In July 1993, while Chandler's murder trial was still ongoing, it was revealed that Chandler was also considered a suspect to several additional sex crimes, which all took place between 1963 and 1991. They consisted of a 1963 rape in Pinellas Park, a 1964 statutory rape in Cincinnati, in which charges were dropped, a 1965 attempted rape, also in Cincinnati, a 1973 rape in Daytona Beach, a 1990 rape in Pasco County, Florida and the 1991 abduction and molestation of a 15-year-old girl in Daytona Beach. The Pinellas Park and Daytona Beach rapes were initially unreported and in the latter of these, the victim stated that she had a photo of the perpetrator, whom she identified as Chandler. Additionally, there had been another alleged incident related to Chandler and his boat at Hudson Beach in April 1989, when two men, one of whom introduced himself as "Mr. Wright", invited two women to a trip to the Gulf of Mexico on a boat that matched the description of Chandler's Bayliner. "Mr. Wright" sailed both women out to sea to "get better acquainted" but returned them to shore when they claimed that a friend was waiting for them.

=== Murder of Ivelisse Berrios-Beguerisse ===
On February 25, 2014, investigators revealed that DNA evidence identified Chandler as the murderer of 20-year-old Ivelisse Berrios-Beguerisse, who was raped and strangled in Coral Springs, Florida, on November 27, 1990.

Berrios-Beguerisse, a 20-year-old newlywed resident of Davie, Florida, was last seen at Sawgrass Mills Mall where she worked at a sporting goods store. When she did not return home, her husband went to the mall and found her car, a 1985 Ford Tempo, with the tires slashed. It is believed Chandler, after watching the victim for two days, slashed the tires, arrived in the guise of a helpful stranger, and offered to help. Three hours after she was reported missing, her body was found under a residential mailbox in a local neighborhood by two men returning from a fishing trip. Berrios-Beguerisse's body was naked and had ligature marks on both wrists and legs, and brown tape stuck to her hair.

Chandler, who lived in Sunrise at the time of the murder, had lived less than 1.5 miles (2.4 km) from Berrios-Beguerisse's workplace at the Sunrise Mall and moved from the apartment he had there two or three days after the murder. The case is considered solved and closed according to police. Law enforcement agencies across Florida investigated other cold cases in areas Chandler was known to have resided.

== Media coverage ==
The Discovery Channel devoted a one-hour episode of its series Scene of the Crime, titled "The Tin Man", to the murder of the Rogers family. In 1997, a series of articles titled "Angels & Demons," written by Thomas French—which told the story of the murders, the capture and conviction of Chandler, and the impact of the crimes on the Rogers' family and their community in Ohio—was published in the St. Petersburg Times. The series won a 1998 Pulitzer Prize for Feature Writing.

The Rogers murders were featured in a 1991 episode of Unsolved Mysteries, which speculated that there were two attackers. The 2000 book Bodies in the Bay by Mason Ramsey is a fictionalized adaptation of the Chandler case. Author Don Davis in 2007 published the book Death Cruise covering the murders.

The case was featured in a 1999 episode of Cold Case Files on A&E titled "Bodies in the Bay," which also focused on the evidence in the case.

In 1995, Chandler, some members of his family, and Hal Rogers appeared in an episode of the Maury Povich Show featuring the case. Chandler appeared via satellite link. Chandler's case was featured in a full-hour episode of Crime Stories. The case was shown on an episode of Forensic Files titled "Water Logged" in December 2010. In 2012 Investigation Discovery show On the Case with Paula Zahn aired two episodes called "Murder at Sunset" covering the case. In August 2014, the ID series Murder in Paradise covered the case.

On February 11, 2022, the Oxygen Channel aired an episode of Family Massacre called "The Rogers Family".

On November 19, 2022, the true crime podcast Casefile detailed the case of Jo, Michelle & Christe Rogers.

== See also ==
- Capital punishment in Florida
- Capital punishment in the United States
- List of people executed in Florida
- List of people executed in the United States in 2011

Executions carried out in Florida
| Preceded by Manuel Valle September 28, 2011 | Oba Chandler; November 15, 2011 | Succeeded by Robert Brian Waterhouse February 15, 2012 |
Executions carried out in the United States
| Preceded by Reginald Brooks – Ohio November 15, 2011 | Oba Chandler – Florida; November 15, 2011 | Succeeded by Guadalupe Esparza – Texas November 16, 2011 |
