= Marvin Lee Wilson =

American murderer (1958-2012)

- Born: January 5, 1958; Jefferson County, Texas, U.S.
- Died: August 7, 2012 (aged 54); Huntsville Unit, Texas, U.S.
- Height: 5 ft 9 in (175 cm)
- Status: Executed by lethal injection
- Convictions: Capital murder Aggravated robbery Robbery
- Penalty: Death (May 9, 1994)

Details
- Victims: Jerry Robert Williams
- Date: November 10, 1992

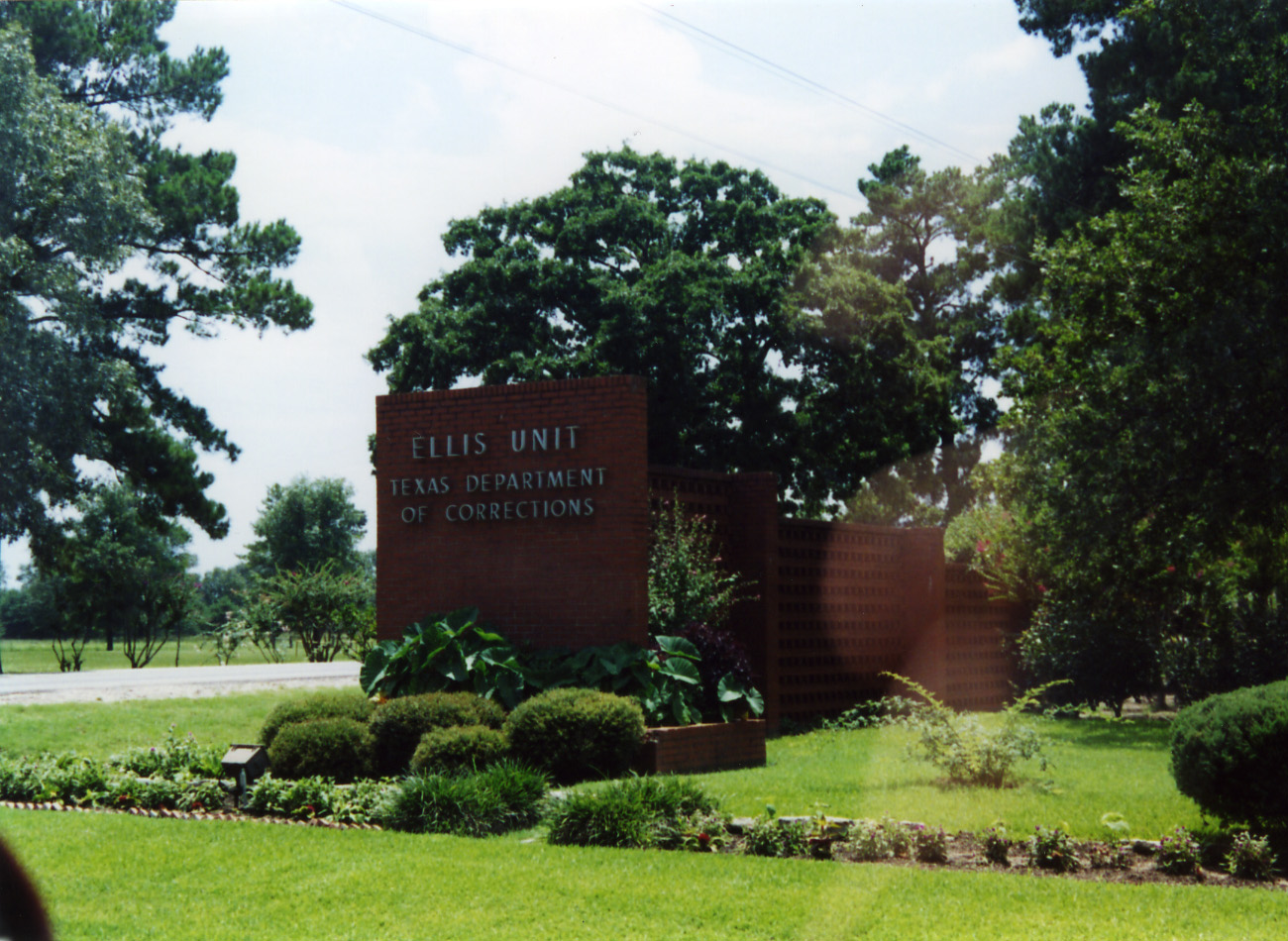
The Ellis Unit housed the State of Texas death row for men until 1999.

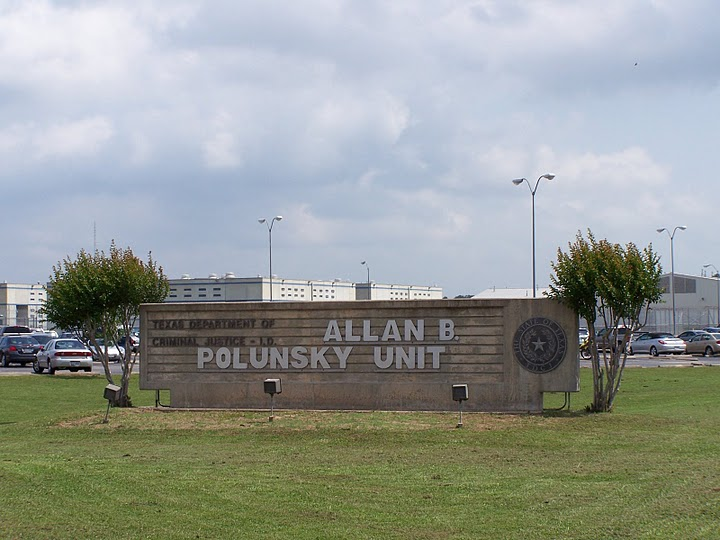
Allan B. Polunsky Unit houses the State of Texas death row for men.

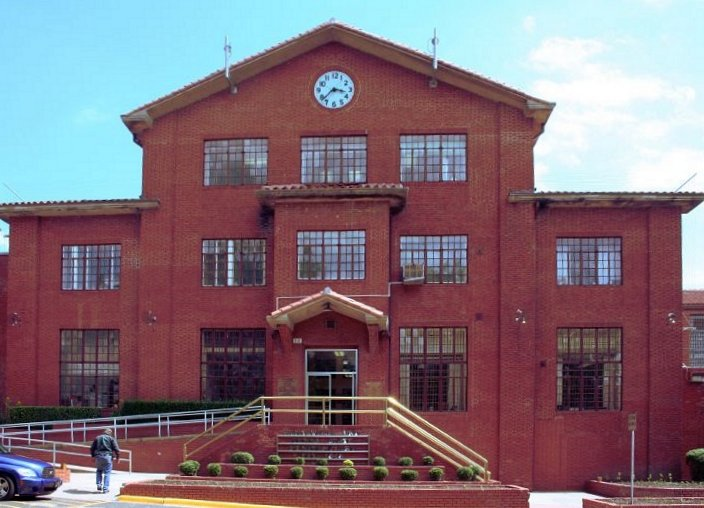
Huntsville Unit, the site of state executions

Marvin Lee Wilson (January 5, 1958 – August 7, 2012) was executed by the State of Texas on August 7, 2012, despite a 2004 test finding his IQ was 61. Supreme Court rulings subsequent to his execution in 2014 (Hall v. Florida) and 2017 (Moore v. Texas) ruled that the Eighth Amendment protected people with this low of an IQ from being executed under the discretion some states, including Texas, were using at the time. Wilson had previously scored 75, 75, and 79, all above the threshold to be considered intellectually disabled, on three other tests administered by state authorities. Wilson had also scored 73 at a test given when he was thirteen. The 2004 test which found Wilson to be intellectually disabled was further discredited when prosecutors found that it had been administered by a PhD candidate, rather than a consulting clinical psychologist.

Texas successfully used crime allegation specifics to argue against the expert IQ, but the states are no longer allowed to do that. He entered death row on May 9, 1994, for the murder of a police drug informant who had caught him dealing cocaine. On November 10, 1992, Wilson abducted and shot 21-year-old Jerry Robert Williams following a physical confrontation between the two in the 1500 block of Verone in Beaumont. Wilson then left the body of Williams at a bus stop where it was later found by a bus driver. At the time of the murder, Wilson had two previous convictions for robbery, one of them aggravated.

Wilson's IQ has been claimed to be measured at 61, which meant that he was legally intellectually disabled and thus ineligible for execution according to Atkins v. Virginia - a United States Supreme Court ruling against execution of retarded individuals. However, the United States Court of Appeals for the Fifth Circuit originally ruled in December 2005 that due to his lawyer missing a filing deadline, Wilson was unable to file further appeals in federal court.

On March 10, 2006, the Fifth Circuit court granted Wilson permission to file an appeal. In its opinion, the court wrote, "We are satisfied that these are the sort of rare and extraordinary circumstances that justify" waiving the filing deadline.

The National Coalition to Abolish the Death Penalty states that "Wilson’s case illustrates one of the many ways the AEDPA Antiterrorism and Effective Death Penalty Act has severely limited the ability of death row inmates to have their convictions and sentences reviewed to determine if they are being held contrary to the laws of the Constitution."

He was imprisoned as Texas Department of Criminal Justice (TDCJ) inmate #00999098. Wilson was initially located in the Ellis Unit, but was transferred to the Allan B. Polunsky Unit (formerly the Terrell Unit) near Livingston, Texas in 1999. He was executed at Huntsville Unit, Huntsville, Texas.

== See also ==
- List of people executed in Texas, 2010–2019
- List of people executed in the United States in 2012

Executions carried out in Texas
| Preceded by Yokamon Laneal Hearn July 18, 2012 | Marvin Lee Wilson; August 7, 2012 | Succeeded by Robert Wayne Harris September 20, 2012 |
Executions carried out in the United States
| Preceded by Yokamon Laenal Hearn – Texas July 18, 2012 | Marvin Lee Wilson – Texas; August 7, 2012 | Succeeded by Daniel Wayne Cook – Arizona August 8, 2012 |
