= Robert Wayne Harris =

Executed American mass murderer and serial killer (1972–2012)

- Born: February 28, 1972; Dallas County, Texas, U.S.
- Died: September 20, 2012 (aged 40); Huntsville Unit, Texas, U.S.
- Status: Executed by lethal injection
- Motive: Revenge; Robbery
- Convictions: Capital murder; Burglary (3 counts); Evading arrest
- Penalty: Death

Details
- Victims: 6 killed 1 wounded
- Span of crimes: November 29, 1999 – March 20, 2000
- Country: United States
- State: Texas
- Weapons: 9mm pistol Knife
- Date apprehended: March 21, 2000

Robert Wayne Harris (February 28, 1972 – September 20, 2012) was an American mass murderer and serial killer who killed six people in Texas. In 1999, Harris abducted and killed a woman whom he suspected of stealing money from him. The following year, he went on a shooting rampage at his former workplace, a car wash, killing five people. Harris had been fired a few days earlier, after he exposed himself to a customer. He was convicted of capital murder for the car wash shooting, sentenced to death, and executed in 2012.

== Early life ==
When Harris was 8 years old, he watched his father kill his mother and then commit suicide. He was then "bounced around among relatives," developed a stutter, and placed in special education classes. Harris was bullied in school and dropped out in 9th grade. Harris was known to physically confront teachers and students and was diagnosed with aggressive conduct disorder. However, he earned his GED when he was 18.

== Early crimes ==
When Harris was 15, he assaulted a mall clerk and burglarized his aunt's home. After she reported the burglary, Harris struck his aunt on the head with a hammer so hard that it broke. He spent two years in a juvenile correctional facility for this incident. Harris started dealing drugs when he was 17 years old.

In 1991, Harris committed three burglaries. He initially received probation, but received an 8-year sentence after fleeing a treatment program. Harris was paroled in 1999. While in prison, he spent most of his time in administrative segregation due to behavioral problems. Harris attended a program for mentally ill offenders, but the incidents continued, and he was eventually discharged for non-compliance. The incidents included setting fire to his cell, threatening to kill prison staff, assaulting prison staff and other inmates, drug dealing, not following orders, and sexual misconduct.

== Murders ==
On November 29, 1999, Harris abducted and fatally shot 37-year-old Sandra Scott. He later said he killed her after suspecting her of stealing money from him. Harris was initially questioned about Scott's disappearance, but was not charged. When police found her truck, all of the property inside was missing, except for the keys.

On March 15, 2000, Harris masturbated in front of a female customer at his workplace in Irving, Texas, Mi-T-Fine Car Wash. The woman reported the incident and the police were called. Harris was arrested, then fired two days later. He had worked there for about 10 months at the time of being fired. On March 19, Harris borrowed a car from a friend. He then went to another friend, Billy Brooks, who got his stepson to lend Harris a pistol.

On March 20, Harris drove to the car wash before opening hours. He forced manager Dennis Lee, 48, assistant manager Augustin Villasenor, 36, and cashier Rhoda Wheeler, 46, into the office. Harris had Wheeler open the safe, then forced her and the two others onto the floor and shot them. He also slit Lee's throat. When three other employees arrived, Harris forced them onto the floor in the lobby and shot them. Benjamin Villasenor, 32, and Roberto Jimenez, 15, were killed. The other victim survived but was left with permanent disabilities. All of the victims were shot once in the back of the head.

Another employee, Jason Shields, arrived and saw the victims in the lobby. He then saw Harris, who claimed he had stumbled across the crime scene. When Harris pulled out a knife from a nearby bookshelf, Shields ran to a nearby donut shop and called the police. Harris followed him to the donut shop and briefly spoke to the 911 operator before fleeing the scene. He stole about $4,000 during the robbery.

Harris returned the borrowed vehicle to his friend and told him he had discovered the bodies at the car wash. He then went to Brooks's house, where he disposed of several pieces of evidence. Harris then bought new clothing and checked into a motel. He was arrested the following day at the home of another friend. Harris later said he was planning to drive to Florida to kill his ex-girlfriend. He also confessed to killing Scott and led police to her body.

== Trial and execution ==
Harris was charged with capital murder for the car wash shootings, and prosecutors announced they would seek his execution. In September 2000, he was found guilty of capital murder after the jury deliberated for 11 minutes. During his sentencing hearing, Harris' lawyers asked for a life sentence, pointing to his psychological issues and his dysfunctional early years. Psychologists diagnosed him with depression, antisocial personality disorder, and Tourette syndrome. Prosecutors said Harris knew right from wrong and had good role models for most of his life.

On September 29, 2000, the jury recommended a death sentence for Harris after about two hours of deliberations. Two of victim Rhoda Wheelers children, Charity McFadden and Jeremy Spears, were in the courtroom during the sentencing. They expressed a positive view of the sentence.

While he was on death row, Harris's lawyers claimed he was mentally disabled and thus ineligible for execution. However, experts for both the state and the defense agreed Harris was not mentally disabled.

Harris was executed by lethal injection at the Huntsville Unit on September 20, 2012. He was injected with a fatal dose of Pentobarbital and was pronounced dead at 6:43 p.m. His last words were "I want to tell y'all, know that I love you. Billy, I love you, English, Hart and Eloise. Dwight, take care of Dwight. I'm going home, I'm going home. I'll be alright, don't worry. I love y'all. God bless and the Texas Rangers, Texas Rangers."

He is buried at Captain Joe Byrd Cemetery.

== See also ==
- Capital punishment in Texas
- List of people executed in Texas, 2010–2019
- List of people executed in the United States in 2012
- List of serial killers in the United States

Executions carried out in Texas
Preceded by Marvin Lee Wilson August 7, 2012	Robert Wayne Harris; September 20, 2012	Succeeded by Cleve Foster September 25, 2012
Executions carried out in the United States
Preceded by Donald L. Palmer – Ohio September 20, 2012	Robert Wayne Harris – Texas; September 20, 2012	Succeeded by Cleve Foster – Texas September 25, 2012
