= Color Wheel (Kernis) =

Orchestral work by Aaron Jay Kernis

Color Wheel is an orchestral composition written in 2001 by the American composer Aaron Jay Kernis. The work was commissioned by the Philadelphia Orchestra for the opening concert at Verizon Hall in the newly constructed Kimmel Center for the Performing Arts in Philadelphia and in celebration of the orchestra's centennial. Its world premiere was performed by the Philadelphia Orchestra conducted by Wolfgang Sawallisch at Verizon Hall on December 15, 2001. Color Wheel is dedicated to the composer's wife Evelyne Luest.

== Composition ==
=== Background ===
Kernis conceived of Color Wheel as a "'miniature' concerto for orchestra," which treats the orchestra "as a large and dynamic body of sound and color." The resulting work is cast in one continuous movement and lasts about 22 minutes. The title of the piece comes from the eponymous visual tool used for organizing color hues around a circle; in the score program note, Kernis wrote, "I feel that this piece concentrates on the bolder contrasts of basic primary colors. (I sometimes see colors when I compose, and the qualities of certain chords do elicit specific sensation in me — for example, I see A major as bright yellow)."

=== Instrumentation ===
The work is scored for an orchestra comprising three flutes (3rd doubling piccolo), three oboes (3rd doubling cor anglais), three clarinets (2nd doubling E♭ clarinet; 3rd doubling bass clarinet), three bassoons (3rd doubling contrabassoon), four horns, four trumpets (1st doubling piccolo trumpet), two trombones, bass trombone, tuba, timpani, four or five percussionists, electric bass (can be substituted by a second keyboardist playing a synthesizer with electric bass sound), piano (doubling celesta), harp, and strings.

== Reception ==
Color Wheel has been praised by music critics. Reviewing the world premiere, Tim Page of The Washington Post described the piece as "an engaging riot of orchestral color that lacks the pomposity of so many ceremonial compositions." Geoff Brown of BBC Music Magazine later praised the piece for its "celebratory panache," saying that "it spins not only through the colour spectrum but the stylistic spectrum as well: granite dissonances, pensive calm, nervous jazz, Hollywood shock and awe – so many characteristic American sounds find a home with this prize-winning composer, jostling inside a variation chain in fussily luscious orchestrations. Weak ending excepted, it's an exhilarating ride, blessed with a clear recording that vividly captures the music’s whirlwind textures." Laurence Vittes of Gramophone similarly wrote, "An awesome timpani roll [...] introduces passages of frozen time like Nevsky's ice lake leading to Oz-like poppy-field fantasies, delirious woodwinds and brass attitudes, and suddenly you realise you're in the middle of what the composer calls a 'miniature' concerto for orchestra, just the kind of exhilarating showpiece that had been ordered.

Conversely, David Patrick Stearns of The Philadelphia Inquirer described Color Wheel as "good music [...] buried under way too many notes, suggesting how the weight of being a Pulitzer Prize-winning composer can be inhibiting and inspiring."

== Recording ==
A recording of Color Wheel, performed by the Nashville Symphony conducted by Giancarlo Guerrero, was released on album together with Kernis's Symphony No. 4 Chromelodeon through Naxos in June 2020.
