= Ramon Torres Hernandez =

Executed American serial killer

- TDCJ mugshot
- Born: November 8, 1971; Bexar County, Texas, U.S.
- Died: November 14, 2012 (aged 41); Huntsville Unit, Texas, U.S.
- Status: Executed by lethal injection
- Convictions: Capital murder Burglary (3 counts)
- Penalty: Death

Details
- Victims: 3–5+
- Span of crimes: 1994–2001
- Country: United States
- State: Texas
- Date apprehended: April 4, 2001

Ramon Torres Hernandez (November 8, 1971 – November 14, 2012) was an American serial killer, kidnapper and rapist responsible for at least three murders in Bexar County, Texas from 1994 to 2001, and is a prime suspect in two others. Following his arrest, he admitted to the killings, was sentenced to death and ultimately executed in 2012.

== Murders ==
Before the murders, Hernandez was in prison for burglary. During the course of the burglary, he raped a woman. Hernandez received an 18-year sentence and was paroled on June 11, 1993.

- December 16, 1994; 13-year-old Sarah Beth Gonzales and her cousin 12-year-old Priscilla Almares were reported missing by their families after they left a friend's house to not be seen again. The next day, their bodies were found at Rodriguez Park. An autopsy confirmed both had been sexually assaulted before being killed. In the following investigation, police struggled to locate a suspect.
- March 31, 2001; Hernandez, his girlfriend Asel Abdygapparova, and his friend Santos Minjares, were prowling through San Antonio's westside looking for a victim to rob. They spotted 37-year-old Rosa Maria Rosado sitting alone at a bus stop, whom they forced into their car, and forced duct tape onto her mouth. Both Hernandez and Santos raped and eventually killed her, later making a shallow grave where they disposed of the body.

== Apprehension ==
In the following days after the murder, Abdygapparova contacted the police and wanted to give them the location of Rosado's body. In the investigation, police tied Hernandez to the crime, based on part of a shovel that he sent Abdygapparova to buy. He was arrested on April 4, for the murder, and Santos was arrested the following day. While he awaited his trial, a sample of Hernandez's DNA was seized by detectives, who matched it to the biological evidence collected at the Gonzales and Almares homicide scene. In addition, they linked Hernandez to an earlier double murder of two teens that occurred a month before Gonzales and Almares' killings, but not enough evidence could be located.

While Hernandez was initially never charged with killing Gonzales and Almares, investigators announced that the case was nevertheless solved. On October 21, 2002, Hernandez, who had made a full confession to the murders, was sentenced to death, and in a separate trial, Santos was also found guilty and sentenced to death. Asel was sentenced to life imprisonment for her role in Rosado's murder. Before his execution date could be set, Santos died on death row in January 2012, from natural causes.

Hernandez was aided by his girlfriend, Asel Abdygapparova, in the murder of Rosado. She'd helped abduct Rosado and bought the shovel used to bury her. Abdygapparova was convicted of capital murder. Prosecutors sought a death sentence, but the jury spared her life and she was instead sentenced to life in prison with the possibility of parole after 40 years. On appeal, Abdygapparova's conviction was overturned. In 2014, she pleaded no contest to murder, with her sentence capped at 28 years. She has since been paroled and deported to her native Kazakhstan. Abdygapparova had claimed she was scared when she participated in the murder.

== Execution ==
On November 14, 2012, Hernandez was executed at the Huntsville Unit by lethal injection. His last words were addressed to his brother. He was the 14th inmate executed in Texas that year.

== See also ==
- Capital punishment in Texas
- Capital punishment in the United States
- List of people executed by lethal injection
- List of people executed in Texas, 2010–2019
- List of people executed in the United States in 2012
- List of serial killers in the United States

Executions carried out in Texas
Preceded by Mario Rashad Swain November 8, 2012	Ramon Torres Hernandez; November 14, 2012	Succeeded by Preston Craig Hughes III November 15, 2012
Executions carried out in the United States
Preceded by Brett Xavier Hartman – Ohio November 13, 2012	Ramon Torres Hernandez – Texas; November 14, 2012	Succeeded by Preston Craig Hughes III – Texas November 15, 2012
