= Robert Brian Waterhouse =

American convicted murderer (1946–2012)

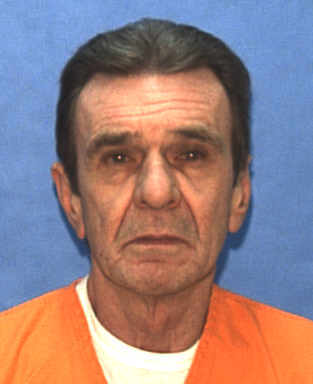
- Born: December 16, 1946; Greenpoint, Brooklyn, New York, U.S.
- Died: February 15, 2012 (aged 65); Florida State Prison, Florida, U.S.
- Status: Executed by lethal injection
- Convictions: New York: Second-degree murder; Florida: First degree murder
- Penalty: New York: 20 years to life imprisonment; Florida: Death

Details
- Victims: 2
- Date: February 1966 – January 1980
- Country: United States
- States: New York, Florida
- Locations: Greenport, Suffolk County, New York (1966); St. Petersburg, Florida (1980)
- Imprisoned at: Union Correctional Institution

Robert Brian Waterhouse (December 16, 1946 – February 15, 2012) was an American convicted murderer who killed two women in 1966 and 1980 respectively. Waterhouse first raped and killed 77-year-old Ella Carter in New York in February 1966, and he was first convicted and sentenced to life imprisonment for second-degree murder. Waterhouse was paroled after he served eight years of his sentence, but in January 1980, he committed murder a second time, raping and murdering 29-year-old Deborah Kammerer in Florida. For this second murder, Waterhouse was found guilty of first-degree murder, and he was sentenced to death and executed on February 15, 2012.

== Early life ==
Robert Brian Waterhouse was born on December 16, 1946, in Greenpoint, New York, as the fourth of five children of Mabel Quarty Waterhouse and Roger Waterhouse. At approximately six months of age, he began living with his maternal aunt and uncle, Lois and Chester Foster, and remained in their care throughout his childhood. As a child, Waterhouse reportedly experienced bullying from peers. He was teased for being raised by relatives, mocked because of rumors surrounding his placement with the Fosters, and ridiculed over his surname. His aunt recalled that classmates' taunts often upset him enough that he stopped riding the school bus. School records from this period describe him as emotionally sensitive, noting that he could become upset when things did not go his way.

When he entered adolescence, Waterhouse underwent rapid physical growth, becoming considerably larger and stronger than many of his peers. His behavior became increasingly aggressive, with frequent involvement in fights and disciplinary incidents at school. Teachers' records noted that other students feared him, while classmates later described him as intimidating and eager to project a rebellious image. Despite these behavioral problems, he was generally considered an average student who worked hard and participated in baseball, where coaches remembered him as talented but prone to losing control during competition. However, during his mid-teenage years, Waterhouse began drinking alcohol regularly, gaining access to local bars because he appeared older than his age, and he also consumed marijuana. Waterhouse's disciplinary issues deteriorated in high school, and he was thus expelled in 1964 for smashing a teacher's windshield with a tire iron, which was directly linked to an argument during a school dance. Waterhouse eventually completed his high school diploma a year later in 1965 after homeschooling.

After he completed his high school education, Waterhouse worked as an identification checker at a local bowling alley and later obtained employment at the Suffolk County Center in Riverhead. In August 1965, he survived a serious automobile accident that killed one of his friends, although he sustained a concussion as a result. Following the accident, Waterhouse began dating a woman, with whom he fathered a son, who was born on August 23, 1966, although Waterhouse in later years would doubt the true paternity of the child. The couple's relationship progressed quickly and they were discussing the possibility of marriage by the end of 1965. However, by February 1966, Waterhouse and his then girlfriend broke up after a fierce argument between them.

== Murder of Ella Carter ==
On February 11, 1966, Robert Waterhouse committed his first murder at the age of 19. At about 1am, Waterhouse broke into the home of 77-year-old Ella Mae Carter, a widow who lived in Greenport, New York. According to news and official sources of the murder, Waterhouse attacked Carter, who fled to the kitchen, where she was caught and dragged back to the bedroom, but not without attempting to resist her assailant. After taking Carter to the bedroom, Waterhouse brutally battered the elderly woman (including blows to the head) and raped her, before he strangled her to death.

Later that evening, at 6:38pm, Carter's nude body was found lying on a bed by her nephew. Suffolk County Chief Deputy Medical Examiner Dr. Hugh Ashmore conducted an autopsy on the victim, and certified that the cause of death was strangulation. Apart from this, 14 of Carter's ribs were found to be fractured from the assault, and teeth marks were found under her right breast, which corroborated the fact that she was raped before her death. Soon after, police investigations identified Waterhouse as the prime suspect, given that he previously did yard work for the victim and was also charged for being a peeping tom in a past unrelated case. After his arrest, Waterhouse was charged with first-degree murder on February 13, 1966, and detained without bail while awaiting trial.

On March 13, 1966, Waterhouse pleaded guilty to a reduced charge of second-degree murder, and he was sentenced to 20 years to life imprisonment. He was incarcerated at the Auburn Correctional Facility, and served nine years and seven months out of his sentence before he was paroled and released on October 29, 1975, partly due to good behaviour and a legal revision of New York state's penal code.

== Life after first release ==
After his release, Waterhouse returned to his hometown of Greenport, and he worked as a shipyard worker at a local shipbuilding company until September 1976, and he remained unemployed for a period of time before he worked as a bayman, primarily harvesting scallops, and he left Greenport in October 1976. Between 1977 and 1980, Waterhouse settled in both Louisiana and Florida, taking up various short-term jobs like shipping and receiving foreman, house painter, and life insurance salesman, and he also did not declare to his past employers about his murder conviction before he took these jobs.

Waterhouse re-settled in St. Petersburg, Florida in September 1978, and he went on to work as a shipyard worker before he became a construction worker. However, he was arrested for attempted vehicular homicide on April 26, 1979, when he allegedly drove his vehicle into two pedestrians, Lorenzo Sims and Evelyn Prince, in St. Petersburg, and the prosecution alleged that Waterhouse intentionally did the act. A jury ultimately found him not guilty of the charge after they accepted his claims that it was an accident, and Waterhouse was released after he spent three months in jail. An arrest warrant was issued against him by the state of New York for parole violation in June 1979. After his acquittal, Waterhouse returned to construction work and maintained a low profile life before he committed his second murder in 1980.

== Murder of Deborah Kammerer ==
On January 3, 1980, in St. Petersburg, Florida, 29-year-old Deborah Kammerer was the second victim murdered by Robert Waterhouse, 14 years after he killed Ella Carter in New York. On the night of January 2, 1980, the eve of her murder, Kammerer was last seen alive by two acquaintances at a bar, where she invited them for drinks, before they left due to a patron trying to start a fight, and Kammerer did not follow them out of the lounge. Afterwards, Kammerer was approached by Waterhouse, who conversed with her before the two of them left the premises together, with a bartender witnessing their departure, which took place at 1am on January 3, 1980.

According to sources, after leaving the lounge with Kammerer, at some point, Waterhouse attacked Kammerer and raped her, and he also brutally battered her before he killed her. Later that morning, Kammerer's naked body was found lying face down by a man walking his dog near the shore of Tampa Bay. An autopsy revealed that Kammerer died as a result of drowning, and she also had multiple severe lacerations on her head and extensive bruises on her throat; she had 30 lacerations and 36 bruises in total, and it was believed that he was beaten with a steel tire changing tool. A bloody tampon was also found jammed down her throat, and she was also sexually mutilated with a bottle. Lacerations and acid phosphatase were also found on the rectum, which corroborated the fact that Kammerer was raped before her death.

On January 9, 1980, a week after the murder of Deborah Kammerer, Waterhouse was arrested as a suspect for the killing. He was charged with first-degree murder for the killing of Kammerer, and was later charged with attempted rape for trying to sexually assault a male prisoner at the Pinellas County Jail, where he was detained while pending trial for Kammerer's murder.

== Death penalty trial ==
On August 25, 1980, Robert Waterhouse officially stood trial for the murder of Kammerer. The prosecution intended to seek the death penalty for Waterhouse and presented their opening statements on that day, and were set to summon 30 witnesses to testify in court. Assistant Pinellas County Medical Examiner Joan Wood was expected to be the first witness to take the stand and testify about the cause of death and injuries sustained by the victim before her death.

During the trial, the prosecution submitted forensic evidence that connected Waterhouse to the murder of Kammerer. The testing done on the blood splatters discovered on the interior of Waterhouse's car roof were found to be blood type A and it matched to the blood of Kammerer, and it appeared to have been left due to "forceful bloodshed". There were several witnesses who testified that they had seen Waterhouse cleaning his car a day after the murder and he also applied for leave from work that day, and the foreman testified that he saw scratches on Waterhouse, who seemed to be in a state of hungover, and he heard Waterhouse stating he liked slapping women whenever he had sex with them. Kyoe Madokawa Ginn, a bartender working at a local lounge, testified that she saw Waterhouse and Kammerer, who were both regular patrons of the lounge, leave the premises just after midnight on January 3, 1980, before she was murdered. Based on the totality of evidence, the prosecution urged the jury to convict Waterhouse of Kammerer's murder during the closing submissions phase of the trial.

On September 2, 1980, Waterhouse was found guilty of first-degree murder for killing Kammerer. A sentencing trial was carried out before the same jury, who were tasked to decide between a death sentence or life imprisonment for Waterhouse, and during the proceedings, a retired New York police detective named Lawrence Hawes testified about the 1966 murder of Ella Carter and the brutality behind the crime, and the prosecution intended to use this testimony and Waterhouse's previous murder conviction to support their reasons to seek the death penalty for Waterhouse.

On September 3, 1980, a day after his conviction, Waterhouse was sentenced to death via the electric chair by Circuit Judge Robert Beach upon the jury's unanimous recommendation for capital punishment.

== Appeal process ==
On February 17, 1983, the Florida Supreme Court dismissed Robert Waterhouse's appeal against his death sentence.

On November 7, 1983, Waterhouse's appeal was turned down by the U.S. Supreme Court.

As of September 1984, Waterhouse was one of 18 Pinellas County prisoners awaiting execution on Florida's death row.

On February 22, 1985, then Governor Bob Graham signed death warrants for both Waterhouse and James Agan, whose executions were scheduled to be carried out on March 19, 1985. However, the pair received stay of executions from the state courts nearing their respective scheduled execution dates.

On February 11, 1988, the Florida Supreme Court upheld Waterhouse's murder conviction but they vacated the death sentence, granting him a re-sentencing trial for him on the basis that the jury did not get to hear mitigating factors such as his alcoholism and childhood abuse before they voted on the death sentence for Waterhouse.

On March 21, 1990, a second jury unanimously recommended the death penalty for Waterhouse. A month later, on April 11, 1990, Circuit Judge Robert Beach formally re-sentenced Waterhouse to death by electrocution for the murder of Kammerer; he was the same trial judge who condemned Waterhouse to death row for the murder back in 1980 during his original murder trial.

On February 20, 1992, the Florida Supreme Court denied Waterhouse's direct appeal against his second death sentence.

On November 2, 1992, the U.S. Supreme Court rejected the appeals of both Waterhouse and another death row inmate, Dieter Riechmann.

On November 21, 2002, Waterhouse's appeal was dismissed by the Florida Supreme Court.

== Execution ==
On January 4, 2012, 32 years after he murdered Deborah Kammerer, Robert Waterhouse's death warrant was signed by Governor Rick Scott, who ordered his execution to be conducted on February 15, 2012.

After receiving his execution warrant, Waterhouse filed final appeals against his death sentence, and on February 9, 2012, the Florida Supreme Court rejected the last-minute appeal of Waterhouse. The U.S. Supreme Court denied Waterhouse's final appeal on the same day he was due to be executed; the scheduled timing of the execution was 6pm, but the execution was pushed back by several hours as a result of the appeal.

On February 15, 2012, 65-year-old Robert Brian Waterhouse was put to death by lethal injection at the Florida State Prison. In his final statement before his execution at about 8pm, Waterhouse claimed that the state was wrongfully executing an innocent man and claimed that his conviction was secured with the help of a "jailhouse snitch, corrupt prosecutors, prejudiced judges and falsified police reports", and before ending off, he addressed his family, "To my wife and family, I love you. And that's it." For his last meal, Waterhouse ordered two pork chops, two eggs cooked sunnyside up, two slices of toast, one slice of cherry pie, one pint of butter pecan ice cream, one pint of orange juice and a pint of milk.

== See also ==
- Capital punishment in Florida
- List of people executed in Florida
- List of people executed in the United States in 2012

Executions carried out in Florida
Preceded by Oba Chandler Jr. November 15, 2011	Robert Brian Waterhouse; February 15, 2012	Succeeded by David Alan Gore April 12, 2012
Executions carried out in the United States
Preceded by Edwin Hart Turner – Mississippi February 8, 2012	Robert Brian Waterhouse – Florida; February 15, 2012	Succeeded by Robert Henry Moormann – Arizona February 29, 2012
