= MBI =

MBI may refer to:

== Travel and police ==
- Machaneh Bonim in Israel, a tour of Israel by Habonim Dror
- Mbeya Airport (IATA code), Tanzania
- Mississippi Bureau of Investigation, an investigation agency in the state of Mississippi under the Mississippi Highway Patrol
- Metropolitan Bureau of Investigation, Florida, US

== Arts and media ==
- Minnesota Brass, Inc., a performing arts organization
- MBI Publishing Company, publishers in Saint Paul, Minnesota, part of The Quarto Group
- Minaj Broadcast International, a defunct Nigerian television channel
- mbi.is, the website for the Icelandic daily newspaper Morgunblaðið

== Medicine, business, and education ==
- Molecular Breast Imaging
- MBI (Michigan Biotechnology Institute), a non-profit research accelerator
- Mild behavioral impairment
- Maslach Burnout Inventory, a scale for burnout syndrome
- Management buy-in, of a large interest in a company
- Master of Business Informatics
- Mathematical Biosciences Institute
- Moody Bible Institute

== See also ==
- MB1, athletic shoe by Big Baller Brand
