= List of people executed in the United States in 2012 =

Forty-three people, all male, were executed in the United States in 2012, all by lethal injection. Fifteen of them were in the state of Texas. Delaware conducted its final execution in 2012 before the state abolished the death penalty in 2016.

== List of people executed in the United States in 2012 ==
| No. | Date of execution | Name | Age of person | | | Gender | Ethnicity | State | Method | Ref. |
| No. | Date of execution | Name | At execution | At offense | Age difference | Gender | Ethnicity | State | Method | Ref. |
|---|---|---|---|---|---|---|---|---|---|---|
| 1 | January 5, 2012 | Gary Roland Welch | 49 | 32 | 17 | Male | White | Oklahoma | Lethal injection | |
| 2 | January 26, 2012 | Rodrigo Hernandez | 38 | 20 | 18 | Male | Hispanic | Texas | Lethal injection | |
| 3 | February 8, 2012 | Edwin Hart Turner | 38 | 22 | 16 | Male | White | Mississippi | Lethal injection | |
| 4 | February 15, 2012 | Robert Brian Waterhouse | 65 | 33 | 32 | Male | White | Florida | Lethal injection | |
| 5 | February 29, 2012 | Robert Henry Moormann | 63 | 35 | 28 | Male | White | Arizona | Lethal injection | |
| 6 | February 29, 2012 | George Angel Rivas Jr. | 41 | 30 | 11 | Male | Hispanic | Texas | Lethal injection | |
| 7 | March 7, 2012 | Keith Steven Thurmond | 52 | 41 | 11 | Male | White | Texas | Lethal injection | |
| 8 | March 8, 2012 | Robert Charles Towery | 47 | 27 | 20 | Male | White | Arizona | Lethal injection | |
| 9 | March 15, 2012 | Timothy Shaun Stemple | 46 | 34 | 12 | Male | White | Oklahoma | Lethal injection | |
| 10 | March 20, 2012 | Larry Matthew Puckett | 35 | 18 | 17 | Male | White | Mississippi | Lethal injection | |
| 11 | March 22, 2012 | William Gerald Mitchell | 61 | 46 | 15 | Male | Black | Mississippi | Lethal injection | |
| 12 | March 28, 2012 | Jesse Joe Hernandez | 47 | 36 | 11 | Male | Hispanic | Texas | Lethal injection | |
| 13 | April 12, 2012 | David Alan Gore | 58 | 29 | 29 | Male | White | Florida | Lethal injection | |
| 14 | April 18, 2012 | Mark Wayne Wiles | 49 | 22 | 27 | Male | White | Ohio | Lethal injection | |
| 15 | April 20, 2012 | Shannon M. Johnson | 28 | 22 | 6 | Male | Black | Delaware | Lethal injection | |
| 16 | April 25, 2012 | Thomas Arnold Kemp | 63 | 44 | 19 | Male | White | Arizona | Lethal injection | |
| 17 | April 26, 2012 | Beunka Adams | 29 | 19 | 10 | Male | Black | Texas | Lethal injection | |
| 18 | May 1, 2012 | Michael Bascum Selsor | 57 | 20 | 37 | Male | White | Oklahoma | Lethal injection | |
| 19 | June 5, 2012 | Henry Curtis Jackson Jr. | 47 | 26 | 21 | Male | Black | Mississippi | Lethal injection | |
| 20 | June 12, 2012 | Richard Albert Leavitt | 53 | 25 | 28 | Male | White | Idaho | Lethal injection | |
| 21 | June 12, 2012 | Jan Michael Brawner | 34 | 23 | 11 | Male | White | Mississippi | Lethal injection | |
| 22 | June 20, 2012 | Gary Carl Simmons Jr. | 49 | 33 | 16 | Male | White | Mississippi | Lethal injection | |
| 23 | June 27, 2012 | Samuel Villegas Lopez | 49 | 24 | 25 | Male | Hispanic | Arizona | Lethal injection | |
| 24 | July 18, 2012 | Yokamon Laneal Hearn | 33 | 19 | 14 | Male | Black | Texas | Lethal injection | |
| 25 | August 7, 2012 | Marvin Lee Wilson | 54 | 34 | 20 | Male | Black | Texas | Lethal injection | |
| 26 | August 8, 2012 | Daniel Wayne Cook | 51 | 25 | 26 | Male | White | Arizona | Lethal injection | |
| 27 | August 14, 2012 | Michael Edward Hooper | 40 | 21 | 19 | Male | White | Oklahoma | Lethal injection | |
| 28 | September 20, 2012 | Donald L. Palmer | 47 | 24 | 23 | Male | White | Ohio | Lethal injection | |
| 29 | September 20, 2012 | Robert Wayne Harris | 40 | 28 | 12 | Male | Black | Texas | Lethal injection | |
| 30 | September 25, 2012 | Cleve Foster | 48 | 38 | 10 | Male | White | Texas | Lethal injection | |
| 31 | October 10, 2012 | Jonathan Marcus Green | 44 | 32 | 12 | Male | Black | Texas | Lethal injection | |
| 32 | October 15, 2012 | Eric Donald Robert | 50 | 48 | 2 | Male | White | South Dakota | Lethal injection | |
| 33 | October 24, 2012 | Bobby Lee Hines | 40 | 19 | 21 | Male | White | Texas | Lethal injection | |
| 34 | October 30, 2012 | Donald Eugene Moeller | 60 | 37 | 23 | Male | White | South Dakota | Lethal injection | |
| 35 | October 31, 2012 | Donnie Lee Roberts | 41 | 32 | 9 | Male | White | Texas | Lethal injection | |
| 36 | November 6, 2012 | Garry Thomas Allen | 56 | 30 | 26 | Male | Black | Oklahoma | Lethal injection | |
| 37 | November 8, 2012 | Mario Rashad Swain | 33 | 23 | 10 | Male | Black | Texas | Lethal injection | |
| 38 | November 13, 2012 | Brett Xavier Hartman | 38 | 23 | 15 | Male | White | Ohio | Lethal injection | |
| 39 | November 14, 2012 | Ramon Torres Hernandez | 41 | 30 | 11 | Male | Hispanic | Texas | Lethal injection | |
| 40 | November 15, 2012 | Preston Craig Hughes III | 46 | 22 | 24 | Male | Black | Texas | Lethal injection | |
| 41 | December 4, 2012 | George Ochoa | 38 | 18 | 20 | Male | Hispanic | Oklahoma | Lethal injection | |
| 42 | December 5, 2012 | Richard Dale Stokley | 60 | 38 | 22 | Male | White | Arizona | Lethal injection | |
| 43 | December 11, 2012 | Manuel Pardo Jr. | 56 | 29 | 27 | Male | Hispanic | Florida | Lethal injection | |
| | | Average: | 47 years | 29 years | 18 years | | | | | |

== Demographics ==
Gender
| Male | 43 | 100% |
| Female | 0 | 0% |
Ethnicity
| White | 25 | 58% |
| Black | 11 | 26% |
| Hispanic | 7 | 16% |
State
| Texas | 15 | 35% |
| Arizona | 6 | 14% |
| Mississippi | 6 | 14% |
| Oklahoma | 6 | 14% |
| Florida | 3 | 7% |
| Ohio | 3 | 7% |
| South Dakota | 2 | 5% |
| Delaware | 1 | 2% |
| Idaho | 1 | 2% |
Method
| Lethal injection | 43 | 100% |
Month
| January | 2 | 5% |
| February | 4 | 9% |
| March | 6 | 14% |
| April | 5 | 12% |
| May | 1 | 2% |
| June | 5 | 12% |
| July | 1 | 2% |
| August | 3 | 7% |
| September | 5 | 12% |
| October | 3 | 7% |
| November | 5 | 12% |
| December | 3 | 7% |
Age
| 20–29 | 2 | 5% |
| 30–39 | 9 | 21% |
| 40–49 | 17 | 40% |
| 50–59 | 9 | 21% |
| 60–69 | 6 | 14% |
| Total | 43 | 100% |

== Executions in recent years ==
Number of executions
| 2013 | 39 |
| 2012 | 43 |
| 2011 | 43 |
| Total | 125 |

== See also ==
- List of death row inmates in the United States
- List of most recent executions by jurisdiction
- List of people scheduled to be executed in the United States

| Preceded by 2011 | List of people executed in the United States in 2012 | Succeeded by 2013 |
