= Okeechobee Correctional Institution =

Prison in Florida, United States

Coordinates: 27°23′58″N 80°47′04″W

- Interactive map of Okeechobee Correctional Institution
- Location: 3420 NE 168th Street Okeechobee, Florida postal address
- Status: mixed
- Capacity: 1632
- Opened: 1995
- Managed by: Florida Department of Corrections

The Okeechobee Correctional Institution is a state prison for men located in unincorporated Okeechobee County, Florida, with an Okeechobee postal address. It is owned and operated by the Florida Department of Corrections.

Okeechobee has a mix of security levels, including minimum, medium, and close, and houses adult male offenders. The facility first opened in 1995 and has a maximum capacity of 1632 prisoners.

== Notable inmates ==
Current

- Donald Semenec (born 1975), One of several participants in the murder of Bobby Kent.
- Fred Waterfield (born 1952), The cousin and accomplice of serial killer David Alan Gore. He was later transferred to Hardee Correctional Institution.

Former

- Michael Woodbury, who was serving three life sentences for a 2007 New Hampshire triple murder under a interstate compact order, before he was transferred to death row for the 2017 killing of Antoneeze Haynes at the Okeechobee Correctional Institution.
- Pedro Bravo - Murdered University of Florida student Christian Aguilar in September 2012. Bravo died in prison in March 2025.
