= Michael Woodbury =

American convicted serial killer (born 1975)

Michael Lawrence Woodbury
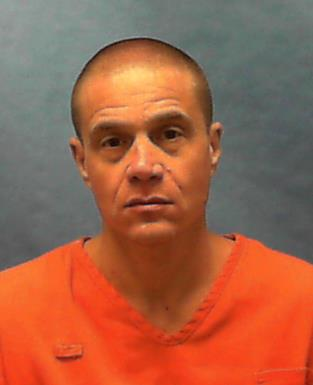
- Woodbury's mugshot
- Born: December 31, 1975 (age 50); Windham, Maine, U.S.
- Status: Incarcerated on death row
- Convictions: New Hampshire: First-degree murder (×3); Florida: First-degree murder
- Penalty: New Hampshire: Life without parole (×3; consecutive); Florida: Death

Details
- Victims: 4
- Date: 2007 – 2017
- Country: United States
- States: New Hampshire, Florida
- Locations: Conway, New Hampshire; Okeechobee County, Florida
- Imprisoned at: Union Correctional Institution

Michael Lawrence Woodbury (born December 31, 1975) is an American serial killer convicted of murdering four people between 2007 and 2017. On July 2, 2007, Woodbury committed a shooting that killed three people at an Army Barracks store in Conway, New Hampshire, and as a result of the triple murder, Woodbury was charged and pleaded guilty to three counts of first-degree murder, and sentenced to life without parole.

Woodbury was eventually transferred from New Hampshire to Florida to serve his life sentences, and on September 22, 2017, Woodbury committed the murder of his cellmate Antoneeze Haynes at the Okeechobee Correctional Institution. For the charge of killing Haynes, Woodbury was sentenced to death in Florida and is currently incarcerated on death row at the Union Correctional Institution.

== Early life ==
Born on December 31, 1975, Michael Lawrence Woodbury was adopted at the age of seven after his biological father gave him up for adoption. Woodbury grew up in the Dundee Park neighborhood of Windham, Maine, where he attended the local school system through the tenth grade. According to his adoptive father, Woodbury did not participate in any extracurricular activities. Neighbors recalled that, as a child, Woodbury spent time building forts in the woods and swimming with friends near the Great Falls Dam, an area known at the time for fighting and drug activity. One neighbor remembered an incident in which Woodbury and his friends threw rocks at younger children who approached their fort, but noted that he later came to apologize on his own and was "very polite."

Woodbury entered the criminal justice system at age sixteen when he was imprisoned for armed robbery. While incarcerated, he earned his GED. Over the following years, he spent most of his adult life in prison for robbery and theft offenses, serving time in facilities including the Cumberland County Correctional Center in Maine, a prison in Florida, and the super-maximum security unit at Maine State Prison in Warren. In the most recent case before his arrest for murder, Woodbury was released from prison on May 5, 2007, after serving a five-year sentence for armed robbery.

After his release in May 2007, Woodbury embarked on a month-long multi-state crime spree that stretched across six states in total. Of all the cases, he committed a bank robbery in Florence, South Carolina on June 6, 2007, and also broke into a million-dollar home in St. Simons Island, Georgia on June 12, 2007, before he set the house on fire. He also stole a car in Kentucky and fled to Chattanooga, Tennessee, where he committed an armed robbery at a clothing store on June 19, 2007. During this period, Woodbury was nearly caught twice by the police, once in Kentucky before he stole the car to escape to Tennessee, and another in Tennessee, where he managed to evade the pursuing officers after the robbery.

== 2007 Conway triple murders ==
On July 2, 2007, in Conway, New Hampshire, Michael Woodbury perpetuated a shooting that led to the murders of three people at an Army Barracks store.

On that day, Woodbury entered the store with the intention to commit robbery, and he was armed with a gun. While inside the store, Woodbury shot and killed the 34-year-old store manager James Walker, who reportedly suspected him for thievery and leaned below the counter before Woodbury brandished his gun to shoot him.

After killing Walker, Woodbury ran out of the store and encountered another two men, 23-year-old Gary Jones and 25-year-old William Jones, who were both friends from Massachusetts and happened to stop by the store on their way home after hiking. According to Woodbury, the duo were in "the wrong place at the wrong time" and he shot them just as they tried to stop him. William Jones died at the scene, while Gary Jones was rushed to the Maine Medical Center, where he later died from his injuries.

An autopsy report revealed that all the three men died as a result of lethal gunshot wounds: both Walker and William Jones died as a result of multiple gunshot wounds to the head, while the cause of Gary Jones's death was a single gunshot injury on his head. Walker, the only one of the three victims who was married, was survived by his wife and two young children.

== First murder trial ==
Shortly after he committed the murders, Michael Woodbury was arrested in Fryeburg, Maine, due to a witness spotting Woodbury, who matched the description of the suspected Conway Army Barracks store shooter, walking on railroad tracks in Fryeburg, about 10 miles east of Conway. After his capture, Woodbury was held at the Oxford County Jail in Paris, Maine. He was charged by the New Hampshire authorities with three counts of first-degree murder on July 4, 2007.

On July 6, 2007, Woodbury was brought to a Maine state court to attend an extradition hearing, and he subsequently waived extradition to New Hampshire, prompting the authorities to bring him back to the state to face charges for the triple shooting.

On July 7, 2007, after his return to New Hampshire, Woodbury was brought to court and formally arraigned on three counts of first-degree murder.

On August 9, 2007, it was reported that a plea deal was reached between the prosecution and defence, and Woodbury agreed to plead guilty to three counts of first-degree murder and face life imprisonment without the chance for parole, in exchange for a better choice of prison. Woodbury was scheduled to attend a court hearing the following week to formally enter his plea.

On August 18, 2007, Woodbury officially pleaded guilty to three counts of first-degree murder in court, and after he entered the plea, Judge Edward Fitzgerald sentenced Woodbury to three consecutive life sentences without the possibility of parole.

In 2009, with pursuant to an interstate compact order, the New Hampshire authorities transferred Woodbury to the custody of the Florida Department of Corrections, and he was first incarcerated at the Union Correctional Institution. According to official records, Woodbury was cited in a disciplinary report in May 2009 for beating and strangling a fellow prisoner, reportedly because the said inmate was a convicted child molester. By 2017, Woodbury was moved to the Okeechobee Correctional Institution to continue serving his life sentences.

In July 2012, while he was incarcerated for the triple murders, Woodbury claimed in a letter that he intended to commit carjacking on the day he killed the three victims. Woodbury admitted that the reason he accepted the plea bargain and admit to the murders was because he did not want to face the death penalty for carjacking, which was a capital offence under federal law. While it was possible for the federal authorities to prosecute Woodbury for carjacking, the New Hampshire's U.S. Attorney decided to not bring forward new charges because Woodbury was already serving life in prison for the triple murder and there was no necessity to try Woodbury for carjacking.

== Murder of Antoneeze Haynes ==
On September 22, 2017, ten years after the Conway triple shooting, Michael Woodbury committed the murder of his cellmate at the Okeechobee Correctional Institution.

On that day, Woodbury barricaded the door to his prison cell and attacked his 52-year-old cellmate, Antoneeze Haynes (September 2, 1965 – September 22, 2017), and he brutally beaten up Haynes using his fists, boots and some makeshift weapons, including a padlock. The assault lasted for four hours, and while holding Haynes hostage, Woodbury demanded the correction officers to satisfy his requests or he would continue to harm Haynes, and at one point, Woodbury told the officers to remove the medical equipment they brought to treat Haynes. Eventually, Woodbury surrendered after he realized that a forceful extraction was imminent.

At the time of his death, Haynes was serving five consecutive life sentences since 1993 for two counts of attempted kidnapping, one count each of attempted murder, armed robbery and armed burglary. These charges were related to a 1990 robbery case in which Haynes hogtied and shot a man in his Coral Springs home during a robbery bid, and even forced the housekeeper to strip and help open a safe.

According to the medical examiner, Haynes died as a result of severe blunt force trauma, and he suffered several brain hemorrhages and bruises, 11 laceration and abrasions to the torso, 21 lacerations and abrasions to both his skull and face, and fractures to nearly all his ribs and sternum. Haynes also had a missing tooth, broken fingers and toes, and a broken jaw bone.

== Second murder trial ==
On March 13, 2018, an Okeechobee County grand jury formally indicted Michael Woodbury on one count of first-degree premeditated murder. The prosecution announced that they would seek the death penalty for Woodbury.

Merely two months after he was indicted, Woodbury stood trial on May 17, 2018, and he was allowed to represent himself after he was found competent to do so. During the proceedings, Assistant State Attorney Don Richardson described the severity of the injuries sustained by the victim during the opening statement phase, and the medical examiner supported this by testifying that the injuries sustained by Haynes, which were consistent with being caused by a padlock, were so severe that it resulted in his death by massive blood loss from severe amounts of physical trauma. As for Woodbury, he testified that the reason why he attacked Haynes was because the victim tried to rape him while he was asleep in the middle of the night.

On May 21, 2018, the third day of his trial, Woodbury changed his plea to "guilty as charged", and as a result, Woodbury was convicted of the first-degree murder charge, and he faced the possibility of a death sentence or life imprisonment without the possibility of parole. A sentencing trial was scheduled tentatively on July 23, 2018, before a 12-member jury.

On July 25, 2018, by a unanimous decision, the jury agreed that Woodbury should be sentenced to death for the murder of Antoneeze Haynes, after a two-day sentencing trial.

On September 24, 2018, Judge Sherwood Bauer formally sentenced Woodbury to death for murdering Haynes.

== Appeals ==
By January 2019, Michael Woodbury was listed as one of the 103 Central Florida inmates detained on the state's death row.

In October 2019, Woodbury officially filed an appeal through his lawyers to the Florida Supreme Court, where they submitted that Woodbury's sentence should not stand in light of the evidence of his psychiatric condition at the time of the offence.

On April 15, 2021, the Florida Supreme Court rejected Woodbury's direct appeal against his death sentence.

On December 1, 2021, Woodbury appealed to the U.S. Supreme Court against his death sentence, and the state prosecution were also granted a month's extension to prepare for a reply to Woodbury's petition. The state responded on January 24, 2022, asking the U.S. Supreme Court to reject the appeal.

Three months later, February 24, 2022, the U.S. Supreme Court dismissed Woodbury's appeal against his sentence.

On June 11, 2026, Woodbury's second appeal was denied by the Florida Supreme Court.

As of 2026, Woodbury remains incarcerated on death row at the Union Correctional Institution.

== See also ==
- Capital punishment in Florida
- List of death row inmates in the United States § Florida
- List of serial killers in the United States
