= David Alan Gore =

American serial killer

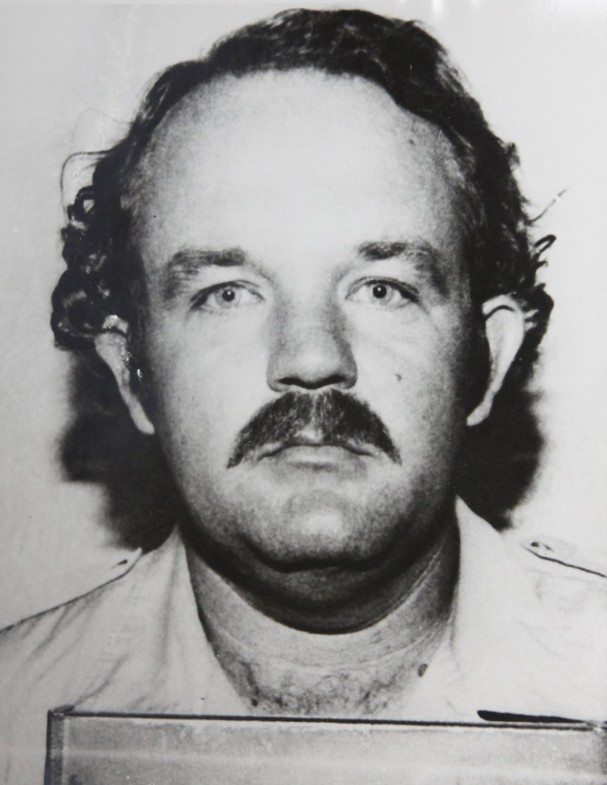
- Born: August 21, 1953; Florida, U.S.
- Died: April 12, 2012 (aged 58); Florida State Prison, Florida, U.S.
- Other names: The Killing Cousins; The eyes of the devil
- Status: Executed by lethal injection
- Convictions: First degree murder (6 counts); Kidnapping (2 counts); Sexual battery (3 counts); Trespassing while armed
- Penalty: Death

Details
- Victims: 6
- Span of crimes: 1981–1983
- Country: United States
- State: Florida
- Date apprehended: July 26, 1983

Fred Waterfield
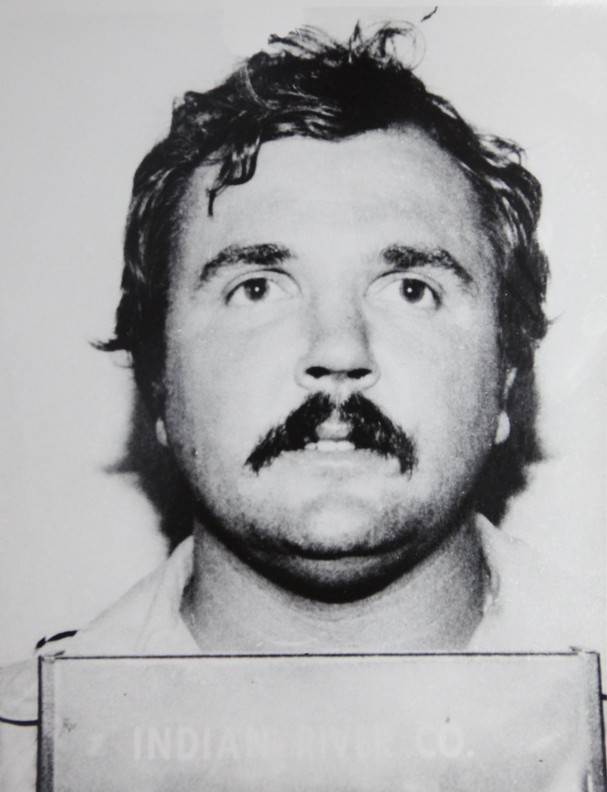
- Born: September 29, 1952 (age 74); New Jersey, U.S.
- Other name: The Killing Cousins
- Status: Incarcerated
- Conviction: First degree murder (2 counts)
- Penalty: Life imprisonment (minimum of 50 years)

Details
- Victims: 6
- Span of crimes: 1981–1983
- Country: United States
- State: Florida
- Date apprehended: July 26, 1983

David Alan Gore (August 21, 1953 – April 12, 2012) was an American serial killer who committed six murders in Vero Beach and Indian River County, Florida, from 1981 to 1983. He was accompanied in several of the murders by his cousin, Fred Waterfield, and both have collectively been dubbed the Killing Cousins. Gore was sentenced to death and executed by lethal injection in 2012, having been on Florida's death row for twenty-eight years, while Waterfield is currently serving two consecutive life sentences.

In 1976, prior to the murders, police jailed and questioned both Gore and Waterfield after 20-year-old Angela Hommell Austin accused them of raping her at gunpoint. The cousins insisted the sex was consensual, and they were not charged in her case. Gore targeted at least four additional women who escaped with their lives.

== Background ==
David Alan Gore was born on August 21, 1953, in Florida. When he was a teenager, he was fired from his first job as a gas station attendant after his boss found a hole that allowed Gore to look into the women's bathroom. Gore was an auxiliary sheriff's deputy and used his badge to commit some of his crimes. Gore also worked as a caretaker of a citrus grove that provided a secluded area in which to rape and murder his victims.

Fred Waterfield was born on September 29, 1952, in New Jersey. He is a former high school football player.

Gore and Waterfield came to an arrangement, namely that Gore would spot, stalk, and secure potential victims for himself and Waterfield, in exchange for cash payments from Waterfield.

== Victims ==
=== Hsiang Huang Ling and Ying Hua Ling ===
Gore's and Waterfield's first two murder victims were Ying Hua Ling (age 17) and her mother Hsiang Huang Ling (age 48). On February 19, 1981, Gore accosted Ying Ling and brandished his auxiliary police badge to lure the teenager into his truck, after which he drove her to her own home. Once there, he encountered Hsiang Ling and kidnapped both women. Gore later claimed that the mother, tied to a tree, slowly choked to death while he and Waterfield raped the daughter. The pair dismembered the two women and stuffed their body parts into oil drums, which they buried.

=== Judith Kay Daley ===
The pair's third victim was Judith Daley (age 35), a former Fort Pierce resident visiting from California. On July 15, 1981, Gore disabled Daley's car at the beach, and then offered her a ride to the nearest telephone. Gore drove Daley to a secluded area and met Waterfield, whereupon both men raped Daley. Gore claimed to have disposed of Daley's body in a swamp.

One week after Daley's murder, Gore unsuccessfully attempted to abduct a teenage girl using his auxiliary badge. The girl's father filed a complaint, and Gore was stripped of his badge. Days later, police spotted Gore hiding in the back seat of a woman's car, carrying a police scanner, handcuffs, and a pistol. Gore was convicted of armed trespassing and sentenced to five years in prison, but was released on parole in March 1983.

=== Barbara Ann Byer and Angelica LaVallee ===
On May 20, 1983, Gore and Waterfield encountered Orlando hitchhikers Angelica LaVallee and Barbara Ann Byer (both age 14) and picked them up. Gore and Waterfield raped, killed and dismembered both girls. These are the only two crimes for which Waterfield was convicted; he was sentenced to two consecutive life sentences for the two murders.

=== Lynn Elliott and Regan Martin ===
Lynn Elliott (age 17) and Regan Martin (age 14), students at Vero Beach High School, were hitchhiking to Wabasso Beach when Gore and Waterfield picked them up on July 26, 1983. They took both girls to a house owned by Gore's parents. Waterfield soon left, spooked by having seen his sister during the drive. Gore later told police that he bound and placed the girls in different rooms prior to raping them.

As he was assaulting Martin, Lynn Elliot—nude, with her hands tied behind her back—escaped to the driveway, until she lost her footing. According to Gore, "I kept running after her then she tripped and fell and then I caught up to her". Gore told police "I started dragging her back and she was trying, like, resisting, fighting me, so I threw her to the ground. That's when I shot her in the head".

Gore shot her twice at point-blank range only to realize that a neighbor's son riding his bicycle had witnessed the entire incident. The boy alerted police, which led to a 90-minute standoff between Gore and law enforcement. The police arrested Gore and rescued Martin, who was found in the attic naked, handcuffed, and with electrical cords tied around her legs.

On December 7, 1983, Gore led police to the remains of three of his six murder victims. These victims were Barbara Ann Byer, Hsiang Huang Ling and her daughter, Ying Hua Ling. He also admitted to killing three girls and two women.

== Case timeline ==
- August 10, 1983: A grand jury charged Gore with first-degree murder with two counts of kidnapping and two counts of sexual battery.
- January 6, 1984: Gore's trial was moved from Vero Beach to St. Petersburg, Florida. Two months after on March 16, 1984, the jury convicted him of first-degree murder and after an 11–1 vote he received the death sentence.
- August 22, 1985: The Supreme Court affirmed Gore's first-degree murder conviction and death penalty.
- January 21, 1985: Waterfield was convicted of the murders of Byer and LaVellee, and received two consecutive life sentences.
- March 3, 1988: Governor Bob Martinez signed Gore's death warrant.
- July 5, 2007: the Florida Supreme Court confirmed Gore's death sentence.

== Death ==
Gore was executed by lethal injection at 6:19 p.m. on Thursday, April 12, 2012, having exhausted all legal appeals. As Gore lay strapped to a gurney in the death chamber, he said: "I'm sorry. I've had remorse ... I'm not the man I was back then. I don't fear death."

Waterfield was originally imprisoned at Okeechobee Correctional Institution, but was later moved to Hardee Correctional Institution. He has maintained his innocence and his family has made efforts on his behalf to prove his innocence.

== See also ==
- List of people executed in Florida
- List of people executed in the United States in 2012
- List of serial killers in the United States

Executions carried out in Florida
Preceded by Robert Brian Waterhouse February 15, 2012	David Alan Gore; April 12, 2012	Succeeded by Manuel Pardo Jr. December 11, 2012
Executions carried out in the United States
Preceded by Jesse Joe Hernandez – Texas March 28, 2012	David Alan Gore – Florida; April 12, 2012	Succeeded by Mark Wayne Wiles – Ohio April 18, 2012
