= String Quartet No. 2 (Kernis) =

String quartet by Aaron Jay Kernis

String Quartet No. 2, Musica Instrumentalis (1997) is a string quartet by Aaron Jay Kernis (b. 1960), inspired by renaissance and baroque dances, composed for the Lark Quartet and awarded the Pulitzer Prize in 1998, with a special citation to George Gershwin. His first quartet being named Musica celestis:

My new string quartet started off because I wanted to deal with baroque dance forms and medieval dance rhythms. There wasn't an image—it developed from purely musical ideas. This was a case where the piece turned out to be formally very different from what I first expected. I thought it would be five movements, but I started cannibalizing one movement into another and wound up with three. The first movement is like a dance medley, with a first big A section and a closing A section that is a development of the opening medley. Stuck in the middle of these two A's is a minuet and trio that originally was an entirely separate movement. While working on the first movement, I decided that the relaxation that I needed between those A sections was one of the smaller movements I'd already conceived. So I took one and squashed it in. That's one way that a piece can become significantly transformed during the act of composition.

— Kernis (2003),

The piece was premiered by the Lark Quartet in January 1998 at Merkin Concert Hall. It has been recorded by the Lark Quartet and Jasper String Quartet.

It was commissioned by the Lark Quartet by the Elaine Kaufman Cultural Center in New York City, Ohio University, and The Schubert Club of St. Paul, with additional funds from Chamber Music America. It is dedicated to Linda Hoeschler "in gratitude for her friendship, generosity, and support, and in honor of her perpetual faith in the creative spirit."
