= Thomas French =

American journalist (born 1958)

- Born: January 3, 1958 (age 68); Columbus, Ohio, U.S.
- Education: Indiana University Bloomington (BA)
- Occupations: Writer, journalist
- Spouse(s): Linda Rogowski (Divorced); Kelley Benham (2006–present)
- Children: 3

Thomas French (born January 3, 1958) is an American writer and journalist.

== Life ==
French was born on January 3, 1958, to Hans and Katherine (née Darst) French in Columbus, Ohio and was raised in Indianapolis, Indiana. While at Indiana University Bloomington, he was the editor-in-chief of the Indiana Daily Student, the recipient of a Poynter scholarship, the winner of the Hearst Competition for Feature Writing, and graduated in 1980. His first marriage was to Linda French (née Rogowski). French has two sons, Nathaniel and Samuel. He married Kelley Benham in 2006. Benham documented the birth of their daughter Juniper, who was born an extreme preemie in the series "Never Let Go," published in the Tampa Bay Times, for which she was a finalist for the 2013 Pulitzer Prize for Feature Writing.

== Career ==
Thomas French's career with the St. Petersburg Times spanned 27 years between 1981 and 2008. He is known for feature writing but he started off on the police and courts beats, as well as general assignments. He is the Riley Endowed Chair in journalism in the Media School at Indiana University Bloomington.

== Notable works of journalism ==
In 1998, the Times won its sixth Pulitzer Prize. French won for Feature Writing for his piece “Angels and Demons,” the story of the murders of Jo, Michelle and Christe Rogers and the eventual capture of the murderer, Oba Chandler.

French wrote the series "South of Heaven," later expanded into a book of narrative nonfiction, about students at the end of the 1980s at Largo High School with the cooperation of LHS journalism teacher Jan Amburgy.

He collaborated on "13", a mini-series that ran in the St. Petersburg Times about middle schoolers at Booker T. Washington Middle Magnet School for International Studies in Tampa.

According to Washington Post reporter Anne Hull, French's work has set the standard for a generation of reporters:

He wrote a seminal piece of journalism called 'A Cry In The Night' that dominated our craft for a long time and made a model for the rest of us to follow," Hull said. "He's been my teacher since the day I met him. IU will soon get a glimpse of his passion and ferocious belief that journalism should be fair and truthful but also raucous, subversive, emotional and daring.

His 2010 book about Lowry Park Zoo in Tampa, Florida is called Zoo Story: Life in the Garden of Captives.

== Awards ==
In 1992, Thomas French won the Livingston Award for Young Journalists for his local reporting on a high school.

In 1998, French won the Pulitzer Prize for Feature Writing.

In 2015, French was inducted into the Indiana Journalism Hall of Fame.

== Works ==
- A Year in the Life of a High School
- Angels & Demons
- Never Let Go, written by wife Kelley Benham about the couple's daughter
