= Metropolitan Bureau of Investigation =

The Metropolitan Bureau of Investigation is an 18-agency law enforcement task force in Central Florida that was set up by the Ninth Judicial Circuit Court of Florida in 1978 to target vice, narcotics, and organized crime.
