= Cooper (surname) =

- Pronunciation: /ˈkuːpə(ɹ)/ (Received Pronunciation) /ˈkupɚ/ (General American, Canada) /ˈkʉːpə(ɹ)/ (Australia, New Zealand)

Origin
- Origin: Old English
- Region of origin: England

Other names
- Variant form: Numerous

Cooper is a surname.

In England, it was occupational surname, that is, derived from an occupation; in this case the maker and repairer of wooden barrels, casks, vats, etc., known as a cooper. The name evolved from the Middle English couper or cowper, which in turn derives from Middle Dutch kūper (kūp meaning "tub container").

In Scotland, the name Cooper was derived from the town of Cupar, in Fife (originating from Cu—pyre, the enclosed or high fire). In the late 19th century, the name was distributed across England, but most common in three main regions: the northern midlands; Sussex and Hampshire; and Suffolk.

Related names are the Dutch Kuiper, and the German Kupfer, Kupper, and Kuper.

== A ==
- Adam Cooper (dancer) (born 1971), actor, choreographer, dancer and theater director
- Adrian Cooper (born 1968), American football tight end
- Adrienne Cooper (1946–2011), American Yiddish singer, musician and activist
- Afua Cooper (born 1957), Jamaican-Canadian poet and academic
- Alan Cooper (bishop) (1909–1999), British Anglican bishop
- Alan Cooper (software designer) (born 1952), American creator of Visual Basic
- Alan Cooper (biblical scholar), American
- Albert Cooper (disambiguation), multiple people
- Alex Cooper (architect) (born 1936), American architect
- Alex Cooper (footballer) (born 1991), Scottish footballer
- Alexander Cooper (1609–1660), English painter
- Alfred Cooper (disambiguation), multiple people
- Alice Cooper (born 1948), born Vincent Damon Furnier, American Singer and musician
- Alison Cooper (born 1966), British businesswoman
- Allen Foster Cooper (1838–1918), American politician
- Amari Cooper (born 1994), American football wide receiver
- Anderson Cooper (born 1967), American journalist
- Andre Cooper (born 1975), American football wide receiver
- Andrew Cooper (disambiguation), multiple people
- Anez Cooper (born 2004), American football player
- Angus Cooper (born 1964), New Zealand hammer thrower
- Ann Cooper Whitall (1716–1797), American Quaker
- Ann Nixon Cooper (1902–2009), African-American representative
- Anna J. Cooper (1859–1964), African-American educator
- Anthony Ashley-Cooper (disambiguation), 10 of the 12 Earls of Shaftesbury
- Anton Cooper (born 1994), New Zealand cross-country mountain biker
- Arif Cooper (died 2023), Jamaican musician
- Armando Cooper (born 1987), Panamanian footballer
- Artemis Cooper (born 1953), British writer
- Ashley Cooper (disambiguation), multiple people
- Astley Cooper (1768–1841), English surgeon
- Audrey Cooper (born 1977), American journalist

== B ==
- Barbara Cooper (politician) (1929–2022), American politician
- Barbara Cooper (RAF officer) (born 1959), British Royal Air Force officer
- Barry Cooper (disambiguation), multiple people
- Ben Cooper (disambiguation), multiple people
- Bernard Cooper (born 1951), American novelist
- Bert Cooper (American football) (born 1952), American football player
- Bert Cooper (1966–2019), American boxer
- Bertie Cooper (1892–1916), Australian rules footballer
- Besse Cooper (1896–2012), American supercentenarian and world's oldest person during 2011–2012
- Bette Cooper (1924–2017), Miss America 1937
- Bill and Billy Cooper (disambiguation), multiple people
  - Bill Cooper (American football) (born 1939), professional football player for the San Francisco 49ers
  - Bill Cooper (hurler) (born 1987), Irish hurler
    - Billy Cooper (footballer) (1917–1978), English footballer
    - Billy Cooper (Canadian football) (born 1945), Canadian football player
    - Billy Cooper (trumpeter), cricket supporter and trumpet player for the Barmy Army
- Blake Cooper (born 2001), American actor
- Bob Cooper (disambiguation), multiple people
  - Bob Cooper (musician) (1925–1993), American jazz musician
  - Bob Cooper (racing driver) (born 1935), American NASCAR Cup Series driver
  - Bob Cooper (politician) (1936–2004), politician and activist in Northern Ireland
  - Bob Cooper (speedway rider) (born 1950), English speedway rider
  - Bob Cooper (journalist) (born 1954), freelance writer and Runner's World columnist, ultramarathoner
  - Bob Cooper (rugby league), Australian former professional rugby league footballer
- Bonnie Cooper (1935–2018), All-American Girls Professional Baseball League player.
- BP Cooper, American screenwriter, film and commercial producer
- Brad Cooper (swimmer) (born 1954), Australian swimmer
- Brad Cooper (born 1959), Australian businessman who played a central role in the collapse of HIH Insurance
- Brad Cooper (admiral) (born 1967), United States Navy officer
- B. Cooper (Brad Alan Cooper, born 1984), American rapper
- Brad Cooper (General Hospital), a fictional character that has appeared in the TV series since 2013
- Bradley Cooper (athlete) (born 1957), Bahamian discus thrower and shot putter
- Bradley Cooper (born 1975), American actor
- Bransby Cooper (1844–1914), Australian cricketer
- Brenda Cooper, American author
- Brent Cooper (judoka) (born 1960), New Zealand Olympic judoka and judo administrator
- Bret Cooper (born 1970), American football player
- Brett Cooper (footballer) (born 1959), Australian rules footballer
- Brett Cooper (fighter) (born 1987), American mixed martial artist
- Brett Cooper (political commentator) (born 2001), American actress and political commentator
- Brian Cooper (disambiguation), multiple people
- Britney Cooper (born 1989), West Indian cricketer from Trinidad
- Brittnee Cooper (born 1988), American volleyball player
- Bryan Cooper (politician) (1884–1930), Irish politician
- Bryan Cooper (jockey) (born 1992), Irish National Hunt jockey
- Bump Cooper Jr. (born 2001), American football player
- Buster Cooper (1929–2016), American jazz trombonist

== C ==
- Caitlin Cooper (born 1988), Australian soccer player
- Calico Cooper (born 1981), American actor, dancer, and singer, the daughter of rock singer Alice Cooper and dancer Sheryl Cooper
- Camille Cooper (born 1979), American basketball player
- Carl Cooper (born 1960), British Anglican bishop
- Carolyn Cooper (born 1950), Jamaican author
- Cary Cooper (born 1940), American-born British psychologist
- Cathy Cooper (born 1960), American artist
- Cec Cooper (1926–2010), Australian rugby league footballer
- Cecil Cooper (bishop) (1882–1964), British Bishop
- Cecil Cooper (born 1949), American baseball player
- Charles Cooper (disambiguation), multiple people
- Charlotte Cooper (disambiguation), multiple people
- Chris Cooper (disambiguation), multiple people
- Christin Cooper (born 1959), American skier
- Clarence Cooper (disambiguation), multiple people
- Colin Cooper (disambiguation), multiple people
- Colm Cooper (born 1983), Irish Gaelic footballer
- Constance May Cooper (1881–1964), medical doctor in South Australia
- Courtney Ryley Cooper (1886–1940), American circus clown
- Craig Cooper (disambiguation), multiple people
- Curtis Cooper (disambiguation), multiple people
- Cynthia Cooper (disambiguation), multiple people

== D ==
- Dalton Cooper (born 2001), American football player
- Daniel C. Cooper (1773–1818), early American surveyor and politician
- Darius Cooper (born 2001), American football player
- Darryl Cooper, American historian
- D. B. Cooper, epithet for an unknown airline hijacker from 1971. Also known as Dan Cooper
- D. C. Cooper (born 1965), American heavy metal singer
- D. J. Cooper (born 1990), American basketball player in the Israeli Basketball Premier League
- David Cooper (disambiguation), multiple people
- Darren Cooper (died 2016), British Labour Party politician
- Dennis Cooper (born 1953), American poet and writer
- Derrek Cooper (born 2008), American football player
- Dewey Cooper (born 1974), American kickboxer and boxer
- Lady Diana Cooper (1892–1986), British actress
- Dolores G. Cooper (1922–1999), American politician
- Dominic Cooper (born 1978), British actor
- Don Cooper (born 1957), American baseball player
- Don Cooper (curler) (born c.1942), American curler
- Douglas Cooper (disambiguation), multiple people
- Duff Cooper (1890–1954), British politician and writer

== E ==
- Earl Cooper (1886–1965), American race car driver
- Eddie Cooper (actor) (born 1987), British actor
- Eddie Cooper (cricketer) (1915–1968), English cricketer
- Edmund Cooper (1926–1982), English writer
- Edward Cooper (disambiguation), multiple people
- Edwin Cooper (1785–1833), English artist
- Ethan Cooper, American football player
- Elizabeth Cooper (died 1960), Filipino-American actress
- Emma Lampert Cooper (1855–1920), American painter
- Eric Cooper (1966–2019), American professional baseball umpire
- Eric Thirkell Cooper, British soldier and war poet during World War 1

== F ==
- Frank Cooper (disambiguation), multiple people
- Frederic Taber Cooper (1864–1937), American writer, editor and academic
- Frederick Cooper (disambiguation), multiple people

== G ==
- G. Cooper (Surrey cricketer), English amateur cricketer
- Gareth Cooper, Wales rugby union player
- Garrett Cooper, American baseball player
- Gary Cooper (disambiguation), multiple people
- George Cooper (disambiguation), multiple people
- Gladys Cooper (1888–1971), English actress
- Gordon Cooper (1927–2004), American astronaut
- Graham Cooper (cricketer) (1936–2012), English cricketer
- Grant Cooper (born 1982), Spanish millionaire
- Grey Cooper (1720–1801), English politician

== H ==
- Harry Cooper (disambiguation), multiple people
- Helen Cooper (disambiguation), multiple people
- Helene Cooper (born 1966), Liberian-American author and journalist
- Henry Cooper (disambiguation), multiple people
- Hugh Lincoln Cooper (1865–1937), American engineer
- Humility Cooper, English passenger on the Mayflower

== I ==
- Ian Cooper (disambiguation), multiple people
- Imogen Cooper, English pianist
- Ivan Cooper (1944–2019), Northern Ireland politician

== J ==
- Jack Cooper (disambiguation), multiple people
- Jacki Cooper (born 1967), English-born Australian jazz singer
- Jackie Cooper (1922–2011), American actor
- Jacqui Cooper (born 1973), Australian skier
- Jade Holland Cooper (born 1986/1987), British fashion designer
- James Cooper (disambiguation), multiple people
- Jeanne Cooper (1928–2013), American actress
- Jeff Cooper (disambiguation), multiple people
- Jenny Cooper (born 1974), Canadian actress
- Jenny Cooper (lawyer), corporate lawyer and Queen's Counsel from New Zealand
- Jere Cooper (1893–1957), American politician
- Jeremiah Cooper (born 2004), American football player
- Jerry W. Cooper (1948–2020), American politician
- Jessica Cooper (born 1967), British artist
- Jessie Cooper (1914–1993), Australian politician
- Jillie Cooper (born 1988), Scottish badminton player
- Jilly Cooper (1937–2025), English writer
- Jim Cooper (disambiguation), multiple people
- Jimmy Cooper (disambiguation), multiple people
- Joan Cooper (social worker) (1914–1999), English civil servant and social worker
- Job Adams Cooper (1843–1899), American politician
- Joe Cooper (disambiguation), multiple people
- John Cooper (disambiguation), multiple people
- Johnny Cooper (disambiguation), multiple people
- Jonathon Cooper (born 1998), American football player
- Joseph Cooper (disambiguation), multiple people
- Joshua Cooper (disambiguation), multiple people
- Julie Cooper (disambiguation), multiple people
- Justin Cooper (disambiguation), multiple people
- Justine Cooper (disambiguation), multiple people

== K ==
- Kate Cooper, historian
- Katharine Cooper Cater
- Keith Cooper (referee) (born 1948), Welsh football referee
- Keith D. Cooper, American computer scientist
- Keith Cooper Jr. (born 2003), American football player
- Kendall Cooper (born 2002), Canadian ice hockey player
- Kenneth H. Cooper (born 1931), American Air Force colonel, doctor and aerobics pioneer
- Kenny Cooper (born 1984), American soccer player
- Kenny Cooper Sr. (born 1946), former English soccer goalkeeper and coach
- Kevin Cooper (disambiguation), multiple people
- Kevon Cooper (born 1989), Trinidadian cricketer
- Kitty Cooper, American bridge player
- Korey Cooper (born 1972), American musician, member of Skillet
- Kyle Cooper (born 1962), American designer of motion picture title sequences
- Kyle Cooper (rugby union) (born 1989), South African rugby union player

== L ==
- Lamart Cooper (born 1973), American football player
- Leigh Cooper (born 1961), English footballer
- Leo Cooper (born 1922), Polish-born Australian historian
- Leo Cooper (1934–2013), British publisher
- Leon Cooper (1930–2024), American physicist
- Les Cooper (1921–2013), American musician
- Lettice Cooper (1897–1994), English writer
- Levi Cooper – The Maggid of Melbourne, Australian Orthodox Jewish teacher
- Lindsay Cooper (1951–2013), English musician (bassoon and oboe), composer and activist
- Lindsay L. Cooper (1940–2001), Scottish musician (double-bass and cello)
- Lionel Cooper, Australian rugby league player
- Lionel Cooper (1915–1979), South African mathematician
- Lisa Cooper (born 1963), American physician
- Louise Cooper (disambiguation), multiple people

== M ==
- MacDella Cooper (born 1977), Liberian philanthropist
- Malcolm Cooper (1947–2001), British sport shooter
- Malcolm Cooper (footballer), Aboriginal Australian footballer
- Marc Cooper, American journalist and blogger
- Margot Cooper (1918–2010), British woman soldier
- Marianne Leone Cooper (born 1952), American actress
- Mark Cooper (disambiguation), multiple people
- Marquis Cooper (1982–2009), American football player
- Martha Cooper (born c. 1940), American photojournalist
- Martin Cooper (disambiguation), multiple people
- Mary Cooper (died 1761), English bookseller and publisher
- Matt Cooper (disambiguation), multiple people
- Matthew Cooper (disambiguation), multiple people
- Maurice Cooper (1898–1918), British military aviator
- Merian C. Cooper (1893–1973), American movie actor, director, screenwriter and producer
- Michael Cooper (disambiguation), multiple people
- Mike Cooper (disambiguation), multiple people
- Mikquale T. Cooper (2004–2026), American rapper
- Milton William Cooper (1943–2001), American writer
- Miranda Cooper (born 1975), British songwriter
- Mort Cooper (1913–1958), American baseball player
- Muriel Cooper (1925–1994), American artist and designer
- Myers Y. Cooper (1873–1958), American politician

== N ==
- Nancy Cooper, American journalist, editor of Newsweek
- Nathan Cooper (disambiguation), multiple people
- Neale Cooper (born 1963), Scottish football manager
- Nicholas Ashley-Cooper, 12th Earl of Shaftesbury (born 1979), Earl of Shaftesbury

== O ==
- Ollie Cooper (born 1999), English footballer
- Ollie Cooper (born 2000), English professional boxer
- Omar Cooper (born 2003), American football player
- Owen Cooper (boxer) (born 2000), English boxer
- Owen Cooper (actor) (born 2009), English actor

== P ==
- Pat Cooper (1929–2023), American comedian
- Pat Cooper (baseball) (1917–1993), American baseball player
- Patience Cooper (1905–1993), Indian actress
- Paul Cooper (disambiguation), multiple people
- Paulette Cooper (born 1944), American journalist
- Pell Cooper, American judge
- Peter Cooper (disambiguation), multiple people
- Philip Cooper (1885–1950), English cricketer
- Philip H. Cooper (1844–1912), American admiral
- Priscilla Cooper Tyler (1816–1889), de facto First Lady of USA 1842–44

== Q ==
- Quade Cooper (born 1988), Australian rugby union player

== R ==
- R. Clarke Cooper (born 1971), American diplomat
- Ray Cooper (born 1942), English musician
- Revel Cooper (died 1983), Australian artist
- Richard Cooper (disambiguation), multiple people
- Riley Cooper (born 1987), US American Football player
- Risteárd Cooper, Irish comedian
- Robert Cooper (disambiguation), multiple people
- Robert S. Cooper (1932–2007), American engineer and director of NASA and DARPA
- Roger Cooper (politician) (born 1944), Minnesota politician
- Roger Cooper (paleontologist) (1939–2020), New Zealand paleontologist
- Rosa Cooper (1829–1877), English actress in Australia.
- Rosie Cooper (born 1950), British politician
- Roxanne Cooper, British singer
- Roy Cooper (disambiguation), multiple people
- Rusi Cooper (1922–2023), Indian cricketer
- Russell Cooper (disambiguation), multiple people

== S ==
- Samuel Cooper (clergyman) (born 1725)
- Samuel Cooper (disambiguation), multiple people
- Sarah Cooper (disambiguation), multiple people
- Selina Cooper (1864–1946), English suffragist and politician
- Shane Cooper (disambiguation), multiple people
- Shani Cooper, Israeli diplomat
- Sharife Cooper (born 2001), American basketball player
- Shaun Cooper (born 1983), English footballer
- Sherry Cooper, Canadian-American, Chief Economist of BMO Capital Markets
- Sheryl Cooper (born c. 1957), American dancer and stage performer, wife of rock singer Alice Cooper
- (Thomas) Sidney Cooper (1803–1902), English painter
- Simon Cooper (disambiguation), multiple people
- Stoney Cooper (1918–1977), American country musician
- Susan Cooper (disambiguation), multiple people
- Steve Cooper (football manager) (born 1979), Welsh football manager

== T ==
- Tarzan Cooper (1907–1980), American basketball player
- Te'a Cooper (born 1997), American basketball player
- Terence Cooper (1933–1997), Northern Irish actor
- Terry Cooper (disambiguation), multiple people

- Terry Cooper (footballer, born 1944) (1944–2021), with Leeds United
- Terry Cooper (footballer, born 1950), Welsh footballer with Lincoln City

- Theodore Cooper (1839–1919), American engineer
- Thomas Cooper (disambiguation), multiple people, including

- Thomas Cooper (American politician, born 1759) (1759–1840), American educationalist and political philosopher in South Carolina
- Thomas Cooper (Delaware politician) (1764–1829), U.S. congressman from Delaware
- Thomas Cooper (bishop) (c. 1517–1594), English bishop of Lincoln and Winchester
- Thomas Cooper (brewer) (1826–1897), founder of Coopers Brewery
- Thomas Cooper (Parliamentarian) (died 1659), colonel in the Parliamentary Army and politician

- Thomas Cooper (poet) (1805–1892), English poet and Chartist

- Thomas Cooper de Leon (1839–1914), American journalist, author and playwright
- Thomas Apthorpe Cooper (1776–1849), English actor
- Thomas E. Cooper (born 1943), Assistant Secretary, U.S. Air Force
- Thomas Edwin Cooper (1874–1942), English architect
- Thomas Frederick Cooper, Tommy Cooper (1921–1984), British comedian and magician
- Thomas Frederick Cooper (watchmaker) (1789–1863), English watchmaker
- Thomas Haller Cooper (1919–1987), member of the British Free Corps and convicted traitor
- Thomas Joshua Cooper (born 1946), American landscape photographer
- Thomas Buchecker Cooper (1823–1862), U.S. congressman from Pennsylvania
- Thomas Sidney Cooper (1803–1902), English painter
- Thomas Thornville Cooper (1839–1878), English traveller in China
- Thomas Valentine Cooper (1835–1909), American politician from Pennsylvania
- Thomas Cooper, 1st Baron Cooper of Culross (1892–1955), Scottish politician, judge and historian

- Tim Cooper (disambiguation), multiple people
- Tina Cooper (1918–1986), English paediatrician
- TK Cooper, English professional wrestler
- Tom Cooper (baseball) (1927–1985), American Negro league baseball player
- Tom Cooper (cricketer) (born 1986), Netherlands and South Australia cricketer
- Tom Cooper (cyclist) (1874–1906), American racing cyclist and early automobile driver
- Tom Cooper (footballer) (1904–1940), England international footballer
- Tom Cooper (rugby union) (born 1987), English rugby union player
- Tommy Cooper (1921–1984), British magician and comedian

== W ==
- Walker Cooper (1915–1991), American baseball player
- Walter Gaze Cooper (1895–1981), British pianist and composer
- Warren Cooper (born 1933), New Zealand politician
- Whina Cooper (1895–1994), New Zealand Māori leader
- Wilbur Cooper (1892–1973), American baseball player
- W. E. Shewell-Cooper (1900–1982), British organic gardener
- Wilhelmina Cooper (1939–1980), American model
- William Cooper (disambiguation), multiple people
- Wilson Marion Cooper (died 1916), American Sacred Harp teacher
- Wyatt Emory Cooper (1927–1978), American screenwriter
- Wyllis Cooper (1899–1955), American radio writer

== Y ==
- Yvette Cooper (born 1969), British Labour Party politician and 2015 Labour leadership contender

== Fictional characters ==
- Alison Cooper, character from Ghosts 2019 TV series
- Barbara Cooper, character from One Day at a Time (1975 TV series)
- Betty Cooper, character from Archie Comics
- Buzz Cooper, character from the soap opera Guiding Light
- Dale Cooper, character from the TV show Twin Peaks
- Gwen Cooper, character from the Doctor Who spinoff series Torchwood
- Gwendolyn "Winnie" Cooper, character from The Wonder Years TV Series
- Harriet Cooper, character from the 1966 Batman series
- Joseph Cooper, character from the 2014 movie Interstellar
- Kaitlin Cooper, character from the TV series The O.C.
- Lauren Cooper, character in The Catherine Tate Show
- Marina Cooper, character from the soap opera Guiding Light
- Marissa Cooper, character from the TV series The O.C.
- Mark Cooper, character from the TV series Hangin' with Mr. Cooper
- Mike Cooper, character from the 2019 TV series Ghosts
- Miss Cooper, a.k.a. Seki-sensei, a character from the Japanese anime Ojamajo Doremi
- Sheldon Lee Cooper, B.S., M.S., M.A., Ph.D., Sc.D.,, character from the American TV sitcoms The Big Bang Theory and Young Sheldon
- George Cooper Sr., character from the American TV sitcom Young Sheldon
- Mary Tucker-Cooper, character from the American TV sitcoms The Big Bang Theory, Young Sheldon and Georgie & Mandy's First Marriage
- George "Georgie" Marshall Cooper Jr., character from the American TV sitcoms The Big Bang Theory, Young Sheldon and Georgie & Mandy's First Marriage
- Melissa "Missy" Cooper, character from the American TV sitcoms The Big Bang Theory, Young Sheldon and Georgie & Mandy's First Marriage
- Constance "CeeCee" Cooper, character from the American TV sitcoms Young Sheldon and Georgie & Mandy's First Marriage
- Sly Cooper, character from the Sly Cooper video games
- Tamia "Coop" Cooper, a character in the television series All American
- Valerie "Val" Cooper, character from the Marvel Universe
- K.C. Cooper and other members of her family, from K.C. Undercover
- Cooper, a Alien or Creature from the Super 8 (2011 film).

== See also ==
- Cooper (given name)
- Cooper (disambiguation)
- Justice Cooper (disambiguation)
- Couper, a surname
- Cowper (surname)
- Hooper (surname)
- Coopes, a surname
- Coops, a surname
- Coope, a surname
- Coop (surname)
