= Thomas Cooper =

Thomas, Tom, or Tommy Cooper may refer to:

== Arts and entertainment ==
- Thomas Abthorpe Cooper (1776–1849), English actor
- Thomas Sidney Cooper (1803–1902), English painter
- Thomas Cooper (poet) (1805–1892), English poet and Chartist
- Thomas Cooper de Leon (1839–1914), American journalist, author and playwright
- Tommy Cooper (1921–1984), British magician and comedian
- Thomas Joshua Cooper (born 1946), American landscape photographer

== Military ==
- Thomas Haller Cooper (1919–1987), member of the British Free Corps and convicted traitor
- Thomas E. Cooper (born 1943), US Assistant Secretary of the Air Force (Acquisition), 1983–87
- Tom Cooper (military historian) (born 1970), Austrian military aviation historian

== Politics ==
- Thomas Cooper (Parliamentarian) (died 1659), colonel in the Parliamentary Army and politician
- Thomas Cooper (Delaware politician) (1764–1829), US congressman from Delaware
- Thomas Buchecker Cooper (1823–1862), US congressman from Pennsylvania
- Thomas Valentine Cooper (1835–1909), American politician from Pennsylvania
- Thomas Cooper, 1st Baron Cooper of Culross (1892–1955), Scottish politician, judge and historian
- Thomas Butler Cooper, member of the Alabama House of Representatives

== Sports ==
- Tom Cooper (cyclist) (1874–1906), American racing cyclist and early automobile driver
- Tom Cooper (footballer) (1904–1940), England international footballer
- Tom Cooper (baseball) (1927–1985), American Negro league baseball player
- Tom Cooper (cricketer) (born 1986), Netherlands and South Australia cricketer
- Tom Cooper (rugby union) (born 1987), English rugby union player

== Others ==
- Thomas Cooper (academic) (1759–1840), American educationalist and political philosopher from South Carolina
- Thomas Cooper (bishop) (c. 1517–1594), English bishop of Lincoln and Winchester
- Thomas Frederick Cooper (watchmaker) (1789–1863), English watchmaker
- Thomas Cooper (brewer) (1826–1897), founder of Coopers Brewery
- Thomas Thornville Cooper (1839–1878), English traveller in China
- Thomas Cooper, a nineteenth century Leicester shoemaker, inspiration for the protagonist of Charles Kinsley's Alton Locke
- Sir Edwin Cooper (architect) (Thomas Edwin Cooper, 1874–1942), English architect

== Other uses ==
- Tommy Cooper: Not Like That, Like This, 2014 film
