= Thomas Frederick Cooper =

Thomas Frederick Cooper may refer to:

- Tommy Cooper (Thomas Frederick Cooper), comedian and magician
- Thomas Frederick Cooper (watchmaker)

== See also ==
- Thomas Cooper (disambiguation)
