= Bert Cooper (disambiguation) =

Bert Cooper (1966–2019) was a boxer.

Bert or Bertie Cooper may also refer to:

- Bert Cooper (American football) (born 1952), American football player
- Bert Cooper (Mad Men)
- Bertie Cooper, Australian rules footballer

== See also ==
- Albert Cooper (disambiguation)
- Robert Cooper (disambiguation)
- Herbert Cooper, cricketer
