= Michael Hooper =

Michael or Mike Hooper may refer to:

- Michael Hooper (bishop) (born 1941), former Suffragan Bishop of Ludlow
- Michael Hooper (rugby union) (born 1991), Australian rugby union player
- Mike Hooper (footballer) (born 1964), English football goalkeeper
- Mike Hooper (baseball) (1850–1917), American baseball player
- Mike Hooper (cricketer) (1947–2010), English cricketer

== See also ==
- Michael Cooper (disambiguation)
- Mike Cooper (disambiguation)
