= Albert Cooper =

Albert Cooper may refer to:

== Sports ==
- Albert Cooper (cricketer) (1893–1977), English cricketer
- Albert Cooper (soccer) (1904–1993), U.S. soccer player
- Bertie Cooper (1892–1916), Australian rules footballer
- Bert Cooper (born 1966), American heavyweight boxer

== Other ==
- Albert Cooper (British politician) (1910–1986), British politician
- Albert Cooper (Canadian politician) (born 1952), Canadian politician
- Albert Cooper (flute maker) (1924–2011), British flute maker

== See also ==
- Bert Cooper (disambiguation)
