= Leo Cooper =

Leo Cooper may refer to:

- Leo Cooper (publisher) (1934–2013), British publisher
- Leo Cooper (historian) (born 1922), Polish–Australian historian
