= Barry Cooper =

Barry Cooper may refer to:

- Barry Cooper (activist) (born 1969), former US narcotics officer turned anti-drug war activist
- Barry Cooper (author), British author and pastor
- Barry Cooper (cricketer) (born 1958), New Zealand cricketer
- Barry Cooper (geologist) (1948–2023), Australian geologist and historian of geosciences
- Barry Cooper (musicologist) (born 1949), English musicologist and composer
- Barry Cooper (political scientist) (born 1943), Canadian political scientist
- Barry Michael Cooper (died 2025), American writer, producer and director
- S. Barry Cooper (1943–2015), British mathematician

== See also ==
- Cooper (surname)
