= William Chinowsky =

American astrophysicist

- Citizenship: United States
- Education: Columbia University B.A. (1949), and Ph.D. (1955)
- Awards: Guggenheim Fellowship (1966, 1978)
- Scientific career
- Fields: Astrophysics
- Workplaces: University of California, Berkeley; Lawrence Berkeley National Laboratory

William Chinowsky is an American astrophysicist. He is a professor emeritus at the University of California, Berkeley.

== Biography ==
Chinowsky received his A.B. and Ph.D. from Columbia University. He worked as a staff physicist at Brookhaven National Laboratory before joining the Berkeley faculty in 1961. He served as a program director of the National Science Foundation from 1992 to 1996 and was affiliated with the Lawrence Berkeley National Laboratory. He works in observational high-energy neutrino astrophysics. Among his students were Carl Haber, a MacArthur Fellow known for his work in audio preservation, and Susan Cooper, professor at the University of Oxford.

Chinowsky received two Guggenheim Fellowships, one in 1966 for experiments in elementary particle interactions, and a second in 1978. In 1987, he was elected a fellow of the American Physical Society for "contributions to the discovery of numerous elementary particles and the determination of their properties."
