= Simon Cooper =

Simon Cooper may refer to:

- Simon Cooper (banker) (born 1967)
- Simon Cooper (British Army officer) (born 1936)
- Simon Cooper (writer), shortlisted for Wainwright Prize 2017
- Simon Cooper (fictional character), a character from the British comedy The Inbetweeners
