= Samuel Cooper =

Samuel or Sam Cooper may refer to:

- Samuel Cooper (painter) (1609–1672), English miniature painter
- Samuel Cooper (clergyman) (1725–1783), Congregationalist minister in Boston, Massachusetts
- Samuel Cooper (surgeon) (1780–1848), English surgeon and writer of medical books
- Samuel Cooper (general) (1798–1876), U.S. Army officer and senior Confederate general officer
- Samuel Cooper (serial killer) (born 1977), American serial killer
- Samuel B. Cooper (1850–1918), U.S. Representative from Texas
- Samuel Cooper Thacher (1785–1818), American clergyman and librarian
- Samuel Cooper (volleyball) (born 2001), Canadian volleyball player
- Sam Cooper (baseball) (1897–?), American baseball player
- Sam Cooper (American football) (1909–1998), American football player
- Sam Cooper (journalist), Canadian investigative journalist and author

== Other uses ==
- Sam Cooper Boulevard, highway in Memphis, Tennessee
- Sam Cooper (Criminal Minds: Suspect Behavior), fictional character on television series Criminal Minds: Suspect Behavior
- Sam Cooper, fictional character from The Boroughs
