= Susan Cooper (disambiguation) =

Susan Cooper (born 1935) is a British author of children's books.

Susan Cooper is also the name of:

- Susan Cooper (swimmer) (born 1963), British Olympic swimmer
- Susan Cooper (physicist), professor of experimental physics at Oxford University
- Susan Fenimore Cooper (1813–1894), writer
- Susan Rogers Cooper (1947–2024), American mystery novelist

== See also ==
- Susie Cooper, English ceramic designer
