= Havidol =

Satirical advertising campaign

Havidol (avafynetyme HCL) is a parody campaign for a fictional medication to treat a fake psychological disorder called Dysphoric Social Attention Consumption Deficit Anxiety Disorder (DSACDAD). [Pronounced Dee-sack-dad] The name is a play on the phrase: "have it all"; its pseudo-chemical name, "avafynetyme HCL", reads, "Have a fine time".

== History ==
According to the artist, Justine Cooper, the "official HAVIDOL website", havidol.com, had 5,000 hits within a few days of its creation, and some visitors to her gallery have believed HAVIDOL to be a real prescription drug.

HAVIDOL was presented at the 18th Consumers International World Congress on The Ethics of Drug Promotion held in Sydney, Australia October 29 to November 1, 2007.

== Justine Cooper ==
Australian artist Justine Cooper created the marketing campaign as a social satire on the tactics used by the drug industry to sell prescription medications. The pseudo advertising campaign also examines our collective desire and expectation, that there is always room for improvement, and our doubts as to whether we are ever good enough, or have enough. Cooper stated she intended the exhibit to be humorous, but subtle. The campaign recreates the entire drug marketing process. It starts from the invention of a new disorder to the branding process of naming the drug, its pill and logo design, and promotional merchandise. The campaign was on display at the Daneyal Mahmood Art Gallery in New York City from February 8 to March 17, 2007, and included TV, print and billboard ads along with merchandise and branding material.

Cooper had the initial idea while waiting for a flight at the Los Angeles International Airport. She viewed her first direct-to-consumer (DTC) pharmaceutical advertisements, promoting drugs for allergies, insomnia, depression, and erectile dysfunction, while watching the news on TV. DTC advertising is only allowed in the United States and New Zealand. She received funding from the Australia Council for the Arts, the Greenwall Foundation in New York, and the New York State Council on the Arts.

=== Testimonials ===
Testimonials of the drug have revealed patients feeling

- renewed interest in themselves
- increased ability to spend
- higher risk tolerance
- better quality consumer decisions
- improved social attention-getting skills
- return to former self-esteem levels
- supplementary stamina levels
- augmented vision
- a surge in well-being
