= Justine Cooper =

Justine Cooper may refer to:

- Justine Cooper (Angel), a character in the TV series Angel
- Justine Cooper (artist) (born 1968), Australian artist
