= Bryan Cooper =

Bryan Cooper may refer to:

- COOPER (artist) (born 1976), a.k.a. Bryan Cooper, American artist
- Bryan Cooper (politician) (1884–1930), Irish independent/Cumann na nGaedhael politician
- Bryan Cooper (jockey) (born 1992), Irish National Hunt jockey

== See also ==
- Brian Cooper (disambiguation)
