= Justin Cooper =

Justin Cooper may refer to:

- Justin Cooper (Canadian football) (born 1982), Canadian football player
- Justin Cooper (actor) (born 1988), American child actor
- Justin Cooper (aide), senior aide to former United States President Bill Clinton
- Justin D. Cooper, president of Redeemer University College
- Justin Cooper (motorcyclist) (born 1997), American motorcycle racer
