= Cooper (given name) =

- Gender: Male
- Language: English

Origin
- Language: Old English
- Origin: Cooper (surname)
- Meaning: “barrel maker”
- Region of origin: England

Other names
- Short form: Coop
- See also: Cooper (surname)

Cooper is a masculine given name of English origin. Its meaning is "barrel maker".

== People ==
- Cooper Andrews (born 1985), American actor
- Cooper Barkate (born 2003), American football player
- Cooper Becklin (born 2004), American racing driver
- Cooper Beebe (born 2001), American football player
- Cooper Blankenship (1929–2015), American politician
- Cooper Boone (born 1963), American singer-songwriter, psychologist and chef
- Cooper Bowman (born 2000), American baseball player
- Cooper Carlisle (born 1977), American professional football player
- Cooper Coats (born 1996), Australian rugby union and sevens player
- Cooper Connolly (born 2003), Australian cricketer
- Cooper Coyle, one half of the sibling drag duo Sugar and Spice
- Cooper Criswell (born 1996), American baseball player
- Cooper Cronk (born 1983), Australian rugby league player
- Cooper DeJean (born 2003), American football player
- Cooper Edens (born 1945), American author and illustrator of children's books
- Cooper Flagg (born 2006), American basketball player
- Cooper Garnos (born 1965), American politician
- Cooper Green (born 1900s), American politician
- Cooper Harris, American entrepreneur and actress
- Cooper Hodges (born 2000), American football player
- Cooper Hoffman (born 2003), American actor
- Cooper Huckabee (born 1951), American film and television actor
- Cooper Koch (born 1996), American actor
- Cooper Kruah, Liberian politician
- Cooper Kupp (born 1993), American football player
- Cooper Legas (born 2000), American football player
- Cooper Lutkenhaus (born 2008), American middle-distance runner
- Cooper Manning (born 1974), American sports television host
- Cooper Mays (born 2001), American football player
- Cooper McDonald (born 2001), American football player
- Cooper Rawson (1876–1946), British businessman and member of Parliament
- Cooper Sanchez (born 2007), American soccer player
- Cooper Smeaton (1890–1978), Canadian professional ice hockey referee and head coach
- Cooper Snyder, member of the Ohio Senate 1979–1996
- Cooper Vuna (born 1987), New Zealand rugby league player
- Cooper Webster (born 2003), Australian racing driver
- Cooper Wallace (born 1982), American professional football player
- Peter Cooper Hewitt (1861–1921), American electrical engineer and inventor
- T. Cooper Evans (1924–2005), American politician

== Fictional characters ==
- Cooper Anderson, character from the television show Glee
- Cooper Barrett, character from the soap opera General Hospital
- Cooper Bradshaw, character from the soap opera Guiding Light
- Cooper Clayton, in Karen McManus's One of Us Is Lying
- Cooper Coen a.k.a. Web Weaver, a character from Marvel Comics
- Cooper Dillon, character in the film The Hunger Games: The Ballad of Songbirds and Snakes
- Cooper Freedman, character on the Grey's Anatomy spin-off, Private Practice
- Cooper, a supporting character from the Ben 10 franchise
- Cooper, a troll from the 2016, 2020 & 2023 animated films Trolls, Trolls World Tour, and Trolls Band Together
- Cooper Howard, a.k.a. the Ghoul, character from the television show Fallout

== See also ==
- Cooper (disambiguation)
- Cooper (surname)
