= Judge Cooper =

Judge Cooper may refer to:

- Charles Cooper (judge) (1795–1887), Australian politician and the first chief justice of South Australia
- Christopher R. Cooper (born 1966), judge of the United States District Court for the District of Columbia
- Clarence Cooper (judge) (born 1942), judge of the United States District Court for the Northern District of Georgia
- Florence-Marie Cooper (1940–2010), judge of the United States District Court for the Central District of California
- Frank Cooper (judge) (1869–1946), judge of the United States District Court for the Northern District of New York
- Irving Ben Cooper (1902–1996), judge of the United States District Court for the Southern District of New York
- Mary Little Cooper (born 1946), judge of the United States District Court for the District of New Jersey
- Robert Archer Cooper (1874–1953), judge of the United States District Court for the District of Puerto Rico
- Samuel B. Cooper (1850–1918), American politician and member of the Board of General Appraisers

== See also ==
- Justice Cooper (disambiguation)
