= Hkamti Long =

Former Shan state in Burma

Coordinates: 27°19′N 97°25′E

- State of the Shan States
- ?–20th century
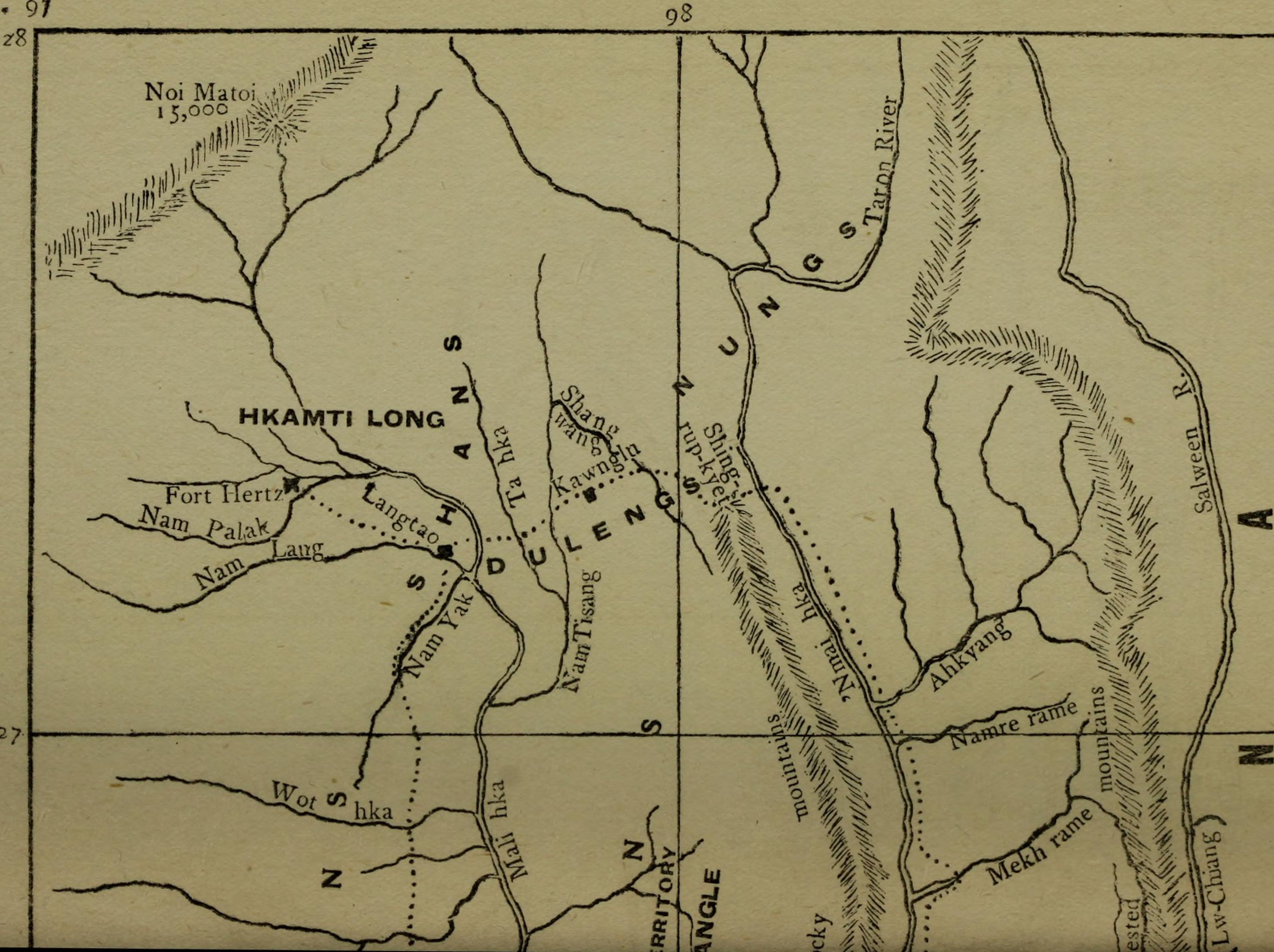
- Hkamti Long in a map from In farthest Burma - the record of an arduous journey of exploration and research through the unknown frontier territory of Burma and Tibet (1921)
- Area
  - (estimate): 2,330 km^{2} (900 sq mi)
- Population
  - (estimate): 11,000
- History
  - Established: ?
  - Abdication of the last Saopha: 20th century
Succeeded by
British Burma

Hkamti Long (Burmese: ခန္တီးကြီး; Chinese: 坎底), also known as Khamti Long or Khandigyi, was a Shan state in what is today Burma. It was an outlying territory, located by the Mali River, north of Myitkyina District, away from the main Shan State area in present-day Kachin State. The main town was Putao.

== History ==
Hkamti Long began as an outlying territory of Möng Kawng and was settled by the Hkamti, a sub-group of the Shan people. The name means "Great Place of Gold" in the Hkamti language.

It was made up of seven small principalities: Lokhun, Mansi, Lon Kyein, Manse-Hkun, Mannu, Langdao, Mong Yak and Langnu which were under the Hkamti Long was beyond the borders of the British Mandalay Division and was never brought under direct British rule, after the Shan states submitted to British rule after the fall of the Konbaung dynasty.

Hkamti Long was visited by traveller Thomas Thornville Cooper, British Agent at Bhamo, where he was murdered in 1878; later also by colonels Macgregor and Woodthorpe in 1884-1885, by Errol Gray in 1892-1893, and by Prince Henry of Orleans in 1893.

Towards the end of the 19th century the inhabitants were still mostly Shan, but they ended up being absorbed or expelled by the Kachin people and other dominant ethnic groups of the region.

=== Rulers ===
The rulers of Hkamti Long bore the title of Saopha.

==== Saophas ====
- c.1860 - c.1862 ...
- c.1862 - 1910 San Nwe Cho (b. 1837 - d. 1910)
- 1910 - 1915 San Nwe No (b. 1855 - d. 1915)
- 13 Aug 1915 - 19.. Sao Hpa Hkan (b. c.1854 - d. 19..)
