= Ian Cooper =

Ian Cooper may refer to:

- Ian Cooper (Australian footballer, born 1946) (1946–2021), former Australian rules football player
- Ian Cooper (Australian footballer, born 1954), former Australian rules footballer
- Ian Cooper (English footballer) (born 1946), former English football (soccer) player
- Ian Cooper (ice hockey) (born 1968), British ice hockey player
- Ian Cooper (violinist) (born 1970), Australian musician
- Ian Cooper (boxer), ABA Middleweight Champion
- Ian Cooper (artist) (born 1978), American visual artist, film producer, and academic
