= Mike Cooper =

Mike Cooper may refer to:

- Mike Cooper (musician) (born 1942), English blues and jazz guitarist and singer-songwriter
- Mike Cooper (politician) (born 1951), former politician in Ontario, Canada

== See also ==
- Michael Cooper (disambiguation)
- Mike Hooper (disambiguation)
