= Nancy Cooper =

News executive and editor in chief of Newsweek

Nancy Cooper is an American journalist and news executive and was the global editor-in-chief of Newsweek magazine, a position she held from 2018 to March 2025.

Prior to joining Newsweek, she was deputy executive producer on The Takeaway, a public radio show produced by WNYC, and also worked at International Business Times from 2014 to 2018.

== Newsweek ==
In 2020 an email Cooper sent to her staff was appeared in a Columbia Journalism Review article, with the subject line "What is a Newsweek story?" The email outlined four requirements for stories published on original reporting, a unique angle or new information, relevance to readers, and timeliness. However, the article suggested that Newsweek reporters were not given sufficient time to meet these requirements, as they were expected to write four stories per day with a focus on generating clicks.

In a response, Cooper disagreed with the general conclusions of the article.

In 2022, Cooper commented on in response to Axios article about the ownership issues and lawsuits facing Newsweek, stating that the legal matters did not involve her. The lawsuits are part of a series of ethics issues that have affected the company, including the firing of journalists who attempted to cover investigations into the company in 2018, the purchase of fraudulent traffic to boost ad sales, and the incentivization of reporters to write clickbait stories for traffic gains.

Under Cooper's leadership, Newsweek launched a fairness meter on news articles in October 2023. In the first two years of the meter, nearly 4 million votes were cast on articles, with 70% of readers voting Newsweek articles fair.

In March 2024, Cooper led interviews with heads of state, including Prime Minister Narendra Modi of India and Prime Minister Fumio Kishida of Japan.
