= Kevin Cooper =

Kevin Cooper may refer to:

- Kevin Cooper (prisoner) (born 1958), inmate on death row in California
- Kevin Cooper (footballer) (born 1975), English footballer
- Kevin Cooper (cricketer) (born 1957), English first class cricketer
- Kevin Cooper (lacrosse) (born 1991), American lacrosse player

== See also ==
- Kevon Cooper (born 1989), cricketer from Trinidad and Tobago
