= Shane Cooper =

Shane Cooper is the name of:

- Shane Cooper (artist), German installation artist
- Shane Cooper (rugby league) (born 1960), New Zealand rugby league footballer
