= Cynthia Cooper =

Cynthia Cooper may refer to:

- Cynthia Cooper-Dyke (born 1963), née Cynthia Cooper, basketball player
- Cynthia Cooper (accountant), whistleblower who exposed fraud at Worldcom
