= Craig Cooper =

Craig Cooper may refer to:

- Craig B. Cooper (born 1949), American aquanaut
- Craig Cooper (badminton) (born 1981), badminton player from New Zealand
- Craig Cooper (baseball), player for 1986 College Baseball All-America Team
- Craig Cooper from K.C. Undercover
