= Richard Cooper =

Richard Cooper may refer to:

== Sportspeople ==
- Richard Cooper (American football) (born 1964), American NFL player
- Richard Cooper (cricketer, born 1945) (1945–1990), English cricketer
- Richard Cooper (cricketer, born 1972), English cricketer
- Richard Cooper (footballer, born 1965), English footballer
- Richard Cooper (footballer, born 1979), English football coach and footballer

== Politicians ==
- Sir Richard Cooper, 2nd Baronet (1874–1946), British Conservative politician
- Richard Clive Cooper (1881–1940), Irish-Canadian soldier and Unionist politician
- Richard M. Cooper (1768–1843), Representative from New Jersey

== Artists and actors ==
- Richard Cooper, the elder (1701–1764), English engraver
- Richard Cooper Jr. (1740–1822), British artist
- Richard Cooper (actor) (1893–1947), British actor
- Dick Cooper, musician and writer

== Others ==
- Sir Richard Cooper, 1st Baronet (1847–1913), British industrial entrepreneur
- Richard Cooper (academic) (born 1947), British academic
- Richard Cooper (journalist) (born 1946), American journalist
- Richard Cooper (judge) (1947–2005), Federal Court of Australia judge
- Richard N. Cooper (1934–2020), economist and policy adviser
- Richard S. Cooper (born 1945), American cardiologist and epidemiologist

== See also ==
- Richard Couper, English politician
