= Martin Cooper =

Martin or Marty Cooper may refer to:

- Martin Cooper (musicologist) (1910–1986), English music critic and author
- Martin Cooper (inventor) (born 1928), designer of the first mobile phone
- Marty Cooper (musician) (born 1942), American musician
- Martin Cooper (rugby union) (born 1948), England international rugby union player
- Martin Cooper (musician) (born 1958), British painter and a musician
- Martin Cooper (born 1974), American drag queen performing under Coco Montrese
