= George Cooper =

George Cooper may refer to:

== Politicians ==
- George Cooper (Poole MP) (1626–1689), English politician
- George Cooper (Canadian politician) (born 1941), Canadian Member of Parliament for Halifax, 1979–1980
- George Cooper (Bermondsey MP) (1844–1909), Member of Parliament for Bermondsey, 1906–1909
- George B. Cooper (politician) (1808–1866), U.S. Representative from Michigan
- George W. Cooper (1851–1899), U.S. Representative from Indiana
- George Cooper (public servant) (1793–1867), first Colonial Treasurer of New Zealand

== Sports ==
- George Cooper (linebacker) (born 1958), American football player
- George Cooper (tight end) (born 1984), American football player
- George Cooper (cricketer) (1907–2000), Australian cricketer
- George Cooper (umpire) (1907–1980), Australian cricket Test match umpire
- George E. Cooper, head coach of American college football teams in the 1920s
- George Cooper (footballer, born 1932) (1932–1994), English footballer for Crystal Palace and Rochdale
- George Cooper (footballer, born 1996), English footballer for Plymouth Argyle
- George Cooper (footballer, born 2002), English footballer for Mansfield Town

== Military ==
- Sir George Cooper (British Army officer) (1925–2020), Adjutant-General to the Forces in the United Kingdom
- George Franklin Cooper, United States Navy officer
- George H. Cooper (1821–1891), United States Navy rear admiral

== Fictional characters ==
- George Cooper Sr., character from The Big Bang Theory franchise, Sheldon Cooper's father
- George Cooper Jr., character from The Big Bang Theory franchise, Sheldon Cooper's brother
- George Cooper (Tortallan character), character from The Song of the Lioness novel series by Tamora Pierce

== Others ==
- George Cooper (actor) (1892–1943), American actor of the silent era
- George Cooper (organist) (1820–1876), English organist
- George Cooper (poet) (1840–1927), American poet and lyricist
- George A. Cooper (1925–2018), British actor
- George A. Cooper (director) (1894–1947), British screenwriter and film director
- George B. Cooper (historian) (1916–1995), American historian of British history
- George S. Cooper (1864–1929), American architect
- Buster Cooper (George Cooper, 1929–2016), American jazz trombonist
- Felix Morrow (1906–1988), American political activist and publisher, who used "George Cooper" as a pseudonym in the early 1930s
