= Matthew Cooper =

Matthew or Matt Cooper may refer to:

- Matt Cooper, keyboardist of the British acid jazz band Incognito
- Matt Cooper (Irish journalist) (born 1966), Irish journalist, broadcaster, author and former editor of the Sunday Tribune
- Matt Cooper (rugby league) (born 1979), Australian rugby league footballer
- Matthew Cooper, American ambient recording artist better known as Eluvium
- Matthew Cooper (American journalist) (born 1963), American journalist; associated with the leaking of CIA officer Valerie Plame's name
- Matthew Cooper (footballer) (born 1994), Scottish footballer
- Matthew Cooper (rower) (1948–2015), British Olympic rower
- Matthew Cooper (rugby union) (born 1966), New Zealand rugby union footballer
- Matthew T. Cooper (born 1934), United States Marine Corps general

== Characters ==
- Matthew Cooper, a fictional character from the video game ArmA II (2009)
- Matthew Cooper, a fictional character from the television series Dr. Quinn, Medicine Woman (1993–1998)
