= Albert Cooper (cricketer) =

English cricketer

Albert Cooper (3 December 1893 – 3 May 1977) was an English cricketer. He was a right-handed batsman and a right-arm slow bowler. He was born and died in Stoke Newington.

Cooper made a single first-class appearance for Essex during the 1923 season. In the game, against the touring West Indians, he scored twelve runs in the first innings and two runs in the second, in a game which Essex lost by three wickets.
