= Charlotte Cooper =

Charlotte Cooper may refer to:

- Charlotte Cooper (tennis) (1870–1966), British tennis player
- Charlotte Cooper (author) (born 1968), British author and LGBT activist
- Charlotte Cooper (born 1986), British musician in The Subways
