= Justin D. Cooper =

Dr Justin D. Cooper

Justin Dean Cooper was the president of Redeemer University College from 1994 to 2009. He has published a number of different scholarly articles, as well as held positions on numerous academic boards. He has a B.A. and an M.A. and Ph.D. in political science.

== Biography ==
Justin D. Cooper is currently in his third term as President of Redeemer University College in Ancaster, Ontario. He has been working with Redeemer since 1980 in a variety of different functions. He served as a faculty member in Political Science and, from 1986 to 1994, as vice-president (academic), in addition to his time as president. He was first appointed to the position of President in 1994, and will be retiring from office in June 2010. During Cooper's time as President, Redeemer has grown to a respected institution of over 900 students. In fact, the school year of 2009/2010 had a record number of first year students for Redeemer. Cooper also saw Redeemer gain provincial recognition as an undergraduate university, as well as the adding of various programs including an accredited faculty of education, and a new international studies minor. Redeemer also expanded its facilities through a combination of provincial, and local funding, as well as donations. These expansions included additional residences, a library/classroom wing and a recently announced soccer complex.

Cooper received his M.A. and Ph.D. in political science from the University of Toronto and his B.A. from Trinity Christian College in Chicago. Cooper is an author and speaker, with articles in both scholarly and popular publications; in recent years his main focus has been academic leadership and community service, particularly working with Redeemer. Locally, he served as part of Hamilton's Community Team for the 2010 Commonwealth Games Bid and in 2008 he completed a term of four years on the Board of the Hamilton Chamber of Commerce as a postsecondary education representative, and has also served on the Chamber’s Executive Committee, Nominating Committee and Government Affairs Committee. He continues to hold a membership in the Jobs Prosperity Collaborative, formerly known as the Hamilton Civic Coalition, and is involved in its Innovation and Learning Group. In June he was appointed to a position on the board of the Hamilton Community Foundation and has also been recently chosen as one of six Hamilton citizens who were inducted into the Gallery of Distinction for 2009.

In the academic field, Cooper completed two terms as board member of the Council for Christian Colleges & Universities in 2009, an organization of over 100 Christian liberal arts institutions that is based in Washington, DC. He also spent time as the chair of the Council of Christian Higher Education Canada (CHEC), an organization of 35 member institutions founded in 2001. In May 2009, he was appointed as the next executive director (third-time) of CHEC, effective July 2010 and has also been appointed as the part-time executive director of the Association of Reformed Institutions of Higher Education, a 10-member association that Redeemer is a member of. He has also spent time on institutional visiting committees for the Association of Universities and Colleges of Canada and for Ontario’s Post-Secondary Education Quality Assessment Board.

He and his wife, Jessie, live in Dundas, have two married sons and seven grandchildren and attend the First Christian Reformed Church.

== Works ==
- Thesis notes: Functionalism revisited, by Justin D Cooper 8 1 September 1985 9-10
- Justin Cooper:A Secularist Appreciation of Religion?"The Clash of Civilizations: Samuel Huntington a Prophet?" Published in Public Justice Report, The Center for Public Justice, September–October 1993
- Justin Cooper:The Means and Ends of Intervention, Published in Public Justice Report, The Center for Public Justice, Third Quarter 1999

== External sources ==
- Redeemer President's Office Webpage
- President Justin Cooper to be inducted into Hamilton Gallery of Distinction
- Gallery of Distinction Honours 6
- Cast of Characters
- My Hamilton People-Justin Cooper
