= Sarah Cooper (disambiguation) =

Sarah Cooper (born 1977) is an American comedian, author, and video maker.

Sarah Cooper may also refer to:

- Sarah Brown Ingersoll Cooper (1835–1896), American philanthropist and educator
- Sarah Cooper (marmalade maker) (1848–1932), English marmalade maker
- Sarah Cooper (sport shooter) (born 1949), English sport shooter
- Sarah Cooper (soccer) (born 1969), Australian footballer
- Sarah Paxon Moore Cooper (1824–1908), American botanist and botanical collector
- Sarah Cooper-Lesadd (born 1994 or 1995), Welsh politician

== See also ==
- Sara Cooper, American playwright and lyricist
