= Justine Cooper (artist) =

Australian artist (born 1968)

- Born: 1968 (age 57–58); Sydney, Australia
- Occupation: Visual artist

Justine Cooper (born 1968 in Sydney, Australia) is an Australian artist and currently residing in New York. Cooper is known for her paintings and photographs which explore themes of identity, history and memory.

== Life and career ==
Cooper is an interdisciplinary artist investigating the intersections between culture, science, and medicine. Cooper uses various media to create her artworks, including animation, video, and photography, and she frequently incorporates medical imaging technologies, including MRI, ultrasound, DNA sequencing, and scanning electron microscopy into her works.

Cooper's work has been exhibited at The New Museum of Contemporary Art, New York; the Singapore Art Museum, the Netherlands Media Art Institute and at the NTT InterCommunication Center, Tokyo, the Royal Institution of Australia in Adelaide, and in the exhibition WetLab: The New Nexus Between Art and Science in 2005.

Cooper’s artwork is represented in the Metropolitan Museum of Art, The Powerhouse Museum (Sydney), The Queensland Art Gallery and the Australian Center for the Moving Image, amongst other public and private collections.

Her 1998 work "Trap - self portrait" uses Magnetic Resonance Imaging (MRI) scans of the artist's own brain.

== Works ==
- Trap - self portrait (1998)
- Moist (2002)
- Havidol (2007)
