= Curtis Cooper =

Curtis Cooper may refer to:

- Curtis Cooper (activist) (1932–2000), in Savannah, Georgia
- Curtis Cooper (mathematician), professor at the University of Central Missouri's Department of Mathematics and Computer Science
- Curtis Cooper (Casualty), a character from British soap opera Casualty
