= Susan Cooper (physicist) =

Professor of Experimental Physics

Susan C. Cooper was professor of experimental physics at Oxford University from 1995 to 2015, and a professorial fellow of St Catherine's College, Oxford.

== Education ==
Cooper was originally a theatre major. Cooper received her undergraduate degree from Colby College in 1971. She received her PhD from Lawrence Berkeley National Laboratory in 1980, where her doctoral advisor was William Chinowsky and her thesis was titled Jets in e^{+}e^{−} Annihilation. In her thesis, Cooper studied the properties of jets created by electron-positron annihilation using data collected by the Mark I detector at SLAC National Accelerator Laboratory's SPEAR collider.

== Career ==
Cooper held postdoctoral positions at DESY from 1980 to 1982 and SLAC National Accelerator Laboratory from 1982 to 1986, including spokesman of Crystal Ball experiment. She was on the faculty at the Massachusetts Institute of Technology from 1986 to 1989, starting in near-IR astronomy to look for brown dwarfs as dark matter and was on the staff of the Max Planck Institute in Munich from 1989 to 1996, including founder and spokesman of the CRESST experiment to search for WIMP dark matter. In the 1990s, Cooper was a leader of the CRESST (Cryogenic Rare Event Search with Superconducting Thermometers) experiment based at the Gran Sasso National Laboratory, which is an experiment seeking to detect dark matter. Cooper was deputy head of particle physics from 2004 to 2015 and associate chairman of physics at Oxford from 2004 to 2014. She served as a member of the university's governing council from 2005 to 2012. She said that she had multiple inspirations in 19th century German mathematician David Hilbert, also she released a book: "A review of Two Photons Physics".
