= Joshua Cooper =

Josh(ua) Cooper may refer to:

== Politicians ==
- Joshua Cooper (died 1757) (c. 1696–1757), Irish landowner and politician, MP for County Sligo 1719–57
- Joshua Cooper (1732–1800), Irish landowner and politician, MP for Castlebar 1761–68, for County Sligo 1768–83
- Joshua Edward Cooper (c. 1761–1837), Irish landowner and politician, MP for County Sligo 1790–1806
- Josh Cooper, Canadian political candidate (Ontario), see Conservative Party of Canada candidates, 2004 Canadian federal election

== Others ==
- Josh Cooper (cryptographer) (1901–1981), British cryptographer
- Josh Cooper (defensive end) (born 1980), American football defensive end
- Josh Cooper (wide receiver) (born 1989), American football wide receiver
