= Nathan Cooper =

Nathan Cooper may refer to:

- Nathan Cooper (Canadian politician) (born 1980), member of the Legislative Assembly of Alberta
- Nathan Cooper (Missouri politician), member of the Missouri House of Representatives
- Nathan A. Cooper (1802–1879), U.S. Army general from New Jersey
