= Brian Cooper =

Brian Cooper may refer to:

- Brian Cooper (baseball) (born 1974), American baseball pitcher
- Brian Cooper (rugby league) (1931–2022), English rugby league player
- Brian Cooper (sprinter) (born 1965), American sprinter and long jumper
- Brian Cooper (ice hockey) (born 1993), American ice hockey player

== See also ==
- Bryan Cooper (disambiguation)
