= Barry Cooper (activist) =

American activist

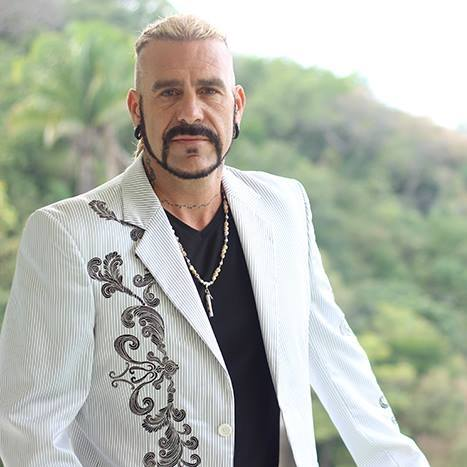
- Cooper in 2015
- Born: May 21, 1969 (age 57)
- Citizenship: U.S.
- Spouse: Mia Madrid Cooper

YouTube information
- Channel: BarryCooperNeverGetBusted
- Website: www.nevergetbusted.com

Barry Cooper (born May 21, 1969) is an American drug reform activist, YouTuber and filmmaker. Formerly a police officer in Texas, Cooper is best known for KopBusters, a series of online videos in which he attempts to document police misconduct, and Never Get Busted Again, a series of videos aimed at teaching citizens how to evade arrest by the police. Cooper also has a popular YouTube channel, "Never Get Busted", in which he offers advice on avoiding drug-related legal issues, drawing on his experiences in law enforcement to educate viewers about their rights and the intricacies of drug laws. In January 2025, the first two episodes of Never Get Busted!, a five-part docuseries chronicling Cooper’s career and activism, premiered at the Sundance Film Festival.

== Early life and career ==
Born May 21, 1969, Cooper was raised in California until 1979, when his family moved to Texas.

Cooper began his law enforcement career with the Gladewater Police Department as a police dispatcher. He was later hired by the Big Sandy Police Department as an interdiction officer in East Texas and trained his own narcotic detection dog. While working in law enforcement, he confiscated large amounts of narcotics and money. Cooper's former superior officer, Tom Finley, described Cooper as "probably the best narcotics officer in the state and maybe the country during his time with the task force." Finley was the Commander of a defunct West Texas drug task force, called the Permian Basin Drug Task Force. Finley and the PBDTF became embroiled in scandal after a former task force officer issued a sworn affidavit claiming that other officers had engaged in illegal activities. Richard Dickson filed the affidavit and forwarded it to the Office of then-governor, George Bush. In the affidavit, Dickson said that members of the Task Force (including Finley) forged payroll documents, and food receipts, and claimed that at least one officer pocketed money meant for a Confidential Informant.

Cooper reports noticing that people arrested for possession of marijuana were nonviolent and cooperative, in contrast to people intoxicated on alcohol who "... would fight and scream and act crazy." He also noted being deeply affected by the emotional trauma he witnessed while participating in home narcotics raids with other officers attired in raid gear and "more guns than we would ever need." Cooper also stated, "We're sending the kids to the Department of Human Services, we're sending the parents to jail over marijuana. Well, I knew some of these people and I knew they weren't gangsters. I knew they were nonviolent people." As a result of this allegation, Ector County District Attorney John Smith requested a Texas Ranger investigation, and a later grand jury investigation. Despite finding untagged evidence, missing narcotics and money, and banking irregularities the grand jury failed to reach an indictment. Governor Bush defunded the task force and terminated all of its members. He went on to fund a Texas Department of Public Safety-controlled task force to take over the PBDTF.

Cooper left law enforcement after his department was sued in a federal civil rights case due to his alleged misconduct.

== Activism ==
Cooper struck on the idea of using an internet-distributed reality TV format program called "KopBusters" that would muckrake abuses of drug enforcement organizations. In a typical KopBusters sting operation, Cooper and his associates would place fake drug evidence and cash and call the police to report the "suspicious" materials. Then they would video record the police activity to see if the officers took the cash and destroyed the other evidence, the latter being a felony offense, according to his lawyer. Cooper set up a sting with no real evidence to trick Odessa, Texas police into raiding a fake marijuana hothouse and published the video of the event publicly via KopBusters.

Local news outlets and print media documented the events of the sting. The Odessa American revealed details and an opinion by a reputable defense attorney days after the incident. According to the article (and other outlets), Raymond Madden hired Barry Cooper to help him with what he believed was a wrongful conviction by the Odessa Police Department against his daughter, Yolanda (detailed below). Cooper and his associates secured the help of an attorney, rented a house in Odessa, and bought cameras and live-streaming equipment. Cooper drafted an anonymous letter purporting to be "penned by the ex-girlfriend" of an Ohio marijuana trafficker. The letter detailed specific information regarding the house and a car driven by the fake drug dealer. The letter specified that there was to be an "80 plant" grow operation at the house and that the fake trafficker was about to harvest the crop for sale. According to the affidavit, the officers conducted surveillance on the residence and corroborated the details of the letter, including a gray car without a license plate and foil on the windows. District Judge Bill McCoy reviewed the warrant and found sufficient probable cause. The officers executed the warrant and found it to be a ruse. The defense attorney interviewed by the Odessa American said that the probable cause was weak but probably admissible. Cooper approached the officers during the raid with cameras and news reporters in tow. He posted his videos on YouTube.

The sting operation also helped to free Yolanda Madden, a mother of two sentenced to 8 years in prison for drug possession, which she alleged was planted by a police informant. Federal Judge Robert Junnell of the Western District of Texas vacated Madden's original sentence in December 2009. In July 2010, Junnell accepted Madden's plea of guilty to her original charge of Possession of Methamphetamine and sentenced her to time served and 3 years of supervised release.

These activities quickly drew the ire of Williamson County police, who raided his home on March 3, 2010, and charged him with two counts of misdemeanor making a false report to a police officer. Other consequences included several arrests, Child Protective Services investigations of Cooper's custody of his son, and a visit by the Texas Rangers, over the Odessa charge, which was later dropped. Due to concerns about further harassment and threats, Cooper fled the U.S. with his family to Brazil in 2013, and later the Philippines. Cooper remains active in the anti-drug-war movement via his website, which provides advice, video materials, and expert witness services to recreational drug users.

== Never Get Busted! Docuseries ==
In 2025, the first two episodes of Never Get Busted!, a five-part docuseries chronicling Cooper’s transformation from a decorated Texas Narcotics officer to an anti-drug-war activist, premiered at the Sundance Film Festival as part of the Episodic Pilot Showcase.

The series, directed by David Anthony Ngo and Stephen McCallum, was written by David Ngo and Erin Williams-Weir, and produced by Projector Films in collaboration with Ventureland and Library Films. The docuseries explores Cooper’s career in law enforcement, his decision to turn against the Drug War, and his activism in exposing police corruption and wrongful arrests.

In an interview with the Sundance Institute, showrunners Ngo and Williams-Weir described the project as an effort to shed light on police misconduct, wrongful arrests, and the flaws in the US government's war on drugs.

The official release platform for the full series has yet to be announced.

== Political career ==
Cooper ran as a Libertarian in the 2010 Texas Attorney General Race on a "pro-pot, pro-gun, pro-family platform." He later dropped out of the race after being repeatedly arrested. He had previously run as a Libertarian candidate for U.S. House of Representatives in Texas in 2008. He garnered 3% of the vote in that race.

== See also ==
- Arguments for and against drug prohibition
- Law Enforcement Against Prohibition
