= Andrew Cooper =

Andrew or Andy Cooper may refer to:

== Arts and entertainment ==
- Sam J. Jones (born 1954), American actor who also modelled under the pseudonym Andrew Cooper III
- Andrew Cooper (actor) (born 1981), British actor and model

== Politics ==
- Andrew F. Cooper (born 1950), Canadian political scientist
- Andrew Cooper, Baron Cooper of Windrush (born 1963), British Conservative politician
- Andrew Cooper (Labour politician) (born 1984), British MP for Mid Cheshire (since 2024)

== Sport ==
- Andy Cooper (1898–1941), American baseball player
- Andrew Cooper (rower) (born 1964), Australian Olympic rower

== Others ==
- Andrew W. Cooper (1927–2002), American civil rights activist and journalist
- Andy Cooper (chemist), British chemist
- Andrew Cooper, Australian businessman and conservative lobbyist, co-founder of CPAC Australia
- Andrew Cooper (The Inbetweeners), fictional character in the British sitcom The Inbetweeners
