= Paul Cooper =

Paul Cooper may refer to:

- Paul Cooper (footballer, born 1953), English football goalkeeper for Birmingham, Ipswich, Leicester, Manchester City and Stockport
- Paul Cooper (footballer, born 1957), English football defender for Huddersfield Town, Grimsby Town and Nuneaton Borough
- Paul Cooper (footballer, born 1975), English football midfielder for Darlington
- Paul Cooper (Australian footballer) (born 1968), Australian rules footballer
- Paul Cooper (sailor) (1928–2022), Hong Kong sailor
- Paul Cooper (speedway rider) (born 1982), English professional speedway rider
- Paul Fenimore Cooper (1899–1970), American traveler and author of children's books and non-fiction
- Paul Cooper (composer) (1926–1996), American composer
- Paul Shipton (born 1963), British children's author who used pseudonym Paul Cooper
- Paul Cooper (basketball) (born 1990), American basketball player
- Paul Cooper (academic), American zoologist and editor in chief of the Australian Journal of Zoology
- Paul Cooper (mechanical engineer), American mechanical engineer

== See also ==
- Paul Lovatt-Cooper (born 1976), English percussionist and composer
