= Jeffrey Cooper =

Jeffrey, Geoffrey, Geoff or Jeff Cooper may refer to:

== Film ==
- Jeff Cooper (actor) (c. 1936–2018), Canadian television and film performer
- Jeffrey Cooper (born 1968), American film editor on 2002's Book of Love

== Military ==
- Jeff Cooper (1920–2006), American Marine officer and handgun expert
- Geoffrey Cooper (RAF officer) (1925–2014), British fighter pilot

== Politicians ==
- Geoffrey Cooper (politician) (1907–1995), English Labour MP for Middlesbrough West
- Jeffrey Cooper, American Democratic candidate (United States House of Representatives elections, 2000)

== Writers ==
- Geoffrey M. Cooper, American biologist, academic and writer since 1970s
- Geoff Cooper, American co-author of 2001's 4 x 4 at Delirium Books

== Fictional characters ==
- Jeffrey Cooper in 1982's National Lampoon's Movie Madness
