= Julie Cooper =

Julie Cooper also refer to:

- Julie Cooper (politician) (born 1960), British Labour Party Member of Parliament
- Julie Cooper (EastEnders), character from the British soap EastEnders
- Julie Cooper (Home and Away), character from the Australian soap Home and Away
- Julie Cooper (The O.C.), character from the U.S. TV series The O.C.

== See also ==
- Julia Cooper Mack (1920–2014), American judge
