= Gary Cooper (disambiguation) =

Gary Cooper (1901–1961) was an American film actor.

Gary Cooper may also refer to:

- J. Gary Cooper (1936–2024), American soldier, politician, and diplomat
- Gary Cooper (rugby league) (1938–2019), English rugby league footballer who played in the 1950s, 1960s and 1970s, and coached in the 1970s
- Gary Cooper (footballer, born 1955), English footballer
- Gary Cooper (outfielder) (born 1956), MLB outfielder for the Atlanta Braves in 1980
- Gary Cooper (boxer) (born 1957), British boxer
- Gary Cooper (third baseman) (born 1964), MLB third baseman for the Houston Astros in 1991
- Gary Cooper (footballer, born 1965), English footballer
- Gary Cooper (musician) (born 1968), English classical musician and conductor
- Gary Cooper (died 1991), ex-ex-gay cleric, see Exodus International#Michael Bussee and Gary Cooper

== See also ==
- Garry Cooper, English actor
- Garry Cooper (pilot), Australian pilot
- Garry Cooper Jr., American entrepreneur
- Garrie Cooper, Australian motorsport designer, builder and racer
