= Ben Cooper (disambiguation) =

Ben Cooper (1933–2020) was an American film and television actor.

Ben Cooper may also refer to:

- Ben Cooper (media executive), British radio journalist, presenter and Controller of BBC Radio 1
- Ben Cooper (musician) (born 1982), singer/songwriter from Jacksonville, Florida
- Ben Cooper (rugby league), rugby league footballer of the 1990s, and 2000s
- Ben Cooper (cricketer) (born 1992), Dutch cricketer
- Ben Cooper (politician) (1854–1920), British politician and trade unionist
- Ben Cooper (company), a corporation which manufactured Halloween costumes

== See also ==
- Benjamin Cooper, member of parliament for Great Yarmouth 1621–24
- Irving Ben Cooper (1902–1996), American judge
