= Terry Cooper =

Terry Cooper may refer to:

- Terry Cooper (footballer, 1944–2021), English international footballer (Leeds United)
- Terry Cooper (footballer, born 1950), Welsh footballer (Lincoln City)
- Terence Cooper (1933–1997), Northern Irish actor
