= Frank Cooper =

Frank or Francis Cooper may refer to:

- Frank Cowper (Francis Cooper, 1849–1930), British yachtsman, author and illustrator
- Frank B. Cooper (1855–1930), American education administrator, superintendent of Seattle Public Schools, 1901–1922
- Francis Alfred Cooper (1860–1933), British civil engineer and colonial administrator
- Frank Irving Cooper (1867–1933), American architect
- Frank Cooper (judge) (1869–1946), U.S. federal judge
- Frank Arthur Cooper (1872–1949), premier of Queensland, 1942–1946
- Frank Cooper (footballer) (1875-1947), English footballer, see List of Bury F.C. players (1–24 appearances)
- Gary Cooper (Frank James Cooper, 1901–1961), American actor
- Franklin S. Cooper (1908–1999), American physicist, inventor, and speech researcher
- Frank Cooper (civil servant) (1922–2002), British civil servant
- Frank Cooper (musicologist) (born 1938), American professor of musicology
- Francis Cooper, pseudonym used by Ken Laszlo (born 1954), Italian singer, songwriter and musician
- Frank Cooper III (born 1960s), business executive and chief marketing officer for PepsiCo, Inc.
- Frank Cooper's, a British jam manufacturer founded in Oxford, England
- Frank Cooper Jr., fictional character from the American TV program Guiding Light

== See also ==
- Frank B. Cooper School, elementary school in Seattle, Washington
