= Colin Cooper (disambiguation) =

Colin Cooper (born 1967) is an English footballer.

Colin Cooper may also refer to:

- Colin Campbell Cooper (1856–1937), American Impressionist painter
- Colin Cooper (rugby union) (born 1959), New Zealand rugby union coach
- Colin Cooper (cancer researcher), professor of cancer genetics at the University of East Anglia
- Colin Cooper (psychologist), British psychologist
