= Alfred Cooper (disambiguation) =

Alfred Cooper (1838–1908) was an English surgeon and clubman.

Alfred or Alf Cooper may also refer to:

- Alfred Cooper (priest) (died 1920), archdeacon of Calgary
- Alfred Heaton Cooper (1864–1929), Victorian artist
- Alfred Edward Cooper (1869–1960), South African cricketer
- Alfred Egerton Cooper (1883–1974), British painter
- Alfred Cooper (cricketer) (1893–1963), South African Test cricketer
- Alfred Cooper (baseball) (1899–1966), American Negro leagues baseball player
- Alf Cooper (1932–2023), Irish cricketer and doctor, later emigrated to the United States
- Alfred Cooper (bishop) (born 1950), British-Chilean Anglican bishop
- Alf Cooper (footballer), English footballer; see list of Sheffield Wednesday F.C. players
