= Douglas Cooper =

Douglas Cooper may refer to:

- Douglas Cooper (art historian) (1911–1984), British art historian and collector
- Douglas Anthony Cooper (born 1960), Canadian writer
- Douglas H. Cooper (1815–1879), American Civil War Confederate general
- Douglas Percival Cooper (1875–1950), British cinematographer
- Doug Cooper (racing driver) (1938–1987), American NASCAR driver
- Doug Cooper (author) (born 1970), American writer of literary fiction
