= Helen Cooper =

Helen Cooper may refer to:

- Helen Cooper (literary scholar) (born 1947), professor of Medieval and Renaissance English
- Helen Cooper (illustrator) (born 1963), illustrator and author of children's books
- Helen Cooper (politician) (born 1946), former mayor of Kingston, Ontario
- Helen J. Cooper, British chemist
