= Simon Cooper (banker) =

British banker

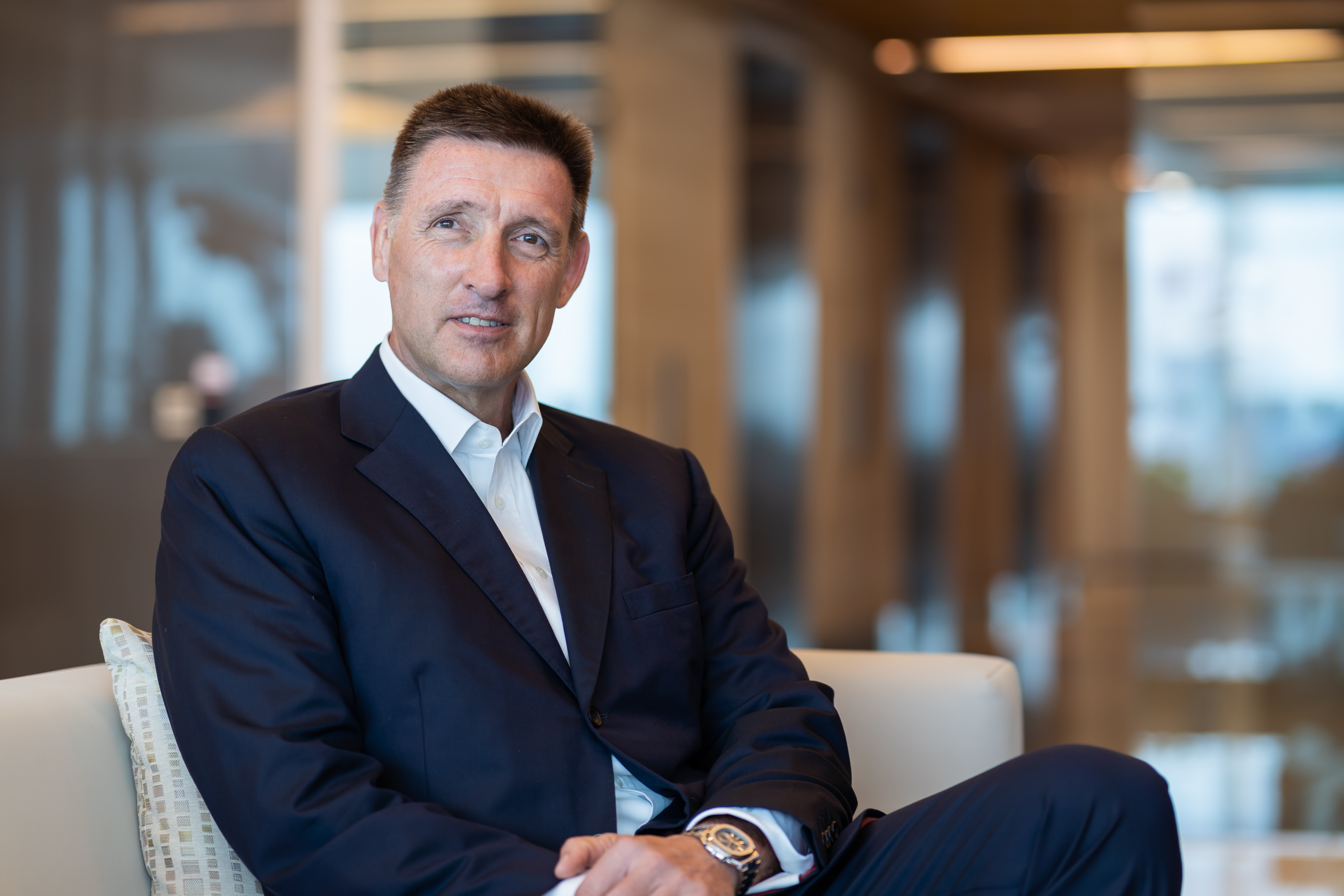
- Occupation: Banker
- Employer: Standard Chartered
- Title: Chief Executive Officer, Corporate, Commercial & Institutional Banking and CEO, Europe & Americas

Simon Cooper is a British banker. He is an Independent Non Executive Director of NORDEA Abp and of Olam Group. From 2016 to 2024 he was the chief executive officer of the Corporate, Commercial and Institutional Banking division of Standard Chartered, its largest global business with approximately USD12 billion in underlying operating income. He also was CEO of the bank’s Europe and Americas region and chairman of the group’s global Diversity and Inclusion Council.

Cooper previously spent 26-years at HSBC rising to chief executive of Global Commercial Banking.

== Education ==
Simon Cooper graduated from Jesus College, Cambridge with an MA in Law and is an alumnus of the Columbia Business School and INSEAD.

== Professional career ==
=== HSBC Group ===
Cooper joined the London merchant bank Samuel Montagu & Co. in 1989, as a graduate trainee. Following Samuel Montagu's acquisition by HSBC Group, Cooper became a director in corporate finance with the HSBC in London, Hong Kong and Singapore. Later roles included president and CEO HSBC Korea, managing director and head of Corporate and Investment banking in Singapore and deputy CEO and head of Corporate and Investment Banking in HSBC Thailand. He was appointed a Group General Manager of HSBC in May 2008 and responsible for HSBC’s business in the MENA region, and was latterly group managing director and chief executive, Global Commercial Banking.

Cooper was a board member of HSBC Bank Middle East Limited (Deputy Chairman), HSBC Bank Egypt S.A.E. (Chairman), HSBC Bank Oman SAOG (Chairman) and The Saudi British Bank.

=== Standard Chartered Bank ===
On 17 December 2015, Standard Chartered Bank announced the appointment of Cooper to head its Corporate and Institutional Banking business, effective April 2016, based in Singapore. He took responsibility for the group's commercial bank two years later, creating the Corporate, Commercial and Institutional Banking (CCIB) division, providing services to companies and financial institutions in approximately sixty markets around the world.

Cooper is Chair of the Advisory Board of the Lee Kong Chian School of Business.
