= Clarence Cooper =

Clarence Cooper may refer to:

- Clarence Cooper (judge) (born 1942), American judge
- Clarence Cooper Jr. (1934–1978), American author
- Clarence Owen Cooper (1899–1966), Canadian politician
