= Justice Cooper =

Justice Cooper may refer to:

- Charles Cooper (judge) (1795–1887), first chief justice of South Australia
- Charles H. Cooper (1865–1946), associate justice of the Montana Supreme Court
- Robert E. Cooper Sr. (1920–2016), associate justice of the Tennessee Supreme Court
- Tim E. Cooper (1843–1928), associate justice of the Supreme Court of Mississippi
- William Frierson Cooper (1820–1909), associate justice of the Tennessee Supreme Court

== See also ==
- Judge Cooper (disambiguation)
