= Tim Cooper =

Tim Cooper may refer to:

- Tim Cooper (brewer) (fl. 1970s–2000s), managing director of Coopers Brewery
- Tim Cooper (footballer) (fl. 1950s), New Zealand international
- Tim E. Cooper (1843–1928), American judge
