= Louise Cooper =

Louise Cooper may refer to:

- Louise Cooper (fantasy writer) (1952–2009), British fantasy writer
- Louise Cooper (financial analyst), British financial analyst and journalist
- Louise Cooper (footballer) (fl. 1996)

== See also ==
- Louise Cooper Spindle, American composer
- Louis Cooper, American football linebacker
