= Roy Cooper (disambiguation) =

Roy Cooper was the 75th governor of North Carolina (2017–2025).

Roy Cooper may also refer to:

- Roy Percy Cooper (1907–1976), ornithologist
- Roy Cooper (rodeo cowboy) (1955–2025), American rodeo cowboy
- Roy Cooper (West Virginia politician) (born 1945), Republican politician from West Virginia
- Roy Cooper, American music executive with Virgin Records, see All for You
