= Sherry Cooper =

Canadian economist

Sherry S. Cooper (born c. 1950) is a Canadian-American economist. Cooper is currently Chief Economist for Dominion Lending Centres. She was executive vice-president and chief economist of BMO Financial Group, with responsibilities for economic forecasting and risk assessment. She comments regularly in the press on financial issues.

== Education and career ==
Cooper was born in Baltimore, Maryland. She earned a B.A. from Goucher College in 1972 and an M.A. and PhD from the University of Pittsburgh in 1976 and 1978, respectively. From 1977 to 1982 she worked as an economist for the Federal Reserve Board, after which she joined the Federal National Mortgage Association (Fannie Mae) as Director of Financial Economics.

In 1983, accompanied by her (now-ex-)husband and her son, Stefan Atkinson (b. 1980), Cooper moved to Toronto to accept a position with Burns Fry Limited, subsequently becoming a dual citizen of Canada and the United States. Burns Fry was merged into BMO Capital Markets in 1994. In 2006, Sherry was appointed to the position as Chief Economist of BMO Financial Group, which includes BMO Harris Bank in the United States. On December 10, 2012, it was announced that Sherry Cooper would be retiring on January 30 as BMO Chief Economist.

Cooper is a member of the Economic Advisory Committee of the American Bankers Association, a group of twelve bank economists that meet to provide perspectives on the U.S. and global economies to the Federal Reserve Board, U.S. Congress and the executive branch. Cooper received the Lawrence Klein Award for U.S. forecasting accuracy in 2010.

Cooper is now married to Toronto businessman Peter J. Cooper.

== Press commentary ==
Cooper is best known for her often repeated prediction in the late 1990s that the devaluation of the Canadian dollar was an inexorable long-term trend, and that a Canada-U.S. currency union (which she describes as "dollarization") should be attempted immediately because the conversion rate would only be worse in future.

After the Canadian dollar achieved parity with the U.S. dollar on September 20, 2007, Cooper conceded that "dollarization in the real world is political... Canadians do not want to lose an independent Bank of Canada, and the U.S. probably wouldn’t want to incorporate Canadian considerations in their deliberations," but argued that a united currency would lead to a much simpler and more convenient world for North Americans.

By July 2008, her mindset had changed on the matter and she stated in a note to institutional investors that, "The world may realize that it is no longer reasonable for the (US) dollar to be the anchor currency."

In a January 2013 interview on CBC Radio's The Current she made the statement that the 2008 financial crisis would not have occurred "if the world had been full of female traders," and attributes the mismanagement to testosterone. In the same interview she also suggested that the members of the financial sector who were responsible were equally harmed by the crisis as others, such as people who lost their homes.

== Publications ==
- The New Retirement, Penguin Group Canada, 2008. ISBN 9780143055174
- Ride The Wave - Taking Control in the Acceleration Age, Financial Times Prentice Hall, 2002. ISBN 9780130670861
- The Cooper Files, Key Porter Publishing, 1999. ISBN 9781552631904
- Introduction to International Trade and Finance, with Norman C. Miller, University of Pittsburgh Press, 1974.
