= Mark Cooper =

Marcus, Marc or Mark Cooper may refer to:

== Academics ==
- Marc Cooper, American journalist, author, blogger and academic since 1960s
- Mark Cooper (artist) (born 1950), American multimedia painter and sculptor
- Mark Cooper (academic), American environmental economic research fellow since 1970s

== Sportsmen ==
- Mark Cooper (American football) (born 1960), NFL guard for Denver Broncos and Tampa Bay Buccaneers
- Mark Cooper (footballer, born 1967), English striker for Leyton Orient F.C. and Northampton Town F.C.
- Mark Cooper (footballer, born 1968), English midfielder and manager
- Marcus Cooper (American football) (born 1990), American football cornerback
- Marcus Cooper (canoeist) (born 1994), English-born Spanish Olympic gold medalist

== Others ==
- Mark A. Cooper (1800–1885), American congressman from Georgia
- Mark Cooper (politician), Maine state legislator
- Mark Cooper (judge), New Zealand jurist since 1980s
- Marcus Cooper (property developer) (born c.1966), British buyer and seller of high value real estate
- Marcus Ramone Cooper (born 1984), American R&B singer, stage name Pleasure P
  - The Introduction of Marcus Cooper, Pleasure P's 2009 debut album

== Characters ==
- Mark Cooper, teacher and coach in 1992–97 American sitcom Hangin' with Mr. Cooper
