= Kupfer =

Kupfer is a German surname (meaning copper); notable people with this surname include:

- Bettina Kupfer (born 1963), German actress and writer
- David Kupfer (born 1941), American psychiatrist
- Elsie Kupfer (1877–1974) German American mycologist
- Harry Kupfer (1935–2019), German opera director
- Herbert Kupfer (1927–2013), German civil engineer
- Jochen Kupfer (born 1969), German operatic baritone
- Brianna Kupfer (1997–2022), American murder victim
