= Jessica Cooper =

British designer and painter

Jessica Cooper (born 1967) is a designer and painter, living in Cornwall, England. She is a Royal West of England Academician and a member of the Newlyn Society of Artists.

Cooper was born in Bristol and grew up in Cornwall. During 1985 and 1986, Cooper did a foundation course at the Falmouth School of Art. At Goldsmiths College from 1986 to 1989 Cooper earned a B.A. (Hons) in Fine Art and Textiles. Cooper coordinated the educational programme for the Newlyn Art Gallery's St. Ives International in 1997. She organised and led the course The Representational to the Abstract at Dartington Hall. Cooper had a solo show at the Newlyn Gallery in 2001 and has featured in several group shows. Her work was featured in the 2007 "Art Now Cornwall" exhibition, at Tate St Ives.
