= Philip Cooper =

English cricketer

Philip Edward Cooper (19 February 1885 – 21 May 1950) was an English first-class cricketer, who played one match for Yorkshire County Cricket Club. Born in Rotherham, Yorkshire, England, Cooper had the odd distinction of going through his entire first-class career, without scoring a run, bowling a ball or taking his catch.

He recorded his pair against Middlesex at Bramall Lane, Sheffield, in August 1910, a match won by the visitors by 123 runs. He was more successful in the Yorkshire Second XI clash against Surrey in Rotherham the same month, scoring 27 as Yorkshire Seconds eased to an innings win.

He played for Rotherham C.C. in 1907 and Sheffield United C.C. in 1908 and 1909. Cooper captained Kent Second XI in 1921 and 1922, and later lived at Bramford, Suffolk. He was later known as Edward Whiteoak-Cooper.

Cooper died aged 65, in May 1950, on board the motor cruiser Sea Maiden at Hoveton, Norfolk.
