= Russell Cooper (disambiguation) =

Russell Cooper may refer to:

- Russell Cooper (born 1941), Australian politician
- Russell W. Cooper (born 1955), American economist and professor
- Russell K. Cooper, Canadian history advocate, and news photographer
- Russell Cooper Side Trail
