= Leo Cooper (historian) =

Polish Holocaust survivor and historian (born 1922)

Leo Cooper (born 1922) is a Polish Holocaust survivor and historian at the University of Melbourne.

Cooper was born in Warsaw, Poland in 1922, and was Jewish. As of April 2018, Cooper lived in Melbourne.

== Works ==
- Cooper, Leo (1992). Power and Politics in the Soviet Union: The Crumbling of an Empire. Springer. ISBN 978-1-349-12845-7.
- Cooper, L. (1999). Russia and the World: New State-of-Play on the International Stage. Springer. ISBN 978-0-230-37399-0.
- Cooper, Leo (2000). In the Shadow of the Polish Eagle: The Poles, the Holocaust and Beyond. Palgrave Macmillan UK. ISBN 978-0-333-96210-7.
- Cooper, Leo (2005). The Long Road to the Lucky Country. Makor Jewish Community Library. ISBN 978-1-876733-54-4.
- Cooper, Leo (2010). In the Shadow of the Crescent: The Arabs, the Holocaust and Beyond. Hybrid Publishers. ISBN 978-1-921665-00-4.
