= Thomas Thornville Cooper =

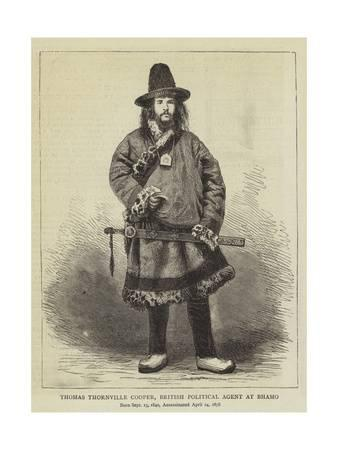
Thomas Thornville Cooper

Thomas Thornville Cooper (1839–1878) was an English traveller in China, and later a political agent in Burma.

== Early life ==
The eighth son of John Ibbetson Cooper, a coalfitter and shipowner, he was born on 13 September 1839, at Bishopwearmouth, County Durham. He was educated at the Grange School there, under James Cowan. He was then sent to a tutor in Sussex, where his health failed.

Cooper was advised to take a voyage to Australia. There he made journeys into the outback. In 1859 he went to India, and worked in Madras, in the house of Arbuthnot & Co. In 1861 he left his appointment, and went to Sindh on a visit to a brother who was living there. The following year, he visited Bombay, and moved in by way of Beypore and Madras to Burma. At Rangoon he studied the Burmese language.

== In China ==
In 1863 Cooper took ship to rejoin his brother, who was now at Shanghai. He became involved with the Shanghai volunteers of the Taiping Rebellion. When it ended, the opening up of China to foreign commerce proceeded. In 1868 Cooper, at the invitation of the Shanghai chamber of commerce, tried to travel through Tibet to India. On 4 January he left Hankou and travelled by way of Chengdu, Kangding, and Litang to Batang. From this point he had hoped to reach Rima on the Lohit River, over the Hengduan Mountains watershed, in eight days.

The Chinese authorities then intervened, forbidding Cooper to continue westwards. He therefore decided to take the Dali City route to Bhamo. It involved at that time traversing the Panthay kingdom, the site of a Muslim insurgency, with its capital at Dali.

Cooper therefore struck southwards, following the valley of the Lancang Jiang and reached Zegu on its western bank. This was the most westerly point that had been explored by Westerners starting from China, in the region of the major rivers north of Bhamo. Here he was within a hundred miles of Manchi (Mangkyi), then in Hkamti Long, a Shan state. It is on the N'Mai River, and had been visited by the military surveyor Richard Wilcox, from India, in 1826.

Still continuing his journey southwards, Cooper arrived at Weixi City, nearly due west of Lijiang, where he obtained passports for Dali City. At a distance of three days' journey from Weixi, however, he was stopped by a local chief, who refused to allow him to proceed. He was compelled, therefore, to return to Weixi, where he was imprisoned and threatened with death by the civil authorities: he was suspected of being in touch with the Panthay rebels. For five weeks he was kept prisoner, and was then (6 August) allowed to depart.

Cooper then returned to Ya'an, and travelled down the Min River to Yibin, on the Yangzi River. He descended the Yangzi to Hankou, where he arrived on 11 November 1868. He shortly returned to England.

== 1869 expedition ==
Having failed to reach India from China, Cooper attempted in 1869 to reverse the process, and to enter China from Assam. On this journey he left Sadiya in October of that year, and passing up the line of the Brahmaputra, through the Mishmi country, reached Prun, a village about twenty miles from Rima. Here he again met with such determined opposition from the authorities, that he was obliged to turn back.

== Later career and death ==
Shortly after his return to England, Cooper was appointed by the India Office to accompany the Panthay mission which had visited London to the frontier of Yunnan. On arriving at Rangoon, however, he learned that the rebellion had been crushed, and his mission was therefore at an end. Lord Northbrook appointed him political agent at Bhamo. Ill-health then obliged him to return almost immediately to England, where he was attached to the political department of the India Office.

In 1876 Cooper was sent to India with despatches and presents to the viceroy in connection with the imperial durbar of Delhi, and was subsequently reappointed political agent at Bhamo. While there (1877) he welcomed William Gill, author of River of Golden Sand, after his journey through China.

Cooper was murdered on 24 April 1878 at Bamo by a sepoy of his guard, over a grudge.

== Works ==
- Journal of an Overland Journey from China towards India (1869)
- A Pioneer of Commerce (1871)
- The Mishmee Hills (1873)
