= Michael Cooper (disambiguation) =

Michael Cooper (born 1956) is an American basketball coach and former player.

Michael Cooper may also refer to:

== Arts and entertainment ==
- Michael Cooper (musician) (1952–2023), founding member of the reggae band Third World
- Michael Cooper, American musician, lead singer and guitarist for the R&B band Con Funk Shun
- Michael Cooper (photographer) (1941–1973), British photographer
- Michael Cooper Jr., actor and co-star of 2025 television series Forever

== Sports ==
- Michael Cooper (footballer) (born 1999), English goalkeeper for Sheffield United
- Michael Cooper (racing driver) (born 1989), American race car driver
- Michael Cooper (rower) (1948–2015), British rower who competed in the 1968 and 1972 Summer Olympics
- Michael Cooper (rugby league) (born 1988), English rugby league footballer

== Others ==
- Michael Cooper (economist) (1938–2017), British economist
- Michael Cooper (historian) (1930–2018), historical writer on Japan
- Michael "Mini" Cooper (born 1963 or 1964), subject of the 1975 documentary Mini
- Michael Cooper (politician) (born 1984), Canadian politician
- Michael Cooper (headmaster) (born 1949), British educator

== See also ==
- Mike Cooper (disambiguation)
