= Thomas Cooper (Parliamentarian) =

Thomas Cooper (died 1659) was a colonel in the Parliamentary Army who fought in the English Civil War and aided in the Cromwellian occupation of Ireland. He was appointed to the Cromwell's Upper House, and died in 1659.

Cooper was of an ancient and respectable family in Oxfordshire, which had possessed the manor of South Weston, with other estates in that county for several centuries; he was an alderman of Oxford, which place he represented in the Short Parliament called by King Charles I in 1640, with Lord Howard; but that assembly, having been most imprudently dissolved, (Note: Nobel could have misread his source, this may have been another Thomas Cooper (c.1593–1640) who was Mayor of Oxford in 1628 (Jenkins, Stephanie. Thomas Cooper Mayor of Oxford 1630/1, website of Oxford History, Oxford Retrieved 3 August 2012)) he was again returned to the Long Parliament. He rose in the Parliament army to the rank of Colonel of foot, and accompanied Oliver Cromwell into Scotland in 1651. He afterwards was sent into Ireland. In 1656, he was one of the representatives of the counties of Down, Antrim, and Armagh, in the latter kingdom. Some time after the initial nominations, he accepted the nomination as a lord in Cromwell's Upper House. His name is under the order for proclaiming Richard Cromwell Protector. What he may have gained during the usurpation was not known to Mark Nobel, who was writing at the end of the eighteenth century, but Nobel speculated that perhaps it was considerable; for though Cooper was a great sufferer by the restoration of the monarchy, his descendant and heir, Thomas Cooper, Esq. inhered the manor at South Weston, with other properties, in Oxfordshire, of the value of £1000 per annum. (Note: Noble is supported by Reid, basing his account on John Thurloe's manuscripts as a source, assert that the Thomas Cooper who was an English soldier who moved from Scotland to Ireland, was the Thomas Cooper who was also in London in 1658. Noble is also supported by Anne Conway, who in a footnote to a letter dated 5 July 1659 to from Lord Conway in Kensington, to his brother Major Rawdon. In it Conway states he had recently spoken to a Colonel Cooper (presumably in London) to which Conway states in a footnote "Thomas Cooper whom Cromwell had put in charge of forces in Ulster in 1655".(Conway p. 160 footnote). However Aidan Clarke states that the Colonel Thomas Cooper who was in Ulster was a Scotsman and that he died in Ulster on 21 December 1659.(Clarke pp. 58, 115))

== Notes ==
Footnotes

Citations
