= Thomas Sidney Cooper =

English painter (1803–1902)

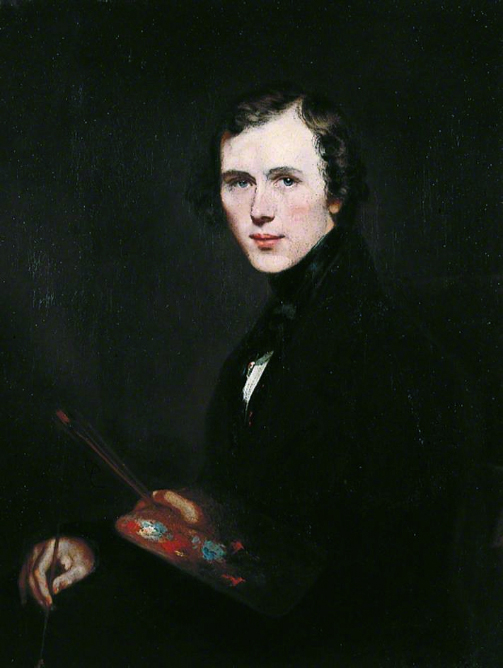
Self-portrait (c. 1832)

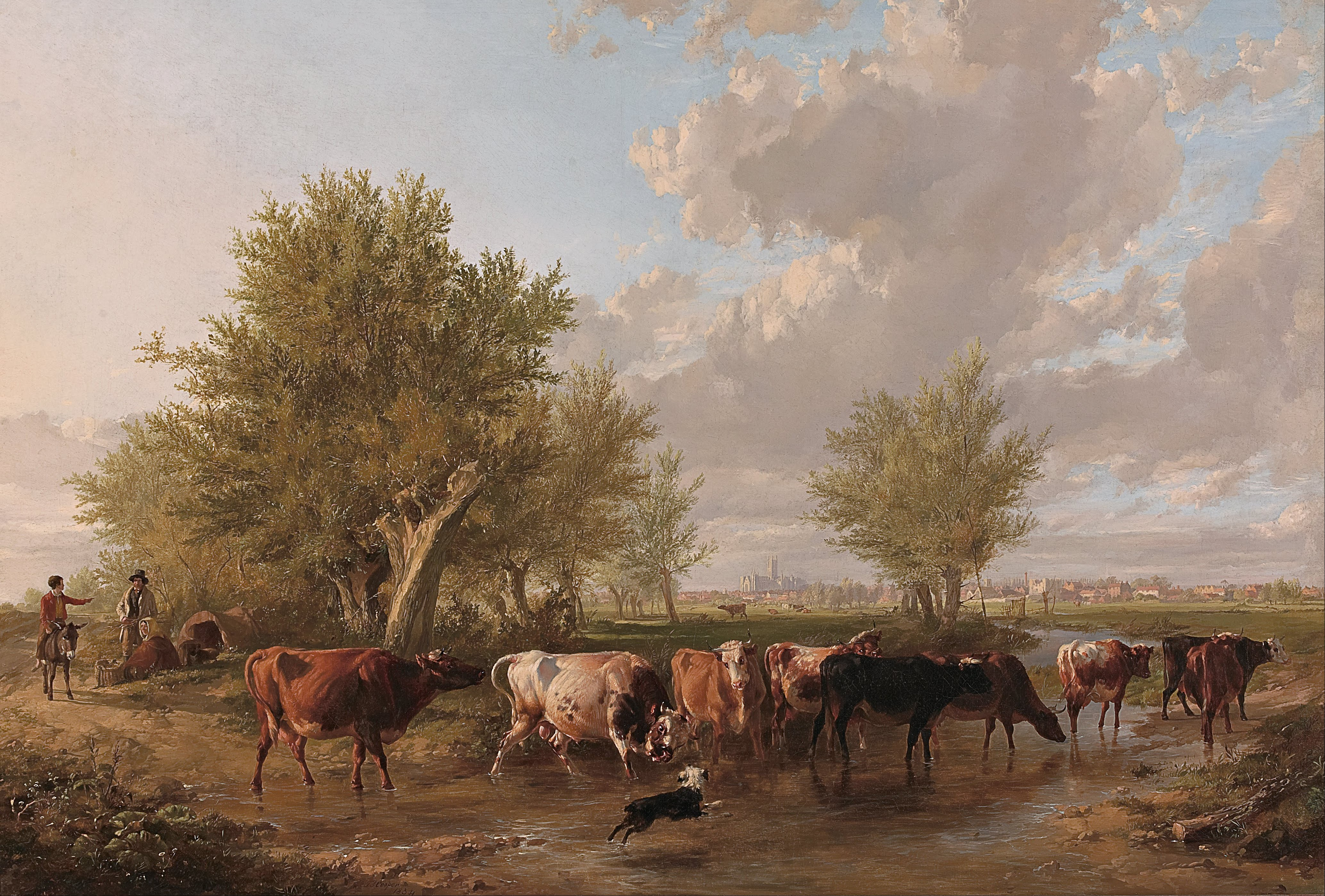
Thomas Sidney Cooper Fording a brook, suburbs of Canterbury 1834

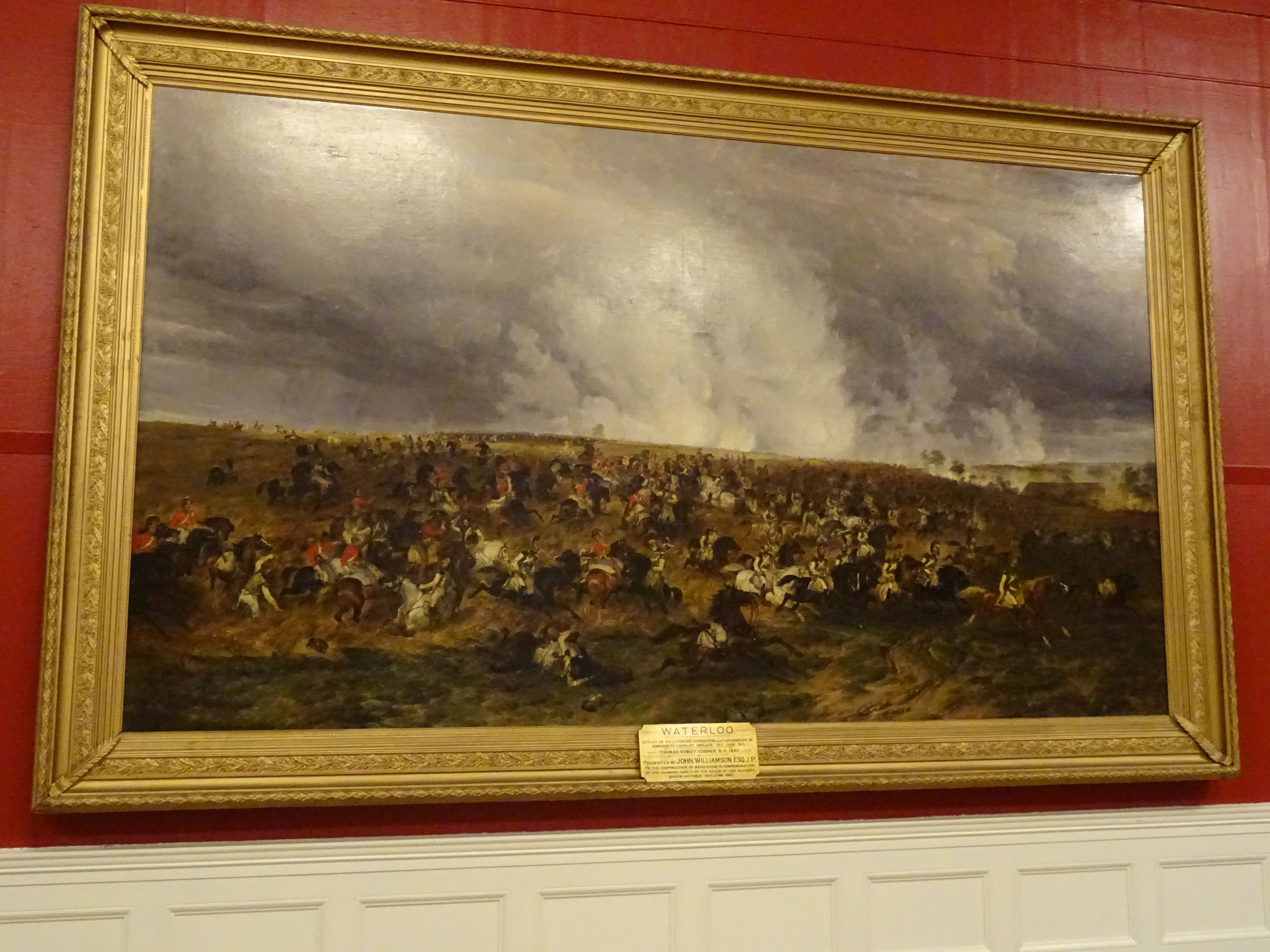
The Battle of Waterloo, 1847. Williamson Art Gallery, Birkenhead

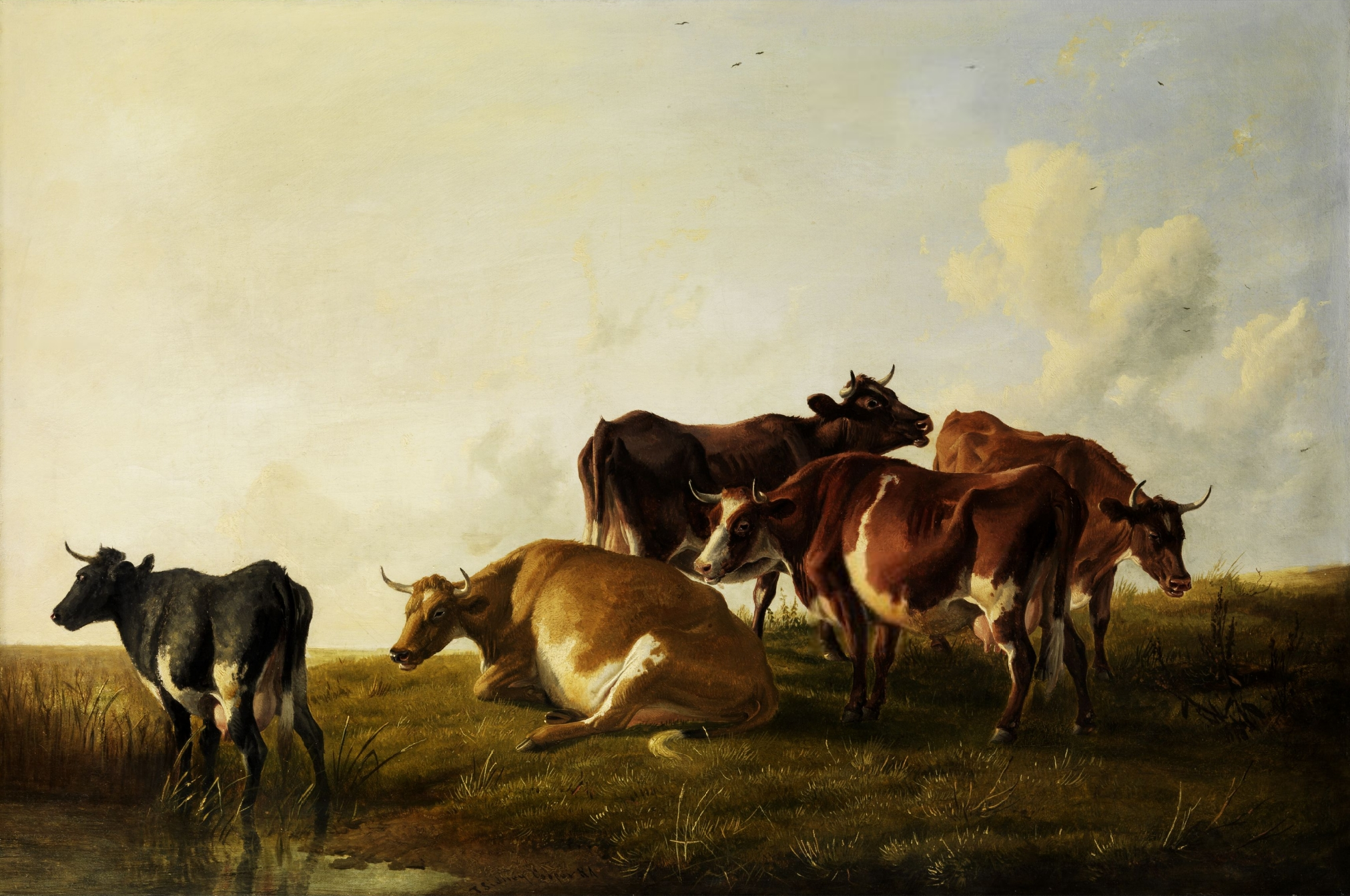
Cattle in the pasture by Thomas Sidney Cooper, 1881.

Thomas Sidney Cooper CVO RA (26 September 1803 – 7 February 1902) was an English landscape painter from Canterbury, noted for his images of cattle and farm animals.

His most typical subjects ("repetitive" according to Mallalieu) are small groups of cows or sheep at rest, or often the two mixed together, occupying most of the picture space. He painted in both oils and watercolour, with oils predominating. Many are set in the marshes around Canterbury.

== Early life ==
Thomas Sidney Cooper was born in St Peter's Street in Canterbury, Kent, and baptised at St Peter's Church. As a small child he began to show strong artistic talent, but his family had little money (his father had deserted the family when the boy was five) and could not pay for any tuition, or even for paper and pencils. Indeed, to help support the family, by the time he was twelve years old he was working as a coach painter, then later as a scenery painter with a travelling theatre company, and he alternated between these two occupations for about eight years. He still had a driving desire to become an artist, and all his spare moments were spent drawing and painting from nature. At the age of twenty he went to London, drew for a while in the British Museum, and after much perseverance was admitted as a student of the Royal Academy.

Unable to afford to continue living in London he was forced to return to Canterbury, where he earnt a living as a drawing master and by the sale of sketches and drawings. In 1827 he and friend went to Brussels and through some luck and perseverance, Cooper started to make a living through painting portraits and also becoming a drawing master. Here he met and married Charlotte Pearson. He also met Eugène Joseph Verboeckhoven who was to have a great influence on his painting. The Belgian Revolution of 1830 saw Cooper and Charlotte returning to London with their first child. Cooper tried his luck in London again, selling sketches and teaching and showed his first picture at the Royal Academy in 1833, beginning a long and prolific career as an exhibitor at the Royal Academy and British Institution among others. His 'Intercepted Raid, Ettrick Shepherd', exhibited at the Royal Academy in 1842, an oil on canvas, sold at Sotheby’s for £37,500 making it, at that time, the most valuable work to be sold at auction.

When the competition was announced for the decoration for the new Houses of Parliament, to be held at Westminster Hall in 1847, Cooper submitted The Defeat of Kellermann's Cuirassiers and Carabiniers by Somerset's Cavalry Brigade at Waterloo, June 18, 1815, without success. In order to complete the picture, the artist used Captain William Siborne's model of the battlefield then on exhibition in London, while a friend in Brussels sent him breastplates worn by the various cavalry regiments, and a trooper of the Life Guards acted as a model.

One of the finest landscape painters of his day, he is mainly associated with pictures of cattle or sheep, a fact that earned him the epithet "Cow Cooper". Cooper collaborated between 1847 and 1870 with Frederick Richard Lee R.A. on several paintings, Lee undertaking the landscapes, and Cooper adding animals to complete the scene. He travelled round the country, sometimes with his son, painting in Wales, Scotland and the Lake District as well as his home county of Kent.

In London he moved in elevated circles, counting many artists, politicians and writers, including Charles Dickens, as his friends. He had a long acquaintanceship with J. M. W. Turner whom he describes in his autobiography as taking a ‘great interest in me and my success’. Cooper also was favoured by Queen Victoria who invited him to Osborne House on the Isle of Wight.

Cooper was elected an Associate of the Royal Academy (ARA) in 1845 and Royal Academician (RA) on 22 June 1867.

== Cooper and Canterbury ==
Cooper had a long association with his birthplace, Canterbury. At the height of his fame in London he moved back to the city, building a house, Vernon Holme, in Harbledown and living in it until his death in 1902. (Vernon Holme now houses Kent College Junior School.) From the first year that he settled in the country, he started breeding his own animals, so that he always had models at hand. He was of the opinion that 'all Landscape painters should live in the country'.

He loved the theatre and in 1856 bought a block of buildings on Guildhall Street and, drawing on his past experiences as a scenery painter, designed a new theatre for Canterbury. His great friend Charles Dickens, who gave a reading there, praised the design saying 'Why Cooper, I have not had to make the slightest effort to send my voice even to the back seats of the gallery'.

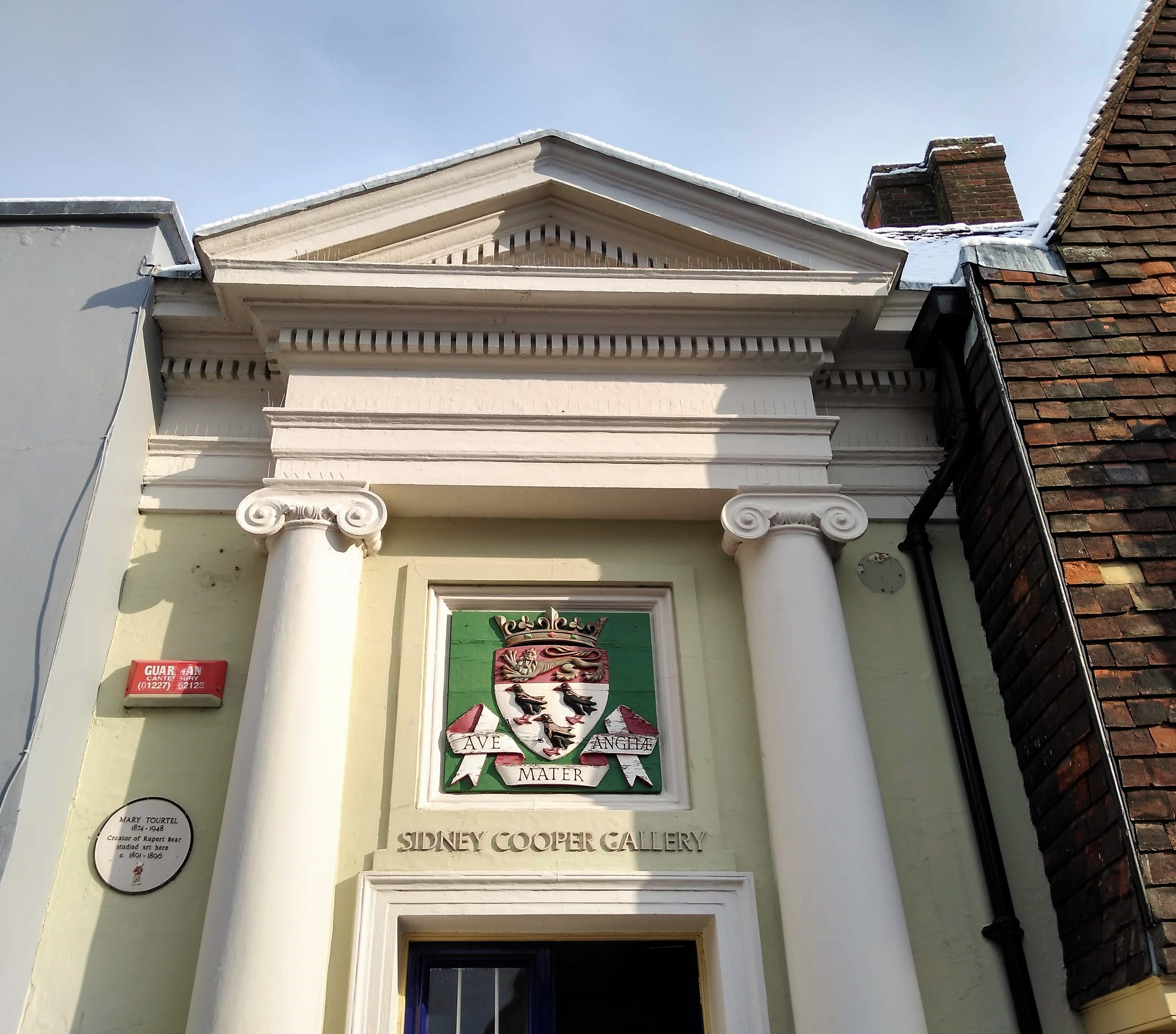
Sidney Cooper Gallery Canterbury

He was a great philanthropist in Canterbury, and used some of his wealth to help the poor in the city. In 1868, he purchased the house where he had been born on St Peter's Street and where his mother had lived, and the block of buildings around it, building the portico as the entrance, to establish the Sidney Cooper Gallery and Art School. This was partly as a memorial to his mother Sarah (1776-1865) but also to provide free tuition to poorer local students who wished to study art, providing the teaching that was missing during his early years. The students were charged only one penny to cover the cost of lighting and fire in the winter. His fellow Academician friends donated casts, statues and drawings for students to study and some donated their time to act as examiners, including Lawrence Alma-Tadema, William Morris and Edward Poynter. The school was affiliated with the Science and Art Department in South Kensington led by Henry Cole, the first director of the Victoria and Albert Museum. Amongst Cooper's more well-known students was Mary Tourtel, creator and illustrator of the Rupert Bear books for children. Cooper himself came regularly to teach often staying late in the evenings to help those boys and girls who could not come during the day.

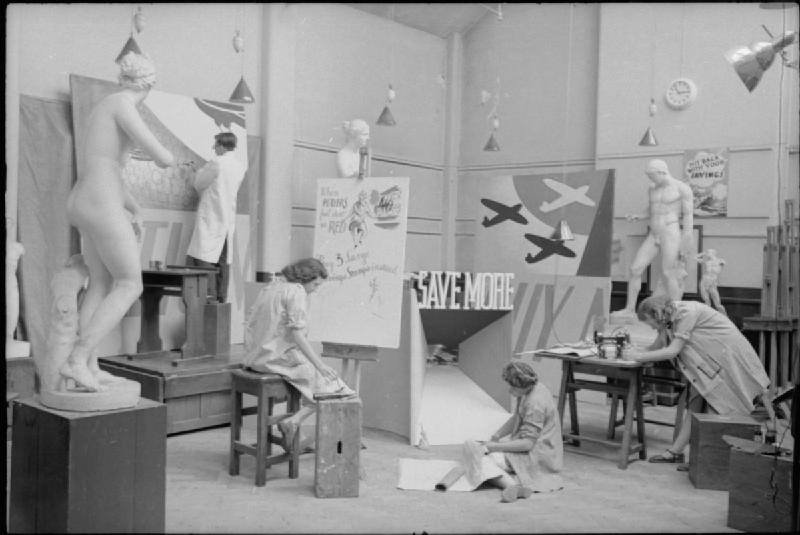
Students in the Sidney Cooper Gallery 1941

Cooper left both the Gallery and house in Trust to the Canterbury City Council of the day with the condition that it be used for artistic and educational purposes. Since then the space has been through a number of incarnations. Ian Dury of Blockheads fame taught at the school from 1970-1973 when it was known as the Canterbury College of Art. Michael Craig Martin RA and Humphrey Ocean RA are alumni. The College outgrew the Gallery space on the high street and moved to a new campus south of the city centre in 1971, eventually becoming part of the Kent Institute for Art and Design (KIAD) in 1987, which itself merged into the University for the Creative Arts in 2005. The UCA’s newly entitled Canterbury School of Art, Architecture and Design celebrates its Cooper legacy.

Since the school moved, the Gallery on the high street has been used by community groups, and by the UCA and Canterbury Christ Church University as a working studio and exhibition space. The Gallery has been empty since 2020 and is in some need of repair.

== Legacy ==
Cooper wrote his reminiscences, under the title of My Life, in 1890. Among many fascinating anecdotes, he recalls fleeing the fighting in Brussels when the Belgian Revolution broke out, his meetings with JMW Turner, with Charles Dickens and his commission by Queen Victoria to paint a prize bull. Thomas and Charlotte had four children; his son, Thomas George Cooper, also became an artist. Twenty years after his first wife died Cooper married Mary Cannon and had a son, Nevill.

The oldest member of the Royal Academy of Arts at the time of the accession of King Edward VII in 1901, Cooper was received by the King in July 1901, and appointed a Commander of the Royal Victorian Order (CVO). Painting right until the end of his life, such was his fame that his declining health in 1901 was reported in newspapers, where he was referred to as 'the grand old man of art'. His funeral was at Canterbury Cathedral and he is buried in the graveyard of St Martin's Church, Canterbury. So prolific a painter was he that the studio sale conducted by Christies in 1902 after his death lasted a full three days.

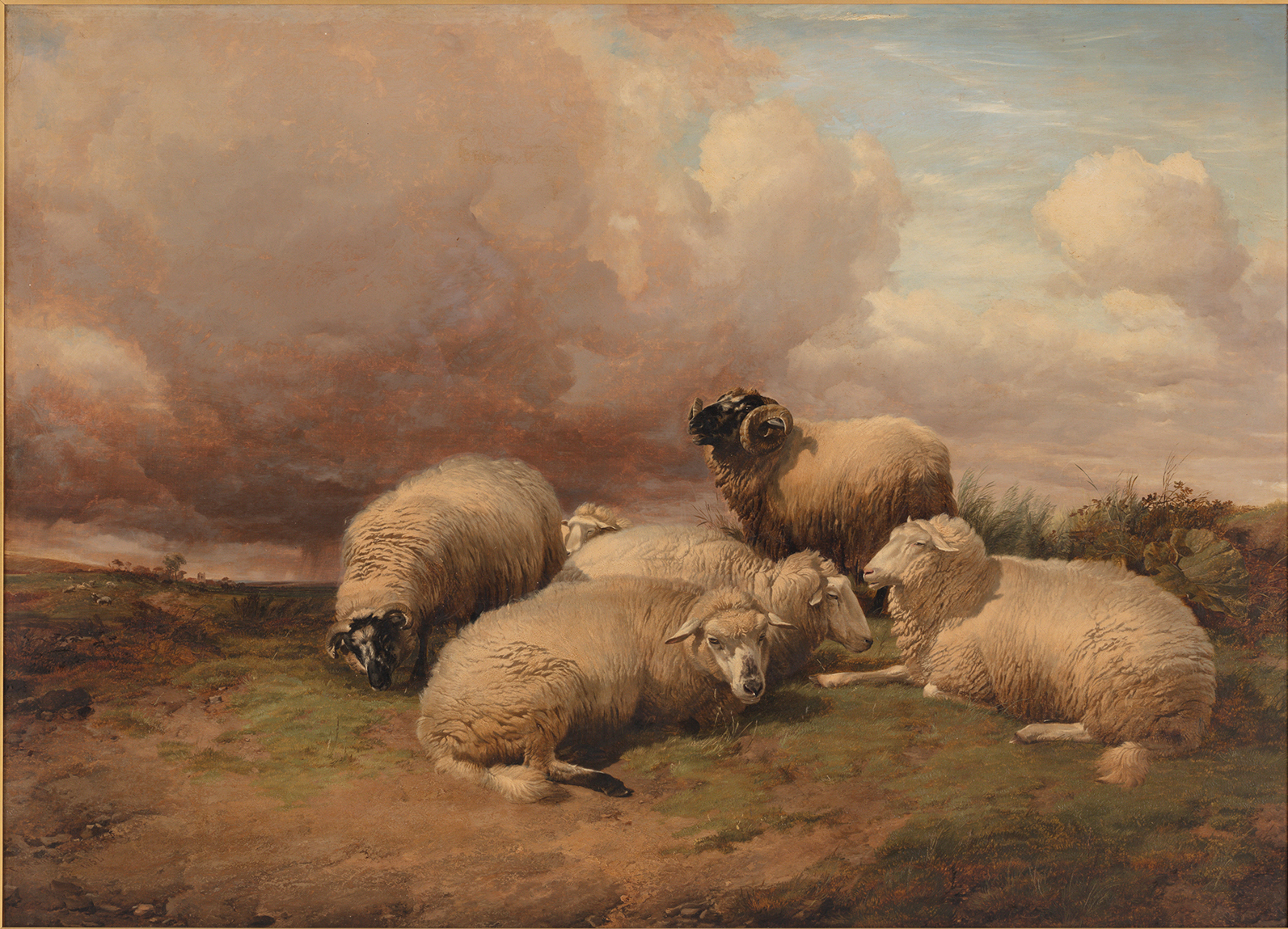
Highland Sheep, oils

His paintings "have been extensively faked, both in his lifetime and subsequently. Many of the earliest frauds were taken from the lithographs which were issued in the 1840s."

The largest public collection of Cooper paintings is owned by Canterbury City Council and housed at the Beaney House of Art & Knowledge in Canterbury. Examples are also held by the Tate Gallery, London, and the Victoria and Albert Museum, London, and other public collections, mainly in Britain. The definitive account of his life and catalogue of his work 'Thomas Sidney Cooper - His Life and Work', by Kenneth Westwood was published in two volumes in 2011 by David Leathers, Ilminster.

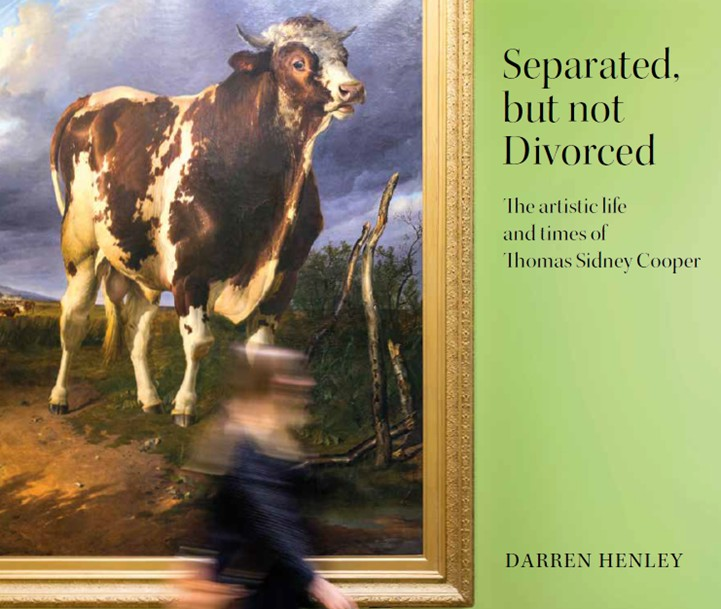
Separated but not Divorced by Dr Darren Henley

== Sidney Cooper Arts Trust ==
The Sidney Cooper Arts Trust www.sidneycooperarts.org was set up in November 2025 (Charity number 1215959) to promote the legacy of Sidney Cooper and to explore options for re-opening the Sidney Cooper building as an arts centre for the people of Canterbury. (The Trust incorporated the work of the Sidney Cooper Research Group founded in 2023.) The Trust sponsored a talk on Sidney Cooper's legacy at the Canterbury Festival, October 2025, by Darren Henley, Chief Executive of the Arts Council England ‘in conversation’ with Hedley Roberts, Executive Dean of the UCA. Darren’s book 'Separated but not Divorced, The Artistic Life and Times of Thomas Sidney Cooper' re-appraising the artistic and social legacy of the artist, was published in February 2026 and is available from The Beaney Museum in Canterbury and Waterstones Canterbury.

== Selected paintings ==
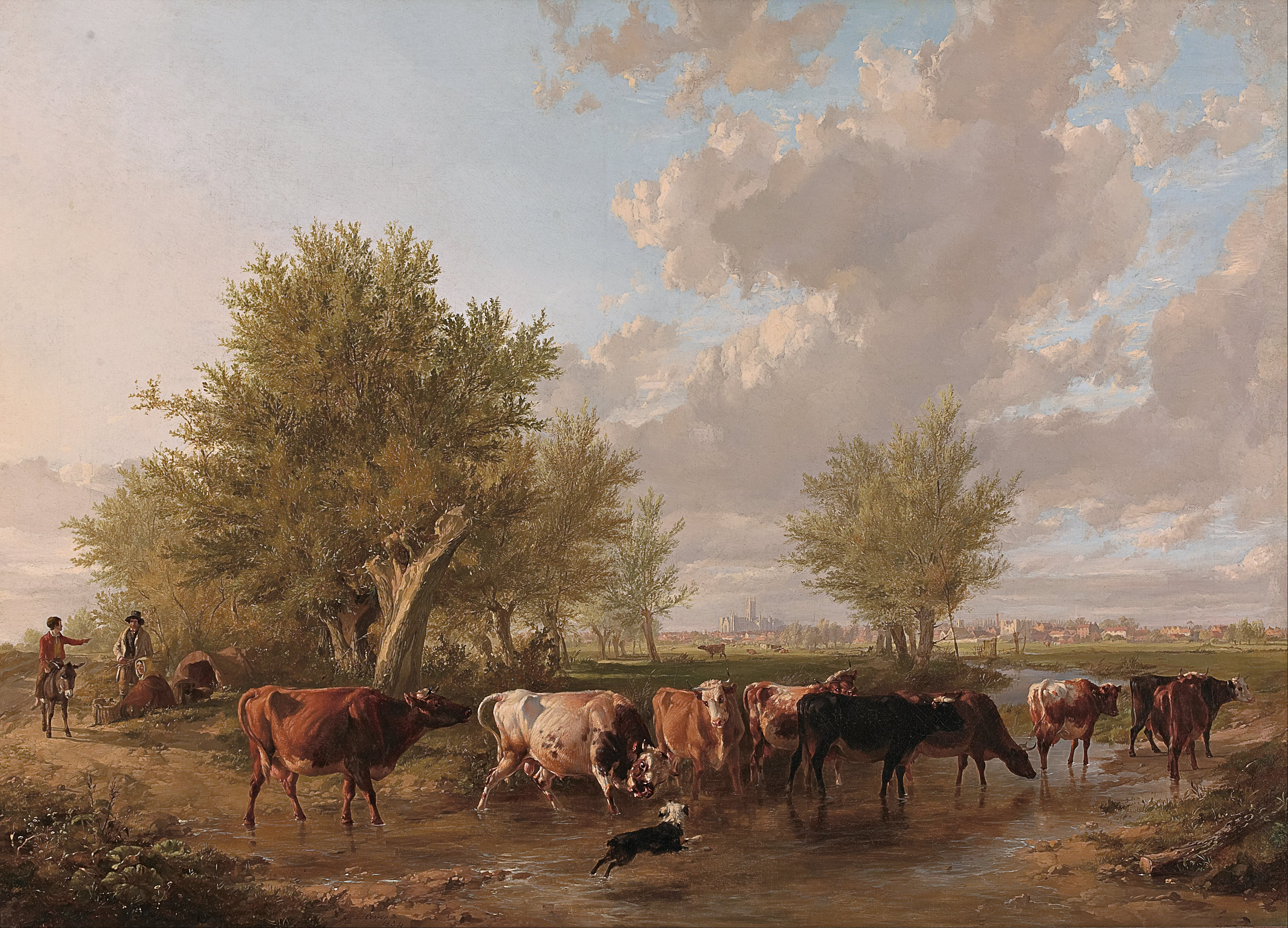
Fording a brook, suburbs of Canterbury, oils, 1834

- Milking Time (1834)
- A Summer's Noon (1836)
- A Drover's Halt on the Fells (1838)
- A Group in the Meadows (1845)
- Waterloo, the defeat of Kellerman's Cuirassiers (1847)
- The Shepherd's Sabbath (1866)
- Milking Time in the Meadows (1869)
- The Monarch of the Meadows (1873)
- Separated but not Divorced (1874)
- Isaac's Substitute (1880)
- Pushing off for Tilbury Fort (1884)
- Cattle and Sheep in a Landscape (1888)
- On a Farm in East Kent (1889)
- Return to the Farm, Milking Time (1897)

== See also ==
- William Sidney Cooper
- British art
