= Tom Cooper (baseball) =

Negro league baseball player

- Catcher
- Batted: Both Threw: Right

Negro league baseball debut
- 1947, for the Kansas City Monarchs

Last Negro league baseball appearance
- 1952, for the Kansas City Monarchs
- Stats at Baseball Reference

Teams
- Kansas City Monarchs (1947–1952)

Thomas Cooper was an American professional baseball catcher in the Negro leagues, and minor leagues. He played in the Negro leagues with the Kansas City Monarchs from 1947 to 1952. He played in the Philadelphia Phillies minor league system with the Schenectady Blue Jays in 1953 and 1957, and the Trois-Rivieres Phillies in 1954.
