= Tom Cooper (rugby union) =

English rugby union player

Tom Nooth Cooper
- Born: Tom Cooper; 18 February 1987 (age 39) Oxford, England
- Height: 6 ft 1 in (1.85 m)
- Weight: 15 st 4 lb (97 kg)
- School: Magdalen College School, Oxford
- University: Cardiff University

Rugby union career
- Position: Centre
- Current team: Jersey
Youth career
- Oxford RFC
Senior career
| Years | Team | Apps | (Points) |
| –2011 | Bedwas RFC | | |
| 2010–11 | Newport GD | 1 | (0) |
| 2011–12 | Cornish Pirates | 16 | (32) |
| 2012- | Jersey | | |
International career
| Years | Team | Apps | (Points) |
- Welsh Universities

Tom Cooper (born 18 February 1987, Oxford) is an English rugby union footballer. A centre, he played for Bedwas RFC and the Newport Gwent Dragons regional team. Cooper made his debut for the Newport Gwent Dragons against Gloucester on 4 November 2010. He was released by Newport Gwent Dragons at the end of the 2010–11 Magners League. He then went on to play for the Cornish Pirates in the RFU Championship during the 2011–12 season, making 16 appearances. Tom signed to play for Jersey for the 2012–13 season, again in the RFU Championship.
