= Thomas Joshua Cooper =

American photographer

- Born: December 19, 1946 (age 79); San Francisco, California, U.S.
- Education: Humboldt State University, University of New Mexico
- Known for: Photography

Thomas Joshua Cooper FRSE (born December 19, 1946) is an American photographer. He is considered among the premier contemporary landscape photographers.

== Early life and education ==
Cooper studied art, philosophy and literature and received his bachelor's degree from Humboldt State University in Arcata, California in 1969. In 1972, he received his master's of art in photography with honors from the University of New Mexico.

== Inspiration ==
Cooper was inspired by the works of the photographers of the f/64 group of the 1930s and 1940s, such as Ansel Adams. Cooper stated, "I'll live and die by the late works of Edward Weston, Alfred Stieglitz and Paul Strand, and I think Robert Frank is the most extraordinary living photographic picture-maker."

== Career ==
Cooper's first solo show took place in 1971. He has had more than 95 solo exhibitions since then. After teaching art and photography in a number of schools in California, Cooper moved to England.

In 1982 he launched the Fine Art Photography programme at the Glasgow School of Art. He is now retired.

Cooper loves being a photographer, but is frustrated by some of the vocabulary that is used in the field. He indicates, "I hate the words "snap", "shoot" and "take" when it comes to making photographs. Everything I do is very seriously built up. They are 'made' pictures."

Not only a photographer, Cooper is a poet and has written haiku books. Most of them are inspired by nature and reflect his photography.

In 2009 Cooper achieved a Guggenheim Fellowship in Photography.

Cooper has lived in Scotland since the 1980s and he is represented by Ingleby Gallery, Edinburgh, Scotland.

At the end of September, 2019, on the 500th anniversary of the beginning of Magellan's circumnavigation of the world, Cooper opened for the first time "The Atlas of Emptiness and Extremity," at the Los Angeles County Museum of Art: In an exhibition called The World's Edge' comprising 65 large-scale and 75 8 x 10 black-and-white photographs, showcases Cooper's The Atlas of Emptiness and Extremity, The World's Edge, and The Atlantic Basin Project, which he first embarked upon in 1987, to chart the Atlantic Basin from the extreme points of each north, south, east, and west coordinates. Open from 21 September until 2 February 2020 in the Resnick Pavilion.

== Awards and honours ==
- 1970, John D. Phelen Award in Art and Literature .
- 1994, Major Artists Award, Scottish Arts Council, Edinburgh, Scotland
- 1999, Major Artist's Award, Lannan Foundation, Santa Fe, New Mexico
- 2014, Elected a Fellow of the Royal Society of Edinburgh

== Museums ==
Cooper's works are held by over fifty museums and public collections, among them:

- Art Institute of Chicago, Chicago, Illinois
- Denver Art Museum, Denver Colorado
- The J. Paul Getty Museum, Los Angeles, California
- Museum of Fine Arts, Houston (MFAH), Houston, Texas
- Los Angeles County Museum of Art (LACMA), Los Angeles, California
- Carré d'Art (Nîmes Museum of Contemporary Art), Nîmes, France
- Princeton University Art Museum, Princeton, New Jersey
- The Tate Gallery, London, England
- The Victoria and Albert Museum, London, England
