= Samuel Cooper (clergyman) =

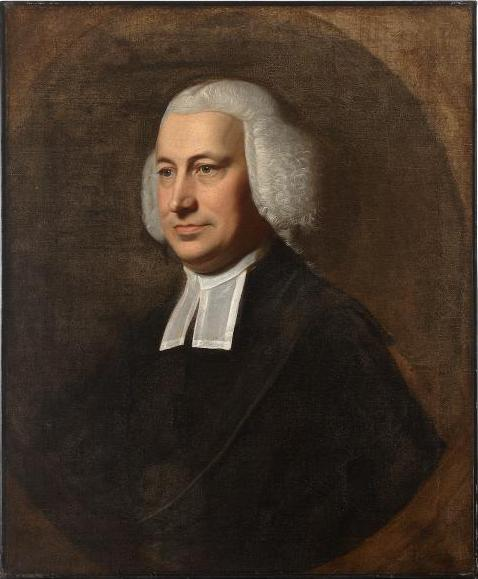
An 18th century portrait of Cooper by John Singleton Copley

Samuel Cooper (March 28, 1725 – December 29, 1783) was a Congregational minister in Boston, Massachusetts, affiliated with the Brattle Street Church.

== Early life and education ==
Cooper was born in Boston on March 28, 1725, to William Cooper and Judith Sewall. He attended the Boston Latin School and Harvard College, where he graduated in 1743.

== Career ==
He was ordained as a minister on May 21, 1746, and served as pastor of Brattle Street Church from 1747 to 1783. Members of his parish at the Brattle St. Church included some of the most influential people of the American Revolution, including John Adams, Samuel Adams, John Hancock, Joseph Warren, and others. He corresponded with Benjamin Franklin, Charles Hector d'Estaing, Gideon Hawley, Charles Gravier de Vergennes, and was associated with Phillis Wheatley.

In 1780, he co-founded the American Academy of Arts and Sciences. He served as chaplain to the General Court from 1758 to 1770 and 1777 to 1783. Around 1783, Harvard College offered Cooper the position of college president, but Cooper declined.

== Personal life ==
In September 1746, he married Judith Bulfinch; they had two daughters. A portrait of Cooper by John Singleton Copley now resides in the collection of the Massachusetts Historical Society.

== Selected publications ==
- A sermon preached to the Ancient and Honourable Artillery Company in Boston, New-England, June 3, 1751 : being the anniversary of their election of officers. Boston: Printed by J. Draper for J. Edwards ... and D. Gookin, 1751.
- A sermon preached in Boston, New-England before the Society for Encouraging Industry, and Employing the Poor; August 8. 1753. Boston: Printed by J. Draper, for D. Henchman, in Cornhill, 1753.
- A sermon preached in the audience of His Honour Spencer Phips, Esq; lieutenant governor and commander in chief; the Honourable His Majesty's Council; and the Honourable House of Representatives, of the province of the Massachusetts-Bay in New-England, May 26. 1756 Being the anniversary for the election of His Majesty's of the Council for the said province. Boston, New-England: Printed by Green and Russell, by order of the Honourable House of Representatives. 1756.
- A sermon preached before His Excellency Thomas Pownall, Esq; captain-general and governor in chief, the Honourable His Majesty's Council and House of Representatives, of the province of the Massachusetts-Bay in New-England, October 16, 1759 Upon an occasion of the success of His Majesty's arms in the reduction of Quebec. Boston massacucetts New-England: Printed by Green & Russell, and Edes & Gill, by order of His Excellency the governour, and both Houses of Assembly, 1759.
- A sermon preach'd April 9, 1760 : at the ordination of the Reverend Mr. Joseph Jackson, to the pastoral care of the church of Brooklin. Boston, New-England: Printed by John Draper, 1760.
- A sermon upon occasion of the death of our late Sovereign, George the Second Preach'd before His Excellency Francis Bernard, Esq; captain-general and governor in chief, the Honourable His Majesty's Council, and House of Representatives, of the province of the Massachusetts-Bay in New-England, January 1. 1761. Boston: Printed by John Draper, printer to His Excellency the governor and the Honorable His Majesty's Council, 1761.
- A discourse on the man of sin; delivered in the chapel of Harvard College, in Cambridge, New-England, September 1, 1773. Boston: Printed and sold at Greenleaf's printing-office, in Hanover-Street, 1774.
- A sermon preached before His Excellency John Hancock, Esq; governour, the Honourable the Senate, and House of Representatives of the Commonwealth of Massachusetts, October 25, 1780 Being the day of the commencement of the Constitution, and inauguration of the new government. Boston, Commonwealth of Massachusetts: Printed by T. and J. Fleet, and J. Gill, 1780.
- Cooper was a direct ancestor on my mother's side - her father was named after him - Marvin Cooper Taylor. Samuel Cooper was also entrusted by Washington (Cooper having signed his Honorary Harvard Law Degree) and others with one of the eight rough draft copies of the Treaty of Paris - his was one of only two with the Spread-Wing Eagle Seal of The United States on the cover. He made his corrections and suggested changes in the margins of the rough draft - many of which were adopted in the final version. My family sold his copy of the rough draft of The Treaty of Paris; a 7-Page letter written to him by his friend Lafayette after the surrender at Yorktown; and a number of the sermons mentioned above, at auction at Swann Galleries, New York, NY (USA) - c. 2001. They are now in major university collections and at Williamsburg.
