= Thomas Frederick Cooper (watchmaker) =

English watchmaker

Thomas Frederick Cooper (1789 – 9 March 1863) was a well-known Victorian English watchmaker in London who made high quality timepieces, particularly for the American market.

== Biography ==
Cooper was active for over forty years from about 1819 at several addresses in London:

1819–1822/3 at 16 Wynwatt Street, Northampton Square, Clerkenwell

1826–1832 at 5 President Street, St Luke's

1835–1837 at 4 Duncan Place, City Road

1837–1838 at 18 King William Street, City of London

1839–1875 at 6 Calthorpe Street, Gray's Inn Road, Bloomsbury, where he advertised as a Watch Escapement and Chronometer Maker in the Trade Directories.

His obituary in the Horological Journal of 1863 noted that he was "...one of the oldest manufacturers in the trade. He was deservedly in high repute for the excellence of his productions, and his name stood at the top in America". He was also especially noted for duplex escapements.

== Family ==
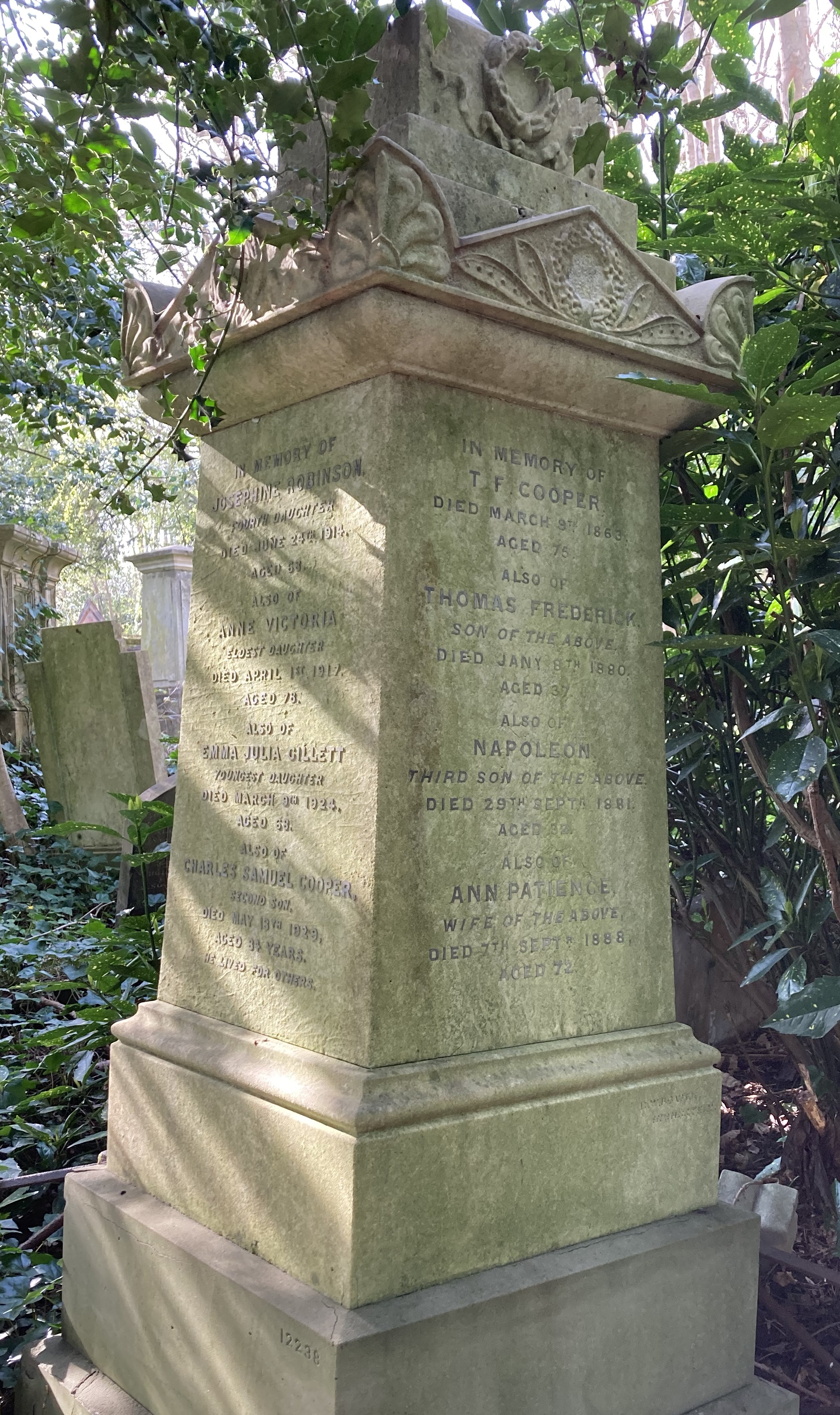
Cooper family monument, Highgate Cemetery

Cooper married Ann Patience Layton in 1836 and they had nine children including:

Thomas Frederick (1842–1880), who continued his father's business. After his death it was discovered that, to cover debts incurred by unsuccessful financial speculations and without the family's knowledge or agreement, he had mortgaged much of its assets.

Charles Samuel Cooper, became a watchmaker at Camberwell

Napoleon Cooper, who became a commercial traveller

Josephine, who successfully sued an architect's clerk, Frederick Albery, for breach of promise after courting her when he had already been engaged for three years to marry another woman. When he failed to pay the £150 fine, plus costs, the Cooper family successfully bankrupted him.

== Death ==
Cooper died at home in Calthorpe Street on 9 March 1863, leaving an estate valued for probate at approaching £12,000, equivalent to £1,450,299 in 2023. His widow Ann Patience Cooper and unmarried daughter Anne Victoria Cooper were two of his executors. He was buried in a family grave on the west side of Highgate Cemetery.
