= Bertie Cooper =

Australian rules footballer

Personal information
- Full name: Bertie Frederick Cooper
- Born: 3 April 1892 (baptism); Fremantle, Western Australia, Australia
- Died: 31 August 1916 (aged 24); Mouquet Farm, Pozières, France

Playing career^{1}
| Years | Club | Games (Goals) |
| 1910–1915 | South Fremantle | 83 |
- ^{1} Playing statistics correct to the end of 1915.

Bertie Frederick Cooper (baptised 3 April 1892 – 31 August 1916) was an Australian rules footballer who played 83 games for the South Fremantle Football Club in the West Australian Football League between 1910 and 1915, captaining the team in 1913 and 1915.

Cooper was baptised 3 April 1892 in Fremantle, Western Australia, the son of George and Emma Cooper. In 1915, Cooper joined the 16th Battalion of the Australian Imperial Force and was killed on 31 August 1916 during the Battle of Mouquet Farm in Pozières, France. He is honoured at the Australian National Memorial in Villers-Bretonneux Cemetery.
