= Henry Cooper (disambiguation) =

Henry Cooper (1934–2011) was a British heavyweight boxer.

Henry Cooper may also refer to:

== Politics ==
- Henry Cooper (Tennessee politician) (1827–1884), U.S. senator from Tennessee
- Henry Allen Cooper (1850–1931), U.S. representative from Wisconsin
- Henry E. Cooper (1857–1929), Hawaiian politician
- Henry Reed Cooper (1940–2023), Liberian judge
- Henry Sloane Cooper (1888–1970), Canadian businessman and politician

== Sports ==
- Henry C. Cooper (1913–?), Australian boxer
- Henry Cooper (footballer) (born 1989), Costa Rican footballer
- Henry Cooper (Northern Districts cricketer) (born 1993), New Zealand cricketer

== Other ==
- Henry Cooper (VC) (1825–1893), English recipient of the Victoria Cross
- Henry Cooper (bishop) (1845–1916), Australian Anglican bishop
- Henry Alexander Cooper (1853–1899), billed by P. T. Barnum as "The Tallest Man in the World"
- Henry Cooper (educator) (1909–1990), New Zealand educator and sportsman
- Henry S. F. Cooper Jr. (1933–2016), writer and environmentalist
- Henry St. John Cooper (1869–1926), English writer
- Henry St. John Cooper, one of the pen names of English writer John Creasey (1908–1973)
- Sir Henry Cooper School, a secondary school in Kingston upon Hull, England

== See also ==
- Harry Cooper (disambiguation)
- Henry Cowper (disambiguation)
