= Select Committee on the Promulgation of the Statutes =

United Kingdom House of Commons select committee

- Formation: 2 November 1796
- Dissolved: 5 December 1796
- Purpose: To consider the most effectual Means of promulgating the Statutes of the Realm; and to report the same, with their Observations, to the House
- Chair: Charles Abbot MP
- Key people: See § membership
- Parent organization: House of Commons
- Website: Report

The Select Committee on the Promulgation of the Statutes was a select committee of the House of Commons of the Parliament of the United Kingdom appointed in 1796 to consider the promulgation of the statutes of the United Kingdom.

The work of the committee led to the distinction of public general acts, local acts and private acts.

== Background ==
In the United Kingdom, acts of Parliament remain in force until expressly repealed. Blackstone's Commentaries on the Laws of England, published in the late 18th-century, raised questions about the system and structure of the common law and the poor drafting and disorder of the existing statute book.

On 12 April 1796, the Select Committee on Temporary Laws, Expired or Expiring was appointed to inspect and consider temporary laws, expired or expiring. The committee reported on 12 May 1796, resolving that it was "highly expedient for the honour of the nation and the benefit of all His Majesty's subjects that a complete and authoritative edition of all the statutes should be published", and publishing a Register of Expiring Laws and a Register of Expired Laws.

== Establishment ==
On 2 November 1876, the House of Commons resolved to appoint a select committee to "consider the most effectual Means of promulgating the Statutes of the Realm; and to report the same, with their Observations, to the House". The committee was instructed to take into consideration the report of the Select Committee on Temporary Laws, Expired or Expiring dated 12 May 1796, as relates to the committee's observations and recommendations on promulgation.

=== Membership ===
The committee was appointed on 2 November 1796, consisting of 11 members with a quorum of five and the power to "send for persons, papers, and records".

Name	Commentary
Charles Abbot MP	Chair
Sir Richard Arden MP	Master of the Rolls
Robert Dundas MP	Lord Advocate
Serjeant James Adair MP	
Sir William Scott MP	
Thomas Powys MP	
William Mainwaring MP	
Thomas Berney Bramston MP	
Henry Bankes MP	
Hon. Henry Hobart MP	
Isaac Hawkins Browne MP	

The committee was also assisted by the King's Printer, Andrew Strahan MP, and Henry Cowper, the clerk assistant of the House of Lords.

== Report ==
The committee first met on 3 November 1796. The committee reported on 5 December 1796.

The committee addressed the mode of promulgation, remarking that "the only mode in which the statutes are now promulgated is the publication of them by the King's Printer. Your committee have not been able to discover at what precise period of time the statutes of the realm were first printed by public authority, but it appears that the ancient mode of promulgating them by the sheriff's proclamation fell into disuse very soon after the introduction of the art of printing." The committee observed that the statutes printed by the King's Printer at the end of each session were collected into volumes, consisting of all public acts and local and personal acts made public by a special clause (except Turnpike Acts). They noted that promulgation was limited to around 1,100 volumes annually, distributed to members of each house of parliament, the privy council and some of the great offices of state.

The committee recommended that "expedition in promulgating public statutes must ever be an important object of attention" and criticised the considerable financial cost and bulk of the statute book.

The committee noted that, in the annual volume of the statutes, local acts declared to be public (for example drainage, bridges, churches, canals etc.) occupying more than double the space of more important public general acts, even when taking into account the practice of the King's Printer of excluding Turnpike Acts. Therefore, the committee recommended excluding all local acts, abstracts and repetitions of titles from the Collection of Public Acts.

This would allow for distribution of volumes of reduced size to increase from 1,100 to 3,500, at the same cost as before, allowing for copies to be promulgated to more courts of England and Wales and courts of Scotland, deposit libraries, the four Inns of Court, English and Scottish universities, the Register Office for Scotland, the sheriffs of the 85 counties, the 106 commissions of the peace, the Chief Magistrate or head officer of each city, borough, town corporate etc., resident justices of the peace of the 56 counties, ridings or divisions, and the 17 inferior jurisdictions, of England and Wales and each of the 32 counties and single stewartry of Scotland, and other custos rotulorum.

The committee recommended promulgating the public local acts to all public bodies and officers of state, each house of Parliament, every department, the courts of England and Wales, the courts of Scotland and other deposit libraries/repositories.

The committee recommend promulgating the private acts to the house of parliament, recognising the volume and cost of wider distribution.

The committee laid down requirements which every bill ought to be introduced, emphasising the importance prompt and regular printing, of punctuation, numbered sections, marginal notes and stating precisely the duration of temporary acts and commencement dates. The report also gave some curious instances of errors of typography and punctuation.

The committee also published as an appendix documents collected in proof of facts they "thought necessary to ascertain" and preserve.

== Legacy ==
The work of the committee, as well as the Select Committee on Temporary Laws, Expired or Expiring, drew attention to the unsatisfactory state of the statute book. On 20 March 1797, the House of Commons resolved itself into a committee of the whole house, resolving:

- To authorise and direct His Majesty's Printer to print at least 3,550 copies of every public general act, 200 copies of every public local act (including Road Acts) and 200 copies of every private act.
- To authorise and direct His Majesty's Printer to print and distribute these public local acts and private acts according to a certain mode of distribution. (Note: The exact distribution of the public general acts was included in the Journals of the House of Lords.)
- That every Chief Magistrate, and Head Officers, of any City, Borough, or Town Corporate, in England and Wales, and of every Royal Burgh in Scotland, and every Sheriff, Clerk of the Peace, and Town Clerk, receiving any such copies should preserve and pass down said copies to their successors.
- To authorise and direct His Majesty's Printer to print and distribute 3,550 copies of every new public general statute as soon as possible following royal assent according to a certain mode of distribution. (Note: The exact distribution of the public general acts was included in the Journals of the House of Lords.)
- That any parties requiring copies of private acts from the Clerk of Parliament or the House of Lords should do so at their own expense on the first printing.
- To authorise and direct His Majesty's Printer to class acts as public, local, and private acts in separate title volumes, numbered separately with one general table of all the acts passed in that session.
- That the precise duration of every new temporary law should be expressed in the title of the bill, in a distinct clause at the end of the bill and nowhere else.
- That all expired or expiring acts proposed to be revived or continued should be included in one bill, which should express in its title that it is "reviving, or for continuing, the several Statutes therein mentioned" and should include in its title every statute by year, chapter and day of passing, with precise duration.

On 27 April 1797, the resolutions of the committee were considered again, and the House ordered that the resolutions be communicated to the House of Lords at a conference. A committee was appointed to manage the conference, met on 1 May 1797, consisting of 10 members of parliament, and 8 peers.

Name	Commentary
Sir Richard Arden MP	Master of the Rolls, Commons Manager
Charles Abbot MP	
John Scott MP	Attorney General
Sir John Mitford MP	Solicitor General
Robert Dundas MP	Lord Advocate
Serjeant James Adair MP	
Sir William Scott MP	
Henry Bankes MP	
Isaac Hawkins Browne MP	
William Mainwaring MP	
Hon. Henry Hobart MP	
Thomas Townshend, 1st Viscount Sydney	Lords Manager
Samuel Hood, 1st Viscount Hood	
Henry Willoughby, 5th Baron Middleton	
Thomas de Grey, 2nd Baron Walsingham	
Charles Cocks, 1st Baron Somers	
William Eden, 1st Baron Auckland	
William Lyttelton, 1st Baron Lyttelton	
Assheton Curzon, 1st Viscount Curzon	

On 2 June 1797, the resolution was agreed to by the House of Lords, with a humble address delivered on 7 June 1797. The message was presented by the Lord President of the Council, John Pitt, 2nd Earl of Chatham, and Thomas Townshend, 1st Viscount Sydney, James Stopford, 3rd Earl of Courtown, Lord Charles Henry Somerset, Dudley Ryder MP and the Master of the Rolls, Sir Richard Arden MP, to the King on 15 June 1797, who issued immediate directions.

Following the resolution that "His Majesty's Printer should also be authorized to class the general and the special statutes (viz. the public, local, and private acts) of each session in separate volumes, and to number the chapters of each volume, together with a general table of all the acts passed in that session", the King's Printer adopted the classification for acts passed from the next session (38 Geo. 3) onwards. This led to the distinction now recognised between public general acts, local and personal acts and private acts.

On 17 November 1797, the resolutions of the committee in relation to temporary laws and expired or expiring acts were made standing orders of the House of Commons.

On 22 December 1797, the House of Commons amended the resolutions of the committee, providing that the promulgation of private acts would extend only to private acts in which a clause was inserted expressing that, at the request of persons interested, the act is declared to be a public act. This was considered and agreed to by the House of Lords on 29 December 1797, and the resolution was referred to the Committee appointed to Consider the Promulgation of the Statutes.

On 4 January 1798, the copy fee for private acts was set to 1s, with different fees for private bills depending on their stage.

In 1814, the classification of statutes was changed to include public general acts, local and personal acts declared to be public and to be judicially noticed, private acts printed by the King's Printer, copies of which may be given in evidence and private acts not printed.

In 1806, the Commission on Public Records passed a resolution requesting the production of a report on the best mode of reducing the volume of the statute book. From 1810 to 1825, The Statutes of the Realm was published, providing for the first time the authoritative collection of acts.

== See also ==
- Statute Law Revision Act
