= Allotment (gardening) =

Plot of land made available for individual, non-commercial gardening

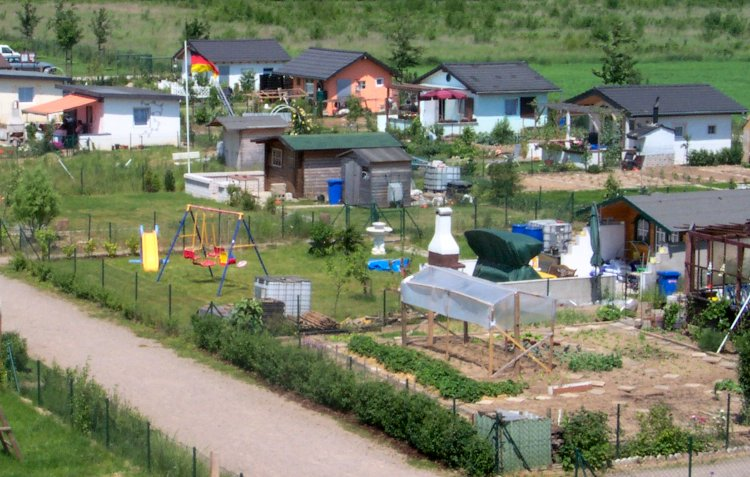
Allotments in Germany

An allotment is a plot of land made available for individual, non-commercial gardening for growing food plants, so forming a kitchen garden away from the residence of the user. Such plots are formed by subdividing a piece of land into a few or up to several hundred parcels that are assigned to individuals or families, in contrast to a community garden, where the entire area is tended collectively by a group of people. The term "victory garden" is also still sometimes used, especially when a garden dates back to the First or Second World War.

The individual size of a parcel typically suits the needs of a family, and often the plots include a shed for tools and shelter, and sometimes a hut for seasonal or weekend accommodation. The individual gardeners are usually organised in an allotment association, which leases or is granted the land from an owner who may be a public, private or ecclesiastical entity, and who usually stipulates that it be only used for gardening (i.e., growing vegetables, fruits and flowers), but not for permanent residential purposes (as is usually also required by zoning laws). The gardeners must pay a small membership fee to the association and abide by the corresponding constitution and by-laws. However, the membership entitles them to certain democratic rights.

== Socio-cultural and economic functions ==
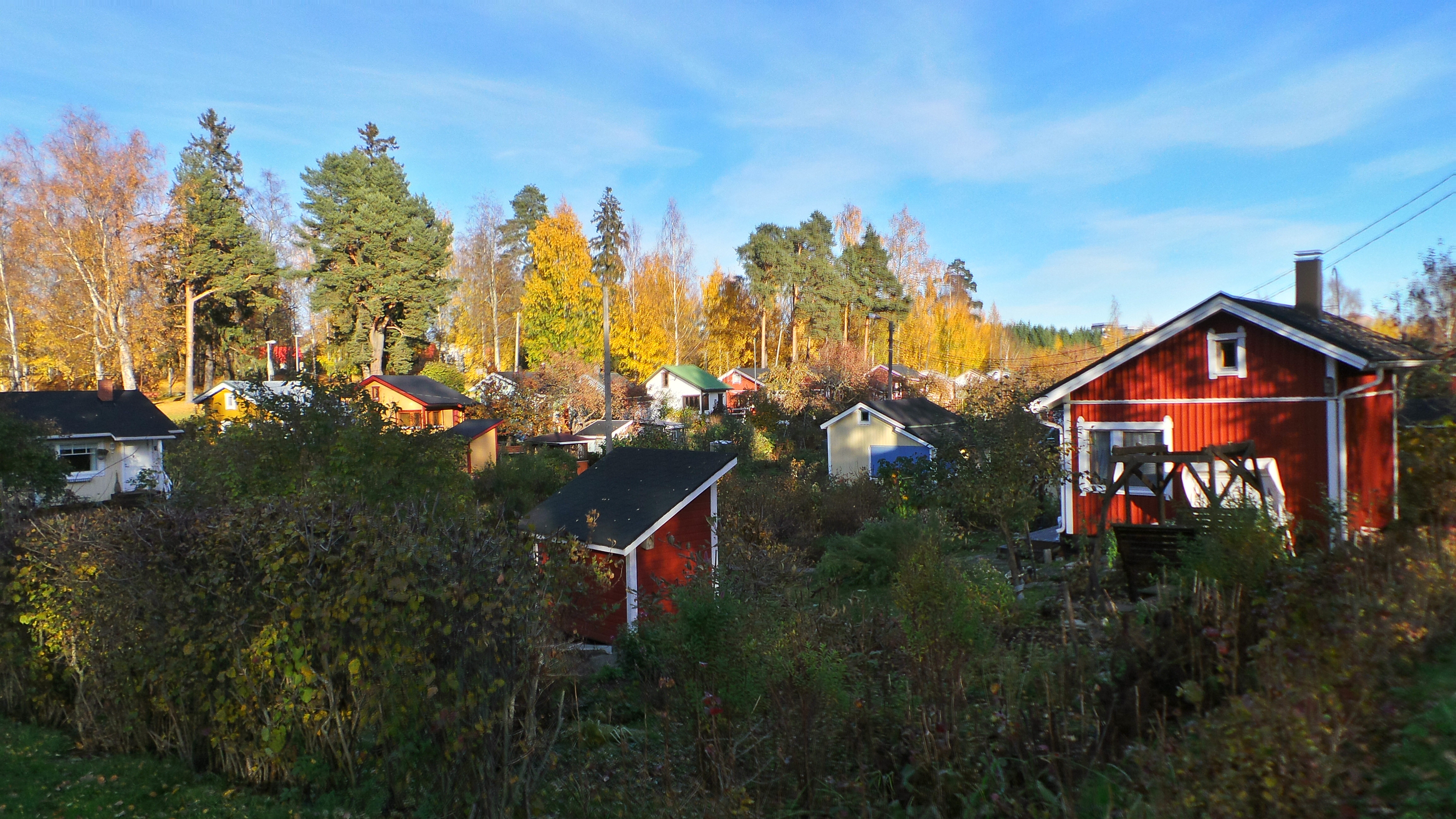
An allotment garden in Petsamo, Tampere, Finland

The Luxembourg-based Office International du Coin de Terre et des Jardins Familiaux, representing three million European allotment gardeners since 1926, describes the socio-cultural and economic functions of allotment gardens as offering an improved quality of life, an enjoyable and profitable hobby, relaxation, and contact with nature. For children, gardens offer places to play and to learn about nature, while for the unemployed, they offer a feeling of doing something useful as well as low-cost food. For the elderly and disabled, gardens offer an opportunity to meet people, to share in activity with like-minded people, and to experience activities like planting and harvesting.

== By country ==
=== Austria ===
The first garden was started in Purkersdorf in 1905.

=== Canada ===
In cities like Vancouver, Toronto, Calgary, Montreal, and Ottawa, these are called community gardens.

=== Czechia and Slovakia ===
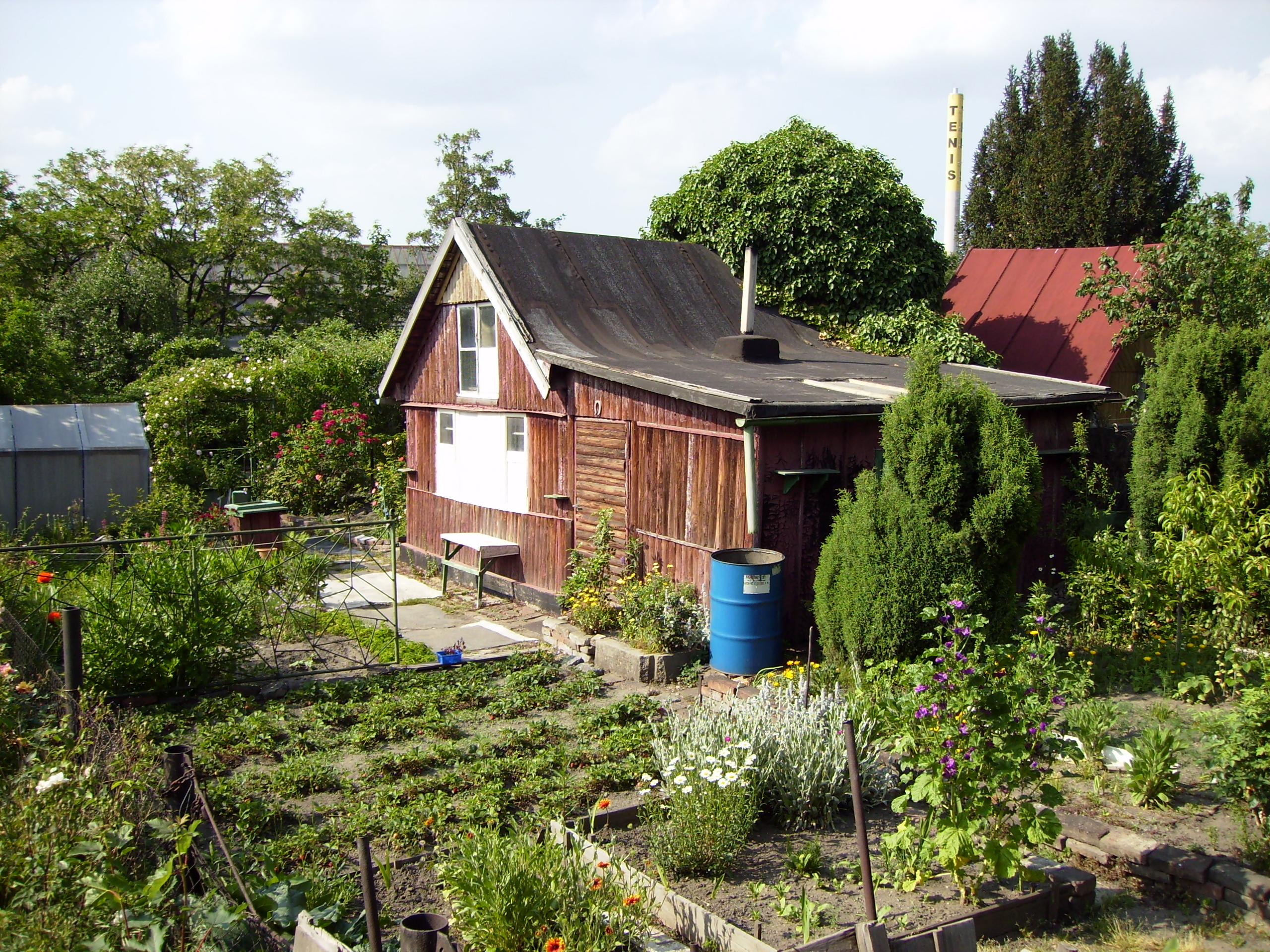
Allotment plot, Prague, Czech Republic

Allotment gardening used to be widely popular in the former Czechoslovakia under the communist regime. It gave people from suburban prefab apartment blocks – called paneláky in Czech – a chance to escape from city chaos, pollution, and concrete architecture. Holiday houses and gardens served also as the only permitted form of investment of savings for common middle-class citizens.

=== Denmark ===
In 1778, land was laid out outside the fortifications of the town of Fredericia for allotment gardens, and, according to an 1828 circular from the royal chancellery allotment, gardens were established in several towns.

Private initiative formed the first Danish allotment association in Aalborg in 1884, and in Copenhagen an association named Arbejdernes Værn (lit. 'The Workers' Protection') founded the first allotment gardens of the Danish Capital in 1891. Since then, allotment gardens have spread to most Danish towns.

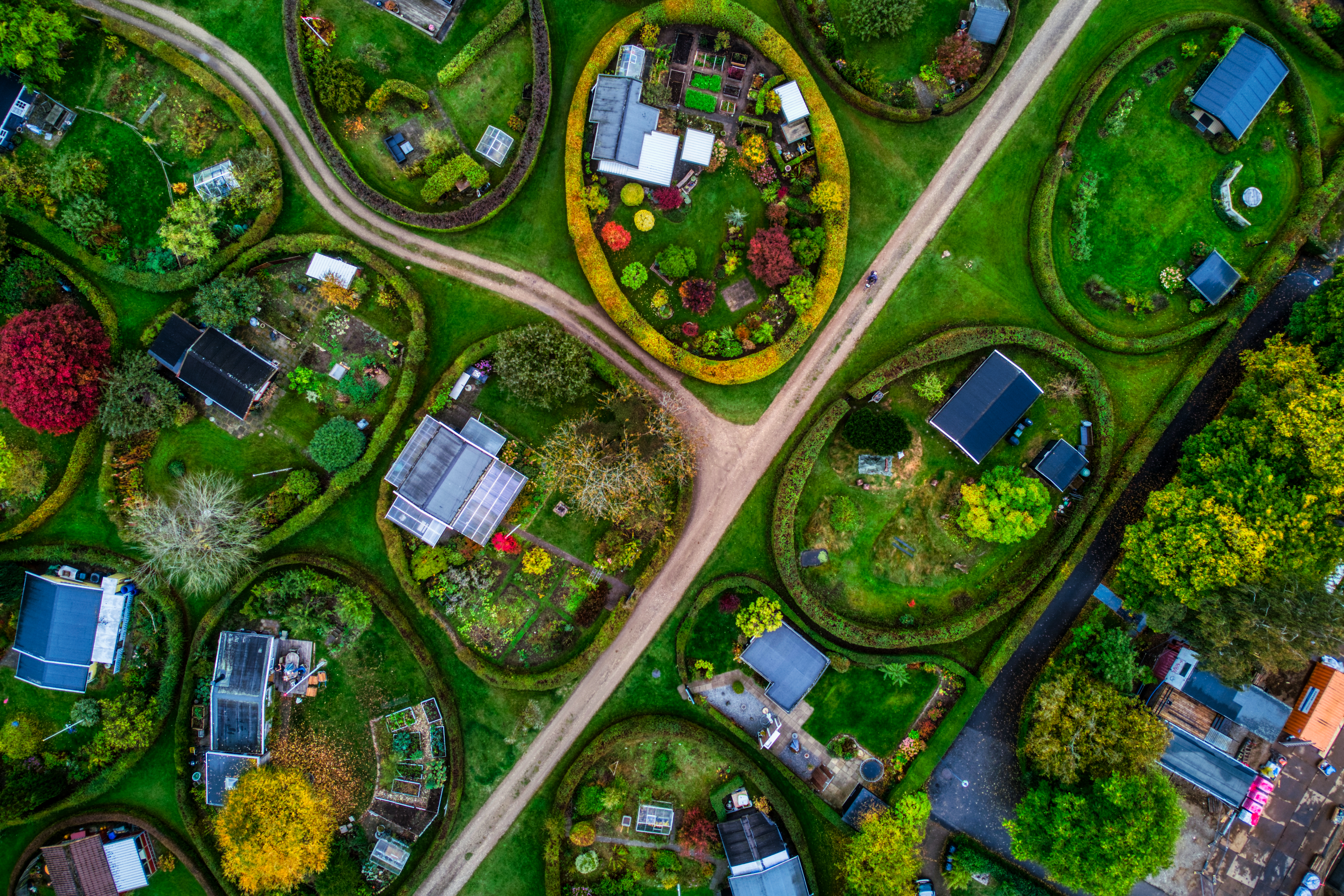
The Oval Allotment Gardens, Nærum, Denmark

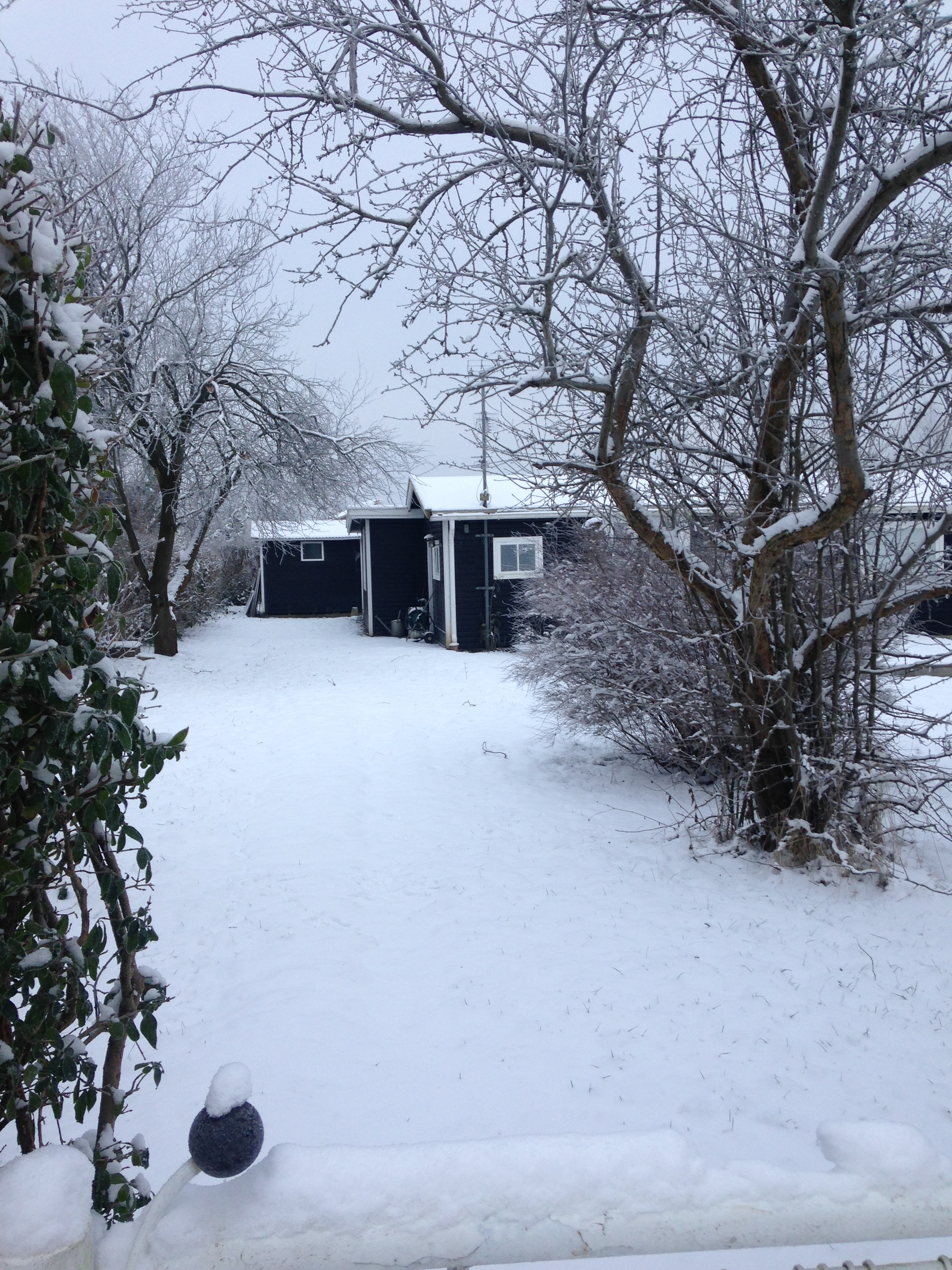
Kolonihave in winter, Skovlunde, Denmark

In 1904, there were about 20,000 allotment gardens in Denmark. 6,000 of them were in Copenhagen. During the interwar years, the number of allotment gardens grew rapidly. In 2001, the number of allotment gardens was estimated to be about 62,120.

In 1908, twenty allotment associations in Copenhagen formed the Allotment Garden Union, which in 1914 was expanded to cover all of Denmark. The Allotment Garden Federation was founded to negotiate more favourable deals with the state and the municipalities from which the allotments associations rented the land. Today, the federation represents roughly 400 allotment associations in 75 municipalities.

The Danish tradition for allotment gardens later spread to the other Nordic countries: first Sweden, then Norway and Finland.

Today, most allotment gardens are on land owned by the municipality, which rents the land to an allotment association. The association in turn gives each member a plot of land. To preserve allotment gardens as something that is available for all kinds of people, the membership charge is set significantly below what a market price would be. Since allotments are often placed on attractive plots of land, this has led to huge waiting lists for membership in many allotment associations.

Although the main purpose of the allotment is gardening, most allotment gardens have a pavilion built in them. These pavilions can range in size from an old rebuilt railway car to a small summer house. Many people grow so fond of their allotment gardens that they live there the entire summer. In most cases, however, members are not allowed to live there the entire year.

=== Finland ===
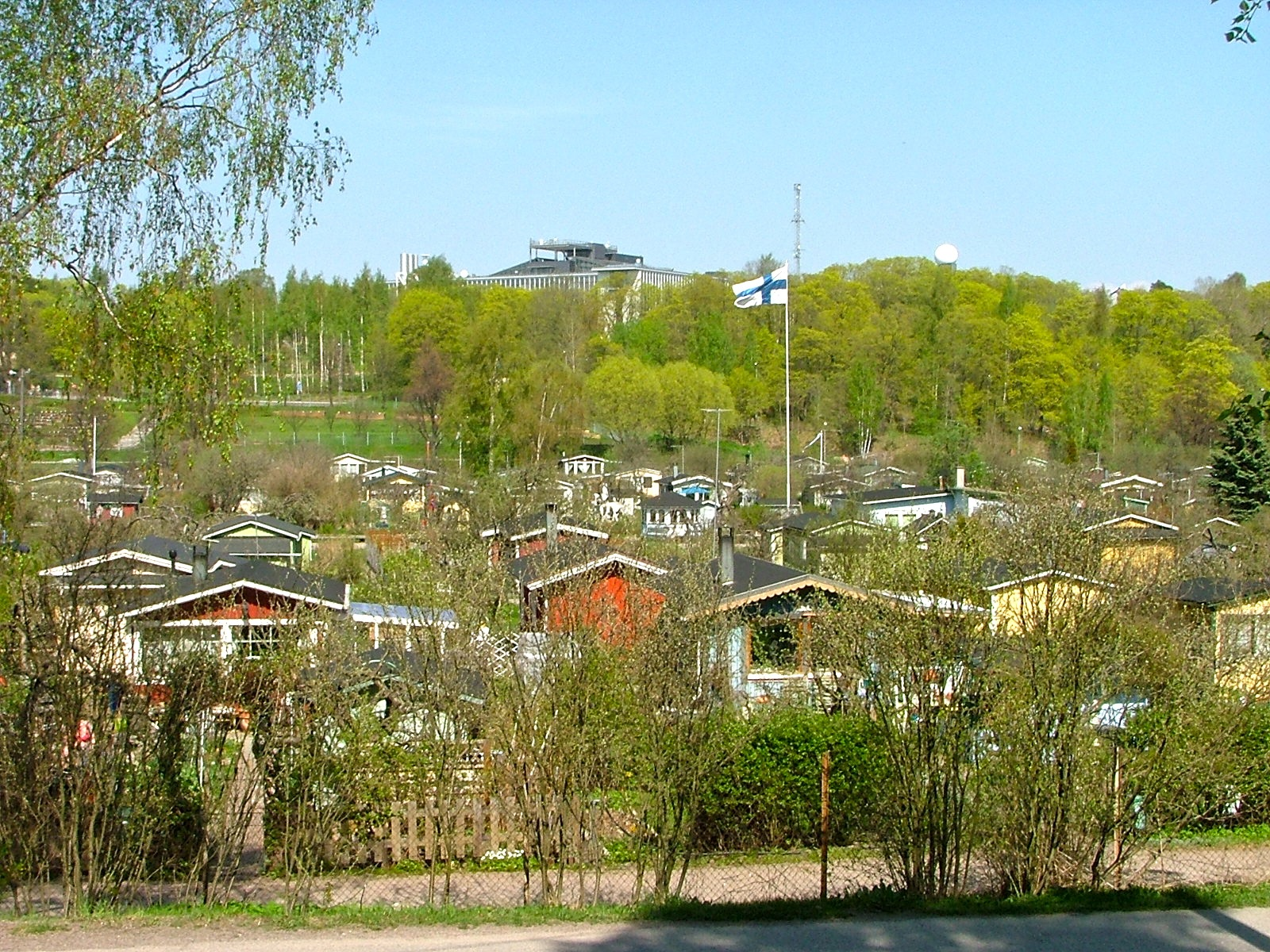
Allotment gardens in Vallila, only 2–3 km from central Helsinki. Each allotment contains a summer-cottage-type building.

The Federation of Finnish Allotment Gardens is a non-profit organisation that supports allotment gardeners and connects them to allotments and each other. The first allotment garden was established 1916 in Tampere, and today there are about 30 allotment associations all around Finland made up of roughly 3700 allotmenteers.

=== France ===
Family gardens, or allotments, which appeared at the end of the 19th century, are plots of land made available to inhabitants by municipalities. These plots, most often allocated to vegetable gardening, were initially intended to improve the living conditions of the workers by providing them with social balance and food self-sufficiency.

Today, they are enjoying renewed interest by helping to create “green oases” near cities, which are useful in the face of the threat of global warming. They also respond to current concerns to produce vegetables locally by low-income categories of the population and participate in creating "social ties" in urbanised areas. Created in February 2007, the National Council of Collective and Family Gardens (CNJCF) aims to encourage and promote their development, the protection of plant heritage and biodiversity, gardening that respects the environment and defends its positions with public authorities and other institutions. The CNJCF today federates nearly 135,000 members, making up the three founding associations: the National Horticultural Society of France (SNHF), the National Federation of Family and Collective Gardens (FNJFC)15 and the Garden of the Railwayman (Jardinot).

=== Germany ===
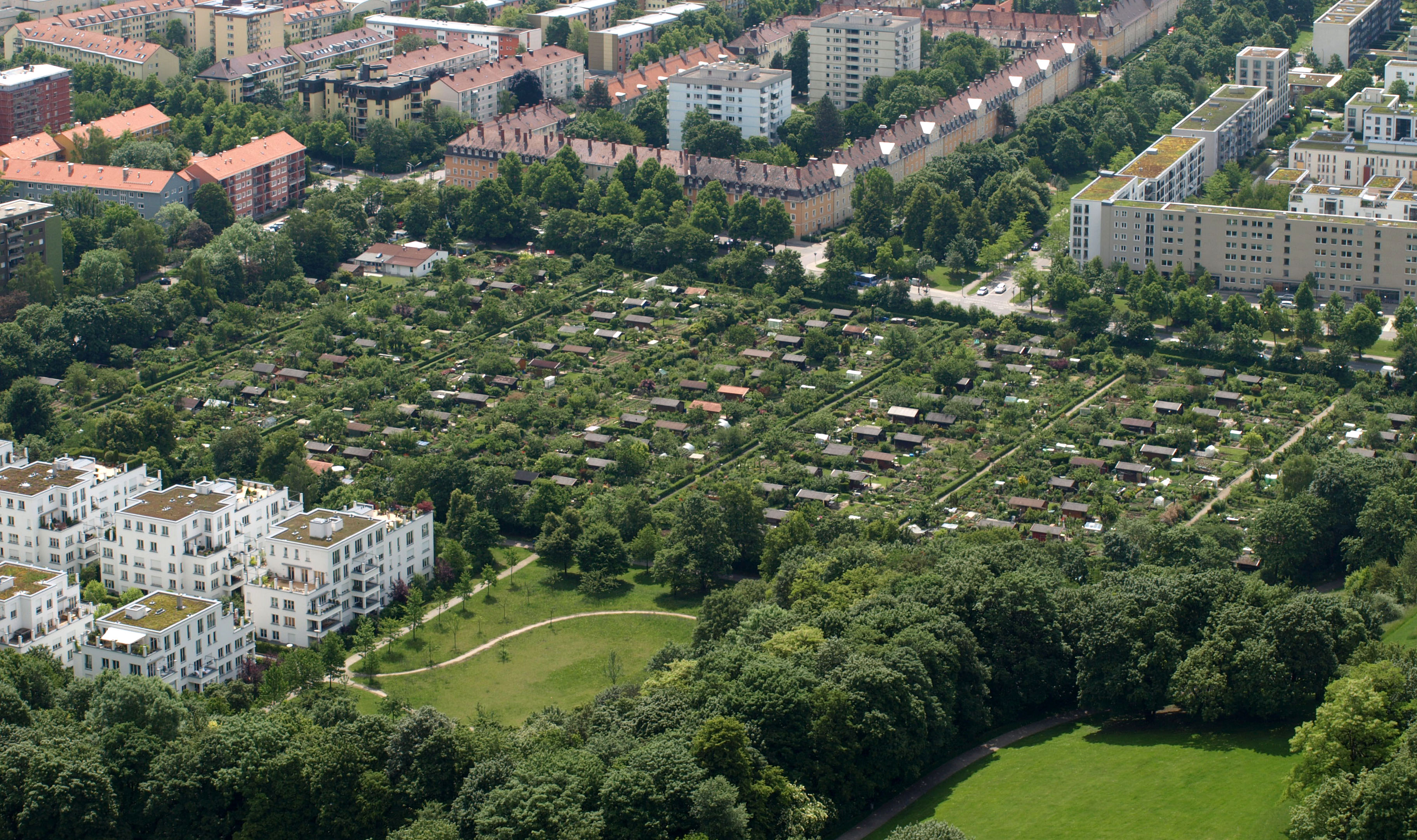
Allotments in Schwabing, Munich

The history of the allotment gardens in Germany is closely connected with the period of industrialisation and urbanisation in Europe during the 19th century, when a large number of people migrated from the rural areas to the cities to find employment and a better life. Very often, these families were living under extremely poor conditions, suffering from inappropriate housing, malnutrition and other forms of social neglect. To improve their overall situation and to allow them to grow their own food, the city administrations, the churches or their employers provided open spaces for garden purposes. These were initially called the "gardens of the poor".

The idea of organised allotment gardening reached a first peak after 1864, when the so-called " Schreber Movement", named after local doctor Moritz Schreber, started in the city of Leipzig in Saxony. A public initiative decided to lease areas within the city, to give children a healthy and close-to-nature environment to play in. Later, these areas included actual gardens for children, but soon adults tended towards taking over and cultivating these gardens. This kind of gardening also became popular in other European countries, especially Germanic countries such as Austria (and its dependencies), the Netherlands and Switzerland. In German-speaking countries, allotment gardens are accordingly generally known as Schrebergärten (singular: Schrebergarten), sometimes literally translated as "Schreber gardens". Another common term is Kleingärten ('small gardens', singular: Kleingarten).

The aspect of food security provided by allotment gardens became particularly evident during World Wars I and II. The socio-economic situation was very miserable, particularly regarding the nutritional status of urban residents. Many cities were isolated from their rural hinterlands and agricultural products did not reach the city markets anymore or were sold at very high prices on the black market. Consequently, food production within the city, especially fruit and vegetable production in home gardens and allotment gardens, became essential for survival. The importance of allotment gardens for food security was so obvious that in 1919, one year after the end of World War I, the first legislation for allotment gardening in Germany was passed. The so-called "Small Garden and Small-Rent Land Law", provided security in land tenure and fixed leasing fees. In 1983, this law was amended by the Federal Allotment Gardens Act (Bundeskleingartengesetz). Today, there are still about 1.4 million allotment gardens in Germany, covering an area of 470 km^{2} (180 sq mi). In Berlin alone, there are 833 allotment garden complexes.

=== Malta ===
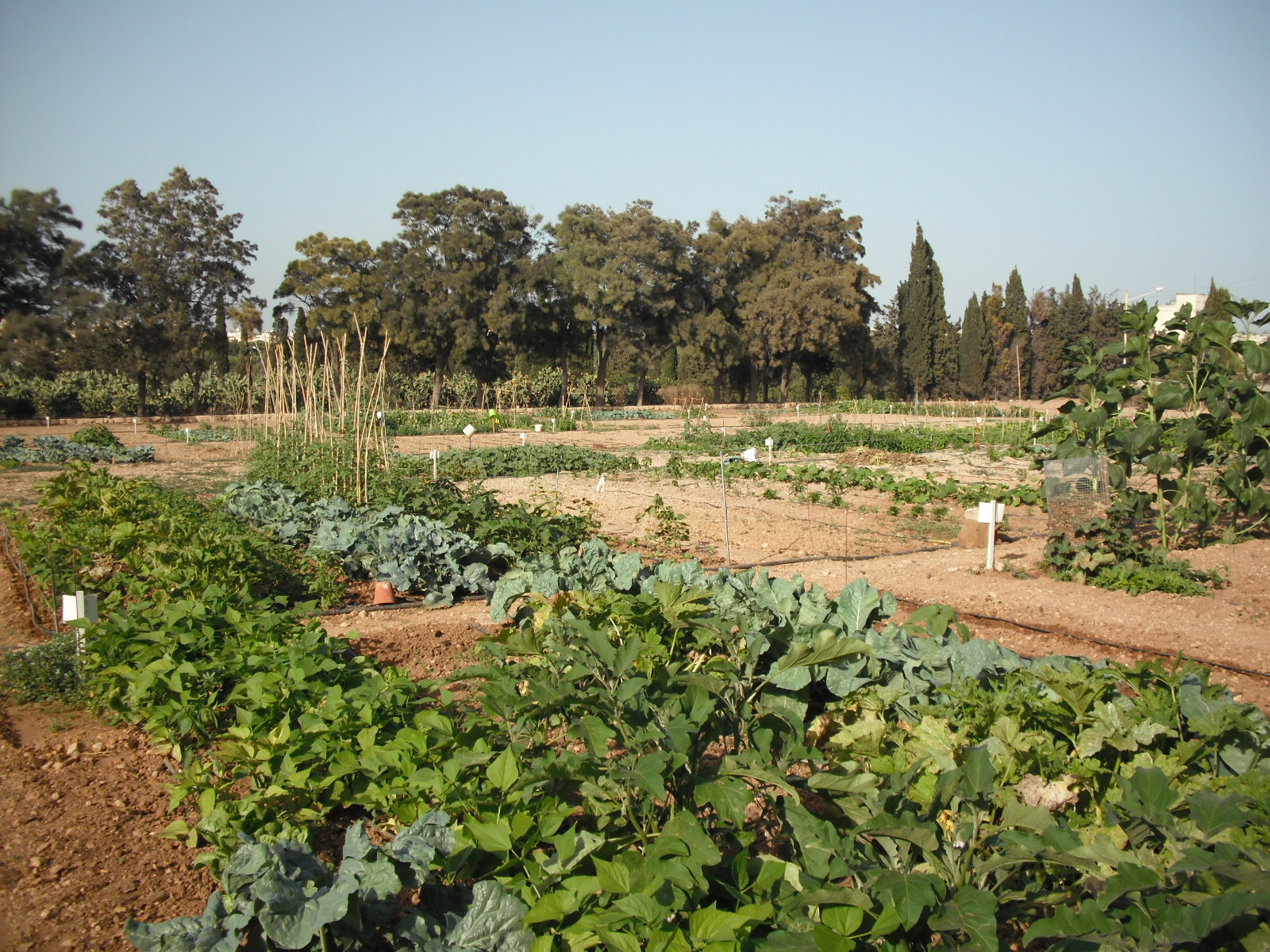
Allotments at Għammieri, Malta

Malta introduced its first allotment gardens in April 2011. The objective of the scheme, which was called Midd Idejk fil-Biedja ('Try Your Hand at Farming'), was to encourage people, especially the young and those living in urban areas, to take up organic farming. The scheme had over 50 allotment plots located at Għammieri, Malta, with each plot measuring 50 square metres in size. All plots were fully irrigated and those who participated in the scheme received continual support and training. Malta's allotment gardens were terminated in 2013, following a change in administration. In September, 2019, Heritage Malta, an agency which falls under the Ministry for Culture, started an initiative to re-introduce the concept of allotments. Located just above the Abbatija Tad-Dejr catacombs in Rabat, the new allotment plots were issued with several restrictions in an effort to protect the sensitivity of the archaeological site.

=== Netherlands ===
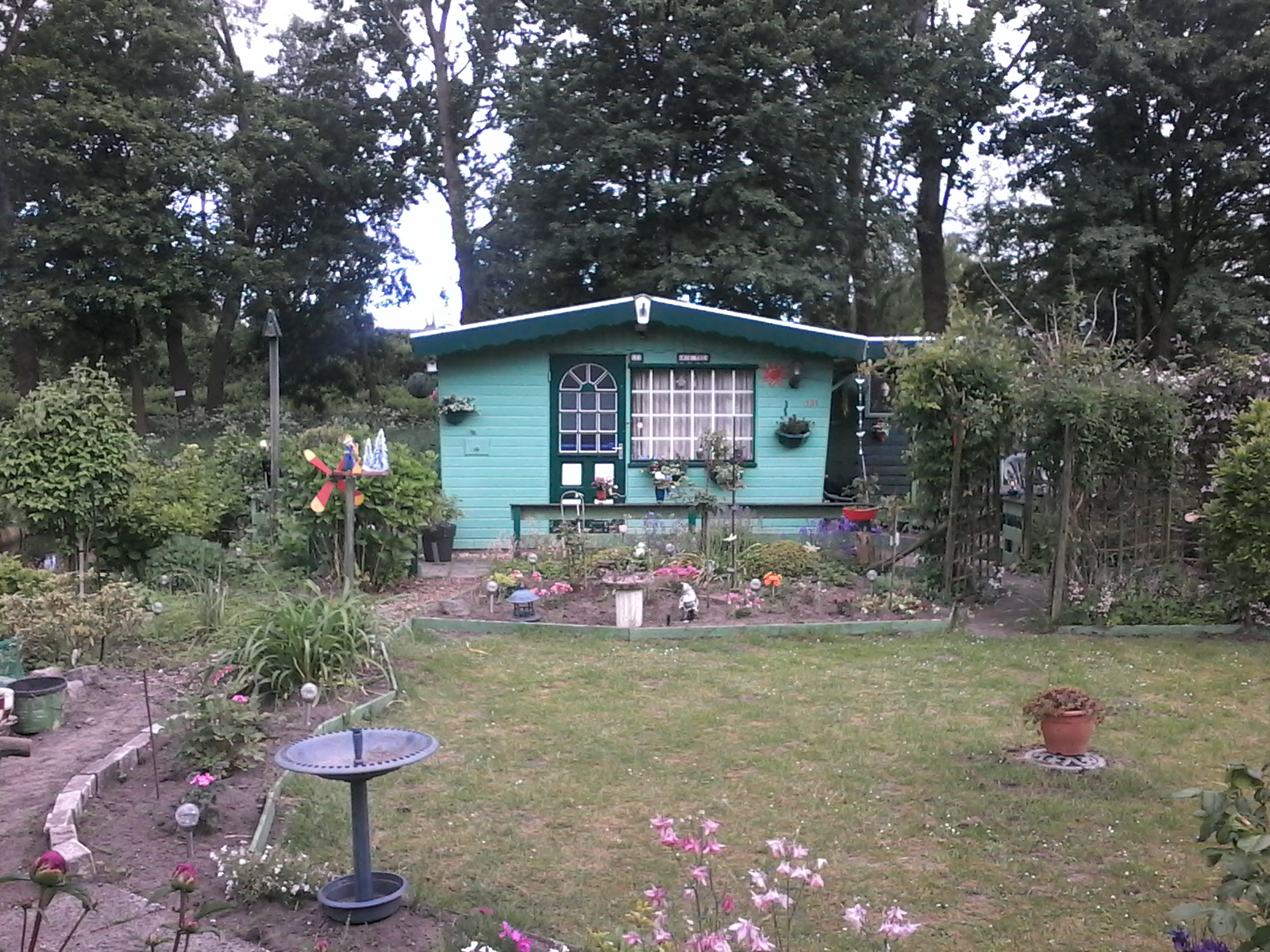
Allotment in Rotterdam

The first allotment gardens in the Netherlands were founded in 1838. In the 19th century, cities started allotment gardens for working-class families. Around the first world war, in which the Netherlands remained neutral, the users of the gardens started demanding that the gardens would be governed by the members. In 1928, the allotment garden societies founded the national level het Algemeen Verbond van Volkstuindersverenigingen in Nederland (AVVN). During the German occupation of WWII, many volkstuinen started. Until the 1950s, the gardens were primarily used for vegetable production; since then there has been a shift to recreational use. Depending on the city and society, small sheds, greenhouses or small garden houses are allowed. In some cases, permanent habitation is allowed during summertime. The Netherlands has 240,000 allotments.

=== Norway ===
There are 13 allotment gardens in Norway, with around 2000 allotments. The oldest, Rodeløkkens Kolonihager, dates to 1907. The largest, Solvang Kolonihager, has around 600 allotments and is in Oslo, close to the woods and Sognsvann lake. The allotment gardens are quite popular, and there can be a waiting list of 10 and in some cases even 20 years.

=== Philippines ===
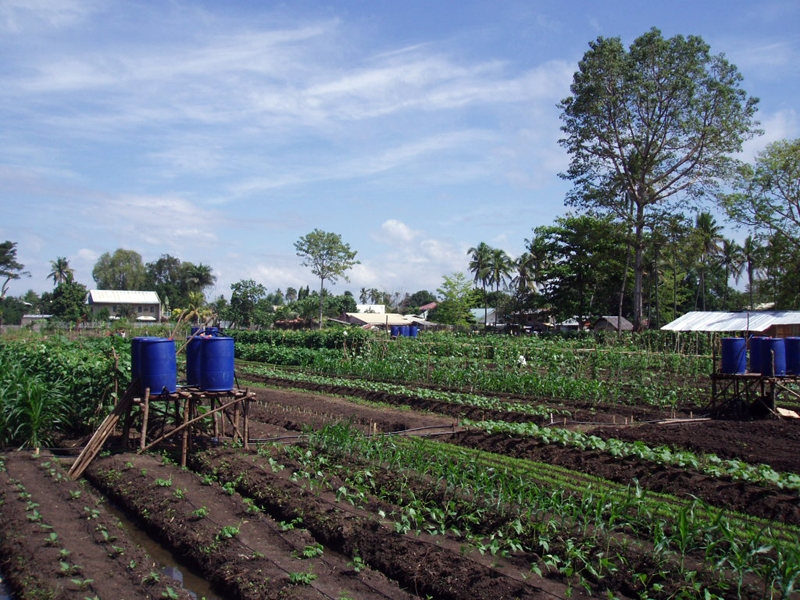
Kauswagan Allotment Garden, Cagayan de Oro

In 2003, the first allotment garden of the Philippines was established in Cagayan de Oro, Northern Mindanao as part of a European Union funded project. Meanwhile, with the assistance of the German Embassy in Manila and several private donors from Germany, this number has grown to five self-sustaining gardens located in different urban areas of the city, enabling a total of 55 urban poor families the legal access to land for food production. Further four allotment gardens, two of them within the premises of public elementary schools are presently being set up for additional 36 families using the asset-based community development approach. Some of the gardeners belong to the poorest in the city, the garbage pickers of the city's landfill site. Aside from different vegetables, the gardeners grow also herbs and tropical fruits. In some gardens, small animals are kept and fish ponds are maintained to avail the gardeners of additional protein sources for the daily dietary needs. Each allotment garden has a compost heap where biodegradable wastes from the garden as well as from the neighboring households are converted into organic fertilizer, thus contributing to the integrated solid waste management programme of the city. Further, all gardens are equipped with so-called urine-diverting ecological sanitation toilets similar to practices in Danish allotment gardens described by Bregnhøj et al. (2003).

=== Poland ===
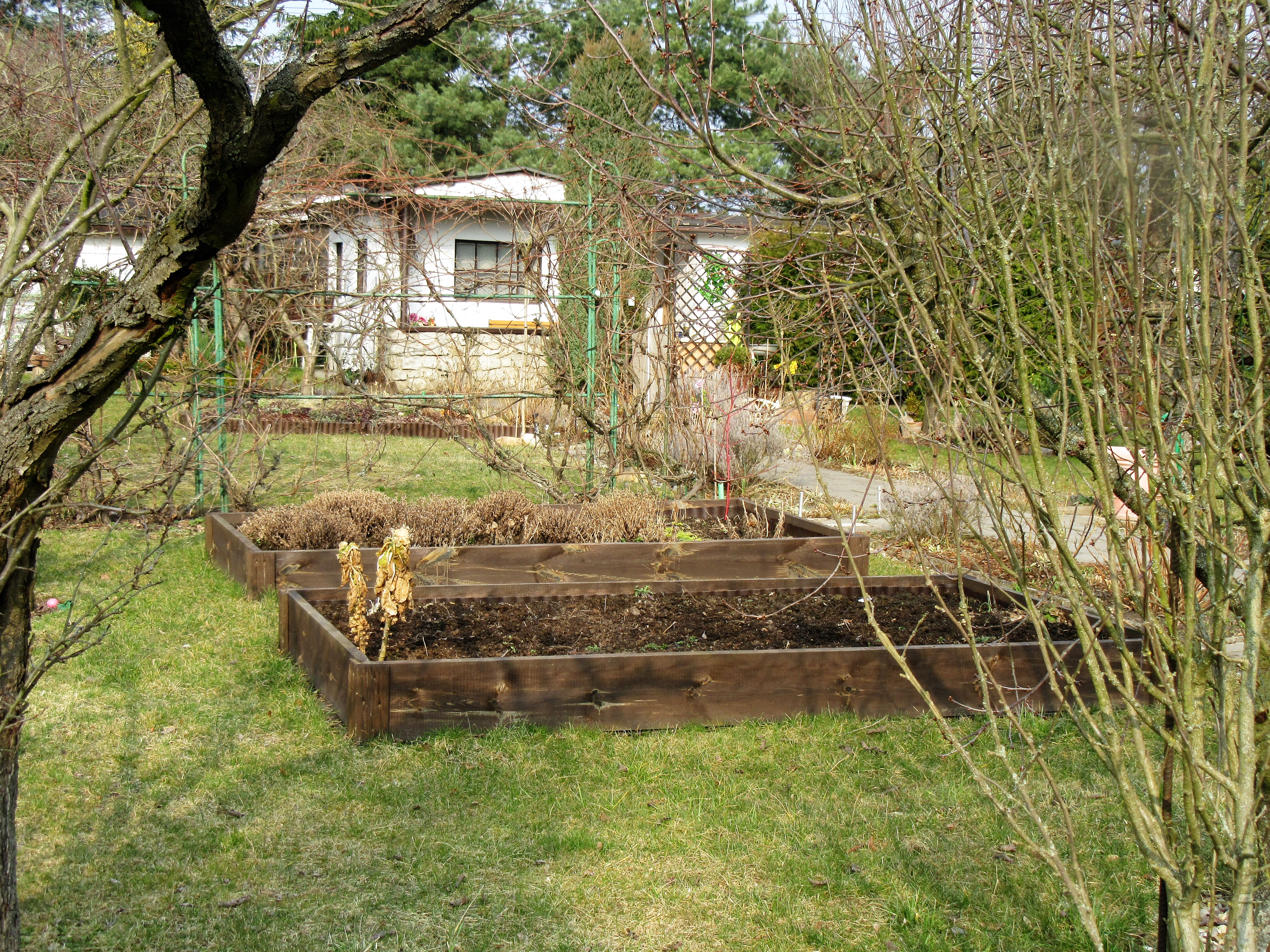
Allotment garden in Poznań, Poland

In Poland, allotment gardens date back to 1897 when Doctor Jan Jalkowski founded the 'Sun Baths' (Polish: Kąpiele słoneczne) community gardens and health area in Grudziądz, then part of the German Empire. The emergence of allotment gardens in Poland, similarly to the situation in other European countries, was linked to the industrialisation epoque. The creation of the allotments was treated as a response to food and health problems of a growing number of rural population migrating into cities. Former peasants were encouraged to reproduce their rural subsistence patterns in a new environment to increase social stability through additional food provision, creation of green spaces, and exercise. The organisers opted that the gardens should first and foremost meet the needs of the poorest.

The role of allotment gardens did not change significantly in the twentieth century. During the Communist regime allotment gardeners were mostly focused on improving the household budget by producing food for family needs. In the late 1980s, food expenses comprised 40% of the household budget. It was also during that time when spending time at the allotment gardens (Polish: działkowanie) became a cultural phenomenon.

With the collapse of Communism and the arrival of Capitalism, the function and main purpose of the allotment gardens were redefined. In 2013 the regulator characterised their primary role as to satisfy recreational and other social needs – food security was only mentioned among the latter.

Currently, there are 965,000 registered allotment gardeners in Poland. Allotment gardeners, who cultivate publicly owned urban space, constitute the largest group of city land managers in the country. The transition from the predominantly productive character of the allotments to the pleasure gardens that has been observed in Poland is the combined result of market trends, current aesthetic needs, pressure from allotment administrators, and city developers willing to adopt these attractive green spaces. Progressive urbanisation is threatening the existence of allotment gardens especially those located in city centres, the other threat is an idea of turning allotments into public open spaces, which would most probably transform them into parks.

In the past years, the interest in allotment gardens has been rising again, mostly around younger people who see their environmental, community building, and leisure potential.

=== Portugal ===
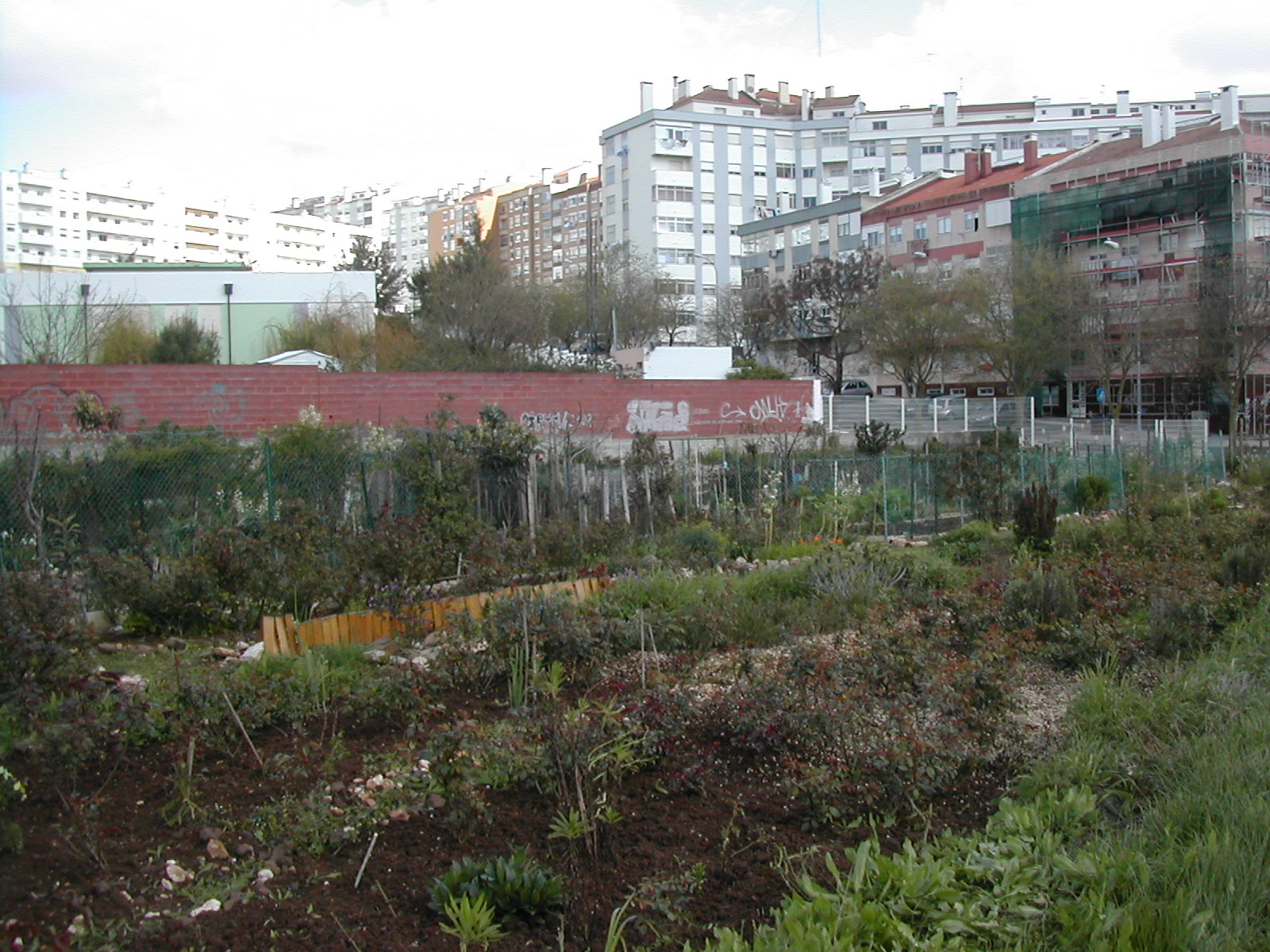
Allotments on the outskirts of Lisbon

Since 2011, the municipality of Lisbon has created more than 19 allotment gardens (parques hortícolas or hortas urbanas). These are granted to residents by means of a public application process.

Otherwise, allotment gardens in Portugal are often precarious, as land is spontaneously divided into strips as cities grow.

=== Russia ===
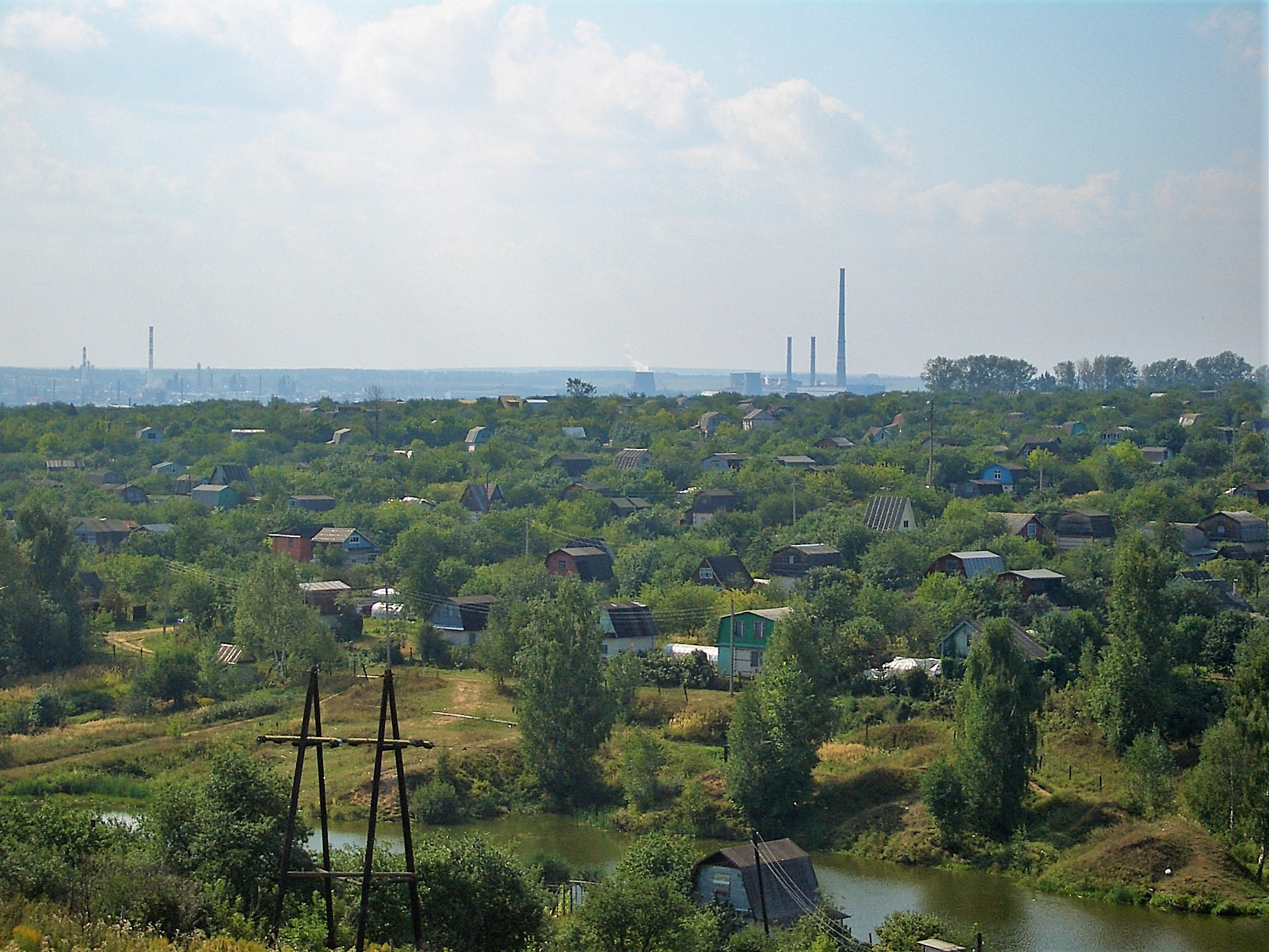
Russian allotments (dacha), Nizhny Novgorod Oblast, Russia

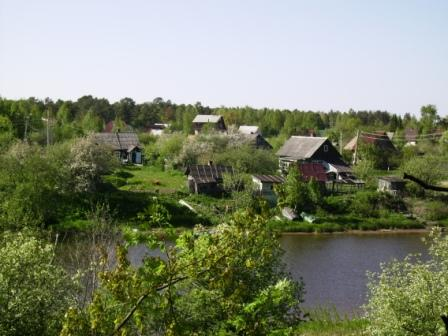
Allotments at Sista-Palkino, Lomonosovsky District, Leningrad Oblast, by the Sista river

The first allotments ("dachas") in Russia began to appear during the reign of Peter the Great. Initially they were small estates in the country, which were given to loyal vassals by the Tsar. In archaic Russian, the word dacha (да́ча) means something given.

During the Age of Enlightenment, Russian aristocracy used their allotments for social and cultural gatherings, which were usually accompanied by masquerade balls and fireworks displays. The Industrial Revolution brought about a rapid growth in the urban population, and urban residents increasingly desired to escape the heavily polluted cities, at least temporarily. By the end of the 19th century, the allotment became a favourite summer retreat for the upper and middle classes of Russian society.

After the Bolshevik revolution of 1917, most dachas were nationalised. Some were converted into vacation homes for the working class, while others, usually of better quality, were distributed among the prominent functionaries of the Communist Party and the newly emerged cultural and scientific elite. All but a few allotments remained the property of the state and the right to use them was usually revoked when a dacha occupant was dismissed or fell out of favour with the rulers of the state. Joseph Stalin's favourite Dacha was in Gagra, Abkhazia. The construction of new dachas was restricted until the late 1940s and required the special approval of the Communist Party leadership.

The period after World War II saw a moderate growth in dacha development. Since there was no actual law banning the construction of dachas, squatters began occupying unused plots of land near cities and towns, some building sheds, huts, and more prominent dwellings that served as dachas. This practice of squatting was spurred by the desire of urban dwellers, all living in multi-story apartment buildings, to spend some time close to nature, and also to grow their own fruits and vegetables. The latter was caused by the failure of the centrally planned Soviet agricultural programme to supply enough fresh produce. As time passed, the number of squatters grew geometrically and the government had no choice but to officially recognise their right to amateur farming. The 1955 legislation introduced a new type of legal entity into the Soviet juridical system, a so-called "gardeners' partnership" (садоводческое товарищество; not to be confused with community garden). The gardeners' partnerships received the right to permanent use of land exclusively for agricultural purposes and permission to connect to public electrical and water supply networks. In 1958, yet another form of organisation was introduced, a "cooperative for dacha construction (DSK)" (дачно-строительный кооператив), which recognised the right of an individual to build a small house on the land leased from the government.

The 1980s saw the peak of the dacha boom, with virtually every affluent family in the country having a dacha of their own or spending weekends and holidays at friends' dachas. Often ill-equipped and without indoor plumbing, dachas were nevertheless the ultimate solution for millions of Russian working-class families to having an inexpensive summer retreat. Having a piece of land also offered an opportunity for city dwellers to indulge themselves in growing their own fruits and vegetables. To this day, May Day holidays remain a feature of Russian life allowing urban residents a long weekend to plant seeds and tend fruit trees as the ground defrosts from the long Russian winter. Since there are no other national holidays that are long enough for planting, many employers give their staff an extra day off specifically for that purpose.

The collapse of communism in the Soviet Union saw the return to private land ownership. Most dachas have since been privatised, and Russia is now the nation with the largest number of owners of second homes. The growth of living standards in recent years allowed many dacha owners to spend their discretionary income on improvements. Thus, many recently built dachas are fully equipped houses suitable for use as permanent residences. The market-oriented economy transformed the dacha into an asset, which generally reflects the prosperity of its owner and can be freely traded in the real estate market.

Due to the rapid increase in urbanisation in Russia, many village houses are currently being sold to be used as allotments. Many Russian villages now have dachniki (да́чники) as temporary residents. Some villages have been fully transformed into dacha settlements, while some older dacha settlements often look like more permanent lodgings. The advantages of purchasing a dacha in a village usually are: lower costs, greater land area, and larger distances between houses. The disadvantages may include: lower-quality utilities, less security, and typically a farther distance to travel.

=== Sweden ===
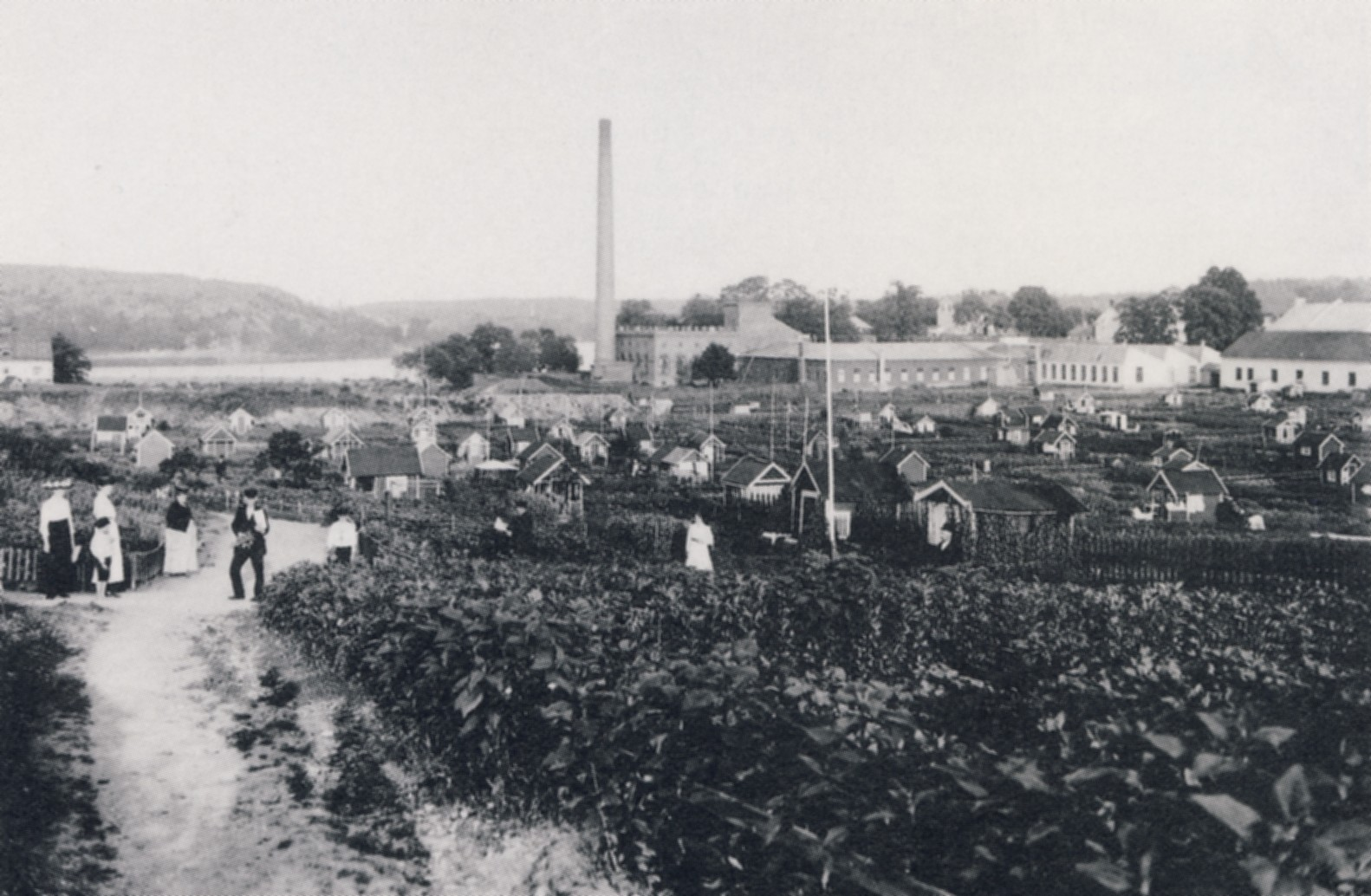
Barnängen, Stockholm allotment garden in 1915

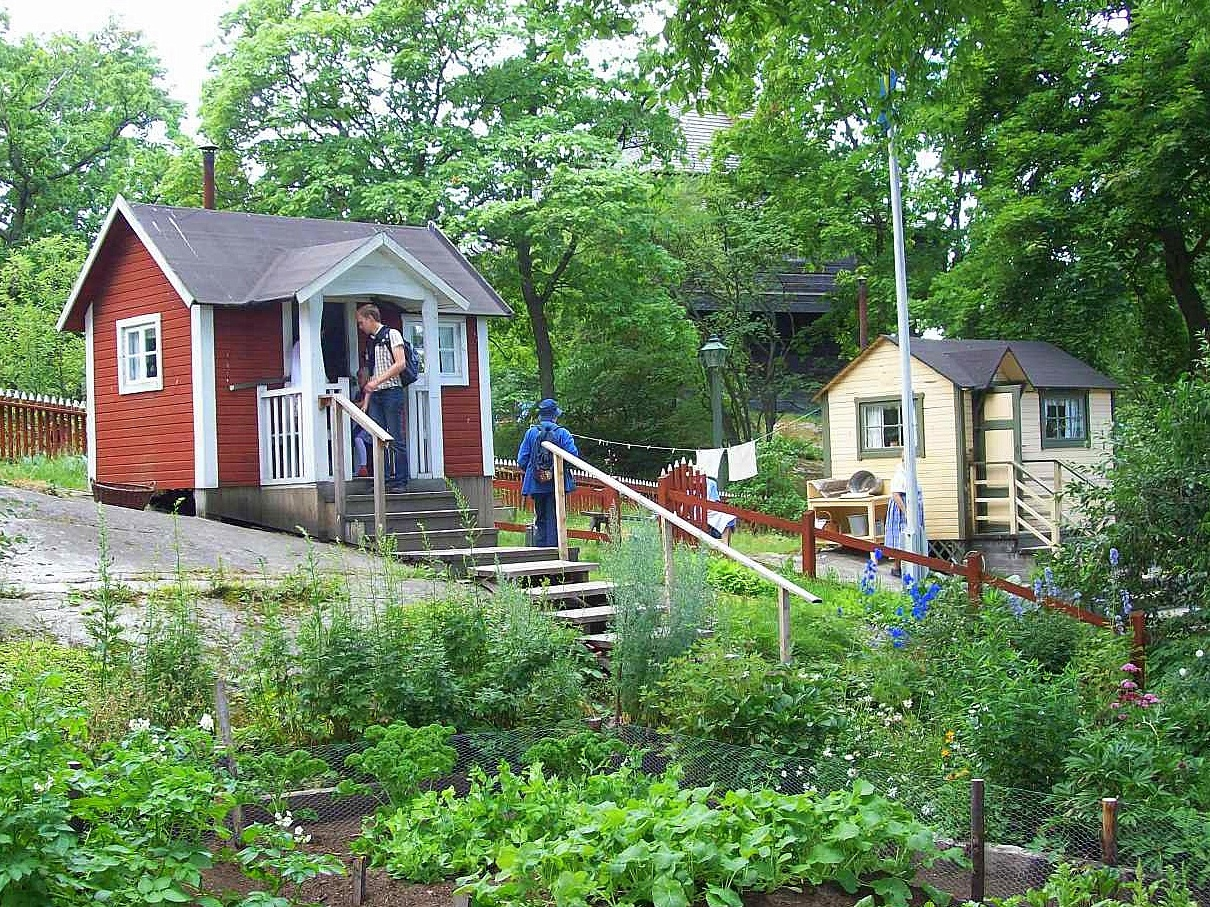
Allotment huts in the open-air museum Skansen, Stockholm

In Landskrona, around the area of the Citadel, the first allotment gardens of Sweden were made available for lease in the 1860s, later followed by those in Malmö in 1895, and Stockholm in 1904. The local authorities were inspired by Anna Lindhagen, a social-democratic leader and a woman in the upper ranks of society, who visited allotment gardens in Copenhagen and was delighted by them. In her first book on the topic devoted to the usefulness of allotment gardens she wrote:

For the family, the plot of land is a uniting bond, where all family members can meet in shared work and leisure. The family father, tired with the cramped space at home, may rejoice in taking care of his family in the open air, and feel responsible if the little plot of earth bestows a very special interest upon life.

Anna Lindhagen is said to have met Lenin when he passed through Stockholm from the exile in Switzerland on their return trip to Russia after the February Revolution in 1917. She invited him to the allotment gardens of Barnängen to show all its benefits. However, she did not win his approval. Lenin was totally unresponsive to this kind of activity. To poke in the soil was to prepare the ground for political laziness in the class struggle. The workers should not be occupied with gardening, they should rather devote themselves to the proletarian revolution.

The Swedish Federation of Leisure Gardening was founded in 1921 and represents today more than 26,000 allotment and leisure gardeners. The members are organised in about 275 local societies all over Sweden. The land is usually rented from the local authorities.

=== Turkey ===
Allotments or hobby gardens (Turkish: hobi bahçeleri) as they are known in Turkey became really popular after 2000s. A hobby garden or organic garden is an area or plot of land where vegetables and fruits can be grown. Hobby gardens, which have become very popular in recent years, offer a natural environment in city life.

Hobby gardens, which are mostly prepared by municipalities and put into service by charging annual rental fees, are now used by many people to grow vegetables and fruits and to be in touch with nature. The size of the hobby garden and the type of soil may vary depending on the region.

Hobby gardens can also be put up for sale through share deeds. In addition, in the parceling prepared, the hobby garden must be specified in the same way on the real land.

=== United Kingdom ===
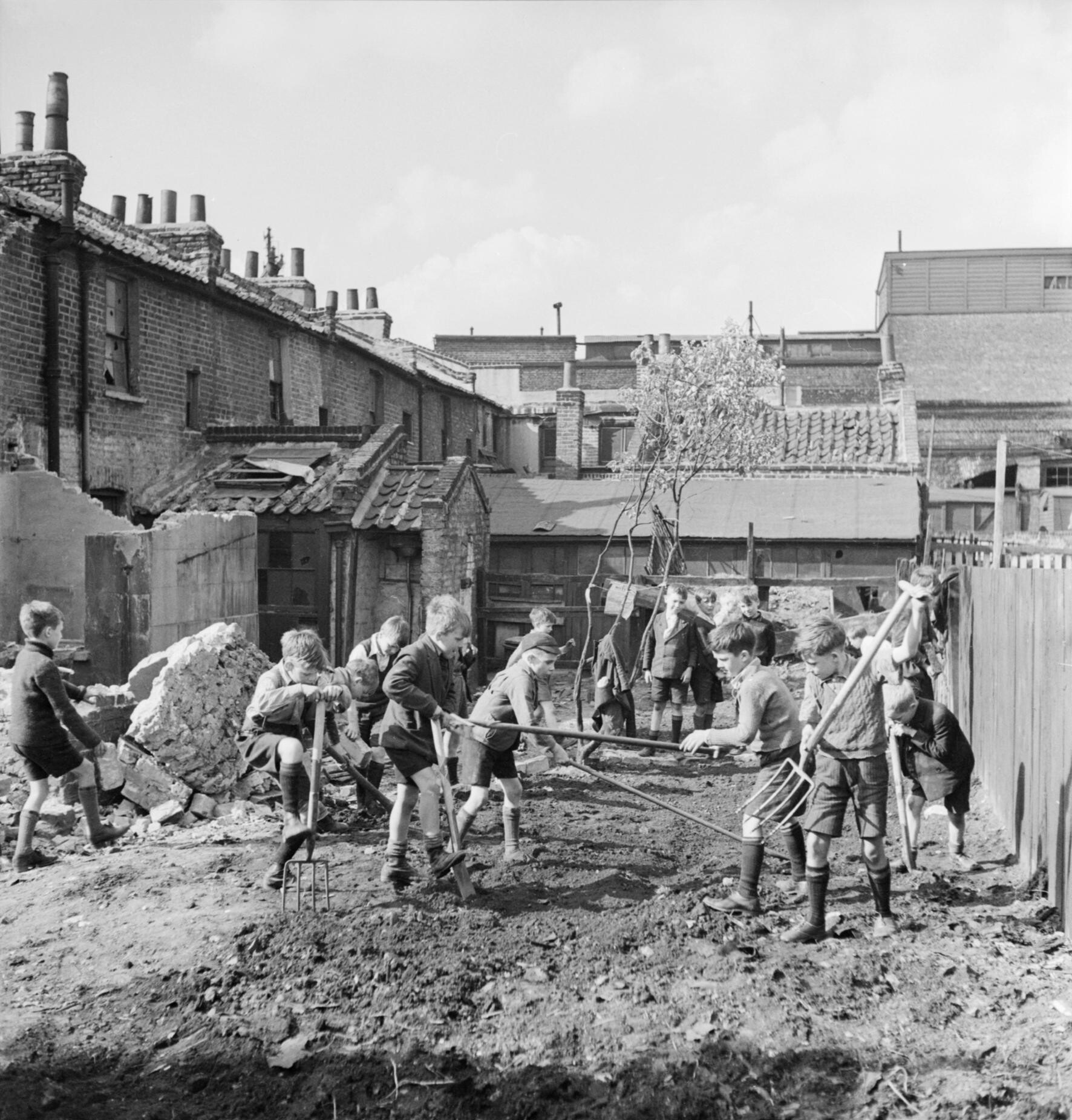
Boys creating an allotment on a bomb site in London, 1942

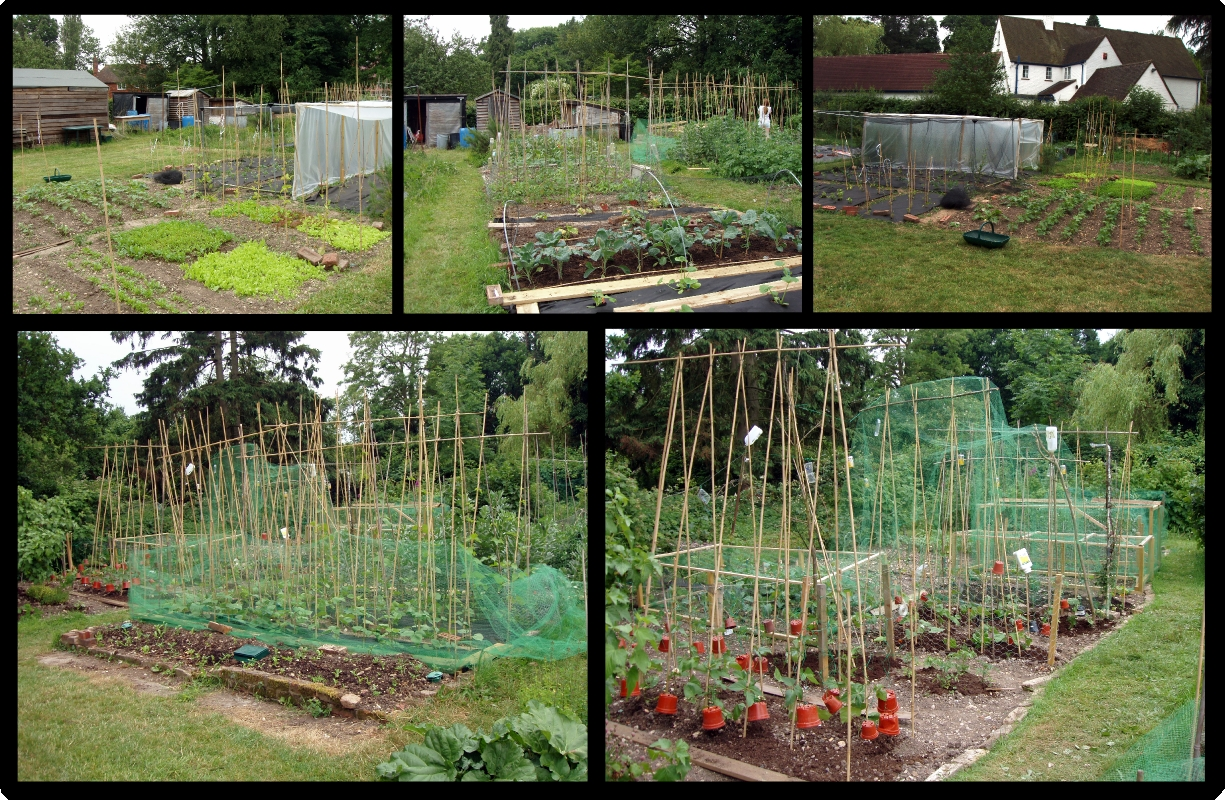
Allotments in the rural village of Jordans

UK allotment gardens near Middlesbrough, showing typical sheds and use of junk and recycled materials

A 1732 engraving of Birmingham, England, shows the town encircled by allotments, some of which still exist to this day. Another old allotment site is Great Somerford Free Gardens in the Wiltshire village of Great Somerford. These were created in 1809 following a letter to King George III from Rev Stephen Demainbray (a chaplain to the king) in which he asked the king to spare, in perpetuity, six acres from the Great Somerford Inclosure Act 1806 (46 Geo. 3. c. 63 Pr. for the benefit of the poor of his parish.

Following the inclosure acts and the Commons Act 1876 (39 & 40 Vict. c. 56), the land available for personal cultivation by the poor was greatly diminished. To fulfill the need for land, allotment legislation was enacted. The law was first fully codified in the Small Holdings and Allotments Act 1908, then modified by the Allotments Act 1922 (12 & 13 Geo. 5. c. 51) and subsequent Allotments Acts up until the Allotments Act 1950.

Under the acts, a local authority is required to maintain an "adequate provision" of land, usually a large allotment field which can then be subdivided into allotment gardens for individual residents at a low rent. Allotment sizes are often quoted in square rods, although the use of the rod has been illegal for trade purposes since 1965. The rent is set at what a person "may reasonably be expected to pay" (1950); in 1997 the average rent for a ten square rods, or 1/16 acre (250 m^{2}) plot was £22 a year. In February 2012 the UK's first Green-controlled council, Brighton and Hove, caused controversy when they stated their intention to raise the rent for a standard 250 m^{2} plot to £110 per year, with many people suggesting that this was contrary to the environmental agenda on which they were elected. Each plot cannot exceed forty square rods, i.e. 1/4 acre (1,000 m^{2}) and must be used for the production of fruit or vegetables for consumption by the plot-holder and their family (1922), or of flowers for use by the plot-holder and their family. The exact size and quality of the plots is not defined. The council has a duty to provide sufficient allotments to meet demand. The total income from allotments was £2.61 million and total expenditure was £8.44 million in 1997.

The total number of plots has varied greatly over time. In the 19th and early 20th century, the allotment system supplied much of the fresh vegetables eaten by the poor. In 1873 there were 244,268 plots and by 1918 there were around 1,500,000 plots. While numbers fell in the 1920s and 1930s, following an increase to 1,400,000 during World War II there were still around 1,117,000 plots in 1948. This number has been in decline since then, falling to 600,000 by the late 1960s and 300,000 by 2009. The Thorpe Inquiry of 1969 investigated the decline and put the causes as the decline in available land, increasing prosperity and the growth of other leisure activities.

The popular 1970s British television programme The Good Life, about a couple seeking to "escape the rat race" by becoming "totally self-sufficient" in a suburban setting, utilised an allotment to achieve their aims. Increased interest in "green" issues from the 1970s revived interest in allotment gardening, whilst the National Society of Allotment and Leisure Gardeners (NSALG), and the Scottish Allotments and Gardens Society (SAGS) in Scotland, continued to campaign on behalf of allotment users. However, the rate of decline was only slowed, falling from 530,000 plots in 1970 to 497,000 in 1977, although there was a substantial waiting list. By 1980 the surge in interest was over, and by 1997 the number of plots had fallen to around 265,000, with waiting lists of 13,000 and 44,000 vacant plots. In 2008 The Guardian reported that 330,000 people held an allotment, whilst 100,000 were on waiting lists.

In 2006, a report commissioned by the London Assembly identified that whilst demand was at an all-time high across the capital, the pressure caused by high-density building was further decreasing the amount of allotment land. The issue was given further publicity when The Guardian newspaper reported on the community campaign against the potential impact of the development for the 2012 Summer Olympics on the future of the century-old Manor Garden Allotments, Hackney Wick. In March 2008, Geoff Stokes, secretary of the NSALG, claimed that councils are failing in their duty to provide allotments. "[T]hey sold off land when demand was not so high. This will go on because developers are now building houses with much smaller gardens." The Local Government Association has issued guidance asking councils to consider requiring developers to set land aside to make up for the shortfalls in allotment plots.

Against the falling trend of land set aside for allotments is an increasing awareness of the need for cities to counter issues of food security and climate change through greater self-sufficiency. This drive to expand allotments is also a response to food price inflation, a desire to reduce food miles and surplus provision of land in post-industrial towns and cities in the developed world. Some of these themes were taken up in a recent urban agriculture project in Middlesbrough in the Tees Valley.

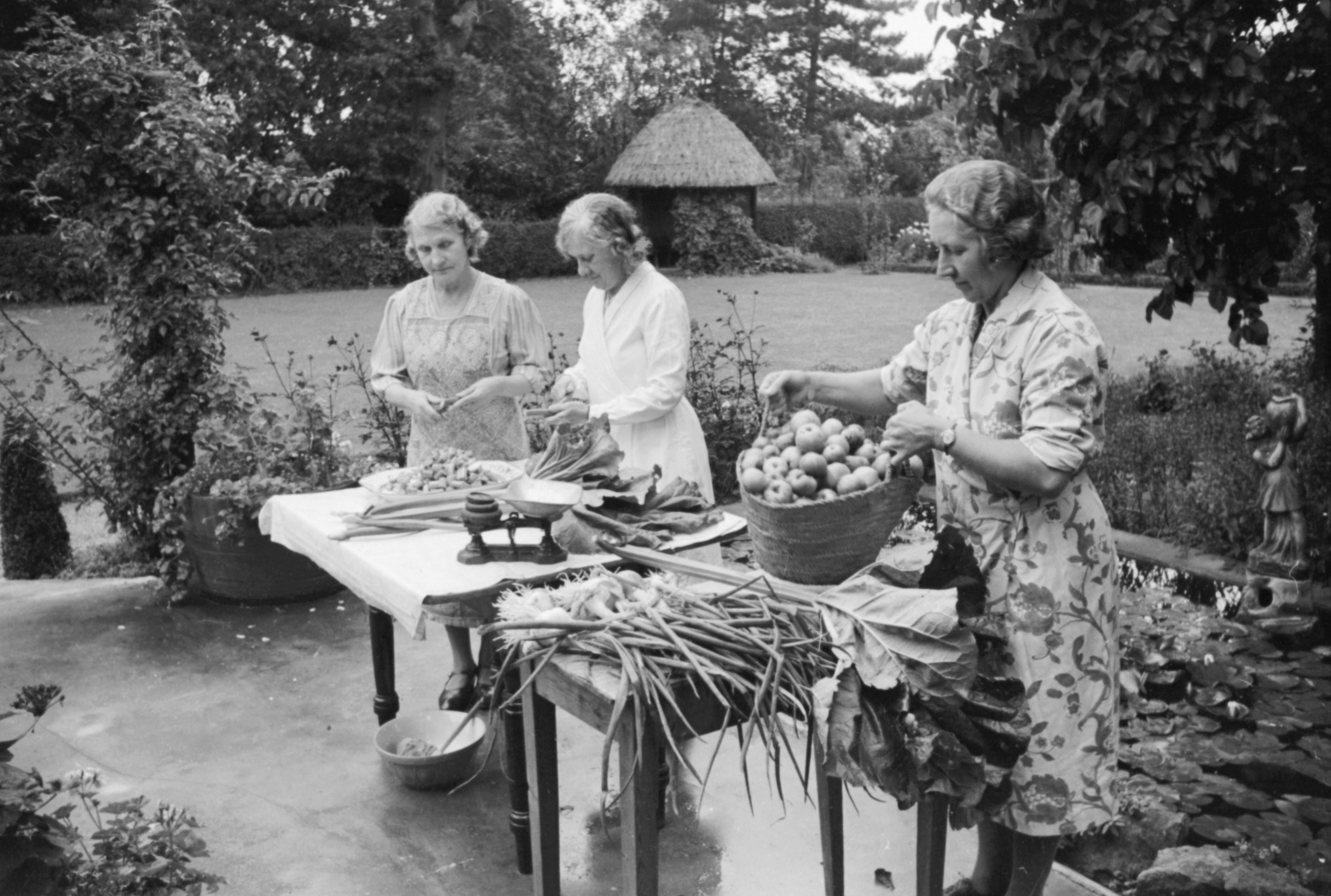
Members of Springfield Women's Institute (WI) in Essex make chutney at a table set up in the garden of the rectory, August 1941. D4273

The gendered origins of allotment spaces has been the subject of research, with findings including that a lack of toilets and sanitation can be a barrier to women, with some even miscarrying on their plots.

=== United States ===
Many "community gardens" founded in the United States began as "victory gardens" in World War II, and later evolved into community gardens. Plots in these gardens are often rented out by the city, starting at plots of just 5 ft × 5 ft (1.5 m × 1.5 m). The environmental movement has increased interest in community gardening.

== See also ==
- Dacha
- Garden sharing
- Intercultural Garden
- Leisure
- Online platforms for collaborative consumption
- P-Patch
- Simple living
- Urban agriculture
- Subsistence agriculture
- Permaculture
- Smallholding
- Peach wall
