= Harry Cooper =

Harry Cooper may refer to:

- Harry Cooper (golfer) (1904–2000), American golfer
- Harry Cooper (soccer) (died 1963), also known as Buck Cooper, American soccer player
- Harry Cooper (veterinarian) (born 1944), Australian TV presenter and veterinarian
- Harry L. Cooper (1870–1935), United States Army Colonel and military aviation pioneer
- Harry Cooper, trumpeter with the Duke Ellington Orchestra
- Harry Cooper (Eagle Scout), first known African-American Eagle Scout
- Harry Cooper (pole vaulter) (born 1924), American pole vaulter, All-American for the Minnesota Golden Gophers track and field team

== See also ==
- Henry Cooper (disambiguation)
- Harold Cooper (disambiguation)
