= Henry Cowper =

Henry Cowper may refer to:

- Henry Cowper (1668–1707), MP for Horsham
- Henry Cowper (1758–1840), British lawyer
- Henry Cowper (died 1887) (1836–1887), MP for Hertfordshire

== See also ==
- Henry Cooper (disambiguation)
