= Small Holdings and Allotments Act 1908 =

Act of the Parliament of the United Kingdom

Small Holdings and Allotments Act 1908 (Note: Section 63(1).)
- Act of Parliament
- Parliament of the United Kingdom
- Long title: An Act to consolidate the enactments with respect to small holdings and allotments in England and Wales.
- Citation: 8 Edw. 7. c. 36
- Territorial extent: England and Wales (Note: Section 63(3).)

Dates
- Royal assent: 1 August 1908
- Commencement: 1 January 1909 (Note: Section 63(2).)

Other legislation
- Amends: See § Repealed enactments
- Repeals/revokes: See § Repealed enactments
- Amended by: Land Settlement (Facilities) Act 1919; Allotments Act 1922; Settled Land Act 1925; Small Holdings and Allotments Act 1926; Local Government Act 1933; Allotments Act 1950; Charities Act 1960; Crown Estate Act 1961; Public Works Loans Act 1964; Statute Law Revision Act 1964; National Loans Act 1968; Local Government Act 1972; Statute Law (Repeals) Act 1973; Statute Law (Repeals) Act 1986; Statute Law (Repeals) Act 1993; Agricultural Tenancies Act 1995; Church of England (Miscellaneous Provisions) Measure 2006

Status: Partially repealed

Text of statute as originally enacted

Revised text of statute as amended

Text of the Small Holdings and Allotments Act 1908 as in force today (including any amendments) within the United Kingdom, from legislation.gov.uk.

The Small Holdings and Allotments Act 1908 (8 Edw. 7. c. 36) is an act of the Parliament of the United Kingdom that consolidated enactments related to small holdings and allotments in England and Wales.

== Provisions ==
=== Repealed enactments ===
Section 62 of the act repealed 6 enactments, listed in the third schedule to the act.

Citation	Short title	Extent of repeal
50 & 51 Vict. c. 48	Allotments Act 1887	The whole act, except as respects subsections (4) to (8) of section three so far as they are applied by any other enactment.
53 & 54 Vict. c. 65	Allotments Act 1890	The whole act.
55 & 56 Vict. c. 31	Small Holdings Act 1892	The whole act, except so far as it relates to Scotland.
56 & 57 Vict. c. 73	Local Government Act 1894	In section six, subsections (3) and (4).
60 & 61 Vict. c. 65	Land Transfer Act 1897	Section nineteen.
7 Edw. 7. c. 54	Small Holdings and Allotments Act 1907	The whole act.

== Subsequent developments ==
Part I of the act (sections 1 to 22), which imposed duties on county councils to provide small holdings, was largely repealed by the Land Settlement (Facilities) Act 1919 (9 & 10 Geo. 5. c. 59) and the Small Holdings and Allotments Act 1926 (16 & 17 Geo. 5. c. 52). Part II (sections 23 to 37), which imposed duties on local authorities to provide allotments, remains largely in force, having been amended by the Allotments Act 1922 (12 & 13 Geo. 5. c. 51), the Allotments Act 1950 (14 Geo. 6. c. 31) , and the Local Government Act 1972, among others.

Section 51 of the act was repealed by section 1(1) of, and part VIII of schedule 1 to, the Statute Law (Repeals) Act 1973, which came into force on 18 July 1973.
