= Harold Cooper =

Harold Cooper may refer to:

- Harold More Cooper (1886–1970), Australian anthropologist
- Harold Cooper (baseball) (1923–2010), minor league baseball executive and county commissioner of Franklin County, Ohio
- Harold Cooper (American football) (1912–1972), American football player
- Harry Cooper (veterinarian) (born 1943), Australian veterinarian and television personality
- Hal Cooper (director) (1923–2014), American television director and producer
- Hal Cooper (ice hockey) (1913–1977), Canadian ice hockey player

== See also ==
- Harry Cooper (disambiguation)
