= Clerk of the peace =

Administrative judicial position

A clerk of the peace held an office in England and Wales whose responsibility was the records of the quarter sessions and the framing of presentments and indictments. They had legal training, so that they could advise justices of the peace.

== History ==
=== England and Wales ===
The office of the clerk of the peace originated in England and is lost in antiquity. It is referred to in 34 Edw. 3. c. 1 (1361) as an office occupied by a person who draws indictments, arraigns prisoners, joins issue for the Crown, enters judgments, awards their process and makes up and keeps records in respect of proceedings before justices assembled in quarter sessions to hear and determine felonies and trespasses.

Clerks of the peace were appointed for counties, ridings, divisions and other places decided by the custos rotulorum, i.e., the principal justice of the peace for the various divisions etc. They were required to be in constant attendance on the courts of quarter sessions and were accountable in the King's Bench for their indictments. They were specifically responsible to the court for the performance of their duties. This position at common law was later set down in the Custos Rotulorum Act 1545. The clerk of the peace is styled in the Year Books as Attornatus Domini Regis. This title, which designated him as the king's attorney for the area of his appointment, is interesting, since it predates that of a single attorney-general for the realm; that title first appearing in 1461.

From early times however, it seems that clerks of the peace had administrative functions apart from their legal and quasi-legal duties, especially in towns and cities. Hearth tax returns were lodged with the clerk of the peace between 1662 and 1688. Other duties included ordering the repair of bridges, levying county rates, provision of goals, and the putting down of diseased animals. When the Local Government Act 1888 created county councils, clerks of the peace became their chief executive officers. Many more additional duties had been cast upon them, e.g., main roads. In 1894 they acquired the administration of the Motor Car Act, Small Holdings Act 1892, Old Age Pensions Act and the Finance Act. In 1902 they acquired the administration of the Education Act, in 1904 the Licensing Act and in 1908 control of the procedure required by the Criminal Appeal Act. The clerk of the peace was truly the factorum generale.

After existing for more than 600 years, the office was abolished in England by section 44(1) of the Courts Act 1971 which came into effect on 1 January 1972. Meanwhile, justices of the peace were being advised in their petty sessions work by the justices' clerk (or clerk to the justices), an office which today is known as a legal adviser in the magistrates' courts.

==== The role of the clerk in 1841 ====
William Dickinson and Sir Thomas Noon Talfourd in their book, Dickinson's Guide to the Quarter Sessions and Other Sessions of the Peace provide a snapshot of the clerk's role in 1841. They described the clerk of the peace as an officer, by whatever name called, whether clerk and attorney for the Crown, clerk of the justices, or clerk of the peace, appointed to assist the justices assembled in quarter sessions, to hear and determine felonies and trespasses.

He was appointed by the custos rotulorum.

As the custos was prohibited from selling, so his appointee was forbidden to purchase this office.

He was responsible to the justices in session for the due performance of its duties.

He was required to be an able person, learned and instructed in the laws of the realm; and was to be an able and sufficient person, residing in the county, riding, division, or other place for which he was appointed.

He was to execute his office in person, or by his sufficient deputy, instructed in the laws of the realm, so that the same deputy be admitted, taken, and reputed, by the said custos rotulorum, to be sufficient and able to exercise, occupy, keep and enjoy the same office of clerkship of the peace.

===== Duration of office =====
He had an estate of freehold for life in the office, on condition of behaving well; so that he could not be dispossessed, except for misbehavior, and by a competent tribunal.

===== Duties =====
The clerk of the peace, by himself or his sufficient deputy, was required to be in constant attendance on the court of quarter sessions. He was to give notice of its being holden or adjourned; issue its processes; record its proceedings; and do all the ministerial acts necessary to give effect to its decisions. It was his duty, when prosecutors did not choose to seek professional assistance elsewhere, to draw the bills of indictment for felony at a fee of only one shilling each.

===== Fees =====
The fees of the clerk of the peace were to be ascertained, and a table expressing them approved by the court of general quarter sessions and sanctioned by the judges of the assize. Such table was to be deposited with the clerk of the peace, and an exact written or printed copy placed and kept in a conspicuous part of the room where the quarter session held.

The clerk of the peace, though appointed by the custos rotulorum, was, when so appointed, the clerk of the court of quarter sessions. In the year-books he was styled Attornatus Domini Regis; and he was therefore also so far an officer of the Crown, that the entries are made up, and the issues joined in his name, as those on the Crown side of the King's Bench were in the name of the master of the Crown office.

All writs were served upon him on behalf of the justices, as their recognized organ, and it was both usual and convenient for the court, when it directed any proceedings to be taken or defended on behalf of the county, and at its charge, to commit the conduct of the case to him, as their attorney, if duly certificated, in which case he was invested with the rights, and subject to the responsibility of an attorney acting on behalf of individual clients.

==== Town clerk ====
In cities and towns corporate there was usually an analogous officer, who performed correspondent duties, under some other title, as that of town clerk, and was generally appointed, not by the custos rotulorum, but by the body corporate of which he was an officer. Since 1836 the duties of town clerk are distinguished from those of clerk-of-the-peace in a borough.

=== The colonies ===
==== New South Wales ====
The position of clerk of the peace continued to exist in former colonies into which English law had been introduced, including New South Wales, where the first clerk of the peace (Thomas Wylde) was appointed by a general order issued by Governor Macquarie on 4 January 1817. The appointment was confirmed by the British government and confirmation was published in an order of 16 January 1819. Thomas Wylde drew a salary for the position which he continued to occupy until his death on 4 December 1821. The office of clerk of the peace then lapsed for a time.

When quarter sessions were instituted in the colony in 1823 by s.19 of the New South Wales Act 1823, Governor Brisbane appointed Frederick Garling (who had been one of the Crown solicitors since 1816) to act as clerk of the peace by an order dated 1 March 1824. Garling was appointed for the county of Cumberland and it appears that no others were appointed at that time. Garling was appointed a Crown prosecutor for Courts of Quarter Sessions in January 1830 and acted in a dual capacity until September 1837 when he resigned as a Crown prosecutor. In January 1839 he retired as clerk of the peace.

By this time the practice had arisen of appointing clerks of the peace for the various country districts where courts of quarter sessions were held. The position involved both the administrative functions necessary for the running of the court, i.e., as registrar of the court as well as that of attorney for the Crown. The Sydney Commercial Directory for 1850 lists clerks of the peace for Cumberland, Goulburn, Bathurst and Maitland. A single clerk of the peace for the whole colony, with power to appoint deputies, was first appointed in 1870. That situation remained much the same for over 100 years until 1973 when the courts of quarter sessions were abolished and the newly passed District Court Act of that year provided in section 170, 'The Clerk of the Peace has, in relation to the Court in its criminal and special jurisdiction and to proceedings in the Court in that jurisdiction the same powers, authorities, duties and functions as he had, in relation to Courts of Quarter Sessions and to proceedings in those Courts, immediately before the commencement of this Act'. The effect of this legislation effectively preserved the common law position of the clerk of the peace.

The dual function of the clerk of the peace in New South Wales, that is as registrar of the court as well as the prosecuting attorney for the Crown was recognised on 1 January 1980 when, by ministerial direction of the then attorney general, Frank Walker MLA, the title of the office became that of Solicitor for Public Prosecutions and Clerk of the Peace.

The end of the clerk of the peace in New South Wales came about on 23 December 1986 with the assent to the Criminal Procedure Act. Section 17(1) of that Act provided 'The office of Clerk of the Peace is abolished'. The registry functions of the office were taken over by a specifically appointed registrar of the District Court in its criminal jurisdiction while the prosecuting functions remained with what became the Public Prosecutions Office headed by the Solicitor for Public Prosecutions. In turn that office became that of the Director of Public Prosecutions the following year.

According to the 1987 Law Almanac of New South Wales (p.60) the position of Clerk of the Peace at the time of its abolition was held by Brian Leslie Roach and so far as is known, this was the final position of Clerk of the Peace under the English Common Law.

== United States ==
Clerks of the peace also exist in the U.S. state of Delaware, where they are primarily responsible for issuing marriage licenses, except in Kent County, whose clerk is also the Clerk of the Levy Court.
