= Land Settlement (Facilities) Act 1919 =

Act of the Parliament of the United Kingdom

Land Settlement (Facilities) Act 1919 (Note: Section 34.)
- Act of Parliament
- Parliament of the United Kingdom
- Long title: An Act to make further provision for the acquisition of land for the purposes of small holdings, reclamation, and drainage, to amend the enactments relating to small holdings and allotments, and otherwise to facilitate land settlement.
- Citation: 9 & 10 Geo. 5. c. 59
- Territorial extent: United Kingdom

Dates
- Royal assent: 19 August 1919
- Commencement: 19 August 1919 (Note: The Acts of Parliament (Commencement) Act 1793.)
Other legislation
Amends	Small Holdings and Allotments Act 1908
Amended by	Land Settlement Amendment Act 1921; Expiring Laws Act 1922; Allotments Act 1922; Settled Land Act 1925; Land Settlement (Facilities) Amendment Act 1925; Small Holdings and Allotments Act 1926; Statute Law Revision Act 1927; Agricultural Land (Utilisation) Act 1931; Local Government Act 1933; Acquisition of Land (Authorisation Procedure) Act 1946; Agriculture Act 1947; Statute Law Revision Act 1947; Allotments Act 1950; London Government Act 1963; Compulsory Purchase Act 1965; London Government Order 1965; National Loans Act 1968; Agriculture Act 1970; Local Government Act 1972; Rentcharges Act 1977; Criminal Law Act 1977; Local Government, Planning and Land Act 1980; Acquisition of Land Act 1981; Criminal Justice Act 1982; Agricultural Holdings Act 1986; Statute Law (Repeals) Act 1993; Statute Law (Repeals) Act 2004; Community Empowerment (Scotland) Act 2015 (Supplementary and Consequential Provisions) Order 2018

Status: Amended

Text of statute as originally enacted

Revised text of statute as amended

Text of the Land Settlement (Facilities) Act 1919 as in force today (including any amendments) within the United Kingdom, from legislation.gov.uk.

The Land Settlement (Facilities) Act 1919 (9 & 10 Geo. 5. c. 59) is an act of the Parliament of the United Kingdom passed in the United Kingdom following World War I. The act allowed local governments (namely county councils) to provide smallholdings (farmland) to veterans of the war. It eliminated the need for the recipient of the land to have experience or training in farming.

For example, Surrey County Council purchased more than 2,000 acres of land created small holdings for over 250 service men empowered by the Land Settlement (Facilities) Act 1919.
