= Small Holdings Act 1892 =

Act of the Parliament of the United Kingdom

Small Holdings Act 1892 (Note: Section 27.)
- Act of Parliament
- Parliament of the United Kingdom
- Long title: An Act to facilitate the acquisition of small agricultural holdings.
- Citation: 55 & 56 Vict. c. 31
- Territorial extent: England and Wales; Scotland; (Note: Section 25.)

Dates
- Royal assent: 27 June 1892
- Commencement: 1 October 1892 (Note: Section 26.)
Other legislation
Amends	Small Holdings and Allotments Act 1908
Amended by	Statute Law Revision Act 1908; Local Government (Scotland) Act 1947

Status: Amended

Text of statute as originally enacted

Revised text of statute as amended

Text of the Small Holdings Act 1892 as in force today (including any amendments) within the United Kingdom, from legislation.gov.uk.

The Small Holdings Act 1892 (55 & 56 Vict. c. 31) is an act of the Parliament of the United Kingdom passed by Lord Salisbury's Conservative government.

The act intended to help agricultural labourers purchase small holdings of land by giving County Councils the power to advance money to the labourer up to the limit of one penny in the pound of the county rate. A small holding was described as a plot of land larger than an acre but not more than 50 acres. If land over 50 acres was worth less than £50 a year in value it was considered a small holding. In a speech in Exeter Lord Salisbury confessed he did not believe that small holdings were the most efficient use of land but added that there were "things more important than economy": "I believe a small proprietary is the strongest bulwark against revolutionary change". The Liberal leader William Ewart Gladstone supported the Bill but wished it had granted councils the power to compulsory purchase land for small holdings. Joseph Chamberlain defended the absence of compulsory purchase powers by saying that there was insufficient evidence of the success of small-hold farming to warrant compulsion.

Two future Liberal Party MPs, Richard Winfrey and Clement Edwards, complained that the act was "an absolute failure owing to its operation being purely permissive". Few local authorities made use of the act.
