= Harry L. Cooper =

U.S. Army officer (c. 1870–1935)

- Born: c. 1870; Philadelphia, Pennsylvania, U.S.
- Died: September 1, 1935 (aged 64–65) Glen Burnie, Maryland
- Education: University of Pennsylvania
- Spouse: Harriet née Bonnycastle
- Children: 1

Harry L. Cooper (c. 1870 – September, 1935) was a United States Army colonel who received the Army Distinguished Service Medal for his service in World War I.

== Military career ==
Harry Cooper enlisted in the Pennsylvania National Guard as a private in 1889. Between 1889 and 1901 he completed a degree from the University of Pennsylvania and received a commission in the United States Army. As a second lieutenant, Cooper was assigned to the Porto Rico Battalion Volunteer Infantry from 2 August 1899 until 1901. As a first lieutenant, Cooper was assigned to the 23rd Infantry on 19 October 1901. He later transferred from the 23rd Infantry to the 28th Infantry Regiment (United States) on 18 August 1902.

From 1901 to 1904 the 28th Infantry was in the Philippines during the Philippine–American War, from 1906 to 1908 in Cuba for the Cuban Pacification, and from 1913 to 1917 in Mexico for the Pancho Villa Expedition. By 1913, Cooper was the commander of Company "L", considered the top ("crack") unit in the 28th Infantry based at Fort Snelling, Minnesota.

About November 1916, Cooper assumed command of the Officer's School at Fort Sill, Oklahoma. On 6 April 1917, the United States entered World War I. Cooper was promoted to rank of Major, effective 3 August 1917. Cooper likely received his promotion to Lieutenant Colonel in October, as he subsequently reported on 1 November 1917 as a lieutenant colonel assigned to Camp Dodge, Iowa as Chief of Staff under Colonel Lincoln, and tasked with division infantry training on machine guns. Camp Dodge was a military draft camp created in response to World War I, the entirety of which became activated as the first 88th Infantry Division (United States). Cooper's orders were officially updated to the 88th Division, Infantry, 28 November 1917.

On August 5, 1918, Cooper assumed duties as Commandant, 2nd Corps Schools, Chatillon France. The 2nd Corps Schools were established on 4 February 1918 to deliver specialized training in modern warfare to select officers and NCOs, following the harsh experiences of U.S. troops on World War I battlefields where tactics and technologies from the Banana Wars proved ineffective. The 2nd Corps Schools included an Artillery School, Infantry Weapons' School, Engineering School, Field Officer's School, Gas School, Signal School, Sanitary School, Tactical School, and an Aeronautical School. The roots of TRADOC reach back to this era, a revolutionary period of change in both military doctrine and readiness for the United States as expeditionary capabilities evolved from pack-animal warfare to mechanized warfare. For his exceptional service during this critical time, Cooper was awarded the Army Distinguished Service Medal, and received the following citation:

The President of the United States of America, authorized by Act of Congress, July 9, 1918, takes pleasure in presenting the Army Distinguished Service Medal to Colonel (Infantry) Harry L. Cooper, United States Army, for exceptionally meritorious and distinguished services to the Government of the United States, in a duty of great responsibility during World War I. Colonel Cooper commanded the 2d Army Corps School at Chatillon, France, from 15 August 1918 to 19 May 1919. He so organized and coordinated the various activities at these schools that 1,800 to 2,500 students were constantly undergoing instruction. He was primarily responsible for the excellent system of training given, which training as received at these schools exercised a strong influence toward the efficiency of the whole body of American troops in France. By his sound administrative and superior technical ability, untiring zeal, and splendid judgment in reorganizing and expanding the schools, he produced and organization of the highest efficiency. He rendered services of signal worth to the American Expeditionary Forces in a position of great responsibility.
General Orders: War Department, General Orders No. 4 (1923)
Action Date: August 15, 1918 – May 19, 1919
Service: Army
Rank: Colonel
Company: Commanding Officer

After his return to the United States from France, in 1920 Cooper and his family lived in Fort Leavenworth, Kansas. By 1930, Cooper had been transferred to Fort Meade, Maryland. In 1931, Cooper served in the Office of the Chief of Infantry under Major General Stephen O. Fuqua, his 43rd year in uniform.

== Personal life ==
Harry L. Cooper was born in 1870 in Philadelphia, Pennsylvania USA.

Around 1903 at the age of 33, he married Harriet Bonnycastle, daughter of John Charles Bonnycastle and Harriet Everett. Harriet was a widow from Kentucky with three children, whose husband John Stewart Harrison had died on 16 December 1901. Harriet Bonnycastle Cooper died 17 February 1942 in Wilmington, North Carolina. Harry and Harriet had one child together, Barbara Eleanor Cooper, who died in 1970.

== Memorials ==
The Colonel Harry L. Cooper Post #160 of the Veterans of Foreign Wars in Glen Burnie Maryland is proudly named in his honor.

Cooper is buried with his wife at Arlington National Cemetery.
