= Henry Alexander Cooper =

English sideshow performer (1853–1899)

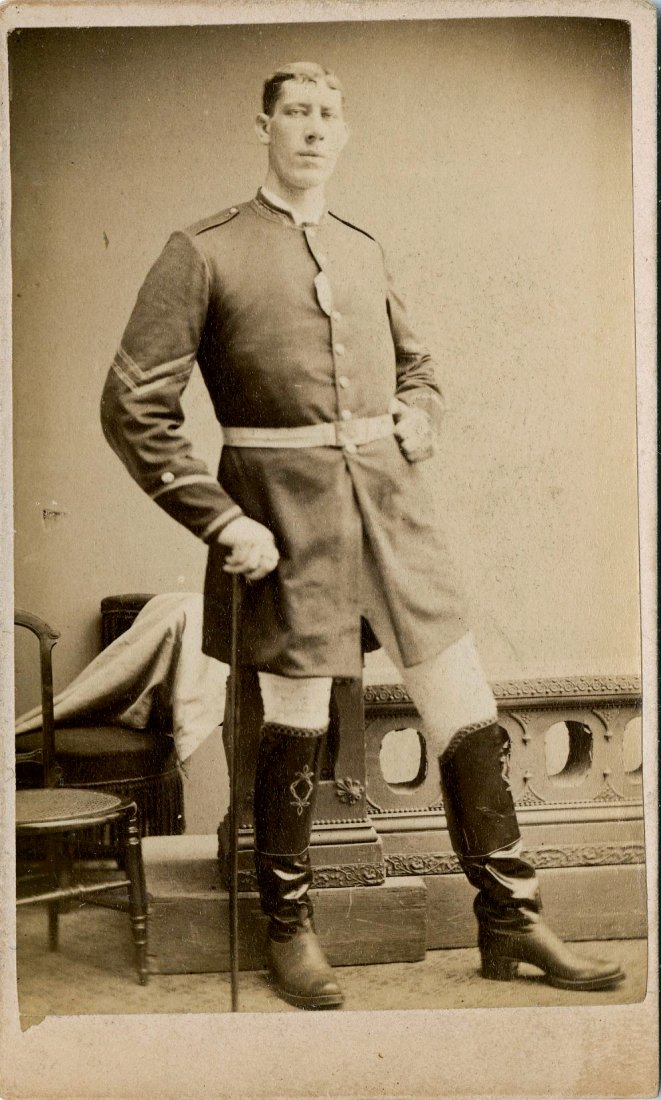
- Newman, c. 1880
- Born: 12 January 1853; Norton-on-Derwent, East Riding of Yorkshire, England
- Died: 16 August 1899 (aged 46); Calgary, Alberta, Canada
- Other names: The Yorkshire Giant
- Occupation: Sideshow performer
- Known for: Billed as the tallest man in the world.

Henry Alexander Cooper (12 June 1853 – 16 August 1899) born in Norton-on-Derwent, East Riding of Yorkshire, England, was a 19th-century celebrity billed by P. T. Barnum as The Tallest Man in the World.
