= Allotments Act 1950 =

Act of the Parliament of the United Kingdom

Allotments Act 1950 (Note: Section 15(1).)
- Act of Parliament
- Parliament of the United Kingdom
- Long title: An Act to amend the law relating to allotments and to abolish restrictions on the keeping of hens and rabbits.
- Citation: 14 Geo. 6. c. 31
- Territorial extent: England and Wales (Note: Section 15(2).)

Dates
- Royal assent: 26 October 1950
- Commencement: 26 October 1950 (Note: The Acts of Parliament (Commencement) Act 1793.)
Other legislation
| Amends | Small Holdings and Allotments Act 1908; Land Settlement (Facilities) Act 1919; Allotments Act 1922; Allotments Act 1925 |
| Amended by | Emergency Laws (Miscellaneous Provisions) Act 1953; Parish Councils Act 1957; Decimal Currency Act 1969; Statute Law (Repeals) Act 1973; Statute Law (Repeals) Act 1993; Statute Law (Repeals) Act 2004 |

Status: Amended

Text of statute as originally enacted

Revised text of statute as amended

Text of the Allotments Act 1950 as in force today (including any amendments) within the United Kingdom, from legislation.gov.uk.

The Allotments Act 1950 (14 Geo. 6. c. 31) is an act of the Parliament of the United Kingdom passed in the United Kingdom by the Labour government of Clement Attlee. It improved provisions for compensation and tenancy rights, and abolished contract-restraints on keeping rabbits and hens on allotment gardens.
