= Henry Cooper (footballer) =

Costa Rican footballer (born 1989)

Personal information
- Full name: Henry Leroy Cooper Bennett
- Date of birth: 11 December 1989 (age 36)
- Place of birth: Limón, Costa Rica
- Height: 1.87 m (6 ft 2 in)
- Position: Forward

Team information
- Current team: Puerto Golfito

Youth career
- 2010–2011: Limón

Senior career*
Years	Team	Apps	(Gls)
2011–2012	Caribe		(29)
2012–2013	Limón	22	(10)
2013	→ Murciélagos (loan)	4	(0)
2013–2014	Pérez Zeledón	37	(4)
2014–2015	Limón	16	(3)
2016	Jicaral		
2016	Limón	2	(0)
2017	Puntarenas		
2018	Juventud Escazuceña		
2018	Puerto Golfito		
2019	Limón	12	(2)
2019–	Puerto Golfito		
- * Club domestic league appearances and goals

Henry Leroy Cooper Bennett (born 11 December 1989) is a Costa Rican footballer who plays as a forward for Puerto Golfito FC.

== Career ==
On 8 March 2013, at eighth date of league, Cooper made his debut with Murciélagos against Estudiantes Tecos, playing as a substitute of Arnhold Rivas at minute 77. On 19 April 2013, he played his first game as titular with the team against Real Saltillo Soccer. At the end of season and after play only four games and not scoring goals with the team, Cooper announced his return to Costa Rica with the Limón.

On 3 May 2013, Limón announced through their official Facebook page that Henry Cooper would return to the team after his pass by Mexico. However, on 27 May, the team announced that Cooper and his teammates Jesús Camacho and Juan Diego Ruiz were released from Limón FC. After some days, Municipal Pérez Zeledón announced the signing of Henry Cooper with their team.

Cooper debuted with the Pérez Zeledón at 1st date of Costa Rican Primera División championship, playing 24 minutes. At next game against Belén, Cooper scored his first goal of tournament. Henry Cooper was assigned the number 23 in his jersey. At final of Campeonato de Invierno 2013, Henry Cooper played 15 matches and scored 3 goals, which allowed him to recovered the regularity after his bad stance in Mexico.

In the Campeonato de Verano 2014, Henry Cooper played his first game of season as titular in the second date of championship. Cooper played all the game and scored a goal in the draw between the Municipal Pérez Zeledón and Belén.

== Honours ==
Individual

- Liga Nacional de Fútbol Aficionado top goalscorer: 2011–12.
