= Henry Cowper (1758–1840) =

Cowper, Henry (c.1753–1840), clerk assistant of the House of Lords

Henry Cowper (1758–1840), was a British lawyer, who served as assistance clerk of the House of Lords.

== Life ==
He was the third son of General Spencer Cowper, by Charlotte, daughter of John Baber; grandson of William Cowper, clerk of the parliaments 1739–40, and great-grandson of the judge Spencer Cowper (1670–1728). He was called to the bar at the Middle Temple on 26 – May 1775. From 1785 to 1826 he was Deputy Clerk of the Parliaments and clerk assistant of the House of Lords. He died at Tewin Water, near Tewin, Hertfordshire on 28 – November 1840. He married his cousin-german, Maria Judith, eldest daughter of the Reverend John Cowper, DD, rector of Church of St Peter but had no issue. By his will he left a sum of money for educating the poor children of Hertingfordbury parish.

== Works ==
- Reports of Cases in the Court of King's Bench from Hilary term 14 George III to 18 George III. Vol. I. Printed by A. Strahan, for E. and R. Brooke and J. Rider. 1800.
- Reports of Cases in the Court of King's Bench from Hilary term 14 George III to 18 George II. Vol. II. Printed by A. Strahan, for E. and R. Brooke and J. Rider. 1800.
