= Emerson Dorsch Gallery =

Art gallery in Miami, Florida

Coordinates: 25.7513°N 80.2160°W

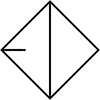
- Emerson Dorsch Gallery
- Type: Private
- Industry: Art Gallery
- Founder: Brook Dorsch
- Headquarters: Miami, Florida, United States
- Website: www.emersondorsch.com

The Emerson Dorsch Gallery, founded in 1991 as the Dorsch Gallery, is an art gallery in Miami, Florida, United States founded by Brook Dorsch. Initially located in Dorsch's 2nd story apartment over Parkway Drugs on Coral Way, the gallery featured the work of local young Miami artists, many of whom were enrolled in the University of Miami's Visual Arts department. The gallery gained an underground following after positive reviews from Miami Herald critic Helen Kohen.

In early 2000, the gallery relocated to Wynwood, one of the first commercial galleries to open there, and was a driving force in setting up the Wynwood Art District in 2001.

In 2013, the Dorsch Gallery was renamed to Emerson Dorsch, reflecting the addition of Tyler Emerson-Dorsch as a partner in the gallery, along with a renovation of the building. The gallery closed at the Wynwood location in June 2015 and subsequently relocated to Little Haiti.

The gallery represents South Florida artists as well as emerging and mid-career visiting artists. Represented artists include Jen Clay, Clifton Childree, Felecia Chizuko Carlisle, Elisabeth Condon, Eleen Lin, Karen Rifas, Onajide Shabaka, Robert Thiele, Frances Trombly, and Paula Wilson. Emerson Dorsch has mounted solo exhibitions by notable artists such as: Walter Darby Bannard, Robert Chambers, Corin Hewitt, Victoria Fu, Michael Jones McKean, Brookhart Jonquil, Siebren Versteeg, Arnold Mesches, Tameka Norris Gustavo Matamoros, Cheryl Pope, Mette Tommerup and Saya Woolfalk.

The Gallery's program crosses over to other cultural events outside of the visual arts such as concerts and dance performances. They have featured varied artists such as Iron and Wine, SSingSSing, Tere O'Connor, Arthur Doyle, Cock ESP, Otto von Schirach and Awesome New Republic.
