= Wynwood Art District =

District of the Wynwood neighborhood of Miami, Florida

Coordinates: 25°48′2.05″N 80°11′56.48″W

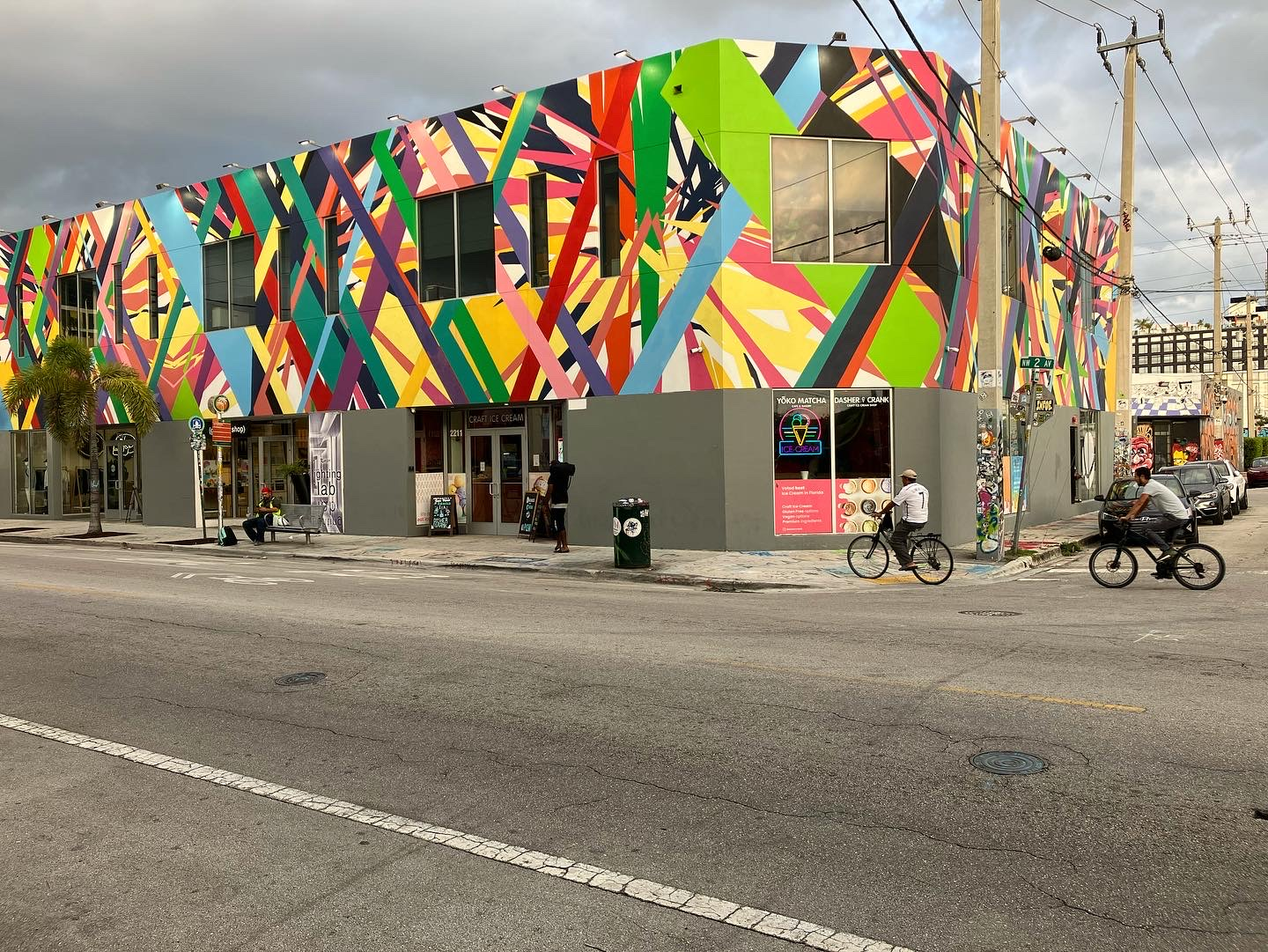
Wynwood street art, February 2023

The Wynwood Art District is a district of the Wynwood neighborhood of Miami, Florida. It is home to over 10 galleries, museums and collections and is known for its street art. It is roughly bounded by North 36th Street (US 27) (north), North 20th Street (south), I-95 (west) and Northeast First Avenue (east). It is one of the largest open-air street art installations in the world.

== History ==
The Wynwood Art District Association was founded in early 2003 by a group of art dealers, artists and curators Mark Coetzee, Nina Arias and Nick Cindric. Mark Coetzee initiated the idea based on a similar project, Art Night, which he started in his hometown, Cape Town, South Africa. Founding members at the first meeting in Rocket Projects media room were Brook Dorsch of Emerson Dorsch Gallery, Weston Charles, Cooper and Elizabeth Withstandley of Locust Projects, Mark Coetzee of the Rubell Family Collection, Nina Arias and Nick Cindric of Rocket Projects, Bernice Steinbaum of Bernice Steinbaum Gallery, and Marina Kessler of Marina Kessler Gallery. The association created the Second Saturdays Gallery Walk, designed the Manhole cover logo along with the light banners that hang on street corners, and publishes annual brochures with a map and a list of the association's members.

The Wynwood Walls were created in 2009 by the late Tony Goldman in an effort to develop the area's pedestrian potential. Goldman bought his first building in Wynwood in 2004, and owned nearly two dozen properties by 2008. Artists from around the world have contributed to the Wynwood Walls. The Walls have been covered by media such as the New York Times and the BBC bringing international attention to the destination. It was also featured in the docu-series entitled Here Comes the Neighborhood. The Walls have expanded to include murals outside the neighborhood, including Outside the Walls which features art covering entire buildings. In 2010, Goldman added the Wynwood Doors to highlight smaller artists. Curbed listed Wynwood Walls as among the 16 most Instagrammable places in US cities in 2018.

The neighborhood thrived on the growth of Art Basel Miami Beach and it was once home to over 70 galleries, five museums, three collections, seven art complexes, 12 art studios, five art fairs, and the Wynwood Walls. As of 2018, every second Saturday of each month, a community-wide art walk was held. Galleries, art studios, alternative spaces and showrooms opened their doors to the public for art, music and refreshments. In addition, The Wynwood Walls grew to have more than 400 businesses in the area. There were 30 food stops within this 50 block art district.

As of 2020, less than ten galleries remained, as the neighborhood struggled with gentrification and increased rent.
