= Robert Chambers (sculptor) =

American sculptor (born 1958)

- Born: Robert Lucas Chambers; 1958 (age 67–68); Miami, Florida, US
- Occupation: Sculptor
- Employers: University of Miami; New York University
- Known for: Installations, experimentation
- Spouse: Mette Tommerup

Chambers' sculpture "Sugabus" (2004)

Robert Lucas Chambers (born 1958) is an American sculptor from Miami, Florida. His most recent public artwork is the South Miami Dade Art and Cultural Center. 'Light Field' and 'Adze' and 'Celt'.

== Background and education ==
He received a BFA from University of Miami in 1983 and an MA from New York University in 1990. He returned later to teach at University of Miami and New York University. and is married to Danish-born painter Mette Tommerup.

== Collections ==
His sculptures appear in the permanent collections of the Kemper Museum in Kansas City, Missouri, the Museum of Modern Art in New York City, and the Miami Art Museum. The son of an artist mother and a molecular scientist father, Chambers often includes scientific motifs in his sculptures. He describes his work as having "a sense of experimental playfulness. The rigidity of science, chemistry and physics is broken by a desire to re-contextualize empirical research thru a sculptor's vantage point. He is represented by Emerson Dorsch Gallery in Miami. " Chambers has also used debris from Florida hurricanes in his work.

Chambers' 2004 sculpture "Sugabus", 45 globes of bronze representing the elements of a sucrose molecule in the shape of a poodle, appears at Laumeier Sculpture Park in St. Louis, Missouri. The work's title is a portmanteau of "sugar" and Cerberus, the three-headed dog that guards the underworld in ancient Greek mythology. The sculpture is 14 ft × 12 ft × 12 ft (4.3 m × 3.7 m × 3.7 m) and weights 6 short tons (5.4 t).

== Art Basel Miami ==
During Art Basel Miami in November 2007, Chambers installed a sculpture titled "Rotorelief" on roof of the Sagamore Hotel. The sculpture consisted of a working helicopter, the blades of which had been replaced by hypnotic discs.

== Bakehouse Art Complex ==
During the fall of 2018, Chambers was involved with a special hay installation at Bakehouse Art Complex, which involved creating a social area with bales of hay for an art event. He worked with a class from Florida International University to bring the project to fruition.
