= Mette Tommerup =

Painter (born Denmark 1969)

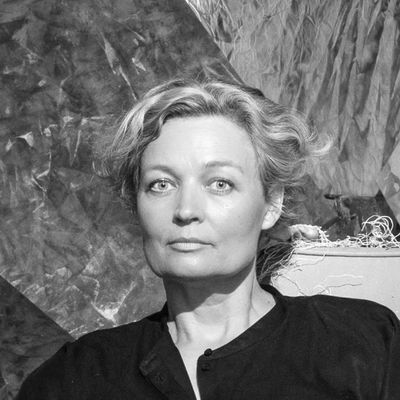
- Born: Mette Tommerup; 1969 (age 56–57); Kalundborg, Denmark
- Known for: Paintings, installations, activations
- Awards: Hassam, Speicher, Betts, and Symons Purchase Fund, American Academy of Arts and Letters
- Website: www.mettetommerup.com

Mette Tommerup (born 1969) is a painter from Denmark, who lives and works in Miami. She is best known for creating large-scale works where she activates canvases by subjecting them to natural elements such as immersing them in ocean water, putting them in the ground, or tossing them off of buildings at a particular time of day or night. Her art is characterized by exploration, liberation, deconstruction, and immersive performance.

== Background and education ==
As a native of Denmark, Tommerup grew up in a small coastal town in a country whose history, back to the Viking days, is entwined with the sea. She now lives in Miami close to Biscayne Bay. She received a BFA from Indiana University of Pennsylvania in 1990 and an MFA from School of Visual Arts New York City in 1995. After moving to Miami, she was an adjunct professor of painting from 2003 to 2006 and then became assistant professor of painting from 2008 to 2011 in the Department of Art + Art History at Florida International University. She left academia to devote to art full time. According to data from Artfacts.net, Tommerup is most frequently exhibited in the United States, but also has had exhibitions in Germany.

== Trilogy ==
In 2015, Tommerup began a trilogy of installations that followed the pilgrimage of 40-by-12-foot canvases created in natural environments.

=== Ocean Loop ===
The first, Ocean Loop, opened at Emerson Dorsch on January 26, 2018, where the artist used the ocean as a springboard for exploration. The installation was created in post-Hurricane Irma Miami and started as a series of experiments reminiscent of postwar avant-garde movements like Gutai, Arte Povera and Conceptual Art. She attached small oil paintings of the sea to a string and immersed them in the ocean. Some broke free and disappeared. She was able to reel others back in, battered and discolored by salt and water. She then repeated the experience with squares of raw canvas and, after retrieving them sewed their water stained remains together. She grew salt crystals on paintings and treated raw canvas with blue dye and salt water to create a surface that suggested the patterns of rippling water.

=== Love, Ur ===
The second of the installations, Love, Ur, opened at Emerson Dorsch on November 29, 2019. Wall Street International Magazine published an article about the show in its Art section on December 13, 2019, stating that for the solo exhibition, Tommerup would create a complex installation from her dyed canvases, which debuted in her 2017 exhibition Ocean Loop. She will create zones of canvases, undulating like tectonic plates. In various planned interventions, she invited friends and allies to animate her elements. The visitors were to become protagonists, as were the canvases, in something like an analog video game. For the exhibition brochure, essayist Eleanor Heartney wrote that participants (the word viewer no longer seems appropriate) are free to wander through a chaotic world, making their own path between elements whose effects veer from the intimate to the overwhelming. The work is designed to imbue a sense of release that is at once unsettling, liberating and connective.

=== Made By Dusk ===
The third and final work in the trilogy, in which Tommerup explored art's ability to provide experiences of reflection, connection and restoration, was titled Made By Dusk. It opened at Locust Projects on November 27, 2020, and was supposed to run until January 23, but was extended through February 13, 2021. For “Made by Dusk,” Tommerup was inspired by Freya, the Nordic goddess of love, beauty and transformation who cried tears of gold. While the installation was in the works before the COVID-19 pandemic, its gilded and womblike atmosphere added a place of refuge during a time of forced pause due to the coronavirus.

== Art Week Miami ==
During a reduced Miami Art Week in December 2020 because of COVID-19, Tommerup presented the activation, Liminal, in conjunction with the final series in her trilogy, the exhibition Made by Dusk at Locust Projects in the Miami Design District. Starting at twilight, the sold-out performance included video projections on a massive canvas streaming down from the roof covering a portion of the parking lot upon which were placed blocks of dry ice. Attendees were invited to make a symbolic offering to the Nordic Goddess Freya by dripping honey from small jars onto the individual cubes, creating a hazy fog through sublimation that captured the light. The artist appeared from her position on the roof of Locust Projects at various intervals during the four 30-minute performances, at times laboriously pulling and lowering massive canvases and, at others, casting a stream of golden flowers across the scene below. Ambient ethereal sounds by artist-composer Dave Brieske, filled the night air as attendees’ honeyed wishes and desires were cast heavenward.

== Solo exhibitions ==
- 2020: "Made by Dusk" Locust Projects (Miami, FL)
- 2019: "Love, Ur," Emerson Dorsch Gallery (Miami, FL)
- 2018: "Ocean Loop" Emerson Dorsch Gallery (Miami, FL)
- 2011: "Full Salute" Emerson Dorsch Gallery (Miami, FL)
- 2010: "11 Glimpses" Emerson Dorsch Gallery (Miami, FL)
- 2006: "TRACKS" Project Room, Frederic Snitzer Gallery (Miami, FL)

== Art commissions ==
- In December 2009 and December 2010, Tommerup was awarded art commissions for two projects for Royal Caribbean International. The first project on Deck 15 of Oasis of the Seas was a floor project entitled "Diagonal Islands." The second was for Allure of the Seas where she created another floor project for that ship's Deck 15 entitled "Points + Hemisphere".
- In 2020, Tommerup received a private commission from The Related Group for SLS Cancun Hotel & Residences, Mexico, where she created Double Sea, an installation of wall-sized canvases inside the hotel.
