= Paula Wilson =

American mixed-media artist (born 1975)

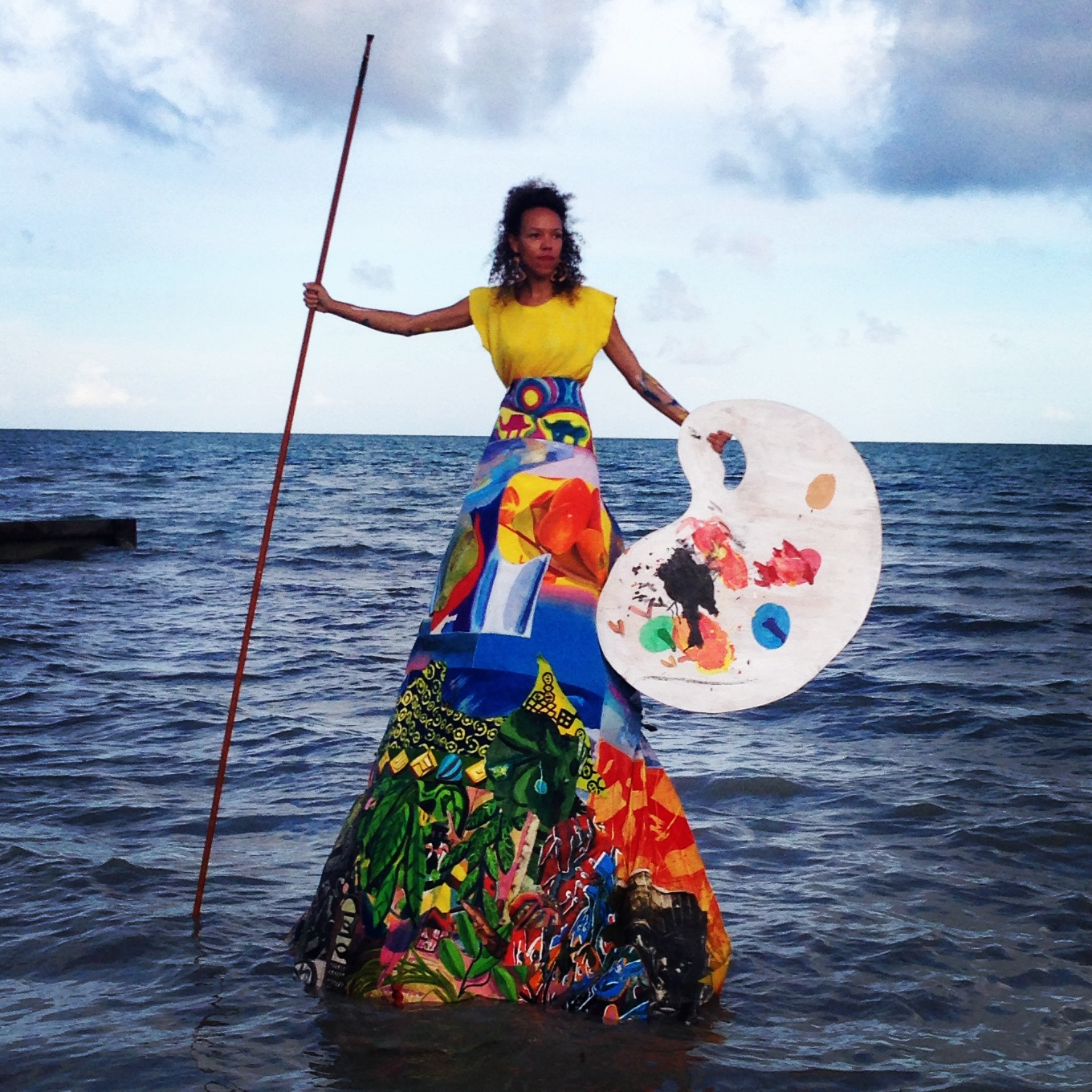
- From Wilson's 2014 video Salty & Fresh
- Born: Paula Jane Wilson; Chicago, Illinois, U.S.
- Education: Washington University in St. Louis (BFA); Columbia University (MFA)
- Occupation: Mixed-media artist
- Website: paulajwilson.com

Paula Wilson (born December 17, 1975) is an African-American mixed-media artist creating works examining women's identities through a lens of cultural history. She uses sculpture, collage, painting, installation, and printmaking methods such as silkscreen, lithography, and woodblock. In 2007, Wilson moved from Brooklyn, New York, to Carrizozo, New Mexico (population 996), where she currently lives and works with her woodworking partner Mike Lagg.

== Early life ==
Paula Wilson was born in Chicago, and grew up in Hyde Park on the south side of the city, where her father, William Julius Wilson, was a professor of sociology at the University of Chicago. Her mother, Beverly Ann Wilson, is an artist and bookbinder.

== Education ==
Wilson attended Washington University in St. Louis from 1994 to 1998, earning her B.F.A. and graduating summa cum laude. She earned her M.F.A. from Columbia University.

== Life and work ==
Wilson is known for her monumental and tactile work describing narratives and environments that fit her experience as a biracial black woman. She reimagines art historical tropes and inserts versions of herself into the landscape and canon. Shifting between graphic and painterly representations, she builds narratives by collapsing pictorial planes. Wilson’s work is anchored in self-portrait, printmaking, installation, and collage. She prints images with wood blocks, silkscreens, intaglio, and monotypes; layers acrylic, oil, and spray paint; shoots videos inserting 2-D work into the landscape; she cuts, glues, and stitches to make colorful, dense assemblages. Her works often burst from their wall or frame, reflecting a constant re-assembly of lived experiences: black and white, urban and rural, traditional and contemporary, singular and collective.

Wilson is co-founder of the artist organizations MoMAZoZo (founded in 2010) and the Carrizozo Artist in Residency (AIR)(founded in 2016).

=== Academia ===
Wilson was a Visiting Critic at Yale School of Art from 2005 to 2007 and an assistant professor at Columbia University School of the Arts from 2007 to 2008. In 2015. she served as the Louis D. Beaumont Artist-in-Residence & Visiting Assistant Professor in the College and Graduate School of Art in the Sam Fox School of Design & Visual Arts at Washington University in St. Louis. She has been a visiting artist at many institutions and universities nationally.

- Visiting Artist, Boston University, Boston, Massachusetts, 2016
- Visiting Lecturer, Pratt Institute, Brooklyn, New York, 2017
- Visiting Lecturer, Pennsylvania Academy of the Fine Arts, Philadelphia, Pennsylvania, 2017
- Visiting Artists, Cranbrook Academy of Art, Bloomfield Hills, Michigan, 2020
- Visiting Artist, Oberlin College, Oberlin, Ohio, 2020

=== Solo exhibitions ===
- 2000–What's So Personal, The Butcher Shop, Chicago, Illinois
- 2006–Paintings and Drawings from the Hanno Valley, Galleria Suzy Shammah, Milan, Italy
- 2008–The Stained Glass Ceiling, Bellwether Gallery, New York, New York
- 2010–First Story, The Fabric Workshop and Museum, Philadelphia, Pennsylvania
- 2014–"Undress, Center for Contemporary Arts, Spector Ripps Project Space, Santa Fe, New Mexico
- 2015–Back it Up, Museum Blue, St. Louis, Missouri
- 2015–Salty & Fresh, Cherry & Lucic, Portland, Oregon
- 2017–Salty & Fresh, Emerson Dorsch Gallery, Miami, Florida
- 2017–Paula Wilson: The Backward Glance, Bemis Center for Contemporary Art, Omaha, Nebraska
- 2018–FLOORED, HOLDING Contemporary, Portland, Oregon
- 2018–PIECESCAPE, Visitor Welcome Center, Los Angeles, California
- 2018–Spread Wild: Pleasures of the Yucca, Smack Mellon, Brooklyn, New York
- 2018–The Light Becomes You, Denny Dimin Gallery, New York, New York
- 2019–Entangled, 516 ARTS, Albuquerque, New Mexico
- 2022–Be Wild. Bewilder, Emerson Dorsch Gallery, Miami, Florida

=== Selected group exhibitions ===
- 2000–Young Love, Mapreed Gallery, Los Angeles, California
- 2001–Brat(Wurst): A Show of Chicago Artists, Vox Populi, Philadelphia, Pennsylvania
- 2002–Signs, Public Art Installation, Chicago, Illinois
- 2004–Hungry Eyes, First Year MFA Exhibition, Columbia University, Ira D. Wallach Gallery, New York, New York
- 2004–After Goya, Leroy Neiman Gallery, Columbia University, Curated by Tomas Vu Daniel, New York, New York
- 2004–Past Perfect, Kantor/Feuer Gallery, New York, New York
- 2005–Recess: Images & Objects in Formation, Rush Gallery, Curated by Derek Adams, New York, New York
- 2005–MFA Thesis Exhibition, Studebaker Building, Curated by Jeffrey Uslip, New York, New York
- 2006–Frequency, Studio Museum in Harlem, New York, New York
- 2006–The Manhattan Project, Fred Snitzer Gallery, Miami, Florida
- 2006–Turn the Beat Around, Sikkema Jenkins & Co., New York, New York
- 2007–Black Alphabet, contexts of Contemporary African American Art, Zacheta National Gallery of Art, Warsaw, Poland
- 2007–Horizon, EFA Gallery, Curated by David Humphrey, New York, New York
- 2007–Cinema Remixed and Reloaded: Black Women Artists and the Moving Image Since 1970, Spelman College Museum of Fine Art, Atlanta, Georgia
- 2009–Cinema Remixed and Reloaded: Black Women Artists and the Moving Image Since 1970, Contemporary Arts Museum Houston, Houston, Texas
- 2009–Collected. Propositions on the Permanent Collection, Studio Museum in Harlem, New York, New York
- 2009–A Decade of Contemporary American Printmaking: 1999–2009, Tsingha University, Beijing, China
- 2009–While We Were Away, Sragow Gallery, New York, New York
- 2009–Carrizozo Artist's Show, Gallery 408, Carrizozo, New Mexico
- 2010–41st Collectors Show, Arkansas Art Center, Little Rock, Arkansas
- 2010–Defrosted: A Life of Walt Disney, Postmasters Gallery, New York, New York
- 2010–Art on Paper: The 41st Exhibition, Weatherspoon Art Museum, Greensboro, North Carolina
- 2011–The February Show, Ogilvy & Mather, New York, New York
- 2011–Art by Choice, Mississippi Museum of Art, Jackson, Mississippi
- 2012–Configured, Benrimon Contemporary, Curated By Teka Selman, New York, New York
- 2012–The Bearden Project, Studio Museum in Harlem, New York, New York
- 2013–Sanctify, Vincent Price Museum, Los Angeles, California
- 2013–I Am The Magic Hand, Sikkema Jenkins & Co, Organized by Josephine Halvorson, New York, New York
- 2015–DRAW: Mapping Madness, Inside – Out Art Museum, curated by Tomas Vu, Beijing, China 2014
- 2016–Visions Into Infinite Archives, SOMArts Cultural Center, curated by Black Salt Collective, San Francisco, California
- 2016–Residency, form & concept, Santa Fe, New Mexico
- 2016–Surface Area: Selections from the Permanent Collection, Studio Museum in Harlem, New York, New York
- 2017–The Young Years, The Frances Young Tang Teaching Museum and Art Gallery at Skidmore College, curated by Dayton Director Ian Berry, Saratoga Springs, New York
- 2017–The Unhomely, Denny Gallery, New York, New York
- 2017–Sunrise, Sunset, Emerson Dorsch Gallery, Miami, Florida
- 2019–20 and Odd: The 400-Year Anniversary of 1619, curated by Kalia Brooks Nelson, Leroy Neiman Gallery, Columbia University, New York, New York
- 2019–In This Body of Mine: Strange Fire Collective at the Milwaukee Institute of Art & Design, Milwaukee, Wisconsin
- 2019–Fragment, Emerson Dorsch Gallery, Miami, Florida
- 2019–Contemporary Performance, curated by Kalup Linzy, Florida Museum of Photographic Art, Tampa, Florida

== Personal life ==
Wilson currently lives and works in Carrizozo, New Mexico with her partner, woodworker Mike Lagg.

== Recognition ==
Wilson has been featured in publications such as Hyperallergic, Artforum, The New York Times, The Brooklyn Rail, and The New Yorker.

Wilson received the Award of Distinction from Washington University’s Sam Fox School of Design & Visual Arts, in St. Louis in 2019. She has been awarded residencies at the Fabric Workshop and Museum (2009–2010), Vermont Studio Center, and the Giverny Residency from the Art Production Fund in Giverny, France. She has also received a place on the short list, Joyce Alexander Wein Artist Prize, Studio Museum in Harlem, 2007 and the Milovich Award in Painting, School of Art, Washington University, 1998.
