= Siebren Versteeg =

American artist

- Born: August 5, 1971 (age 55)
- Education: School of Visual Arts, School of the Art Institute of Chicago, University of Illinois at Chicago
- Known for: Painting, Generative Art, Process Art, New Media Art
- Website: http://www.siebrenversteeg.com/

Siebren Versteeg (born August 5, 1971) is an American artist known for his painting and video works created through digital processes. His multivalent practice responds to the technology of our time and the way we consume and deploy those technologies.

Heralded by Vulture as "chaotic but illuminating", the magazine declared Versteeg the idol of "every Harry Potter-loving/Hackers-watching/anti-capitalist computer geek". Versteeg's work often relies on ready-made, online data sources for part of its media, with websites like Google, Flickr, and Wikipedia frequently collaborating with Versteeg's code. Throughout his career, Versteeg has playfully interacted with constructed identities and painterly abstraction through the use of code. Versteeg prefers to code in Lingo.

The artist is known to re-articulate familiar presentation formats and information systems popularized online, "ultimately jamming their promise of stability and ubiquity". Drawing attention to the variety of opinions, sources, conversations, and enterprises that contribute to the internet's sprawling information landscape, Versteeg's work often intervenes between mass media and its end consumer For example, the artist has been known to use recognizable brand identifiers from major companies, such as Napster and Coca-Cola, to deliver a pithy comment, or the day's headlines from the AP Newswire. In one series of the artist's algorithmically generated artworks, Versteeg instructs his code to paint over the day's front page of a credible newspaper using brushstrokes programmed to mimic an Abstract Expressionist style.

== Early life and education ==
Versteeg was born in 1971 in New Haven, Connecticut to Louise and Peter Versteeg. He earned his Bachelor of Fine Arts from the School of Art Institute of Chicago in 1995 and his Masters of Fine Arts from the University of Illinois at Chicago in 2004.

Versteeg's father built a career in fine art fabrication beginning in Los Angeles, where he cast sculptures for Tom Holland. Peter Versteeg went on to oversee projects for Robert Indiana, Claes Oldenburg, Louise Nevelson, and Lucas Samaras at Lippincott, INC, an internationally renowned fabrication studio in North Haven, Connecticut. After working as a CNC programmer at United Precision in the late 1970s, Versteeg's father opened Versteeg Art Fabricators in 1989 under the name "New Haven Art Fabricators". Siebren Versteeg and his sister Emily continue to operate the family business.

Notably, Peter Versteeg oversaw the fabrication of Robert Indiana's LOVE (1970) sculpture the year before his son's birth. A year after Peter's death in 2021, Siebren Versteeg returned to the sculpture with an ephemeral artwork titled Love Live x Five (2022) Comprising the work are five computer windows stacked in the form a cross, each depicting the same livestream of Versteeg Art Fabricator's studio as they worked to restore Indiana's LOVE sculpture.

Siebren Versteeg referenced his father in earlier artworks, too. In 2005, the artist created The MP3 Collection of My Father, which was exhibited in Press Enter to Exit, Versteeg's second show at Rhona Hoffman Gallery. The work allowed visitors to listen to Peter Versteeg's "MP3 collection of popular African music by navigating a PC program that also allowed users to illegally burn CDs of the recorded files".

== Exhibitions ==
=== 1999–2004 ===
Between 1999 and 2003, Versteeg showed works through video screenings at artist-run spaces, online and at theatrical venues. During this period, Versteeg participated in www.WhitneyBiennial.Com, an online exhibit that made a guerilla art-style presentation on the back doors of 23 U-Haul trucks surrounding the museum during the 2002 Whitney Biennial Gala. The presentation intended to "expose multiple, sometimes conflicting currents, as well as extraordinary works that fall outside of any conventional aesthetic definition".

An important work from this period is Versteeg's Dynamic Ribbon Device (2003), which juxtaposes the Associated Press's live news feed with "mass-media gadgetry". In the artwork, Coca-Cola's trademark white ribbon billows across a red background plasma screen while a scrolling script registers headline news. Shown in determination, Versteeg's debut solo presentation at Rhona Hoffman Gallery in 2005, one journalist noted that condensation droplets flowing down the scrolling graphics in the work seem to be placed "as if to add luster to this intramural media affair".

In November 2003, the Museum of Contemporary Art Chicago mounted a solo show for Versteeg, the artist's first solo exhibition at a major institution. Curated in the museum's 12 x 12: New Artists/New Work, Versteeg's Being Here and History unpack our perception of time by appropriating pop culture. Three scenes are depicted in Being Here (2003): a digital animation showing the artist in a waiting room; the current day and time; and, a television mounted to the wall. History confronts the viewer with a large replica of The History Channel's logo.

A year later, Katie Geha curated History and Being Here at the Ulrich Museum of Art in Wichita, Kansas, an important solo exhibition in Versteeg's early career that reaffirmed the artist's presentation at the Museum of Contemporary Art Chicago. In 2020, on the occasion of Versteeg's email-exhibition In20%Memory, Geha reflected on the cultural environment surrounding Versteeg's Being Here (2003):

"In 2004, I showed the live computer work Being Here (2003) at the Ulrich Museum of Art. I went into the gallery every day and watched the run up to the re-election of President Bush. It was a devastating time in America...

It is no surprise during this fraught political climate [of the COVID-19 pandemic] that Versteeg has chosen to resurrect and rework this piece, which so firmly places the viewer in this excruciating moment, minute by minute. It is also telling that our belief in common truths, of maybe any belief system at all, is so thoroughly eroded in our current mediated environment.

Live news is as much a provisional memorial as anything else. Take, for instance, the CNN sign in Atlanta, covered with graffiti by Black Lives Matter protesters earlier this summer; one of the most touching works of art I've seen."

=== 2005–2010 ===
Versteeg gained representation by Rhona Hoffman Gallery by 2005, and with Max Protetch Gallery in 2007. He continued to exhibit work in group shows and several museums exhibited Versteeg's work in solo and group settings.

In 2007, Versteeg contributed to a group show at New York-based gallery Foxy Productions titled Solar Set, a reference to a boxed artwork by Joseph Cornell from 1958 in which Cornell "collected and arranged solar statistics, spherical objects, and images of the sun, among other elements, to create an idiosyncratic universe in miniature". The show received overwhelmingly positive reviews, many of which noted Versteeg's artworks as exhibition highlights. For The Satan Series, Versteeg trained a drawing program to search Google Images using the prompt "Satan" and to recreate the image results as drawings. The digitally-drawn pictures were exhibited as inkjet prints that had "a delicacy and sootiness that recall etchings". In their review of the show, Rachel Wolff, Vulture's Art Candy Reviewer, praised "the fake Intel logo reading Satan Inside". Versteeg also created a site-specific installation composed of snapshots scraped from the photo-sharing website Flickr and neatly organized into a grid. From afar, the installation was likened to a crazy-quilt in its appearance.

In 2010, the RISD Museum mounted a show of Versteeg's work titled In Advance of Another Thing. Judith Tannenbaum, the exhibition's curator, explained how Versteeg appropriates meaning from traditional formats and images to give "them new meanings that resonate in today's world". Curated into the exhibit, Versteeg's Boom (Fresher Acconci) (2007) creates a dialogue between the artist's practice and earlier art history. Where Vito Acconci's 1976 work The Red Tapes summarizes important booms in U.S. history, Versteeg continues this practice by programming a code to display a series of Google Images to document the internet boom and the information boom.

By 2010, Versteeg joined Regina Rex, an artist-run gallery and studio space that was founded in Brooklyn, New York's Bushwick neighborhood under the name Queens County, Kings County. By 2016, the space had moved to New York City's Lower East Side neighborhood and was known as Regina Rex. The collective was made up of 10 organizing artists who shared a desire to "carve out a context that is not beholden to the social and commercial pressures of the greater art world".

==== Rhona Hoffman Gallery ====
In 2003, Chicago-based Rhona Hoffman Gallery offered Siebren Versteeg's work at art fairs, including The Armory Show in New York City; Art Chicago; and, Art Basel Miami Beach.

In 2005, Rhona Hoffman Gallery first exhibited Versteeg's work in a solo show titled determination, which "ostensibly refers to the artist's search for logic and order amid the frenzy of a media-saturated, digitized world." The show was mounted as Web 2.0 began to be deployed as a structure through which netizens could construct a participatory, fluid social identity. Neither There nor There (2005) seemingly undermined the implied permanence of the show's title. The artwork depicts a dual portrait of Versteeg in his studio displayed on two adjoining LCD screens while a swarm of pixels migrate between each screen, never fully realizing a complete portrait of the artist. In reviews of determination, the artwork was noted as the ultimate crystallization of Versteeg's subversive critique of the indeterminacy and uncertainty of contemporary media structures.

Accessioned by The Hirshhorn Museum and Sculpture Garden in Washington D.C., Neither There nor There appeared in an important two-part 2008 exhibition titled The Cinema Effect: Illusion, Reality and the Moving Image. In his review of the exhibit for The Washington Post, Blake Gopnik observed that "there has come to be a blurring of the boundaries between fact and cinematic fiction". Versteeg's work would be presented in a similar context in 2014 in The Hirshhorn's Days of Endless Time.

Subversive themes around identity, and an abundance of information continued to build towards a 2007 show at Rhona Hoffman Gallery titled Press Enter to Exit. Critic James Yood reviewed the show in ArtForum's March 2008 issue writing that its title insinuates that, "despite the heady promise of a 24/7 global community, the Internet, a proliferating labyrinth always turning in on itself, may isolate as much as it liberates." Included in the show was Versteeg's 2008 installation OWN NOTHING, HAVE EVERYTHING, a monumental, thirty-four-foot-long mural with "a cell-phone-sized LCD screen bearing the Napster logo" installed in the center of the work that reads: "OWN NOTHING, HAVE EVERYTHING". Versteeg extends the logo's radiating black-and-white arcs "from their minuscule source onto the wall in a megalomaniacal explosion that ends only when the wall does". Yood's review concludes that, "the promise of Napster, and of the Web in general… seems to Versteeg to be unfulfilled."

In 2011, the gallery mounted their last solo presentation of Versteeg's work Inaction. Rhona Hoffman Gallery included Versteeg's art in the gallery's retrospective 40 Years, Part 1 in 2016.

==== Max Protetch Gallery ====
In 2007, Max Protetch Gallery mounted Versteeg's first show in New York City, Nothing Was, in the gallery's satellite space. Featured in the show, Something for Everyone (2007) is "a photographic triptych of a F-117 Nighthawk stealth bomber patrolling above a sea of three hundred thousand images drawn randomly from the Internet". The work suggests that the "daily flood of visual data, no matter how randomly generated," is nonetheless considered by some visitors as an absolute, militant truth. Indeed, works curated into Nothing Was examined a sampling of visual information in order to reveal the Internet's new methods of disseminating information online.

The following year, Max Protetch Gallery showed Zero is the Center in its main gallery space, which received similarly positive reviews. "Siebren Versteeg's recent show, Zero is Center tore at the heart of our mythologies," Michelle Heinz wrote before describing how Versteeg's digital materiality and methods transverse the phenomenological space between the gallery and the outside world. Negative Shadow of a Fake Fire, for example, is composed of multiple parts: a waving fake flame sits between a projected light and scrim atop a crate while a video camera trained on the scrim captures its bouncing silhouette. "The choice to display the crate as part of the work takes Negative Shadow of a Fake Flame out of the context of the white cube," Heinz argued in her review of the show. Versteeg has indicated that the work demonstrates how layers of mediation impact visual understanding.

Making its debut in Zero is the Center, Versteeg's New York Windows (2008) continuously generates a digital collage painting. The work indiscriminately sources its digital material by searching Google Images for randomly generated phrases; then, a program executes brushstrokes on top of the collaged images. The work is rendered at a high resolution: 10242 x 10242 pixels. Just as contemporary histories of painting obsess about the materiality of painted surfaces, Versteeg maintains a similarly exacting attention to the resolution of his artwork's digital materials. Furthermore, the work is intended to be installed on a touchscreen display, so that the artwork may be precisely examined by Versteeg's audiences.

=== 2011 - 2020 ===
In 2016, the University of Michigan Museum of Art held a temporary exhibition called Siebren Versteeg: LIKE II, in which "a computer painting program creates a composition using a continuously changing algorithm, and then runs a periodic Google search to find a matching image online. Every sixty seconds, the painting made by the computer is uploaded to Google's 'search by image' feature, and images that most closely match the composition are then downloaded and displayed." Versteeg notoriously commented on the exhibit saying, "As the nature of the images presented by the work is random, the artist assumes both all and no responsibility for their presence and content". The artwork was also exhibited in a 2016 show of Invisible Threads: Technology and its Discontents, which was mounted by NYUAD Art Gallery in Abu Dhabi, UAE. In their curatorial notes, the organizers wrote that the work "enables us to take a critical look at our relationship with these systems of communication and trust in technology".

==== bitforms gallery ====
Versteeg participated in his first group exhibition at bitforms gallery in New York City's Chelsea neighborhood in 2013 under the title Vanishing Point. The artist contributed an algorithmically painted injet on canvas work titled _doorformsbitman_6000x6000_323 (2×3) to the show. Other artists curated into Vanishing Point include Annie Dorsen, Kyle McDonald, and Mungo Thomson.

The gallery also showed Versteeg's work in a 2014 group show titled Distrust That Particular Flavor; and, at NADA Art Fair in 2015, which earned a mention by Roberta Smith in The New York Times as not-to-be missed for its "terrific video" artworks.

Reflections Eternal, Versteeg's first solo exhibition at bitforms gallery, took place in 2017. Central to the show were three software programs that the artist developed: Today (2017), A Rose (2017), and Eye In The Sky (2017). In each of these works "the act of making a painting is distilled into the immeasurable potential of algorithms as well as the decision of when to make them stop".

Reflection Eternal earned strong reviews for Versteeg's algorithmically painted canvases. In Art in America, Brian Droitcour described A Rose (2017) as constructing "variations on Jay DeFeo's The Rose (1958-66)." An active program running on a computer in the gallery reveals a real brush leans against a monitor as an image moves past a window on the touchscreen beneath it. "The brush is motionless, but the digital canvas is supple, and the weight and direction of the marks shift as the pressure on the brush is changing. The floating image becomes a surrogate for the artist's hand". Likening Versteeg's software to "Painting's Terminator", Blake Gopnik said Versteeg's work takes "the piss out of the art world's ever-renewed obsession with pigment slapped onto canvas, and its tolerance for all the cliché that come with it".

During the COVID-19 pandemic, Versteeg presented In20%Memory, an email exhibition created for bitforms gallery that media scholar Charlotte Kent described as "a charmingly irreverent approach to exhibition possibilities while also quite seriously invigorating our musings on how we might exhibit work digitally. Being There is… a return to earlier work from 2004, Versteeg updates it with a current stream of CNN Live, interspersed with him seated in a waiting room staring dully at the screen, which sometimes reflects him. Occasionally black screens with the date and time appear, an homage to On Kawara". After the murder of George Floyd prompted international protests, Versteeg collaborated with Stephanie Syjuco and Jason Lazarus on PublicPublicAddress: A Nationwide Virtual Protest. The work sited a virtual protest in support of Black Lives Matter by depicting an endless stream of marching, crowdsourced images of protestors. Versteeg and his collaborators vowed to post edited images "into a moving collage of hundreds of other submissions" within 48 hours. The artwork was curated into Art In the Plague Year, a virtual exhibition in 2021.

==== Daily Times (Performer) (2012) in Rhizome's Net Art Anthology ====
In 2012, Versteeg created his work Daily Times (Performer), an important artwork that was published in Rhizome's Net Art Anthology. The artist instructed his program to create an abstract painting on top of the front page of The New York Times' daily print edition. After downloading the current front page, Versteeg's "software begins to render a painterly abstraction on top of the scan, stroke by stroke, continuously developing until the next days' edition is ready".

The anthology's critical analysis notes that the work prompts "questions of authenticity and fidelity also to painting itself: it is an uncanny, disembodied replica of the painting process, densely layered with carefully rendered brushstrokes such that it becomes impossible to locate where the distinction between this bot-made painting and an authentic work of art might lie, if anywhere at all". The anthology's curators note that in "reducing front-page news to purely aesthetic information and offering painterly gestures in response, the Daily Times (Performer)… [points] to the inherent malleability of online information and its openness to multiple interpretations".

Attendants to an installation of Daily Times (Performer) (2012) at the University of Denver report that upon arriving in the gallery, before the museum opens to the public, that "the screen has already been partially painted over". A reviewer of the installation stressed the importance of understanding Versteeg's art on a holistic level, observing that visitors "know they've seen a digitally manipulated piece of news, and yet the most interesting part about that experience is that they have no idea what the world decided to care about that day, but at least they got to see a pretty piece of art".

=== 2021-Present ===
Versteeg's work was curated into Jerry Gogosian's Suggested Followers: How the Algorithm is Always Right, a collecting exhibit at Sotheby's in October 2022 that takes its name from the tendency of Instagram to suggest followers to its users upon following an account. Versteeg consigned Today's Paper (with flies) (2019) to the exhibition, which shows a self-portrait of the artist reading a newspaper in front of a dumpster tagged with the artist's stenciled name. The newspaper's image updates with the latest edition after 24 hours, and as its news content stales, flies appear within the tableau with increasing frequency.

In March 2023, his NFT, For a Limited Time, was produced in partnership with Arsnl.Art. This was a year-long "artistic experiment" of generative artworks based on current trends in our society.

==== bitforms gallery ====
bitforms gallery began representation of the artist in 2022, on the occasion of Versteeg's second solo exhibition, mounted in 2022, Up The Ghost. Playing on the technological idiom "to give up the ghost", which refers to the moment a machine stops working. Artworks in the show "contend with apprehension and loss", a personal and cultural reference inspired by the death of the artist's father "as well as with the recent public engagements regarding digital ephemera and commodification". Multiple algorithmically painted works in the show demonstrated how Versteeg's practice engages with painting through ultra-high-resolution images that develop slowly over time, in complex detail, rather than quickly rendering comparably less-resolved pictures. In the press text, Versteeg said the painted artworks are "generated at a level of detail that surpasses the limitations of display technology as it currently stands".

One reviewer described Up The Ghost as a collection of "images generated by algorithms or software in various possible forms and applications" where "the complexity of the ideas being executed in each work becomes evident" the longer the viewer observes and considers each work. Exhibited in Up The Ghost, Versteeg's Possibly Living People (2022) demonstrates how the artist works through multiple iterations of a single, complex idea to arrive at a resolute form. Versteeg realized Possibly Living People in multiple formats between 2019 and 2022, although he credits Dodd Galleries as the work's initial patron. For example, the work also appeared in Versteeg's 2020 email exhibition In20%Memory as an image of a list of names on a standard gallery wall, foregrounded by a figure looking up at the names. The image is staged in a style that recalls pdf offer packages for contemporary artworks. In each iteration, Versteeg's work memorializes names from the Wikipedia Category Page titled Possibly Living People, an aggregation of once-noteworthy "individuals of advanced age (over 90), for whom there has been no new documentation in the last decade". In the work's 2022 version, names from the page flash across a screen in the style of Enter The Void (2009)'s introductory credits.

Using Open AI's Dall-E, Versteeg contributed A Continuous Slideshow of Images Returned from Searches for Sol LeWitt Wall Drawing Titles/Instructions (2022) to the gallery's San Francisco show of Artificial Imagination. Aligning with Versteeg's malleable practice, his work was said to have varied from its instructions: sometimes yielding "images that barely look like those of LeWitt and others that are very accurate".

== Critical reception ==
Siebren Versteeg engages with the history of painting through digital media. The artist previously explained that his interest in painting derives from its long-standing position among art academics as a litmus test for value, quality, and importance. Included in Rhizome's Net Art Anthology, Versteeg said that "the (digital pursuit of the) paint stroke, for me, becomes indicative of an impossible quest to encode the infinite. It's become a self-imposed methodology to try and think about the world in a phenomenological way".

Versteeg physically realizes his algorithmically generated paintings by printing the digital compositions on canvas. Despite coding fluid paint trails into the compositions and occasionally sealing the canvases, even the artist's physical objects contain indicators of their digital origins: the printed painting's flatly-rendered surfaces recall a methodically machined pattern. An early review of Versteeg's work in the Boston Globe concludes that building off of painting's legacy with digital media is "an awkward pairing… but, just as likely, we're not used to it".

Furthermore, a recent review of Versteeg's Up The Ghost at bitforms gallery in 2022 praised the artist's uncanny use of projection mapping as confounding the materiality of the artist's digitally printed canvases. By problematizing the painted canvas in Up The Ghost, the journalist continued, Versteeg's work questions the very nature "of painting's relationship to physical and digital realities".

Speaking to a 2019 work titled Possibly Living People, Versteeg has described his recent practice as an investigation into the "voracious appetite for inclusion and affirmation that life online exposes" which "can be seen as analogous to the need for object or artifact that we all too often understand as a prerequisite of art".

== Collections ==
Versteeg's work is included in the collections of the Whitney Museum of American Art in New York City; the Chicago Video Data Bank; the RISD Museum; The Albright-Knox Art Gallery in Buffalo, New York; the Hirshhorn Museum in Washington, DC; The Marguilies Collection at the Warehouse in Miami, Florida; the Museum of Contemporary Art, Chicago; the Ulrich Museum of Art in Wichita, Kansas; and, the Yale Art Gallery in New Haven, Connecticut.
