= Elisabeth Condon =

American painter

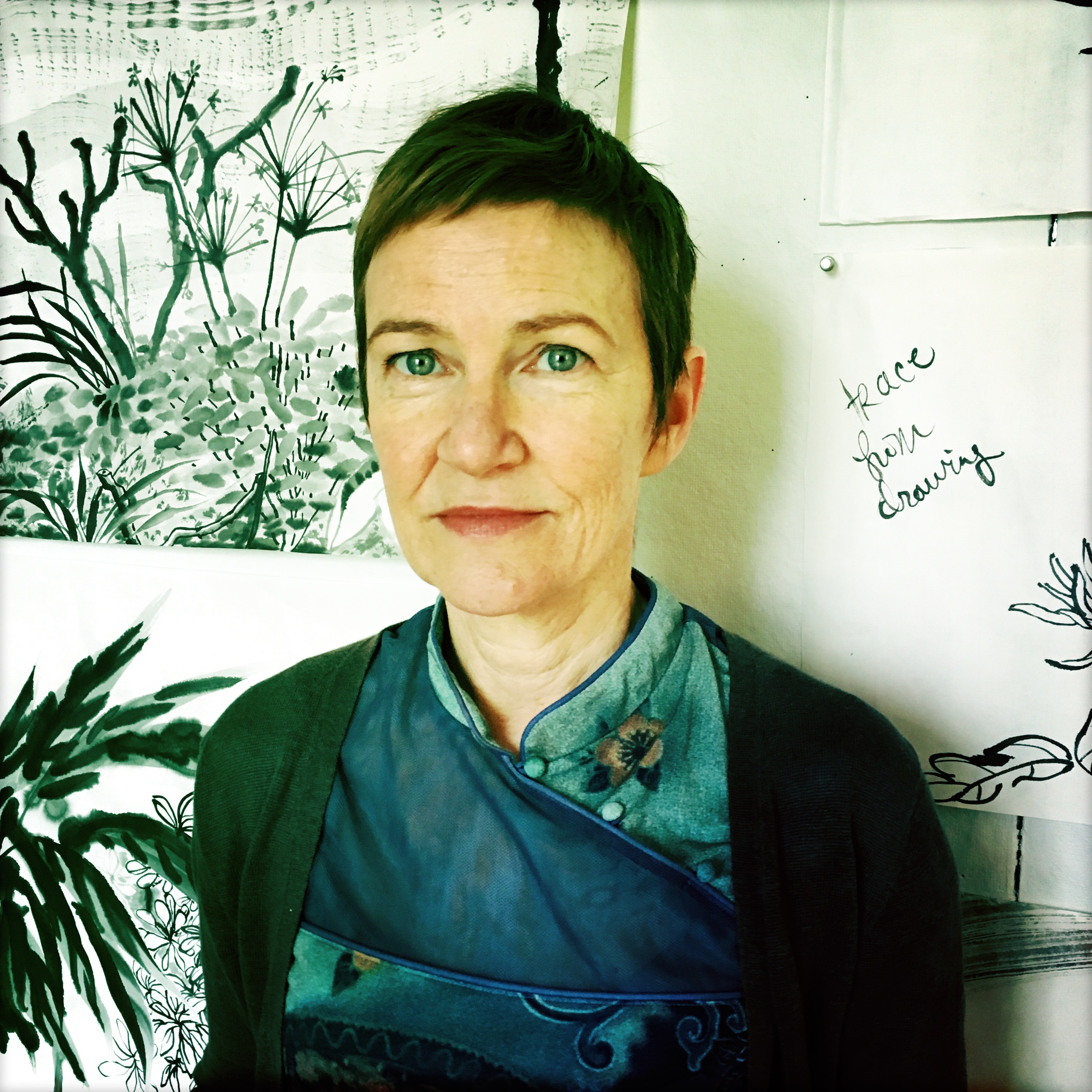
- Artist Elisabeth Condon
- Born: Los Angeles, California, United States
- Education: Otis Art Institute of Parsons School of Design, the School of the Art Institute of Chicago
- Known for: Artist
- Website: elisabethcondon.com

Elisabeth Condon (born 1959) is a contemporary American painter who combines natural imagery, the built environment, and abstraction in her free-flowing synthetic landscapes.

Vivid color palettes and contrasting organic and geometric shapes characterize Condon's work. So too does a deliberate mixing of painting techniques, from careful rendering to loose gesture. Indeed, Condon seems to intentionally defy adherence to any single standard. Forms, places, and times move seamlessly into one another, transformed and organized by a sense rhythm divorced from reality. In her depictions of stacked spaces, history and geography are collapsed. The landscapes depicted are both themselves altered by human interaction, and the ensuing paintings feel like idiosyncratic records of Condon's mind and her imaginings of the space. As one critic puts it: "the result feels like a dream or memory suddenly, if fleetingly, made visible." Viewing Condon's paintings, imbued as they are with this intense personal quality, consequently feels "a bit like reading her diary: strangely disorienting at first, then disarming and familiar."

== Themes and motifs ==
=== Pastiche ===
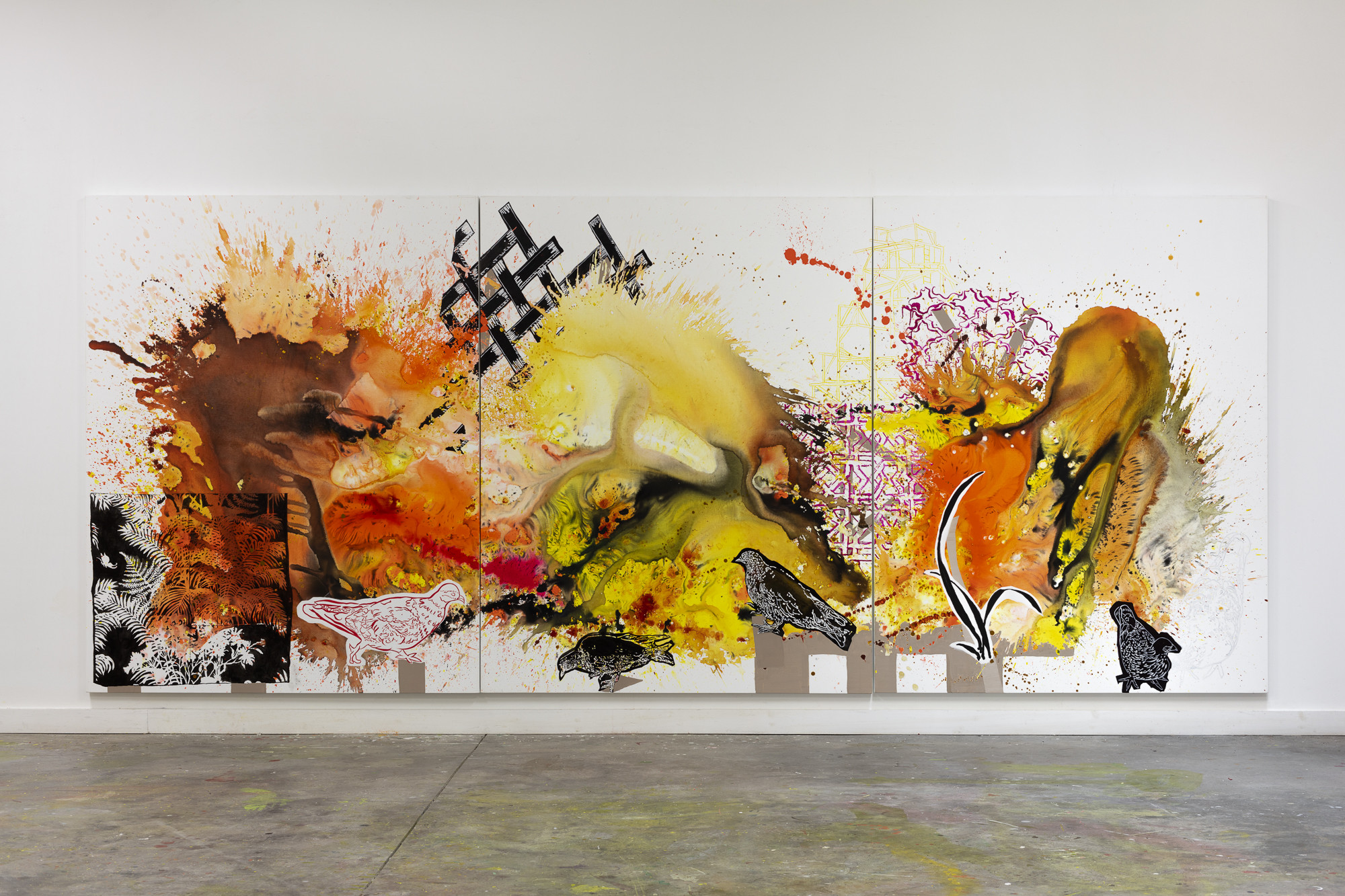
Effulgence by Elisabeth Condon

The concept of pastiche is critical to understanding Condon's practice. It is evident both in the range and unlikeliness of the source material she uses, and in her final compositions, which feel like odd remixes of painting styles that combine into something wholly new.

Condon draws inspiration from a wide variety of source material, from the 1970s LA glam rock scene to children's picture books to news photographs from the Iraq war. Critic Edward Gomez comments: "Her interests and influences are as diverse and unpredictable as her compositions are well-balanced and complete, even inevitable." The connections among her subjects often seem tenuous, but Condon is able to draw out unexpected similarities. "In lesser hands that might be a recipe for disaster" critic Van Siclen notes. "But Condon makes it work, deftly fusing the free-flowing, nonlinear perspective of Chinese painting with the free-flowing, nonlinear logic of the Seuss books."

Condon mixes both media and styles in her work. In addition to paint, she has employed Mylar sheets, metallics, glitter and rhinestones. She has command of a wide range of styles, from traditional landscape techniques to Chinese brush painting to patterning borrowed from graphic design, which makes "for multi-layered, exuberant work." The graphic layers act as a ground for her organic, sensual figures. She employs every use of paint handling from delicate transparent washes to thick impasto. And she borrows elements from art movements from disparate times and places, from ancient China to the French Informel to Color Field painting. One critic even compares her work to cartoons for the "bold colors and expressions."

Critics often comment on the difficulty of making such dissimilar elements work in a final composition: "It's a pastiche of four styles. The colors are weird. The abstract portions won't settle into their abstractness, and the figurative portions don't amount to anything recognizable. It looks like it was painted by committee. And yet the painting is working."

This mix of styles and influences is distinctly postmodern and expressive of the current technological environment, where input of ideas, news, and images from around the world is fast-paced and unceasing.

=== Chinese scroll painting ===
Born in Los Angeles, Condon was drawn to Asian culture and aesthetics filtered through home decor, Disney, and fantasy television. Through her travels and studies, Condon has become deeply influenced by ancient Chinese painting and philosophy, as well as the experience of living in modern Asian cities. In 2004, on a residency in Taiwan, she began to practice Chinese painting techniques, which emphasize variety in texture and inflection, as well as improvisation.

She draws from Yuan Dynasty scrolls the philosophy that a landscape painting is a portrait of an artist's inner life. She also borrows a complex sense of space and perspective, where different points of view are forged into one multi-layer and time-compressed experience. The resulting compositions have a real sense of space, but they are also puzzles, impossible to make sense of.

Condon learned sumi-e brush painting, which is as much a mediation practice as it is a painting technique, where form and gesture are united in a single stroke: "the form is created from gesture. It's all about the quality of line. In western art, it's all about volume." She often depicts "the four gentlemen" of Chinese painting: bamboo, orchid, chrysanthemum, and plum blossom.

In discussion of her own work, she often mentions the concept of emptiness and fullness, which she learned from sumi-e painting. Whereas the western painting tradition values contrast and opposition, Condon seeks a delicate balance between fullness and emptiness in her compositions.

She is also inspired by a splashed-ink method that can be found in some painting and pottery of the Later Tang Dynasty. She translates this ancient method into her modern take on paint pouring.

=== Paint pouring and direct experience ===
Condon often begins a composition with pouring acrylic or oil paint, so that the kinetic quality of the material creates unexpected forms and effects. Her use of paint has been compared to Jackson Pollock and Helen Frankenthaler (of whom Condon is a great admirer). Critic Franklin Einspruch comments on the essentialness of the paint pour to Condon's practice: "Pours are structural necessities in her work. They provide the primal soup from which her pictures emerge. Condon's pours are at the intersection of crossed axes, one between image and shape, the other between pattern and gesture, offering the potential in subsequent layers to transform into any of them."

She pairs uncontrolled blobs and trails of paint with her detailed renderings of buildings, trees, and flowers. Since she does not plan out compositions beforehand, forms seems emerge organically out of the accident of the pour and materiality of paint. Says Condon, "I'm completely spontaneous. I start with pours of paint, so that painting becomes like taking a trip, with contingencies and unexpected outcomes."

This accidental, transformational, action-based method contributes to a sense energy and directness to her work: "The dynamism of Condon's all-over compositions feels self-propelled, and it's easy to imagine them stretching far beyond their borders into an endless, gyrating flow of birds, plants and streams of luscious, electric, energized color."

The pours make the materiality of paint central to the finished work. As one critic puts it: the paint is a "torrent of material...[creating] a visual parallel to an unstoppable flood of water. This is what happens when paint is allowed to be just that, paint; it is thick, unwieldy and beautifully itself."

The energy in her paintings connects back to her fascination with Chinese art and the belief that a painting must have qi, or a vital life force.

=== Travel ===
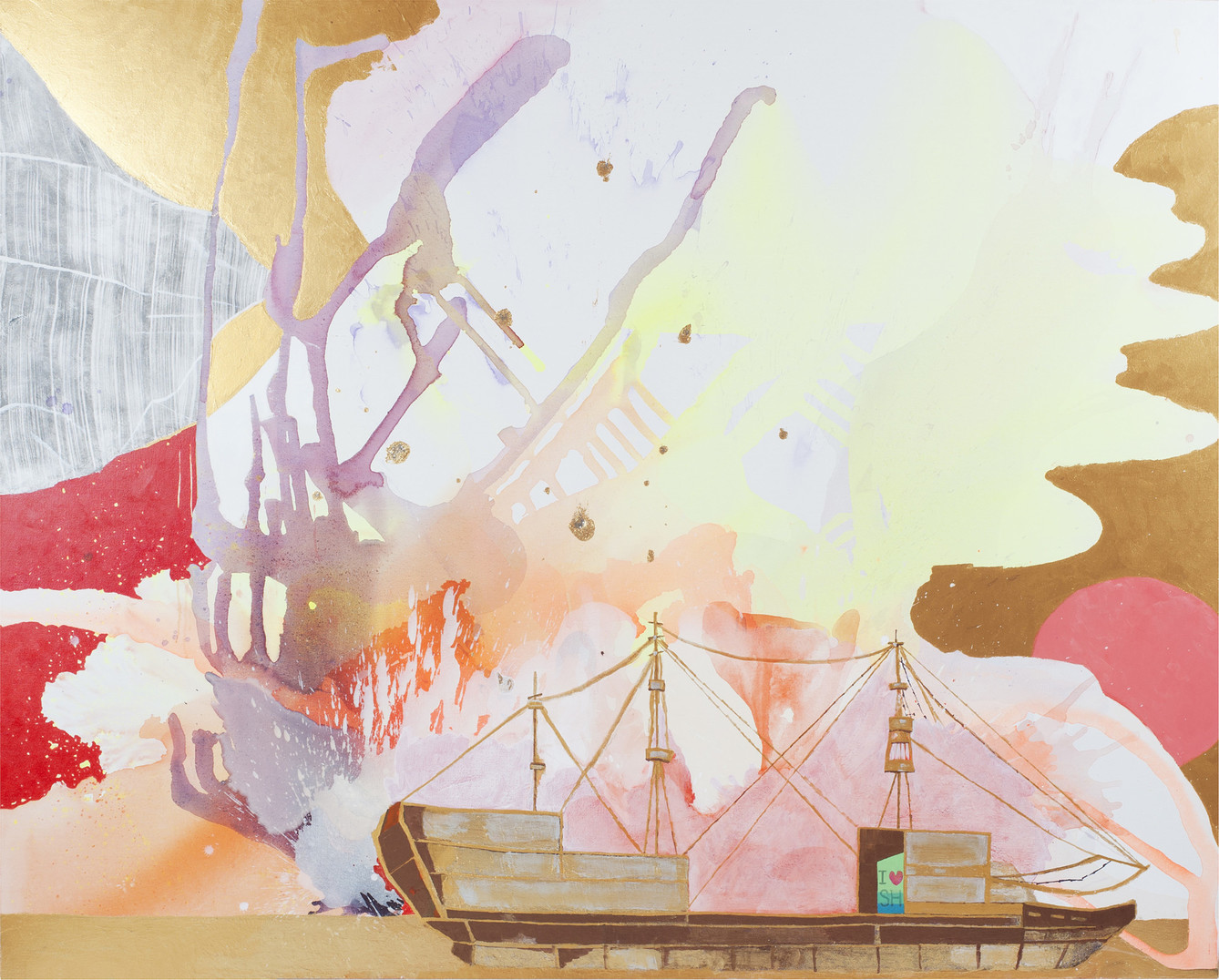
Painting Elephant Path by Elisabeth Condon

The theme of place is crucial to her work. Condon travels frequently for artist residencies, and her globetrotting is evident in her paintings. Each new place works its way into her psyche and becomes a new layer or reference. "The idea of the pour as violent and sudden and the reconstruction out of that shock echoes the concept of modern travel," Condon said. "Your whole ethos is impacted by where you are."

Her landscapes feature references to places as far away as Taiwan, Beijing, and Australia, as well as her native California and homes in Florida and Manhattan. She incorporates imagery from environments as diverse as the Everglades to the Grand Canyon to dense urban spaces.

One painting can contain myriad spaces or timelines layered over one another: "Paintings hide beneath paintings in each painting. The surfaces build from stain to film to opacity. The imagery crosses from east to west coast, and east to west hemisphere, with the ease and speed of ideas."

=== Femininity ===
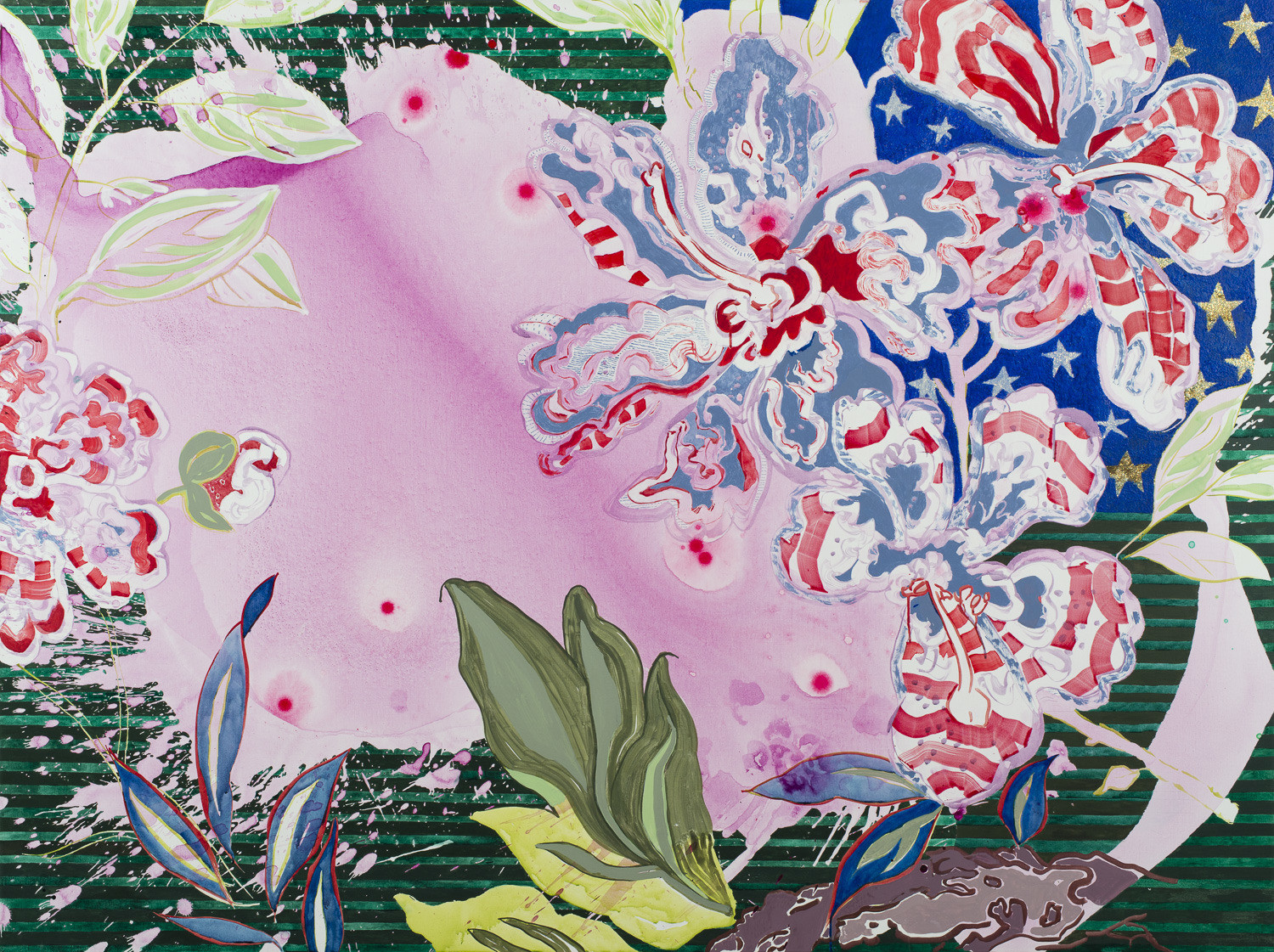
Love, American Style by Elisabeth Condon

In the wake of her 2014 residency in Shanghai, Condon has been embracing imagery that is considered feminine or kitsch such as flowers and birds. In Shanghai she recognized the importance of decoration to the urban landscape and classical Chinese painting.

Reexamining her experience from a feminist perspective, she began drawing inspiration from suburban home decor. She reconsidered her mother's "obsessive decorating" of her childhood home, an aesthetic that had at one time been only a symbol of her family's stifling conservatism, and transformed it into an important element of her work. She now uses vintage wallpaper patterns as a visual element in her work, and recounts asking her mother for leftover wallpaper and fabric samples to use in her studio. The plum blossom in particular is not only of central importance to Chinese art, it also appeared on the wallpaper of her childhood bedroom.

With their domestic references, sumptuous colors, floral imagery, and use of pretty materials like glitter, her paintings engage with the world's disdain for a certain gender, class, and aesthetic taste. Like other Pattern and Decoration Artists, Condon reclaims her personal experience and love of beauty, asserting the importance and potential for intellectual rigor in such work. It is particularly powerful to use such imagery in large-scale, abstract work, a painting tradition that is dominated by men, expressing the feminist emphasis on personal experience, rather than a pure vision of an overarching narrative that is the project of abstract expressionism.

In the current political climate and in the wake of the #metoo Movement, "these are also deceptively political paintings. The decorative here in Condon's painting serves as a formal device and a marker of "feminine" identity asserting itself against a culture of reactionary values."

Condon says of her own use of flowers: "The fleeting lifespan of flowers is mirrored by our own, as well as our environment and history. Flowers are sexual, feminine, autonomous, and dismissed as minor. As such they dwell in the margins, free from scrutiny. My flowers are fissured, on the brink of collapse; glowing with internal light, like fire, before they curdle and die."

== Early work ==
In her earliest professional work, Condon made dolls portraits- as she describes it, as a method of recreating her childhood. However, the paintings were about more than nostalgia for a time of innocence. The paintings are described as both funny and unsettling: "ambiguity and conflict are recurring themes... Elisabeth Condon's deceptively decorative paintings are hardly distinguishable from the children she depicts, blurring the distinction between reality and fantasy."

== Public work ==
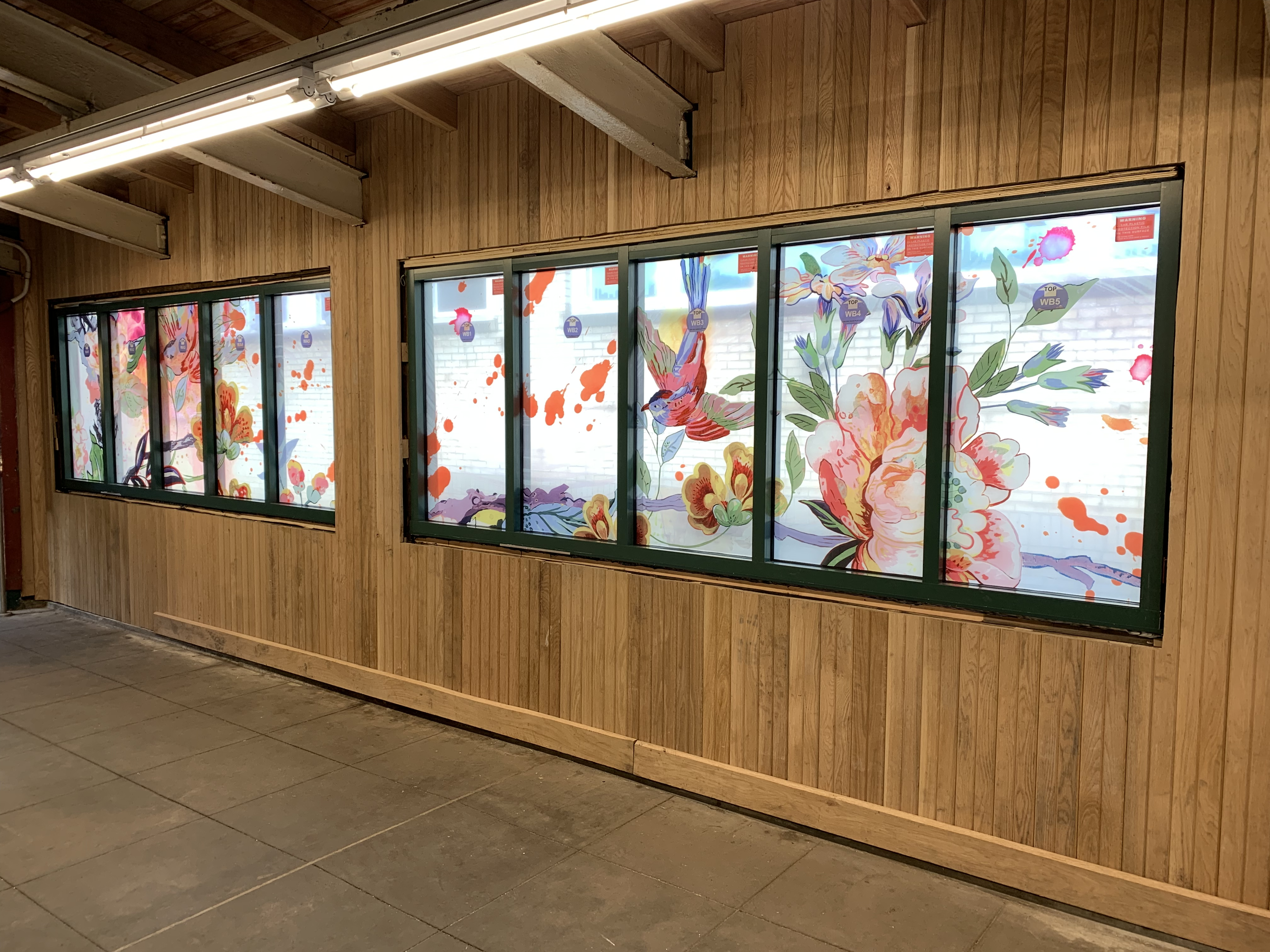
Urban Idyll at Astoria–Ditmars Boulevard station

Condon's first major public commission was at the Tampa Airport in 2017. In 2018 Condon installed a permanent public work at the Astoria–Ditmars Boulevard station, commissioned by MTA Arts & Design. The piece, entitled Urban Idyll, consists of thirty-six laminated glass panels that are translations of elements from her paintings. The theme is the Tree of Life, and it features birds, leaves, and flowers. Reflecting Astoria's cinematic history, the long, linear compositions recall sheet music or film frames.

== Bio ==
Elisabeth Condon was born in Los Angeles. She completed her BFA in Painting at Otis Art Institute of Parsons School of Design in 1986, as well as studying at UCSD for 1 year and UCLA for 2 years. She completed her MFA in Painting at the School of the Art Institute of Chicago in 1990 before moving to Brooklyn in 1992. She has taught extensively in Florida, and travelled widely for research and residencies. She curates exhibitions about topics that are relevant to her own practice, including paint pouring and contemporary reinterpretations of classical Asian painting. Condon has also run an art criticism blog, Raggedy Ann's Foot, since 2007.

== Career ==
Condon has exhibited extensively in the US and internationally since 1998.

She has participated in over 20 residencies and fellowships in Beijing, Taiwan, Shanghai, Spain, and the UK, along with locations across the United States, notably the MacDowell Colony in Peterborough, NH; the Everglades National Park; the Grand Canyon National Park; Yaddo in Saratoga Springs, NY; the Vermont Studio Center in Johnson, VT; and Ox-Bow School of Art and Artists Residency in Saugatuck, MI

Selected Grants 2007 Pollock Krasner; 2008 Florida Individual Artist Fellowship; 2015 NY PULSE Prize (booth Emerson Dorsch); 2015 New York Studio School Mercedes Matter Alumni Award; 2018 Joan Mitchell Foundation Painters & Sculptors Program Grant; and a Joan Mitchell Center Residency in 2024.

Public Collections include: Art in Embassies Program (2008), Girls Club Collection (2008), JP Morgan Chase Art Collection (2015 and 2017), Martha and Jim Sweeny Collection of Contemporary Prints by American Women at Museum of Fine Arts, Saint Petersburg, FL (2015), Tampa Museum of Art (2016), and Perez Art Museum Miami (2017).
