= Locust Projects =

Alternative art space in Florida, US

Coordinates: 25°48′44.6″N 80°11′44.1″W

Locust Projects is a nonprofit alternative art space located in Miami, Florida. The space was created in 1998 by three artists Westen Charles, COOPER and Elizabeth Withstandley. The space was created to serve as a place for contemporary artists to create site specific works outside of the commercial gallery system. Locust Projects was one of the first spaces to open in Miami's Wynwood area, which has since turned into a vibrant arts district. In 2000 the artist-run space became incorporated, formed a board of directors and in 2002 became an official not for profit 501(3)(C).

Locust Projects is currently located in 297 NE 67th St, Miami, FL 33138.

== History ==
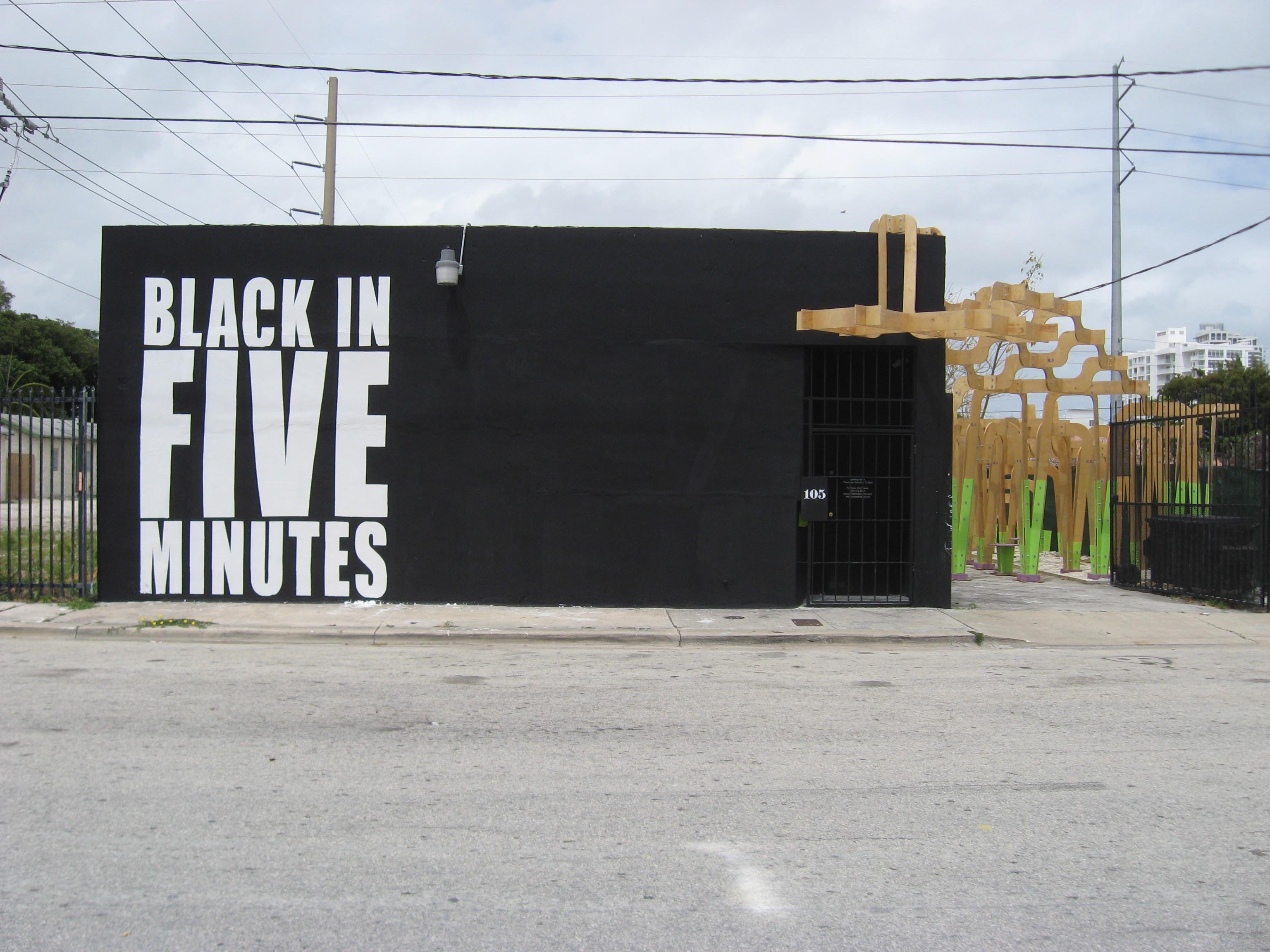
Ed Young mural at the original Locust Projects space in Wynwood, Miami 2008

Westen Charles, COOPER and Elizabeth Withstandley met at Pratt Institute in Brooklyn, NY in the early 1990s. After undergraduate school the three kept in touch and in the late 1990s they discussed starting an artist run exhibition space in Miami, Florida. At the time, Miami had a small art community and didn’t have much to offer in the way of exhibition spaces. During a meeting in Tuscaloosa, Alabama in 1997, the three discussed calling the space Locust Projects. After COOPER and Elizabeth Withstandley received their MFA’s from The University of Alabama they headed to Miami to meet up with Westen Charles who was finishing up his graduate degree at The University of Miami. In 1998 the three found a warehouse in an area of Miami called Wynwood, a then dilapidated and forgotten area of Miami. They rented a 3500-squarefoot warehouse at 105 NW 23rd Street, across from a Salvation Army rehabilitation center, nestled between a bus yard and an empty lot. With their own funds they renovated the warehouse which had previously been used as a wood shop for a custom woodworking business.

In the spring of 1999, Westen Charles inaugurated the space with its first show called “Pigs and Lint”. In late 1998 and early 1999, the founders contacted artists and invited them to exhibit in the space which began the first few years of programming. They also advertised an open call to artists to submit proposals. From the open call and from contacting artists that they felt should show in Miami they selected artist such as Tatiana Garmendia, LOIS (a Canadian artist collaborative group), Miami based artist David Rohn, Ilona Malka Rich and Randy Moore. They invited artists that wouldn’t have otherwise exhibited in Miami due to the lack of non-commercial spaces. Since the Wynwood area was essentially an abandoned neighborhood they hired off duty police officers for all of the gallery openings. After the first few years they expanded the space to enable two-person shows. During that time supporters in the community discussed ways they could help the artist-run space and provided guidance on how to create a lasting institution. Dennis & Debra Scholl suggested that the organization should form a board of directors and file to become an official not-for-profit 501c3. Dennis Scholl served as the first Director of the board.
