= Elizabeth Withstandley =

American artist and filmmaker

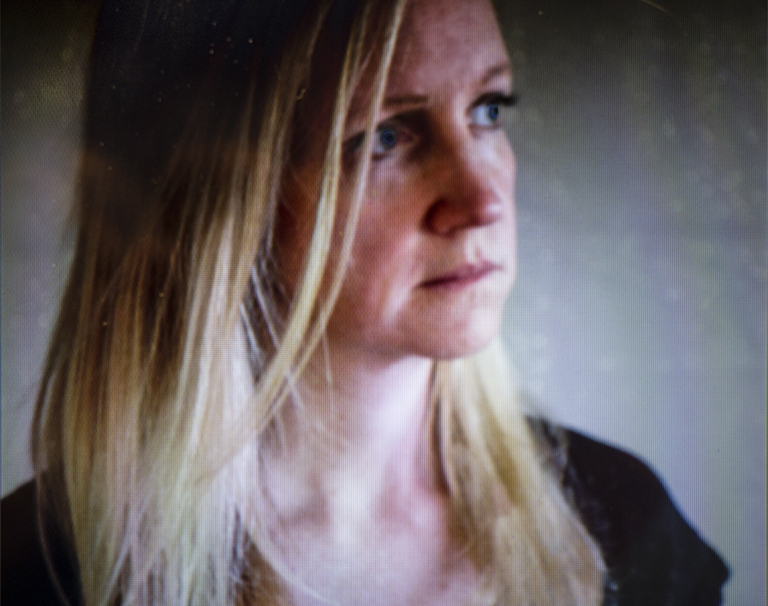
- Education: Pratt Institute
- Known for: photography, video, film installation,
- Website: http://www.withstandley.com

Elizabeth Withstandley is an American visual artist and filmmaker from Cape Cod, Massachusetts who lives and works in Los Angeles. Her work is multidisciplinary including photography, film, video and installation art. She is one of the co-founders of Locust Projects a not-for-profit art space in Miami, Florida and Prospect Art in Los Angeles, CA.

== Background ==
Her work has been shown at the Museum of Contemporary Art in North Miami, Florida; The Moore Space, Miami, Florida; Winslow Garage, Los Angeles; the Torrance Art Museum; Dimensions Variable Miami, Florida and Antenna Gallery in New Orleans.

Her work explores individuality and identity. Her work "You Can Not Be Replaced" is a two-channel video installation that shows all 82 current and former members of The Polyphonic Spree and asks the viewer to question the idea of individualism. The idea of individualism and identity are common themes throughout her work. She organized the exhibition Smoke & Mirrors at the Torrance Art Museum with the artist Gioj De Marco in 2018. Thirteen artists were included in the exhibition exploring the line in between fact and fiction. Withstandley presented The Real Brian Wilson, a two-channel HD projection with digital artifacts in the exhibition. "The Symphony of Names: No Man is an Island" is a video installation with ten-channel audio that was included in In-Sonora 11 in Madrid, Spain. Her three-channel video installation "Searching for the Miraculous" was included in exhibitions at the AC Institute and The Curfew Tower in Northern Ireland. Her works "The Real Brian Wilson" and "The Symphony of Names: No Man is an Island" are featured in a traveling exhibition called To Be Named organized by the Smithsonian's Recovering Voices Program and Experimental Humanities Collaborative Network at Bard.
