= Cheryl Pope =

American visual artist

Cheryl Pope is an American visual artist who works in sculpture, installation, and performance.

== Biography ==
Pope received her BFA in 2003, and in 2010 completed her Masters in Design: Fashion, Body, and Garment, both at the School of the Art Institute of Chicago. She spent 12 years studying under artist Nick Cave, and in 2015 she received a 3Arts award in recognition of her excellence in the visual arts. She currently lives and works in Chicago, Illinois, as both a practicing artist and a boxing instructor.

== Work ==
Through her work, Pope seeks to examine issues of race, gender, and other social issues. Pope's MD thesis, The Games We Play, featured a circle of tube socks that viewers could toss coins into. On each sock was written a word from Chicago teens that represented a binary. This installation also featured a sound component, where the voices of teens could be heard from a cone in the center. The work is a combination of sculpture and performance that calls into question things left unsaid.

Just Yell, an ongoing project by Pope, seeks to address gun violence faced by youth in Chicago. Just Yell is a series of installations that frequently employs poetry and performance by high school students in Chicago as a way to work out issues in a non-violent way.

In 2019, she created a series of works in wool roving, which were shown at a solo show at the Monique Meloche Gallery in Chicago.
