= Hilde Lynn Helphenstein =

American art critic and influencer (1985–2026)

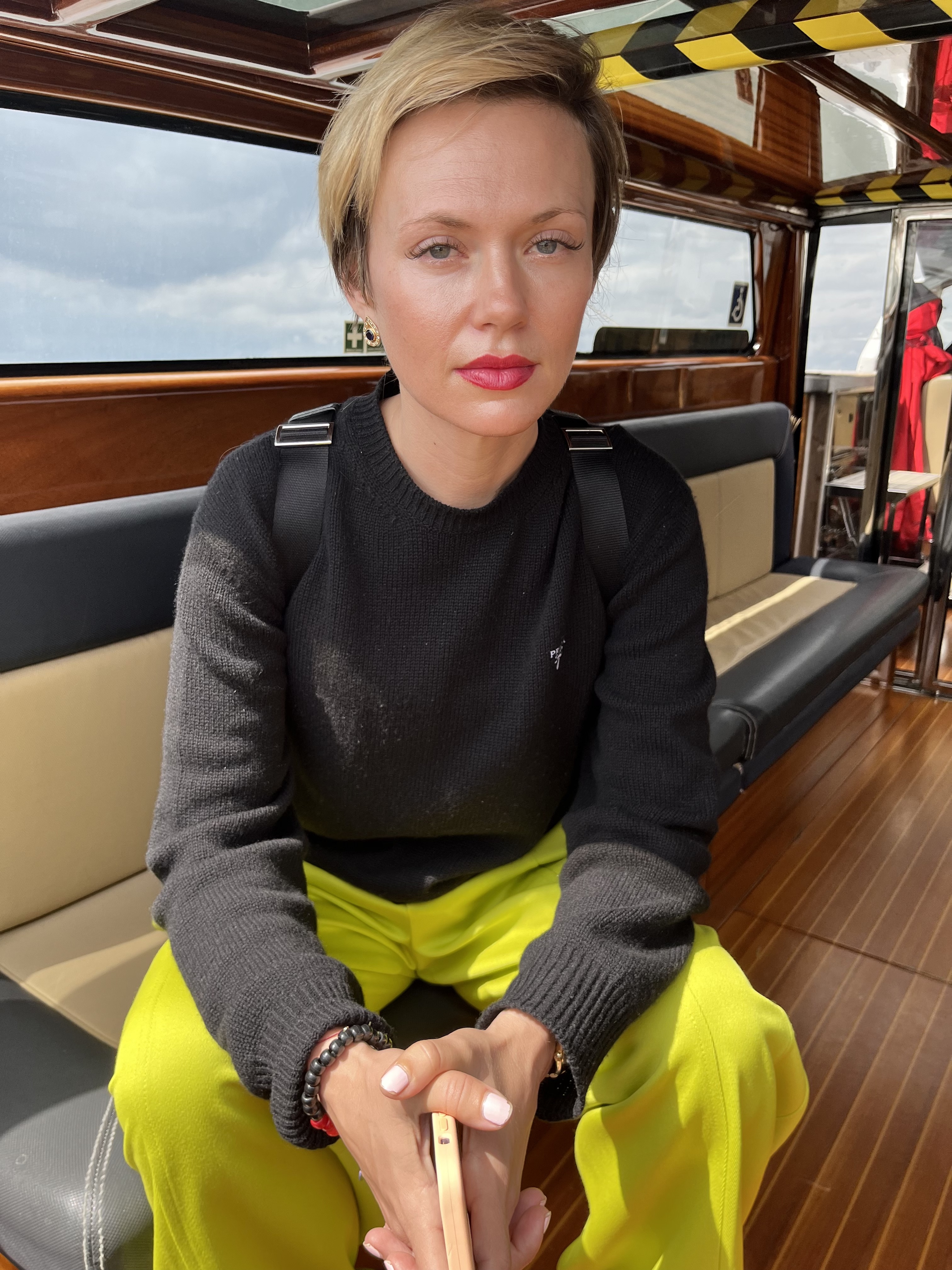
- Helphenstein in 2022
- Born: June 29, 1985; Oakland, California, U.S.
- Died: May 31, 2026 (aged 40); São Paulo, Brazil
- Education: HDK-Valand Academy of Art and Design; San Francisco Art Institute; New York University Stern School of Business
- Occupations: Artist, art critic and influencer

Instagram information
- Page: jerrygogosian
- Followers: 156 thousand

Substack information
- Notes: @jerrygogosian
- Last updated: June 3, 2026

Hilde Lynn Helphenstein (June 29, 1985 – May 31, 2026), also known by the pseudonym Jerry Gogosian, was an American artist, art critic and influencer.

== Life and career ==
Helphenstein was born in Oakland, California, to parents whose names she did not disclose, although she noted that her paternal relatives were of the House of Helfenstein. Her father was a businessman who, for a time, worked for USAID in Russia, and they lived in Yekaterinburg when she was a child. She was fluent in English, Norwegian and Russian, and studied at the HDK-Valand Academy of Art and Design in Sweden before earning a BFA degree at the San Francisco Art Institute. In 2025, she earned an MBA from the New York University Stern School of Business.

In 2016, with artist Derek Simons, Helphenstein opened the art gallery Hilde in Los Angeles. In early 2018, an illness forced her to close the gallery. She moved to Florida and that September, while recovering, she created her Instagram account, under the pseudonym 'Jerry Gogosian', using the combined names of Jerry Saltz and Larry Gagosian. Her stated goal was to be "the Anthony Bourdain of the art world". Her account gained popularity for her comments on art and her satirization of the art world. In 2021, her identity was revealed by the writer Kenny Schachter.

As Helphenstein was unable to monetize her account, she collaborated with large brands, including On, BMW, Ruinart, Matches Fashion and Edition Hotels, mainly as an event organizer. In 2022, she curated an online show of works by emerging artists at Sotheby's.

In 2024, Helphenstein signed with United Talent Agency. In 2025, she retired her Gogosian account, stating: "I have so loved and enjoyed being Jerry, but it is time to let it go". She acted as manager of artist Steve Hash and exhibited her own paintings at a gallery in Palm Beach, Florida. She also hosted the podcast Art Smack, and blogged about art-sector politics, industry friendships, and her struggles with depression. As of June 3, 2026, she had 156,000 followers.

== Personal life and death ==
Helphenstein was engaged to art dealer Matthew Capasso in the early 2020s. They purchased a home together in 2022 in Connecticut before ending their relationship in early 2025 and selling the property.

On May 31, 2026, at the age of 40, Helphenstein was found dead at the Rosewood Hotel in São Paulo, where she was recovering from plastic surgery. On the previous evening, the hotel had filed a formal complaint against her and her friends, for their erratic behavior in the hotel restaurant. Drugs and alcohol were found in her room, and her death was investigated by police as "suspicious".
