= SsingSsing =

South Korean folk music band

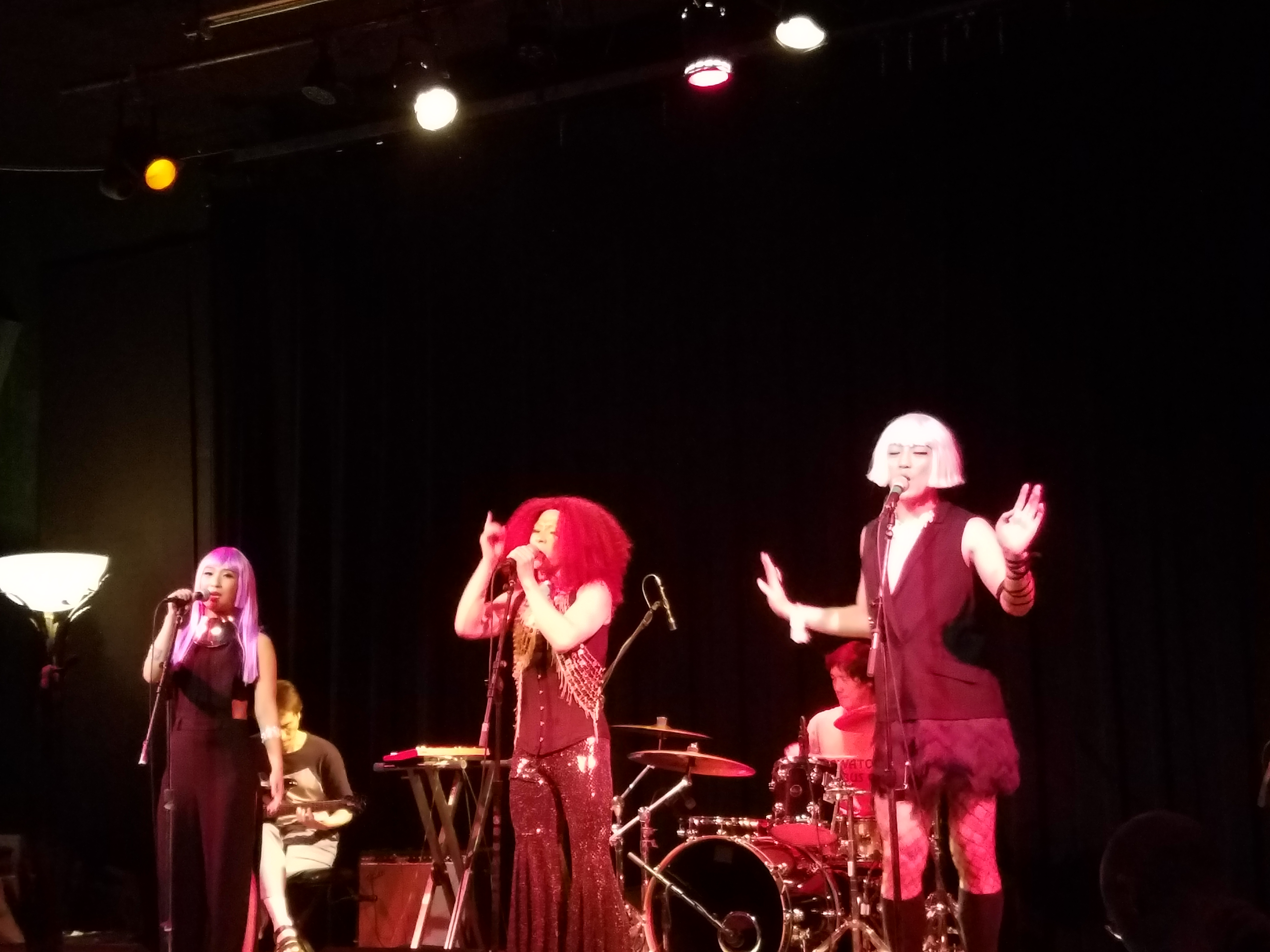
- SsingSsing performing at The Cedar Cultural Center in August 2017

Background information
- Origin: South Korea
- Genres: Rock; Korean traditional music (Gyeonggi minyo)
- Years active: 2010–2018
- Members: Lee Hee-moon; Jang Young-gyu; Choo Da-hye; Shin Seung-tae; Lee Chul-hee; Lee Tae-won

SsingSsing (Hangul: 씽씽) was a South Korean band that combined Korean folk music with glam rock, disco, and psychedelic rock. The band formed in 2010 and gained international attention in 2017 after performing on NPR’s Tiny Desk Concerts and Globalfest at Webster Hall. The band's six members included traditional singer Lee Hee-moon and music director Jang Young-gyu. SsingSsing disbanded in October, 2018. When asked about the band in 2019, Lee Hee-moon said "it is a project band that has disbanded. I loved being a part of it, but as of now, I do not have a plan to do it again."

== Artistry ==
=== Visual presentation ===
The band described their style as "authentic Korean traditional vocals with rock band music, combined with an extravagant visual style and stage manners."

SsingSsing’s performances often featured elaborate costuming and accessories. The singers dressed in drag to reinterpret old Korean shaman traditions in what The New York Times describes as an "irreverent but intriguing hybrid." Music critics Anastasia Tsioulcas and Bob Boilen in NPR’s All Songs Considered described SsingSsing as "very glam, very rock and roll and very ready to play with the concept of gender. Because male shamans in Korean traditional art need to channel male and female spirits, the men in the band cross-dress."

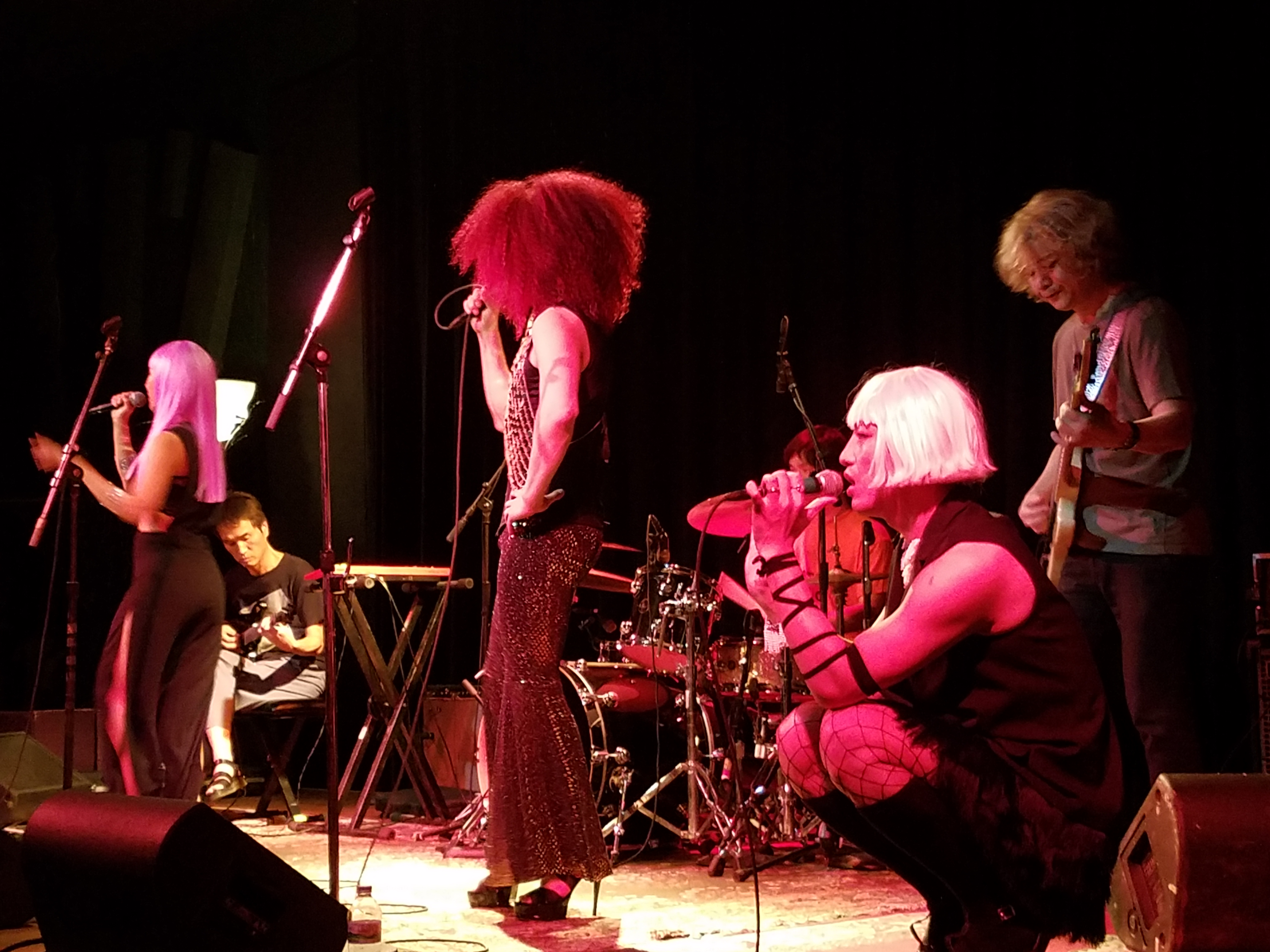
In 2017

Vocalist Hee-moon Lee has elaborated on SsingSsing's trademark appearance, noting that the drag elements were more than just cosmetic:

"In Korean traditional art, male shamans, called baksu, have the body of a male. But as mediums, they need more than a single sexual identity, because they're channeling both male and female spirits. When I act a female character and sing, I have to overcome the fact of my being a male sorikkun (singer), and try my utmost to bring a more neutral, unisex feeling to the performance".

=== Musical style ===
SsingSsing incorporates gyeonggi sori, a folk style of singing which originates from the central province around Seoul. Gyeonggi sori is recognized as one of the important Intangible Cultural Assets of Korea (Asset #57). Other styles present in their music are seodo sori, which originates from the northwest provinces of North Korea, Hwanghae and Pyeongan folk songs, and the shamanistic-ritual based seoul gut.

Heewon Kim called attention to the rural elements of SsingSsing's use of folk minyo style: "we can try to define the band’s genre as alternative Minyo rock. Minyo is characterized by its emphasis on strong vocal lines and lyrics that sing about peasant lives."

The Ministry of Foreign Affairs of Korea noted that "in a fast-growing society where people tend to stray away from traditional rituals, SsingSsing brings them back in touch with the cultural roots of Korea through a very playful style, accessible for 21st century urban citizens."

SsingSsing received accolades for bringing Korean music beyond K-Pop to global audiences.

== Members ==
- Lee Hee-moon (vocals)
- Jang Young-gyu (music director, bass guitar)
- Choo Da-hye (vocals)
- Shin Seung-tae (vocals)
- Lee Chul-hee (drums)
- Lee Tae-won (electric guitar)

== Discography ==
=== Extended plays ===
Title	Album details
SSINGSSING	Released: August 7, 2017; Labels: Leeway Music & Media, Monday Brunch; Format: CD, digital download; Track listing: 1. 사시랭이소리 (Note: sasiraengisori); 2. 청춘가 (Note: cheongchunga); 3. 노랫가락 (Note: noraetgarak); 4. 산염불 (Note: sanyeombul)
