= Cooper (artist) =

American artist

- Born: Brian Cooper; 1976 (age 49–50); Miami, Florida
- Known for: Installation art, performance, photography, sculpture, film, video, sound

Cooper (stylized as COOPER; born Brian Cooper, 1976) is an American artist known for sculptures and assemblages He lives and works in Alaska.

== Early life ==
Cooper was born and raised in Miami, Florida. He changed his name to a mononymous title in all capital letters in 1993. Graduated from the New World School of the Arts in 1995, received a BFA from the Pratt Institute in 1997, and an MFA from the University of Alabama, Tuscaloosa in 1999.

== Career ==
Cooper's work has been published in Miami Contemporary Artists by Paul Clemence, Julie Davidow, and Elisa Turner and in Bonnie Clearwater's book Making Art in Miami, Travels in Hyper-reality, as well as Art in America, Sculpture Magazine, Art Papers, ArtNews, The New York Times, The Village Voice, Santa Fe Reporter and The Miami Herald.

Cooper's works are in the Rubell Family Collection and Miami Art Museum in Miami, Florida. In 2002, he received a Miami-Dade County site-specific arts commission.

In March 2005, the Fredric Snitzer Gallery in Miami exhibited Cooper's solo show titled "Whiskey for a Red Dawn" at which the Museum of Contemporary Art North Miami, acquired a large scale drawing titled "The finest palaces always make the most impressive ruins. So spend your money as fast as possible, and always use some sort of gold appliqué." Art writer Jocelyn Adele Gonzalez comments, "The work is simultaneously humorous and distressing, and at some point lies on the edge of being socio-political."

In May 2007, Dwight Hackett Projects exhibited a solo show of Cooper's sculpture called "I see a Red Door and want to Paint it Black". This exhibition included the piece titled "Dead Ringer, Low E is the Sound of Black" consisting of a baby grand piano buried underneath the gallery in a makeshift concrete tomb, a live video image of the piano was viewable on a flat screen television above the buried chamber, and a single piano key could be reached by the audience via a ground penetrating sword-like protrusion.

== Awards and honors ==
- 2012: South Florida Cultural Consortium Fellowship for Visual and Media Artists
- 1997: Charles Pratt Scholarship, Pratt Institute, New York City, New York
