= Coope =

Coope is a surname. Notable people with the surname include:

- Miles Coope (1916–1974), English cricketer
- Octavius Coope (1814–1886), English politician
- Russell Coope (1930–2011), British palaeontologist
- Ursula Coope, British philosopher

== See also ==
- Coop (disambiguation)
- Coopes, a surname
- Coops, a surname
- Coop (surname)
- Cooper (surname)
