= Coop (surname) =

Coop is the surname of:

- Brianna Coop (born 1998), Australian Paralympic athlete
- Denys Coop (1920–1981), English cinematographer
- Elias Coop-Gonzalez (born 2002), American politician from West Virginia
- Franco Coop (1891–1962), Italian actor
- Graham Coop (born 1979), British-American population geneticist
- Isadore Coop (1926–2003), Canadian architect
- Jane Coop (born 1950), Canadian pianist and music pedagogue
- Jim Coop (1927–1996), English football player
- Mick Coop (born 1948), English footballer
- Oscar Coop-Phane (born 1988), French writer
- Thomas Coop (1863–1929), English dual-code rugby footballer
- Tony Coop (1934–2021), English golfer
- William G. Coop (1805–1874), American politician from Iowa

== See also ==
- Dan Coupe (1885–1954), English footballer
- Coopes, surname
- Coops, a surname
- Coope, a surname
- Cooper (surname)
- Koop (disambiguation)
- Coop (disambiguation)
