= Coop =

Coop or Co-op most often refer to:

- Chicken coop or other animal enclosure
- Cooperative or co-operative ("co-op"), an association co-operating for mutual social, economic or cultural benefit
  - Consumer cooperative
  - Food cooperative
  - Housing cooperative (as in "a co-op apartment")
    - Building cooperative
  - Worker cooperative
- Cooperative board game
- Cooperative video game
- Prison, in slang

Coop, COOP or Co-op may also refer to:

== Arts and entertainment ==
- Coop! The Music of Bob Cooper, a 1959 album
- The Co-op, a 1980s singer-songwriter cooperative that formed the Fast Folk musical magazine
- Original Cast Album: Co-Op, an episode of Documentary Now spoofing the 1970 D.A. Pennebaker documentary Original Cast Album: Company
- CO-OP (podcast), a weekly video podcast

=== Fictional characters ===
- Coop (Charmed), a fictional character from the television series Charmed and its franchise
- Cooper Bradshaw, in the soap opera Guiding Light, nicknamed "Coop"
- Marissa Cooper, in the television series The O.C., nicknamed "Coop"
- Coop, in the animated television series Megas XLR
- Coop Burtonburger, in the animated television series Kid vs. Kat
- The titular character of the film J. W. Coop, played by Cliff Robertson
- Dale Cooper, in the television series Twin Peaks, nicknamed "Coop"

== Businesses ==
=== Supermarket chains ===
- Co-op Atlantic, a chain of member-owned grocery stores in Canada
- Coop amba, Denmark
- Coop Eesti, a cooperative supermarket chain in Estonia
- Coop (Hungary)
- Coop (Italy)
- Coop (Netherlands)
- Coop Norge, Norway
- COOP (Puerto Rico)
- COOP group, group of consumer cooperatives in Czech Republic, ses Jednota cooperative
- Coop (Sweden)
- Coop (Switzerland)
- Co-op Food, United Kingdom
- CO-OP, a brand owned by Universal Cooperatives
- Federated Co-operatives, a western Canadian co-operative federation known for its "CO-OP" brand grocery stores
- COOP Jednota, Slovakia

=== Other businesses ===
- The Co-op Bookshop, an Australian bookstore chain
- The Co-operative brand, used by several UK co-operative businesses
  - The Co-operative Group, the largest co-operative in the UK
- CO-OP Financial Services, an interbank ATM network operating in Canada and United States
- Harvard/MIT Cooperative Society, nicknamed "The Coop", a cooperative campus store based in Cambridge, Massachusetts, United States
- Co-Op Society, retail grocery providers in Kuwait

== Education ==
- COOP exam, an admission test for American Catholic high schools
- Cooperative education, combining classroom learning with work experience

== Government and politics ==
- Coop-NATCCO, a political party in the Philippines
- Continuity of Operations Plan, a United States continuity of government initiative
- Craft of Opportunity Program, a Royal Australian Navy minesweeper acquisition program
- Labour Co-op, a description for British electoral candidates

== People ==
- Coop (surname), a list of people
- Coop (artist), American hot-rod artist Chris Cooper (born 1968)
- Davie Cooper, nicknamed “Coop”, Scottish international footballer (1956–1995)
- Gary Cooper, nickname for the American actor

== Other uses ==
- .coop, a sponsored top-level domain (sTLD) in the Domain Name System of the internet
- Cooperative Observer (COOP), a network of American volunteer weather observers
- Co-op Live, an arena in Manchester, England
- Allerton Coops, historic apartment building complex in the Bronx, New York
- "Co-op" or "Black op" for covert operation

== See also ==
- Coupé
- Coops, a surname
- Coopes, a surname
- Coope, a surname
- Cooper (surname)
- Cooperative (disambiguation)
- Koop (disambiguation)
- KO_OP, a Canadian video game studio
