= List of supermarket chains in Estonia =

This is a list of supermarket chains in Estonia. Based on the reports for the 2020 financial year, the market leader was Coop Eesti with 24.4 percent, Selver in second place with 18.3 percent, Maxima in third place with 17.6 percent, Rimi in fourth place with 13.4 percent, Prisma in fifth place with 6 percent, Grossi Toidukaubad in sixth place with 6 percent, seventh is Meie Toidukaubad with 2 percent, eighth is Keila Tarbijate Ühistu. The share of the remaining market participants in the total market is less than a full percent.

| Name | Stores | Type of stores | Parent |
|---|---|---|---|
| Selver | 72 | convenience store, supermarket, hypermarket | Tallinna Kaubamaja Grupp AS |
| Delice | 2 | supermarket | Tallinna Kaubamaja Grupp AS |
| Toidumaailm | 2 | supermarket | Tallinna Kaubamaja Grupp AS |
| Coop | 320 | convenience store, supermarket, hypermarket | Coop Eesti Keskühistu |
| Grossi Toidukaubad | 88 | convenience store, supermarket | OG Elektra AS |
| Bloom | 2 | dark store | Bloom Group OÜ |
| Bolt Market | 5 | dark store | Bolt |
| Meie Toidukaubad | 66 | supermarket, convenience store | RR Lektus AS |
| Aldar Market | 10 | convenience store | Aldar Eesti OÜ |
| A1000 Market | 13 | discount store | A1M OÜ |
| Foodmarket | 12 | convenience store | Pärnu Majandusühistu |
| Keila Consumer Cooperative stores | 11 | convenience store | Keila Consumer Cooperative |
| KariaMarket | 4 | convenience store | Karia OÜ |
| Biomarket | 10 | organic food store | Biomarket OÜ |
| Lidl | 22 | discount store | Schwarz Gruppe |
| Maxima | 85 | convenience store, supermarket, hypermarket | Maxima Group |
| PROMO Cash&Carry | 3 | cash-and-carry warehouse | Sanitex LLC |
| Rimi | 82 | convenience store, supermarket, hypermarket | Salling Group |
| Prisma Peremarket | 13 | supermarket, hypermarket | S Group |
| Stockmann | 1 | supermarket | Stockmann |
| R-Kiosk | 91 | convenience store | Reitan Group |
| MERE (Svetofor) | 1 | discount warehouse | Torgservis |
