= Köpp =

Köpp is a surname. Notable people with the surname include:

- Kristoffer Vassbakk Köpp Ajer, Norwegian footballer
- Leo Köpp, German racewalker
- Nils Köpp, German figure skater

== See also ==
- Koepp
- Koop (surname)
- Kopp (surname)
