= Coopes =

Coopes is a surname. Notable people with the name include:

- Jenny Coopes (born 1945), Australian political cartoonist, illustrator, and painter
- Rachael Coopes, Australian actress

== See also ==
- Coop (disambiguation)
- Coops, a surname
- Coope, a surname
- Coop (surname)
- Cooper (surname)
