= Koop (surname) =

Koop is a surname. Notable people with the surname include:

- Aire Koop (born 1957), Estonian actress
- Arnold Koop (1922–1988), Estonian historian, university rector
- Bill Koop (1906–1950), Australian footballer
- Doug Koop (born 1960), Australian footballer
- C. Everett Koop (1916–2013), US Surgeon General
- Mary Koop (1884–1967), British artist
- Volker Koop (1945–2022), German non-fiction author, opinion writer, and journalist
- Wanda Koop (born 1951), Canadian painter

== See also ==
- Koop (disambiguation)
- Coop (disambiguation)
- Koepp
