= Coops =

Coops is a surname. Notable people with this name include:

- Jeans Coops, Belgian bobsledder who competed in the late 1930s
- Pieter Coops (1640–1673), Dutch seascape painter
- Nicholas Coops, FRSC, Australian-Canadian remote sensing scientist and Canada Research Chair in Remote Sensing.

== See also ==
- Allerton Coops, historic apartment building complex in the Bronx, New York
- Coop (disambiguation)
- Coopes, surname
- Coope, a surname
- Coop (surname)
- Cooper (surname)
