= Kopp (surname) =

Kopp is a German surname. Notable people with the surname include:

- David Kopp (born 1979), German race cyclist
- Elisabeth Kopp (1936–2023), Swiss politician
- Emil Kopp (1817–1875), French chemist
- Georg von Kopp (1837–1914), German cardinal
- Georges Kopp (1902–1951), Belgian commander of Republican forces in the Spanish Civil War
- Hal Kopp (1909–1998), American college football coach
- Harry Kopp (1880–1943), American lawyer and politician
- Hermann Kopp (born 1954), German composer and musician
- Hermann Franz Moritz Kopp (1817–1892), German chemist
- James Charles Kopp (born 1954), American murderer
- Johann Heinrich Kopp (1777–1858), German physician
- Joseph Eutych Kopp (1793–1866), Swiss antiquarian (see Kopp, Joseph Eutychius, Encyclopedia Americana (1920)
- Magdalena Kopp (1948–2015), member of the Frankfurt Revolutionary Cells (RZ), wife and accomplice of Carlos the Jackal
- Nancy K. Kopp (born 1943), American politician
- Pavol Kopp, Slovak sport shooter
- Rudolph G. Kopp (1887–1972), Austrian composer
- Quentin L. Kopp (born 1928), American politician
- Regina Kopp-Herr (born 1957), German politician
- Sheldon Kopp (1929–1999), American psychotherapist
- Stephen J. Kopp (1951–2014), American university president
- Viktor Kopp (1880–1930), Russian and Soviet diplomat
- Wendy Kopp (born 1967), president and founder of Teach For America

== See also ==
- Köpp
- Köpping
