= Koop =

Koop or KOOP may refer to:

== People ==
- Koop (surname), multiple people

== Culture and entertainment ==
- Koop (band), a Swedish jazz duo consisting of Magnus Zingmark and Oscar Simonsson
- KOOP (FM), a radio station (91.7 FM) in Austin, Texas, United States
- "Never Koop a Koopa", a Super Mario Bros. television series episode

== Companies ==
- Koop Dairy, a dairy products company in Cyprus
- KO_OP, a video game studio

== See also ==
- Coop (disambiguation)
