= Koepp =

Koepp is a surname. Notable people with the surname include:

- David Koepp (born 1963), American screenwriter and director
- Jean-Pierre Koepp (1934–2010), Luxembourgish politician and restaurateur
- Stephen Koepp, American journalist
- Volker Koepp (born 1944), German documentary film producer

== See also ==
- Koop (surname)
- Köpp
