= Prisma (chain store) =

Finnish hypermarket chain

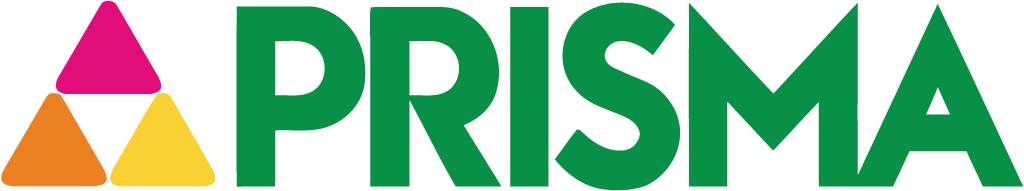

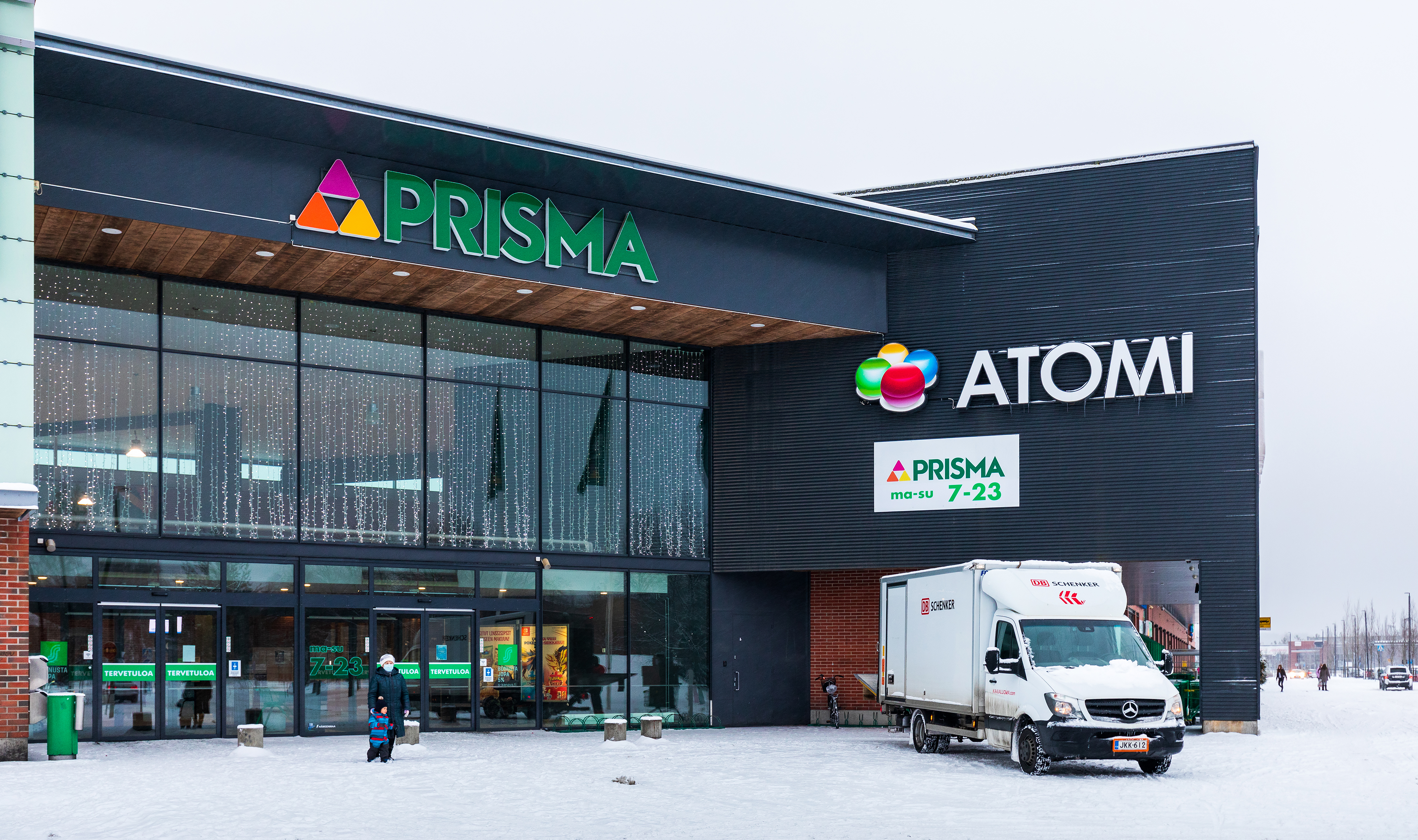
- Prisma branch in Riihimäki.
- Industry: Retail
- Founded: November 22, 1972
- Area served: Finland, Estonia
- Owner: S Group
- Website: https://www.prisma.fi/fi/prisma

Prisma is a Finnish chain of hypermarkets belonging to the S Group. In addition to food and groceries, Prisma's selection includes a wide collection of clothing, sporting goods, books, toys, entertainment and home accessories.

After validating its retail concept through the opening of its first store in Jyväskylä in 1972, the chain has grown to currently operate 74 stores across 51 cities in Finland, as well as 13 stores in neighboring Estonia. The brand previously was expanded with a presence in Latvia, Lithuania, and Russia; however, these operations were discontinued, with closures occurring in 2017 and 2022, respectively.

== History ==
In the past, the S Group's hypermarkets differed a lot from each other, as the cooperatives were allowed to choose their own concept. The names Sokos-market and Prisma, among others, were used. The S Group's first hypermarket, at the time called Sokos Market, was founded in 1971 along Tampereentie in Turku, but the following year, Jyväskylä's Seppälä Prisma was founded, and it got its name from a landmark built in connection with the car market, which looked like a prism. In the 1970s, Prisma/Sokos supermarkets were also opened in Kouvola, Oulu, Pori, Seinäjoki and Tampere, among others. The first Prisma in the Helsinki metropolitan area was opened in the Malmi district in 1987.

The current form of the Prisma chain was born in 1988, when the S Group had begun to consolidate its stores under national chains. SOK considered Prisma a successful name, so it was introduced in all of the S Group's hypermarkets, the product ranges and marketing of the stores were unified. At the end of 1995, there were a total of 28 Prismas in Finland.

Prisma's main competitor in Finland is Kesko's K-Citymarket chain.

=== Failed regional expansion ===
AS Prisma Latvija was founded on January 17, 2006, as a registered S-group in Finland. Its share capital was 5,150,800 euros. The chain stores in Latvia and Lithuania were closed in 2017. Prisma also has 14 hypermarkets in and around 5 cities in Estonia.

On March 4, 2022, Prisma's owner, the S-Group, announced the closure of all Russian operations.

In April 2026, Prisma reached a tentative agreement for sale of all 13 of its Estonian stores to the Coop Eesti cooperative.

== Gallery of Prisma stores ==
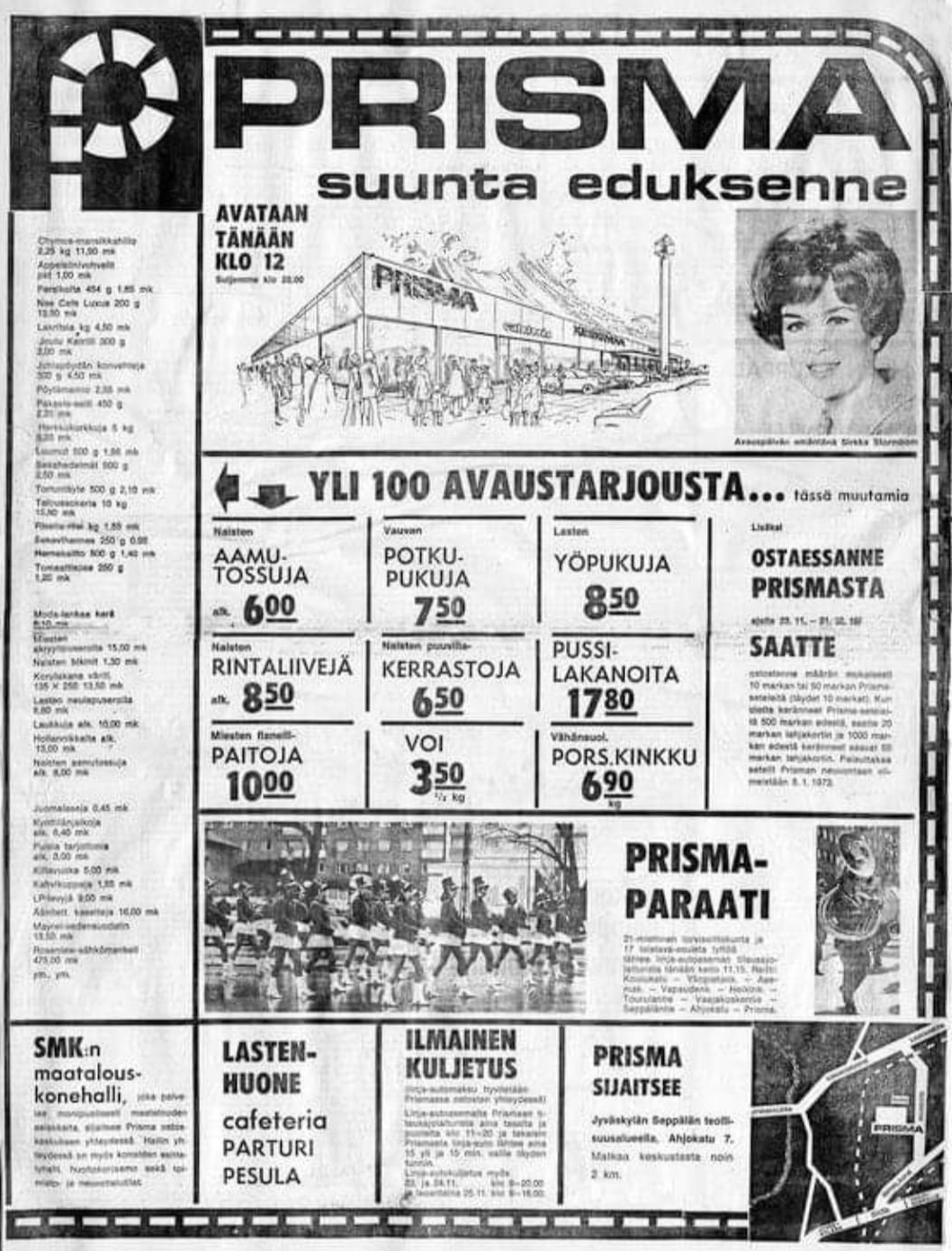
Advertising magazine of the first Prisma from 1972

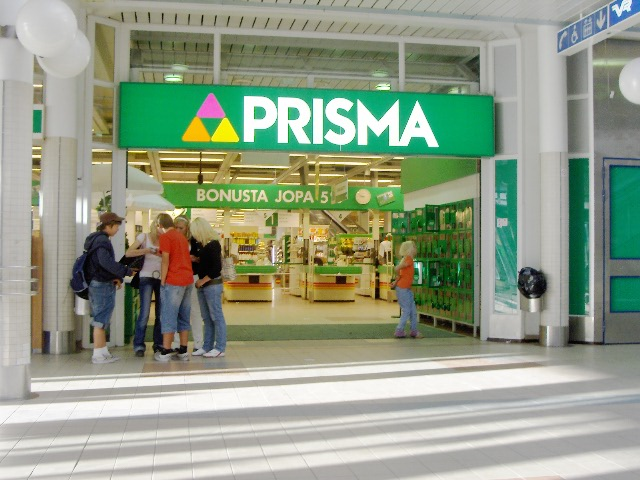
Helsinki: Malmi

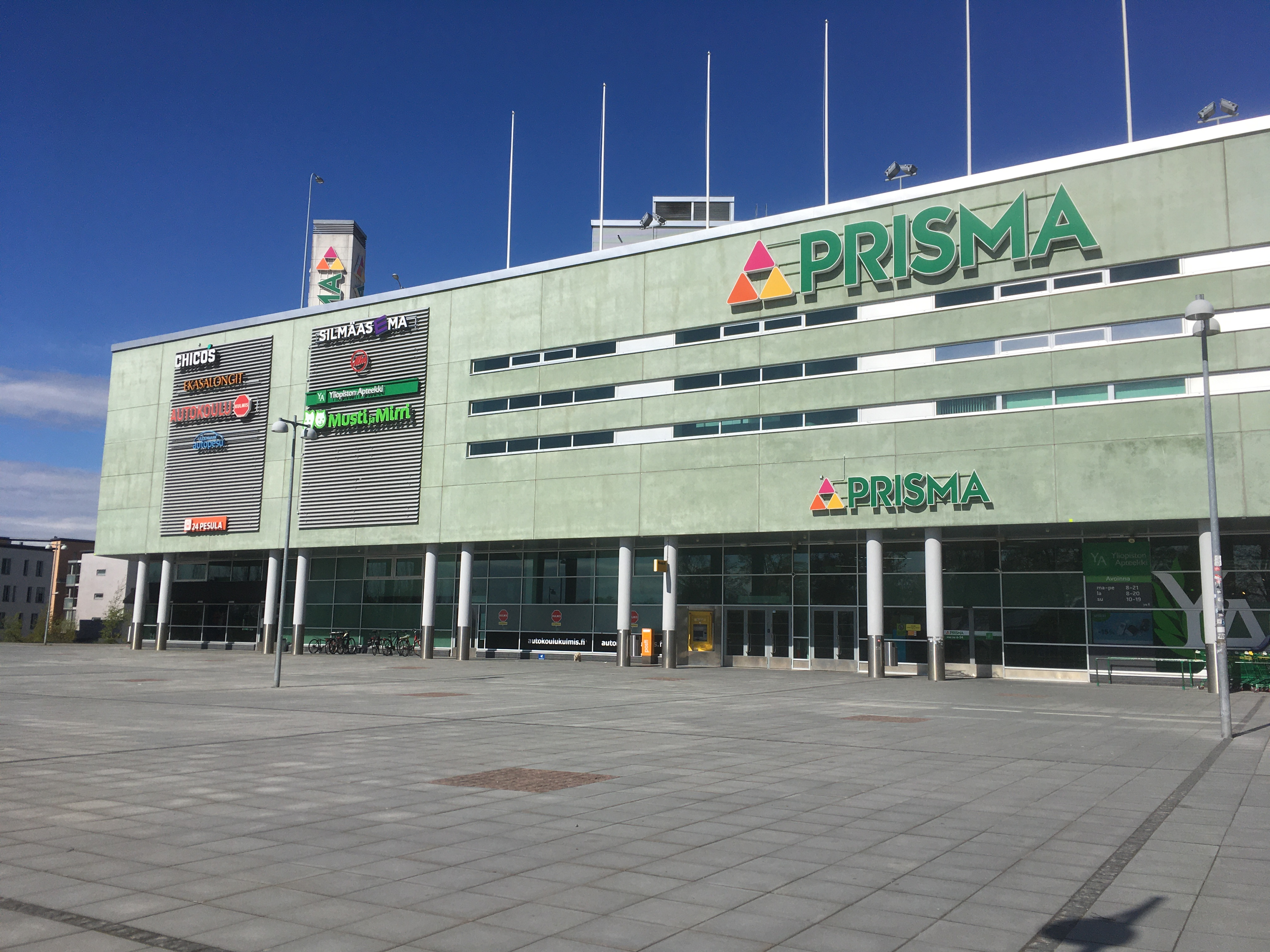
Helsinki: Viikki

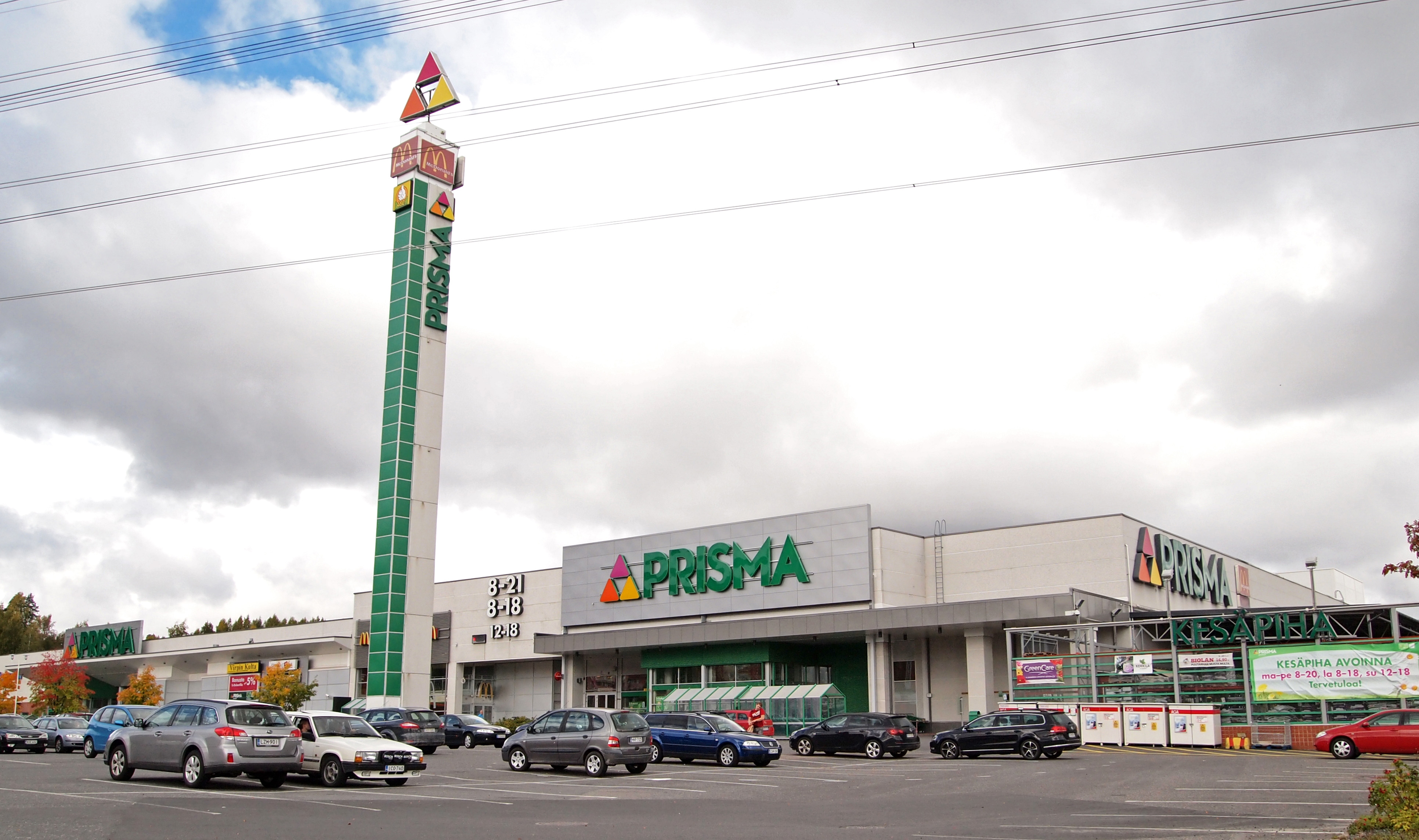
Jyväskylä: Keljo

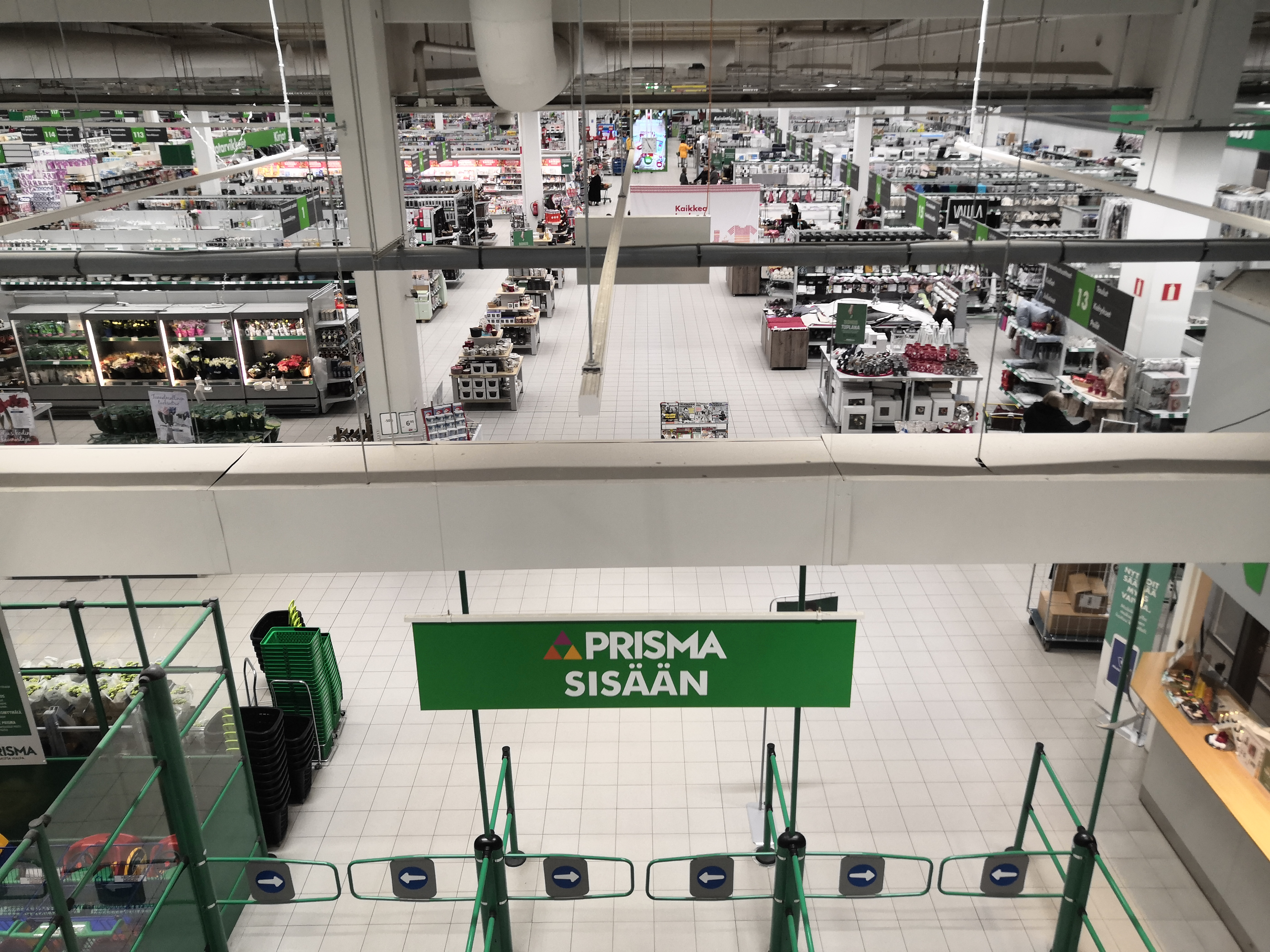
Kouvola: Korjala

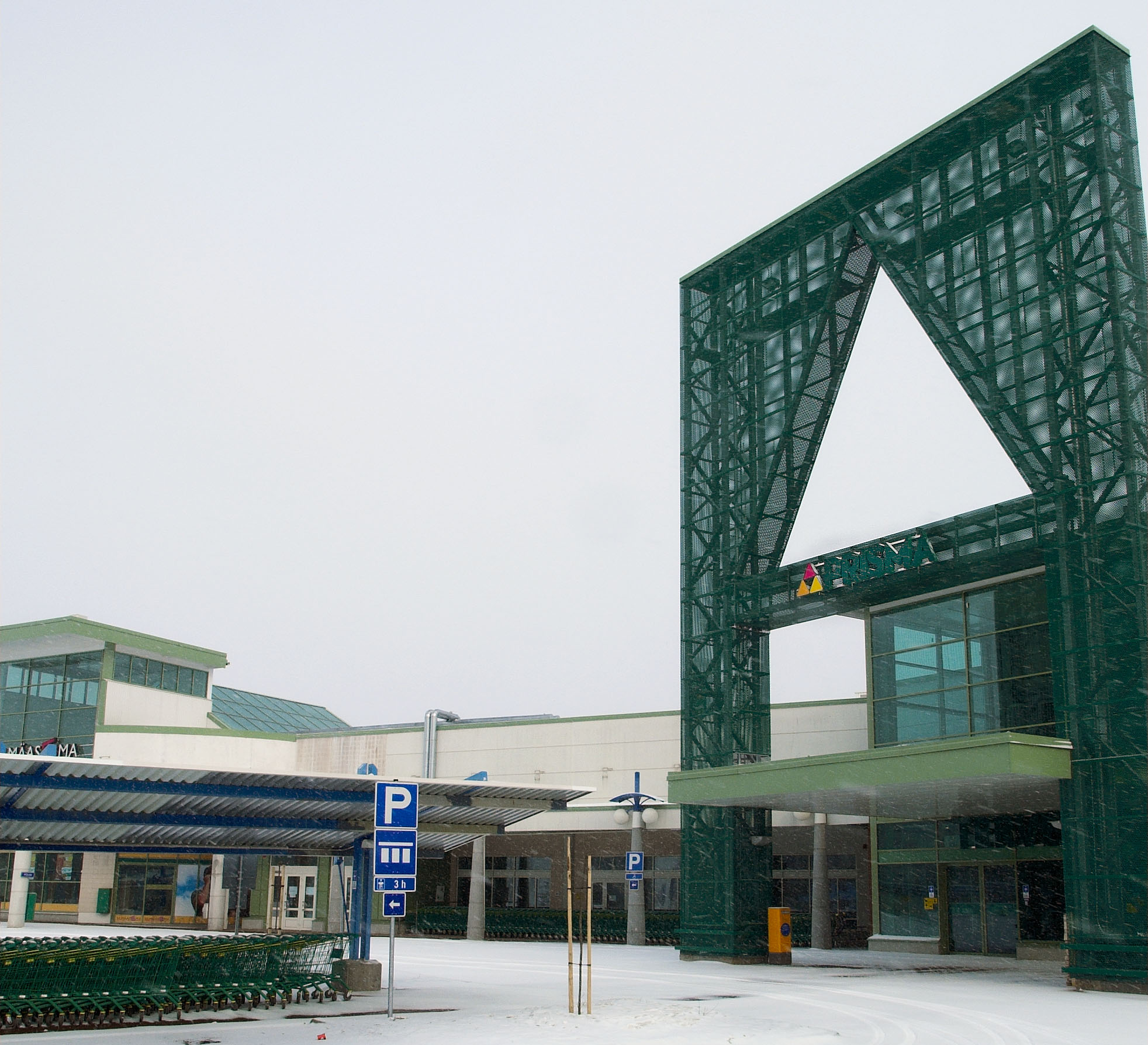
Kuopio: Savilahti

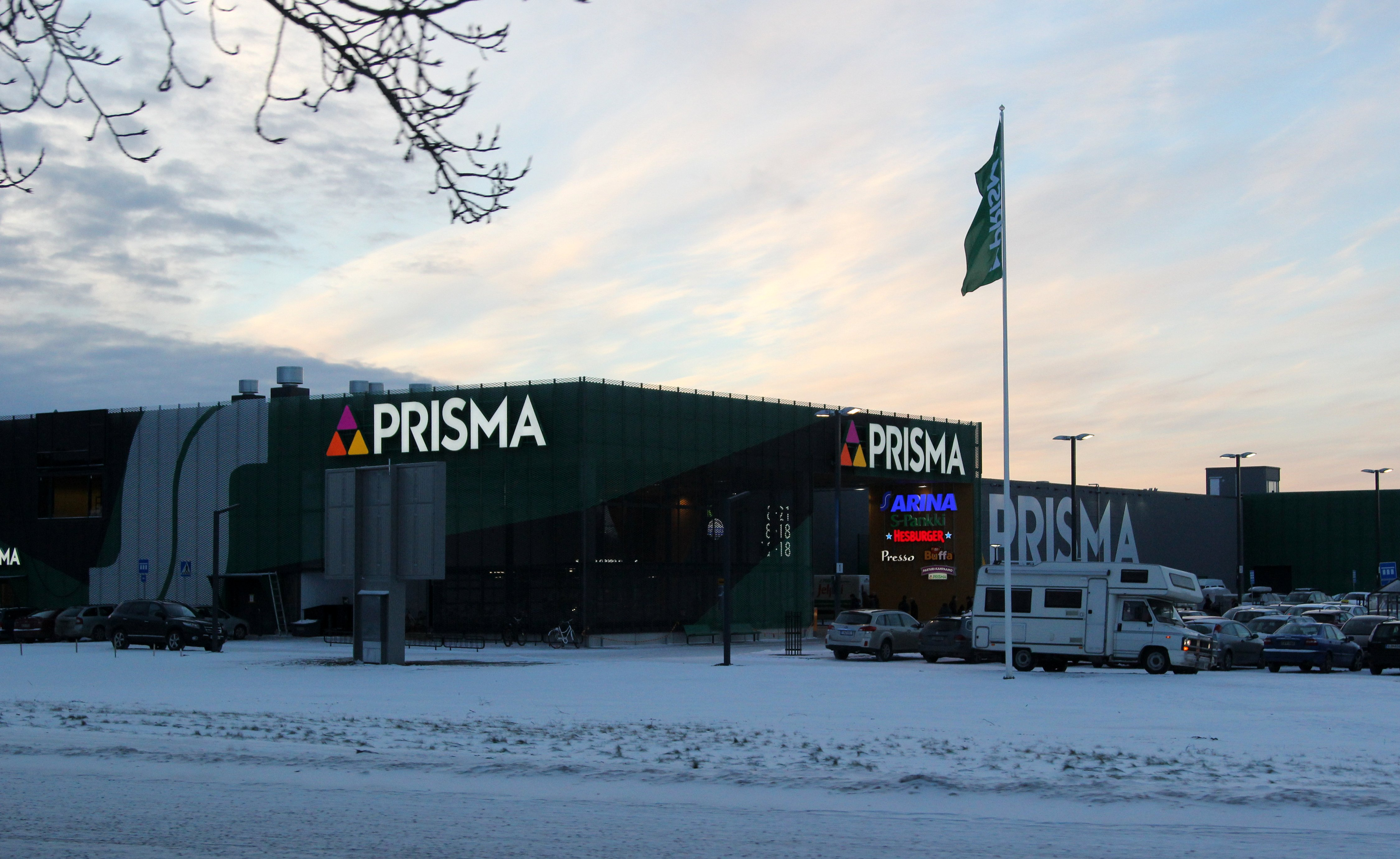
Oulu: Limingantulli

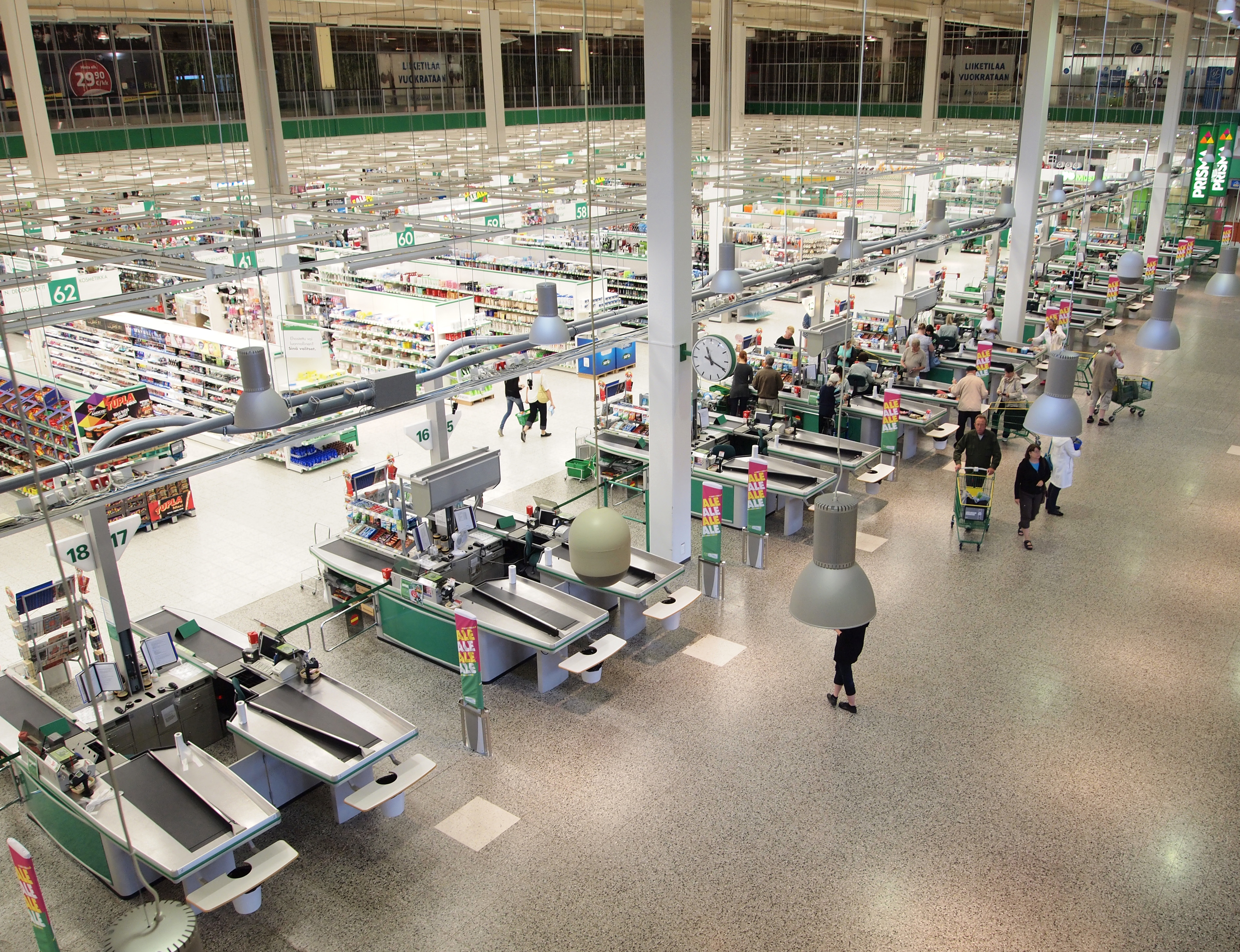
Tampere: Koivistonkylä

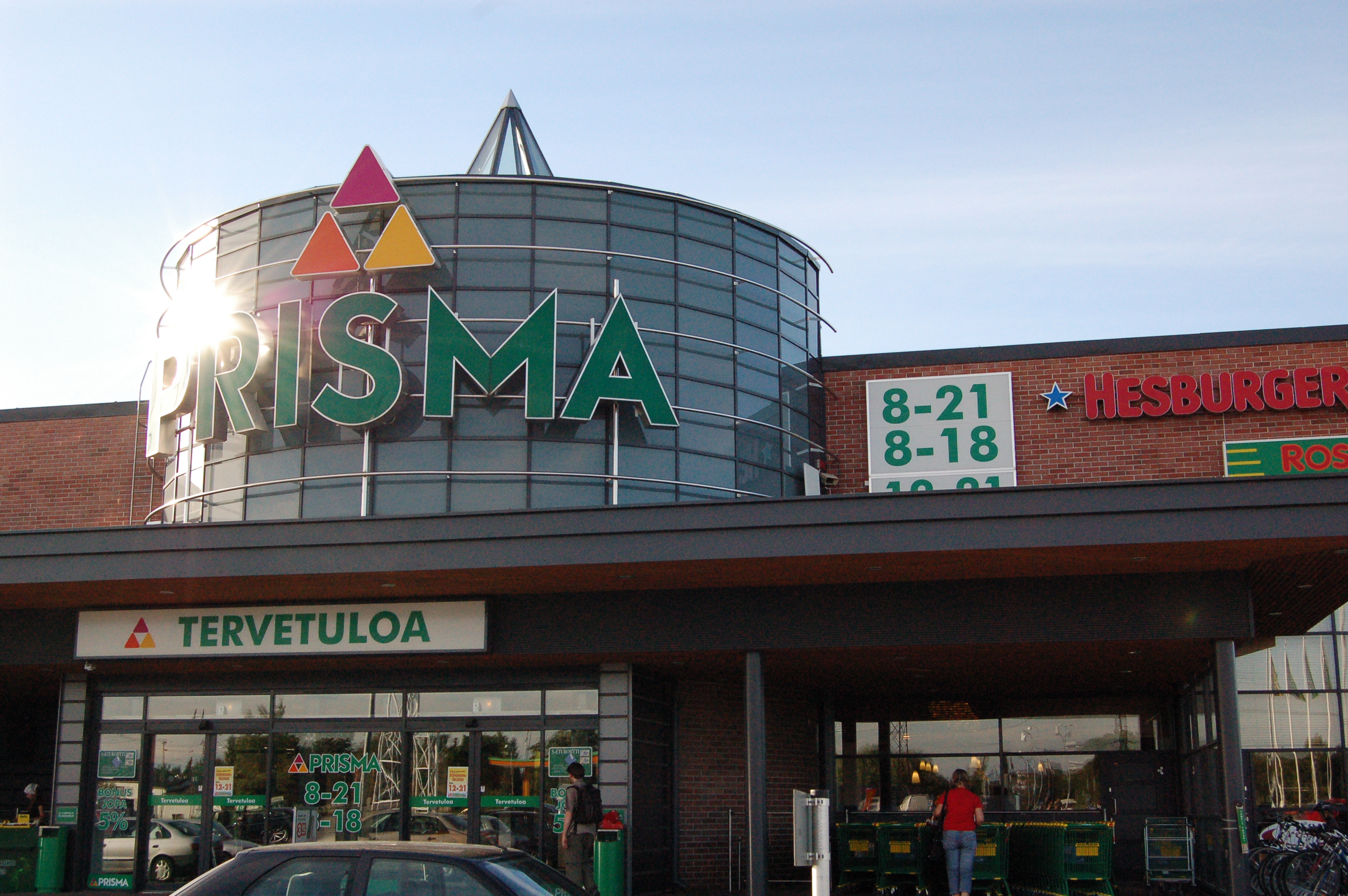
Turku: Tampereentie

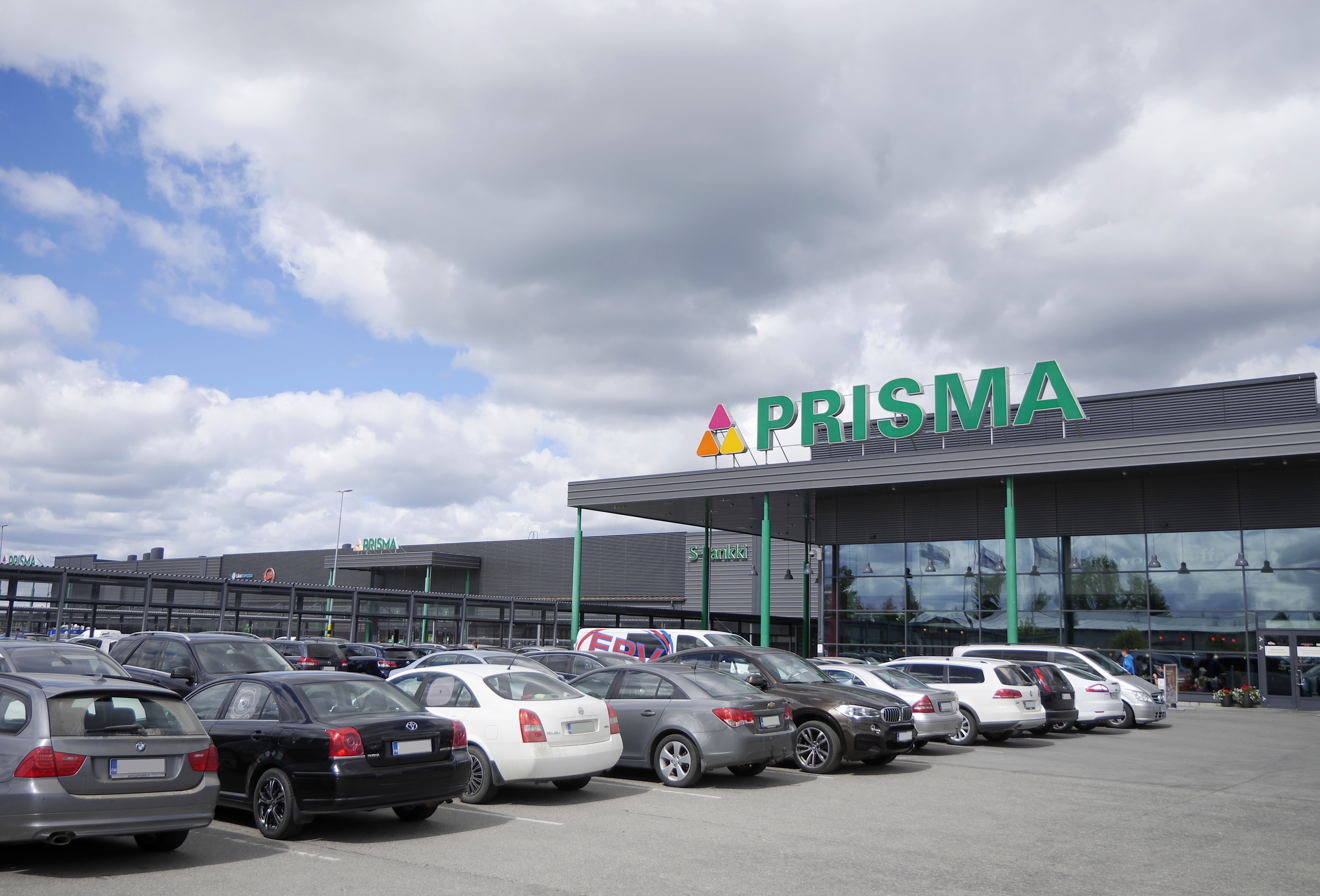
Seinäjoki: Hyllykallio

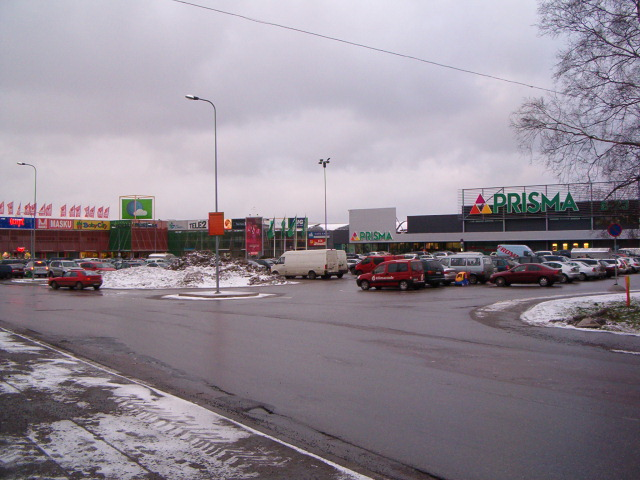
Tallinn: Mustamäe

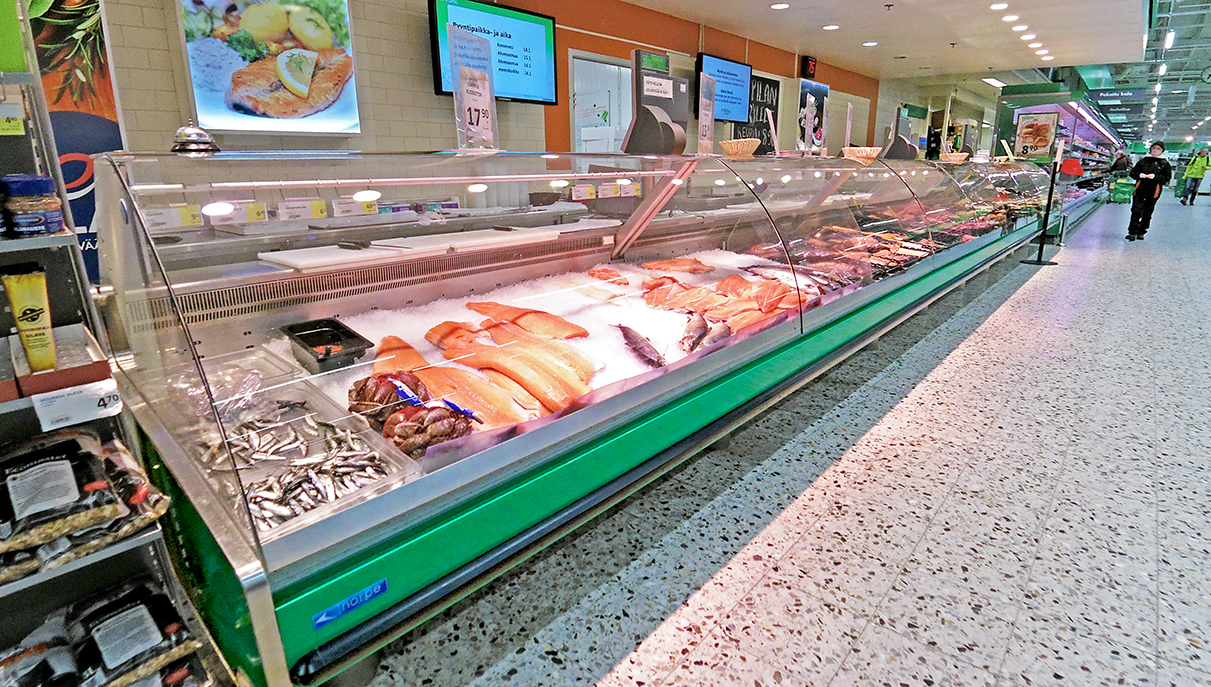
Fish in Prisma

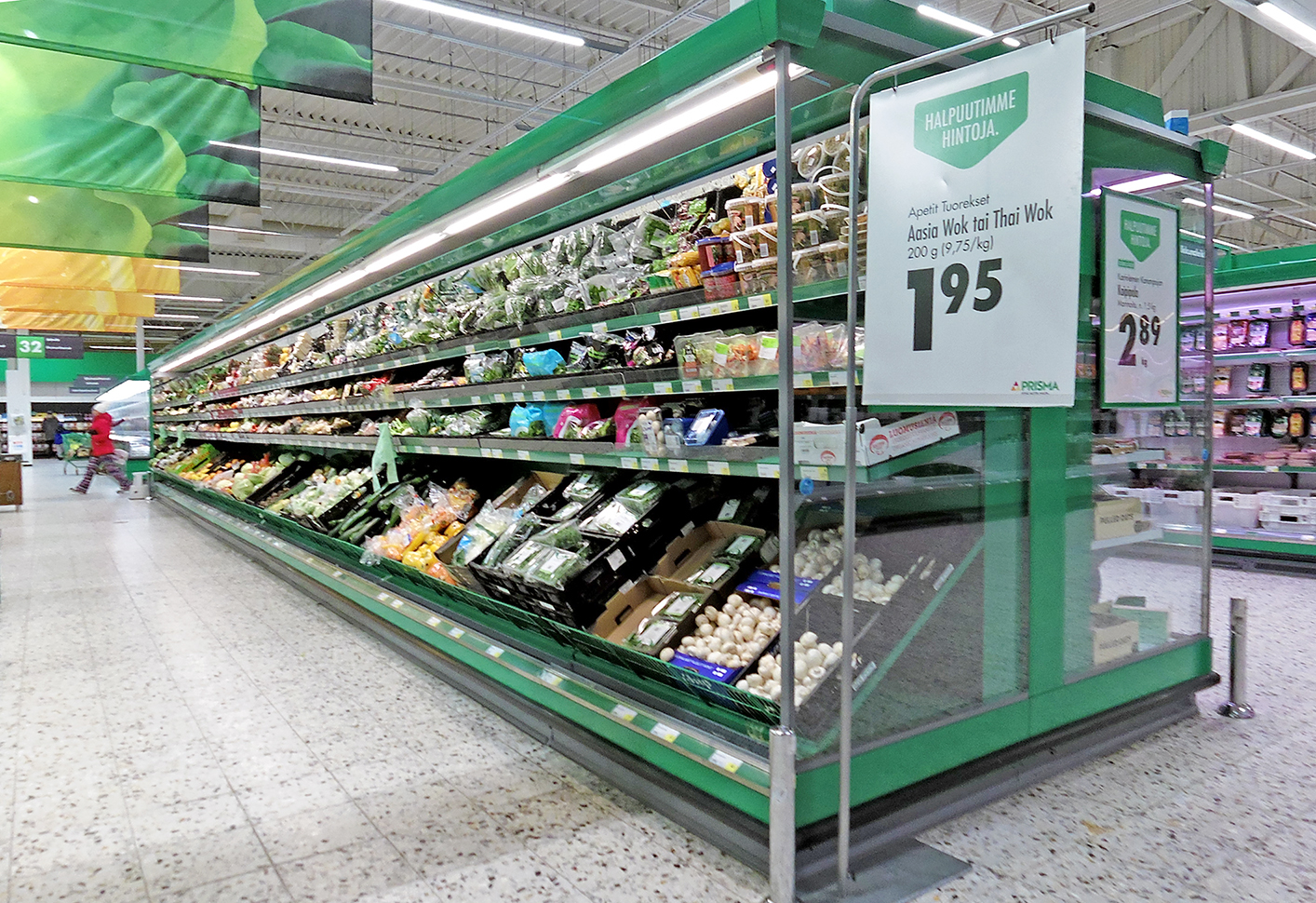
Vegetables in Prisma

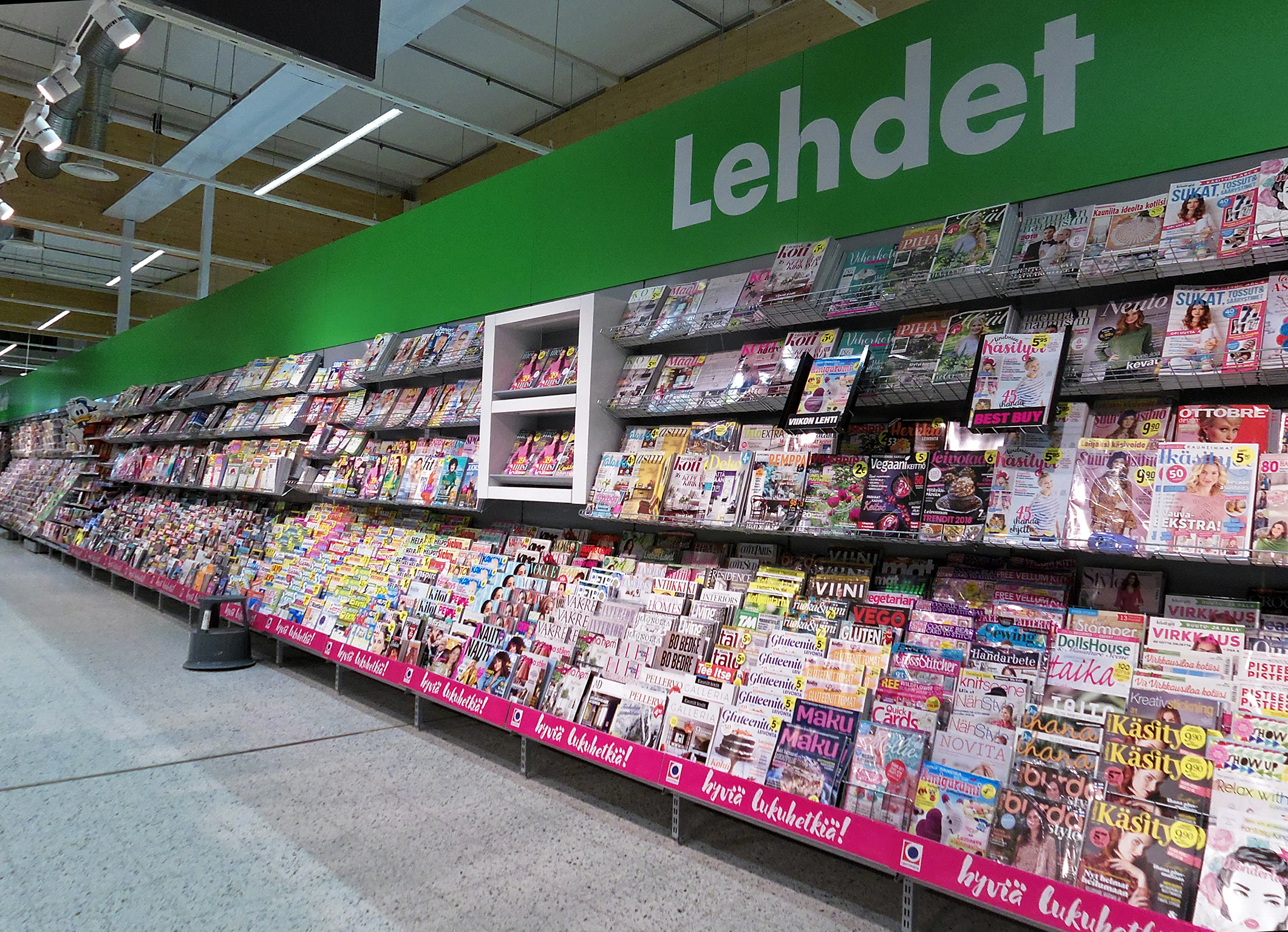
Magazines in Prisma

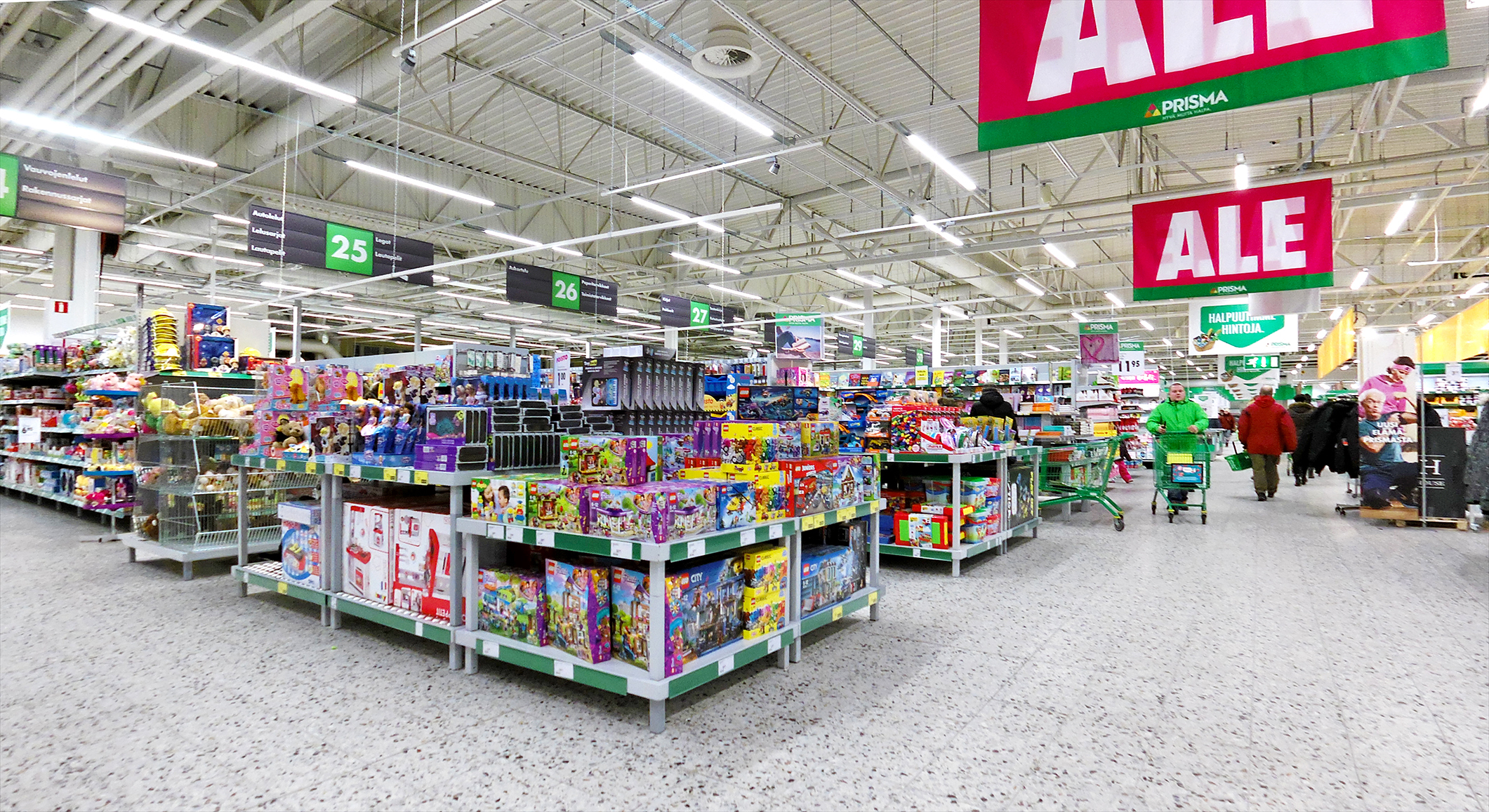
Toys in Prisma

== See also ==
- S Group
- Sello mall shooting
