= Gamamari =

Australian student magazine

- Tharunka, issue 8 2016, front cover
- Type: Student newspaper
- Format: Magazine
- Owner: Arc @ UNSW Limited
- Founded: 1953 (Tharunka) 2024 (Gamamari)
- Language: English
- Headquarters: Sydney, Australia
- Country: Australia
- Website: gamamari.com

Gamamari is a student magazine published at the University of New South Wales in Sydney, Australia. Established in 1953 as Tharunka at the then-New South Wales University of Technology, the magazine has been published in a variety of forms by various student organisations. Until its shutdown in 2023, Gamamari was published three times a year by Arc @ UNSW Limited. In mid-2024 the publication changed its name to Gamamari after concerns about the name Tharunka, which was originally thought to mean "message stick" in a Central Australian Aboriginal language, were raised, with it having been potentially stolen or made up as a name.

== History ==
A 2004 issue, when Tharunka appeared as a weekly tabloid

The first issue of Tharunka was published in March 1953 by the Students' Union, with Sid Dunk and Harold Spies as editors. Until 1980, Tharunka was a weekly newspaper, switching to a fortnightly magazine format from 1981. In 2004 and 2005, Tharunka returned to a tabloid newspaper format. In 2006, Tharunka returned to the fortnightly magazine format. Since 2013, the newspaper has been published in a tabloid newspaper format.

Tharunka was published by the UNSW Students Union from 1953 until 1992, when that body was replaced by the University of New South Wales Student Guild. The Guild published Tharunka from 1993 until 2006. A new student organisation, Arc @ UNSW Limited, took over publication of Tharunka from 2007, with Tharunka now published by a student team under the steerage of its Marketing Department. Tharunka is managed by a small staff and a wider group of volunteers. Including staff wages, the publication's budget is under $40,000 per year.

The magazine temporarily ceased publication at the end of 2023, after its editors expressed concerns that the term "Tharunka", although it did not appear to be an actual Indigenous word, had not been chosen with "appropriate permission or consultation". The magazine was relaunched in mid-2024 called Gamamari, which means “talking for a purpose” in the Dharawal Language.

In early 2024, the independent student publication Noise@UNSW (of no affiliation to the Arts Faculty Society paper in the 1960s) was formed in protest of this shutdown. The editorial team of Noise expressed doubts over the justification of Tharunka's shutdown.

== Content ==
The content of Gamamari varies year to year in line with the priorities of student politicians, the editors and the wider contributor base. Gamamari's at times irreverent approach has seen copies seized by police, destroyed by political opponents and censored by the student organisation.

It is traditional for a parody edition of Gamamari to be released as part of the university's annual Foundation Day celebrations. News satire is a regular feature of the publication.

== Politics ==
As the journal of a political organisation, Gamamari's editorial direction was often influenced by the dominant faction within the student body at the time. Where the editors distanced themselves from the agenda of student representatives, conflict was often the result. A plan by then editor Michael Shane to devote an issue to coverage of issues facing men was met with fierce resistance by the Student Guild's governing council in 2000. Rules were enacted to give the Guild Women's Department a right of veto over content. With the end of the Guild and Union, and founding of Arc, Tharunka is now under the auspices of Arc's Marketing Department, rather than a political organisation. However, editorial remains edgy with Issue 1 of 2010 containing the word 'fuck' on its front cover.

In November 2004, the Guild was attacked by Daily Telegraph columnist Michael Duffy for attempting to prevent the expression of support for voluntary student unionism at UNSW. "Student politics is still notoriously corrupt and secretive", Duffy wrote, reporting that "the editors of the student union magazine Tharunka, have been told by the Guild Council ... not to publish articles in support of voluntary unionism."

In October 2010, the Arc withheld the final edition of Tharunka for the year even though 2000 copies had already been printed. The edition had originally included an article on the subject of BDSM sexual practices, which the CEO of Arc refused to publish. The editors complied by withdrawing the offending article, but printed in its place a mocking note making fun of censorship. As a result, the magazine was refused distribution.

== Notable editors and contributors ==
- Social commentator and writer Richard Neville was features editor of Tharunka in the early 1960s.
- Artists Peter Kingston and Martin Sharp had cartoons published in Tharunka before going on to contribute to Oz magazine.
- Academic and investigative journalist Wendy Bacon was elected as an editor of Tharunka in 1970.
- Artist, illustrator and political cartoonist Jenny Coopes contributed cartoons to Tharunka in the 1960s.
- Writer Frank Moorhouse edited a Tharunka literary supplement in 1970. Contributors included Thomas Keneally, Judith Wright, A. D. Hope, Robert Adamson, Frank Hardy, Michael Wilding, Alex Buzo and Thomas Shapcott.

== Other student media at UNSW ==
Tharunka is one of a number of periodicals that have emerged from the university.

- Blitz is a fortnightly, 24-page full-colour campus events guide that evolved from newsletters circulated by the University of New South Wales Union in the 1970s. The name "Blitz" was adopted in mid-1988. In mid-1994, the Union introduced more editorial material to Blitz, hiring former Tharunka editor Alf Conlon to expand the range of content. In 2010, Blitz remains a "What's On" guide with content steered towards providing coverage to on-campus news and events, and also as a conduit of communication for the Student Representative Council. Blitz and Tharunka are now both published by Arc.
- Students at the university's College of Fine Arts produced regular zines under the titles Xerox Positive, and since 2005, Zing Tycoon with 'COFAtopia' now launched, which retains the A5 format, "zine" feel.
- Tharunka contributors were instrumental in the establishment of The Student Leader in 2004.
- Tharunka contributors were instrumental in the establishment of Noise@UNSW in 2024.

== Digitisation ==
The paper has been partially digitised as part of the Australian Newspapers Digitisation Program project of the National Library of Australia.

All issues of Tharunka from 1953 to 2023 have been digitised by the UNSW Library and are publicly available through the UNSW Archives digital collections website.
