= Köpping =

Köpping is a surname. Notable people with the surname include:

- Johann Christian Köpping (1704–1772), German curator
- Petra Köpping (born 1958), German politician

== See also ==
- Kopp (surname)
- Koppigen
