= COOP exam =

US Catholic high school admissions test

The Cooperative Admissions Examination Program, or COOP exam, is a standardized admissions test used by many Catholic High schools in the Northern New Jersey and Hudson Valley region.

The exam is given once a year in the beginning of November on the Friday of New Jersey teacher convention break, to eighth grade students who wish to attend Catholic high schools in the dioceses of Newark and Paterson It consists of 7 separate tests designed to test students ability in Math, English, reasoning, critical thinking, etc. The test results are used by schools to compare and make decisions on applicants. Some schools may also use the exam award scholarships to high scoring students.

== Administration ==
The exam is offered once a year, usually on a Friday in early November, with the results being released during mid-January. There is usually a make-up exam given a week after the regular test.

== Fee ==
The exam costs $60 per student; an additional fee of $15 is added if the student takes the make up test.

== Format ==
The exam is divided into seven separate Tests, each with a time limit ranging from 15 minutes to an hour. The tests deal with analogies, math, reading comprehension, verbal and quantitative reasoning, and critical thinking.

The test is entirely multiple choice and calculators are not permitted.
