= Ursula Coope =

British classical scholar

Ursula Charlotte Macgillivray Coope FBA (born 31 July 1969) is a British classical scholar, who is an expert in the study of the ancient Greek philosopher Aristotle's physics, metaphysics, and ethics, as well as on Neoplatonism. She is Professor of Ancient Philosophy at the University of Oxford.

== Early life and education ==
Coope was born on 31 July 1969 in Leeds, Yorkshire, England. She was educated at Harrogate Grammar School. She studied Philosophy, Politics & Economics at the University of Oxford (BA degree awarded 1992) and then did a PhD in Philosophy at the University of California at Berkeley (1999).

== Career ==
Since 2017, Coope has been the Professor of Ancient Philosophy in the Faculty of Philosophy, University of Oxford, and a professorial fellow of Keble College, Oxford. Previously, she was a tutorial fellow and professor of ancient philosophy at Corpus Christi College, Oxford, and global distinguished professor at New York University; she has also held positions at University College London, Birkbeck College London, and Princeton. She is joint editor of the ancient philosophy journal Phronesis.

Coope's first book, Time for Aristotle: Physics IV. 10-14 (2005), which analyses Aristotle's conception of time and the importance of this for understanding the Physics as a whole, has been described as "a beautifully concise and clear study of an exceedingly difficult section of the Physics" and an "important, insightful, forcefully characterized interpretation of Aristotle's discussion of time". Her second book, Freedom and Responsibility in Neoplatonist Thought (2020), discusses Neoplatonist philosophers' views of freedom, responsibility, and the relationship between them.

Coope was elected as a Fellow of the British Academy in 2020.

== Publications ==
=== Books ===
- Freedom and Responsibility in Neoplatonist Thought, Oxford University Press 2020. ISBN 9780198824831.
- Time for Aristotle: Physics IV. 10-14, Oxford University Press 2005. ISBN 0-19-924790-0.

=== Book chapters and journal articles ===
- 'Rational assent and self-reversion: a Neoplatonist Response to the Stoics, Oxford Studies in Ancient Philosophy (2016).
- 'Self-motion as other-motion in Aristotle's Physics' in Aristotle's Physics: a critical guide ed M. Leunissen, Cambridge University Press (2015).
- 'Aquinas on judgment and the active power of reason' Philosophers Imprint (2013).
- 'Why does Aristotle think that Ethical Virtue is Required for Practical Wisdom?' Phronesis, 57, (2012).
- 'Aristotle's Physics VII.3. 246a10-246b3' in Reading Aristotle Physics VII.3: 'What is alteration?' Proceedings of the European Society for Ancient Philosophy, ed. S. Maso and C. Natali (2012).
- 'Aristotle on the infinite' in Oxford Handbook of Aristotle, ed. C Shields (2012).
- 'Aristotle on voluntariness and choice' in Blackwell Companion to Action, ed. C Sandis (2010).
- 'Change and its relation to actuality and potentiality' in Blackwell Companion to Aristotle, ed. G. Anagnostopoulos (2009).
- 'Aristotle: time and change' in Routledge Companion to Metaphysics ed. R. Le Poidevin, P Simons, A McGonigal, R Cameron (2009).
- 'Aristotle on action', Proceedings of the Aristotelian Society, Supplementary Volume CVI (2007).
- 'Aristotle's account of agency in Physics III.3' Proceedings of the Boston Area Colloquium in Ancient Philosophy, (2004).
- 'Why does Aristotle say that there is no time without change?' Proceedings of the Aristotelian Society (2001).
