= Koop Dairy =

Cyprus dairy

Koop Dairy Dairy and Oil Products Production and Marketing Cooperative Ltd
- Company type: Public
- Founded: 1958
- Headquarters: 35.195858°N 33.345334°E, Ortakoy, Nicosia, Cyprus
- Key people: Salih Uluşan (President)
- Products: Dairy Products, Fruit juice, Sunflower oil
- Number of employees: 162 (2010)
- Website: http://www.koopsut.com

Koop Dairy (Turkish: Koop Süt) is a Turkish Cypriot dairy products company located in Nicosia, Cyprus.

== History ==
KOOP, was founded by 21 farmers in a village near Nicosia in 1958 under the name of Dairy Products Company. Company moved to its current headquarters in Ortakoy in 1962.

The company was purchased by the Cooperative Central Bank (Koop Bank) in 1968. After the purchase name of the company changed to its current name, Koop Süt.

== Products ==
During the first few years of production, the company was producing using only sheep milk. Company's main operational fields are dairy products and fruit juices. Currently the company produces the following products:

- Pasteurized milk
- Halloumi
- Cheese
- Sunflower oil
- Corn oil
- Ice cream
- Olive oil
- Legumes
