= Tallinna Kaubamaja Group =

Company based in Tallinn, Estonia

Tallinna Kaubamaja Group (Estonian: Tallinna Kaubamaja Grupp) is an Estonian trade concern located in Tallinn. The Group's operators deals with both: retail and wholesale trade. Over one tenth of Estonian retail is contributed by the Group.

The Group history began in 1960 when Tallinn Department Store was opened.

As of 2019, the Group annual profit was 29.8 million euros and therefore the Group belongs to TOP 10 companies in Estonia. By revenue of 651.3 million euros, the Group is 4th in Estonia.

The Group is owner of well-known brands like Kaubamaja, Selver, Selveri Köök, Tartu Kaubamaja Centre, Viking Motors, KIA, ABC King, SHU, I.L.U., Viking Security.

The Group employs about 3500 people.

The company's market value increased by 2.9% on the stock exchange in 2020. A total of 52,456 transactions were made with the stock in 2020, during which 4.7 million Tallinna Kaubamaja shares changed hands. The total turnover of the transactions was 38.7 million euros. The share of Tallinna Kaubamaja is one of the most actively traded shares on the Nasdaq Baltic stock exchange. In 2020, only Tallink and Šiauliai Bank shares were traded on the Nasdaq Baltic stock exchange (based on turnover).

As of September 28, 2021, the market value of Tallinna Kaubamaja is 443.9 million euros, making it the seventh largest company on the Nasdaq Baltic Stock Exchange. Tallink and Šiauliai Bank are comparable in size.
