= Volker Koop =

German author and journalist

Volker Koop (1945–2022) was a German non-fiction author, opinion writer, and freelance journalist.

He was also a spokesman for the German Ministry of Defense.

== Books ==
- Ausgegrenzt. Der Fall der DDR-Grenztruppen. Brandenburgisches Verlagshaus, Berlin 1993, ISBN 3-89488-064-3.
- (with Dietmar Schössler) Erbe NVA. Eindrücke aus ihrer Geschichte und den Tagen der Wende. Akademie der Bundeswehr für Information und Kommunikation, Waldbröl 1993.
- Abgewickelt? Auf den Spuren der Nationalen Volksarmee. Bouvier Verlag, Bonn 1995, ISBN 3-416-02567-9.
- Der Spree-Bogen. Carl Bolle und sein Vermächtnis. Brandenburgisches Verlagshaus, Berlin 1995, ISBN 3-89488-088-0; aktualisierte und erweiterte Neuauflage: be.bra, Berlin 2011, ISBN 978-3-8148-0184-1.
- Den Gegner vernichten: Die Grenzsicherung der DDR. Bouvier, Bonn 1996, ISBN 3-416-02633-0.
- Zwischen Recht und Willkür. Die Rote Armee in Deutschland. Bouvier, Bonn 1996, ISBN 3-416-02626-8.
- Zehn Jahre mit dem "gelben Streifen". Karl-Heinz Rutsch: Vom Offizier der NVA zum Deserteur. edition q, Berlin 1996, ISBN 3-86124-318-0.
- Deckname Vergeltung. Die Stasi und der Tod der Brüder Baer. Bouvier, Bonn 1997, ISBN 3-416-02708-6.
- Armee oder Freizeitclub? Die Kampfgruppen der Arbeiterklasse der DDR. Bouvier, Bonn 1997, ISBN 3-416-02670-5
- Tagebuch der Berliner Blockade. Von Schwarzmarkt und Rollkommandos, Bergbau und Bienenzucht. Bouvier, Bonn 1998, ISBN 3-416-02808-2.
- Kein Kampf um Berlin? Deutsche Politik zur Zeit der Berlin-Blockade 1948/1949. Bouvier, Bonn 1998, ISBN 3-416-02754-X.
- Der 17. Juni 1953. Legende und Wirklichkeit. Siedler Verlag, Berlin 2003, ISBN 3-88680-748-7.
- Der Aufstand vom 17. Juni 1953. Landeszentrale für politische Bildung, Berlin 2003.
- Das Recht der Sieger. Absurde alliierte Befehle im Nachkriegsdeutschland. be.bra, Berlin 2004, ISBN 3-89809-049-3.
- Ich habe keine Hoffnung mehr. Soldatenbriefe aus Russland 1942–1943. edition q, Berlin 2004, ISBN 3-86124-580-9.
- Besetzt. Französische Besatzungspolitik in Deutschland. be.bra, Berlin 2005, ISBN 3-89809-064-7.
- Das schmutzige Vermögen. Das Dritte Reich, die IG Farben und die Schweiz. Siedler, München 2005, ISBN 3-88680-811-4 (auch in japanischer Lizenzausgabe erschienen).
- Besetzt. Amerikanische Besatzungspolitik in Deutschland. be.bra, Berlin 2006, ISBN 3-89809-069-8.
- Dem Führer ein Kind schenken. Die SS-Organisation Lebensborn. Böhlau, Köln/Weimar/Wien 2007, ISBN 978-3-412-21606-1.
- Besetzt. Britische Besatzungspolitik in Deutschland. be.bra, Berlin 2007, ISBN 978-3-89809-076-6.
- Himmlers letztes Aufgebot. Die NS-Organisation Werwolf. Böhlau, Köln/Weimar/Wien 2008, ISBN 978-3-412-20191-3.
- Besetzt. Sowjetische Besatzungspolitik in Deutschland. be.bra, Berlin 2008, ISBN 978-3-89809-082-7 (auch als Sonderausgabe der Landeszentralen für politische Bildung Sachsen, Berlin).
- Wissen was stimmt. Nationalsozialismus. Herder, Freiburg/Basel/Wien 2009, ISBN 978-3-451-06132-5 (auch in tschechischer Lizenzausgabe erschienen).
- Hitlers Fünfte Kolonne. Die Auslandsorganisation der NSDAP. be.bra, Berlin 2009, ISBN 978-3-89809-085-8.
- In Hitlers Hand. Sonder- und Ehrenhäftlinge der SS. Böhlau, Köln/Weimar/Wien 2010, ISBN 978-3-412-20580-5.
- Himmlers Germanenwahn. Die SS-Organisation Ahnenerbe und ihre Verbrechen. be.bra, Berlin 2012, ISBN 978-3-89809-097-1.
- Martin Bormann. Hitlers Vollstrecker. Böhlau, Köln/Weimar/Wien 2012, ISBN 978-3-412-20942-1.
  In English: Martin Bormann: Hitler's Executioner, 2020
- Hitlers Muslime. Die Geschichte einer unheiligen Allianz. be.bra, Berlin 2012, ISBN 978-3-89809-096-4.
- Gedichte für Hitler. Zeugnisse von Wahn und Verblendung im "Dritten Reich". be.bra, Berlin 2013, ISBN 978-3-89809-104-6.
- Wer Jude ist, bestimme ich. "Ehrenarier" im Nationalsozialismus. Böhlau, Köln/Weimar/Wien 2014, ISBN 978-3-412-22216-1.
- Rudolf Höß. Der Kommandant von Auschwitz. Böhlau, Köln/Weimar/Wien 2014, ISBN 978-3-412-22353-3.
  In English: The Commandant of Auschwitz: Rudolf Höss, 2021
- Warum Hitler King Kong liebte, aber den Deutschen Micky Maus verbot. Die geheimen Lieblingsfilme der Nazi-Elite. be.bra verlag, Berlin 2015, ISBN 978-3-89809-125-1.
- Hitlers Griff nach Afrika. Kolonialpolitik im Dritten Reich, Dietz-Verlag, 2018
