= Sheldon B. Kopp =

American psychotherapist and author (1929–1999)

Sheldon Kopp
- Born: Sheldon Bernard Kopp; March 29, 1929; New York City, US
- Died: March 29, 1999 (aged 70); Washington, DC, US
- Education: Brooklyn College; The New School (PhD)
- Spouse: Marjorie Ice Kopp (m. 1953)
- Children: 3
- Scientific career
- Fields: Psychotherapy
- Thesis: Deductive reasoning in paranoid schizophrenics (1960)

Sheldon Bernard Kopp (29 March 1929 – 29 March 1999) was a psychotherapist and author. Born in New York City, he worked in Washington, D.C. for 35 years and lived in Silver Spring, Maryland.

== Education ==
Kopp graduated from Brooklyn College in 1951 and received a PhD degree in 1960 for research on deductive reasoning in patients with schizophrenia completed at The New School.

== Career ==
In addition to his private practice, he served as a psychotherapy supervisor for the pastoral counselling and consultation centres in Washington D.C.

=== Published books ===
Kopp was a prolific author, and wrote 17 books, mostly on self-esteem including:

- Guru: Metaphors from a Psychotherapist
- If you meet the Buddha on the road, kill him!
- The Hanged Man
- No Hidden Meanings
- Naked Therapist
- Back to One: A Practical Guide for Psychotherapists
- This Side of Tragedy: Psychotherapy as Theater
- An End to Innocence: Facing Life without Illusions
- What Took You so Long: An Assortment of Life's Everyday Ironies
- Mirror, Mask, and Shadow: The Risk and Rewards of Self-acceptance
- The Pickpocket and the Saint: Free Play of the Imagination
- Even a stone can be a teacher
- Here I am, Wasn't I! The Inevitable Disruption of Easy Times
- Who Am I Really?
- Raise Your Right Hand against Fear: Extend the Other in Compassion
- Rock, Paper, Scissors: Understanding the Paradoxes of Personal Power and Taking Charge of Our Lives
- All God's Children Are Lost, but Only a Few Can Play the Piano: Finding a Life That Is Truly Your Own
- Blues ain't nothing but a good soul feeling bad

== Personal life ==
Kopp died of cardiac arrhythmia and pneumonia.
