= Jenny Coopes =

Australian cartoonist

Jenny Coopes (born 1945, New South Wales, Australia), also known as Jennifer Coopes, is an Australian political cartoonist, illustrator and painter. She contributes as a cartoonist for Australian law journal the Justinian.

== Education and career ==
Coopes was trained at the Brisbane Technical Art College. Later she would attend University of New South Wales and work as a cartoonist for the student newspaper Tharunka .While she claims that she stumbled on to creating political cartoons, she was able to make a career off of the drawings, which is a great testament to skill given that in the 1970s she was the female cartoonist working in Australian newspapers. She contributed to many newspapers in the 1970s her time was mainly vested in the National Times from 1977 to the 1980s. In 1984 she would contribute her work to Fairfax newspapers in Sydney such as: Sydney Morning Herald and the Australian Financial Review

== Awards and accolades ==
In 1985, Coopes would be the first woman to win a Walkley Award, for Best Illustration for her cartoon in the National Times entitled "His Honour, The Prisoner". In 1999 she would win additional Walkley Award for Best Illustration in 1989. Coopes third win, this time for best cartoon was also notable in that the same year Fiona Lawrence won for Best Illustration, making it the first time that two women won in visual categories.
