= Russell Coope =

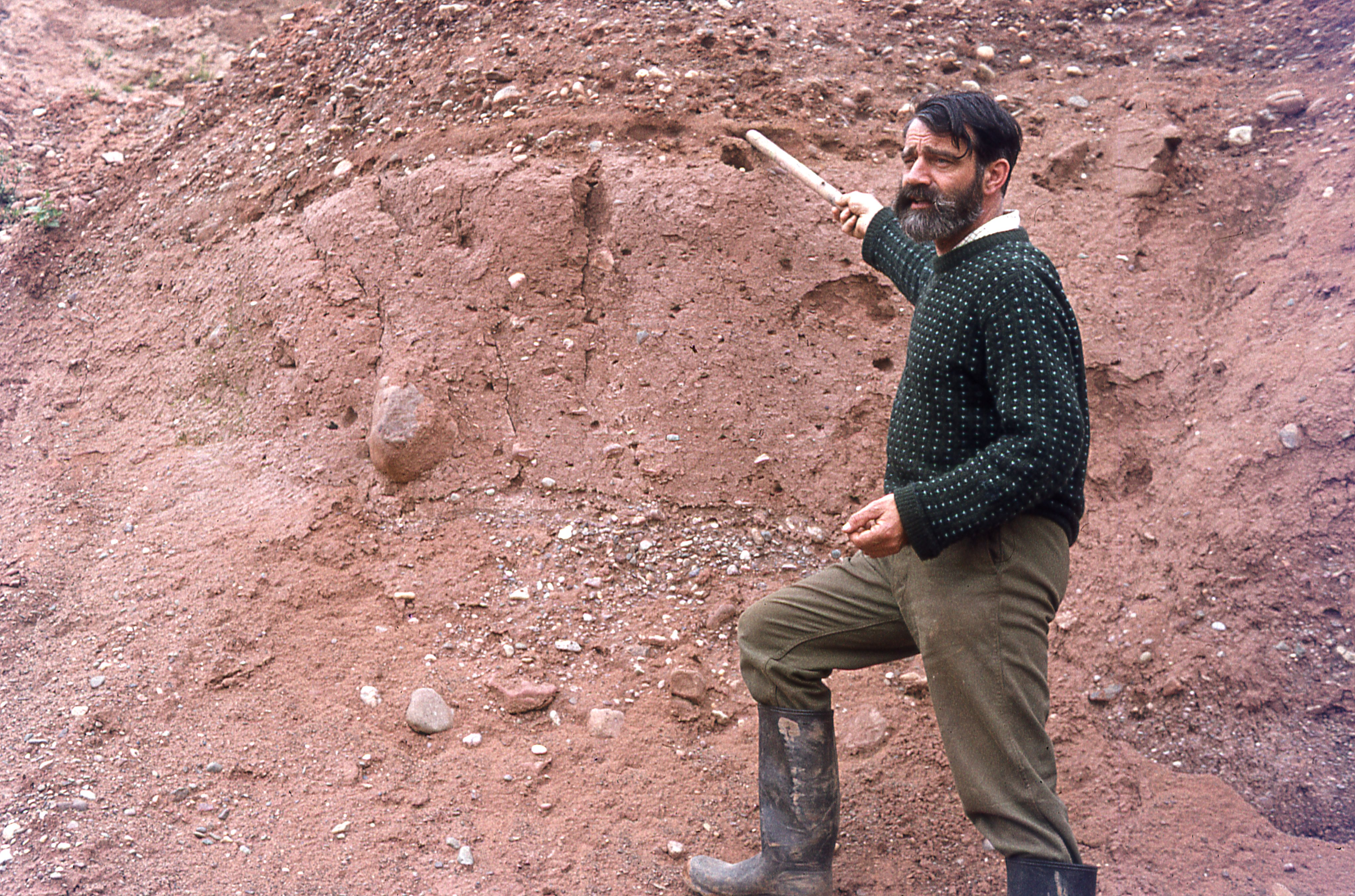
Russell Coope

Russell Coope, also Geoffrey Russell Coope and G. Russell Coope (1930 Cheshire, UK – 2011) was a Quaternary paleoentomologist and neontologist and a paleoclimatologist specializing in the British Pleistocene. He was an expert and leader in the reconstruction of Quaternary paleoenvironmental conditions from fossil beetles. The relatively young age of his fossils allowed Coope to explore construction sites for fossils, in addition to geological field sites.

Coope was an Honorary Professor of Quaternary Science and staff member at the University of Birmingham from 1955 to 1993. After retiring he continued working in his home laboratory and at Royal Holloway, University of London. Coope turned to beetles as a researcher subject while searching for fossil corals in Pleistocene sediments revealed in a sand quarry being worked in the Chelford Sands. Many of the beetles he found were from sites around Upton Warren in Worcestershire, and he used these to show that past climate change had been rapid, data that were later confirmed by Greenland ice cores. Quaternary International in 2014 published an issue composed mostly of papers given in his honour in June 2012 at Royal Holloway.
