= Selver =

Company based in Estonia

- Type: Supermarket
- Founded: 1995
- Number of locations: 72
- Area served: Estonia
- Owner: Tallinna Kaubamaja Grupp
- Website: www.selver.ee

Selver is a chain of supermarkets and hypermarkets operating in Estonia. Selver is a subsidiary of Tallinna Kaubamaja Grupp. The chain was established in 1995 with the opening of Punane Selver in Lasnamäe, Tallinn. Expansion outside of Tallinn began on 10 May 2002 with the opening of Mai Selver in Pärnu. Since 18 December 2008 Selver also operated in Latvia, but at the end of 2009 due to a financial crisis. Selver was forced to close all its 6 supermarkets in Latvia. There are currently 73 stores in operation all over Estonia (as of August 2022).

In 2012 – Kulinaaria OÜ – a subsidiary of AS Selver was created. Kulinaaria, which has grown into the most modern food producer in the Baltics, currently supplies Selveri Köök's food to Selver stores across Estonia. Other clients include the convenience stores of Olerex and Alexela, as well as Tallink ships. In addition to the Selveri Köök brand, the Van Kook and Gurmee Catering brands have also been established.

In 2021, the home delivery area of the Selver e-store expanded to all of Estonia. With the expansion, e-Selver became the only e-grocery store that delivers goods home by courier to every county in mainland Estonia and the large islands throughout their entire extent.

== Annual sales ==
Selver gross sales (in million Euros):

- 2010 – 300,2
- 2005 (nine months) – 94,6
- 2004 – 93,8
- 2003 – 78,2

== Stores ==
=== Hypermarkets ===
Location	Address	Size (m^{2})	Opened
Kadaka Selver	Kadaka tee 56a, Tallinn	4600	8 October 1998
Pirita Selver	Rummu tee 4, Tallinn	4000	23 May 2000
Järve Selver	Pärnu maantee 238, Tallinn	7000	27 September 2000
Tondi Selver	Tammsaare tee 62, Tallinn	2800	17 May 2001
Torupilli Selver	Vesivärava 37, Tallinn	2800	12 December 2002
Peetri Selver	Veesaare tee 2, Rae Vald	3000	14 November 2013
Viimsi Selver	Sõpruse tee 15, Viimsi Vald	2500	13 August 2015
T1 Selver	Peterburi tee 2H, Tallinn	3500	8 November 2018

=== Supermarkets ===
Location	Address	Size (m^{2})	Opened	Additional info
Punane Selver	Punane 46	1000	19 December 1995	Closed on 28 May 2023, due to client unsatisfaction. Later the building was bought by Latvian company.
Mai Selver	Papiniidu 42	1500	10 May 2002	
Merimetsa Selver	Paldiski maantee 56	2300	30 May 2002	
Krooni Selver	F.G. Adoffi 11	2300	5 October 2002	
Männimäe Selver	Riia maantee 35	1200	17 October 2002	
Saare Selver	Tallinna 67	2000	10 June 2004	
Anne Selver	Kalda tee 43	3200	26 May 2005	
Ringtee Selver	Aardla 114	2300	2 June 2005	
Suurejõe Selver	Suur-Jõe 57	2000	18 August 2005	
Valga Selver	Raja 5	1300	15 September 2005	
Pelgulinna Selver	Sõle 51	1500	29 October 2005	
Mustakivi Selver	Mustakivi 3a	2000	13 October 2005	
Sõbra Selver	Sõbra 41	1500	8 December 2005	
Veeriku Selver	Vitamiini 1	3200	15 December 2005	
Jõhvi Selver	Narva maantee 8	1400	4 May 2006	
Jaamamõisa Selver	Jaama 74	1400	12 April 2007	
Jõgeva Selver	Kesk 3a/4	800	19 July 2007	
Põltsamaa Selver	Jõgeva maantee 1a	1700	18 December 2007	
Kohtla-Järve Selver	Järveküla tee 68	1300	13 March 2008	
Hiiumaa Selver	Rehemäe, Linnumäe küla	1900	29 May 2008	
Marienthali Selver	Paldiski maantee 56	2000	19 June 2008	
Põlva Selver	Jaama 12	1000	3 July 2008	
Ülejõe Selver	Tallinna maantee 93a	1900	24 July 2008	
Paide Selver	Aiavilja 4	1300	28 August 2008	
Keila Selver	Piiri tänav 12	2200	20 November 2008	
Kakumäe Selver	Rannamõisa tee 6	2000	23 March 2009	
Rannarootsi Selver	Rannarootsi tee 1	1500	26 March 2010	
Saku Selver	Üksnurme tee 2	1800	17 May 2012	
Vahi Selver	Vahi 62	1000	13 December 2012	
Rapla Selver	Tallinna maantee 4	1700	20 December 2012	
Läänemere Selver	Läänemere tee 28	1400	7 March 2013	
Aardla Selver	Võru 77	1200	20 June 2013	
Centrumi Selver	Tallinna maantee 22	1000	1 November 2013	
Astri Selver	Tallinna maantee 41	1700	19 June 2014	
Kärberi Selver	K. Kärberi 20/20a	1300	7 April 2016	
Arsenali Selver	Erika 16	1500	27 October 2016	
Maardu Selver	Nurga 3	1000	1 December 2016	
Tähesaju Selver	Tähesaju tee 1/3	1500	20 April 2017	
Balti Jaama Turu Selver	Kopli 1	1200	19 May 2017	
Laagri Selver	Pärnu mnt 554	1800	14 December 2017	
Kolde Selver	Sõle 31	1800	22 November 2018	
Kagukeskuse Selver	Kooli 6, Võru	1600	26 March 2020	
Pärnu Keskuse Selver	Lai 5, Pärnu	1100	19 March 2021	
Priisle Selver	Priisle 1, Tallinn	1000	16 June 2022	
Tabasalu Selver	Kallaste 7	2000	6 October.2022	
Kurna Selver	Kurna küla Kangrumetsa tee 3	4500	24 August 2023	
Rocca al Mare Selver	Paldiski mnt 102, Tallinn	3182	29 August 2024	
Raadi Selver	Nõlvakaare 4, Tartu	3350	26 September 2024	

=== Selver ABC ===
Location	Address	Size (m^{2})	Opened	Additional info
Balti jaama Selver ABC	Toompuiestee 37, Tallinn	600	28 November 2013	
Sepapaja Selver ABC	Sepapaja 2, Tallinn	1000	8 June 2017	
Kotka Selver ABC	Kotka 12, Kotka Tervisemaja C-korpus	500	16 November 2017	
WOW Selver ABC	Merikotka 1, Kuressaare	600	9 July 2020	Closed on 9 January 2023 due to renting contract end.
Valdeku Selver ABC	Vabaduse pst 54b, Tallinn	200	6 October 2020	
Liivalaia Selver ABC	Liivalaia 7, Tallinn	200	13 October 2020	
Laulasmaa Selver ABC	Kloogaranna tee 26, Laulasmaa	500	21 October 2020	
Kadrioru Selver ABC	Narva mnt 90, Tallinn	600	28 October 2020	
Veskitammi Selver ABC	Veskitammi 10, Laagri	700	4 November 2020	
Nõmme Selver ABC	Jaama 2, Tallinn	600	11 November 2020	
Ristiku Selver ABC	Telliskivi 24, Tallinn	300	18 November 2020	
Kreutzwaldi Selver ABC	Kreutzwaldi 21, Tallinn	600	26 November 2020	
Vana-Pärnu Selver ABC	Haapsalu mnt 41, Pärnu	800	2 December 2020	
Oja Pärnu Selver ABC	Liblika 6, Pärnu	500	6 January 2021	
Raatuse Selver ABC	Raatuse 20, Tartu	500	13 January 2021	
Ranna Selver ABC	Karusselli 91, Pärnu	200	20 January 2021	
Ümera Selver ABC	Riia maantee 79, Tartu	300	27 January 2021	
Rukkilille Selver ABC	Tuglase 14, Tartu	300	3 February 2021	
Laine Selver ABC	Mai 4, Pärnu	400	10 February 2021	

=== Delice supermarkets ===
Location	Address	Size (m^{2})	Opened in	Additional info
Viimsi Delice	Randvere tee 6, Viimsi	1800	13 August 2008	
Pärnu Delice	Lai 5, Pärnu	1000	8 May 2014	Changed its name to Pärnu Keskuse Selver in 1Q of 2021.
Solarise Delice	Estonia pst 9, Tallinn	2280	10 October 2009	

=== Former stores ===
Comarket
- Type: Supermarket
- Founded: 2002
- Fate: Rebranded as Selver ABC in 2021
- Number of locations: 16
- Area served: Estonia
- Owner: Tallinna Kaubamaja Grupp

==== Comarket ====
Comarket was a chain that started in 2002, the owner was ABC Supermarkets before being bought by Selver in 2020. The company that owned it used to be a sister company before being merged in May 2020. Selver announced about Comarket being rebranded as Selver ABC which started from October 2020. By the end of November all stores in Tallinn except Marja Comarket were rebranded. Due to Marja Comarket being close to Marienthali Selver the store was closed. Rebranding finished on 10 February 2021 with the last store closing on 17 February and the Comarket brand no longer exists.

Location	Address	Opened	Notes
Valdeku Comarket	Vabaduse pst 54b, Tallinn		Opened as Valdeku Selver ABC on 6 October 2020.
Liivalaia Comarket	Liivalaia 7, Tallinn		Opened as Liivalaia Selver ABC on 13 October 2020.
Laulasmaa Comarket	Kloogaranna tee 26, Laulasmaa		Opened as Laulasmaa Selver ABC on 21 October 2020.
Kadrioru Comarket	Narva mnt 90, Tallinn		Opened as Kadrioru Selver ABC on 28 October 2020.
Laagri Comarket	Veskitamme 10, Laagri		Opened as Veskitammi Selver ABC on 4 November 2020.
Nõmme Comarket	Jaama 2, Tallinn	31 May 2004	Opened as Nõmme Selver ABC on 11 November 2020.
Pelgulinna Comarket	Telliskivi 24, Tallinn		Opened as Ristiku Selver ABC on 18 November 2020.
Kreutzwaldi Comarket	Narva mnt 21, Tallinn		Opened as Kreutzwaldi Selver ABC on 26 November 2020.
Vana-Pärnu Comarket	Haapsalu mnt 41, Pärnu		Opened as Vana-Pärnu Selver ABC on 2 December 2020.
Oja Comarket	Liblika 6, Pärnu		Opened as Oja Pärnu Selver ABC on 6 January 2021.
Raatuse Comarket	Raatuse 20, Tartu		Opened as Raatuse Selver ABC on 13 January 2021.
Ranna Comarket	Karusselli 91, Tartu		Opened as Ranna Selver ABC on 20 January 2021.
Ümera Comarket	Riia 79, Tartu		Opened as Ümera Selver ABC on 27 January 2021.
Rukilill Comarket	Tuglase 2, Tartu		Opened as Rukkilille Selver ABC on 3 February 2021.
Mai Comarket	Mai 4, Pärnu		Opened as Laine Selver ABC on 10 February 2021.
Marja Comarket	Mustamäe tee 45, Tallinn		Closed.
