= Jim Coop =

English football player (1927–1996)

Personal information
- Full name: James Yates Coop
- Date of birth: 17 September 1927
- Place of birth: Horwich, Lancashire, England
- Date of death: 12 November 1996 (aged 69)
- Place of death: Doncaster, South Yorkshire, England
- Height: 5 ft 8 in (1.73 m)
- Position: Winger

Senior career*
Years	Team	Apps	(Gls)
–1946	Brodsworth Main		
1946–1949	Sheffield United	9	(1)
1949–1951	York City	12	(4)
1951–????	Goole Town		
Total		21	(5)
- * Club domestic league appearances and goals

James Yates Coop (17 September 1927 – November 1996) was an English professional footballer who played as a winger in the Football League for Sheffield United and York City, and in non-League football for Brodsworth Main and Goole Town.
