= Pieter Coopse =

Dutch Golden Age seascape painter and draughtsman

Pieter Coopse, or Pieter Jansz Coops (c. 1640 – 1673), was a Dutch Golden Age seascape painter and draughtsman from Hoorn in the Northern Netherlands.

According to the Netherlands Institute for Art History, he was a pupil of the seascape painter Ludolf Bakhuizen who resided at Hoorn in 1662–1663. He signed his name P. Coopse, sometimes with a second initial J for Jansz, but he seldom added a date.
